= 3rd Daytime Emmy Awards =

- Date: May 11, 1976
- Location: Vivian Beaumont Theatre
- Presented by: National Academy of Television Arts and Sciences
- Hosted by: Bob Barker

Highlights
- Outstanding Drama Series: Another World
- Outstanding Game Show: The $20,000 Pyramid

Television/radio coverage
- Network: CBS

The 3rd Daytime Emmy Awards were held Tuesday, May 11, 1976 to commemorate excellence in daytime programming from the previous year (1975). All members of the National Academy of Television Arts and Sciences chose the nominees, with "blue-ribbon" panels selecting the winners. Hosted by Bob Barker and broadcast from the Vivian Beaumont Theatre, the telecast aired from 3-4:30 p.m. EST on CBS and preempted reruns of All in the Family, plus Match Game and Tattletales.

Robert Precht produced, integrating entertainment with the awards ceremony. Entertainers during the show included Rita Moreno and Edward Villella. Twenty-two categories were presented. Dinah Shore presented the award for Best Actor in a Daytime Drama Special, in which there was a tie, but she only read one name during the ceremony.

== Winners and nominees ==
Winners in each category are listed first and in bold.

**Outstanding Daytime Drama Series**	**Outstanding Daytime Drama Special**
**Another World (NBC)**; All My Children (ABC); Days of Our Lives (NBC); The Young and the Restless (CBS)	**First Ladies' Diaries** ("Edith Wilson", NBC); First Ladies' Diaries ("Rachel Jackson", NBC); First Ladies' Diaries ("Martha Washington", NBC)
**Outstanding Actor in a Daytime Drama Series**	**Outstanding Actor in a Daytime Drama Special**
**Larry Haines** (Stu Bergman, Search for Tomorrow); John Beradino (Dr. Steve Hardy, General Hospital); Macdonald Carey (Dr. Tom Horton, Days of our Lives); Bill Hayes (Doug Williams, Days of our Lives); Michael Nouri (Steve Kaslo, Search for Tomorrow); Shepperd Strudwick (Victor Lord, One Life to Live)	**Gerald Gordon** (First Ladies' Diaries: Rachel Jackson, NBC) – **tie**; **James Luisi** (First Ladies' Diaries: Martha Washington, NBC) – **tie**
**Outstanding Actress in a Daytime Drama Series**	**Outstanding Actress in a Daytime Drama Special**
**Helen Gallagher** (Maeve Ryan, Ryan's Hope); Denise Alexander (Dr. Lesley Williams Faulkner, General Hospital); Frances Heflin (Mona Kane, All My Children); Susan Seaforth Hayes (Julie Olson, Days of Our Lives); Mary Stuart (Joanne Vincente, Search for Tomorrow)	**Elizabeth Hubbard** (Edith Wilson, First Ladies' Diaries: Edith Wilson, NBC); Susan Browning (Martha Washington, First Ladies' Diaries: Martha Washington, NBC)
**Outstanding Individual Director of a Daytime Drama Series**	**Outstanding Individual Director of a Daytime Drama Special**
**David Pressman** (One Life to Live, ABC); Richard Dunlap (The Young and the Restless, CBS); Hugh McPhillips (The Doctors, NBC)	**Nicholas Havinga** (First Ladies' Diaries: Edith Wilson, NBC)
**Outstanding Writing for a Daytime Drama Series**	**Outstanding Writing for a Daytime Drama Special**
**Days of Our Lives** — **Sheri Anderson** ˑ **William J. Bell** · **Wanda Coleman** · **Pat Falken Smith** · **Kay Lenard** · **Bill Rega** · **Margaret Stewart** (NBC); All My Children — Agnes Nixon (ABC); The Edge of Night — Henry Slesar (ABC); The Guiding Light — Bridget and Jerome Dobson · Jean Rouverol; The Young and the Restless – Kay Alden · William J. Bell	**First Ladies' Diaries: Edith Wilson – Audrey Davis Lavin** (NBC)
**Outstanding Game or Audience Participation Show**	**Outstanding Daytime Talk Series**
**The $20,000 Pyramid** - A Bob Stewart Production for ABC (Syndicated by Viacom); Hollywood Squares - A Heatter-Quigley Production for NBC (Syndicated by Filmways); Let's Make a Deal - A Stefan Hatos-Monty Hall Production for ABC (Syndicated by WorldVision); Match Game - A Mark Goodson-Bill Todman Production for CBS (Syndicated by Jim Victory); The Price Is Right - A Mark Goodson-Bill Todman Production for CBS (Syndicated by Viacom)	**Dinah!** (Syndicated by 20th Century Fox Television); Good Morning America (ABC); The Mike Douglas Show (Syndicated)
**Outstanding Game or Audience Participation Show Host**	**Outstanding Daytime Talk Series Host**
**Allen Ludden** (Password, ABC); Peter Marshall (Hollywood Squares, NBC); Geoff Edwards (Jackpot, NBC)	**Dinah Shore** (Dinah!, Syndicated by 20th Century Fox Television); Mike Douglas (The Mike Douglas Show, Syndicated); David Hartman (Good Morning America, ABC)
**Outstanding Directing in a Game or Audience Participation Show**	**Outstanding Directing in a Daytime Talk Series**
**Mike Gargiulo** (The $20,000 Pyramid - a Bob Stewart Production for ABC; Syndicated by Viacom)	**Glen Swanson** (Dinah!, Syndicated by 20th Century Fox Television)
**Outstanding Children's Entertainment Series**	**Outstanding Children's Entertainment Special**
**Big Blue Marble** (Syndicated); Captain Kangaroo (CBS); Fat Albert and the Cosby Kids (CBS); Zoom (PBS)	**"Danny Kaye's Look-In at the Metropolitan Opera"** (Episode of The CBS Festival of Lively Arts for Young People, CBS); "It Must Be Love ('Cause I Feel So Dumb!)" (Episode of ABC Afterschool Special, ABC); "Me & Dad's New Wife" (Episode of ABC Afterschool Special, ABC); "Papa and Me" (Episode of Special Treat, NBC); "What is Noise and What is Music?" (Episode of The CBS Festival of Lively Arts for Young People, CBS)
**Outstanding Children's Informational Series**	**Outstanding Children's Informational Special**
**Go** (NBC); The Electric Company (PBS); Make a Wish (ABC)	**Happy Anniversary, Charlie Brown** (CBS); What Are the Loch Ness and Other Monsters All About? (CBS); Winning and Losing: Diary of a Campaign (ABC)
**Outstanding Children's Instructional Series or Special**	**Oustanding Achievement in Children's Programming**
**Grammar Rock** (ABC); Mister Rogers' Neighborhood (PBS); Sesame Street (PBS)	**The Muppets – Jim Henson · Richard Hunt · Jerry Nelson · Frank Oz · Caroll Spinney**
