= Eunice Gardner Wyatt =

- Search for Tomorrow character
- Ann Williams as Eunice Gardner Wyatt in November 1976
- Portrayed by: Marion Brash (1957–1961; 1969 temporary replacement); Ann Williams (1966–1976)
- Duration: 1957–1961, 1966–1976
- First appearance: 1957
- Last appearance: November 19, 1976
- Created by: Charles Gussman
- Introduced by: Roy Winsor (1957, 1966)
In-universe information
- Other names: Eunice Martin; Eunice Wyatt
- Occupation: Housewife; Secretary
- Father: Frank Gardner
- Mother: Helen Gardner
- Sisters: Joanne Gardner
- Husband: Rex Twining; Doug Martin; John Wyatt
- Daughters: Suzi Martin
- Grandsons: Jonah Carter

Eunice Wyatt (also Gardner, Twining and Martin) is a fictional character from the American soap opera Search for Tomorrow. The role was originated by Marion Brash from 1957 to 1961, and then portrayed by Ann Williams from 1966 until the character's death in November 1976.

== Portrayal ==
The role of Eunice was originated by Marion Brash from 1957 to 1961, and then portrayed by Ann Williams from 1966 until the character's death on November 19, 1976. Brash returned in 1969 as a temporary replacement for Williams, when she was on maternity leave.

== Storylines ==
Introduced in 1957, Eunice is the sister of Joanne Gardner (Mary Stuart) and, at first, very selfish and neurotic. She has a brief affair with Jo's second husband, Arthur Tate (Terry O'Sullivan), and is so racked with guilt about it that she confesses everything to her sister. She next falls for Rex Twining (Laurence Hugo), who is involved with Arthur's wealthy aunt, Cornelia Simmons (Doris Dalton). When Cornelia is found dead, Eunice and Rex become suspects and flee for the Caribbean. Cornelia's housekeeper, Harriet Baxter (Vicki Viola), is later revealed to be the killer. Eunice leaves town in 1961.

Eunice returns years later in 1966, having married and then divorced Rex. She is a lot nicer and not so selfish and unstable as before. She meets and marries lawyer Doug Martin (Ken Harvey), with whom she has a daughter named Suzi. Although Eunice is influenced by the women's liberation movement, she does her best to make her marriage work. After Doug dies, Eunice meets John Wyatt (Val Dufour) while working at a magazine that he owns. John and Eunice marry, but he had been seeing the unstable Jennifer Pace Phillips (Morgan Fairchild). Wanting John for herself and losing touch with reality, Jennifer confronts Eunice with a gun on November 19, 1976. She shoots Eunice in the back and kills her, hallucinating that John's voice told her to do it. John is put on trial for murder, but Jennifer is ultimately revealed to be the killer.
