= 4th Daytime Emmy Awards =

- Date: May 12, 1977
- Location: Tavern on The Green
- Presented by: National Academy of Television Arts and Sciences

Highlights
- Outstanding Drama Series: Ryan's Hope
- Outstanding Game Show: Family Feud

Television/radio coverage
- Network: NBC

The 4th Daytime Emmy Awards were held Thursday, May 12, 1977, on NBC to commemorate excellence in daytime programming from the previous year (1976). The live coverage held from Tavern on the Green restaurant in Central Park, New York. The fourth awards only had three categories, and thus three awards were given. Hosts were Peter Marshall, Chuck Woolery, Victoria Wyndham, Jack Gilford, and Soupy Sales with a special guest appearance by Gilda Radner of Saturday Night Live. Telecast from 3-4:30 p.m., the awards preempted Another World and The Gong Show.

Winners in each category are in bold.

== Outstanding Daytime Drama Series ==
- All My Children
- Another World
- Days of Our Lives
- The Edge of Night
- **Ryan's Hope**

== Outstanding Actor in a Daytime Drama Series ==
- Larry Keith (Nick Davis, All My Children)
- James Pritchett (Dr. Matt Powers, The Doctors)
- Farley Granger (Dr. Will Vernon, One Life to Live)
- **Val Dufour** (**John Wyatt**, **Search for Tomorrow**)
- Larry Haines (Stu Bergman, Search for Tomorrow)

== Outstanding Actress in a Daytime Drama Series ==
- Ruth Warrick (Phoebe Tyler, All My Children)
- Beverlee McKinsey (Iris Carrington, Another World)
- Nancy Addison (Jill Coleridge, Ryan's Hope)
- **Helen Gallagher** (**Maeve Ryan**, **Ryan's Hope**)
- Mary Stuart (Joanne Vincente, Search for Tomorrow)

== Outstanding Daytime Drama Series Writing ==
- All My Children
- **Ryan's Hope**
- As the World Turns
- Another World
- Days of our Lives

== Outstanding Daytime Drama Series Directing ==
- Another World
- Days of our Lives
- As the World Turns
- **Ryan's Hope**
- The Edge of Night

== Outstanding Game Show ==
- **Family Feud** - A Mark Goodson-Bill Todman Production for ABC (Syn. by Viacom)
- The $20,000 Pyramid - A Bob Stewart Production for ABC (Syn. by Viacom)
- The Hollywood Squares - A Heatter-Quigley Production for NBC (Syn. by Filmways)
- Match Game - A Mark-Goodson-Bill Todman Production for CBS (Syn. by Jim Victory)
- Tattletales - A Mark Goodson-Bill Todman Production for CBS (Syn. by Firestone)

== Outstanding Game Show Host ==
- **Bert Convy** (Tattletales)
- Dick Clark (The $20,000 Pyramid)
- Gene Rayburn (Match Game)
