= Jennifer Pace =

- Search for Tomorrow character
- Morgan Fairchild as Jennifer Pace in November 1976
- Portrayed by: Robin Eisenman (1973); Morgan Fairchild (1973–1977)
- Duration: 1973–1977
- Created by: Ralph Ellis and Eugenie Hunt
In-universe information
- Other names: Jennifer Phillips
- Father: Walter Pace
- Spouse: Scott Phillips

Jennifer Pace Phillips is a fictional character from the American soap opera Search for Tomorrow. The role was originated by actress Robin Eisenman in 1973, and was subsequently portrayed by Morgan Fairchild from 1973 to 1977.

== Casting ==
The role of Jennifer Pace was originated by actress Robin Eisenman in 1973, and was subsequently played by Morgan Fairchild from 1973 to 1977. Fairchild came to New York City in 1973 but could not secure a talent agent, as "Nobody thought I had the right look for New York in '73. Everybody kept saying, 'Oh, no, you're too elegant', 'You're too porcelain', 'You're too this, you're too that'." She signed with Ford Models. According to Fairchild, "I was told, 'Okay, this is a big break for us, we're trying to break into the soap opera market and you are our one person who can talk.'" The agency sent her to audition for Search for Tomorrow, but she did not get the part. The show soon called the agency back to say, "We had somebody we hired to play the bitch a few weeks ago and she's not working out, we want to hire Morgan for that." That role was Jennifer Pace.

== Storylines ==
Jennifer was the beautiful but extremely neurotic daughter of businessman Walter Pace (Tom Klunis). The character became involved with Bruce Carson (Joel Higgins), the ward of series matriarch Joanne Gardner (Mary Stuart). She later marries Scott Phillips (Peter Simon), but drives her alcoholic husband back to drinking. Jennifer is injured when she tries to step through a mirror, and is left unhinged.

Later, Jennifer has an affair with John Wyatt (Val Dufour), the husband of Jo's sister, Eunice Gardner Wyatt (Ann Williams). Wanting John for herself and losing touch with reality, Jennifer confronts Eunice with a gun on November 19, 1976. She shoots Eunice in the back and kills her, hallucinating that John's voice told her to do it. John is put on trial for murder, but Jennifer is ultimately revealed as the killer. Walter places his mentally unstable daughter into a sanitarium in 1977.

== Reception ==
Fairchild received audience recognition for her portrayal, and in 2017 called herself and All My Children's Susan Lucci "the bitch goddesses of daytime" in the 1970s.
