= Daytime Emmy Award for Outstanding Daytime Talk Series =

Television award

- Awarded for: Daytime Talk Series
- Country: United States
- Presented by: National Academy of Television Arts and Sciences
- First award: 1974
- Currently held by: The Kelly Clarkson Show (2026)
- Website: emmyonline.org
- Related: Award was split into Talk Show—Informative and Talk Show—Entertainment from 2008 to 2022

The Daytime Emmy Award for Daytime Talk Series, originally called Outstanding Talk Show, is an award presented annually by the National Academy of Television Arts and Sciences (NATAS) to honor daytime talk shows. It was first presented as the Outstanding Talk Show award at the 1st Daytime Emmy Awards ceremony held in 1974.

From the 35th Daytime Emmy Awards in 2008 to the 49th Daytime Emmy Awards in 2022, the award was divided into two specific categories: Outstanding Talk Show—Informative, honoring talk shows that were more informative in nature, and Outstanding Talk Show—Entertainment, honoring those that were more entertainment in nature. In 2023, the NATAS merged the two specific categories back into one, under the new official name Outstanding Daytime Talk Series.

In the lists below, the winner of the award for each year is shown first, followed by the other nominees.

== 1970s ==
Year	Program	Network	Ref
1974 (1st)
1974 (1st)	The Merv Griffin Show ‡	Syndicated	
1974 (1st)	Dinah's Place	NBC	
1974 (1st)	The Mike Douglas Show	Syndicated	
1975 (2nd)
1975 (2nd)	Dinah! ‡	Syndicated	
1975 (2nd)	The Mike Douglas Show	Syndicated	
1975 (2nd)	Today	NBC	
1976 (3rd)
1976 (3rd)	Dinah! ‡	Syndicated	
1976 (3rd)	Good Morning America	ABC	
1976 (3rd)	The Mike Douglas Show	Syndicated	
1977 (4th)
1977 (4th)	The Merv Griffin Show ‡	Syndicated	
1977 (4th)	Dinah!	Syndicated	
1977 (4th)	The Gong Show	NBC	
1977 (4th)	The Mike Douglas Show	Syndicated	
1978 (5th)
1978 (5th)	The Phil Donahue Show ‡	Syndicated	
1978 (5th)	Dinah!	Syndicated	
1978 (5th)	The Merv Griffin Show	Syndicated	
1978 (5th)	The Mike Douglas Show	Syndicated	
1979 (6th)
1979 (6th)	The Phil Donahue Show ‡	Syndicated	
1979 (6th)	Dinah!	Syndicated	
1979 (6th)	Good Morning America	ABC	
1979 (6th)	The Mike Douglas Show	Syndicated	

== 1980s ==
Year	Program	Network	Ref
1980 (7th)
1980 (7th)	The Phil Donahue Show ‡	Syndicated	
1980 (7th)	Dinah!	Syndicated	
1980 (7th)	Good Morning America	ABC	
1981 (8th)
1981 (8th)	The Phil Donahue Show ‡	Syndicated	
1981 (8th)	Over Easy	PBS	
1981 (8th)	The Richard Simmons Show	Syndicated	
1982 (9th)
1982 (9th)	The Richard Simmons Show ‡	Syndicated	
1982 (9th)	The Phil Donahue Show	Syndicated	
1982 (9th)	Hour Magazine	Syndicated	
1982 (9th)	Louis Rukeyser's Business Journal	Syndicated	
1983 (10th)
1983 (10th)	This Old House ‡	PBS	
1983 (10th)	The Phil Donahue Show	Syndicated	
1983 (10th)	Hour Magazine	Syndicated	
1983 (10th)	The Richard Simmons Show	Syndicated	
1984 (11th)
1984 (11th)	Woman to Woman ‡	Syndicated	
1984 (11th)	The Phil Donahue Show	Syndicated	
1984 (11th)	Hour Magazine	Syndicated	
1984 (11th)	This Old House	PBS	
1985 (12th)
1985 (12th)	The Phil Donahue Show ‡	Syndicated	
1985 (12th)	Hour Magazine	Syndicated	
1985 (12th)	The Merv Griffin Show	Syndicated	
1985 (12th)	This Old House	PBS	
1985 (12th)	Woman to Woman	Syndicated	
1986 (13th)
1986 (13th)	The Phil Donahue Show ‡	Syndicated	
1986 (13th)	Hour Magazine	Syndicated	
1986 (13th)	New York's Master Chefs	PBS	
1986 (13th)	This Old House	PBS	
1987 (14th)
1987 (14th)	The Oprah Winfrey Show ‡	Syndicated	
1987 (14th)	The Phil Donahue Show	Syndicated	
1987 (14th)	Hour Magazine	Syndicated	
1987 (14th)	This Old House	PBS	
1988 (15th)
1988 (15th)	The Oprah Winfrey Show ‡	Syndicated	
1988 (15th)	The Phil Donahue Show	Syndicated	
1988 (15th)	The Frugal Gourmet	PBS	
1988 (15th)	This Old House	PBS	
1988 (15th)	The Wil Shriner Show	Syndicated	
1989 (16th)
1989 (16th)	The Oprah Winfrey Show ‡	Syndicated	
1989 (16th)	The Phil Donahue Show	Syndicated	
1989 (16th)	The Frugal Gourmet	PBS	
1989 (16th)	Live with Regis and Kathie Lee	Syndicated	
1989 (16th)	This Old House	PBS	

== 1990s ==
Year	Program	Network	Ref
1990 (17th)
1990 (17th)	Sally Jessy Raphael ‡	Syndicated	
1990 (17th)	The Phil Donahue Show	Syndicated	
1990 (17th)	The Frugal Gourmet	PBS	
1990 (17th)	The Oprah Winfrey Show	Syndicated	
1990 (17th)	This Old House	PBS	
1991 (18th)
1991 (18th)	The Oprah Winfrey Show ‡	Syndicated	
1991 (18th)	The Phil Donahue Show	Syndicated	
1991 (18th)	The Home Show	ABC	
1991 (18th)	This Old House	PBS	
1992 (19th)
1992 (19th)	The Oprah Winfrey Show ‡	Syndicated	
1992 (19th)	The Phil Donahue Show	Syndicated	
1992 (19th)	The Joan Rivers Show	Syndicated	
1992 (19th)	Live with Regis and Kathie Lee	Syndicated	
1992 (19th)	This Old House	PBS	
1993 (20th)
1993 (20th)	Good Morning America ‡	ABC	
1993 (20th)	The Phil Donahue Show	Syndicated	
1993 (20th)	Live with Regis and Kathie Lee	Syndicated	
1993 (20th)	The Oprah Winfrey Show	Syndicated	
1993 (20th)	This Old House	PBS	
1994 (21st)
1994 (21st)	The Oprah Winfrey Show ‡	Syndicated	
1994 (21st)	The Phil Donahue Show	Syndicated	
1994 (21st)	Live with Regis and Kathie Lee	Syndicated	
1994 (21st)	Ricki Lake	Syndicated	
1994 (21st)	Vicki!	Syndicated	
1995 (22nd)
1995 (22nd)	The Oprah Winfrey Show ‡	Syndicated	
1995 (22nd)	CNN & Company	CNN	
1995 (22nd)	The Phil Donahue Show	Syndicated	
1995 (22nd)	Leeza	NBC	
1995 (22nd)	Live with Regis and Kathie Lee	Syndicated	
1996 (23rd)
1996 (23rd)	The Oprah Winfrey Show ‡	Syndicated	
1996 (23rd)	CNN & Company	CNN	
1996 (23rd)	The Phil Donahue Show	Syndicated	
1996 (23rd)	Leeza	NBC	
1996 (23rd)	Live with Regis and Kathie Lee	Syndicated	
1997 (24th)
1997 (24th)	The Oprah Winfrey Show ‡	Syndicated	
1997 (24th)	The Phil Donahue Show	Syndicated	
1997 (24th)	Leeza	NBC	
1997 (24th)	Live with Regis and Kathie Lee	Syndicated	
1997 (24th)	The Rosie O'Donnell Show	Syndicated	
1998 (25th)
1998 (25th)	The Rosie O'Donnell Show ‡	Syndicated	
1998 (25th)	Leeza	NBC	
1998 (25th)	Live with Regis and Kathie Lee	Syndicated	
1998 (25th)	The Oprah Winfrey Show	Syndicated	
1998 (25th)	The View	ABC	
1999 (26th)
1999 (26th)	The Rosie O'Donnell Show ‡	Syndicated	
1999 (26th)	Leeza	NBC	
1999 (26th)	Live with Regis and Kathie Lee	Syndicated	
1999 (26th)	The Oprah Winfrey Show	Syndicated	
1999 (26th)	The View	ABC	

== 2000–2007 ==
Year	Program	Network	Ref
2000 (27th)
2000 (27th)	The Rosie O'Donnell Show ‡	Syndicated	
2000 (27th)	Donny & Marie	Syndicated	
2000 (27th)	Live with Regis and Kathie Lee	Syndicated	
2000 (27th)	The Martin Short Show	Syndicated	
2000 (27th)	The View	ABC	
2001 (28th)
2001 (28th)	The Rosie O'Donnell Show ‡	Syndicated	
2001 (28th)	Donny & Marie	Syndicated	
2001 (28th)	Live with Regis	Syndicated	
2001 (28th)	The Montell Williams Show	Syndicated	
2001 (28th)	The View	ABC	
2002 (29th)
2002 (29th)	The Rosie O'Donnell Show ‡	Syndicated	
2002 (29th)	Live with Regis and Kelly	Syndicated	
2002 (29th)	The Montell Williams Show	Syndicated	
2002 (29th)	The View	ABC	
2003 (30th)
2003 (30th)	The View ‡	ABC	
2003 (30th)	The Wayne Brady Show ‡	Syndicated	
2003 (30th)	Dr. Phil	Syndicated	
2003 (30th)	Live with Regis and Kelly	Syndicated	
2003 (30th)	Soap Talk	Soapnet	
2004 (31st)
2004 (31st)	The Ellen DeGeneres Show ‡	Syndicated	
2004 (31st)	Dr. Phil	Syndicated	
2004 (31st)	Live with Regis and Kelly	Syndicated	
2004 (31st)	The View	ABC	
2004 (31st)	The Wayne Brady Show	Syndicated	
2005 (32nd)
2005 (32nd)	The Ellen DeGeneres Show ‡	Syndicated	
2005 (32nd)	Dr. Phil	Syndicated	
2005 (32nd)	Live with Regis and Kelly	Syndicated	
2005 (32nd)	Soap Talk	Soapnet	
2005 (32nd)	The View	ABC	
2006 (33rd)
2006 (33rd)	The Ellen DeGeneres Show ‡	Syndicated	
2006 (33rd)	Dr. Phil	Syndicated	
2006 (33rd)	Live with Regis and Kelly	Syndicated	
2006 (33rd)	The View	ABC	
2007 (34th)
2007 (34th)	The Ellen DeGeneres Show ‡	Syndicated	
2007 (34th)	Dr. Phil	Syndicated	
2007 (34th)	Rachael Ray	Syndicated	
2007 (34th)	The Tyra Banks Show	Syndicated	
2007 (34th)	The View	ABC	

== 2008–2022 ==
The award was split into Talk Show—Informative and Talk Show—Entertainment.

== 2023–present ==
The separate Informative and Entertainment awards were merged back into a single award.

Year	Program	Network	Ref
2023 (50th)
2023 (50th)	The Kelly Clarkson Show	Syndicated	
2023 (50th)	The Drew Barrymore Show	Syndicated	
2023 (50th)	The Jennifer Hudson Show	Syndicated	
2023 (50th)	Live with Kelly and Ryan	Syndicated	
2023 (50th)	Today with Hoda & Jenna	NBC	
2024 (51st)
2024 (51st)	The Kelly Clarkson Show	Syndicated	
2024 (51st)	The Jennifer Hudson Show	Syndicated	
2024 (51st)	Tamron Hall	Syndicated	
2024 (51st)	Turning the Table with Robin Roberts	Disney+	
2024 (51st)	The View	ABC	
2025 (52nd)
2025 (52nd)	Live with Kelly and Mark	Syndicated	
2025 (52nd)	The Drew Barrymore Show	Syndicated	
2025 (52nd)	The Jennifer Hudson Show	Syndicated	
2025 (52nd)	The Kelly Clarkson Show	Syndicated	
2026 (53rd)
2026 (53rd)	The Kelly Clarkson Show	Syndicated	
2026 (53rd)	3rd Hour Today	NBC	
2026 (53rd)	The Drew Barrymore Show	Syndicated	
2026 (53rd)	Live with Kelly and Mark	Syndicated	
2026 (53rd)	Today with Jenna & Friends	NBC	
2026 (53rd)	The View	ABC	

== Multiple wins and nominations ==
Wins	Host
9	The Oprah Winfrey Show
6	Donahue
5	The Rosie O'Donnell Show
4	The Ellen DeGeneres Show
4	The Kelly Clarkson Show
2	Dinah!
2	The Merv Griffin Show

Nominations	Host
20	Donahue
19	Live
13	The Oprah Winfrey Show
12	The View
11	This Old House
6	Dinah!
6	Hour Magazine
6	Donahue
6	The Mike Douglas Show
5	Leeza
5	The Kelly Clarkson Show
5	The Rosie O'Donnell Show
4	The Ellen DeGeneres Show
4	Good Morning America
3
3	The Drew Barrymore Show
3	The Frugal Gourmet
3	The Jennifer Hudson Show
3	The Richard Simmons Show
2
2	4th Hour of Today
2	CNN & Company
2	Donny & Marie
2	The Merv Griffin Show
2	The Montell Williams Show
2	Soap Talk
2	The Wayne Brady Show
2	Woman to Woman
