= Melba Rae =

American actress

- Born: 1921 or 1922; Willard, Utah
- Died: December 29, 1971, aged 49; Manhattan, New York City
- Occupation: Actress
- Spouse: Gilbert Shawn (1955-1971)

Melba Rae Toombs, known professionally as Melba Rae (1921 or 1922 in Willard, Utah – December 29, 1971 in Manhattan) was an American soap opera actress.

== Career ==
Rae acted in early daytime television, playing the wife of the couple next door on Search for Tomorrow for 20 years — from its inception in 1951 until her untimely death of a cerebral hemorrhage at New York Hospital. Her character, Marge Bergman, was best friends with the main character of the series, Joanne (played by Mary Stuart).

== Personal life ==
Rae, a lifelong member of the Church of Jesus Christ of Latter-day Saints was married to Gilbert Shawn from September 2, 1955, until her death. The couple had a son and daughter. Their son, Eric Shawn, became a reporter for Fox News Channel. Gilbert Shawn moved to Orlando, Florida later in life, where he died at the age of 84.

== Death ==
On December 29, 1971, Rae died of a cerebral hemorrhage at New York Hospital in New York City, aged 49.
