= 1st Daytime Emmy Awards =

- Date: May 28, 1974
- Location: Rockefeller Plaza, New York City
- Presented by: National Academy of Television Arts and Sciences
- Hosted by: Barbara Walters; Peter Marshall

Highlights
- Outstanding Drama Series: The Doctors
- Outstanding Game Show: Password

Television/radio coverage
- Network: NBC

The 1st Daytime Emmy Awards were held on Tuesday, May 28, 1974, to commemorate excellence in daytime programming from the previous year (1973). It was hosted by Barbara Walters and Peter Marshall at the Rockefeller Plaza in New York City and televised on NBC. They were introduced to the stage by game and variety show host Garry Moore. Broadcast from 12-1:30 p.m. EDT, the telecast preempted Jackpot, Celebrity Sweepstakes and local programming. For the first and only time, the Daytime Emmy Awards aired on the same day as the Primetime Emmy Awards, broadcast that evening on NBC.

Winners in each category are in bold.

== Outstanding Drama Series ==
- Days of Our Lives
- **The Doctors**
- General Hospital

== Outstanding Actor in a Daytime Drama Series ==
- **Macdonald Carey** (Dr. Tom Horton, Days of our Lives)
- John Beradino (Dr. Steve Hardy, General Hospital)
- Peter Hansen (Lee Baldwin, General Hospital)

== Outstanding Actress in a Daytime Drama Series ==
- Mary Fickett (Ruth Martin, All My Children)
- **Elizabeth Hubbard** (Dr. Althea Davis, The Doctors)
- Rachel Ames (Audrey Hardy, General Hospital)
- Mary Stuart (Joanne Gardner, Search for Tomorrow)

== Best Actress in Daytime Drama - For a Special Program ==
- **Eve Arden** (The ABC Afternoon Playbreak - episode "Mother of the Bride")

== Best Individual Director for a Game Show ==
- **Jerome Shaw** (The Hollywood Squares)

== Best Individual Director for a Daytime Drama ==
- **Wes Kenney** (Days of our Lives)
- Norman Hall (The Doctors)

== Best Writing for a Game Show ==
- **Jay Redack, Harry Friedman, Harold Schneider, Gary Johnson, Steve Levitch, Rick Kellard, Rowby Goren** (The Hollywood Squares)

== Best Writing for a Drama Series ==
- **Henry Slesar** (The Edge of Night)
- Frank Hursley, Doris Hursley, Bridget Dobson, and Deborah Hardy (General Hospital)
- Eileen Pollock, Robert Mason Pollock, and James Lipton (The Doctors)

== Best Host or Hostess in a Talk, Service, or Variety Series ==
- **Dinah Shore** (Dinah's Place, NBC)

== Best Host or Hostess in a Game Show ==
- **Peter Marshall** (Hollywood Squares)
- Monty Hall (Let's Make a Deal)

== Outstanding Game Show ==
- **Password**
- Let's Make a Deal
- Hollywood Squares

== Outstanding Entertainment - Children's Series ==
- **Zoom** - Jim Crum, Christopher Sarson; PBS
- Captain Kangaroo - James Kramer (executive producer), Jim Hirschfeld (producer); CBS
- Fat Albert and the Cosby Kids - Norm Prescott, Lou Scheimer (producers); CBS
- Star Trek: The Animated Series - Lou Scheimer, Norm Prescott (producers); NBC
