= Eric Shawn =

American television news anchor and reporter

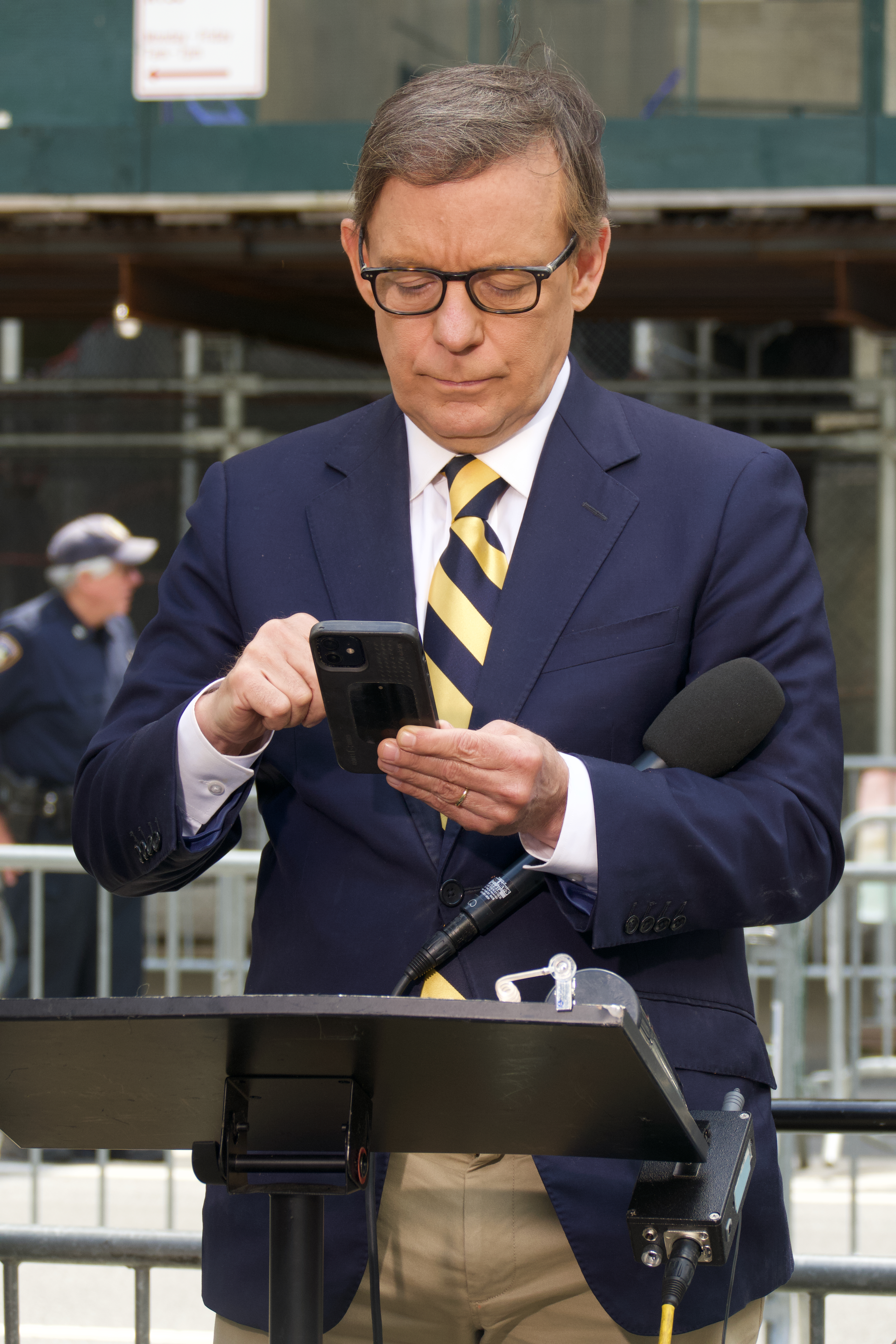
- Shawn in 2024
- Occupations: News anchor; reporter
- Parents: Gilbert Shawn (father); Melba Rae (mother)

Eric Shawn is an American television news anchor and reporter for Fox News, based in Manhattan alongside co-anchor Arthel Neville.

== Early life and education ==
Shawn is the son of Gilbert Shawn and Melba Rae, an actress best known for her long-running role as Marge Bergman on Search for Tomorrow. He graduated from Trinity School in New York City and Georgetown University with a degree in urban studies. Shawn had a cameo role as a reporter in the 1990 film Gremlins 2: The New Batch.

== Career ==
Shawn worked as a reporter for WNYC TV at NYC City Hall during the Mayor Koch Years and WNYW (FOX) and WPIX in New York before joining Fox News' affiliate news service, Fox News Edge as the Fox Network Anchor and Correspondent. Shawn has covered many of the major national and international stories over the past few decades, including: the Gulf War, the 1992 Clinton campaign, the Democratic and Republican national conventions, and the O. J. Simpson murder case among many other breaking stories.

In 2001, Mafia hitman Frank Sheeran told Shawn that he shot labor leader Jimmy Hoffa in a house in Detroit on July 30, 1975, and Shawn led the team that found blood evidence on that house's floor in 2004. Shawn's efforts led to the publication of the book I Heard You Paint Houses and the 2019 film The Irishman. He hosted the documentary film Riddle: The Search for James R. Hoffa on the streaming service Fox Nation.

Shawn currently co-anchors the weekend programs of America's News Headquarters with Arthel Neville, as well as serves as the Senior Correspondent for the network.

On September 11, 2025, Shawn disclosed he has been diagnosed with cancer, having been exposed to the toxic dust stemming from the September 11 terrorist attacks near the World Trade Center.

=== Notable interview subjects ===
- President of Iran Mahmoud Ahmadinejad (September 24, 2010)
- Israeli Prime Minister Shimon Peres (September 28, 2016)
- Israeli Prime Minister Benjamin Netanyahu
- President of Venezuela Hugo Chávez
- British Prime Minister Tony Blair
- Prime Minister of Pakistan Benazir Bhutto
- U.N. Secretary-General Kofi Annan
- U.N. Secretary-General Ban Ki-moon

== Filmography ==
Year	Title	Role	Notes
1990	Gremlins 2: The New Batch	TV Reporter #2	

== Books ==
- The U.N. Exposed: How the United Nations Sabotages America's Security and Fails the World. Sentinel (May 4, 2006) ISBN 1-59523-020-3

== See also ==
- New Yorkers in journalism
