= Emmy Award for Outstanding Talk Series =

Emmy Award for Outstanding Talk Series or Show may refer to the following Emmy Awards:

- Primetime Emmy Award for Outstanding Talk Series
- Daytime Emmy Award for Outstanding Talk Series
