= Woman to Woman (talk show) =

American television talk show

- Genre: Talk show
- Directed by: Mary Hardwick
- Presented by: Pat Mitchell
- Opening theme: "Woman to Woman" by Dionne Warwick
- Country of origin: United States
- Original language: English
- No. of seasons: 1
- No. of episodes: 169

Production
- Executive producer: Mary Muldoon
- Running time: 42–43 minutes
- Production company: Golden West Television

Original release
- Network: Syndication
- Release: September 12, 1983 – 1984

Woman to Woman is an American daytime talk show that was hosted by Pat Mitchell. The show ran in syndication for one season from September 12, 1983, to 1984, in which it broadcast 169 episodes. The show featured discussions with various women on topics that were meant to be relevant to the daytime female viewer.

== Reception ==
=== Critical response ===
John J. O'Connor of The New York Times claimed that the show was "certainly a step in the right direction for daytime commercial television".

=== Awards and nominations ===
Awards and nominations
Award	Year (Note: Indicates the year of ceremony)	Category	Nominee(s)	Result	Ref.
Daytime Emmy Awards	1984	Outstanding Daytime Talk Series	Woman to Woman	Won	
Daytime Emmy Awards	1985	Outstanding Daytime Talk Series	Woman to Woman	Nominated	
