= Jack Calmes =

American inventor, executive, and musician (1943–2015)

- Born: October 21, 1943; Oklahoma City, Oklahoma
- Origin: United States
- Died: January 5, 2015 (aged 71) Dallas, Texas
- Occupations: Inventor, executive and musician
- Instruments: Ukulele, guitar
- Spouses: Morgan Fairchild (m. 1967; div. 1973); Lynn Lenau (m. 1975; div. 1989); Susie Coniglio (m. 1989)

Jack Calmes (October 21, 1943 – January 5, 2015) was an American inventor, sound reinforcement and lighting business executive, and musician.

In 1965, he co-founded Showco, a concert sound and lighting service company. In 1984, Calmes founded Syncrolite, an entertainment/architectural light manufacturer.

Calmes received two United States patents, managed Rock and Roll Hall of Famer Freddie King and multi-platinum rock band Bloodrock, and founded the Forever Fabulous Chickenhawks Showband & All-Revue.

== Early life ==
Calmes was born in Oklahoma City to parents Mary and Charles Calmes. Calmes picked up a love of music from his mother, Mary, who was a piano player and singer. The family relocated to Clinton, Oklahoma, not long after he was born.

Calmes' lifelong fascination with music first showed itself when playing Eddy Arnold songs on the ukulele, before learning guitar at the age of 15. The Calmes family had moved to Dallas' Highland Park neighborhood when he was nine, and he was soon performing professionally at the Dallas Sportatorium.

Calmes attended Highland Park High School, where as a sophomore, he formed his first band, the Jades, in direct competition with classmates Steve Miller and Boz Scaggs. In 1961, Calmes, Miller and Scaggs joined forces to merge their two bands, and, according to Calmes, "played all the proms and got more money."

Miller and Scaggs attended out-of-state colleges after high school graduation, and Calmes remained in Dallas, continuing to perform locally as he attended Southern Methodist University, beginning in 1962. He laid the foundation for his future achievements in technology and business, studying engineering for two years before shifting his focus to the business school, graduating with a bachelor's degree in accounting.

== Showco and Soul City ==
In 1966, after Calmes graduated from Southern Methodist University, he teamed up with fellow Dallas resident Angus Wynne, later joined by Jack Maxson and Rusty Brutsche, to create the music-related company Showco.

Among Showco's early coups: a Texas-University of Oklahoma party at Dallas' Market Hall featuring Chuck Berry as the headliner; promoting other concerts by such stars as Bob Dylan, Janis Joplin and the Doors, and a double bill of Ike and Tina Turner and the Righteous Brothers at a Dallas country club that Calmes cited as "the biggest one."

In 1967, Calmes and Wynne expanded their business portfolio by opening a nightclub, Soul City, on Greenville Avenue in Dallas. During the short time they owned the 300-capacity space, it featured shows by Stevie Wonder, Fats Domino, Chuck Berry, Little Richard, Ike and Tina Turner and Jerry Lee Lewis. Calmes would often join the headliners, performing on stage during their sets. Calmes and Wynne sold their interest in Soul City in 1968.

During their tenure at Soul City, the partners used their Showco sound system, impressing the hundreds of bands who performed at the club. The Showco team also joined Atlanta-based Alex Cooley in organizing the Texas International Pop Festival in 1969. Although the festival was a success, featuring, among others, Led Zeppelin, Janis Joplin, Chicago, B.B. King, Canned Heat, Spirit and Santana, Calmes and Wynne couldn't sustain the financial burden of producing it, reportedly over $100,000 ($878,000 today), and parted ways. Calmes would regroup and rededicate his efforts to building up Showco.

Showco's initial focus was sound systems, addressing musicians' frustrations with sub-par live sound set-ups. As a gigging musician himself, Calmes understood the need for clear, efficient sound systems, and worked to provide them for a range of clients‘ live shows and tours, starting with Three Dog Night, Led Zeppelin and Steppenwolf as the company's first three accounts, later ranging from Elvis Presley to Genesis. At its peak, Showco had ten sets of lighting and sound packages traveling with major acts. Other bands utilizing Showco's touring packages included the Carpenters, Bread, Rare Earth and the Kinks.

As a technology company, Showco built its own soundboards, developing automated lights that could change colors, and entire systems controllable from one master switchboard. They were the first to use lasers in a concert, to use trusses, they invented aluminum towers and pneumatic towers, allowing shows to be set up quickly. The business grew to include product marketing as well.

Calmes resigned as president of Showco in 1980. What began as Showco was later spun off into Vari*Lite, so named in 1984.

== Syncrolite ==
After resigning from Showco, Calmes founded the Dallas-based Syncrolite, in 1984. The company's achievements include developing the first, fully automated DMX (digital multiplex)-controlled Xenon light system in 1989.

That system, however, resulted in a 1989 lawsuit from Vari*Lite, claiming Calmes infringed upon Vari*Lite's patents for moving concert lights that could change color. Calmes countersued Vari*Lite, claiming his former business partners had misled him about the development of the Vari-Lite system when he left Showco in 1980. He felt that he had inadvertently mimicked, though also exceeded, the Vari*Lite system. After five years, the case was resolved in favor of Vari*Lite.

Syncrolite continued operations, and has provided systems for an array of events, including events such as the 2012 Olympics in London; the 75th anniversary of the Golden Gate Bridge; Super Bowl XLV and the 2014 NCAA Final Four at AT&T Stadium; the three-day March Madness Music Festival at Reunion Park in downtown Dallas; the Houston Rodeo; the 30th anniversary of Wrestlemania at the New Orleans Superdome and a Red Bull "Crashed Ice" event in Quebec City.

== Other endeavors ==
Through a division of Showco, Calmes began managing musical artists in 1970. Among the acts he was responsible for included Rock and Roll Hall of Fame member Freddie King (whom Calmes got signed to Leon Russell's Shelter Records); Bloodrock and John Nitzinger, as well as Jim Rutledge, amassing what he says are "seven or eight gold records."

Calmes also produced a variety of film and live television projects, including a global satellite broadcast of the Who in 1982 (later released as the documentary The Who Rocks America) for 20th Century Fox and HBO, as well as the 1988 presidential debates for CSN. Calmes also co-produced the 1978 Rolling Stones concert film Some Girls: Live in Texas '78.

In 1980, Calmes founded the 16-piece soul-blues-R&B group Forever Fabulous Chickenhawks Showband & All-Star Revue, in which he played lead guitar. The Chickenhawks released five albums, including three live albums (1999's Live, 2002's Live from the Gypsy Tea Room and 2007's Louisiana Live) and two studio albums (1999's Chickenhawks and 2004's Deep in the Heart).

== Patents ==
Calmes earned two United States patents (U.S. patent 8,596,824 and U.S. patent 8,721,123) for a "method and apparatus for a scrollable modifier for a light fixture" and a "pattern generator for a light fixture," respectively.

The patents were both filed by Calmes as a representative of Syncrolite and granted in 2009. The patents he held as part of Showco were sold when he left the company, as part of the corporation's intellectual property, although Calmes did keep a percentage of the patent.

The abstract for the "pattern generator for a light fixture" reads:

An apparatus includes a first flexible material that has a first area with a first texture that produces a first predetermined amount of diffusion of a beam of light, where the first texture produces at least some diffusion in the beam of light. The apparatus also includes a second flexible material attached to a first portion of the first area, where the second flexible material reduces the amount of diffusion of the beam of light produced by the first texture of the first portion of the first area. A light fixture includes a light fixture and the first flexible material coupled to a scrolling mechanism. The scrolling mechanism is operable to position a selected area of the first flexible material such that a beam of light from the light source passes through a first area of the first flexible material.

The abstract for the "method and apparatus for a scrollable modifier for a light fixture" reads:

A light fixture includes a light source, a first flexible material coupled to a first scrolling mechanism, and a second flexible material coupled to a second scrolling mechanism. The first flexible material includes a first pattern generator and the first scrolling mechanism is operable to move the first pattern generator from a first position to a second position in a beam of light from the light source. The second flexible material includes a second pattern generator and the second scrolling mechanism is operable to move the second pattern generator to a third position in the beam of light. A changing pattern is produced in the beam of light.

== Personal life ==
In 1967, Calmes married Dallas native Morgan Fairchild, to whom he would remain married for six years, before divorcing in 1973. Calmes married Lynn Lenau in 1975, before divorcing in 1989. He wed his third wife, Susie Calmes (née Coniglio), in 1989, and the couple lived in Dallas, where they were partners in Syncrolite.

Jack Calmes died from cancer at home at the age of 71.
