= Glamour Manor =

American daytime radio program

- Genre: Situation comedy, audience interviews
- Running time: Daytime
- Country of origin: United States
- Language: English
- Home station: Blue Network
- Starring: Cliff Arquette, Tyler McVey, Lurene Tuttle, Kenny Baker
- Written by: Various
- Directed by: Ken Burton
- Produced by: Betty Buckler, Keith McLeod
- Original release: July 3, 1944 – June 27, 1947
- Sponsored by: Procter & Gamble

Glamour Manor is an American daytime radio program that was broadcast on the Blue Network from July 3, 1944 until June 27, 1947.

Cliff Arquette starred in Glamour Manor, which varied in format depending on the day of the week. Mondays, Wednesdays, and Fridays featured situation-comedy episodes, while on Tuesdays and Thursdays Arquette and co-star Lurene Tuttle interviewed members of the audience. The sponsor was Procter & Gamble, primarily promoting Crisco and Ivory Snow. The program initially originated from studios at Sunset Boulevard and Vine Street in Hollywood. Daily prizes were given to members of the studio audience whose tickets were drawn from a fish bowl.

The situation comedy had Arquette managing Glamour Manor Hotel, which he had inherited, with its "33 delightful but dilapidated rooms and the odd assortment of guests who live in them". He also played Captain Billy and Mrs. Wilson, an elderly lady. Tyler McVey played desk clerk Tyler, and Tuttle played his girlfriend, Gloria Kenyon. Others in the cast were John McIntire as Hamlet Mantel, Bea Benaderet as Wanda Werewolf, and Will Wright as Maloney. Francis X. Bushman was also in the cast. Hal Stevens and Ernie Newton were the singers, with Charles "Bud" Dant and Charlie Hale's orchestra providing music. Announcers were Jack Bailey, Bob Bruce, and Terry O'Sullivan. "There's a Small Hotel" was the theme song. Betty Buckler was the original producer; Keith McLeod replaced her in November 1944.

In January 1945, Glamour Manor moved to New York. Arquette and McVey kept their parts. Tuttle was replaced by Jan Miner as Gloria, but after a short time Virginia Vass replaced Miner. Arthur Vinton portrayed Hamlet Hantell, and Rolfe Sedan was heard in several roles. Jack Smith was the singer, and Harry Lubin led the orchestra.

In September 1945, after an eight-week summer hiatus, the show returned to Hollywood. Arquette, McVey, Vass, and Lubin stayed on the show, and Newton returned as singer. Chief Quigley was added as cook at the hotel, "just a front to extoll the virtues of Crisco". Rod Connor became the announcer.

Kenny Baker joined the cast in June 1946 as "singing proprietor" and "slightly addled emcee" of the hotel when Arquette left for other work. Barbara Eiler was added as Barbara Dilley, bookkeeper for the hotel and girlfriend of Baker. Don Wilson portrayed a boarder who often gave bad advice, and Sam Hearn played Schlepperman, who often made situations worse. Elvira Allman played socialite Mrs. Biddle. Wilson doubled as announcer, and Lubin continued to direct the orchestra. Ken Burton was the director.
