= Joseph Hardy (director) =

American film director (1929–2024)

- Born: March 8, 1929; Carlsbad, New Mexico, U.S.
- Died: June 6, 2024 (aged 95); Englewood, New Jersey, U.S.
- Education: New Mexico Highlands University (BA); Yale University (MFA)
- Occupations: Theater and Film director
- Years active: 1972–2012

Joseph Hardy (March 8, 1929 – June 6, 2024) was an American Tony Award-winning stage director, film director, television producer, and occasional performer.

== Early life and education ==
Hardy was born March 8, 1929, in Carlsbad, New Mexico. He earned his bachelor's from New Mexico Highlands University and his MFA from the Yale School of Drama.

== Career ==
As a television producer, he produced two daytime soap operas in the 1960s: Ben Jerrod on NBC and A Time for Us on ABC. He was executive producer of Love Is a Many Splendored Thing, Ryan's Hope and General Hospital. In addition, he was the executive producer of James at 15/16, a primetime drama that aired on NBC.

In 1967, he won the Drama Desk Award for Outstanding Director for You're a Good Man, Charlie Brown, and won the Tony Award for Best Direction of a Play in 1969 for Child's Play. His 1974 film Great Expectations was entered into the 9th Moscow International Film Festival in 1975.

== Personal life and death ==
After leaving General Hospital, Hardy spent much of the 1990s living and working in France. He would return to New York City later in the decade.

Hardy died on June 6, 2024, at the age of 95 as a resident since 2020 at the Actors Fund Home in Englewood, New Jersey. He is survived by sister Caroline Rackley of New Mexico.
