= Ben Jerrod =

American TV soap opera

- Genre: Soap opera
- Created by: Roy Winsor
- Written by: William Kendall Clark
- Directed by: Fred Carney
- Country of origin: United States
- Original language: English
- No. of seasons: 1
- No. of episodes: 65

Production
- Producer: Joseph Hardy
- Camera setup: Single-camera
- Running time: 25 mins.

Original release
- Network: NBC
- Release: April 1 – June 28, 1963

Ben Jerrod is an American serial which ran from April 1, 1963 to June 28, 1963. The series is most notable for being the first daytime drama to be regularly televised in color. Michael M. Ryan played the show's title character. The cast also included Addison Richards, Lyle Talbot, Gerald Gordon, and Isabel Randolph.

== Production ==
The show was one of the least-durable soap operas on television. It was created by Roy Winsor and was produced by Joseph Hardy. William Kendall Clark was the writer, and Fred Carney was the director. Ben Jerrod's musical bridges were produced through a guitar and percussion instruments.

Recorded on tape in Hollywood, Ben Jerrod was broadcast from 2 to 2:25 p.m. Eastern Time. It joined with another soap opera, House of Hope, to replace Merv Griffin's program, but its ratings turned out to be lower than Griffin's show. Its competition included Password on CBS and Day in Court on ABC. It was replaced by People Will Talk.

== Synopsis ==
Set in the town of Indian Hill, the series follows two Rhode Island lawyers defending a socialite accused of murdering her husband. John Abbott is a retired judge, and his young assistant, Jerrod, attended Harvard. Abbott's daughter was their "secretary and gal Friday".

== Cast ==
- Michael M. Ryan as Ben Jerrod
- Addison Richards as John Abbott, Jerrod's older partner
- Jeanne Baird as Agnes Abbott, daughter of John Abbott
- Lyle Talbot as Lt. Choates
- Regina Gleason as Janet Donnelli
- Ken Scott as Jim O'Hara, Donnelli's boyfriend
- Peter Hansen as druggist Peter Morrison
- Martine Bartlett as Lil Morrison, wife of Peter Morrison
- Gerald Gordon as Sam Richardson
- Denise Alexander as Emily Sanders
- William Phipps as Coroner Engle
- John Napier as D.A. Dan Joplin
- Don Collier as Abel Forsythe
- Adele Pike as Jo Helton
- Charlotte Stewart as Ingénue
- Isabel Randolph
- Paul Geary
