= Marion Brash =

American actress (1931–2022)

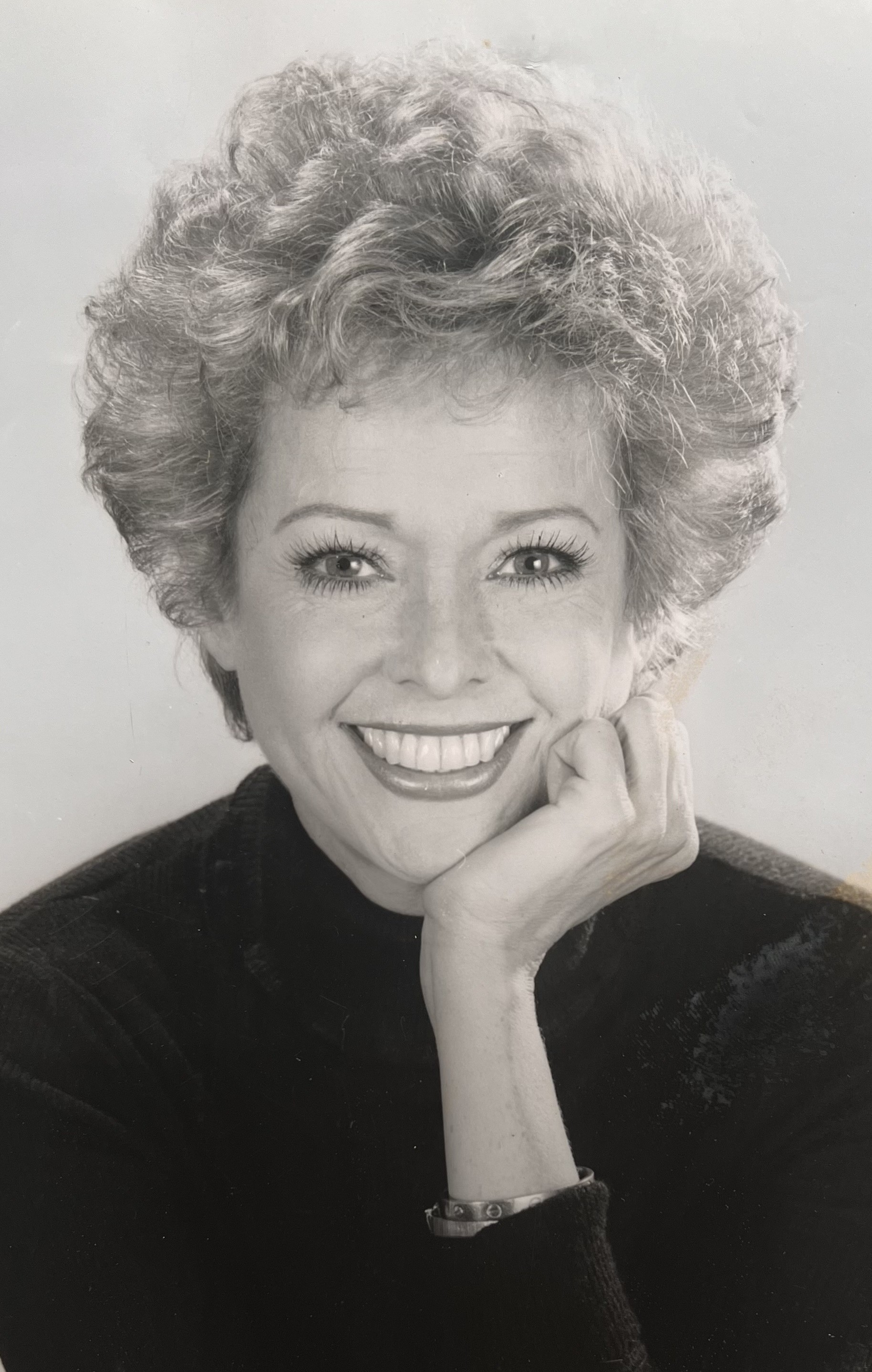
- Marion Brash in 1976
- Born: Marion Brasch; March 27, 1931; Berlin, Brandenburg, Prussia, Germany
- Died: January 10, 2022 (aged 90); New York City, U.S.
- Occupation: Actress

Marion Brash (March 27, 1931 – January 10, 2022) was an American actress known for her work in television and cinema.

== Early years ==
Brash was born in Berlin (as Marion Brasch), and came to the United States as a child. Her acting debut came in a touring production of Born Yesterday shortly after she graduated from high school. She went on to study acting under Lee Strasberg and Sanford Meisner.

== Career ==
Brash was a regular on television's The Bob and Ray Show (1951–1953). She made her first appearance on television in 1948 on Studio One. In 1953, she appeared in an episode of Man Against Crime, an early television series starring Ralph Bellamy. She portrayed a glamorous prostitute in the 20th episode of Gunsmoke in 1956. On soap operas, Brash played Eunice Gardner Wyatt on Search for Tomorrow from 1957 to 1961 and multiple characters on The Edge of Night. Subsequently, she appeared in many television series, including Hogan's Heroes and Ironside.

She also had roles in films, including The Group and Slaughter with Jim Brown, Stella Stevens, and Rip Torn.

On Broadway, Brash debuted in Tall Story (1959) and appeared in Hidden Stranger (1963). She also acted for two years in an off-Broadway production of The Threepenny Opera. She was also active in summer stock theater productions. In her later years, she was a popular New York City tour guide entertaining tourists until the age of 88.

== Personal life and death ==
Brash married Saul Novick, president of a clothing importing company. She lived in New York City. Brash died in New York City on January 10, 2022, at the age of 90.
