= Larry Haines =

American actor

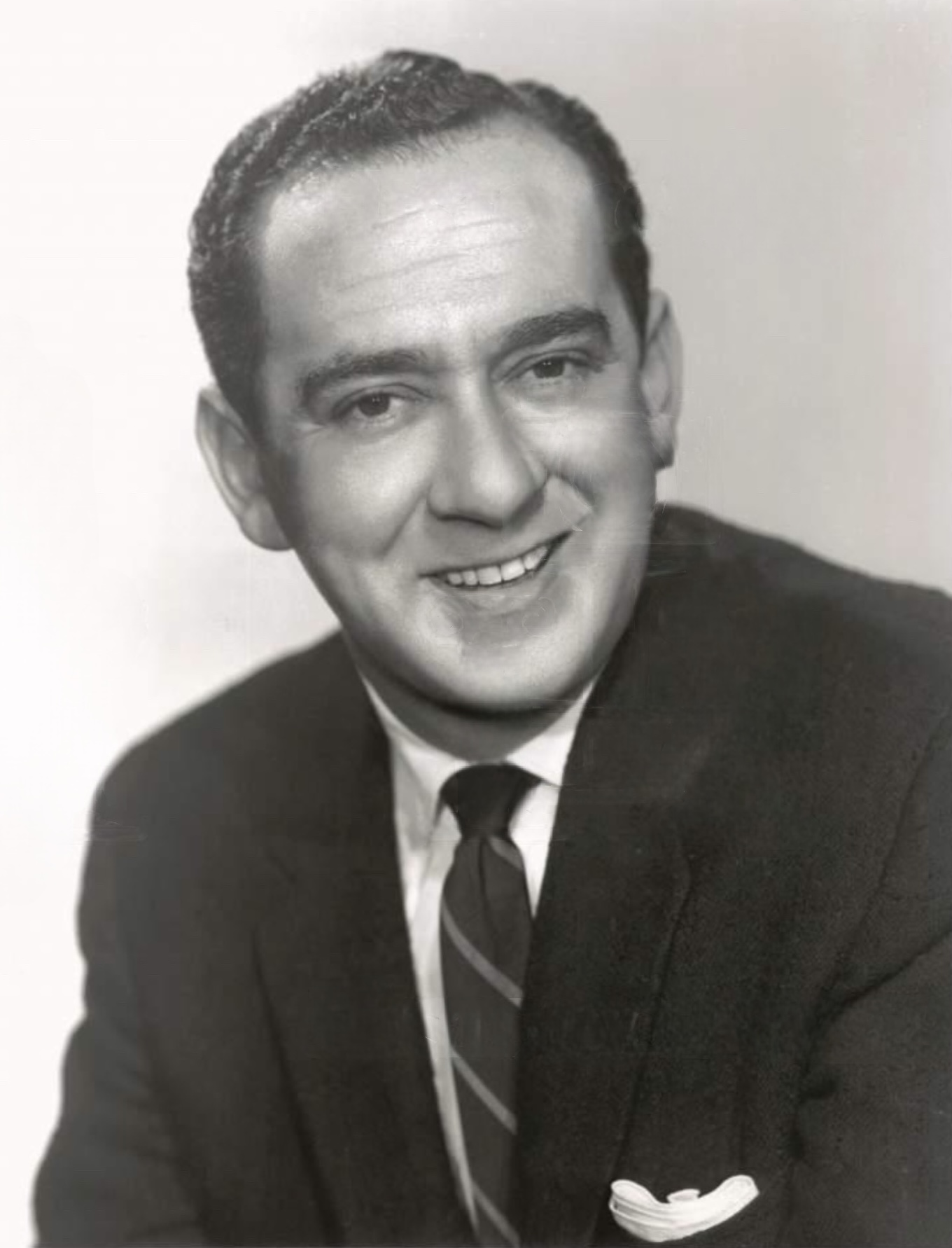
- Haines in 1956
- Born: Larry Hecht; August 3, 1918; Mount Vernon, New York, U.S.
- Died: July 17, 2008 (aged 89); Delray Beach, Florida, U.S.
- Occupation: Actor
- Spouse(s): Gertrude Haines (1943 - 1982 died); Jean Pearlman Haines
- Children: 1

Larry Haines (born Larry Hecht; August 3, 1918 – July 17, 2008) was an American actor.

== Early years ==
Haines was born on August 3, 1918, in Mount Vernon, New York. (Some sources say August 18, 1918, in the same city). He had been active in dramatics in high school, and while he was in college, he was advised to try acting. After a few months of instruction in dramatics, he passed an audition with CBS. He dropped out during his sophomore year of college and "went right into radio working on little stations all around New York City," beginning at WWRL.

== Radio ==
Haines first became known in the 1930s as an actor on the radio crime series Gangbusters. Playing Joe Lincoln, he was the star of Treasury Agent on the Mutual Broadcasting System in 1947–48, and he had the title role of Mike Hammer in That Hammer Guy on Mutual in 1953–54. He also was featured in The Chase, Cloak and Dagger, Inner Sanctum Mystery, The Man Behind the Gun, and This Is Nora Drake. It was estimated that he acted in more than 15,000 radio programs in the 1940s and 1950s. Four decades later, he would return to radio, starring in 82 episodes of the CBS Radio Mystery Theater.

== Television ==
His best known role was that of next door neighbor Stu Bergman on the soap opera Search for Tomorrow. Haines joined the show for its eleventh episode in 1951, and remained on the serial for the show's duration. He won Daytime Emmy Awards in 1976 and 1981, and was First Lady Pat Nixon's favorite soap opera actor. Haines was reunited with longtime Search for Tomorrow costar Mary Stuart on the prime-time special which saluted 50 years of the soaps in 1994.

In the 1980s, he co-starred with one of his Search for Tomorrow co-stars, Rick Lohman (who had played his grandson, Gary Walton) in a short-lived sitcom, called Phyl & Mikhy. Larry played Max Wilson, the father of Phyllis Wilson Orloff (Murphy Cross), who was married to Mikhy Orloff.

In 1989, several years after the cancellation of Search for Tomorrow, he briefly joined the cast of another NBC/Procter and Gamble serial, Another World. Haines played the role of Sid Sugarman, Ada Hobson's old boyfriend who escorted her to a gala honoring the show's 25th anniversary. He was later in the cast of Agnes Nixon's Loving, playing Neal Warren, the biological father of Gwyneth Alden with whom he was reunited right before she was identified as the serial killer in the slaying of the Alden family and several other characters. In the last episodes of the show, his character proposed to old girlfriend Kate Rescott.

== Stage ==
Haines' Broadway debut came in 1962, when he played in A Thousand Clowns. He earned Tony nominations for his work in Generation (1965) and Promises, Promises (1968). His other Broadway appearances were in Last of the Red Hot Lovers, Twigs, No Hard Feelings, and Tribute.

== Death ==
Haines died in Delray Beach, Florida, on July 17, 2008. He was predeceased by his former wives, Gertrude Haines and Jean Pearlman Haines as well as by his only daughter, Debora Haines. He was survived by one niece.

== Film ==
Haines appeared in the role of Speed in the film version of The Odd Couple (1968). He also appeared in the films The Seven-Ups (1973) and Tank (1984).

=== Film roles ===
Year	Title	Role	Notes
1968	The Odd Couple	Speed	
1973	The Seven-Ups	Max Kalish	
1984	Tank	Biker #1	
