= Morgan Fairchild =

American actress (born 1950)

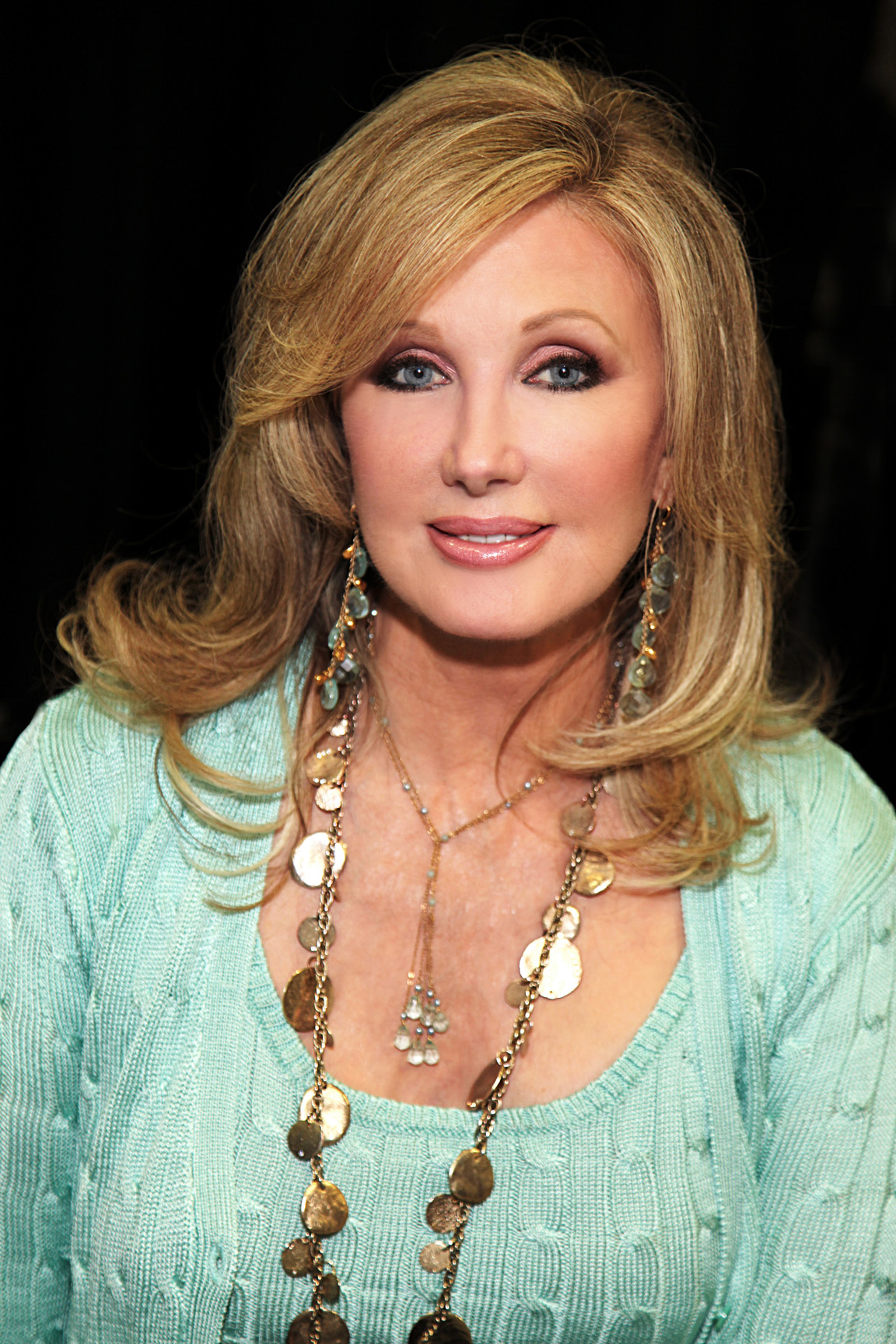
- Fairchild in 2012
- Born: Patsy Ann McClenny; February 3, 1950 (age 76); Dallas, Texas, U.S.
- Occupation: Actress
- Years active: 1967–present
- Spouse: Jack Calmes (m. 1967; div. 1973)
- Website: morganfairchild.com

Patsy Ann McClenny (born February 3, 1950), known professionally as Morgan Fairchild, is an American actress. She began acting in the early 1970s and has had roles in several television series since then.

Fairchild began her career on the CBS daytime soap opera Search for Tomorrow as Jennifer Pace from 1973 to 1977. In 1978, she appeared on the primetime soap opera Dallas as the first actress to portray Jenna Wade, before taking a lead role on the NBC series Flamingo Road in 1980 (for which she was nominated for a Golden Globe Award for Best Actress – Television Series Drama). In 1984, she co-starred on ABC's short-lived television drama Paper Dolls, and then appeared on Falcon Crest as attorney Jordan Roberts from 1985 to 1986. Fairchild has also performed in theater and played guest roles on television comedies, including Murphy Brown (for which she was nominated for a Primetime Emmy Award for Outstanding Guest Actress in a Comedy Series), Two and a Half Men, Roseanne, Cybill, and Friends. She is a board member of SAG-AFTRA.

== Early life ==
Morgan Fairchild was born Patsy Ann McClenny on February 3, 1950, in Dallas, Texas, the daughter of Martha Jane (Hartt), a high school English teacher who taught at Richardson High School (in Richardson, Texas), and Edward Milton McClenny. Fairchild has a younger sister, Cathryn Hartt, who is also an actress. As a young child, she was seen on WFAA's Mr. Peppermint Show with host Jerry Haynes. In her teens, she was in the audience on WFAA's Sump'n Else bandstand show. She auditioned three times to be in The Little Group, which was the show's dance group. Also during this time, she appeared in several locally broadcast commercials on Dallas-Fort Worth television stations.

== Career ==
Fairchild's first acting job was as a double for Faye Dunaway during filming for the film Bonnie and Clyde (1967), particularly in scenes where Bonnie is driving a car because Dunaway could not drive a stick shift. She took her new first name, Morgan, from the David Warner film Morgan - A Suitable Case for Treatment (1966). Fairchild then moved to New York City, where she secured her first credited onscreen role as the maniacal Jennifer Pace in the daytime soap opera Search for Tomorrow from 1973 until 1977. From the mid-1970s, she began to make various appearances on episodic primetime television series such as Kojak, Happy Days, Police Woman, The Bob Newhart Show, and a few episodes of CBS Radio Mystery Theater.

Fairchild played Jenna Wade in the soap opera Dallas for one episode in 1978. The same year, Fairchild made the television film The Initiation of Sarah and also had a recurring role on the sitcom Mork & Mindy. In 1980, she scored her first regular primetime role as Constance Weldon Carlyle on the soap opera Flamingo Road. Though the series had an impressive beginning, the ratings soon dropped and it was canceled after two seasons. Fairchild was nominated for a Golden Globe Award for her role. After the cancellation of Flamingo Road, Fairchild continued to make guest appearances in a variety of episodic television series such as Hotel; Simon & Simon; Magnum, P.I.; and The Love Boat. She also starred in the theatrical film The Seduction (1982). In 1984, along with Joan Collins, she co-hosted the ABC-TV special Blondes vs. Brunettes, a one-hour variety show that gently poked fun at popular culture's blonde vs. brunette rivalry. In that same year, she also co-starred in another primetime soap opera Paper Dolls playing modeling agency owner Racine. The series was cancelled halfway through its first season, but by this time, Fairchild was established as a television actress. In 1985, she joined the cast of the soap opera Falcon Crest, playing the glamorous lawyer Jordan Roberts for a season. She also appeared in the miniseries North and South (1985), and its sequel (1986).

In 1985, Jon Lovitz on Saturday Night Live created the "Tommy Flanagan, The Pathological Liar" character who claimed outlandish achievements for himself, culminating in the grand illusion that his wife was Morgan Fairchild. The obvious remoteness of such a possibility, and its mainstream comic appeal, was testimonial to Fairchild's broad popularity and desirability.

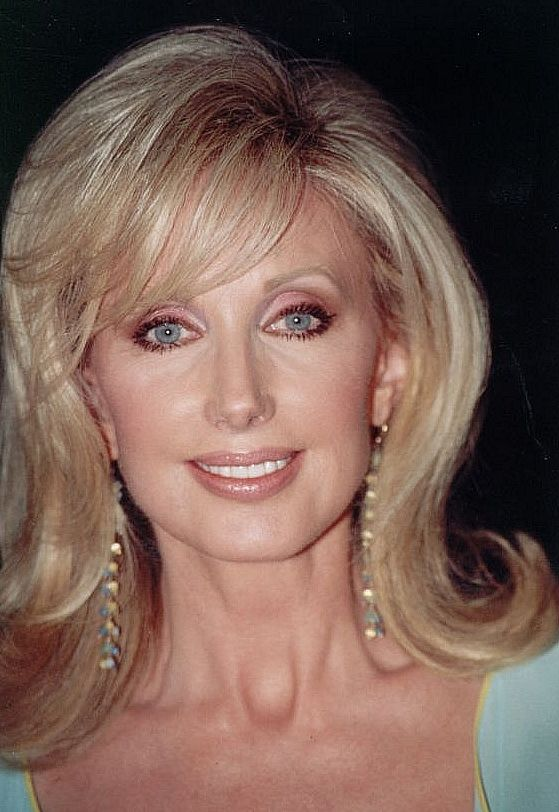
Fairchild in 1999

Fairchild continued to make appearances in films and television series throughout the 1980s and garnered an Emmy Award nomination for her guest appearance in a 1989 episode of Murphy Brown. In the early 1990s, she was cast in a recurring role in Roseanne, as Sandra Bernhard's bisexual girlfriend Marla. In 1994, Fairchild appeared in an unexpectedly campy advertisement campaign for clothing retailer Old Navy, with Joan Collins and other formerly familiar faces on television. Her reprised role as the over-the-top glamour vixen was so successful that the company created numerous sequels around her persona. She played herself in the comedy films Naked Gun 33 1/3: The Final Insult (1994), Holy Man (1998) and Walk Hard: The Dewey Cox Story (2007).

In 1995, Fairchild returned to daytime soap operas as the catty Sydney Chase on The City. She played the role for a year, after which she went on to appear in General Hospital. She also made guest appearances on the hit sitcom Friends (as Chandler Bing's mother, Nora) and was a recurring guest star on the sitcom Cybill as Andrea, a rival of Cybill Shepherd's character.

Through the years, Fairchild has also appeared in various theater productions. More recently, she starred in the role of Mrs. Robinson in the stage adaptation of the film The Graduate. She also fronted an international advertising campaign for the consumer tooth whitening product Dental White. In 2005, Fairchild appeared in the competition reality show But Can They Sing? on VH1.

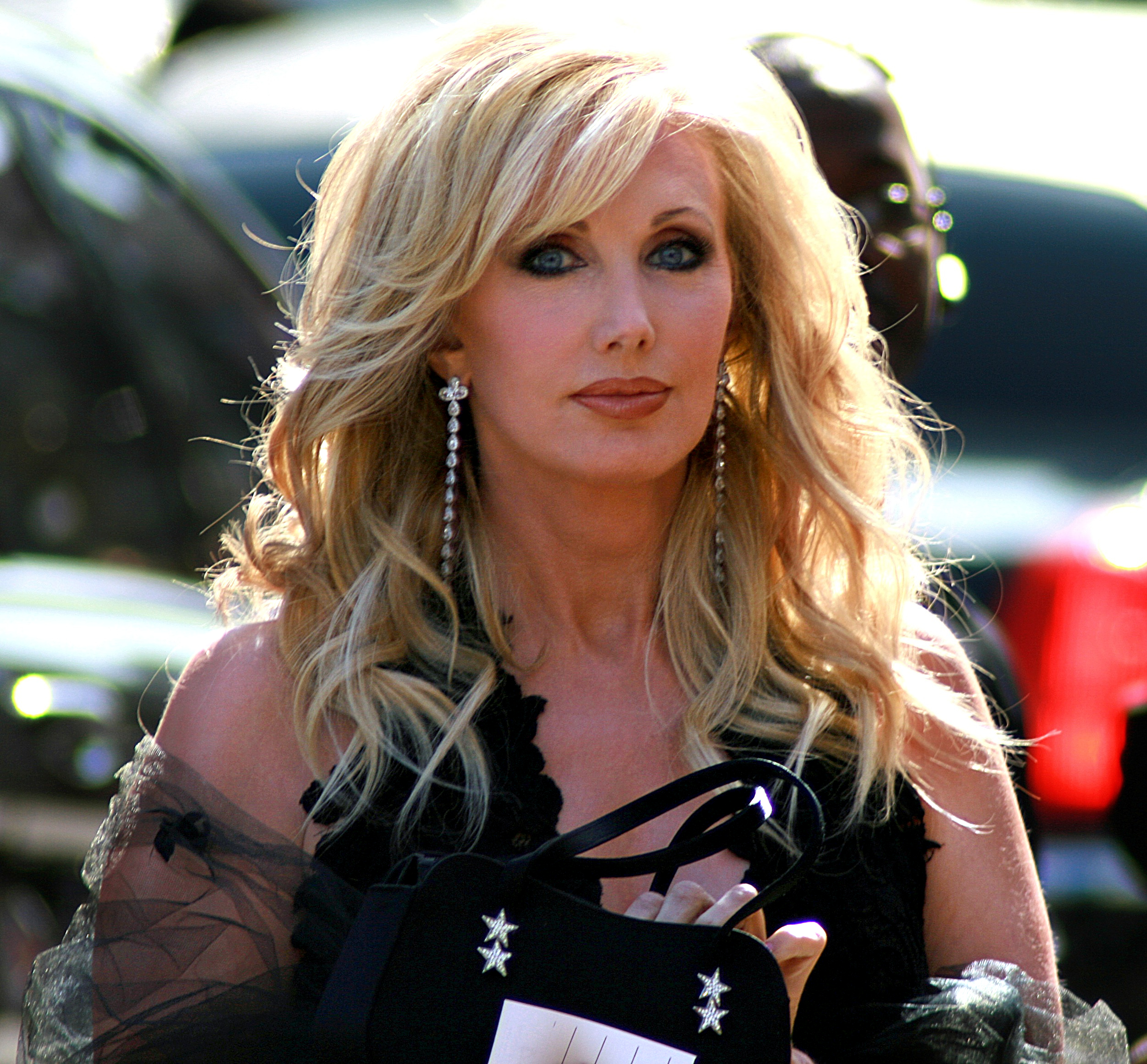
Fairchild in 2007

In 2006, she was cast in yet another of her "rich bitch" roles in the MyNetworkTV series Fashion House, playing Sophia Blakely, a rival to Bo Derek's character, Maria Gianni. She has also appeared on the television series Chuck as Dr. Honey Woodcomb, the mother of Captain Awesome. In 2007 she appeared on Two and a Half Men where she was cast as a cougar who propositions Charlie Harper with the line "What has multiple orgasms and hums?" She made another return to soap operas in 2009 when she had a guest role in the daytime series The Bold and the Beautiful. In recent years, she guest-starred in Bones, Revenge and Hot in Cleveland.

In 2014, Fairchild was named spokesperson for a website that was created to help consumers make burial preplanning choices. It was previously known as BurialPlanning.com but is now known as MemorialPlanning.com. In that capacity, she appeared in television commercials and in a direct mail campaign.

Fairchild has appeared in some independent movies in the 2000s and 2010s. In 2017, she returned to daytime for a limited run in Days of Our Lives playing Anjelica Deveraux, a role previously played by soap actress Judith Chapman. Fairchild received a Daytime Emmy Award for Outstanding Guest Performer in a Drama Series nomination for her performance. In 2022, she guest-starred in the two episodes of ABC soap opera General Hospital playing Haven de Havilland.

On October 3, 2023, it was announced that Fairchild would feature in the Lifetime film, Ladies of the '80s: A Divas Christmas. According to the official synopsis, the movie follows five soap opera divas readying for a reunion show who take on playing cupid during Christmas to bring together their director and producer as they all learn the meaning of the true Christmas spirit. The ensemble cast is made up of Fairchild, Loni Anderson, Linda Gray, Donna Mills, and Nicollette Sheridan.

== Personal life ==
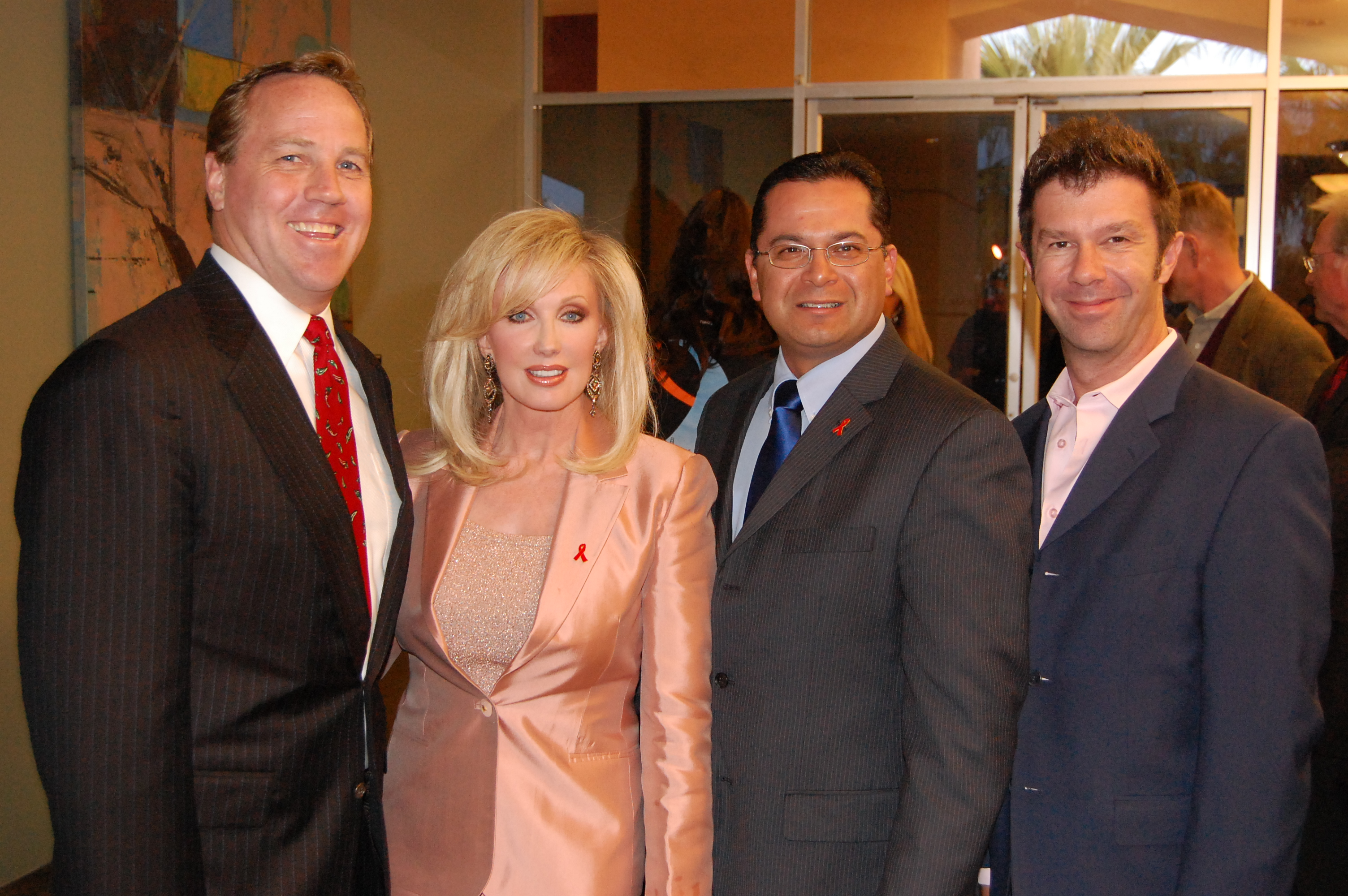
Fairchild at the Desert AIDS Project in 2009

Fairchild was married to Jack Calmes from 1967 to 1973.

For many years, she has been an activist for social causes including AIDS and environmentalism.

She has revealed that she has a mild form of a chronic illness known as ME/CFS. In 2015, she made a speech about her challenges with the illness at a briefing for the National Academy of Medicine formerly known as the Institute of Medicine (IOM).

In 1987, she was involved in a long-term relationship with Mark Seiler. Fairchild reported on her Twitter account that Seiler died on July 7, 2023.

She stated that she was twice kidnapped in the early 1970s.

In addition to her work as an actress, Fairchild has long maintained a strong role within the Screen Actors Guild, now SAG-AFTRA. Fairchild was a three-year board member of the Guild and has served on several committees, including co-chair Legislative Committee, National Executive Committee, SAG-AFTRA Relations Committee, Commercials Contracts Committee, Honors and Tributes Committee (HATS), and Guild Governance and Rules Committee.

== Filmography ==
=== Film ===
Year	Title	Role	Notes
1967	Bonnie and Clyde	Faye Dunaway's Double	Uncredited
1970	A Bullet for Pretty Boy	Small role	Uncredited
1978	The Initiation of Sarah	Jennifer Lawrence	Television film
1979	Murder in Music City	Dana Morgan	Television film
1980	The Memory of Eva Ryker	Lisa Eddington	Television film
1980	Challenge of the Tiger	Celebrity	
1981	The Girl, the Gold Watch & Dynamite	Stella Walker	Television film
1982	The Seduction	Jamie Douglas	
1982	Honeyboy	Judy Wellman	Television film
1984	Time Bomb	Renee DeSalles	Television film
1984	The Zany Adventures of Robin Hood	Lady Marian	Television film
1984	Terror in the Aisles	Jaime Douglas	Archival footage
1985	Pee-wee's Big Adventure	Agent Dottie	
1985	Rodney Dangerfield's Guide to Auto Repair	Angry Customer	
1986	Red Headed Stranger	Raysha Shay	
1987	Campus Man	Katherine Van Buren	
1987	Sleeping Beauty	Queen	
1987	Deadly Illusion	Jane Mallory / Sharon Burton	
1988	Street of Dreams	Laura Cassidy / Eva Bomberg	Television film
1988	Midnight Cop	Lisa	
1989	Phantom of the Mall: Eric's Revenge	Mayor Karen Wilton	
1989	The Haunting of Sarah Hardy	Lucy	Television film
1990	How to Murder a Millionaire	Loretta	Television film
1990	Mob Boss	Gina	
1990	Menu for Murder	Paula Preston	Television film
1991	Even Angels Fall	Leslie	
1991	Writer's Block	Magenta Hart	Television film
1991	Sherlock Holmes and the Leading Lady	Irene Frances Adler	Television film
1992	Just Deserts	Catherine Harcourt	Television film
1993	Perry Mason: The Case of the Skin-Deep Scandal	Alana Westbrook	Television film
1993	Das Paradies am Ende der Berge	Irmgard Hoelzl	
1993	Freaked	Herself	
1993	Based on an Untrue Story	Satin Chow	
1994	Point of Seduction: Body Chemistry III	Beth Chaney	
1994	Test Tube Teens from the Year 2000	Camella Swales	
1994	Naked Gun 33 1/3: The Final Insult	Herself	
1995	Criminal Hearts	District Attorney	
1995	Venus Rising	Peyton	
1995	Gospa	Sister Fabijana Zovko	
1996	Dead Man's Island	Valerie St. Vincent	
1996	Star Command	Commander Sigrid Ivorstetter	Television film (UPN)
1997	Moment of Truth: Into the Arms of Danger	Diana Astin	Television film
1998	Shattered Illusions	Angie	
1998	Holy Man	Herself	
1999	Nice Guys Sleep Alone	Lorraine	
2000	Unshackled	Mrs. Rebecca Miller	
2000	Held for Ransom	Mrs. Kirkland	
2001	Peril	Terry	
2002	Teddy Bears' Picnic	Courtney Vandermint	
2002	I Was a Teenage Faust	Babylonia	Television film
2004	Knuckle Sandwich	Mrs. Simms	
2004	Arizona Summer	Debbie	
2006	Shock to the System	Phyllis Hale	
2006	The Initiation of Sarah	Trina Goodwin	Television film
2007	Walk Hard: The Dewey Cox Story	Herself	
2008	The Sno Cone Stand Inc	Cathy Wanton	
2009	The Slammin' Salmon	Herself	
2010	Life's a Beach	Felicia Wald	
2010	The Steamroom	Sheila	
2011	Boy Toy	Barbara	
2011	Beverly Hills Chihuahua 2	Dog Show Judge	
2011	eCupid	Venus	
2012	American Horror House	Miss Margot / Rosemary	Television film
2012	Spring Break '83	Mouth's Mother	Unreleased
2012	A Perfect Ending	Valentina	
2013	Fighting Back	Cheryl	
2013	Wiener Dog Nationals	Ms. Merryweather	
2013	Dark Power	Elizabeth Archer	
2014	Perfect On Paper	Beverly Wilcox	Television film
2014	Bikini Model Academy	Herself	
2014	Beethoven's Treasure Tail	Charlene	Video
2014	Sam	Lulu	
2014	Christian Mingle	Lacie Wood	
2016	Mostly Ghostly: One Night in Doom House	Lulu	Direct-to-video
2016	A Christmas in Vermont	Joanne Davis	
2017	Scales: Mermaids Are Real	Principal	
2017	You're Gonna Miss Me	Audrey Lake	
2018	All Good Things	Gramma	
2018	My Perfect Romance	Ms. Robinson	Television film
2019	A Date Before Christmas Eve	Mrs. Kringle	Television film
2021	Our (Almost Completely True) Love Story	Morgan	
2023	The Nana Project	Francesca	
2023	Ladies of the '80s: A Divas Christmas	Margaux Roberts	Television film

=== Television ===
Year	Title	Role	Notes
1973–77	Search for Tomorrow	Jennifer Pace	
1976	Kojak	Allison	Episode: "A Hair-Trigger Away"
1977	Rafferty	Lisa Farrell	Episode: "A Point of View"
1977	Switch	Shelley Bloom	Episode: "Downshift"
1977	Rosetti and Ryan	Claire Blake	Episode: "The Ten-Second Client"
1977	Happy Days	Cynthia Holmes	Episode: "My Fair Fonzie"
1977	The Bob Newhart Show	Bianca / Linda	Episode: "Grand Delusion"
1978	Police Woman	Cheryl	Episode: "Murder with Pretty People"
1978	The Amazing Spider-Man	Lisa Benson	Episode: "Night of the Clones"
1978	Barnaby Jones	Felice Winters and Scotty MacKay respectively	Episodes: "Daughter of Evil" and "A Dangerous Affair"
1978	Dallas	Jenna Wade	Episode: "Old Acquaintance"
1978	Escapade	Suzy	TV pilot
1978–79	Mork & Mindy	Susan Taylor	3 episodes
1979	Concrete Cowboys	Carla / Kate	Episode: "Concrete Cowboys"
1979	A Man Called Sloane	Melissa Nelson	Episode: "The Venus Microbe"
1980	The Dream Merchants	Dulcie Warren	TV Miniseries, 2 episodes
1980	Young Maverick	Selene	Episode: "Makin' Tracks"
1981	Women Who Rate a "10"	Herself	Guest host with Erik Estrada and Howard Hessemen
1981	The Love Boat	Jenny Boyer	2 episodes
1980–82	Flamingo Road	Constance Weldon Carlyle	38 episodes Nominated—Golden Globe Award for Best Actress – Television Series Drama (1982)
1982	Magnum, P.I.	Alex Houston / Catherine Hailey	Episode: "Ki'is Don't Lie"
1982	Simon & Simon	Alex Houston / Catherine Hailey	Episode: "Emeralds Are Not a Girl's Best Friend"
1982	The Shape of Things	Herself (1 episode)	Guest host with Sarah Purcell, Lynn Redgrave and Betty White; Show was cancelled after 3 episodes
1983	Hotel	Carol	Episode: "Hotel"
1984	Paper Dolls	Racine	13 episodes
1984	Blondes vs. Brunettes	Herself	ABC TV Special
1985	North and South	Burdetta Halloran	TV miniseries
1986	North and South, Book II	Burdetta Halloran	TV miniseries
1985–86	Falcon Crest	Jordan Roberts	29 episodes Nominated—Soap Opera Digest Award for Outstanding Actress in a Leading Role on a Prime Time Serial (1986)
1989	My Two Dads	Diana Thackery	Episode: "Macho, Stupid Guy Time"
1989	Murphy Brown	Julia St. Martin	Episode: "TV or not TV"; Nominated—Primetime Emmy Award for Outstanding Guest Actress in a Comedy Series (1990)
1992	Roseanne	Marla	3 episodes
1993	Lois & Clark: The New Adventures of Superman	Miranda	Episode: "Pheromone, My Lovely"
1993	Murder, She Wrote	Iris Novaro	Episode: "Murder at a Discount"
1994	Burke's Law	June Ward	Episode: "Who Killed Romeo?"
1994	Empty Nest	Zoe	Episode: "Best Friends"
1994	Diagnosis: Murder	Pamela Dorn	Episode: "My Four Husbands"
1995–96	The City	Sydney Chase	
1996	General Hospital	Sydney Chase	
1995–97	Cybill	Andrea Thorpe	4 episodes
1997	Head over Heels	Mona DuBois	Episode: "Gigolo Guy"
1997	Touched by an Angel	Jackie Sykes	Episode: "My Dinner with Andrew"
1997	The Naked Truth	Herself	Episode: "Bridesface Revisited"
1998	Home Improvement	Herself	Episode: "Mr. Likeable"
1998	V.I.P.	Herself	Episode: "Three Days to a Kill"
1998	The Angry Beavers	Muffy Snootwell	Episode: "Open Wide for Zombies/Dumbwaiters" (voice)
1999	The New Addams Family	Lady Pretensia	Episode: "Thing's Romance"
1995–2001	Friends	Nora Tyler Bing	5 episodes
2001	Dharma & Greg	Jackie	Episode: "Dharma Does Dallas"
2001	7th Heaven	Merle 'Bird'	Episode: Teased
2002	Roswell	Meris Wheeler	2 episodes
2002	Providence	Gwendolynne Gold	Episode: "Limbo"
2002	Maybe It's Me	Kimberly 'Big Kimberly'	Episode: "The Quahog Festival Episode"
2002	That '80s Show	Cossima Blair	Episode: "Beach Party"
2003	Just Shoot Me!	Lily Barton	Episode: "Pictures of Lily"
2004	That '70s Show	Carolyn	Episode: "Going Mobile"
2004	He's a Lady	Herself	Panel judge
2006	Fashion House	Sophia Blakely	35 episodes
2007	Two and a Half Men	Donna	Episode: "Young People Have Phlegm Too"
2008	Men in Trees	Herself	Episode: "Get a Life"
2009	Nip/Tuck	Herself	Episode: "Manny Skerritt"
2009	My Name Is Earl	Carol	Episode: "Friends with Benefits"
2009, 2026	The Bold and the Beautiful	Dorothy "Dottie" Bright	12 episodes
2009	Celebrity Ghost Stories	Herself	1 episode
2010	Law & Order: Special Victims Unit	Claire Lockton	Episode: "Bedtime"
2008–10	Chuck	Dr. Honey Woodcomb	3 episodes
2011	Bones	Bianca Chiverton	Episode: "The Prince in the Plastic"
2011	Chemistry	Michael's Mother	Episode: "In or Out, Part 2"
2012	Happily Divorced	Jill	Episode: "The Reunion"
2014	Revenge	Teresa (cameo)	Episode: "Addiction"
2014	Hot in Cleveland	Claudia / Fake Elka	Episode: "Playmates"
2017	Days of Our Lives	Anjelica Deveraux	17 episodes Nominated — Daytime Emmy Award for Outstanding Special Guest Performer in a Drama Series
2019	Worst Cooks in America	Herself	
2019	Too Old to Die Young	Mrs. Watson	Episode: "Volume 6: The High Priestess"
2020	The Simpsons	Vivienne St. Charmaine	Episode: "Podcast News" (voice)
2022–24	General Hospital	Haven de Havilland	Guest role over three stints

=== Theater ===
Year	Title	Role	Notes
1970	Take Me Along	Belle	Casa Manana Dallas Tx
1970	Mame	Gloria	Casa Manana Dallas Tx
1972	Last of the Red Hot Lovers	Bobbi	National Tour With Barney Martin
1972	Dracula	Blonde Victim	Windmill Theatre Dallas TX
1973	The Tender Trap	Julie	With Tab Hunter
1973	The Seven Year Itch	The Girl	With Arte Johnson
1973	The Marriage-Go-Round	Katrin	With Rosemary Prinz
1973	The Girl in the Paisley Convertible	Sylvia	With Bob Denver
1981	Geniuses	Syke	Douglas Fairbanks Theater NYC
1983	Goodbye Charlie	Charlie	With James Farentino Kenly Players Ohio
1986	Gentlemen Prefer Blondes	Lorilei	Summer Under The Stars
1999	Crimes of the Heart	Chick Boyle	Falcon Theater LA, Gary Marshall
2000	High Infidelity	The Wife	Promenade Theater NYC, John Davidson
2002	Singin' in the Rain	Lina Lamont	Pittsburgh CLO
2004-2005	The Graduate	Mrs. Robinson	National Tour
2014	Murder Among Friends	Angela	New Theatre, Overland Park Kansas
2016-2017	Cinderella Christmas	The Stepmother	Pasadena CA
2017	The Dixie Swim Club	Dinah	New Theatre, Overland Park Kansas
2017	The Dixie Swim Club	Dinah	Florida Production
2022	Don't Dress for Dinner	Suzette	New Theatre, Overland Park Kansas
2023	Always a Bridemaid	Monette	New Theatre, Overland Park Kansas
2024	Butterflies Are Free	Mrs. Baker	Judson Theatre Group South Carolina
2025	Marilyn, Mom, and Me	Eileen Heckart	Annenberg Theater Palm Springs Staged Reading

=== Video games ===
Year	Title	Role	Notes
1995	Multimedia Celebrity Poker	Herself	
