= Patrick Tovatt =

American actor (born 1940)

Patrick Tovatt (born December 11, 1940, in Garrett Ridge, Colorado) is an American actor. He is perhaps best known for his roles on several soap operas, including Zane Lindquist on Another World (1985–1986); Matt McCleary on Search for Tomorrow (1986); and Cal Stricklyn on As the World Turns (1988–1998, 2001). He was nominated for an Emmy Award for Outstanding Supporting Actor in 1994 for his work on As the World Turns.

Tovatt attended Burris Laboratory School in Muncie, Indiana. He attended Harvard University and later transferred to Antioch College where he studied playwriting. He also studied directing at the London Film School.

He was a member of the original company of the American Conservatory Theater in San Francisco. He appeared for 14 seasons at the Actors Theatre of Louisville. He was also a founding director of the Virginia Stage Company in Norfolk, Virginia.

Tovatt has retired to Grants Pass, Oregon.

== Television ==
- 1969 The Virginian (TV series) saison 8 episode 1 (Long ride home) : Charlie
- 1970 The Virginian (TV series) saison 8 episode 18 (Train of darkness) : Corey Halder
- 1988 Designing Women Season 2 Episode 20 (How Great Thou Art) : Reverend Nunn
