= Dinah! =

American television series

- Genre: Variety; Talk show
- Presented by: Dinah Shore
- Starring: Dinah Shore
- Country of origin: United States
- Original language: English
- No. of seasons: 6
- No. of episodes: 568

Production
- Running time: 90 minutes
- Production company: 20th Century Fox Television

Original release
- Network: Broadcast syndication
- Release: October 21, 1974 – October 10, 1980

Dinah! is a daytime variety talk show that was hosted by singer and actress Dinah Shore. The series was distributed by 20th Century Fox Television and premiered on October 21, 1974, in syndication. In 1979, the show became known as Dinah and Friends and remained so until it ended its run in 1980. The show's announcer was Johnny Gilbert.

Like other syndicated talk/entertainment shows of the day, such as The Merv Griffin Show and The Mike Douglas Show, Dinah! was focused on celebrity interviews promoting recent motion pictures, books and other television programs. It was a popular forum for musical acts receiving national exposure performing short song sets followed by a sit-down interview with Shore. A highly successful vocalist and recording artist herself, Shore would usually sing at least one song on each program, either greeting the television viewing audience or saying goodbye to them at the end; she sometimes dueted with musical guests. Each episode was ninety minutes in length.

Dinah! would often do entire 90-minute episodes devoted to one television series; for example, there was an episode saluting The Waltons which featured the entire cast, including the child cast members, and the series creator Earl Hamner Jr. During the show, Shore did a musical salute to the year 1935, which would have been in the time period in which The Waltons took place. Another series that was saluted was M*A*S*H. Again, the entire cast appeared, Gary Burghoff ("Radar O'Reilly") played the drums, and the musical salute was to 1951.

== Production ==
=== Origins ===
The show was the successor to Shore's previous variety effort, Dinah's Place, which aired from 1970 until 1974 on NBC and was cancelled to make way for a network edition of the then-syndicated game show Name That Tune.
