= Joanne Gardner =

- Search for Tomorrow character
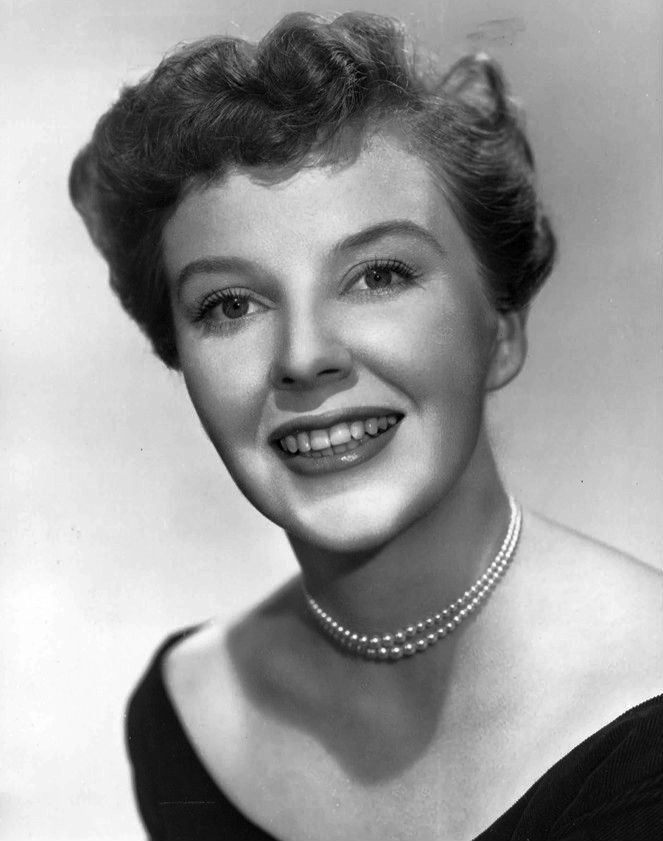
- Joanne in 1955
- Portrayed by: Mary Stuart
- Duration: 1951–86
- First appearance: September 3, 1951
- Last appearance: December 26, 1986
- Created by: Agnes Nixon
- Introduced by: Roy Winsor
In-universe information
- Occupation: Housewife; Proprietor of the Motor Haven Inn; Hospital librarian Hospital personnel director City councilwoman Amateur singer
- Father: Frank Gardner
- Mother: Helen Gardner
- Sisters: Eunice Gardner Wyatt
- Husband: Keith Barron (1945–52); Arthur Tate (1955–66); Tony Vincente (1972–75); Martin Tourneur (1980–84)
- Sons: Duncan Eric Tate
- Daughters: Patti Tate
- Stepsons: Cord Tourneur
- Granddaughters: Sarah Whitting
- Nieces: Suzi Martin

Joanne "Jo" Gardner is a fictional character from the long-running soap opera Search for Tomorrow. The role was played by actress Mary Stuart for the show's entire run. Joanne was married four times, making her full legal name Joanne Gardner Barron Tate Vincente Tourneur.

== Style ==
A "salt of the earth" kind of heroine, Stuart's character was the understanding best friend who would love to (and often did) commiserate with other characters about their sorrows over coffee. She frequently counseled best friends Stu and Marge Bergman. Her role shifted in the 1970s to counseling younger women on the program, when the actress who played Marge died, and Stu was given his own story.

Even when truly dismayed by actions (such as sister Eunice sleeping with her husband, or her daughter willfully marrying into a family who wanted to alienate her from her mother), she usually forgave offenders who showed true remorse. She got a reputation for being "simple-minded" by forgiving and forgetting, as other characters (Irene Barron in the early days, Aunt Cornelia Simmons, Patti's in-law Andrea Whiting, and Stephanie Wilkins later) saw her to be weak and attempted to prey upon her. In true soap opera fashion, however, it was Joanne's rivals who ate crow.

== Background ==
Joanne was raised in the city of Henderson somewhere in the U.S. Midwest. Her parents were Frank Gardner, an accountant, and Helen Gardner, a housewife. Helen died of heart disease in the mid-1950s. Joanne has at least one sibling, a sister named Eunice, who came to town and slept with Joanne's second husband Arthur Tate. However, Eunice reformed, apologized to Joanne, and became part of the family again.

Joanne attended Wilson Grammar School, Henderson High School and attended Henderson College (later Henderson University) for two years before marrying Keith Barron.

== Storylines ==
Joanne was whisked away from her college studies by wealthy Keith Barron, who married her and bought her a house in the town of Henderson. Shortly after, she gave birth to a daughter named Patricia (nicknamed Patti).

Keith's meddling mother, Irene, tried very hard to turn him away from Joanne, as Irene believed that Joanne wasn't nearly good enough for her son. Keith's sister was wise to Irene's controlling ways and tried to warn him, but to no avail. He died of injuries from a car accident in 1952, leaving Joanne a widow. Irene, sensing opportunity, fought for custody of young Patti, arguing that Joanne was unable to provide for her daughter. Joanne proved her wrong by buying and running the Motor Haven Inn. In an attempt to tarnish Joanne's reputation, Irene hired people to sabotage the inn. At the same time, Mafia thugs tried to take over control of the inn, as they didn't believe a woman was strong enough to run a business on her own. Both attempts failed, and Irene left town.

A local businessman, Arthur Tate (Terry O'Sullivan), was interested in financing the inn when Joanne experienced difficulties. Arthur and Joanne fell in love and were married. Patti, now in her early teens, was legally adopted by Arthur shortly after he married Joanne. To get enough money, Arthur persuaded his Aunt Cornelia to give him part of his inheritance. She agreed, if only to meddle in their affairs, because, like Irene, Cornelia hated Joanne and the stock she came from. Eventually, Aunt Cornelia died and Arthur earned all of his inheritance.

Arthur was not a strong man, but he loved Joanne. First, he became an alcoholic. Then, in 1962, a woman came to town suing him for paternity (it was really not his child). In 1963, Arthur and Joanne's son, Duncan Eric Tate, ran in front of a car and was killed, causing mental anguish for both of them. Finally, Joanne's sister Eunice came to town and slept with Arthur. The stress surrounding the possibility that he could shatter his marriage and his relationship with his daughter caused him to die of a heart attack in February 1966.

To keep herself busy after Arthur's death, Joanne took a job as the librarian at Henderson Hospital. A suitor came calling later in the year in the form of Sam Reynolds (Robert Mandan), who was Arthur's rival. To prove his worth to Joanne, he saved her daughter Patti when she was held at knifepoint (a nurse, Patti had access to drugs that gang members wanted). Sam and Joanne started 1967 with major decisions. Sam offered to sell the Motor Haven Inn for her, while Joanne cut off her excess hair, which she had grown while married to Arthur. It was a soap event when Joanne took off her kerchief to show a modern hairstyle—one of her gifts to Sam.

While very devoted to one another, both Sam and Joanne were over the age of 40 and wished to take things slowly. In 1969, Sam proposed to Jo, with a wedding planned for 1970. However, Sam went on a trip to Africa and was presumed dead, leaving Joanne devastated. He later returned to town (then played by George Gaynes), but they could not rekindle their old feelings.

Later that year, Joanne lost her eyesight in a car accident, and neurosurgeon Tony Vincente saved her life. She regained her vision and fell in love with her doctor, whom she married in 1972. The actor who played Tony, Anthony George, did not like how his character developed, and he was written out in June 1975 as Tony died of a heart attack in Jo's arms. At the age of 50, Joanne had endured the deaths of four significant others. Another devastating blow came in 1976 when her sister Eunice, who had long since given up her scheming ways and reformed, was fatally shot by her husband's mistress. After Eunice's death, Joanne adopted her niece, Suzi Martin.

In 1976, Joanne teamed up with her best friend Stu Bergman and bought the Hartford House, turning it into an upscale bed and breakfast. She ran this business until the inn was destroyed in an explosion in 1982. After Hartford House, Jo became a hostess for a tavern along the Henderson River called "The Riverboat," which Stu, Jenny (Linda Gibboney) and Wendy ran. It too was destroyed when Travis (Rod Arrants) met his demise against Warren (Michael Corbett) and Ringo Altman (Larry Fleischman).

Starting in the mid-1970s, Joanne was showcased less on the program. She became rivals with Stephanie Wilkins, who had an affair with her third husband, Tony, and later married John Wyatt, her former brother-in-law, out of spite. Joanne's final stories involved her romance with Martin Tourneur (John Aniston), whom she married in 1980. They later divorced, which was considered a scandal because it was Joanne's first divorce. Mary Stuart confessed that because she had divorced him because of his infidelity, she laughingly considered herself the "world's oldest ingenue".

In early 1985, Jo's granddaughter Sarah Whitting (Michelle Joyner) came to town to pursue a music career as a folk singer. Sarah was hiding out inside an abandoned building in Henderson. One day it caught fire, and Wendy and Quinn saved her life. When Sarah recovered after the fire, she told Jo that she left Seattle because there were problems with Patti and Len, her parents. Sarah also helped Jo and Stu turn the abandoned building that caught fire into another upscale bed and breakfast called Caldwell House, which was operated by a scheming man named Melvin Hibbard (Ralph Byers).

In October 1985, Jo received a letter from one of her ex-husbands, Martin Tourneur, that said he was in trouble. Jo flew to San Marcos to search for him but was unsuccessful. As she was about to return home, some people who were after Martin abducted but eventually released her, unharmed. Jo then returned to Henderson and received a telegram from Martin, who said he was no longer in San Marcos but he was somewhere safe. He also told Jo that he still loved her. While Jo sought information through Hogan McCleary, Adair McCleary and Chase Kendall went to San Marcos in search of Martin. Adair and Chase found Estelle Kendall: T.R.'s, Alex, Steve, and Chase's mother, also Lloyd's wife, who had supposedly died years ago. Estelle learned about what had happened to Martin through Adair and Chase. After hearing about recent events in San Marcos through the Henderson Herald newspaper, Jo became concerned along with Hogan about Bragg (Viggo Mortensen), the man who was hired by Hogan McCleary to investigate Martin and his connections to San Marcos.

In November 1985, Jo was devastated when her granddaughter Sarah Whitting was murdered by her business partner for The Caldwell House, Melvin Hibbard, who at the time was plotting to destroy Joanne and her bed and breakfast. With Sarah dead, Melvin kidnapped Jo for revenge and so that he could kill her too and then ruin the Caldwell House. After her ordeal with Sarah's death and her kidnapping situation, Jo went to confront Estelle Kendall (Domini Blythe) about her connections to Martin, the island of San Marcos, and Rivera (Lloyd Battista); afterwards, Jo blamed Estelle for all that she had done to Martin during their love affair. While still sad over the death of Sarah, Jo, Stu, Cagney, Suzi, Bela and Wendy all believed that Melvin Hibbard didn't kill Sarah, thus coming to the conclusion that someone else did. It turned out there was a serial killer loose in the town of Henderson; the killer eventually murdered Stephanie Wyatt (Maree Cheatham, Louise Shaffer) in February 1986, right before the major flood that wiped out almost all of Henderson.

On Christmas Day in 1985, her daughter Patti came back to town after not being in Henderson for eight years. She had divorced her husband, Len, who remained in Seattle with his mother. Patti returned partially to bring closure to the murder of her daughter, Sarah.

In February 1986, a major flood caused much destruction for the town of Henderson. Jo almost died but was rescued by Hogan (David Forsyth) and Patty (Jacqueline Schultz). Jo then helped others get back on their feet following the flood. The Caldwell House survived, but many residents died or were missing, and buildings were destroyed. Robert Olsen (Nicholas Hormann) made an offer to Jo after he resigned his position at the Liberty House. Jo decided not to run the Caldwell House anymore and to start a new bed-and-breakfast called "Liberty House".

In October 1986, Jo was devastated when her niece Suzi McCleary (Eunice's daughter) was killed by an unstable woman, Ella Hobbs (Ann Flood), who wanted revenge from the McCleary family after a payroll robbery that Ella was involved in with her lover, Judge Jeremiah Henderson (William Prince), years earlier with Suzi's husband's father, Malcolm McCleary (Patrick Tovatt). It turned out the Malcolm was alive and fled to Ireland and that his twin brother was the one that was killed in the payroll robbery, not him. While the McClearys were about to reunite with the patriarch of the family, Ella was about to kill Jo, when she was held hostage in the elevator shaft at Liberty House. But Stu, Evie, Cagney, Jerry and Jeremiah rescued Jo, and Ella fell to her death.

On December 26, 1986 (the final episode Of Search For Tomorrow), Jo watched Patti marrying Hogan McCleary. Later in the evening, Stu Bergman asked Jo, "What is it, Jo, what is it you're searching for?". She replied, "Tomorrow, and I can't wait!" They then hugged as they looked back on thirty-five years of friendship.

== Sources ==
- Baldwin, Faith, Search for Tomorrow, Popular Library, 1966.
- LaGuardia, Robert, From Ma Perkins To Mary Hartman: The Illustrated History of Soap Operas, New York: Ballantine Books, 1977.
- LaGuardia, Robert, Soap World, New York: Arbor House, 1983.
- LaGuardia, Robert, The Wonderful World of TV Soap Opera, New York: Ballantine Books, 1974, revised 1977.
