= Terry O'Sullivan =

American actor

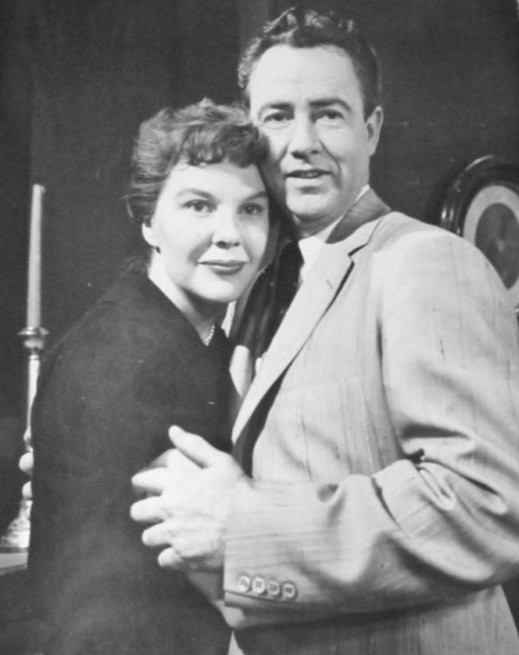
- O'Sullivan as Arthur Tate with Mary Stuart (Joanne Tate)-Search for Tomorrow
- Born: July 7, 1915; Kansas City, Missouri, U.S.
- Died: September 14, 2006 (aged 91); St. Paul, Minnesota, U.S.
- Occupation: Actor

Terry O'Sullivan (July 7, 1915 – September 14, 2006) was an American actor, best known for his role on the soap opera Search for Tomorrow as Arthur Tate (1952–1955, 1956–1966).

== Early years ==
A naive of Kansas City, O'Sullivan was the son of Mr. and Mrs. T. A. O'Sullivan. His father worked in grain and milling, and he had two sisters. He graduated from Southwest High School in Kansas City and attended Rockhurst College.

== Career ==
O'Sullivan gained early experience working as an announcer and actor on radio station WDAF in Kansas City and performing in summer stock with the Hazel McOwen Players. He ventured to New York in hopes of advancing his career but returned to Kansas City discouraged after working primarily in stock theater for one year. He worked at KXBY radio in Kansas City before moving to a station in Joplin, Missouri. After Joplin he worked at WKY radio in Oklahoma City for 3 1/2 years. O'Sullivan's first network announcing job was for the Horace Heidt program. He went on to be the announcer for Glamour Manor and programs of Red Skelton, Jack Smith, and others.

In the Arthur Tate role, he received the TV-Radio Mirror Award for Best Daytime Drama Actor three years in a row (1953–1955). When his character was written out of Search for Tomorrow, he played the role of Richard Hunter on Days of Our Lives (1966–68). He also played Judge Sam Stevens on The Secret Storm (1968–1969) before officially retiring from television roles in 1970 and relocating to Minnetonka, Minnesota.

== Death ==
O'Sullivan died on September 14, 2006, in St. Paul, Minnesota, after having pancreatic cancer.
