= Roy Winsor =

American soap opera writer, creator and novelist (1912–1987)

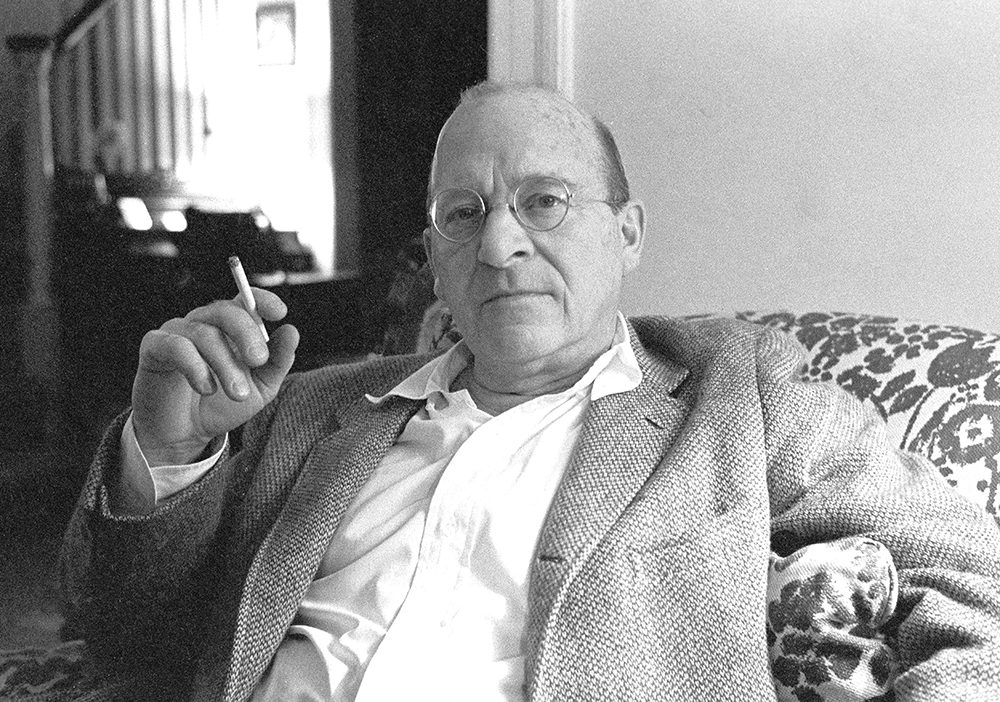
- Born: Roy William Winsor; April 13, 1912; Chicago, Illinois, United States
- Died: May 31, 1987 (aged 75); Pelham Manor, New York, United States
- Occupations: American soap opera writer and creator, novelist

Roy William Winsor (April 13, 1912 – May 31, 1987) was an American soap opera writer, creator, producer and mystery novelist. He created three of the longest running soap operas in US television history.

== Biography ==
Winsor was born in Chicago, Illinois, on April 13, 1912, and graduated from Harvard College. Before he created television soap operas, he wrote for many radio serials. He also produced the Western show Have Gun – Will Travel for the radio. In 1951 he created the long-running soap opera Search for Tomorrow (1951–1986). For Search for Tomorrow, he first worked with fellow soap opera writer Agnes Nixon. The same year he created Love of Life (1951–1980). Three years later he would create another long-running soap opera The Secret Storm (1954–1974).

He produced episodes for situation comedies such as I Love Lucy and My Little Margie. He created Ben Jerrod in 1963, the first daytime TV drama to be entirely broadcast in color.

The year before The Secret Storm ended, he would take over as head writer of the NBC soap opera Somerset; he wrote for the show from 1973 to 1974. In 1981, after a long break, he returned to soap operas and co-created (with Bob Aaron) the serial Another Life (1981–1984) for Christian Broadcasting Network. Winsor described the family at the center of Another Life as held together by values such as "discipline, loyalty, and moral standards", which he said have been "abused and scoffed at in today's world."

He was the author of three mystery novels, including The Corpse That Walked, which won an Edgar Award from the Mystery Writers of America in 1975 for Best Paperback Original. He also wrote Three Motives for Murder, and Always Lock Your Bedroom Door.

Winsor died on May 31, 1987, of a heart attack at the age of 75 in Pelham Manor, New York.
