= Ann Williams (actress) =

American actress

- Born: May 18, 1935; Washington, D.C., United States
- Died: December 13, 1985 (aged 50); Bedford, New York
- Other names: Ann Welch
- Occupation: Actress
- Spouse: Robert Daniel Peter Welch
- Children: 4

Ann Morgan Williams (May 18, 1935 – December 13, 1985) was an American television, soap opera and Broadway actress.

== Career ==
A native of Washington, D.C., Williams' early roles included Vivienne Choiseul in the October 1961 Naked City episode "Dead on the Field of Honor", and Erica Brandt on the soap opera Young Doctor Malone from 1962 to 1963. Williams appeared on Broadway in 1963 as Frances Black in The Milk Train Doesn't Stop Here Anymore by Tennessee Williams. She portrayed the first Dr. Maggie Fielding Powers on The Doctors from 1963 to 1965, and was perhaps best known for her role as the second Eunice Gardner Wyatt on Search for Tomorrow from 1966 to 1976. In 1970, Williams portrayed Karen Richards in the original Broadways cast of the musical Applause. She next played television station owner Margo Huntington Dorn on The Edge of Night from 1978 to 1980. Williams' last soap opera role was as alcoholic June Slater on Loving in 1983.

== Personal life ==
Williams had four children with husband Robert Daniel Peter Welch, who died April 21, 1982: Amanda, Elizabeth, Daniel and Diana Welch.

Williams died from cancer on December 13, 1985, in Bedford, New York.

Three of the four Welch children were minors at the time Williams died, and they were split up and put in the care of different family friends. The four siblings wrote a book about their family life after their parents' untimely deaths, The Kids Are All Right: A Memoir.
