= Val Dufour =

American actor (1927–2000)

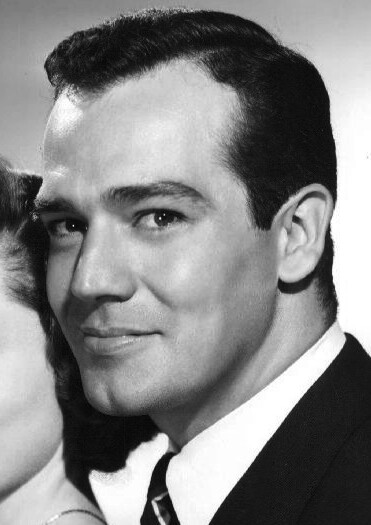
- Dufour in First Love, 1954
- Born: Albert Valéry Dufour II; February 5, 1927; New Orleans, Louisiana, US
- Died: July 27, 2000 (aged 73); New York City, US
- Years active: 1952–2000

Albert Valéry Dufour II (February 5, 1927 – July 27, 2000), known as Val Dufour, was an American actor.

== Early years ==
Dufour was born in New Orleans, Louisiana. His parents, Mr. and Mrs. A. V. Dufour, were of Parisian French descent. He majored in education, music, and speech at Louisiana State University.

== Career ==
Dufour went to New York in 1949; there he acted in theaters and performed in minstrel shows and night clubs. He worked as an elevator operator and taught acting to supplement his income from entertaining.

Early in his career, Dufour acted in Best Foot Forward in summer stock theater in Guilford, Connecticut. On Broadway he portrayed the sheriff in The Grass Harp (1952) and Abraham Levy in Abie's Irish Rose (1954). He also performed in the Chicago company of Mr. Roberts.

Dufour first appeared on episodic television in 1952, and amassed appearances on over a dozen series. He was best known for his role as John Wyatt on the soap opera Search for Tomorrow, which he played from 1972 to 1979. Dufour won a Daytime Emmy Award for his performance in 1977. Before his debut on Search for Tomorrow, Dufour was also noted for his role as Walter Curtin on Another World from 1967 to 1972 and for his role of Andre Lazar on The Edge of Night.

== Personal life and death ==
Dufour died in New York City on July 27, 2000, of cancer.

== Filmography ==
Year	Title	Role	Notes
1956	Gunsmoke	Day Barrett & Jerry Shad	Two episodes
1957	The Undead	Quintus Ratcliff	
1958	Gunsmoke	Beaudry	S3E39 - “Gentleman’s Disagreement”
1959	Rawhide	Luke Storm	S1E1 - “Incident of the Tumbleweed”
1961	Gunsmoke	Outlaw Cooner	S7E14 “A Man A Day”
