= Search for Tomorrow =

American soap opera (1951–86)

- Genre: Soap opera
- Created by: Roy Winsor
- Starring: Mary Stuart; Larry Haines
- Announcer: Dwight Weist
- Composer: Dick Hyman
- Country of origin: United States
- Original language: English
- No. of seasons: 35
- No. of episodes: 9,130

Production
- Camera setup: Multi-camera
- Running time: 15 minutes (1951–68); 30 minutes (1968–86)
- Production company: Procter & Gamble Productions

Original release
- Network: CBS
- Release: September 3, 1951 – March 26, 1982
- Network: NBC
- Release: March 29, 1982 – December 26, 1986

Search for Tomorrow is an American television soap opera. It began its run on CBS on September 3, 1951, and concluded on NBC, 35 years later, on December 26, 1986.

Set in the fictional town of Henderson in an unspecified state, the show focused primarily on the character of Joanne "Jo" Gardner, portrayed by Mary Stuart for the entire run of the series.

== Broadcast history and production notes ==
Created by Roy Winsor, Search for Tomorrow was originally written by Agnes Nixon (then known professionally as Agnes Eckhardt) for the series' first 13 weeks, before Irving Vendig assumed head writing duties. The program was one of several daytime soap operas produced from the 1950s through the 1980s by Procter & Gamble Productions, the broadcasting arm of the famed household products corporation. Procter & Gamble used the program, as well as the company's other serials, to advertise its products (such as its Joy dishwashing liquid and Spic and Span household cleaner). As Search's ratings increased, other sponsors began buying commercial time during the program.

Search for Tomorrow initially aired as a 15-minute serial from its debut in 1951 until 1968, at 12:30 p.m. Eastern/11:30 a.m. Central Time. The serial discontinued live broadcasts in favor of recorded telecasts in March 1967, began broadcasting in color on September 11, 1967, and expanded to a half-hour on September 9, 1968, keeping the 12:30/11:30 slot, while its old 15-minute partner The Guiding Light also expanded to 30 minutes and moved to the CBS afternoon lineup at 2:30/1:30. At the time, Search for Tomorrow and The Guiding Light, which had shared the same half-hour for sixteen years, were the last two 15-minute daytime programs airing on television. Search for Tomorrow would remain the top-rated show at 12:30/11:30 well into the late 1970s, despite strong competition from shows like NBC's The Who, What, or Where Game and ABC's Split Second and Ryan's Hope.

On June 8, 1981, CBS moved Search for Tomorrow from its longtime 12:30 p.m./11:30 a.m. Central time slot, which it had held for 30 years, to the 2:30/1:30 p.m. time slot between its two P&G sister shows, As the World Turns and Guiding Light, in order to accommodate the hit serial The Young and the Restless. Procter & Gamble urged CBS to return Search for Tomorrow to its former slot. The program's relocation confused or angered many longtime viewers habituated to seeing it earlier in the day. Another P&G-produced soap opera, The Edge of Night, had suffered the same problem six years earlier when the company insisted that the show be moved to the 2:30/1:30 p.m. time slot; it had previously dominated the other two networks in the ratings when the show was airing at 3:30/2:30 p.m. for almost a decade. This move was made on CBS part to give The Young and the Restless a half-hour head start on ABC's All My Children, which was part of the trio of ABC soaps, along with One Life to Live and General Hospital, that led the network to dominate the top three spots in the daytime ratings (an achievement ABC first reached during the 1980–81 season) at the time. CBS refused to move Search for Tomorrow back to its original 12:30/11:30 time slot and, as the show's contract with CBS was about to expire, Procter & Gamble sold the broadcast rights to Search for Tomorrow to NBC rather than negotiate a renewal with CBS. NBC already had two soaps produced by P&G, Another World and its Dallas-inspired spin-off Texas, as part of its daytime lineup. Search for Tomorrow aired its last episode on CBS on March 26, 1982, and had its NBC premiere the following Monday, March 29; CBS filled the program's former time slot with a new political soap opera, Capitol.

The shift from CBS to NBC would prove to be the beginning of the serial's terminal decline. At its new network, Search for Tomorrow now found itself going head-to-head with its former CBS stablemate The Young and the Restless and would later face additional soap competition when Loving premiered on ABC in June 1983. Additionally, several NBC-affiliated stations opted to run syndicated programming in the 12:30/11:30 slot, a practice dating back to NBC's daytime ratings struggles in the 1970s that also affected already struggling soap opera The Doctors, which was airing at 12:30/11:30, until NBC bumped it to 12:00/11:00 (the fourth and final time slot that the show occupied during its 19-year run) to accommodate Search for Tomorrow. (The Doctors, along with Texas, were both canceled at the end of 1982.) As a result, Search for Tomorrow's ratings plummeted through its four-year run on NBC and never recovered; it was among the lowest-rated soaps on television at the time, kept alive mainly by its hardcore and largely elderly fans. As such, the show was increasingly unappealing to advertisers other than P&G. (The Edge of Night faced similar issues following its move to ABC in the 4:00/3:00 timeslot, where it did only slightly better in the ratings, before being cancelled in 1984 due to the erosion of its overall ratings caused in part by affiliate preemptions for syndicated programming.)

On August 4, 1983, both the master copy and the backup of an episode of Search for Tomorrow scheduled for that day were reported missing, and the cast was forced to do a live show for the first time since the transition to recorded broadcasts 16 years earlier. It was the first live daytime serial since two other CBS soaps, As the World Turns and The Edge of Night, had discontinued the practice in 1975; to date, the only other soap operas to have done live episodes in any capacity since – albeit as programming stunts – were ABC's One Life to Live (for a one-week "sweeps" stint from May 13–17, 2002) and General Hospital (for two episodes on May 15 and 18, 2015).

In the fall of 1986, NBC announced that Search for Tomorrow would be canceled, citing its declining ratings. The show aired its 9,130th and final episode on December 26, 1986, after 35 years on the air. At the time of its cancellation, it was the longest-running daytime program in American television history, but has since been surpassed by other shows. The following Monday, the game show Wordplay took over the 12:30 p.m. Eastern time slot.

=== Syndication ===
From 1987 until the summer of 1989, reruns of Search for Tomorrow aired late nights on the USA Network. The cable network aired episodes from the first three years on NBC (1982–1985), along with its sister P&G soap The Edge of Night.

In 2006, P&G began making several of its soap operas available, a few episodes at a time, through America Online's AOL Video service, downloadable free of charge. Reruns of Search for Tomorrow began with the October 5, 1984, episode and ceased with the January 13, 1986, episode after AOL discontinued the P&G Soaps Channel on December 31, 2008.

=== Executive producers ===
Duration	Name
September 3, 1951 – November 1, 1968	Roy Winsor
November 4, 1968 – December 31, 1971	Robert M. Driscoll
June 23, 1975 – November 20, 1981	Mary-Ellis Bunim
November 23, 1981 – November 21, 1985	Robert Costello
November 22, 1985 – March 25, 1986	John Whitesell
March 26, 1986 – December 26, 1986	John Whitesell and David Lawrence

=== Head writers ===
Duration	Name
September 3, 1951 – November 30, 1951	Agnes Nixon
December 3, 1951 – November 26, 1956	Irving Vendig
November 27, 1956 – December 27, 1957	Charles Gussman
December 30, 1957 – June 5, 1964	Frank and Doris Hursley
June 8, 1964 – December 31, 1968	Julian Funt and David Lesan
January 2, 1969 – October 23, 1970	Leonard Kantor and Doris Frankel
October 26, 1970 – February 16, 1971	Lou Scofield
February 17-September 17, 1971	Robert Soderberg and Edith Sommer
September 20, 1971 – December 25, 1973	Ralph Ellis and Eugenie Hunt
December 26, 1973 – May 24, 1974	Theodore Apstein
May 27 – June 21, 1974	Gillian Houghton
June 24, 1974 – November 18, 1975	Ann Marcus
November 19, 1975 – December 10, 1976	Peggy O'Shea
December 13, 1976 – August 2, 1977	Irving and Tex Elman
August 3, 1977 – March 24, 1978	Robert J. Shaw
March 27 – August 18, 1978	Henry Slesar
August 21, 1978 – May 9, 1980	John William Corrington and Joyce Hooper Corrington
May 12 – October 3, 1980	Linda Grover and John Porterfield
October 6, 1980 – March 27, 1981	Gillian Houghton
March 30, 1981 – April 10, 1981	Harding Lemay
April 13 – May 15, 1981	1981 Writers Guild of America strike
May 18 – December 11, 1981	Don Chastain
December 14, 1981 – December 31, 1982	Ralph Ellis and Eugenie Hunt
January 3 – May 31, 1983	C. David Colson
June 1, 1983 – April 13, 1984	Gary Tomlin
April 16 – June 22, 1984	Jeanne Glynn and Madeline David
June 25, 1984 – March 22, 1985	Jeanne Glynn and Caroline Franz
March 25 – October 25, 1985	Paul Avila Mayer and Stephanie Braxton
October 28, 1985 – July 25, 1986	Gary Tomlin
July 28 – December 26, 1986	Pamela K. Long and Addie Walsh

== Cast and characters ==
Actor	Character	Duration
Jay Acovone	Brian Emerson	1982–84
Frieda Altman	Mrs. Miller, the housekeeper	1969–71
John Aniston	Martin Tourneur	1979–84
Rod Arrants	Travis Sentell	1978–84
Lewis Arlt	David Sutton	1976–81
Matthew Ashford	Cagney McLeary	1984–86
Nelson Aspen	Albert Prange	1985–86
Kevin Bacon	Todd Adamson	1979
Angela Bassett	Selina McCulla	1985
Kathleen Beller	Liza Walton	1972–74
Meg Bennett	Liza Walton	1974–76
Neil Billingsley	Danny Walton	1975–77
Domini Blythe	Estelle Kendall	1985–86
Marion Brash	Eunice Gardner Wyatt	1957–61, 1969
Philip Brown	Steve Kendall	1982–83
J. Kenneth Campbell	Roy Arnold	1985
Robert Curtis Brown	Alec Kendall	1984–85
Hope Busby	Liza Walton	1977–78
David Canary	Arthur Benson	1978
Melanie Chartoff	Nancy Craig	1976
Maree Cheatham	Stephanie Wyatt	1974–84
Jill Clayburgh	Grace Bolton	1969
Kevin Conroy	Chase Kendall	1984–85
Joan Copeland	Andrea Whiting	1967-72
Michael Corbett	Warren Carter	1982–85
Colleen Dion-Scotti	Evie Stone	1985–86
Val Dufour	John Wyatt	1972–79
Olympia Dukakis	Barbara Moreno	1983
George Ebeling	Peter Rand	1963
Terri Eoff	Susan Wyatt	1984–86
Morgan Fairchild	Jennifer Pace	1973–77
Larry Flieschman	Ringo Altman	1982–83
David Forsyth	Hogan McCleary	1983–86
David Gale	Rusty Sentell Sr.	1982–83
Jennifer Gatti	Angela Moreno	1983
Anthony George	Tony Vicente	1970–75
Cynthia Gibb	Susan Wyatt Carter	1981–83
Louan Gideon	Liza Walton	1985–86
Stacey Glick	Andy McNeil	1982–83
Nicolette Goulet	Kathy Phillips Taper	1979–82
Marian Hailey	Janet Collins	1971
Larry Haines	Stu Bergman	1951–86
Ron Hale	Walt Driscoll	1969
Brett Halsey	Clay Collins	1975
Bethany Hanes	Victoria Carson	1977
Page Hannah	Adair McCleary	1984–85
Peter Haskell	Lloyd Kendall	1983–85
Michael Hawkins	Steve Haskins	1967
Jo Henderson	Kate McCleary	1984–85
Joel Higgins	Bruce Carson	1977
Lois Holmes	Mrs. Miller, the housekeeper	1971—72
John James	Tom Bergman	1977
Don Knotts	Wilbur Peterson	1953-55
Jane Krakowski	T.R. Kendall	1984–86
Joe Lambie	Lloyd Kendall	1985–86
Mark Lenard	Nathan Walsh	1959–60
Audra Lindley	Sue Knowles	1962
Mitch Litrofsky	Thomas "Trip" Bergman	1981–83
Richard Lohman	Gary Walton	1975–77
Carl Low	Bob Rogers	1965–83
Christopher Lowe	Eric Leshinski	1969–78
Robert Mandan	Sam Reynolds	1965–70
Sherry Mathis	Liza Walton	1978–85
Andrea McArdle	Wendy Wilkins	1977
Jane McArthur	Marian Rand	1963
Marcia McCabe	Sunny Adamson	1978–86
Marilyn McIntyre	Carolyn Hanley	1977–80
Jeffrey Meek	Quinn McCleary	1984–86
Stacey Moran	Susan Wyatt	1977–80
Denise Nickerson	Liza Walton	1971–72
Michael Nouri	Steve Kaslow	1975–78
Terry O'Sullivan	Arthur Tate	1952–66
Tina Orr	Meredith Hartford	1977–78
Will Patton	Kentucky Bluebird	1984–85
Anne Pearson	Allison Metcalf	1959–65
Patsy Pease	Cissie Mitchell Sentell	1978–84
Lisa Peluso	Wendy Wilkins Carter	1977–85
Michelle Phillips	Ruby Ashford	1983
Gene Pietragallo	Brian Emerson	1981–82
Brett Porter	Brett Hamilton III	1984–85
Melba Rae	Marge Bergman	1951–71
Leslie Ann Ray	Donna Davis	1977–78
Sandy Robinson	Janet Collins	1956–61
Robert Rockwell	Greg Hartford	1977–78
Frank Schofield	John Austin	1963
Louise Shaffer	Stephanie Wyatt	1984–86
Fran Sharon	Janet Collins	1961–65
Courtney Simon	Kathy Phillips	1971–79; 1984
Peter Simon	Scott Phillips	1969–79
Marcus Smythe	Dane Taylor	1982–83
Ellen Spencer	Janet Collins	1951–56
Ralph Stantley	Lloyd Gibson	1963
Leslie Stevens	Justine Calvert	1984–85
Douglas Stevenson	Lee Sentell	1980–82
Adam Storke	Andrew Ryder	1985
Mary Stuart	Joanne Gardner	1951–86
Tom Sullivan	Michael Kendall	1983
Millee Taggart	Janet Collins	1971–82
Wayne Tippit	Ted Adamson	1980–82
Gary Tomlin	Bruce Carson	1973–74
Patrick Tovatt	Matt McCleary	1986
Martin Vidnovic	Cord Tourneur	1984
Douglass Watson	Walter Haskins	1960s (Note: There are conflicting sources on when Watson appeared on the soap opera; some say that he debuted in 1966, whilst others say 1967, and it is conflicted whether he last appeared in 1966, 1967 or 1968.)
Billie Lou Watt	Ellie Harper Bergman	1968–81
Ann Williams	Eunice Gardner Wyatt	1966–76
Marian Woods	Victoria Windsor	1984
Anne Wyndham	Amy Carson	1975–77

== Awards ==
=== Daytime Emmy Award wins ===
==== Drama performer categories ====
Category	Recipient	Role	Year
Lead Actor	Larry Haines; Val Dufour	Stu Bergman; John Wyatt	1976
Supporting Actor	Larry Haines	Stu Bergman	1981

==== Other categories ====
- 1986 "Outstanding Achievement in Music Direction and Composition for a Drama Series"
- 1978 "Outstanding Individual Achievement in Daytime Programming: Costume Designer" (Connie Wexler)

=== Other awards ===
- Writers Guild of America Award (1974, 1975, 1985)
