= Mary Stuart (actress) =

American actress (1926–2002)

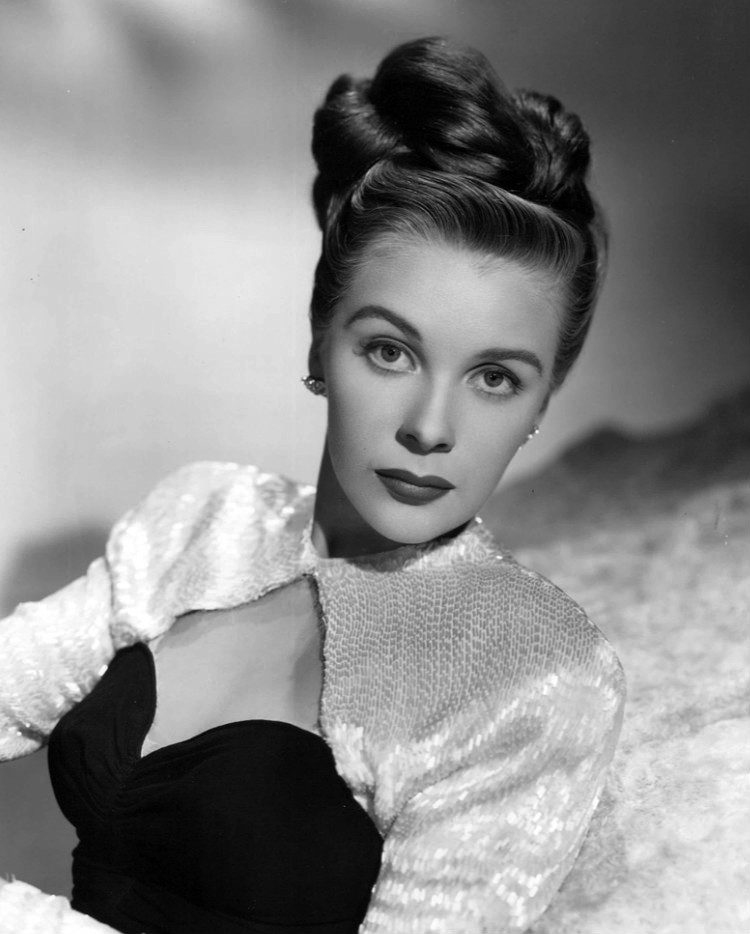
- Stuart in 1947
- Born: Mary Stuart Houchins; July 4, 1926; Miami, Florida, U.S.
- Died: February 28, 2002 (aged 75); New York City, U.S.
- Occupations: Actress; Guitarist; Singer; Songwriter
- Years active: 1941–2002
- Spouses: Richard Krolik (m. 1951; div. 1966) Wolfgang Neumann (m. 1986)
- Children: 2
- Awards: Lifetime Achievement Award (1985)
- Website: marystuart.org

Mary Stuart (born Mary Stuart Houchins; July 4, 1926 – February 28, 2002) was an American actress, guitarist, singer, and songwriter.

A former silver screen starlet, she was best known for her starring role as Joanne on the CBS/NBC soap opera Search for Tomorrow, which she played for 35 years without interruption (1951–86).

After her divorce from her first husband, with whom she raised two children, she began a side career as a guitarist and a singer-songwriter, first singing on Search for Tomorrow and then releasing her own album in 1973.

At the time of her death, she had played the role of Meta Bauer on the CBS soap opera Guiding Light for six years. For her work in daytime drama, she was given the Lifetime Achievement Daytime Emmy.

== Early years ==
Stuart was born Mary Stuart Houchins in Miami, Florida, on July 4, 1926, to Guy M. and Mary (née Stuart) Houchins. She grew up in Tulsa, Oklahoma. Stuart started performing in her youth, and at the age of 9 she was selected by Count Basie Orchestra to perform with them at two of their shows. Her eventual stage name was her mother's maiden name.

Stuart graduated from Tulsa Central High School and attended the University of Tulsa, where she majored in speech and drama, before embarking on her professional career. She was a member of Delta Delta sorority at the university. She worked briefly for the Tulsa Tribune newspaper and worked with the Tulsa Little Theater.

She left home at age 17 for New York City. Upon arriving in New York she worked as a model and nightclub photographer at the Roosevelt Hotel.

While working at the hotel, Stuart met film producer Joe Pasternak. After a screen test, Pasternak told Stuart "you can't sing, you can't walk, but there is something that you have. Let's figure out what it is." She signed a seven-year contract with Metro-Goldwyn-Mayer in 1946.

== Television Career and Search for Tomorrow ==
CBS offered Stuart a role in their new soap opera, The First Hundred Years.

In 1951, Stuart was cast as housewife Joanne Gardner in Search for Tomorrow. Stuart was the first actress to have her real life pregnancy written into the show, and was filmed at the hospital after giving birth to her son in 1956.

In 1953 she was named Favorite Daytime TV Serial Actress by Radio-TV Mirror magazine for her role in Search for Tomorrow.

For her performance, Stuart was the first soap opera actress to be nominated for an Emmy in 1962, before the creation of the Daytime Emmy Awards, and was nominated at the 1st Daytime Emmy Awards in 1974, but lost to Elizabeth Hubbard. Stuart later received two additional nominations at the Daytime Emmys for Outstanding Lead Actress in a Drama Series in 1976 and 1977. In 1985, she earned a Lifetime Achievement Emmy from the Academy of Television Arts & Sciences.

Search for Tomorrow was initially cancelled in 1982 by CBS, and was picked up by NBC, until it was canceled again in 1986 due to poor ratings and low viewership.

At the time of its second cancellation, Search for Tomorrow ran for thirty-five years. At the time of its final cancelation it was the longest-running soap opera on television. Stuart was the only cast member to last the entire duration of the show.

== Film and musical career ==
=== Film ===
After her screentest with Joe Pasternak, Stuart began working in Hollywood. Her roles were usually small, but sometimes with leading actors of the time, including Ronald Reagan in The Girl from Jones Beach, Errol Flynn in Adventures of Don Juan, Clark Gable in The Hucksters, Esther Williams in This Time for Keeps and Henry Fonda and Lucille Ball in The Big Street.

Stuart said about her work in films, "When the elevator doors opened and a girl said, 'Going up,' that was me. In the scenes where the secretary said, 'Mr. Smith will see you now,' that was me." She also had roles in B Western films. After four years in Hollywood, she returned to New York City.

=== Music ===
In 1956, Stuart recorded Joanne Sings, an album of songs for children from the perspective of her Search for Tomorrow character. Stuart and Percy Faith collaborated on the album.

Stuart's musical ability was put to use on Search for Tomorrow, with her character often singing, and Stuart herself writing songs occasionally for the show. Stuart also sang and played guitar on Christmas episodes, including, but not limited to, one notable Christmas in which Stuart sang "Bring a Torch, Jeanette, Isabella" with actresses Ann Williams and Melissa Murphy, who played her sister and daughter at that time.

Stuart collaborated with Michel Legrand in 1973 for her self-titled album Mary Stuart. Stuart performed at her first public concert on January 8, 1974, at Catawba College in Salisbury, North Carolina.

== Later career ==
Executive producer Paul Rauch offered her the role of the crooked Judge Webber on ABC's One Life to Live which she played in 1988, then settled into retirement, having worked nearly 40 years. She wrote a short story that was published in a magazine, which was eventually made into a CBS movie of the week.

Stuart started the New York Chapter of SAG-AFTRA Foundation Book PALS, which stood for Performing Artists for Literacy in Schools. The promoted childhood literacy by using performing artists in the classroom. Stuart frequently read to schoolchildren, and started six reading clubs in New York schools.

In 1996, she came out of retirement and accepted the role of Meta Bauer, Ed's aunt who became a confidante of his daughter, Michelle, on Guiding Light, a part which had been played earlier by Ellen Demming.

== Personal life ==
Stuart married Lester, a painter and set designer and one of the resident set designers for Oliver Rea, one of the founders of the Guthrie Theater in Minneapolis. They later divorced.

Stuart married Richard Krolik in August 1951. Richard was a captain in the United States Army Air Corps during World War II, and worked for Time Inc. Krolik produced the television version of The March of Time. She gave birth to their daughter, Cynthia in 1955, and their son Jeffrey in 1956.

In her 1980 book Both of Me, Stuart details the struggles encountered as a working mother and actress, and issues within her marriage to Krolik. In the 1960s, Stuart wrote on her struggles with mental health medicating by drinking "two Martinis" and taking "two five-milligram tranquilizers" daily.

Stuart wrote on her marriage to Krolik, his frequent disinterest in her work, coldness towards her interests, and frequent belittling. One such incident was a book she wrote and sent to a publisher. After showing him the manuscript, Krolik responded: "Hey, you wrote a book and you never read one." Stuart wrote that this incident spurred a moment of suicidal ideation, writing "I was treading water at the bottom of a well, and I needed help." Shortly after she began seeing a therapist. She and Krolik divorced in 1966.

While Jeffrey Krolik kept his birth name, Cynthia changed hers to Cynthia Stuart. Cynthia graduated from the North Carolina School of the Arts and became a journalist writing for the Detroit Free Press. She also followed in her mother's footsteps as an actress for a time. Cynthia is now COO of the Supportive Housing Network of New York.

Jeffrey graduated from Dartmouth College and became a regional sales director for HBO. He was later appointed general manager for Fox Sports Net Bay Area. Both of Stuart's children were raised and married in the Presbyterian Church.

Her third husband, Wolfgang Neumann, was an architect.

== Death ==
When she died at her home in 2002 following a stroke, it was revealed that Stuart was also suffering from gastric cancer and bone cancer. She had previously undergone an endoscopy and an operation to remove a tumor in her stomach in 1999. Stuart had battled breast cancer earlier in her life. She was survived by her widower (Wolfgang Neumann), her two children and two grandchildren.

== In popular culture ==
An apron Stuart wore while playing Jo on Search for Tomorrow currently hangs in the National Museum of American History at the Smithsonian in Washington, D.C.
