= Corday Productions =

American production company

- Company type: Production company
- Industry: Television
- Founded: 1965
- Founders: Ted Corday and Betty Corday
- Headquarters: Burbank, California
- Key people: Ken Corday (CEO and president)

Corday Productions is an American production company. The company was founded by Ted and Betty Corday in 1965. The company produces the NBC soap opera Days of Our Lives which they have produced since 1965. They are based in Burbank, California. The company is currently run by Ted and Betty Corday's son Ken Corday.

== History ==
Producer Ted Corday and his wife Betty were collaborating with William J. Bell to create a new soap opera. The concept of the soap would be centered around a family of doctors. The soap, named Days of Our Lives premiered on November 8, 1965. With the premiere of the soap also came the formation of Corday Productions.

Initially, the series was just intended for the production of Days. But the company did several different productions. The company is now run by the Corday's son Ken Corday.

== NetSoaps / Net Novellas ==
In April 2014, Corday Productions announced plans to team up with All Screens Media to form NetSoaps/Net Novellas.

The website would be a joint venture between Corday executive Ken Corday and All Screens creator Peter Heumiller. Heumiller had worked as a digital media executive for Comcast. The online network is dedicated to the soap opera and telenovela format. Net Soaps is geared toward American and English speaking audiences while Net Novelas is targeted toward Latin American and Brazilian audiences.

== Collaboration with TruLOVE ==
In October 2014, Corday announced plans to collaborate with the TruLOVE Network. TruLOVE is an online network with an extensive library of romance stories.

== Television series ==
- Morning Star (1965–1966)
- Paradise Bay (1965–1966)
- Days of Our Lives (1965–present)
- The Young and the Restless (1973–present)
