= Irving Vendig =

American screenwriter

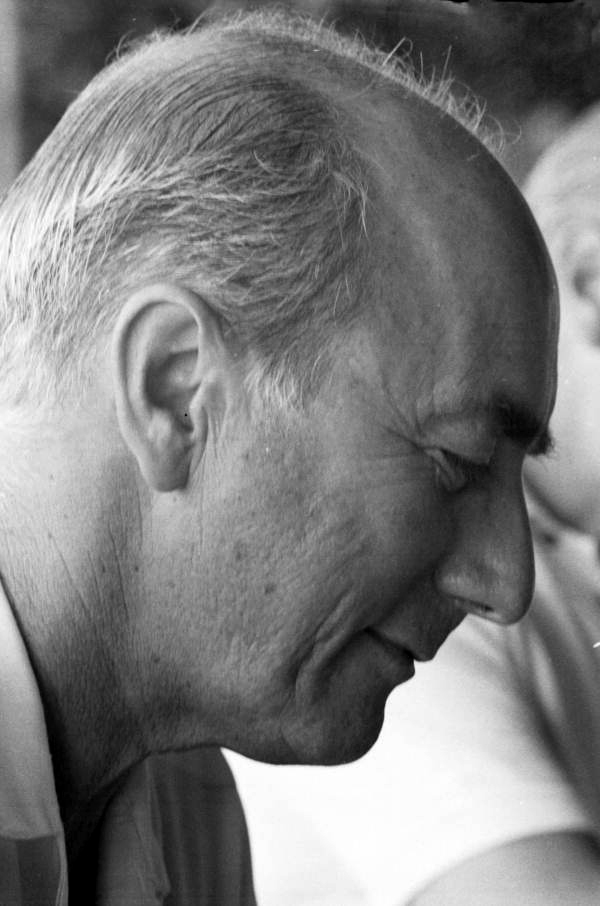
- Born: October 11, 1902; Holly Springs, Mississippi, US
- Died: January 7, 1995 (aged 92); Sarasota, Florida, US
- Occupation: Television writer
- Spouse: Phyllis Vendig
- Children: 1

Irving Vendig (October 11, 1902 – January 7, 1995) was an American soap opera writer best known for creating The Edge of Night.

== Career ==
Born in the Mississippi city of Holly Springs, Vendig created The Edge of Night for Procter and Gamble Productions and CBS Daytime in 1956. He had been a writer on the Perry Mason radio show and when Erle Stanley Gardner refused to allow the show to become a soap opera, Vendig refashioned the show into The Edge of Night, and brought actor John Larkin, who played Mason on the radio, to the show as series star Mike Karr. The character of Mike's daughter, Laurie Ann Karr, was named for Vendig's daughter Laurie Ann.

Vendig was the series' head writer from 1956 until 1960, then co-head writer with James Gentile from 1960 until 1965. Vendig was credited on-air as series' creator until his departure from the daytime drama in 1965.

He also created the NBC Daytime drama Three Steps to Heaven. He also wrote for the daytime dramas Search for Tomorrow (which he wasn't able to see at his Florida home because the local CBS affiliate didn't carry it), Paradise Bay and The Clear Horizon. He created Hidden Faces, a short-lived drama for NBC, which was similar in theme to his more famous The Edge of Night, which starred Stephen Joyce, Conard Fowkes, Louise Shaffer, Tony Lo Bianco and future Oscar nominee Linda Blair.
