= Alexander Scourby =

American actor

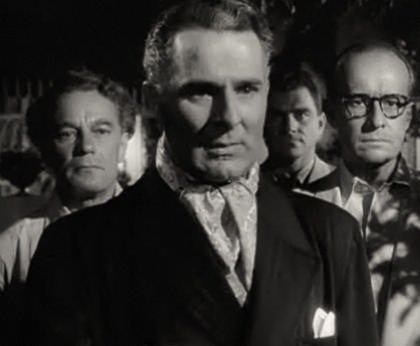
- Scourby in Affair in Trinidad
- Born: November 13, 1913; Brooklyn, New York, U.S.
- Died: February 22, 1985 (aged 71); Newtown, Connecticut, U.S.
- Occupations: Actor; voice actor
- Years active: 1932–1985
- Spouse: Lori March (m. 1943)
- Children: 1

Alexander Scourby (/ˈskɔːrbi/; November 13, 1913 – February 22, 1985) was an American film, television, and voice actor and narrator known for his deep and resonant voice and Mid-Atlantic accent. He is best known for his film role as the ruthless mob boss Mike Lagana in Fritz Lang's The Big Heat (1953), and is also particularly well-remembered in the English-speaking world for his landmark recordings of the entire King James Version audio Bible, which have been released in numerous editions. He later recorded the entire Revised Standard Version of the Bible. Scourby was an accomplished narrator, including for 18 episodes of National Geographic Specials from 1966 to 1985 (almost twice as many as any of its other narrators). Scourby recorded 422 audiobooks for the blind, which he considered his most important work.

== Early life ==
Alexander Scourby was born in Brooklyn, New York, on November 13, 1913, to Constantine Nicholas Scourby, a successful restaurateur, wholesale baker and sometime investor in independent motion-pictures, and Betsy Patsakos, a homemaker, both immigrants from Greece.

Reared in Brooklyn, Scourby was a member of a Boy Scout troop and later became a cadet with the 101st National Guard Cavalry Regiment. He attended public and private schools in Brooklyn, spending summer vacations in New Jersey, Upstate New York, and at a cousin's home in Massachusetts.

Dismissed from Polytechnic Prep School, he finished his secondary education at Brooklyn Manual Training High School which he described as "an ordinary high school that had an awful lot of shop." He was a co-editor of the school magazine and yearbook, and he envisioned a career in writing, though he later came to realize that writing was, for him, "absolutely the most painful thing in the world" and also that he "could never meet a deadline", whereas he found the reading aloud of plays easy and enjoyable. Encouraged by some of his teachers, he began to turn his attention to acting. He made his stage debut with the high school's dramatic society, as the juvenile in Augustin MacHugh's The Meanest Man in the World.

== Early career ==
Upon graduation from high school in 1931, Scourby, not yet having abandoned the prospect of a writing career, entered West Virginia University at Morgantown to study journalism. During his first semester he joined the campus drama group and played a minor role in A.A. Milne's comedy Mr. Pim Passes By. In February 1932, as he was beginning his second semester, his father died, and he left the university to help run the family's pie bakery in Brooklyn.

A month after Scourby returned to Brooklyn, he was accepted as an apprentice at Eva Le Gallienne's Civic Repertory Theatre on 14th Street in downtown Manhattan. At the Civic Repertory he was taught dancing, speech, and make-up, and was given his first professional role, a walk-on in Liliom. In 1933, Scourby and other Civic Repertory apprentices joined to form the Apprentice Theatre, which presented plays at the New School for Social Research in New York City during the 1933–34 season. His first role on Broadway was that of the player king in Leslie Howard's production of Hamlet, which opened at the Imperial Theatre on November 10, 1936, and went on tour after thirty-nine performances. Returning to New York—and unemployment—in the spring of 1937, Scourby was introduced to the American Foundation for the Blind's Talking Book program by Wesley Addy, a member of the Hamlet cast and Scourby's roommate on the tour, who was regularly recording plays for the foundation.

After a successful audition in the spring of 1937, Scourby was cast in a small part in a recording of Antony and Cleopatra. During the following summer, he was again the player king in a production of Hamlet in Dennis, Massachusetts, which featured Eva Le Gallienne. When he returned to audition for the American Foundation for the Blind later in the year, he was told that the company of actors was "filled" but that he might record a novel if he wished. "That was the beginning of it," he recalled years later, adding, "The recordings for the blind are perhaps my greatest achievement. Most of the things I look back at in the theater were either insignificant parts in great plays or good parts in terrible plays. So it really doesn't amount to anything. Whereas I have recorded some great books. The greatest one being the Bible."

Scourby is credited as Hamlet's father the King (as spirit) on the 19 September 1936 CBS radio program Columbia Workshop directed by Orson Welles, and by the early 1940s he was playing running parts in five of the serial melodramas, popularly known as soap operas, including Against the Storm, in which he replaced Arnold Moss for two years. He narrated Andre Kostelanetz' musical show for a year, using the pseudonym Alexander Scott. At the request of sponsors, his voice was heard on many dramatic shows, including NBC's Sunday program The Eternal Light (with which he was to remain, despite heavy commitments elsewhere, through the 1950s). On The Adventures of Superman, his was the voice of the title character's father Jor-El in the one program devoted to the character's origins. During World War II, Scourby's broadcasts were beamed abroad in Greek and English for the Office of War Information.

== Theater and film work ==
Scourby kept his hand in the theater by doing summer stock and a wide variety of other seasonal productions. In Maurice Evans' production of Hamlet, which opened at the St. James Theatre in New York on October 12, 1938, and ran for ninety-six performances, Scourby played Rosencrantz. Later in the same season, he appeared with Evans in Henry IV, Part 1 as the Earl of Westmoreland. The following year, he toured with Evans in Richard II as one of the hirelings of the king. He returned to Broadway years later in late 1946, replacing Ruth Chatterton as the narrator in Ben Hecht's A Flag Is Born, a one-act, dramatic pageant in which Marlon Brando had one of his early stage roles. The play was produced by the American League for a Free Palestine, at the Alvin Theatre. On December 22, 1947, he opened with John Gielgud in Rodney Ackland's dramatization of Crime and Punishment at the National Theatre in New York. He was a co-founder of New Stages, a drama company that went into operation in a small theater on Bleecker Street in Greenwich Village during the 1947–48 season. During its two-year existence, the company presented works by such artists as Federico García Lorca (Blood Wedding), Edward Caulfield (Bruno and Sidney), and two plays by Jean-Paul Sartre.

In Sidney Kingsley's Detective Story, which opened at the Hudson Theatre on March 23, 1949, and ran for a year and eight months, Scourby played Tami Giacoppetti, the tough racketeer. Almost immediately after Detective Story closed, Scourby began rehearsing another Kingsley role on Broadway, that of Ivanoff, the old Bolshevik friend of Rubashov in Darkness at Noon, a dramatization of Arthur Koestler's novel. The play opened at the Alvin Theatre on January 13, 1951, with Claude Rains playing Rubashov, and ran for 163 performances. When the Theatre Guild revived George Bernard Shaw's Saint Joan later in the same year, with Uta Hagen in the title role, Scourby was cast as Peter Cauchon, the Bishop of Beauvais. The play was presented at the Cort Theatre from October 4, 1951, to February 2, 1952.

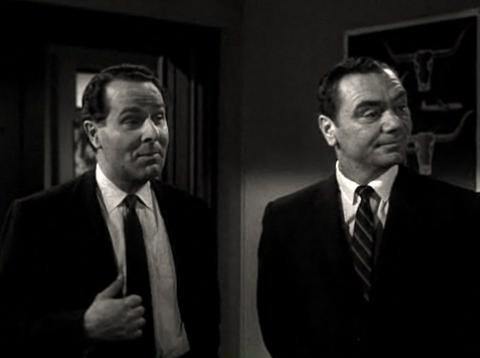
Scourby and Ernest Borgnine in Man on a String

Scourby first appeared on screen opposite Glenn Ford in Affair in Trinidad (Columbia, 1952) and The Big Heat (Columbia, 1953). He appeared again with Glenn Ford in Ransom! (MGM, 1956), later to be remade with Mel Gibson and Gary Sinise. Scourby played Dr. Mikhail Andrassy in The Shaggy Dog (1959). "None of the pictures I've done have been really important or very good", Scourby later said, "with the exception—and it is debatable—of Giant (Warner Brothers, 1956)". In the film version of Edna Ferber's novel Scourby played Polo, the old Mexican ranch foreman. He later had roles in The Big Fisherman (Buena Vista, 1959), Seven Thieves (1960), Man on a String (1960), The Devil at 4 O'Clock (1961) and The Executioner (1970). During these extremely busy years, Scourby, who had been living with his wife and child in an apartment near Columbia University in New York City, bought a home in Beverly Hills, California. Calls for Scourby to work in New York, however, soon made the Beverly Hills residence as much a commutation point as a home.

Back on the New York stage, Scourby played Rakitin in Emlyn Williams' adaptation of Turgenev's A Month in the Country and Peter Cauchon in Siobhán McKenna's interpretation of Saint Joan, both presented at the Off-Broadway Phoenix Theatre in 1956. Again at the Phoenix, he played King Claudius in Hamlet in the spring of 1961, bringing to the role, as Howard Taubman noted in The New York Times (March 17, 1961), the appropriate "fret of fear and decay."

In 1963, Scourby was given the featured role of Gorotchenko, the Communist commissar who stalks a White Russian noble couple fleeing the Revolution, in Tovarich, a Broadway musical by Lee Pockriss and Anne Croswell, based on the comedy by Robert E. Sherwood and Jacques Deval. The musical opened at the Broadway Theatre on March 18, 1963, with Vivien Leigh and Jean-Pierre Aumont as Scourby's prey. "The signal tribute to Alexander Scourby...", critic Norman Nadel wrote in his review in the New York World-Telegram and Sun (April 2, 1963), "was the hearty hissing opening night as he strolled on stage. In polished villainy, he has no peer". Shortly after Tovarich closed, on November 9, 1963, after 264 performances, Scourby began rehearsals in Los Angeles for a Theatre Group presentation of Anton Chekhov's The Sea Gull, in which he starred with Jeanette Nolan for forty performances, beginning on January 10, 1964.

In the early 1950s, Scourby worked in television as both a narrator and actor. One of his continuing assignments was as narrator for NBC's Project 20 public affairs specials. He narrated a ninety-minute condensation of the television series, Victory at Sea, for Project 20 in 1954. Other Project 20 assignments were in regard to the atomic bomb, and three religious documentaries using great paintings to tell the Bible story: The Coming of Christ (at Christmas); He Is Risen (at Easter); and The Law and Prophets of the Old Testament. Audio from The Coming of Christ, with orchestrations by Robert Russell Bennett, was released by Decca Records in 1960 to popular acclaim.

In 1965, he narrated the Youngstown Sheet and Tube sponsored films, Search. The film won a CINE (Council on International Nontheatrical Events) Golden Eagle Award in 1964. It was selected for entry into international film festivals in Venice and Edinburgh.

Scourby replaced Sean Connery as narrator of the television special The Incredible World of James Bond, originally broadcast by NBC in 1965. He narrated the 1965 United States Navy documentary Pacific Frontier.

As a television actor, Scourby had roles on Playhouse 90, Circle Theatre, and Studio One. He refused to tie himself down to a series, because, as he explained, "it's hard to do good things that way." He took occasional parts in westerns such as Wanted: Dead or Alive, Bonanza, and The Rifleman, as well as Mr. Novak, Daniel Boone, The Asphalt Jungle, The Man from U.N.C.L.E., The Defenders, and other set-format dramatic shows. Most of the filmed shows were produced in California. In 1972, he joined his wife, Lori March, on The Secret Storm, on which he played the second Dr. Ian Northcoate (March played his wife, Valerie Lake Ames Northcoate), until that show was cancelled in 1974. He later played Nigel Fargate on All My Children In the Twilight Zone episode, "The Last Flight", he played General Harper.

In character as James Bond, Scourby narrated the controversial television re-edit of the 1969 Bond film On Her Majesty's Secret Service broadcast by ABC in two parts in February 1976.

== Audio recordings ==
Scourby read 422 books for the Talking Books program of the American Foundation for the Blind, including Homer's Iliad, Tolstoy's War and Peace, Joyce's Ulysses, Faulkner's The Sound and the Fury. Scourby considered Talking Books his most important work. He also made recordings for Spoken Arts and Listening Library.

=== King James Bible ===
Scourby was the first person to record the King James Bible issued on long-play records in the 1950s. He originally narrated the Old and New Testament for the American Foundation for the Blind. The project required more than four years before it was completed in 1953. The original goal was to produce a clean, clear recording for visually impaired listeners. The American Bible Society distributed the recordings as The Talking Bible, a set of 169 LP records with a running time of 84.5 hours.

=== Poetry recordings ===
Scourby made recordings of British and American poetry, including A Golden Treasury of Poetry, an LP recorded for the children's label Golden Records. It featured readings of such poems as Paul Revere's Ride, Gunga Din, The Highwayman, The Owl and the Pussycat, and Annabel Lee, and commentary written by Louis Untermeyer.

== Personal life and death ==
Scourby and Lori von Eltz were married on May 12, 1943. Von Eltz was the daughter of motion-picture actor Theodor von Eltz, and was well known as the actress Lori March. The couple had a daughter, Alexandra, born on March 27, 1944.

Scourby had no political affiliation nor any specific religious affiliations, though he was baptized in the Greek Orthodox tradition and his marriage to von Eltz occurred in an Episcopal chapel.

Scourby died of a heart attack on February 22, 1985, in Newtown, Connecticut, aged 71. His widow died in 2013, aged 90.

== Filmography ==
- With These Hands (1950) – Doctor (uncredited)
- Affair in Trinidad (1952) – Max Fabian
- Because of You (1952) – Dr. Breen
- The Redhead from Wyoming (1953) – Reece Duncan
- The Glory Brigade (1953) – Lieutenant Niklas
- The Big Heat (1953) – Mike Lagana
- Sign of the Pagan (1954) – Chrysaphius
- The Silver Chalice (1954) – Luke
- Ransom! (1956) – Dr. Paul Y. Gorman
- Studio One
  - "Emmaline" (1956) - Edward
  - "A Special Announcement" (1956) - Narrator
  - "A Walk in the Forest" (1957) - Prof. Tom Monev
  - "The Night America Trembled" (1957) - Carl Phillips
- Giant (1956) – Old Polo
- Me and the Colonel (1958) – Major Von Bergen
- The Shaggy Dog (1959) – Dr. Mikhail Andrassy
- The Big Fisherman (1959) – David Ben-Zadok
- Alfred Hitchcock Presents (1960) (Season 6 Episode 10: "Sybilla") - Horace Meade
- Seven Thieves (1960) – Raymond Le May
- Man on a String (1960) – Colonel Vadja Kubelov
- The Devil at 4 O'Clock (1961) – The Governor
- Gendarme in New York (1965)
- Ready on Arrival, the USS Independence in Vietnam (1966)
- Year 1999 A.D. (1967) – Narrator
- America In Space - The First Decade (1968) – Narrator (voice)
- The Executioner (1970) – Professor Parker
- Jesus (1979) – Narrator (voice), Luke (voice)
- Strange But True (1981)
- Merton (1984) – Narrator (voice)
- The Stuff (1985) – Evans (final film role)
