= Fortunate 400 =

IRS list of richest Americans

The Fortunate 400 is a list of the top four hundred people in the United States according to their adjusted gross income. The IRS has published data of the top 400 tax returns since 1992. The data are used to analyze trends in income distribution.

In 1992, when the IRS started tracking the people who made the most money, the 400th person on the list made $24 million. Then In 2007, the 400th person reported an adjusted gross income of $138 million (or $87 million, inflation-adjusted). The increase mostly came from capital gains. The analysis of the data informs the discussion about taxation.
