= Paradise Bay =

Paradise Bay may refer to:

- Paradise Bay (TV series)
- Paradise Harbour, Antarctica
- Paradise Bay, bay on Malta
