= Three Steps to Heaven =

Three Steps to Heaven may refer to:

- Three Steps to Heaven (TV series), a 1950s TV series
- "Three Steps to Heaven" (song), a song by Eddie Cochran, later covered by Showaddywaddy
