= Conard Fowkes =

American actor (1933–2009)

Fowkes in Dark Shadows

Conard Fowkes (January 4, 1933 in Washington, D.C. – December 14, 2009 in New York City) was an American actor. He was best known for acting in soap operas, including Kitty Foyle, Dark Shadows, The Edge of Night, The Secret Storm, Hidden Faces, Search for Tomorrow, A Flame in the Wind, and As the World Turns.

He also appeared in feature films, including:

- 1968: What's So Bad About Feeling Good? as Board Member (uncredited)
- 1973: Serpico as Cop in Narcotics Raid (uncredited)
- 1974: Lovin' Molly as Eddie White
- 1981: Prince of the City as Agent Elroy Pendleton
- 1989: Family Business as 'Caper' Detective (final film role)

In addition to his work in film and television, Fowkes did some stage acting. He performed in Jean-Claude van Itallie's America Hurrah during the 1960s at the Pocket Theater in Manhattan. He also performed in Julie Bovasso's Standard Safety and The Nothing Kid at La MaMa Experimental Theatre Club in 1974, then in Bovasso's Schubert's Last Serenade, The Final Analysis, and The Super Lover at La MaMa in 1975.

Fowkes was elected to Equity's Council in 1973, and served as the Actors' Equity Association's secretary and treasurer from 1988 to 2009. In 1977, he co-founded VITA, AEA's Volunteer Income Tax Assistance program. The program has assisted thousands of AEA members with their income taxes. Fowkes's advocacy also contributed to the Qualified Performing Artist Deduction in the Federal Tax Code in 1986.
