= Lori March =

American actress

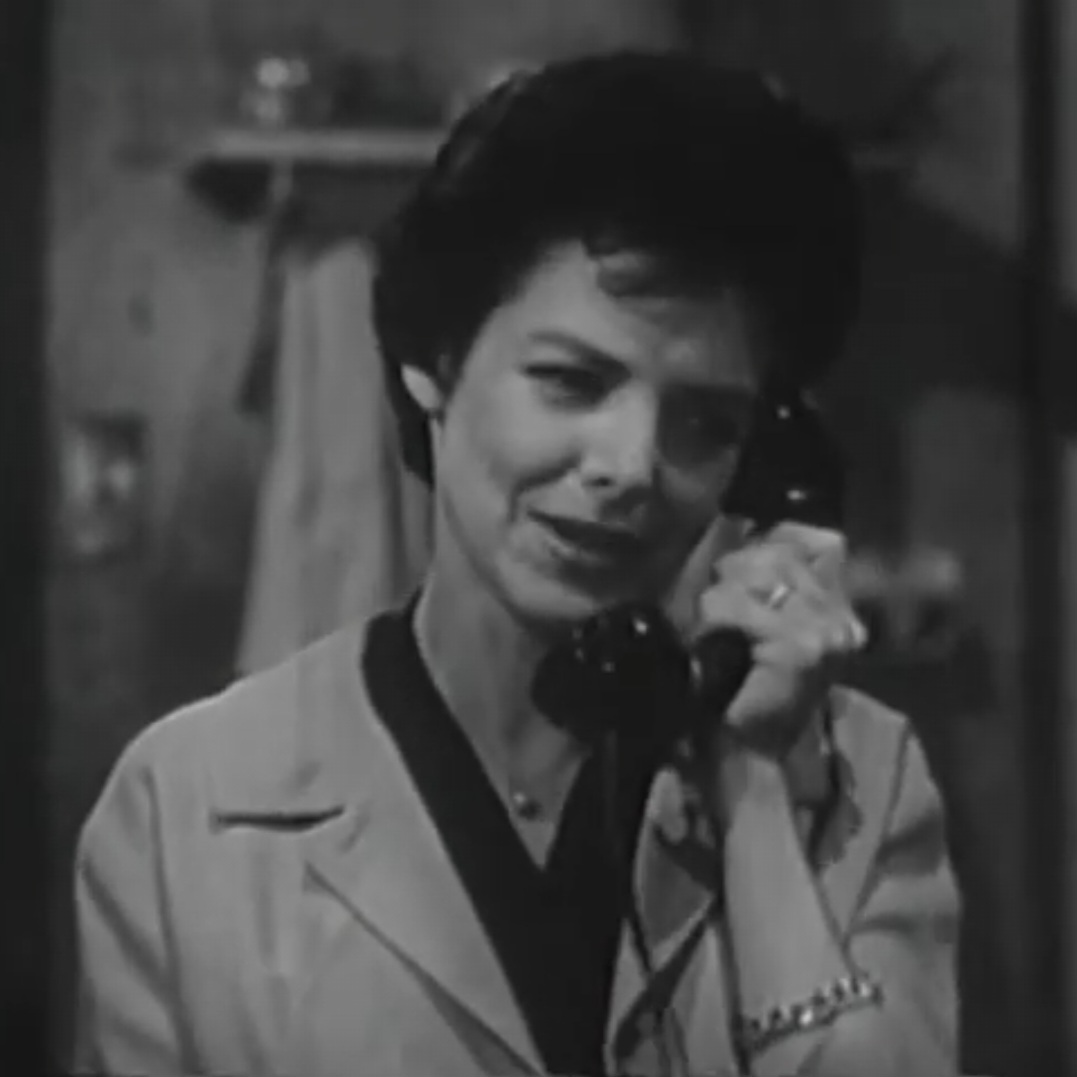
- March in an episode of One Step Beyond (1959)
- Born: Lori von Eltz; March 6, 1923; Los Angeles County, California, U.S.
- Died: March 19, 2013 (aged 90); Redding, Connecticut, U.S.
- Resting place: Church of the Transfiguration
- Occupation: Actress
- Years active: 1949-1982
- Spouse(s): Alexander Scourby (1943–1985) (his death) (1 child); Howard Taubman (1988–1996) (his death); Milton L. Williams (1997–2008) (his death)
- Parent(s): Theodore von Eltz and Peggy Prior; Joseph Moncure March (adoptive father)

Lori March (March 6, 1923 – March 19, 2013) was an American television actress. She was best known for her roles on daytime soap operas. She was dubbed 'First Lady of Daytime Television'.

== Early years ==
March was born in Hollywood, California. She was the daughter of Theodore von Eltz, an actor, and Peggy Prior, a screenwriter. Poet Joseph Moncure March was her adoptive father. She attended Beverly Hills High School. She studied theatre at HB Studio in New York City.

== Stage ==
March's Broadway credits include Giants, Sons of Giants (1961), The Chalk Garden (1955), and Charley's Aunt (1953).

== Television ==
March played Lenore Bradley on the soap opera The Brighter Day. Her other soap operas and roles included Three Steps to Heaven (Jennifer), As the World Turns (Nurse Harris), The Secret Storm (Valerie Hill Ames Northcoate), One Life to Live (Adele Huddleston), The Edge of Night (Mrs. Hinson), Texas (Mildred Canfield), Another Life (Barbara Gilbert), The Guiding Light (Lady Agnes Gilmore), and Another World (Abigail Kramer). She appeared in 6 Perry Mason episodes including the role of defendant Paula Wallace in "The Case of the Wary Wildcatter" (1960), defendant Edna Culross in "The Case of the Posthumous Painter" (1961), murderer Olive Omstead in "The Case of the Capricious Corpse" (1962), and murderer Madame Zillia in "The Case of the Garulous Go-Between" (1964).

== Personal life ==
In May 1943, March married actor Alexander Scourby.

== Death ==
On March 19, 2013, March died at age 90 while sleeping in Redding, Connecticut.

== Selected television credits ==
- Man Against Crime (1953) (Season 4 Episode 37: "Black Leg-White Tie") as Margaret
- Three Steps to Heaven (1953–1954) (380 episodes) as Jennifer Alden
- The Brighter Day (1956–1958) as Lenore Bradley
- Alfred Hitchcock Presents (1958) (Season 4 Episode 5: "The $2,000,000 Defense") as Eve Ashley
- Perry Mason (1958–1964) (5 episodes) as Helen Lessing / Paula Wallace / Edna Culross / Olive Omstead / Madame Zillia
- The Twilight Zone (1960) (Season 1 Episode 14: "Third from the Sun") as Eve Sturka
- Dr. Kildare (1963) (Season 3 Episode 11: "The Backslider") as Ruth Keening
- The Secret Storm (1964–1974) (22 episodes) as Valerie Ames / Valerie Ames Northcote
- One Life to Live (1979) (2 episodes) as Adele Huddleston
- The Edge of Night (1980) (5 episodes) as Mrs. Henson
- Texas (1982) (26 episodes) as Mildred Canfield

== Film credits ==
- Ransom! (1956) as Elizabeth Stannard
- Lovers and Lollipops (1956) as Ann
