= Jayne Bentzen =

American actress and philanthropist (born 1951)

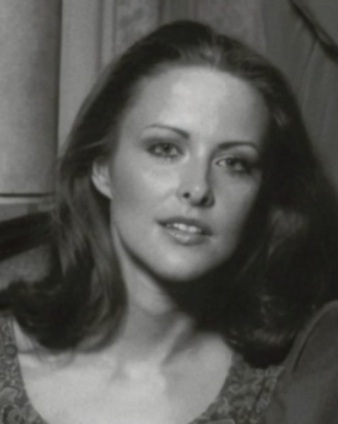
- Betzen in The Edge of Night, 1978
- Born: August 15, 1951 (age 75); Evansville, Indiana, US
- Occupations: Actress, Philanthropist
- Known for: The Edge of Night; A Breed Apart; Blood Rage
- Spouse: Benedict Silverman (m. 1989)

Jayne Bentzen (born August 15, 1951, in Evansville, Indiana) is an American actress, model, and philanthropist. As an actress, she is best known for her portrayal of Nicole Drake Cavanaugh on the CBS/ABC daytime show The Edge of Night (1978–1981). Bentzen is also the founder and head of the Bentzen Silverman Foundation, a charitable organization dedicated to implementing science-based reading instruction in public schools.

== Early life ==
Bentzen was born in Evansville, Indiana, as the youngest child of Irvin and Marigail Bentzen.Her father was a lieutenant colonel in the Indiana National Guard and a personnel manager with the Chrysler corporation. Her mother was a schoolteacher. During Bentzen's childhood, her family relocated to Ohio and later to Michigan.

== Acting career ==
From an early age, Bentzen performed in local theater productions of Anne Frank, The Glass Menagerie, and The School for Scandal. She attended the Interlochen Arts Academy in Michigan and apprenticed in summer stock. Upon graduating high school, Bentzen moved to Los Angeles, where she studied acting with Lee Strasberg. During this period, she also worked as a model, appearing in advertising campaigns, magazine spreads, and television commercials. She was represented by the Nina Blanchard Agency in Los Angeles, Ford Models in New York, and Pauline's in Paris.

In 1974, Bentzen moved to New York City, where she performed in numerous theater productions, including Who’s Afraid of Virginia Woolf?, The School for Scandal, and A Hatful of Rain. In 1978 Bentzen was cast as Nicole Travis Drake Cavanaugh in the crime-mystery melodrama The Edge of Night. Her portrayal of Nicole, a character coming to terms with the death of her husband, attorney Adam Drake (played by Donald May), who later married Miles Cavanaugh (Joel Crothers), was praised by critics, with one newspaper noting that she “provided viewers with a refreshing interpretation of the role.” Bentzen remained in the role until 1981. Bentzen's other notable roles include Amy Rollings in A Breed Apart (1984), and Julie in Blood Rage (1987).

== Philanthropic work ==
In 2012, Bentzen and her husband, real estate investor and art collector Benedict Silverman, established the Bentzen Silverman Foundation to support evidence-based reading instruction in public elementary schools. Bentzen serves as the foundation's president and board chair. The foundation has long supported what is now widely recognized as the "science of reading," an interdisciplinary field that draws from cognitive science, linguistics, and education to understand how people learn to read and to identify effective methods for reading instruction.

At the time the foundation was established, many school systems across the United States were using instructional approaches rooted in whole language and balanced literacy models. While widely implemented, such approaches have faced scrutiny, particularly regarding their effectiveness for English language learners and students with learning disabilities.

The Bentzen Silverman Foundation's signature program is Reading Go! (formerly Reading Rescue), an early-literacy tutoring and professional development initiative developed by Dr. Nora Hoover at the University of Florida College of Education. The program provides intensive, structured reading interventions for elementary students and offers training to school staff, including paraprofessionals and other non-instructional personnel. Tutoring is delivered one-to-one or in small groups at high frequency (typically three or more times per week), which aligns with research identifying high-impact tutoring as one of the most effective strategies for improving reading outcomes in the early grades. Reading Go! is most often implemented during the school day and in traditional classroom settings, a model shown to enhance both accessibility and effectiveness.

Over the years, the Bentzen Silverman Foundation has steadily scaled its program. In the 2024–2025 academic year, CUNY Reading Fellows—the largest tutoring partner supported by the Bentzen Silverman Foundation—provided 59,864 tutoring sessions to 2,793 striving readers across 66 New York City public schools, delivered by 728 trained CUNY tutors. Several studies and field evaluations have demonstrated the program's effectiveness, including a controlled study led by educational psychologist Linnea Ehri, who found that first-grade students from low-socioeconomic and language-minority backgrounds who received Reading Go! tutoring made statistically significant gains in both word reading and text comprehension compared to students in control groups.

The Bentzen Silverman Foundation's work has contributed to a nationwide shift in reading education policy. As of late 2024, forty U.S. states and the District of Columbia have passed laws or adopted policies aligned with the "science of reading" framework.

Until 2022, Reading Go! was delivered through The Literacy Trust, a New York-based nonprofit organization. Since 2023, Reading Go! has been delivered through The Reading Institute.

== Filmography ==
Television
Year	Title	Role
1978–81	The Edge of Night	Nicole Travis Cavanaugh

Film
Year	Title	Role
1984	A Breed Apart	Amy Rollings
1987	Blood Rage	Julie
