= All That Glitters (American TV series) =

US sitcom

- Screen shot from promotional ad for the series, from Chicago station WFLD
- Genre: Sitcom; Soap opera parody
- Created by: Norman Lear
- Directed by: James Frawley; Herbert Kenwith
- Theme music composer: Alan and Marilyn Bergman
- Opening theme: "Genesis Revisited" performed by Kenny Rankin
- Composers: Ray Brown; Bobby Knight; Shelly Manne
- Country of origin: United States
- Original language: English
- No. of seasons: 1
- No. of episodes: 65

Production
- Executive producer: Norman Lear
- Producers: Norman Lear; Stephanie Sills
- Camera setup: Multi-camera
- Running time: 25 mins.
- Production company: T.A.T. Communications Company

Original release
- Network: Syndicated
- Release: April 18 – July 15, 1977

All That Glitters is an American sitcom by producer Norman Lear. It consisted of 65 episodes, running five nights a week between April 18 and July 15, 1977, in broadcast syndication. The show, a spoof of the soap opera format, depicted the trials and tribulations of a group of executives at the Globatron corporation. The twist of the series was that it was set within a world of complete role-reversal: Women were the "stronger sex," the executives and breadwinners, while the "weaker sex" – the men – were the support staff or stay-at-home dads. Men were often treated as sex objects.

The series featured Eileen Brennan, Greg Evigan, Lois Nettleton, Gary Sandy, Tim Thomerson and Jessica Walter. Comic actor and cartoon voice artist Chuck McCann was also a regular. Linda Gray played transgender fashion model Linda Murkland, the first transgender series regular on American television. Critically, All That Glitters was negatively received and a ratings disappointment across syndicated television stations.

== Production ==
All That Glitters was series creator Norman Lear's attempt to duplicate his success with the syndicated soap opera spoof Mary Hartman, Mary Hartman. Lear described the premise simply: "God created Eve first, took out her rib and gave her a companion so she wouldn't be lonely." Lear came up with the idea on a trip to Washington, D.C.:

I had visited the Institute of Policy Studies, and I just loved the whole thing. And I thought there was a series in it—a five-times-a-week series: I went to bed thinking about that, and I woke up the next morning thinking what would happen if the male-female equation were changed? What would happen if the women had all the power and all the advantage, and the men had what the women normally would have?

The world of All That Glitters had always been female-dominated, but Lear also used the series to comment on changing sex roles in the United States in the 1970s. Under the working title Womb at the Top, All That Glitters was co-created by longtime soap writer Ann Marcus, with a transgender consultant hired to help Linda Gray develop her character Linda Murkland as well as Eve Merriam, whose off-Broadway show The Club featured women as turn-of-the-century male chauvinists "strutting around in top hats and tails and telling sexist jokes."

Former Major League Baseball player Wes Parker practically walked into his role. He was doing play-by-play reporting for a Los Angeles television station owned by Lear's partner, Jerry Perenchio. "Lear casually asked if I'd be interested in the part. I said yes, but knew it was out of the question, because in real life things don't happen that way. Nobody walks in and gets on a Norman Lear show. I read for the part, got it and didn't sleep at all that night."

Linda Gray was somewhat nonplussed upon being offered the role of transgender Linda Murkland. "I remember meeting Norman and him saying, 'You'll be perfect for the role.' I didn't know whether to take that as a compliment or what." To prepare for her role, Linda Gray asked Lear to arrange for her to meet with a transgender woman. Gray met with her for several hours prior to the beginning of filming and on a couple of occasions during production.

Lois Nettleton reportedly based her characterization of Christina Stockwood on Clark Gable. Production started in early March 1977 with director Herbert Kenwith.

In test screenings prior to its premiere, reaction to the show was sharply divided. According to executive producer Stephanie Sills, the strongest negative reaction came from male executives. "They didn't mind being portrayed by women. It was simply that they detest the way we depicted them." Feminists were uncertain how to react to the series, with some being concerned that audiences would not perceive the show as satire but as an attempt to represent how a female-dominated society would actually operate. Lear marketed the program through his company, TAT Syndication.

== Cast ==
Main cast

- Lois Nettleton as Christina Stockwood, Globatron executive
- Barbara Baxley as L.W. Carruthers, President of Globatron
- Anita Gillette as Nancy Langston, Globatron executive
- Chuck McCann as Bert Stockwood, Christina's husband
- Wes Parker as Glenn Langston, Nancy's husband
- Vanessa Brown as Peggy Horner, Globatron executive
- Louise Shaffer as Andrea Martin, lawyer
- David Haskell as Michael McFarland, Andrea's boyfriend
- Linda Gray as Linda Murkland, a trans woman model
- Gary Sandy as Dan Kincaid, Globatron secretary
- Marte Boyle Slout as Grace Smith, Globatron executive

Supporting characters

- Jessica Walter as Joan Hamlyn, agent
- Eileen Brennan as Ma Packer
- Tim Thomerson as Sonny Packer
- Jim Greenleaf as Jeremy Stockwood, Christina's son
- Marilyn Sokol as Farrah Abuban
- Danny DeVito as Baba, Farrah's concubine

== Critical reaction ==
All That Glitters debuted the week of April 18, 1977, on about 40 stations in late-night syndication. It was poorly critically received, with one reviewer going so far as to call the show's theme song "blasphemous" for suggesting that God was female and created Eve first. Time magazine sharply criticized the series, calling it "embarrassingly amateurish", with "flaccid" and "wearying" jokes, flat writing, "mediocre" acting and "aimless" direction. The Wall Street Journal concurred, saying that while the series' role-reversal premise may have been adequate for a play or film, it was too limiting to serve as the basis for a continuing series. These limitations showed up most clearly, the Journal says, in the lead performances. Although praising the performers themselves as talented, they are cited for being "unable to infuse much life into their roles". The Journal pegs the fundamental problem with All That Glitters as that "its characters are not people at all, merely composites of the least attractive characteristics of each sex. The satire focuses not on the way real, recognizable people behave, but on stereotypes and cliches about masculine and feminine attitudes. Even when stood on their heads, they still remain stereotypes and cliches."

New Times magazine was much more receptive to the series. Although labeling it "unquestionably the weirdest [show] that Lear has ever produced", New Times found that the series was not "a satire of mannerisms but of attitudes". All That Glitters required that viewers watch closely to pick up on the subtleties and nuances, "not so much for what the show says, but for the way that it's said".

All That Glitters, after initially capturing 20% of viewers in major markets in its opening weeks, had lost about half of that audience midway through its run. The series was cancelled after 13 weeks, last airing on July 15, 1977. Although the show was panned, it and Lear, along with Mary Hartman, Mary Hartman, are credited with expanding the subject matter that television producers were able to explore with lessened fear of antagonizing sponsors or viewers.

In the years since the series, it has garnered something of a positive reputation, with one critic listing it and other Lear efforts as "imaginative shows that contained some of the most striking satires of television and American society ever broadcast".

While the show itself was unsuccessful, it did spawn a hit song. "You Don't Bring Me Flowers", which had been written with the intention of its being the theme song, was recorded by Neil Diamond and Barbra Streisand and made it to #1 on the Billboard Hot 100. By the time the show made it to air, another song had been chosen as the theme. The replacement, "Genesis Revisited", was later described by The New York Times as "sparkl[ing] with witty rhymes and a punchy good humor". The song was performed by Kenny Rankin. The lyrics for both songs were written by Alan and Marilyn Bergman (the music for "Genesis Revisited" is credited solely to Alan Bergman).
