= Paradise Bay (TV series) =

American television series

- Genre: Drama
- Created by: Ted Corday
- Written by: Irving Vendig
- Story by: Murder
- Directed by: Dick Darley
- Starring: Marion Ross; Heather North; Keith Andes; K. T. Stevens; Walter Brooke
- Country of origin: United States
- Original language: English
- No. of seasons: 1
- No. of episodes: Unknown

Production
- Executive producer: Ted Corday
- Producer: Oliver Barbour

Original release
- Release: September 27, 1965 – July 1, 1966

Paradise Bay is an American serial that aired on NBC Daytime from September 27, 1965, to July 1, 1966. The show was created by Ted Corday who later created the serial Days of Our Lives.

The show aired in the morning at 11:30 a.m.; it was paired with Morning Star which aired before it and also was created by Corday. Paradise Bay and Morning Star premiered on the same day, and were cancelled on the same day.

Paradise Bay was one of the first soap operas to air in color. Among the writers was Irving Vendig who had written Search for Tomorrow, Three Steps to Heaven, The Edge of Night, and The Clear Horizon.

== Cast ==
The following actors were among those who appeared on the program.

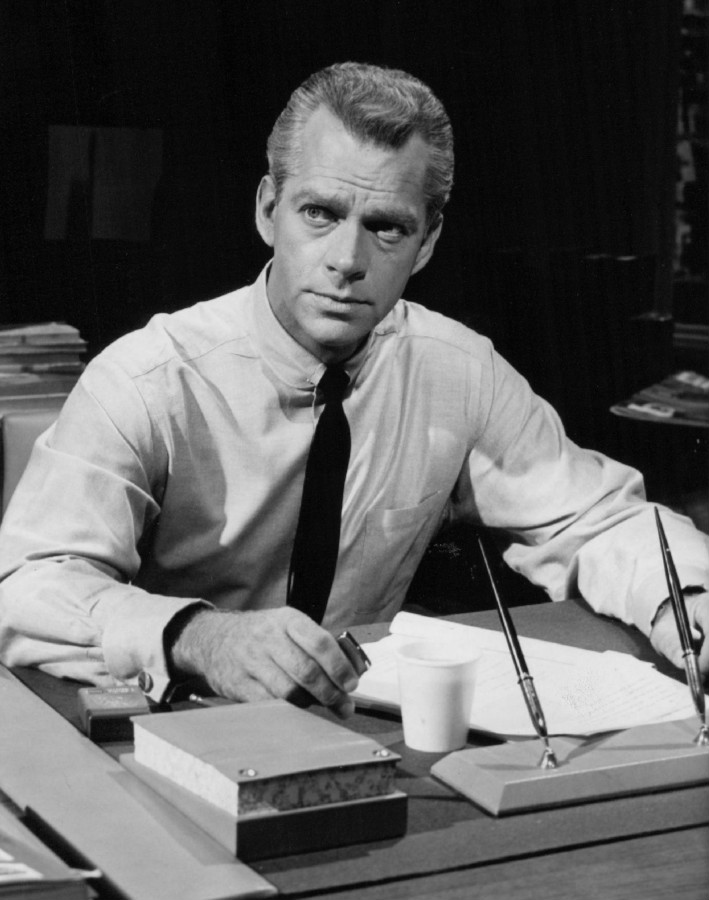
Keith Andes as Jeff Morgan.

- Marion Ross as Mary Morgan
- Heather North as Kitty Morgan
- Keith Andes as Jeff Morgan
- K. T. Stevens as Estelle Kimball
- Walter Brooke as Walter Montgomery

== Ratings ==
See List of American daytime soap opera ratings

1965–1966 season

- 1. As the World Turns 13.9
- 2. The Guiding Light 11.2
- 3. Search For Tomorrow 11.0
- 4. The Secret Storm 10.9
- 13. Paradise Bay 4.1 (Debut)

== Storylines ==
The main storyline during the series' run was a murder. The body of a murdered girl washed up on shore during the first episode. Other storylines included the goings on at a local radio station, run by Jeff Morgan (Keith Andes), who was married to Mary Morgan (Marion Ross). Their daughter, Kitty, was played by Heather North, and the story of a local band run by the teens. Paradise Bay used contemporary music, and was one of the first soap operas to do so.

Marion Ross (Mary Morgan) would later become best known for her long-running role of Marion Cunningham on the long-running situation comedy, Happy Days.
