= A Breed Apart (1984 film) =

- Spanish film poster
- Directed by: Philippe Mora
- Written by: Paul Wheeler
- Starring: Kathleen Turner; Rutger Hauer; Powers Boothe; Donald Pleasence
- Cinematography: Geoffrey Stephenson
- Edited by: Chris Lebenzon
- Music by: Maurice Gibb
- Distributed by: Hemdale Film Corporation
- Release date: June 1984
- Running time: 95 minutes
- Country: United States
- Language: English
- Budget: $3,000,000 (estimated)

A Breed Apart is a 1984 American drama film directed by Philippe Mora. It stars Kathleen Turner, Rutger Hauer and Powers Boothe.

The screenplay by Paul Wheeler concerns the need to protect endangered species, in this case the bald eagle.

== Plot ==
Obsessive bird egg collector J.P. Whittier is determined to obtain the eggs of a newly discovered species of bald eagle nesting high up on the private island of reclusive Vietnam veteran Jim Malden. Whittier hires mountaineer Mike Walker to pose as a photographer and win Malden's confidence in order to gain access to the eggs. Subplots include locals seeking revenge on Malden after being caught hunting on his island without permission and Malden's inability to express his affection for local store owner Stella Clayton and her son Adam. At Walker's suggestion, Malden visits Stella to tell her how he truly feels. Walker uses the opportunity to scale the mountain where the eggs lie, only to fall victim to his conscience when his goal is within his grasp. Malden, Stella, and Adam are united at the end, while Walker provides a local reporter with a scoop about Whittier's illegal hobby.

== Cast ==
- Rutger Hauer as Jim Malden
- Powers Boothe as Mike Walker
- Kathleen Turner as Stella Clayton
- Donald Pleasence as J.P. Whittier
- Andy Fenwick as Adam Clayton
- Brion James as Peyton
- John Dennis Johnston as Miller
- Jayne Bentzen as Amy Rollings

== Production ==
At the time the film was made, the bald eagle was on the brink of extirpation in the continental United States. The bird now has a stable population and was removed from the federal government's list of endangered species in June 2007.

The film was shot on location in Asheville, Biltmore Estate, Chimney Rock State Park, and Lake Lure in North Carolina. After principal filming had finished, the film reels were sent back by plane to Los Angeles. One reel (of 4) never arrived, so the film was substantially reorganized around the missing scenes (shot out of order) in editing. This partly explains why some sub-plots are incomplete and Jim Malden (Rutger Hauer) has no back story.

=== Principal production credits ===
- Producers ..... John Daly, Derek Gibson
- Original Music ..... Maurice Gibb
- Cinematography ..... Geoffrey Stephenson
- Production Design ..... William Barclay
- Art Direction ..... Jeff Ginn
- Set Decoration ..... Ed Sears
- Costume Design ..... John Boxer
- Film Editor ..... Chris Lebenzon

== Critical reception ==
Variety said the film "lacks reason, dramatic tension or emotional involvement."
