= Hidden Faces (American TV series) =

- Genre: Soap opera
- Created by: Irving Vendig
- Starring: Conard Fowkes; Louise Shaffer; Tony Lo Bianco; Stephen Joyce; Linda Blair; Gretchen Walther
- Country of origin: United States
- No. of episodes: 127

Production
- Producer: Charles Fisher
- Running time: 30 minutes

Original release
- Network: NBC
- Release: December 30, 1968 – June 27, 1969

Hidden Faces is an American soap opera that aired on NBC from December 30, 1968 to June 27, 1969. The series was created by Irving Vendig, who also created the serial The Edge of Night. The serial focused on a law firm that was dealing with a high profile murder case throughout its 127-episode run; the main romantic angle had the firm's senior partner, Arthur Adams, becoming involved with client Kate Logan, a female surgeon accused of murder, which Adams and partner Nick Turner acquitted her of. Charles Fisher was the producer of the program, which was an in-house NBC production.

The show was a production of NBC, and was the only NBC-owned soap opera at the time. (The network was later to own How to Survive a Marriage and to purchase The Doctors from that show's sponsor, Colgate-Palmolive.)

The show's leading stars were Conard Fowkes as Adams, Gretchen Walther as Logan, and Tony Lo Bianco as Turner. Others in the cast included Linda Blair, Robin Braxton, Ludi Claire, Betsy Durkin, Joseph Daly, Rita Gam, Lloyd Hollar, Stephen Joyce, John Karlen, Nat Polen, Roy Scheider, and Louise Shaffer.

== Broadcast history ==
Hidden Faces replaced Let's Make a Deal at 1:30 p. m. (12:30 Central) after disputes between NBC and Let's Make a Deal packagers Stefan Hatos and Monty Hall caused the game/participation show to move to ABC. Facing the ABC Let's Make a Deal and CBS' As the World Turns, Hidden Faces performed poorly and, in an unusual move for daytime serials in that era, was cancelled after only six months in favor of the Bill Leyden-hosted game You're Putting Me On. With almost all of the fans of Let's Make a Deal's following their show to ABC, Hidden Faces could not get a foothold among viewers, since soap opera fans instinctively preferred the then-top-rated As the World Turns. Hidden Faces was the first of eight programs that NBC put in the timeslot of Let's Make a Deal between its departure and the expansion of Days of Our Lives to an hour on April 21, 1975. Of those eight shows, only Three on a Match lasted longer than a year.

An episode of this program may exist, due to a scene being uploaded to YouTube in Feb. 2023, although most tapes of the series were erased by NBC, per the standard practices of that time.
