= Above-the-line deduction =

Type of tax deductions in the United States of America

In the United States tax law, an above-the-line deduction is a deduction that the Internal Revenue Service allows a taxpayer to subtract from his or her gross income in arriving at "adjusted gross income" for the taxable year. These deductions are set forth in Internal Revenue Code Section 62. A taxpayer's gross income minus his or her above-the-line deductions is equal to the adjusted gross income. Because these deductions are taken before adjusted gross income is calculated, they are designated "above-the-line". Thus, those deductions allowed in computing "taxable income" under section 63 of the IRC are "below-the-line deductions" (thus, adjusted gross income represents "the line"). Above-the-line deductions may be more valuable to high-income taxpayers than below-the-line deductions. Since tax year 2018, above-the-line deductions are reported on Schedule 1 of IRS Form 1040.

== Impact ==
Above-the-line deductions are generally more advantageous for a high income taxpayer than so-called below-the-line deductions. Below-the-line deductions are subtracted from a taxpayer's adjusted gross income. Above-the-line deductions may also be subject to income-sensitive phaseouts or limitations, e.g., MAGI limits on the tuition and fees deduction. Certain below the line deductions are also phased out for high income taxpayers pursuant to Internal Revenue Code Section 68. Medical and dental expenses are below the line deductions pursuant to Internal Revenue Code Section 67. These expenses may only be deducted, however, to the extent they exceed 10% (7.5 % for 65 and over) of a taxpayer's AGI. Accordingly, a taxpayer would only be entitled to deduct the amount by which these expenses exceed 10% of $100,000, or $10,000 with an adjusted gross income of $100,000 and medical expenses of $11,000. Because these expenses exceed $10,000 by $1,000, the taxpayer is only entitled to a $1,000 deduction. Above-the-line deductions are also preferred because they can be taken by all taxpayers regardless of whether they take standard or itemized deductions. Moreover, they are desirable because they reduce adjusted gross income (AGI). Generally, the smaller the AGI, the greater the percentage of deductibility of itemized deductions.

== List of the above-the-line deductions ==
Internal Revenue Code Section 62(a)(1) allows above-the-line deductions for most ordinary and necessary business expenses which are attributable to a trade or business carried on by the taxpayer, if such trade or business does not consist of the performance of services by the taxpayer as an employee. I.R.C. 162(a). This includes reasonable allowance for salaries or other compensation for personal services rendered, traveling expenses (including amounts expended for meals and lodging other than amounts which are lavish or extravagant under the circumstances) while away from home in the pursuit of a trade or business; and rentals or other payments required to be made as a condition to the continued use or possession, for purposes of the trade or business, of property to which the taxpayer has not taken or is not taking title or in which he has no equity.

Internal Revenue Code Sections 62 states that the following items are allowable as above-the-line deductions:

- Contribution to Traditional IRA
- Certain expenses of performing artists
- Certain expenses of state officials (162)
- Certain expenses for books and supplies incurred by teachers (162)
- Certain expenses for Reserve Component members
- Certain deductions of life tenants and income beneficiaries of property
- Retirement plan savings for the self-employed (219)
- Penalties forfeited because of premature withdrawal of funds
- Alimony payments (215; however not deductible from 2019–2025 pursuant to the Tax Cuts and Jobs Act)
- Reforestation expenses
- Required repayments of supplemental unemployment compensation
- Jury duty pay given to the employer
- Clean fuel vehicles (for tax years 2003–2006)
- Moving expenses for members of the armed forces (217)
- Archer Medical Savings Accounts
- Interest on student loans (221)
- Higher Education expenses (222)
- Health savings accounts (223)
- Costs involving discrimination suits
- One-half of self-employment tax

See also IRS Publication 17.

== Formulas ==
- Adjusted gross income (AGI) = Gross Income IRC (61)(a) − Above-the-line Deductions (62)(a)
- Taxable income = AGI − Standard Deduction 63(c) or Itemized Deductions 63(d)
