= Ted Corday =

TV producer and director

- Ted and Betty Corday in the 1940s
- Born: Theodore Corday; May 8, 1908; Winnipeg, Manitoba, Canada
- Died: July 23, 1966 (aged 58); Los Angeles, California
- Education: University of Alberta
- Occupations: producer, director, and creator (or co-creator)
- Years active: 1952–1966
- Known for: Creator of Days of Our Lives
- Spouse: Elizabeth "Betty" Shay (m. 1942)
- Children: Kenneth "Ken" Corday Christopher "Chris" Corday

Theodore "Ted" Corday (May 8, 1908 – July 23, 1966) was a Canadian-American producer, director and co-creator of soap opera for NBC, most notably the hit series Days of Our Lives.

== Biography ==
Born in Winnipeg, Manitoba, Corday graduated from the University of Alberta in 1930 and studied law before moving to the United States in 1934. He served as a Captain in the United States Army.

He worked in Broadway for many years before producing dramas for radio, such as Tortilla Flat, Tobacco Road, Gangbusters and Counterspy. He then moved to television in the 1950s, producing Guiding Light for a time as well as directing As the World Turns, from its 1956 premiere until 1965.

Corday was later lured to NBC to create three new soap operas. The first two, Paradise Bay and Morning Star, were not successful, but his third NBC serial, Days of Our Lives, was a success, and remains on the air as of 2024.

== Death ==
Before Corday could pen many stories for the serial, he was diagnosed with cancer, and was admitted to Cedars-Sinai Medical Center. After many months in the hospital, he died on July 23, 1966, aged 58. His widow, Betty Corday, continued to produce Days of our Lives until her death in 1987.

== Executive Producing Tenure ==
Preceded by none	Executive Producer of As the World Turns; April 2, 1956 – 1965	Succeeded by Mary Harris
Preceded by none	Executive Producer of Morning Star; September 27, 1965 – July 1, 1966	Succeeded by Show canceled
Preceded by none	Executive Producer of Paradise Bay; September 27, 1965 – July 1, 1966	Succeeded by Show canceled
Preceded by none	Executive Producer of Days of Our Lives; November 8, 1965 – August 2, 1966	Succeeded by Betty Corday
