= Louise Shaffer =

American actress (born 1942)

- Born: July 5, 1942 (age 83); Woodbridge, Connecticut, U.S.
- Education: Connecticut College (BA); Yale University (MFA); Juilliard School
- Years active: 1967–present
- Spouses: Toby Tompkins; Roger Crews

Louise Shaffer (born July 5, 1942) is an American actress, script writer, and author.

== Biography ==
Shaffer was born in Woodbridge, Connecticut, where she showed an interest in acting early on in her life. After finishing high school, she attended Connecticut College for Women, then Yale Drama School. Shaffer is a coloratura soprano, and was trained at Juilliard.

== Career ==
=== Actress ===
Throughout her life, Shaffer has appeared in numerous soap operas, including Search for Tomorrow, Hidden Faces (1968–1969), and Where the Heart Is. From 1975 to 1976, she he played split personality Serena Faraday/Josie on The Edge of Night.

From 1977 to 1984, Shaffer played journalism magnate Rae Woodard on Ryan's Hope and then reprised the role for the show's finale in 1989. In the summer of 1987, she was brought onto All My Children, playing Erica's evil stepmother, Goldie Kane. After several years as a script writer on various soaps, she had brief roles on Guiding Light as Lewis oil client Mrs. Humphreys (1993), and a stint as the judge in the Peter Lewis custody battle (1994).

She was nominated for two Daytime Emmy Awards for her portrayal of Rae Woodard on Ryan's Hope; she won the award in 1983. In addition to her daytime roles, Shaffer also had a role on the short-lived Norman Lear serialized sitcom All That Glitters.

=== Author ===
Shaffer began writing for soap operas instead of acting on them. Since the late 1980s, she has written for Ryan's Hope, Loving, General Hospital, and As the World Turns.

In addition to scriptwriting, Shaffer has written numerous books.

== Personal life ==
Shaffer was formerly married to actor Toby Tompkins. She is currently married to Roger Crews, who also wrote for Ryan's Hope and Search for Tomorrow.

== Acting credits ==
List of theatre credits
Opening date	Closing date	Title	Role	Theatre
1964		The Beggar's Opera		Master, New York
February 26, 1966	February 26, 1966	First One Asleep,	Esther	Belasco
September 27, 1967	September 30, 1967	Keep It In The Family	Understudy	Plymouth
July 31, 1973	August 26, 1973	Two Gentlemen of Verona	Julia	Delacorte
March 17, 1976	March 28, 1976	The Boss		Playwrights Horizon
April 25, 1973	June 17, 1973	The Women	Second Hairdresser; Second Model; Cigarette Girl	46th Street

List of film and television credits
Year	Title	Role	Notes
1967	Run For Your Life	Donna Sanders	Episode: "A Very Small Injustice"
1968	Hidden Faces	Martha Logan	
1969– 1973	Where the Heart Is	Allison Hathaway Archer Jessup	Unknown episodes
1975– 1976	The Edge of Night	Josie/Serena Faraday	Unknown episodes
1977	Kojak	Francie Foster	Episode: "Kojak's Day, Parts 1 and 2"
1977	All That Glitters	Andrea Martin	
1977– 1989	Ryan's Hope	Rae Woodard	549 episodes
1980	Quincy, M.E.	Mrs. Davenport	Episode: "Deadly Arena"
1984– 1985	Search for Tomorrow	Stephanie Wilkins Wyatt #2	Episodes: 1.8574 and 1.8669
1987	Matlock	Elinor	Episode: "The Rat Pack"
1987	Police Story: The Freeway Killings	Laura Healey	
1987	All My Children	Goldie Kane	Unknown episodes
1994	Guiding Light	Judge Tillman	

== Writing credits ==
- All My Children (2000–2002)
- As the World Turns (1994–2000)
- General Hospital (1992–1993)
- Loving (1990–1991)
- Another World (1989)
- Ryan's Hope (1987–1989)

== Bibliography ==
- Shaffer, Louise (1995). All My Suspects. Berkley. ISBN 978-0-425-14770-2.
- Shaffer, Louise (1996). Talked to Death. Berkley. ISBN 978-0-425-15407-6.
- Shaffer, Louise (2004). The Three Miss Margarets: A Novel. Ballantine. ISBN 978-0-375-76088-4.
- Shaffer, Louise (2006). The Ladies of Garrison Gardens: A Novel. Ballantine. ISBN 978-0-8129-6883-5.
- Shaffer, Louise (2007). Family Acts: A Novel. Ballantine. ISBN 978-1-4000-6063-4.
- Shaffer, Louise (2009). Serendipity: A Novel. Ballantine. ISBN 978-0-345-50209-4.
- Shaffer, Louise (2010). Looking for a Love Story: A Novel. Ballantine. ISBN 978-0-345-50210-0.
