= Qualified Performing Artist Deduction =

Concept in USA tax law

Under United States tax law, certain performing artists are eligible to deduct the expenses incurred in the course of their employment as performing artists ("performing artist expenses"). The deduction itself is provided by IRC § 62(a)(2)(B), while qualifications of a Qualified Performing Artist ("QPA") are provided by IRC § 62(b).

== Benefits of the provision ==
1. This is an "above-the-line" deduction (or "adjustment"), meaning that it reduces a taxpayer's adjusted gross income ("AGI"). Reduced AGI increases eligibility for tax credits and other tax deductions while simultaneously reducing taxable income.
2. Since the passage of the Tax Cuts and Jobs Act in 2017, all miscellaneous itemized deductions, including unreimbursed employee expenses, have been eliminated. As a result, performing artists no longer have the option to deduct their performing artist expenses as unreimbursed employee expenses (one of several miscellaneus itemized deductions). Since 2018, the only way to deduct performing artist expenses is via the QPA provisions of IRC § 62.

== Qualifications for the deduction ==
To be considered a Qualified Performing Artist, a taxpayer must fit certain criteria, as stipulated in IRC § 62(b)(1):

- The taxpayer must have worked as a performing artist in the capacity of an employee (as opposed to an independent contractor) for at least two employers,
- The amount of the expenses attributed to rendering services as a performing artist must exceed ten percent of the taxpayer's gross income that is attributed to the performance of such services, and
- The adjusted gross income of the taxpayer, not counting this deduction, does not exceed $16,000.

In determining whether or not a taxpayer is a Qualified Performing Artist, the two employers stipulated in IRC § 62(b)(1) must each pay wages to the taxpayer in an amount equal to, or greater than, $200. These services must be rendered by the taxpayer, for services in the performing arts, to each respective employer, within a given tax year. As a result, performing artists who are paid less than $200 per year by every employer to whom he or she renders services as an employee in the performing arts are not allowed to take this deduction.

Additionally, any married taxpayer who attempts to claim this deduction must file jointly with her or his spouse, unless they lived apart throughout the entire tax year; additionally, the $16,000 AGI limit applies to the combined AGI of both spouses.

== Deduction amount ==
The amount of the QPA deduction is defined in IRC § 62(a)(2)(B) as "The deductions allowed by section 162 which consist of expenses paid or incurred by a qualified performing artist in connection with the performances by him of services in the performing arts as an employee."

IRC § 162(a) allows for "all the ordinary and necessary expenses paid or incurred during the taxable year in carrying on any trade or business." Typically, "trade or business" deductions are only allowed in situations where the taxpayer carrying on such trade or business is not redering services as an employee, IRC § 62(a)(2), however, specifies circumstances under which certain employees can deduct "trade or business" expenses. Qualified Performing Artists, along with other designated categories of employees (e.g., fee-based government officials, members of the U.S. Military Reserves) meet these specifications.

A QPA may deduct from her or his AGI all "ordinary and necessary expenses." The term "ordinary and necessary" in IRC § 162(a) has been litigated by numerous claimants over the last century, although not necessarily in the context of a Qualified Performing Artist. According to the Taxpayer Advocate Service ("TAS"), there were 106 federal court cases between June 1, 2017, and May 31, 2018, in which the term "ordinary and necessary" was part of claimants' suits against the IRS. In its publication 535, the IRS defines an "ordinary expense" as "one that is common and accepted in your industry," and a "necessary expense" as "one that is helpful and appropriate for your trade or business." In addition, according to the TAS, courts have consistently held that "the amount of the expense must be reasonable."

Those ordinary and necessary expenses QPA's can expect to deduct include: supplies, insurance (other than health), travel expenses, depreciation, car expenses, equipment rentals, etc. These are nearly all the same expenses self-employed individuals deduct as a sole-proprietor on their Schedule C's. It is important to remember, however, that those expenses can only be included as a QPA deduction to the extent that they are attributable to your work as an employee rendering services in the performing arts. Should these expenses also be attributable to personal use or to use as an independent contractor, the expense amounts need to be prorated and attributed accordingly to those different categories.

Incorrectly attributing expenses can result in an underpayment of tax, which can result in penalties and interest being levied upon a taxpayer by the IRS and/or state tax agencies. Consultation with a tax professional may be necessary in this regard.

== Attempts to reform ==
QPA provisions were incorporated into the IRC via passage of the Tax Reform Act of 1986. The $16,000 AGI cap was never indexed to inflation, and has not been raised statutorily since inception. Consequently, very few performing artists now qualify for the deduction due to inflation. The deduction was intended for performers who incur significant expenses and who have the difficulty of spreading deductions over schedule C and schedule A.

=== Early attempts ===
On September 14, 2006, Senators Charles Schumer (D) of NY and Dianne Feinstein (D) of California introduced a bill, S. 3893 to amend the IRC of 1986 to increase the AGI limit for the QPA deduction. This bill would:

- Increase the AGI limit from $16,000 to $30,000.
- Index the limit to inflation for tax years subsequent to 2011.

The bill was referred to the Senate Finance Committee, received no additional co-sponsors, and did not advance to the Senate floor for consideration.

On June 12, 2008, the same Senators introduced a similar bill, S. 3120, with a similarly nondescript title, that would:

- Increase the AGI limit from $16,000 to $30,000.
- Allow each spouse to consider only half of their combined AGI subject to the AGI limit.
- Index the limit to inflation for tax years subsequent to 2008.

The bill was referred to the Senate Finance Committee, received no additional co-sponsors, and did not advance to the Senate floor for consideration.

=== Performing Artist Tax Parity Act ===
U.S. Representatives Judy Chu (D) of California and Vern Buchanan (R) of Florida introduced H.R. 3121, on June 5, 2019, entitled "Performing Artist Tax Parity Act of 2019" as an effort to address the increasingly restrictive AGI cap and marriage penalty imposed by the original provisions of the QPA deduction. The proposed legislation would:

- Increase the AGI limit from $16,000 to $100,000.
- Increase the AGI limit to $200,000 for married couples filing jointly.
- Introduce a phaseout range of $20,000 above the AGI limit. The phaseout would reduce the amount of the deduction by 10% for each $2,000 (or fraction thereof) the taxpayer's AGI exceeds the AGI limit. In other words, a partial deduction would be allowed up to AGI's of $120,000 ($220,000 for married couples).
- Index the limits to inflation for tax years subsequent to 2019.
- Explicitly enumerate a performing artist's agent fees as an expense includable in section 162 expenses.

The bill was referred to the House Ways and Means Committee upon its introduction, gained 28 additional co-sponsors, but was not advanced beyond the committee before the end of the 116th Congress.

On July 28, 2021, U.S. Reps. Chu and Buchanan introduced H.R. 4750 in the 117th Congress, with exactly the same language as H.R. 3121 (116th Congress), entitled "Performing Artist Tax Parity Act of 2021." It was again referred to the House Ways and Means Committee; this time garnering co-sponsorship from 91 other Representatives, but again left unadvanced before the end of the congressional session.

Senators Mark Warner (D) of Virginia and Bill Hagerty (R) of Tennessee introduced a similar bill, S. 2872, in the U.S. Senate on September 28, 2021. The only notable difference between the House and Senate versions of the bill are that the Senate version would increase the amount of necessary compensation an employer pays to an employee from $200 to $500 for the purposes of determining whether or not the employee qualifies as a QPA. The Senate bill experienced the same fate as the House version, dying in the Senate Finance Committee, after receiving 17 additional co-sponsors.

On April 26, 2023, U.S. Reps. Buchanan and Chu introduced H.R. 2871 (118th Congress), entitled "Performing Artist Tax Parity Act of 2023." It uses the same language as the Senate version from the previous Congress. The bill was referred the House Ways and Means Committee and garnered 101 additional co-sponsors. Senators Mark Warner and Thomas Tillis (R) of North Carolina introduced a companion bill, S. 4747 (118th Congress), entitled "Performing Artist Tax Parity Act of 2024," in the U.S. Senate on July 23, 2024. Its language was nearly identical to the House version, the only exception being that the effective date would commence one year later. It was immediately referred to the Senate Finance Committee. Neither house's version of the bill advanced beyond committee.

On January 24, 2025, U.S. Reps. Buchanan and Chu, along with 12 other original cosponsors, introduced H.R. 721 (119th Congress), entitled "Performing Artist Tax Parity Act of 2025." The language of this bill uses the same language of the bills introduced in the previous Congress, with an effective date of tax years beginning after December 31, 2024. It was immediately referred to the House Ways and Means Committee and, as of January 25, 2026, the bill has 26 cosponsors. Senators Warner and Tillis introduced a companion bill, S. 1121 (119th Congress), entitled "Performing Artist Tax Parity Act of 2025," with identical language in the U.S. Senate on March 25, 2024. It was immediately referred to the Senate Finance Committee and, as of January 25, 2026, has no additional cosponsors.
