= Howard Taubman =

American arts critic (1907–1996)

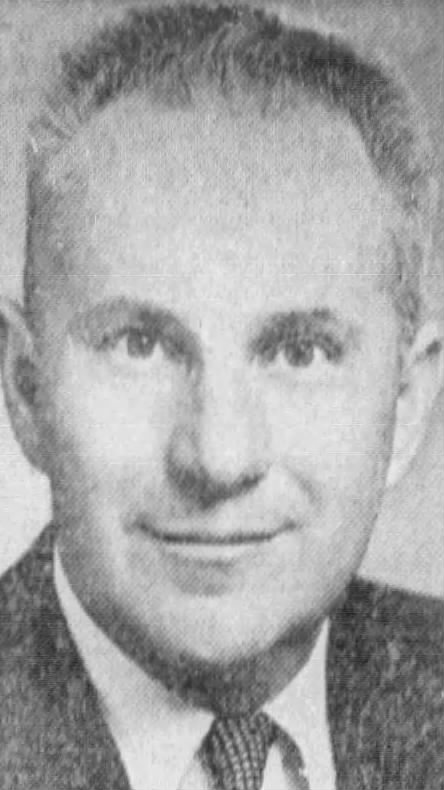
- Taubman, circa 1970
- Born: Hyman Howard Taubman; July 4, 1907; Manhattan, New York City, New York, United States
- Died: January 8, 1996 (aged 88); Sarasota, Florida, United States
- Occupation: Music critic • Theater critic
- Employer(s): The New York Times; Exxon Corporation
- Spouse(s): Nora S. Stern (m. 1934; died 1985) Lori March (m. 1988–1996)

Hyman Howard Taubman (July 4, 1907 – January 8, 1996) was an American music critic, theater critic, and author.

== Biography ==
Born in Manhattan, Taubman attended DeWitt Clinton High School and then won a four-year scholarship to Cornell University, from which he graduated, as a Phi Beta Kappa member, in 1929.

He then returned to New York and began working for The New York Times. He joined the Music Department there in 1930. In 1935, he was named Music Editor. For about a year, from 1944 to 1945, Taubman served in the Army and worked in Italy as a writer for Stars and Stripes.

In 1955, he became the chief music critic at the Times, replacing Olin Downes upon Downes' death. Also in the 1950s, Taubman acted as the ghostwriter of Marian Anderson's autobiography My Lord, What a Morning.

In 1960, he took the post of chief drama critic for the Times after Brooks Atkinson retired from that position. Taubman remained in that role until 1965.

In 1961, Taubman, along with six other theater critics, was the victim of a famous hoax when Broadway producer David Merrick placed a newspaper ad for his show Subways Are for Sleeping. The ad appeared to quote praise from Taubman, Walter Kerr, and other prominent New York critics for the commercially faltering musical. The individuals quoted, however, were not the theater critics themselves, but like-named New Yorkers hired by Merrick to provide positive quotes.

From 1966 until he retired in 1972, Taubman was a critic-at-large for the Times writing about cultural events from around the globe. After retiring from the Times, Taubman worked as a consultant to Exxon Corporation for the PBS series Great Performances.

Taubman was the author of several books, primarily related to music. He was the recipient of honorary degrees from the Philadelphia Academy of Music, Oberlin College, and Temple University.

Taubman was twice married and the father of two sons, William and Philip. His first wife was teacher Nora S. Stern, who died in 1985. In 1988, he married the actress Lori March. Taubman died in Sarasota, Florida, at the age of 88.

== Works ==
- The Pleasure of Their Company (Amadeus Press, 1994)
- The Making of the American Theatre (Coward McCann, 1965)
- How to Bring up your Child to Enjoy Music (1958)
- How to Build a Record Library (1953)
- The Maestro: The Life of Arturo Toscanini (Simon and Schuster, 1951)
- Music on My Beat: An Intimate Volume of Shop Talk (1943)
- Music as a Profession (C. Scribner's Sons, 1939)
- Opera: Front and Back (C. Scribner's Sons, 1938)

== Sources ==
- Severo, Richard (January 9, 1996). "Howard Taubman, 88, a Times Music Critic". The New York Times.
- Baker's Biographical Dictionary of Musicians, Centennial Edition. Nicolas Slonimsky, Editor. Schirmer, 2001
