= Three Steps to Heaven (TV series) =

American TV soap opera (1953–1954)

- Genre: Soap opera
- Created by: Irving Vendig
- Country of origin: United States
- Original language: English
- No. of seasons: 1

Production
- Camera setup: Single-camera
- Running time: 15 mins.

Original release
- Release: August 5, 1953 – December 31, 1954

Three Steps to Heaven is an American soap opera that aired on NBC from August 3, 1953 to December 31, 1954. It was written by Irving Vendig. Don Pardo was the announcer. One of the directors was Gordon Rigsby.

== Synopsis ==
The show followed Mary Claire 'Poco' Thurmond, who moved to New York City in hopes of becoming a successful model.

The program was partially sponsored by Procter & Gamble, its commercials alternating between Tuesday, Wednesday, and Friday of one week and Tuesday and Friday of the next week.

== Cast ==
- Kathleen Maguire, Phyllis Hill and Diana Douglas as Poco Thurmond
- Mark Roberts and Walter Brooks as Bill Morgan
- Ginger McManus as Angela
- Lori March as Jennifer
- Joe Brown Jr. as Mike
- Mona Burns as Charlotte Doane
- Laurie Vendig as Alice
- Doris Rich as Mrs. Doane
- Roger Sullivan as Barry Thurmond
- Inge Adams as Laura
- Frank Twedell as Uncle Frank
- Eata Linden as Pigeon Malloy
- Earl George as Walter Jones
- Beth Douglas as Nan
- John Marley as Vince Bannister
- Dort Clark as Alan Anderson
