= Morning Star (TV series) =

1960s American soap opera

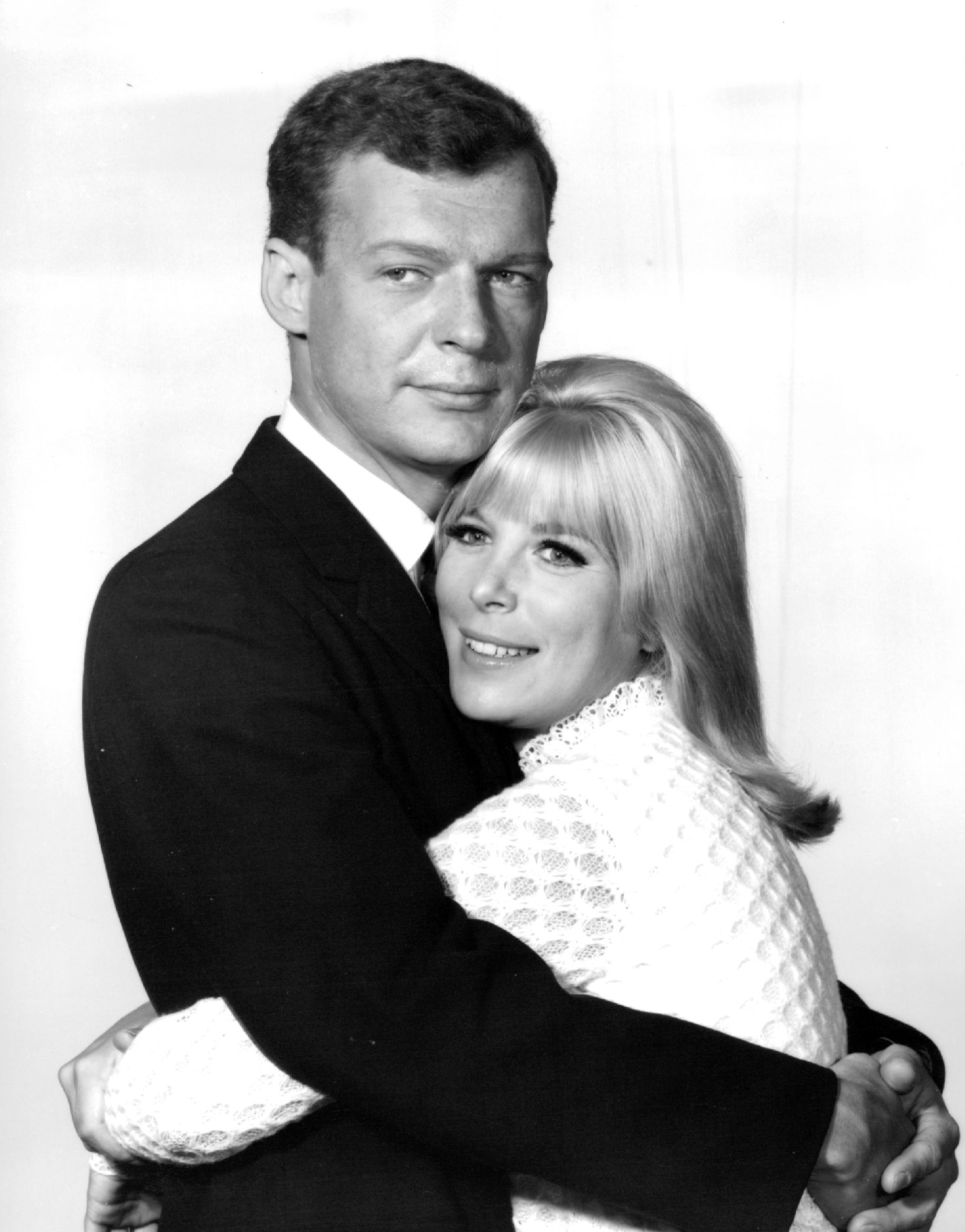
Elizabeth Perry as Katy Elliot and Edward Mallory as Bill Riley, 1965.

Morning Star is an American daytime soap opera that aired on NBC from September 27, 1965 to July 1, 1966. The show was created by Ted Corday who would later create the daytime serial Days of Our Lives.

The show aired at 11:00 AM; it was paired with Paradise Bay which aired after it and also was created by Ted Corday. Morning Star and Paradise Bay were also cancelled on the same day. Morning Star was one of the first soap operas to air in color.

== Overview ==
The show followed Katy Elliot, a fashion designer from Connecticut who moved to New York City to pursue her career. It chronicled her trials and tribulations, as well as those of her roommates, Joan Mitchell and Joan's daughter, Liz. Katy had left her hometown of Springdale after the death of her fiancé, Greg Ross, who had been killed in a traffic accident just before their planned wedding.

In New York, Katy met and fell in love with Bill Riley. She also maintained contact with her aunt Millie Elliot, her uncle Ed Elliot, a judge in Springdale, and her sixteen-year-old sister, Jan.

As did Days of our Lives, the show opened with an epigraph, as was customary for soap operas of the time, "No matter how dark the night, there is always a new dawn to come. The sun is but a morning star."

== Ratings ==
1965-1966 Season

- 1. As the World Turns 13.9
- 2. The Guiding Light 11.2
- 3. Search for Tomorrow 11.0
- 4. The Secret Storm 10.9
- 13. ″Morning Star″ 4.1 (Debut)
