= The Edge of Night =

American television crime drama and soap opera (1956–1984)

- Also known as: Edge of Night
- Genre: Soap opera; Drama; Crime; Mystery
- Created by: Irving Vendig
- Starring: Donald May; Ann Flood; Forrest Compton; Lawrence Hugo; Lois Kibbee; Sharon Gabet; Joel Crothers; Mandel Kramer
- Composers: Elliot Lawrence (June 14, 1976- December 28, 1984); Paul Taubman (April 2, 1956-June 11, 1976)
- Country of origin: United States
- Original language: English
- No. of seasons: 28
- No. of episodes: 7,420

Production
- Executive producer: Erwin Nicholson
- Producers: Robert Driscoll; Rick Edelstein; Charles Fisher; Freddie Bartholomew; Jacqueline Haber; Werner Michel; Erwin Nicholson; Charles Polachek
- Running time: 30 minutes
- Production company: Procter & Gamble Productions

Original release
- Network: CBS
- Release: April 2, 1956 – November 28, 1975
- Network: ABC
- Release: December 1, 1975 – December 28, 1984

The Edge of Night is an American mystery crime drama soap opera, created by Irving Vendig and produced by Procter & Gamble Productions.

It debuted on CBS on April 2, 1956, and ran as a live broadcast on that network for most of its run until November 28, 1975. The series then moved to ABC, where it aired from December 1, 1975, until December 28, 1984. 7,420 episodes were produced, of which some 1,800 are available for syndication.

The program had several prominent fans, including author Sir P. G. Wodehouse, actresses Bette Davis and Tallulah Bankhead, as well as First Lady Eleanor Roosevelt.

== Concept ==
The Edge of Night, whose working title was The Edge of Darkness, premiered on April 2, 1956, as one of the first two half-hour serials on television, the other being As the World Turns. Prior to the debuts of both shows, 15-minute-long shows had been the standard. Both shows aired on CBS, sponsored by Procter & Gamble.

The show was originally conceived as the daytime television version of Perry Mason, which was popular in novel and radio formats at the time. Mason's creator Erle Stanley Gardner was to create and write the show, but a last-minute tiff between the CBS network and him caused Gardner to pull his support from the idea. CBS insisted that Mason be given a love interest to placate daytime soap opera audiences, but Gardner refused to take Mason in that direction. Gardner eventually patched up his differences with CBS, and Perry Mason debuted in prime time on September 21, 1957.

In 1956, a writer from the Perry Mason radio show, Irving Vendig, created a retooled idea of the show for daytime television—and The Edge of Night was born. John Larkin, radio's best identified Perry Mason, was cast as the protagonist-star, initially as a detective, eventually as an attorney, in a thinly veiled copy of Perry Mason.

=== Setting ===
Unlike Perry Mason, whose adventures took place in Southern California, the daytime series was set in the fictional city of Monticello, located in the Midwestern United States. A frequent backdrop for the show's early scenes was a restaurant called the Ho-Hi-Ho. The state capital, however, was known generically as "Capital City"; the state in which Monticello was located was never identified. From its beginning in 1956 until roughly 1980, the downtown skyline of the city of Cincinnati stood in as Monticello. Procter & Gamble, which produced the show, is based in Cincinnati. In later years, the Los Angeles skyline replaced that of Cincinnati. The skyline motif was eventually eliminated altogether in the final two years of the show, as was the word "The" in the title.

=== Format ===
During most of the show's run, viewers were treated to an announcer enthusiastically and energetically announcing the show's title, "The Eeedge...of Night!" Bob Dixon was the first announcer in 1956, followed by Herbert Duncan. The two voices most identified with the show, however, were those of Harry Kramer (1957–1972) and Hal Simms, who announced until the series ended in 1984.

The Edge of Night played on more artistic levels than probably any other soap of its time. It was unique among daytime soap operas in that it focused on crime, rather than domestic and romantic matters. The police, district attorneys, and medical examiners of fictional Monticello, United States, dealt with a steady onslaught of gangsters, drug dealers, blackmailers, cultists, international spies, corrupt politicians, psychopaths, and murderous debutantes, while at the same time coping with more usual soap opera problems like courtship, marriage, divorce, child custody battles, and amnesia. The show's particular focus on crime was recognized in 1980, when, in honor of its 25 years on the air, The Edge of Night was given a special Edgar Award by the Mystery Writers of America. The Edge of Night had more prominent male characters than most soap operas, and included genuine humor in its scripts to balance the heaviness of the storylines.

== Cast and characters ==
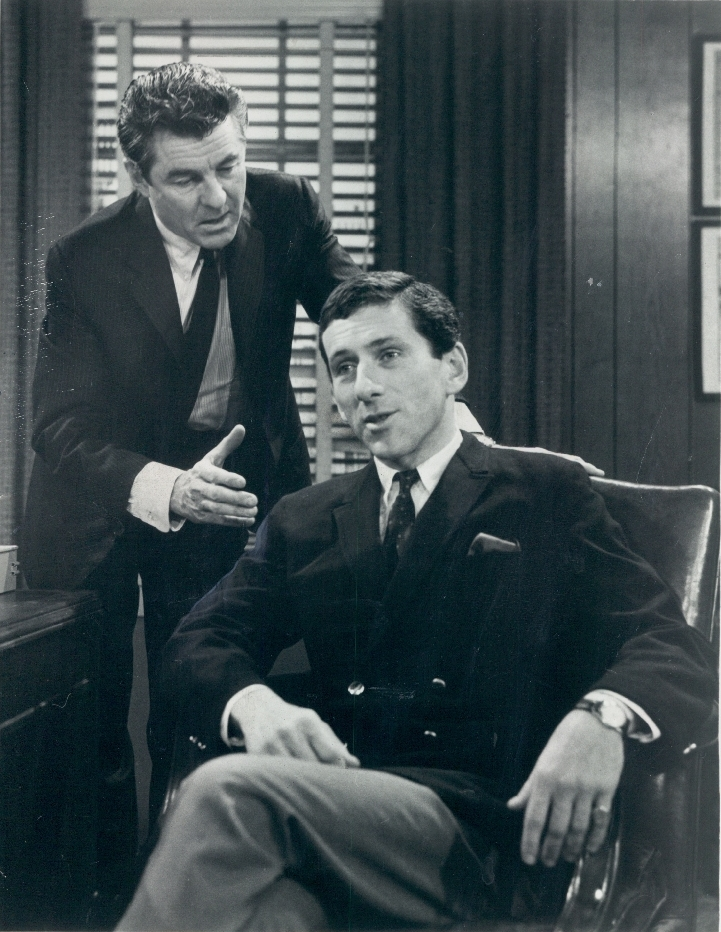
Laurence Hugo and Barry Newman as Mike Karr and John Barnes (1966)

The show's central protagonist was Mike Karr, tireless crimefighter, introduced as a police officer who was finishing law school. This character evolved from the earlier Perry Mason character on radio. He then progressed to the district attorney's office as an assistant district attorney, started his own practice as a defense attorney, then became district attorney of Monticello. Karr was portrayed by three actors: John Larkin (radio's Perry Mason), Laurence Hugo, and Forrest Compton.

Among the show's cast members who appeared on The Edge of Night early in their careers and later gained fame were Mariann Aalda, Leah Ayres, Conrad Bain, David Birney, Dixie Carter, Kate Capshaw, Philip Casnoff, Thom Christopher, Margaret Colin, James Coco, Jacqueline Courtney, John Cullum, Marcia Cross, Irene Dailey, Frances Fisher, Jennifer Joan Taylor, Lucy Lee Flippin, David Froman, Penny Fuller, Scott Glenn, Sam Groom, Don Hastings, Patrick Horgan, Earle Hyman, Željko Ivanek, Peter Kastner, Lori Loughlin, Bill Macy, Nancy Marchand, Kiel Martin, Doug McKeon, Julianne Moore, John Allen Nelson, Barry Newman, Bebe Neuwirth, Christopher Norris, Antony Ponzini, Lawrence Pressman, Tony Roberts, Reva Rose, Mark Rydell, Dolph Sweet, Millee Taggart, Holland Taylor, Richard Thomas, John Travolta, Ann Wedgeworth, Jacklyn Zeman and Miriam Colón.

Over the years, the show featured many notable performers and celebrities, usually in small cameo appearances, but some in roles important to the storylines. Among the show's guest stars were Willie Aames, Amanda Blake, Dick Cavett, Nancy Coleman, Professor Irwin Corey, Selma Diamond, James Douglas, Alfred Drake, John Fiedler, Betty Guarde, Rita Gam, Eva Gabor, Jack Gilford, Frank Gorshin, Farley Granger, Cynthia Gregory, Micki Grant, Lisa Howard, Kim Hunter, Leon Janney, Rita Jenrette, Arch Johnson, Larry King, Ed Marinaro, Donald May, Sam McMurray, James Mitchell, Meg Myles, Tom Nardini, Wade Nichols, Peaches and Herb, Minerva Pious, Anne Revere, Rosemary Rice, Hugh Reilly, Wallace Shawn, Pat Stanley, Shirley Stoler, Elaine Stritch, Jane White, Ann Williams, and Jerry Zaks.

== Storylines ==
For the show's duration, the stories either revolved around or touched upon Monticello lawyer (and former Monticello police officer) Mike Karr.

=== The 1950s ===
As the show began, Mike Karr's relationship with Sara Lane (Teal Ames) reproduced the radio serial's Perry Mason/Della Street relationship. Adding a complication for Mike Karr, Sara's family was involved in organized crime. In the early years of the show, Sara's younger brother, Jack (Don Hastings), was drawn into the criminal world by corrupt uncle Harry Lane (Lauren Gilbert). Nevertheless, Mike and Sara eventually married. Their happiness was short-lived when Sara was written out of the show, killed as she saved the life of their daughter Laurie Ann, who ran into the street into the path of an automobile. By the 1960s, Laurie Ann was a teenager, supplying many plots for the show, and a young wife and mother by the 1970s.

=== The 1960s ===
Mike later married Nancy Pollock (Ann Flood), a journalist who helped in many of his cases. Nancy had two siblings: Lee, who eventually married Geri McGrath, and Elaine, nicknamed "Cookie". Cookie was also involved in major story arcs. Cookie was married first to Malcolm Thomas, who cheated on her and then made her a widow. Later she married Ron Christopher, whose dealings with loan sharks affected Mike's good friends Louise and Philip Capice.

Other important characters were Police Chief Bill Marceau (Mandel Kramer), who was one of Karr's best friends and shared a tremendous mutual respect, rare between a defense attorney and a chief of police (perhaps because Mike had once been a police officer himself), Marceau's secretary (and later wife) Martha (Teri Keane), fellow attorney Adam Drake (Donald May), his client, then secretary (and later on, his wife) Nicole Travis (Maeve McGuire; Jayne Bentzen; Lisa Sloan), and wealthy socialite Geraldine Whitney (Lois Kibbee).

In one storyline, Nicole Travis (later, Drake) was victimized by two different women, Stephanie Martin (Alice Hirson) and Pamela Stewart (Irene Dailey), who both wanted Nicole gone but for different reasons. Pamela was Adam Drake's ex-wife, and she knew Adam was falling in love with Nicole. She reasoned that Adam might return to her if Nicole were not there. Although Stephanie did attempt to kill Nicole on at least one occasion (by poisoning her bourbon), she more interested in terrorising her in revenge for the deaths of her husband and daughter. Stephanie's husband had borrowed money from loan sharks who answered to Nicole's gangster father. He could not repay the debt, so Nicole's father ordered his men to cut the brakelines on his car. The whole family, including Stephanie, her husband, their son, and identical twin daughters Karen and Debbie were in the resulting accident, which only Stephanie and Debbie survived. (Debbie was struck dumb by the incident and was receiving in-patient therapy; while Stephanie unwittingly compounded the problem by calling her "Karen", thus making it clear she wished it had been the other twin who had survived.) Nicole's father was in prison, so Stephanie went after his daughter instead - gradually moving closer and closer, and eventually taking a job as one Nicole's two shop assistants. Stephanie was working late at the shop when she stabbed in the back, just as Nicole arrived to confront her - having learned earlier that evening that Stephanie was behind the threats on her life. Debbie, who had been sleeping on a window seat until just before the stabbing occurred, saw her mother on the floor with the dagger in her back and shouted "Pull it out! Pull it out!"; which Nicole did. Thus, Nicole was accused of murdering Stephanie because her fingerprints were on the weapon; and Debbie was struck dumb again. Adam Drake defended Nicole against increasingly impossible odds, eventually realising that Debbie was the key to Nicole's exoneration. He had to find a way to make her speak again. Knowing Debbie had strong affection for the therapist who was helping her, he proceed to accuse the woman of being the killer. This proved to be the catalyst the restored Debbie's ability to speak again, to defend her friend. Adam then showed Debbie a picture of Nicole and asked if it was the woman who killed her mother and Debbie answered no. In a classic Perry Mason-like climax, Debbie was called to testify at Nicole's trial; and when asked on the stand if the woman who killed her mother was in court, she said "Yes. Her!" as she pointed to Pamela Stewart - who had killed Stephanie by mistake. In the darkness and because she attacked from behind, Pamela thought she was stabbing Nicole.

=== The 1970s ===
Adam subsequently left Mike Karr's law firm as partner and opened his own practice. He hired Nicole as his secretary, and their romance blossomed. But when Nicole sensed his lack of interest in marriage, she went to work for another attorney, Jake Berman (Ward Costello). She continued to date Adam and told him if he did not propose to her by New Year's Eve, their relationship was finished. Shortly afterward, she got a marriage proposal from her new boss, widower Jake Berman. She did not accept it but moved to New York City with him when he decided to become a partner at another law firm. Adam then searched for Nicole in New York until he found her at the stroke of midnight on New Year's Eve and proposed to her. When Adam and Nicole returned to Monticello, so did Jake, determined to prevent them from marrying. He plotted with ex-convict Johnny Dallas (John LaGioia) to frame Adam for attempted murder. Johnny did not show up, but Jake was murdered by Joel Gantry (Paul Henry Itkin, Nicholas Pryor) and Adam was arrested for the murder immediately following his wedding to Nicole at the Karr residence. The day before the jury would have found Adam guilty, Joel Gantry was found by Kevin Jamison (Dick Shoberg) in San Francisco. Joel was really Edith Berman's son from her previous marriage, and he was convinced that Jake had murdered his mother. Adam and Nicole thus were reunited and settled into married life. Sometime later, she was believed to have died in a boating accident in the Caribbean but was discovered alive 18 months later by Kevin Jamison (then played by John Driver) in France. At the same time, Adam proposed to Assistant District Attorney Brandy Henderson (Dixie Carter). Adam and Nicole eventually reunited about six months after Nicole was discovered alive, and Brandy left town another six months later. Their marriage ended when Adam was murdered. A young doctor, Miles Cavanaugh, came along and became interested in Nicole. Although the actress who played Nicole was only four years older than the actor playing Miles, the producers replaced her with another actress who was ten years younger than he - a rarity in the soap opera genre, presumably done to break completely with the prior Nicole storylines. Nicole and Miles eventually married but the new actress was herself replaced four years later by another actress. Two years after that, Nicole died after her makeup powder was poisoned.

In the show's later years, Mike's beautiful daughter Laurie Ann (Emily Prager), by now a young adult, was an important character. Her relationship with Jonah Lockwood, a sociopath, almost cost her her life, but he was revealed to be an alternate persona of Keith Whitney, scion of the wealthy Whitney family, nemesis of the Karrs and Marceau. Laurie subsequently became engaged to marry Mike Karr's law associate Vic Lamont (Ted Tinling). During this time Mike Karr was being stalked by a gangster Lobo Haynes (Fred J. Scollay) over a shipment of drugs which led to Vic being pleading guilty to murder and going to prison to conduct undercover work where he was almost stabbed to death in a prison shower but his life was saved by inmate Johnny Dallas. Johnny was later released from prison and became the owner of a restaurant The New Moon Cafe. Laurie (now played by Jeanne Ruskin) played the piano at the restaurant leading to her and Johnny falling in love. When Vic found out Laurie and Johnny were together in Chicago when he didn't show up to shoot and wound Jake Berman, he left Laurie. In a drunken stupor, Vic married client Kay Reynolds (Elizabeth Farley). Laurie and Johnny eventually married and Vic was murdered saving Johnny's life in a staged holdup at the New Moon Cafe when it was revealed that Johnny was doing undercover work. Laurie (now played by Linda Cook) and Johnny had a baby they named John Victor. However, Laurie developed mental problems that led her to being placed in a mental institution, and Johnny ran away.

Another major character introduced in the later years was Assistant District attorney Draper Scott (Tony Craig), who started out working alongside Brandy Henderson and tried to date her but she was still in love with Adam Drake. Draper prosecuted Nicole's cousin Serena Faraday (Louise Shaffer) for the murder of her ex-husband Mark Faraday (Bernie McInery) but Adam defended her and proved it was her alternate personality "Josie" and she was sent to a mental institution. Draper left the D. A. office and joined forces with Mike Karr after Adam Drake was shot and killed. He eventually married April Cavanaugh (Terri Davis) sister of Dr. Miles Cavanaugh. One of the later major story arcs was about a train wreck where Draper had been unjustly convicted of murder, escaping from the train accident. There was also a storyline in the mid-1970s involving a troubled woman (Nicole's cousin, Serena Faraday) who changed her personality to Josie as she donned a frizzy, black wig in perhaps a nod to One Life to Live's popular Victoria Lord/Niki Smith storyline. Another notable character was Charlotte "Raven" Alexander Jamison Swift Whitney (Juanin Clay, then Sharon Gabet), a duplicitous coquette who became more stable and faithful in the latter years.

Whitney family matriarch, tough Geraldine Whitney (Lois Kibbee) suffered the misfortune of losing most of those close to her to untimely deaths: her first husband, two sons, a beloved daughter-in-law, a nephew, and she herself was nearly killed, having been pushed down a flight of stairs in 1975 by her ne'er-do-well son-in-law Noel Douglas (Dick Latessa). She became close to Raven Alexander and Raven's ex-husband Logan Swift during later years (and became de facto grandmother to Raven and Logan's son). However, when Logan was killed in 1984, Geraldine could hardly bear the grief to learn that, through a series of events, she had accidentally shot him.

=== The 1980s ===
Near the end of the series' run came a rather unusual story wherein Mike and Nancy, after sleeping in twin beds for nearly their entire married life, decided to "go all out, and buy a double bed", thereby retiring their twin beds for good.

Uniquely among daytime dramas at the time, The Edge of Night finished its run with an ominous (and intentional) cliffhanger, revealing that an old enemy—Louis Van Dine, who had supposedly been sent to the state penitentiary—had returned to settle some scores, and none of the main protagonists was safe. In addition, police detective Chris Egan (Jennifer Taylor) - spying a supposedly deceased henchman of Van Dine, Donald Hext - followed Hext into a previously unknown Monticello Street called "Wonderland Lane". There, she discovered Van Dine's sister, Alicia Van Dine (Chris Weatherhead), in a shop. Alicia's brother viciously stabbed her in the back; her allegedly dying words to Chris Egan were: "...Off, off with her head...." Egan barely escaped from the shop after Van Dine and Hext attempted to capture her and ran out of Wonderland Lane, briefly falling by the post next to the street sign, a stuffed white rabbit propped against it.

The final scene of the series is of Chris Egan telling Mike Karr and others of her encounter with Louis Van Dine and Donald Hext, in addition to Alicia Van Dine's stabbing. The show's theme plays over the dialogue, masking Karr's words, but the audience is left to know that the story of Monticello continues onward, albeit off the air. The reason for the cliffhanger was that Procter & Gamble believed that they could find another network to take over production of The Edge of Night, or possibly continue the show in first-run syndication, but in 1984, there were no cable networks willing to take on such an expensive endeavor.

== Broadcast history ==
=== CBS ===
Unlike most soap operas, which build a solid audience slowly over many years, The Edge of Night was an instant hit with daytime viewers; it amassed an audience of nine million in its first year, in some respects because the public perceived it as a daytime Perry Mason, as the producers of The Edge of Night had intended. Through the 1960s, the show continued to gain popularity; it consistently ranked as one of the top six rated soap operas, alongside the rest of CBS' daytime lineup. It peaked at #2 (behind As the World Turns) in the 1966–67 television season and came in at #2 between 1969 and 1971.

At one point, the audience for The Edge of Night was estimated to be more than 50% male, largely due to the show's crime format and its late start time of 4:30 p.m. (3:30 Central). On July 1, 1963, the show was moved to the 3:30/2:30 time period after CBS gave the 4:30/3:30 slot back to its affiliates, primarily used by them for children's programs, local or syndicated. The Edge of Night dominated the 3:30 slot even over otherwise-hit programs like NBC's You Don't Say! and ABC's Dark Shadows and One Life to Live. However when The Edge of Night was moved to 2:30 p.m. (1:30 Central) on September 11, 1972, per Procter & Gamble's insistence upon running all of its shows back-to-back, the change caused fellow P&G soap The Guiding Light to be shifted 30 minutes earlier to 2 p.m. As the World Turns and Search for Tomorrow, P&G's other two soaps, were not affected by the timeslot changes nor was the interrupted affiliate break, usually for local newscasts, at 1 p.m./noon). This timeslot change caused a drastic slide in The Edge of Night's viewership, dropping from fourth in the Nielsen ratings—among the 17 daytime serials on the air at the time—to 10th place, presumed to be because many male viewers and teenagers were unable to make it home from work or school earlier in the afternoon to watch; as a consequence, The Edge of Night would become CBS's lowest-rated soap. This would not be the last time that a Procter & Gamble soap airing on CBS experienced a dramatic ratings decline after being moved to the 2:30 p.m. timeslot; the same problem would affect its long-running sister soap Search for Tomorrow in that same slot seven years later.

By summer 1975, CBS began considering expansions of two of its Procter & Gamble-owned soap operas, Search for Tomorrow and As the World Turns, to 45 minutes daily, in response to NBC's full-hour expansions of Another World and Days of Our Lives some months earlier. The network changed its mind, however, when it realized that doing so would force them to take the 30-minute affiliate break slot at 1/noon away from local stations. CBS was also put in a bind because it had already decided to expand another of its daytime program, game show The Price Is Right, to an hour starting in November (a move that would prove to be a major ratings success for the network, more-so than the expansion of As the World Turns). CBS decided to simply expand As the World Turns, which was still the top-rated soap opera on television, to 60 minutes starting in December. Since CBS decided against taking the 1 p.m. slot from the affiliates, and the network did not intend to move As the World Turns from its 1:30 p.m. slot, this made the low-rated Edge of Night expendable, and CBS told Procter & Gamble that it would not be renewing the series (although the network conceivably could have returned the soap to late afternoons, keeping control of the 50% male audience it had previously before the move to 2:30 p.m.).

=== ABC ===
Despite CBS canceling it, Procter & Gamble wanted to continue The Edge of Night, and soon inquired with the other networks about picking up the series. ABC expressed interest in bringing The Edge of Night to its daytime lineup, and was willing to return it to late afternoons where it had previously done so well. It was the only network that did not have, then or in the past, a P&G serial on its schedule, and was excited to work with the company. However, a major issue almost resulted in the outright cancellation of the serial before such a move, the first of its kind, would take place.

CBS had originally planned on expanding As the World Turns at the beginning of the new season in September 1975. ABC's daytime schedule was full at the time with programs whose contracts it had to honor, and the earliest it could have a spot open on the schedule would be in December. This meant that it would be approximately three months at least before The Edge of Night would air its first episode on ABC, and the network was worried that a three-month absence would result in a loss of viewers. Instead, a compromise was struck where CBS would keep The Edge of Night on its schedule for the time being, and once ABC found a place for it, which it did when it canceled You Don't Say! on December 1, 1975, the expansion of As the World Turns and network change of The Edge of Night would take place. On the date of the network switch, CBS placed Guiding Light in The Edge of Night's former 2:30 slot, returning to the timeslot where that network originally placed the show when it expanded to a half-hour broadcast seven years earlier.

The last CBS episode of The Edge of Night, aired on November 28, 1975, ending with the discovery that Nicole Drake was alive. She had been presumed dead in an explosion 18 months earlier while on a boating trip with her husband Adam. ABC aired the show beginning on December 1, with a 90-minute premiere. This episode picked up where CBS had left off the previous Friday, with Geraldine Whitney still in a coma after having been pushed down a flight of stairs in a murder attempt by her daughter-in-law Tiffany's second husband, Noel Douglas' girlfriend Tracy Dallas. Nicole—with the help of Geraldine's adopted "son", Kevin Jamison—regained her identity after suffering from amnesia since the boating-trip explosion. The final scene of that day's episode was a climax in which Serena Faraday, in her "Josie" split personality, shot and killed her husband on the steps of the courthouse.

The move to ABC made The Edge of Night the first serial to change from one broadcast network to another. (The only other soap to do so was its former CBS stablemate and fellow Procter & Gamble serial Search for Tomorrow, which moved to NBC in 1982, following a dispute with CBS over its 1981 shift from 12:30, where the show had aired since its 1951 premiere, to the 2:30 slot that caused the viewership decline that led to The Edge of Night's initial cancellation by CBS over six years earlier.)

Initially, The Edge of Night showed promise when it began airing on ABC. ABC aired The Edge of Night in the 4:00/3:00 p.m. late-afternoon time slot in the Eastern and Central Time Zones, and, due to a different scheduling pattern for ABC's West Coast feed, at noon in the Pacific Time Zone. At first, the show's overall ratings declined because fewer homes had access to it; this happened because many ABC affiliates had opted to run local or syndicated programming in the 4:00/3:00 slot, instead of the network feed, for many years and decided not to abandon the practice. As a result, in some markets, The Edge of Night disappeared after relocating from CBS to ABC. In other markets, stations (either a local ABC affiliate or an independent station that picked the show up) taped the program for delayed broadcast in a morning slot. Nevertheless, The Edge of Night was typically either first (or a close second) in its timeslot in markets where the local ABC station cleared it at 4:00 p.m. (Eastern Time); this was due mainly to the weakness of competing programs on CBS and NBC. Somerset, the spinoff to NBC's highly rated Another World, was the only other soap still airing in that timeslot but never got the ratings that the mother show received from airing one hour earlier; that show ended up being canceled the following year. Furthermore, the show's demographics were significantly better on ABC because the show got its youth and some of its male demographics back; thus, ABC was able to charge higher advertising rates for it than several series with higher audience ratings.

Despite never recovering the ground it lost from its CBS days, even sliding into the lowest third tier in the ratings by 1977, ratings for The Edge of Night improved slightly during the early 1980s, thanks in no small part to the overall rise of ABC's other soaps in the ratings, with General Hospital, All My Children and One Life to Live all winning their respective timeslots, along with fresh new characters (such as Steve, Draper, Logan, Deborah, April, Raven and Damian). While the numbers were less solid, The Edge of Night still pulled in ratings in the 5.0 range and improved its position in the Nielsens, peaking at 11th in both 1981 and 1982. However, from 1982 on, ratings fell as even more ABC affiliates dropped the show in favor of the aforementioned syndicated offerings. At the end of the 1981–82 television season, The Edge of Night pulled in a 5.0 rating, but with the resulting preemptions, the show's rating dropped to a 3.8 in 1983. This caused Procter & Gamble's profit margins on the program to shrink with each passing year.

The series was also broadcast in Canada on CBC Television beginning in the early 1970s, but after more than a decade, CBC opted in the fall of 1982 to drop The Edge of Night from its daytime afternoon lineup and replace it with the ABC-owned soap opera, All My Children.

In May 1983, Procter & Gamble dismissed the show's head writer, Henry Slesar, whose 15-year job with the soap opera was at that time the longest in daytime serial history, and appointed as its new head writer Lee Sheldon, a writer and producer of primetime television shows. (He had been a writer on CBS's Tucker's Witch earlier in the season.) Although Sheldon's emphasis on humor (an attribute he had honed while working on Tucker's Witch) reflected an attempt to boost ratings, the show's ratings slump only worsened as even more ABC affiliates dropped the show.

By fall 1984, The Edge of Night aired on only 106 of ABC's 213 affiliate stations. A further two dozen affiliates planned to drop the series in the first quarter of 1985, with many station managers doing so because they wanted local or syndicated programming to air in the 4:00 timeslot. Although ABC intended to continue The Edge of Night, even offering to move it to a mid-morning timeslot, Procter & Gamble could no longer afford to continue producing the show due to the constant loss of revenue from frequent preemptions. Thus, on October 26, 1984, ABC and Procter & Gamble made a joint announcement that the final telecast of Edge of Night (whose title had been shortened to three words) would take place on December 28 of that year. At this point, the show's ratings were less than half of what they had been at the beginning of the decade; at the end of the 1984–85 television season, it finished last in the daytime ratings race with a 2.6 rating in only four months of episodes.

To date, The Edge of Night is the last regularly scheduled ABC network program to have aired in the 4:00–4:30 p.m. (Eastern Time) time slot; ABC returned the half-hour slot to its affiliates after The Edge of Night finished its run. NBC had done this in 1977, while CBS, which programmed the 4:00 p.m. time slot with Body Language when The Edge of Night left the air, followed suit in September 1986 after canceling Press Your Luck a month prior.

==== Post-cancellation aftermath ====
The cancellation of The Edge of Night, along with ABC's relinquishing of what had become a death slot at the time of the show's demise, had a major impact on the first-run syndication market as ABC affiliates sought new programming to fill the open timeslot in the midst of the 1984–85 television season. The most significant impact occurred in the New York City market, where the cancellation of The Edge of Night created an opening on ABC's East Coast flagship, WABC-TV. Taking advantage of this opening, distributor King World Productions reached an agreement to move the syndicated revival of Jeopardy!, already in the middle of its first season, over to WABC's open 4 p.m. slot from WNBC-TV, where it had been airing in an overnight time slot.

== Production ==
=== Executive producers ===
Name
Werner Michel
Charles Polachek
Erwin Nicholson

=== Head writers ===
Name
Irving Vendig
Irving Vendig and James Gentile
Lou Scofield
Henry Slesar
Lois Kibbee and Laure Durbrow (1981 WGA Strike)
Lee Sheldon

== Episode status ==
Most CBS episodes of The Edge of Night no longer exist as the series was broadcast live until September 1975, shortly before the move to ABC. The network had terminated its wiping practice of shows it owned in September 1972, but Procter & Gamble continued wiping tapes until 1978. Many monochrome episodes and some color episodes of the show were kinescoped; the color episodes in this format survive in black-and-white. Forty-five episodes of the CBS era are known to exist, the best-known of which include the Christmas Day 1974 episode and a September 1975 episode depicting the attempted murder of Geraldine. Some fans also have the second episode of the series (April 3, 1956), which featured Don Hastings, John Larkin and Teal Ames. The first two years of the ABC run also followed the tape-erasure practice, which ceased in 1978 for ABC and all Procter & Gamble shows.

From August 5, 1985, to January 19, 1989, reruns aired in a daily late-night timeslot on cable's USA Network, airing episodes from June 1981 up to the 1984 series finale.

From August 2006 to January 2009, Procter & Gamble made several of its classic soap operas available, a few episodes at a time, through AOL Video Service, downloadable free of charge. AOL downloads of The Edge of Night commenced with episode #6051, from July 17, 1979, and concluded with episode #6380, from November 6, 1980.

== Reception ==
Cleveland Amory of TV Guide found the storytelling so confusing and the subject matter so unpleasant that he lamented, "Why [do] other television shows die, while soap operas, no matter how sick they are, don't."

== Awards ==
=== Daytime Emmy Award wins ===
- 1985 "Outstanding Achievement in Music Direction and Composition for a Drama Series"
- 1984 "Outstanding Achievement in Any Area of Creative Technical Crafts - Electronic Camerawork"
- 1979 "Outstanding Achievement in Technical Excellence"
- 1974 "Outstanding Drama Series Writing"

=== Primetime Emmy Award wins ===
- 1973 "Outstanding Program Achievement in Daytime Drama" (Drama Series)

== See also ==
- Perry Mason
- Perry Mason (radio)
