= List of The Edge of Night characters =

The following is a list of characters from the Procter & Gamble daytime soap opera The Edge of Night, which ran from 1956 to 1984.

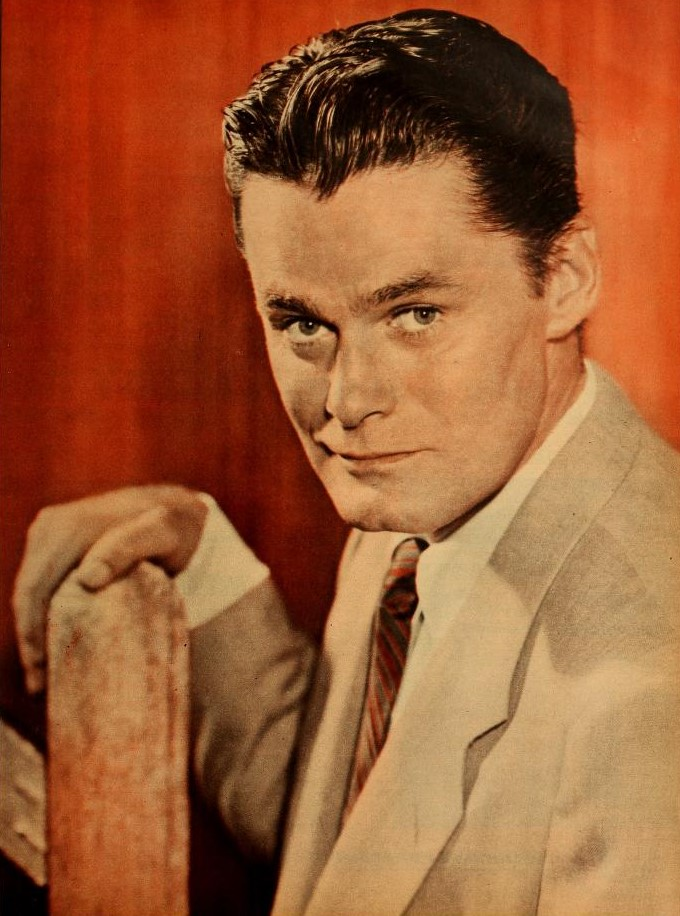
John Larkin originated the role of Mike Karr, portraying the character from 1956 to 1961.

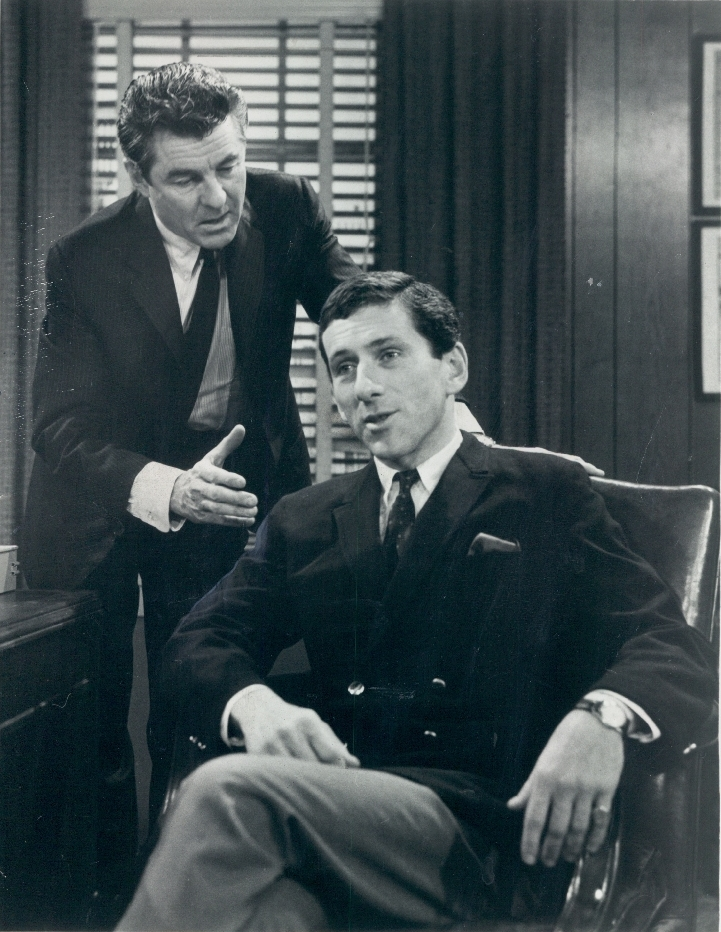
Laurence Hugo (left) portrayed Mike Karr from 1962 to 1971 (with Barry Newman as John Barnes, right).

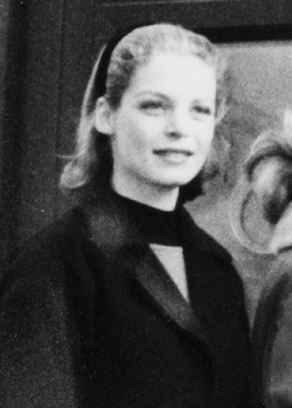
Millette Alexander played three different roles in the series: Gail Armstrong (1958–1959), Laura Hillyer (1965–1967) and Julie Jamison (1967–1968).

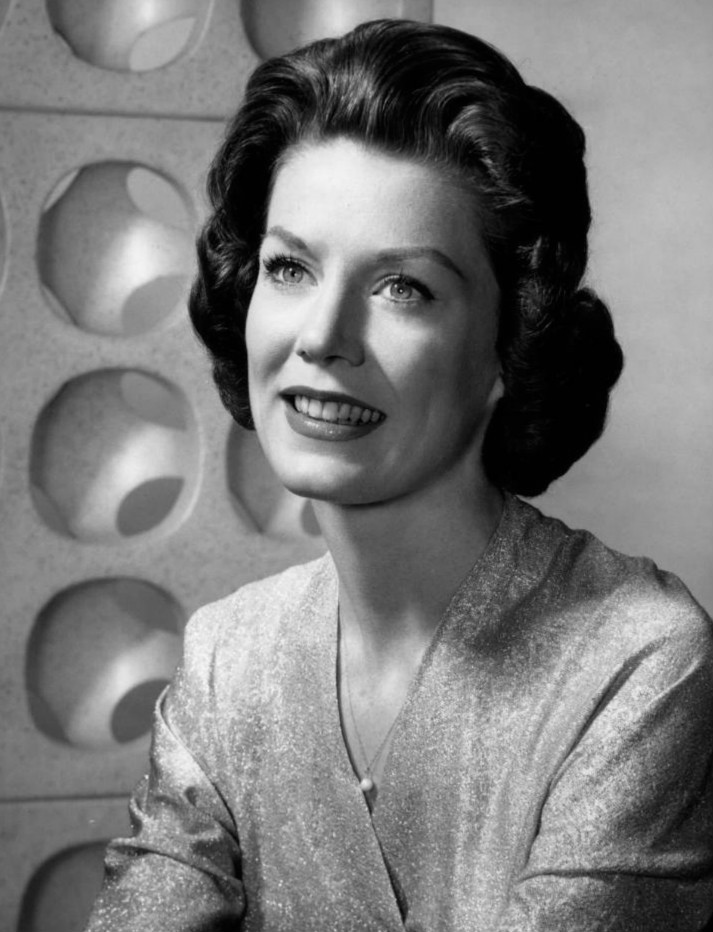
Ann Flood portrayed Nancy Pollock Karr from 1962 to 1984.

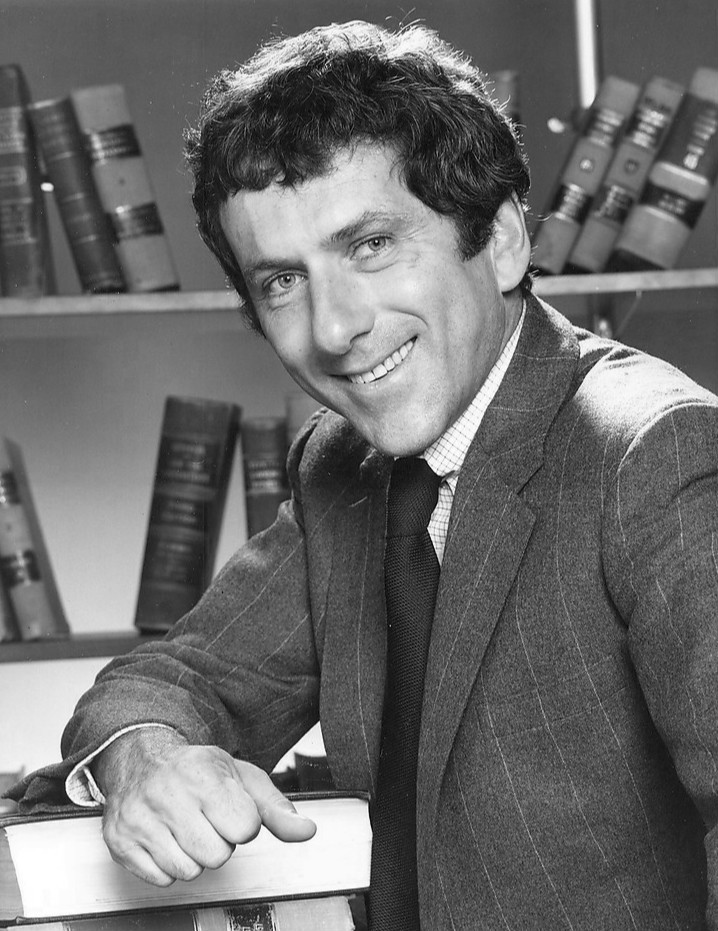
Barry Newman portrayed John Barnes from 1964to 1967.

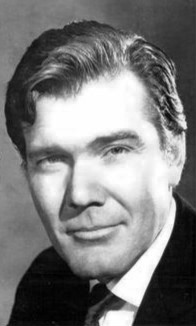
Donald May portrayed Adam Drake from 1967 to 1977.

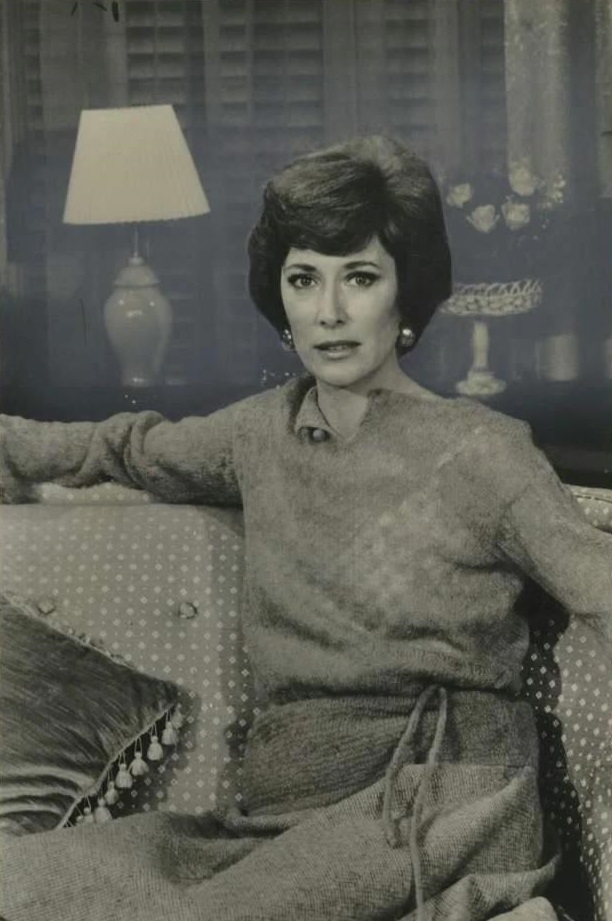
Maeve McGuire originated the role of Nicole Travis from 1968 to 1977.

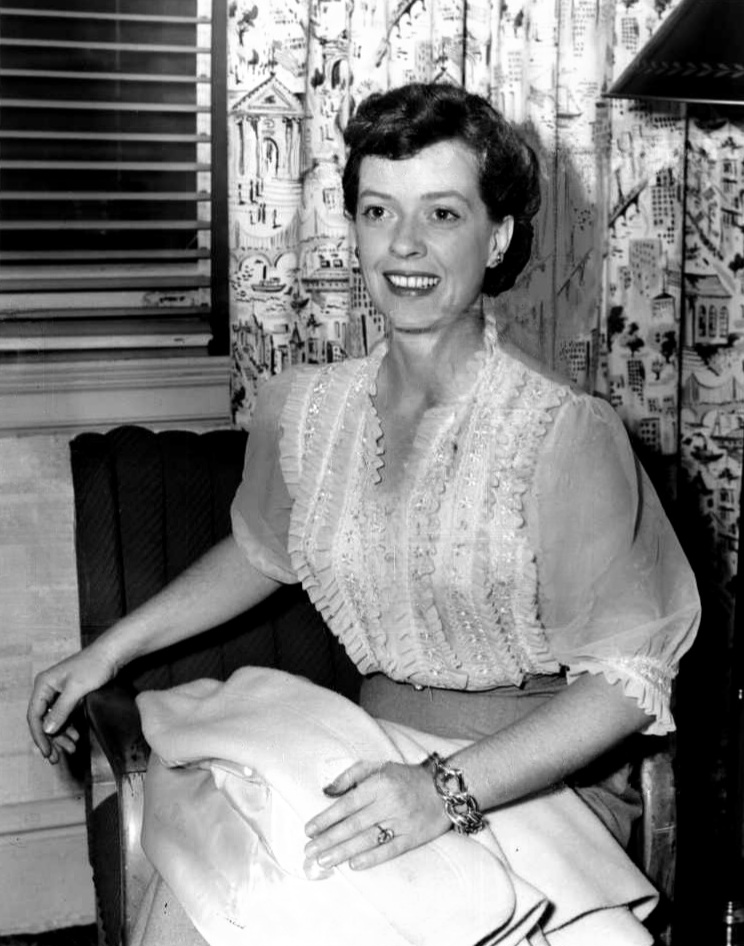
Lois Kibbee portrayed Geraldine Whitney Saxon from 1970 to 1971 and from 1973 to 1984.

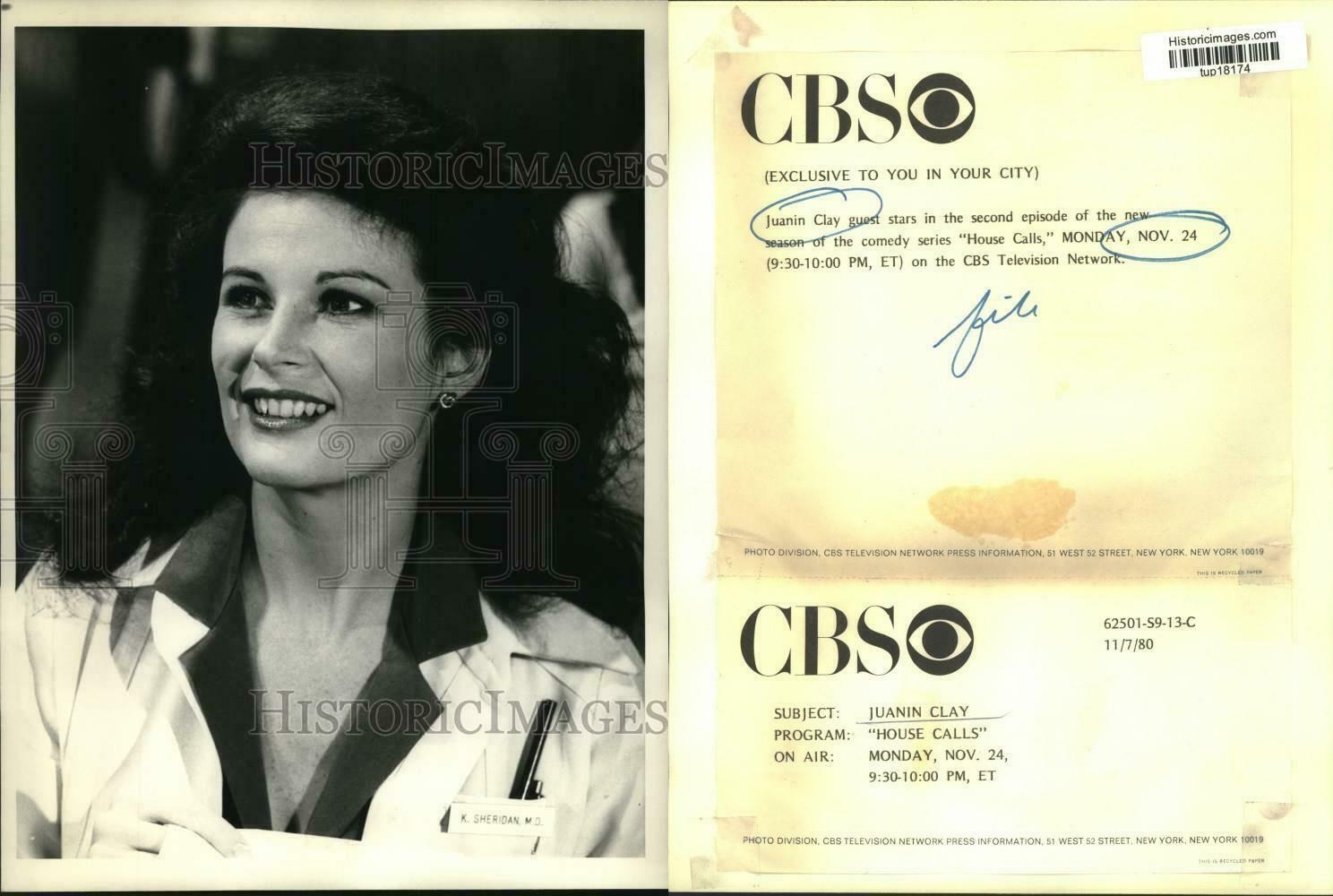
Juanin Clay originated the role of Raven Alexander from 1976 to 1977.

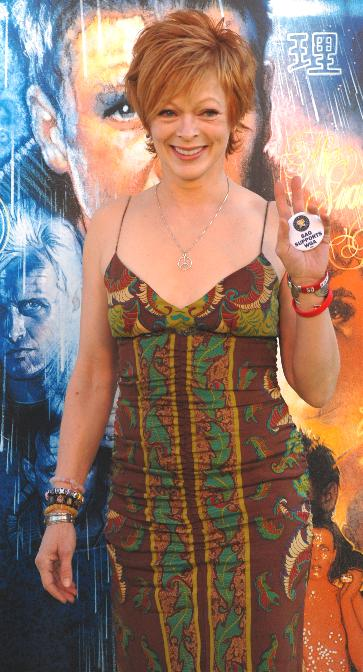
Frances Fisher portrayed Deborah Saxon from 1976 to 1981.

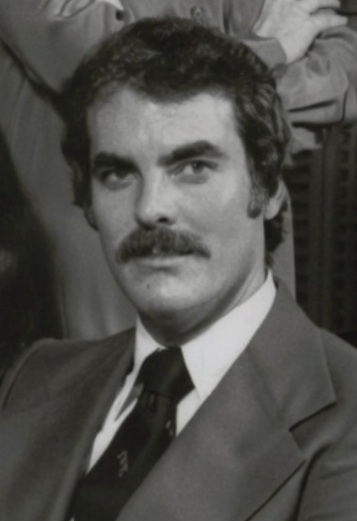
Joel Crothers portrayed Dr. Miles Cavanaugh from 1977 to 1984.

Sharon Gabet portrayed Raven Alexander Whitney from 1977 to 1984.

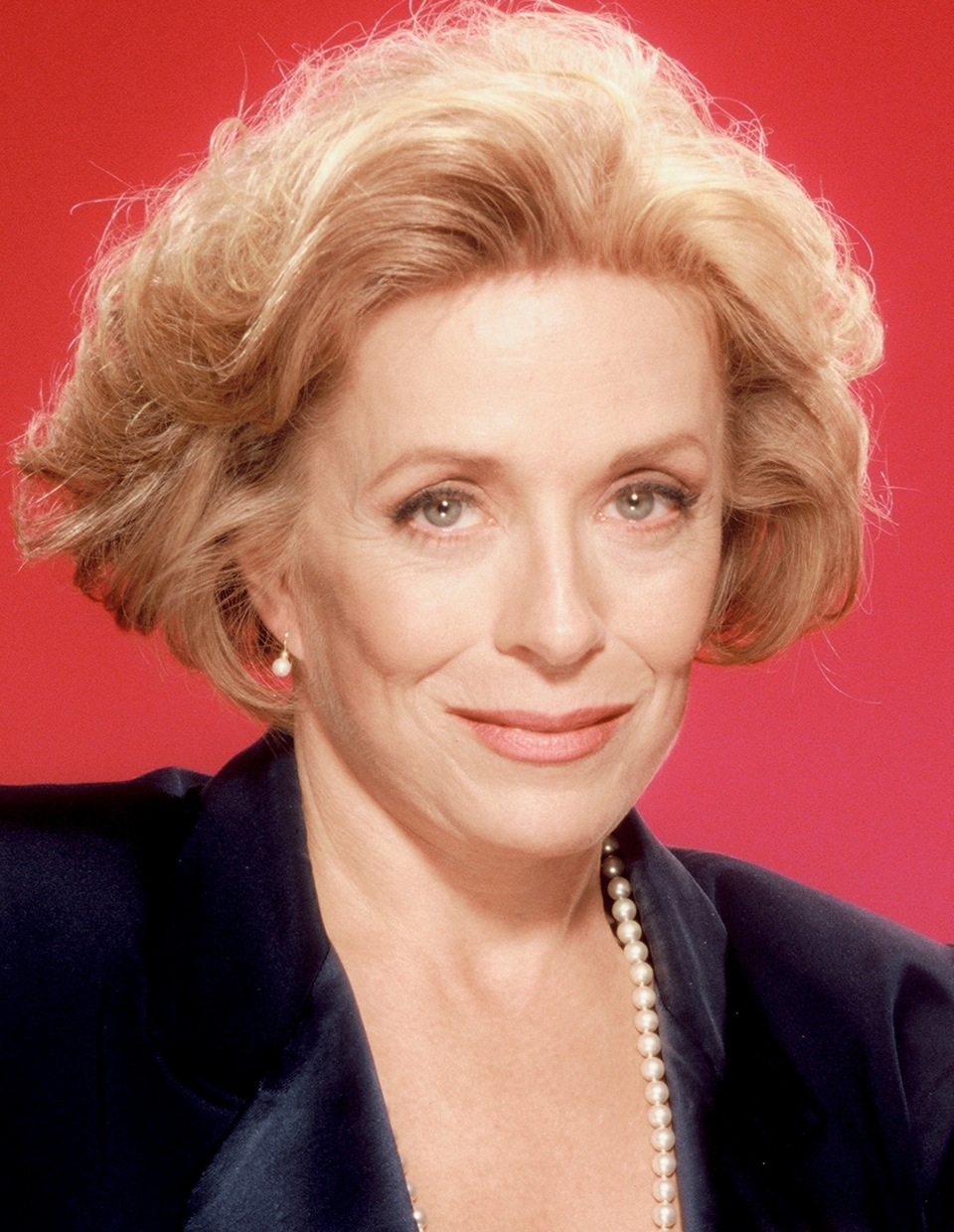
Holland Taylor portrayed Denise Cavanaugh from 1977 to 1978, and in 1980.

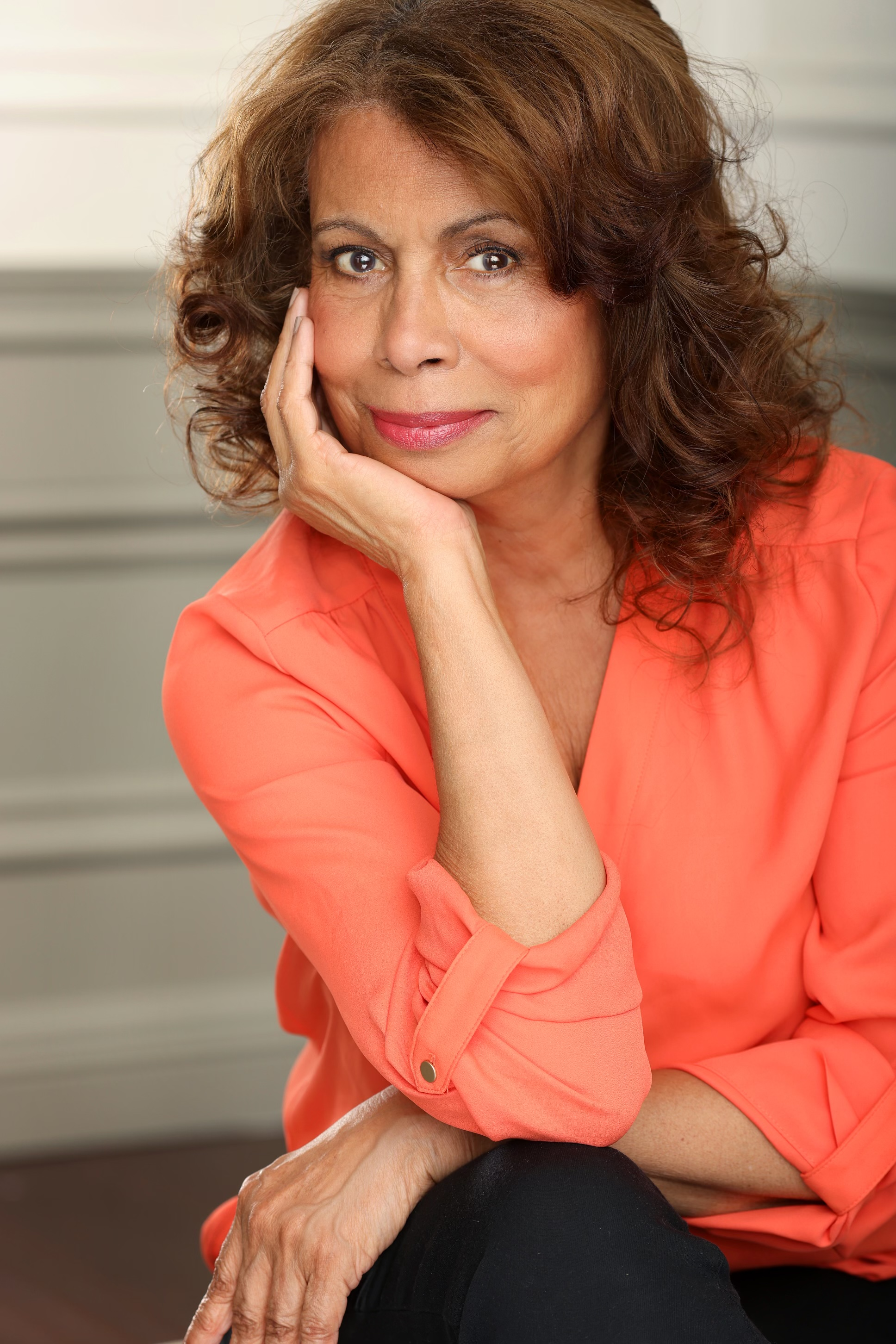
Mariann Aalda portrayed Didi Bannister from 1981 to 1984.

== A ==
=== Nadine Alexander Scott ===
Dorothy Stinnette (1976–1977, 1980)

Nadine is a wealthy socialite, the mother of Raven Alexander (Juanin Clay, Sharon Gabet) and later the wife of Ansel Scott (Patrick Horgan). In 1980, Molly Sherwood (Laurinda Barrett) attempts to murder April Cavanaugh Scott (Terry Davis), the wife of Ansel's son Draper Scott (Tony Craig), but accidentally poisons Nadine, who subsequently crashes her car and dies. Nadine leaves everything to Raven and Logan Swift's (Joe Lambie) son Jamey, so Raven schemes to regain custody of Jamey from Logan.

=== Raven Alexander ===
Juanin Clay (1976–1977); Sharon Gabet (1977–1984)

Monticello socialite Charlotte "Raven" Alexander is married to newspaper reporter Kevin Jamison (John Driver) until his death in a car accident in 1978. She later marries and divorces Logan Swift (Joe Lambie), with whom she has a son, Jamey. In 1980, Molly Sherwood (Laurinda Barrett) attempts to murder April Cavanaugh (Terry Davis), the wife of Raven's stepbrother Draper Scott (Tony Craig), but accidentally poisons Raven's mother, Nadine Alexander Scott (Dorothy Stinnette). Nadine subsequently crashes her car and dies. Nadine leaves everything to her grandson Jamey, so Raven schemes to regain custody of Jamey from Logan. Raven marries dashing millionaire Schuyler Whitney (Larkin Malloy), but in 1982 he is revealed to be impostor Jefferson Brown. Jefferson's attempts to kill her fail, and he is himself killed by Libby Webster (Marion Lines). Raven is a happily wealthy widow after Jefferson’s death, until the real Schuyler arrives to reclaim his fortune. Penniless, she plots to seduce, marry and divorce him for the money. However she soon finds herself having real feelings for him. She and Schuyler have a daughter, Charlotte.

Over the course of the series, Raven has relationships with Draper, his father Ansel Scott (Patrick Horgan), playboy Eliot Dorn (Lee Godart) and Police Chief Derek Mallory (Dennis Parker). She briefly works as a private investigator, is considered a suspect in the deaths of her mother Nadine and later Eliot, is arrested for the murder of Peter Nevis, and goes to trial for the murder of her ex-husband Logan. Initially, wealthy Geraldine Saxon (Lois Kibbee), the close friend of Raven's mother Nadine, refers to Raven as an "alley cat" and "uncouth slut", but the women eventually become close.

Gabet was nominated for a Daytime Emmy Award for Outstanding Lead Actress in a Drama Series in 1982 and 1984.

=== Beth Anderson ===
Nancy Pinkerton (1963–1967)

Beth Moon marries John Paul Anderson (Conard Fowkes) and later John Barnes (Barry Newman), and is engaged to Lee Pollock (Anthony Roberts). She works as a housekeeper for the Capice and Simms families, and is tried but acquitted for the assault of Vera Simms.

=== Trent Archer ===
Farley Granger (1979)

Trent Archer is the superstitious leading man of Mansion of the Damned, a horror film shooting in Monticello which co-stars Nola Madison (Kim Hunter). He quits the movie after accidents, strange occurrences and deaths begin to plague the production.

The role was portrayed from September to October 1979 by film star Granger, who was previously nominated for a Daytime Emmy Award for Outstanding Lead Actor in a Drama Series in 1977 for playing Will Vernon on One Life to Live.

=== Gail Armstrong ===
Millette Alexander (1958–1959)

Gail Armstrong is an artist who works in advertising and portrait painting. Engaged to Dr. Hugh Campbell (Wesley Addy), she is accused but later exonerated of jewelry theft. Gail is the first of three characters played by Millette Alexander on The Edge of Night.

=== Winter Austen ===
Lori Cardille (1978–1979); Stephanie Braxton (1979)

Winter Austen works in a department store and begins dating Assistant District Attorney Logan Swift (Joe Lambie). Wade Meecham (Dan Hamilton) comes to town and blackmails her (and later Logan) with the secret that she had previously been in porn films. Winter goes to work for Nicole Cavanaugh (Jayne Bentzen) at the WMON TV station. She shoots and kills Wade but is found not guilty at trial, and pushes Wade's cohort Tank Jarvis (Michael Longfield) to his death off a building roof. Winter attempts to kill Nicole with a pair of scissors at WMON, but falls to her death from a catwalk.

=== Jinx Avery ===
Kate Capshaw (1981); Susan MacDonald (1981–1982)

Jinx is an actress who marries Monticello Police Chief Derek Mallory (Dennis Parker). She attempts suicide, and later dies from a terminal illness.

== B ==
=== Didi Bannister ===
Mariann Aalda (1981–1984)

Lawyer. Married to Calvin Stoner. Sister of Troy Bannister. Dated Julius Newcombe. Hospitalized for nervous breakdown from plot of Louis Van Dine.

=== Troy Bannister ===
Keith Grant (1982; 1984)

Brother of Didi Bannister. Low level hood associated with Eddie Lorimer. Accused then cleared of murder of Ted Loomis.

=== John Barnes ===
Barry Newman (1964–1967)

John Barnes is a lawyer in Mike Karr's law practice who marries Beth Moon Anderson.

=== Betty Jean Battle ===
Mary Moor (1956–1960)

Married to Jack Lane. Mother of Bud Lane. Daughter of Ella and Wynn Battle.

=== Ursula Bauer ===
Rita Morley (1961–1962)

=== Chip Beemer ===
Kipp Whitman (1978)

Low level criminal in Anthony Saxon's organization. Dated Winter Austen in the past. Stabbed Logan Swift. Shot to death by Raney Cooper.

=== Edith Berman ===
Patricia Bright (1972–1973)

Married to Jake Berman. Mother of Joel Gantry and Lucy Wilson. Murdered by husband Jake.

=== Jake Berman ===
Ward Costello (1972–1973)

Married to Edith Berman. Murdered wife Edith so he would be free to pursue Nicole Travis. Shot in arm by Johnny Dallas to frame Adam Drake with attempted murder. Shot to death by step-son Joel Gantry.

=== Marilyn Bollon ===
Mary Alice Moore (1956–1957)

Secretary for Harry Lane at Lane Trucking. Dated Harry Lane and Douglas Manson. Bludgeoned to death by Harry Lane to stop her blackmail. Cora Lane framed for the murder.

=== Sid Brennan ===
Meg Myles (1981–1982)

Manager of Sid's Tavern. Involved with Eddie Lorimer and left town with him after he reformed.

=== Jefferson Brown ===
Larkin Malloy (1980–1982)

Wealthy playboy Schuyler Whitney comes to Monticello in 1980 and marries socialite Raven Alexander, but is later revealed to be impostor Jefferson Brown, a former government employee who assumed Schuyler's identity after undergoing plastic surgery at Dr. Kenneth Bryson's clinic. He hires Romeo Slade to kill Raven, but changes his mind and shoots Slade to death. Jefferson murders his minion Gunther Wagner and frames Gavin Wylie for the crime. He kills Bobbie Gerard and attempts to kill Raven multiple times in St. Moritz, but is killed by Libby Webster before he can succeed.

=== Willie Bryan ===
Edward Holmes (1957–1960)

Private investigator working with Mike Karr.

=== Maximillian Bryer ===
Robert Pastene (1958–1959)

Motivational speaker and head of Bryer Foundation. Married to Mildred Bryer. Pushed Peggy Collins to her death from a rooftop. Used poison to murder wife Mildred and framed step brother-in-law Dr. Hugh Campbell. Arrested and jailed from crimes.

=== Mildred Bryer ===
Claudia Morgan (1958–1959)

Wife of Maximillian Bryer. Stepsister of Dr. Hugh Campbell. Poisoned to death by husband Max.

=== Beth Bryson ===
Doris Belack (1981–1982)

Wife of Dr. Kenneth Bryson. Stepmother of Valerie Bryson. Nurse at the Rexford Institute. Kidnapped Nancy Karr. Arrested and sent to prison.

=== Kenneth Bryson ===
James Hawthorne (1981–1982)

Dr. Kenneth Bryson is the owner of Rexford Institute, married to nurse Beth Bryson and the father of Valerie Bryson. He goes along with his wife's kidnapping of Nancy Karr, but falls in love with her. He is subsequently arrested and sent to prison, where he dies of a heart attack.

=== Valerie Bryson ===
Leah Ayres (1981–1983)

Photographer. Daughter of Kenneth Bryson. Stepdaughter of Beth Bryson. Helped expose her father's crimes. Involved with Kelly McGrath and Schuyler Whitney

== C ==
=== Abby Cameron ===
Margaret DePriest (1965–1966)

Wife of Roy Cameron. Had affair with Phil Capice. Suspect in husband's murder but cleared.

=== David Cameron ===
Norman Parker (1982–1983)

Agent for intelligence agency working as double agent. Killed Pascal, Nora Fulton, Patricia Devereaux, and Richard Scanlon. Electrocuted to death by Ian Devereaux.

=== Hugh Campbell ===
Wesley Addy (1958–1959)

Dr. Hugh Campbell is a scientist at Winston Grimsley's lab who is framed for the murder of his sister Mildred Campbell. He is acquitted, and marries Gail Armstrong.

=== Phil Capice ===
Earl Hammond (1957); Robert Webber (1957); Ray MacDonnell (1961–1969)

Married to Louise Capice. Adoptive father of Sarah Louise Capice. Had affair with Abby Cameron which ended his marriage. Drugged by Calvin Brenner.

=== Sarah Louise Capice ===
Mary Breen (1961–1963); Christopher Norris (1968–1970)

Adopted daughter of Phil and Louise Capice. Dated Calvin Brenner who was really drugging her father.

=== Jennings Carlson ===
Jeff Harris (1960)

Brother of Victor Carlson. Ran gambling operation with brother. Shot to death by Monticello police.

=== Victor Carlson ===
Charles Baxter (1960); Byson Sanders (1960–1961)

Brother of Jennings Carlson. Ran gambling operation with brother. Had affair with Teresa Vetter and plotted to murder her husband George. Engaged to Judy Marceau. Stabbed to death by Teresa Vetter.

=== April Cavanaugh Scott ===
Terry Davis (1977–1981)

Married to Draper Scott. Mother of Julia Scott and unnamed daughter. Daughter of Margo Huntington. Sister of Miles Cavanaugh. Worked at WMON TV. Falsely convicted of murder of sister-in-law Denise Cavanaugh.

=== Denise Cavanaugh ===
Holland Taylor (1977–1978, 1980)

Nurse Denise Norwood Cavanaugh is the jealous wife of Dr. Miles Cavanaugh. Their marriage is in shambles and he is attracted to reporter Nicole Drake, so Denise plots to kill herself and frame Miles. His sister April is arrested instead. Denise's father, Dr. Gus Norwood, confesses on his deathbed that he injected Denise to save Miles.

=== Miles Cavanaugh ===
Joel Crothers (1977–1984)

Dr. Miles Cavanaugh is married to nurse Denise Norwood Cavanaugh until she dies in a mercy killing by her father Dr. Gus Norwood. Miles next marries Nicole Travis until she is murdered in 1983. He and Beth Correll marry in the last episode of the series. Miles's sister is April Cavanaugh.

Crothers was nominated for a Daytime Emmy Award for Outstanding Lead Actor in a Drama Series in 1979 and 1984.

=== Luke Chandler ===
Herb Davis (1973–1978)

Police lieutenant. Married to Ada Chandler.

=== Ron Christopher ===
Burt Douglas (1968–1972)

Worked in advertising. Married then divorced then remarried Cookie Pollock. Had affair with Tiffany Whitney.

=== Harry Constable ===
Dolph Sweet (1967–1968)

Owner of Riverboat Casino. Had affair with Ruth Tuttle. Stabbed to death by Ernie Tuttle.

=== Raney Cooper ===
Kiel Martin (1977–1978)

Criminal. Worked with Tony Saxon. Blinded Mike Karr and framed Chip Beemer. Kidnapped Mike Karr. Kidnapped Deborah Saxon. Shot Tony Saxon to death. Killed in shoutout with police.

=== Beth Correll ===
Sandy Faison (1983–1984)

Psychiatrist and radio host. Married to Dr. Miles Cavanaugh. Sister of Liz Corell.

=== Liz Correll ===
Marcia Cross (1984)

Paleontologist. Sister of Beth Correll. Involved with Preacher Emerson.

== D ==
=== Johnny Dallas ===
John LaGoia (1972–1977)

Owner of restaurant The New Moon Cafe. Married to Laurie Ann Karr. Father of John Victor Dallas. Left town with son after Laurie Ann had mental breakdown.

=== Tracy Dallas ===
Patricia Conwell (1974–1977)

=== Peter Dalton ===
Stephen Elliott (1957–1958)

=== Virginia Dalton ===
Cathleen Cordell (1957–1958)

=== Neil Davenport ===
Earle Hyman (1970–1971)

Campaign manager for Colin Whitney's Senate campaign. Assisted Adam Drake in investigating the presumed dead Keith Whitney. Killed after being knocked unconscious by Keith Whitney, placed in car, and pushed over a cliff.

=== Camilla Devereaux ===
Mary Layne (1982–1983)

Sister of Ian Devereaux. Involved with Gavin Wylie and Spencer Varney. Worked with Spencer Varney to steal Sky Whitney's fortune and left town.

=== Ian Devereaux ===
Alan Coates (1982–1983)

Spy. Married and divorced Patricia Devereaux. Illegal marriage to Raven Alexander. Caused David Cameron's death by electrocution and then fled the country.

=== Patricia Devereaux ===
Caroline Lagerfelt (1983)

Married and divorced Ian Deveraux. Stole secret documents from Ian. Strangled to death by David Cameron.

=== Joey Dials ===
Joey Jerome (1979)

Teenaged criminal. Brother of Mickey Dials. Shot to death by police officer Steve Guthrie.

=== Mickey Dials ===
Vasili Bogazianos (1979)

Bartender at The Unicorn. Leader of crime ring. Attempted to kill Paige Madison. Kidnapped Miles Cavanaugh. Fell to death through window while being chased by Steve Guthrie.

=== Jim Diedrikson ===
David Allen Brooks (1981–1982)

=== Eliot Dorn ===
Lee Godart (1978–1980)

Eliot is a deceitful younger man who marries haughty newscaster Margo Huntington. The marriage ends contentiously, and he implicates Margo in the murder of Wade Meecham and blackmails his ex-lover, Raven Alexander. Eliot becomes romantically involved with possessive Hollywood actress Nola Madison. Margo is bludgeoned to death, and her son-in-law Draper Scott is convicted of her murder. The killer is later revealed to be Nola, who murdered Margo in a jealous rage because she refused to divorce Eliot. As the owner of the Unicorn Bar, Eliot sexually harasses young waitress Jody Travis, and is subsequently stabbed in the back and killed by a mysterious assailant wielding a clown puppet. Suspects in the murder include Raven and puppeteer Kelly McGrath, but the killer also stabs Cliff Nelson and stalks Raven. The Clown Puppet Killer is revealed to be Molly Sherwood, who wanted to silence Eliot to cover up her murder of Nadine Alexander.

=== Noel Douglas ===
Thom Christopher (1974–1975); Dick Latessa (1975–1976)

Con man. Married and divorced from Tiffany Whitney. Involved with Brandy Henderson and Tracy Dallas. Bludgeoned Geraldine Whitney and later disconnected her respirator in the hospital. Suspect in the death of Tiffany Whitney but he had already left Monticello.

=== Adam Drake ===
Donald May (1967–1977)

Lawyer Adam Drake is Mike Karr's law partner who defends Nicole Travis against charges of murder. He falls in love with her and they marry. Over time he is also involved with Brandy Henderson, Cookie Pollock Thomas, and Roxanne Carey. Adam is framed for the murder of Jake Berman. He survives multiple attempts on his life by Walter Lepage while Adam is running for the Senate, and is shot by Van Rydell. Adam is shot to death by criminal underworld figure Raymond Harper, aka Colonel Blood, in 1977.

=== Frank Dubeck ===
Michael Conrad (1959–1960)

Criminal. Strangled Ruth Hakim to death and framed Jack Lane for the murder. Fell to death from airplane while struggling with Mike Karr.

=== Martine Duval ===
Sonia Petrovna (1980–1981)

Professional dancer. Involved with Schuyler Whitney/Jefferson Brown and Gavin Wylie. Attempted suicide by jumping off bridge. Married Carlo Crown and left Monticello.

== E ==
=== Chris Egan ===
Jennifer Joan Taylor (1983–1984)

Police detective. Mother of Matthew Gantz. Divorced from Walter Gantz. Daughter of Mark and Caroline Egan. Involved with Miles Cavanaugh and Derek Mallory. Shot and blinded.

=== Del Emerson ===
Robert Gerringer (1983–1984)

Del is the father of John "Preacher" Emerson who is engaged to be married to Geraldine Whitney.

=== Preacher Emerson ===
Charles Flohe (1982–1984)

John "Preacher" Emerson manages the Video Disco and works at WEON radio. He is the son of Del Emerson, and is a suspect in the beating of Barbara Montgomery and the murder of Nora Fulton. Preacher falls in love with Jodie Travis, but ultimately leaves town with Liz Corell.

=== Dwight Endicott ===
Alfred Drake (1982)

Owner of Endicott Art Gallery and importer of illegal art. Father of Grace Endicott. Responsible for death of Leonie Travis. Kidnapped Jody Travis.

=== Grace Endicott ===
Ellen Tobie (1982)

Worked at Endicott Art Gallery. Daughter of Dwight Endicott.

== F ==
=== Paul Fairchild ===
Sam Schnacht (1974–1975)

Attorney. Assisted Morlock Sevigny in plot to extort money from Bill and Martha Marceau over adoption of Jennifer Sims. Assisted Morlock Sevigny in framing Martha Marceau for the murder of Taffy Sims.

=== Mark Faraday ===
Bernie McInerney (1975)

Mark Faraday is a publisher who comes to Monticello in 1975 with his wife, Serena, and their son, Timmy. Serena suffers from multiple personality disorder, and Mark sues her for custody of Timmy when they separate. Serena's alternate personality, Josie, shoots Mark to death on the steps of the Monticello courthouse.

=== Serena Faraday ===
Louise Shaffer (1975–1976)

Serena Faraday, the cousin of Nicole Travis, comes to town in 1975 with her publisher husband Mark Faraday their son, Timmy. Serena suffers from multiple personality disorder, with an alter named "Josie", for which she is treated by Dr. Quentin Henderson. She and Mark fight for custody of Timmy, which results in Josie shooting Mark to death. Serena is committed to a sanitarium, where she later dies.

=== Timmy Faraday ===
Doug McKeon (1975–1978)

Timmy Faraday is the son of publisher Mark Faraday and his wife Serena. After his mother shoots his father to death, Timmy is taken in by Mike and Nancy Karr. Serena's sister Josephine Harper claims custody, but Timmy is later returned to the Karrs. He is sent away to summer camp in 1978, and never returns to Monticello.

=== Jim Fields ===
Alan Feinstein (1969–1975)

Psychiatrist. Married to Liz Hillyer. Father of Jason Fields. Involved with Rosella Gray. Arrested and later exonerated in the stabbing death of Rosella Gray. Left Monticello for job in Canada and to rekindle strained marriage with Liz.

=== Shelley Franklyn ===
Pamela Shoemaker (1983–1984)

=== Nora Fulton ===
Catherine Bruno (1981–1983)

Murdered by David Cameron.

== G ==
=== Joel Gantry ===
Paul Henry Itkin (1973); Nicholas Pryor (1973–1974)

Private detective. Son of Edith Berman. Step-son of Jake Berman. Brother of Lucy Wilson. Murdered Jake Berman and framed Adam Drake for the crime. Arrested and admitted to the crime.

=== Walter Gantz ===
John Bedford Lloyd (1983)

Ex-husband of Chris Egan and father of Matthew Gantz.

=== Emily Gault ===
Margo McKenna (1980–1981)

Daughter of Leo Gault. Widow of Kirk Michaels. Attempted suicide and sent to sanitarium. Involved with Matt Sharkey. Became pregnant and tried to convince Draper Scott that he was the father. Left town when true paternity was discovered.

=== Leo Gault ===
George D. Wallace (1980)

Doctor. Father of Emily Gault. Kept Draper Scott's true identity a secret when he had amnesia to help Emily. Died from a heart attack.

=== Johnny Gentry ===
Craig Augustine (1981–1982)

=== Bobbie Gerard ===
Mady Kaplan (1981)

Waitress at Sid's Tavern. Briefly worked as housekeeper in Whitney mansion. Helped clear Gavin Wylie in murder of Gunther Wagner. Murdered by Jefferson Brown while he was pretending to be Schuyler Whitney.

=== Ed Gibson ===
Larry Hagman (1961–1963)

Police officer and later lawyer. Married to Judith Marceau. Brother of Marjory Gibson. Shot. Vanished from Monticello.

=== David Gideon ===
John Cullum (1966–1967); Byron Sanders (1967)

=== Sybil Gordon ===
Priscilla Gillette (1957–1958)

Secretary for Mike Karr. Secretly working for criminal J.H. Phillips. Claimed affair with Mike Karr to discredit him. Strangled to death by Ollie, a cohort of J.H. Phillips.

=== Rosella Gray ===
Carol Richards (1970–1971)

Involved with Dr. Jim Fields. Stabbed to death by Keith Whitney while waiting in Jim Fields' bed in attempt to seduce him.

=== Lloyd Griffin ===
James Mitchell (1964)

Police captain. Married to Katie Griffin. Provided information to criminal Otto Zimmerman. Killed in shootout with police chief Bill Marceau.

=== Louise Grimsley ===
Lisa Howard (1956–1961); Mary K. Wells (1961–1970)

Married and divorced from Phil Capice. Adoptive mother of Sarah Louise Capice. Daughter of Winston Grimsley. Step-daughter of Mattie Lane Grimsley.

=== Winston Grimsley ===
Walter Greaza (1956–1973)

Financier. Widower from first wife. Married to Mattie Lane. Father of Louise Grimsley Capice. Adoptive grandfather of Sarah Louise Capice. Step-father of Sarah Lane and Jack Lane. Arrested and tried for the murder of Lyn Wilkens Warren who was blackmailing him.

=== Steve Guthrie ===
Denny Albee (1976–1980)

Police detective. Involved with Deborah Saxon. Bodyguard for Nicole Travis and Paige Madison. Suspended from police after he shot Joey Dials to death. Moved to Arizona.

== H ==
=== Ruth Hakim ===
Ann Jones (1960)

Secretary to Jack Lane who tried to seduce him and steal him away from his wife. Strangled to death by Frank Dubeck.

=== Mark Hamilton ===
Christopher Holder (1984)

Shot by Schuyler Whitney and arrested.

=== Robbie Hamlin ===
Willie Aames (1983)

=== Davey Hansen ===
Ben Hayes (1964)

=== Josephine Harper ===
Judith McGilligan (1976–1977)

Wife of Raymond Harper. Sister of Serena Faraday. Aunt of Timmy Faraday.

=== Raymond Harper ===
Dick Callinan (1976)

Crimelord. Alias is Colonel Blood. Husband of Josephine Harper. Murdered Beau Richardson and Adam Drake. Blackmailed Nancy Karr. Threatened life of nephew Timmy Faraday. Arrested for crimes.

=== Doug Hastings ===
Hal Studer (1968–1969)

=== Benny Hayes ===
Bennett Cooperman (1979–1980)

Drug dealer and criminal. Sold drugs to Nola Madison. Hired someone to kidnap and murder Deborah Saxon. Attempted to rape Nancy Karr in his father's flower shop and arrested for this assault.

=== Brandy Henderson ===
Dixie Carter (1974–1976)

Assistant district attorney Olivia Brandeis "Brandy" Henderson is the sister of Dr. Quentin Henderson. She is romantically involved with Adam Drake and Draper Scott.

=== Quentin Henderson ===
Michael Stroka (1975–1976)

Psychiatrist who treated Serena Faraday. Brother of Brandy Henderson. Bludgeoned to death by Clay Jordan.

=== Donald Hext ===
Ralph Byers (1983, 1984)

Security manager of the Isis Building and criminal associate of Louis Van Dine. Attempted to kill Schuyler Whitney. Firebombed the Video Disco. Kidnapped Cliff Nelson and Mitzi Martin. Stabbed to death in duel with Schuyler Whitney but appeared alive in last episode of series.

=== Laura Hillyer ===
Millette Alexander (1965–1967)

Socialite. Married to Orin Hillyer. Step-mother of Liz Hillyer. Had affair with Rick Oliver who she shot to death and allowed Martha Marceau to stand trial for the murder. Drive car off cliff while fleeing police. This is the second of Alexander's roles on the show.

=== Liz Hillyer ===
Alberta Grant (1965–1974)

Married to Steve Prentiss and Dr. Jim Fields. Mother of Jason Fields. Daughter of Orin Hillyer. Step-daughter of Laura Hillyer, Julie Jamison, and Angela Morgan. Injured in a car crash while pregnant. Hypnotized by Elly Jo Jamison as part of a murder plot.

=== Orin Hillyer ===
Lester Rawlins (1965–1968; 1972–1973)

Businessman. Husband of Laura Hillyer, Julie Jamison, Angela Morgan, and an unnamed first wife. Father of Liz Hillyer. Grandfather of Jason Fields. Injured in plane crash that killed wife Julie. Survived a heart attack after witnessing Elly Jo Jamison in a romantic situation with his chauffeur Leonard James. .

=== Tango Humphries ===
Dorrie Kavanaugh (1970); Lynn Ann Leveridge (1970–1971)

=== Margo Huntington ===
Ann Williams (1978–1980)

In September 1978, newscaster Margo Huntington comes to Monticello with her manager Wade Meecham (Dan Hamilton) and buys the WMON television station. She takes an immediate liking to Dr. Miles Cavanaugh (Joel Crothers), who is married to Nicole Cavanaugh (Jayne Bentzen), a reporter at the station. Revealing herself as Miles' sister April Cavanaugh Scott's (Terry Davis) biological mother, Margo attempts to broker a baby when April is unable to have one of her own, and interferes with a job offer made to April's husband Draper Scott (Tony Craig) that would move the couple out of town. Margo marries Eliot Dorn (Lee Godart), a deceitful younger man, but the marriage ends contentiously. A vengeful Margo refuses to give Eliot his freedom by divorcing him. Draper finds Margo bludgeoned in her apartment, and she dies in the hospital before she can exonerate him. Draper is convicted of murder. The actual killer turns out to be possessive movie star Nola Madison (Kim Hunter), who had started a relationship with Eliot and was furious that Margo would not divorce him.

== J ==
=== Elly Jo Jamison ===
Dorothy Lyman (1972–1973)

Sister of Kevin Jamison. Niece of Julie Jamson Hillyer. Moved to Monticello to help Orin Hillyer after the death of his wife Julie. Began affair Hillyer family chauffeur Leonard James. Plotted with Simon Jessup to kill Liz Hillyer by engineering a fall down the stairs and later having Jessup hypnotize Liz to instigate a car crash. Died from wounds sustained after she jumped from a speeding car.

=== Julie Jamison ===
Millette Alexander (1967–1968)

Aunt of Kevin and Ely Jo Jamison who marries Orin Hillyer. She is later killed in a plane crash.

=== Kevin Jamison ===
Dick Shoberg (1972–1975); John Driver (1975–1978)

Newspaper reporter and potential Congressman. Married to Phoebe Smith. Married to Raven Alexander until his death in a car accident in 1978. Brother of Elly Jo Jamison. Nephew of Julie Jamison Hillyer.

=== Phoebe Smith Jamison ===
Heidi Vaughn (1965–1967); Renne Jarrett (1967–1968); Laurie Kennedy (1972); Johanna Leister (1972–1976)

Dr. Phoebe Smith Jamison is the first wife of Keith Jamison.

=== Tank Jarvis ===
Michael Longfield (1978–1979)

Ex-con. Video editor at WMON. Suspect in the murder of Wade Meacham. Fell to his death from the roof of an apartment building after Winter Austen pried his fingers from the ledge.

=== Simon Jessup ===
Hugh Reilly (1971–1973)

=== Austin Johnson ===
Lawrence Weber (1961–1963)

=== Constance Johnson ===
Elizabeth Lawrence (1961–1963)

=== Inez Johnson ===
Gwynn Press (1977–1978)

Prostitute. Witness to the murder of Beau Richardson who thought the shooter was Mike Karr.

=== Poppy Johnson ===
Karen Needle (1982–1983)

Secretary and associate of Eddie Lorimer. Dated Damian Tyler.

=== Walt Johnson ===
Mark Rydell (1956)

=== Clay Jordan ===
Niles McMaster (1976–1977)

Criminal posing as a doctor. Killed Dr. Quentin Henderson and Van Rydell. Attempted to poison Phoebe Smith. Associate of Claude Revenant. Kidnapped and attempted to poison Nicole Drake.

== K ==
=== Laurie Ann Karr ===
Kathleen Cody (1966–1968); Emily Prager (1968–1972); Jeanne Ruskin (1973–1975); Linda Cook (1975–77, 1984)

Laurie Ann Karr is the daughter of lawyer Mike Karr and his wife Sara. As an adult, she marries Vic Lamont and Johnny Dallas.

=== Mike Karr ===
John Larkin (1956–1962); Laurence Hugo (1962–1971); Forrest Compton (1971–1984)

Original lead character Mike Karr is a police officer turned lawyer who rises to eventually become the District Attorney of Monticello. Based on the earlier Perry Mason on radio (who was voiced by Larkin), Mike is initially married to Sara Lane, but is widowed in 1961 and marries Nancy Pollack in 1963.

=== Nancy Karr ===
Ann Flood (1962–1984)

Nancy Pollock is a newspaper reporter for The Monticello News who marries widowed lawyer Mike Karr in 1963. She later becomes a television newscaster and novelist.

=== Sara Lane Karr ===
Teal Ames (1956–1961)

Sara Lane Karr is the first wife of lawyer Mike Karr and mother to their daughter Laurie. She is killed in 1961, pushing Laurie out of the way of an oncoming car.

When Ames chose to leave the show, writer Carl Bixby decided to kill off the character rather than recast such an identifiable role. Fans were shocked, tying up the CBS switchboard and sending 8,000 letters and telegrams. The next day, the network put Ames on air to explain that she chose to leave The Edge of Night to pursue other projects.

== L ==
=== Jack Lane ===
Don Hastings (1956–1960)

Jack Lane is the brother of Sara Lane Karr whose mob ties create problems for his brother-in-law, Assistant District Attorney Mike Karr.

== M ==
=== Brian Madison ===
Stephen McNaughton (1979)

Brian, the son of movie producer Owen Madison and actress Nola Madison, is in love with his half sister Paige. Eventually it is revealed that Brian's father is movie producer Eddie Vaughn, and not Owen, freeing him and Paige to be together.

=== Nola Madison ===
Kim Hunter (1979–1980)

Fading movie star Nola Patterson Madison comes to Monticello with her producer husband Owen and adult children Paige and Brian to film the horror movie Mansion of the Damned. Troubled by alcoholism, Nola obsesses about Owen's infatuation with police detective Deborah Saxon. The movie set is plagued by accidents, strange occurrences and the deaths of the director and publicist. Disguised as a strange old woman named Martha Cory, Nola stalks Deborah and sends her poisoned candy, and drugs and gaslights Dr. Miles Cavanaugh. Nola's son Brian and stepdaughter Paige are tortured by their secret love for each other, and the revelation that Brian is not Owen's son clears the way for him to be with Paige. Nola becomes romantically involved with manipulative playboy Eliot Dorn, who is going through a messy divorce from newscaster Margo Huntington. Margo is bludgeoned to death, and her son-in-law Draper Scott is convicted. Deborah later finds Margo's wig among Nola's belongings, and confronts her. Nola unravels, and confesses that she killed Margo in an unplanned, jealous rage because Margo would not divorce Eliot. Nola then seized the opportunity to frame Draper. Owen and Detective Steve Guthrie escort Nola to the police station.

Hunter was nominated for a Daytime Emmy Award for Outstanding Lead Actress in a Drama Series in 1980 for her portrayal of Nola. Judith Light won that year for portraying housewife-turned-hooker Karen Wolek on the ABC soap opera One Life to Live.

=== Owen Madison ===
Bruce Gray (1979–1980)

Owen is a movie producer married to actress Nola Madison, a fading star troubled by alcoholism. He brings his family to Monticello to film Mansion of the Damned and quickly falls in love with police detective Deborah Saxon.

=== Paige Madison ===
Margaret Colin (1979)

Paige, the daughter of movie producer Owen Madison and stepdaughter to his wife, actress Nola Madison, is in love with her half brother Brian. Eventually it is revealed that Brian's father is movie producer Eddie Vaughn, and not Owen, freeing him and Paige to be together.

=== Derek Mallory ===
Dennis Parker (1979–1984)

Monticello Chief of Police Derek Mallory has a fling with Raven Alexander.

=== Martha Marceau ===
Teri Keane (1964–1975)

Martha Spears Marceau is the wife of Police Chief Bill Marceau. Morlock Sevigny and Mark Fairchild plot to extort money from Bill and Martha Marceau over the adoption of Jennifer Sims, and frame Martha for the murder of Taffy Sims.

=== Bill Marceau ===
Mandel Kramer (1959–1979)

Monticello Police Chief Bill Marceau and his wife Martha are extorted over the adoption of Jennifer Sims.

Kramer was nominated for a Daytime Emmy Award for Outstanding Supporting Actor in a Drama Series in 1979.

=== Kelly McGrath ===
Allen Fawcett (1980–1982)

Nephew of Nancy Pollock Karr. Puppeteer falsely suspected of the Hand Puppet Murders.

=== Wade Meecham ===
Dan Hamilton (1978–1979)

== N ==
=== Cliff Nelson ===
Ernie Townsend (1979–1984)

== P ==
=== Cookie Pollock ===
June Carter (1962); Fran Sharon (1962–1972)

Elaine "Cookie" Pollock Thomas Christopher is the daughter of Joe and Rose Pollock, and sister of Lee Pollock and Nancy Pollock Karr.

=== Joe Pollock ===
John Gibson (1962–1971); Allen Nourse (1973–1979)

Joe and Rose Pollock are the parents of Lee, Nancy and Cookie Pollock.

=== Lee Pollock ===
Ronnie Welch (1962–1964); Sam Groom (1964); Anthony Roberts (1965–1967)

Lee Pollock is the son of Joe and Rose Pollock, and brother of Nancy Pollock Karr and Cookie Pollock.

=== Rose Pollock ===
Ruth Matteson (1962–1963); Frances Reid (1964); Kay Campbell (1965–1968); Virginia Kaye (1973–1979)

Joe and Rose Pollock are the parents of Lee, Nancy and Cookie Pollock.

== S ==
=== Deborah Saxon ===
Frances Fisher (1976–1981)

Detective Deborah "Red" Saxon is the daughter of mobster Tony Saxon. She is convinced that Raven Alexander murdered Eliot Dorn, but when the killer is revealed to be Molly Sherwood, Deborah turns in her badge and leaves town.

=== Ansel Scott ===
Patrick Horgan (1976–1977)

Ansel, the father of Draper Scott, marries Nadine Alexander.

=== Draper Scott ===
Tony Craig (1975–1981)

Assistant District Attorney Draper Scott has a relationship with colleague Brandy Henderson, then his step-sister Raven Alexander, and ultimately marries April Cavanaugh. He is wrongly convicted of the murder of his mother-in-law, Margo Huntington, and is subsequently presumed dead when the train transporting him to prison crashes. At the same time, Deborah Saxon elicits a confession from movie star Nola Madison that she killed Margo. Draper survives the crash but suffers from amnesia, and is cared for by Dr. Leo Gault and his fragile daughter, Emily. Dr. Gault keeps Draper's identity a secret because Emily has grown attached to him. The Gaults' housekeeper, Molly Sherwood, schemes to keep Draper and April apart for Emily's sake.

=== Molly Sherwood ===
Jane Hoffman (1980); Laurinda Barrett (1980–1981)

Molly Sherwood is the housekeeper for Dr. Leo Gault and his daughter Emily, and later works for April Scott. Molly wants Draper to be with Emily and attempts to kill April, but Nadine Alexander Scott, Raven Alexander's mother, is accidentally killed instead. The Clown Puppet Killer murders Eliot Dorn and stabs Cliff Nelson, and puppeteer Kelly McGrath is framed for the killings. The real culprit is revealed to be Molly, who killed Eliot to cover up Nadine's death. She kidnaps April and believes she has shot Raven to death, but the gun is loaded with blanks. Molly holds April hostage in a basement and prepares to kill her, but Raven appears at the door, and the shock causes Molly to fall down the stairs to her death.

=== Calvin Stoner ===
Irving Allen Lee (1977–1984)

Detective Calvin Stoner works closely with Monticello Police Chief Derek Mallory, and marries lawyer Didi Bannister.

=== Logan Swift ===
Joe Lambie (1977–1981); Tom Tammi (1984)

Assistant District Attorney Logan Swift marries Raven Alexander, and they later have a son, Jamey. Raven is later put on trial for his murder, but it turns out that Geraldine shot him, thinking he was an intruder.

== T ==
=== Jody Travis ===
Lori Loughlin (1980–1983); Karrie Emerson (1984)

Jody is the younger sister of Nicole Travis who becomes romantically involved with Gavin Wylie and Preacher Emerson.

=== Nicole Travis ===
Maeve McGuire (1968–1977); Jayne Bentzen (1978–1981); Lisa Sloan (1981–1983)

Nicole Travis Stewart Drake Cavanaugh is the shopkeeper daughter of gangster Ben Travis, who finds herself implicated in the murder of Stefanie Martin. She falls in love with her defense attorney Adam Drake and marries him, later marrying Dr. Miles Cavanaugh. In 1983, Nicole is murdered with poisoned makeup by criminal mastermind Louis Van Dine.

== V ==
=== Eddie Vaughn ===
Stratton Walling (1979)

Eddie Vaughn is Nola Madison's ex-lover, who helps her stage accidents and strange occurrences on the set of her film as a publicity stunt. He is trapped in a fire set by Nola, and later dies of his injuries. His will reveals that he is the father of Nola's son Brian, not her husband Owen.

== W ==
=== Gunther Wagner ===
David Froman (1980–1984)

Gunther is the loyal manservant and bodyguard to millionaire Schuyler Whitney. In 1982, it is revealed that Gunther is actually his twin brother Bruno, and that Schuyler is an impostor named Jefferson Brown. The real Gunther and Schuyler come to Monticello and remain until the series finale in 1984.

=== Colin Whitney ===
Anthony Call (1970–1971)

Senator Colin Whitney is the elder son of Gordon and Geraldine Whitney, and is married to Tiffany Whitney.

=== Geraldine Whitney Saxon ===
Lois Kibbee (1970–1971, 1973–1984)

Geraldine is the widow of Democratic senator and presidential hopeful Gordon Whitney and later of mobster Tony Saxon. She is mother to Colin Whitney and his younger brother Keith, who is eventually revealed to be a serial killer. Geraldine's plea for Keith to stop his killing spree results in his fatal fall down the stairs of a lighthouse. At first Geraldine considers Raven Alexander, the daughter of her close friend Nadine, an "alley cat" and "uncouth slut", but eventually the women become close.

Kibbee was nominated for a Daytime Emmy Award for Outstanding Supporting Actress in a Drama Series in 1979, 1980, 1981 and 1984.

=== Gordon Whitney ===
Alan Gifford (1970–1971)

Senator Gordon Whitney is married to Geraldine Whitney, and is the father of Colin and Keith Whitney.

=== Keith Whitney ===
Bruce Martin (1970–1971)

Keith Whitney (aka Jonah Lockwood) is the younger son of Gordon and Geraldine Whitney who is eventually revealed to be a serial killer. Geraldine's plea for Keith to stop his killing spree results in his fatal fall down the stairs of a lighthouse.

=== Schuyler Whitney ===
Larkin Malloy (1980–1984)

Dashing millionaire Schuyler Whitney arrives in 1980 and sweeps Raven Alexander off her feet. In 1982, it is revealed that Schuyler is actually impostor Jefferson Brown, accompanied by the nefarious Bruno Wagner, posing as his twin brother Gunther Wagner, Schuyler's loyal manservant and bodyguard. The real Gunther and Schuyler come to Monticello in 1982 and remain until the series finale in 1984, with Schuyler marrying Raven during that time.

Malloy was nominated for a Daytime Emmy Award for Outstanding Lead Actor in a Drama Series in 1984.

=== Tiffany Whitney ===
Lucy Martin (1970–1971, 1973–1976)

Tiffany Whitney Douglas is the wife of Colin Whitney.

=== Gavin Wylie ===
Mark Arnold (1980–1983)

== Other characters ==
Actor	Character	Duration
Jerry Zaks	Louis Van Dine	1983–84
Chris Weatherhead	Alicia Van Dine	1983–84
Larry Hagman	Det. Ed Gibson	1961–63
Tom Keena	Philip Seward	1979–80
Conard Fowkes	John Paul Anderson	1963
Jaques Roux	Dr. Calmette	1976
Mildred Clinton	Judge Sussman	1975–76
Amanda Blake	Dr. Julianna Stanhower	1984
Frank Gorshin	Smiley Wilson	1981–82
Alfred Drake	Dwight Endicott	1982
Lew Resseguie	Sgt. Sam Dwyer	1980
Ted Tinling	Vic Lamont	1969–75
Elizabeth Farley	Kay Lepage Reynolds Lamont	1973–75
Paul Vincent	Ashley Reynolds	1972–73
Alan Feinstein	Dr. Jim Fields	1969–75
George Petrie	District Attorney Peter Quinn	1963–74
Bernard Barrow	District Attorney Ira Paulson	1974–75
Judson Laire	Judge Blackwell	1973
James Ray	Bart Fletcher; Floyd Porter	1967–68; 1974
Mari Gorman	Taffy Simms	1973–74
Patricia Conwell	Tracy Dallas Micelli	1974–77
Lou Criscuolo	Danny Micelli	1973–77
Leslie Ray	Babs Werner Micelli	1974
Jay Gregory	Morlock Sevigny	1974–75
John LaGiola	Johnny Dallas	1973–77
Rosemary Rice	Mrs. Nick Bryce	1964
Niles McMaster	Dr. Clay Jordan	1975–77
Thom Christopher; Dick Latessa	Noel Douglas	1974; 1974–76
Bennett Cooperman	Benny Hayes	1979–80
George Hall	Ernie Tuttle #2/John	1970–78
Robert Dryden	Oliver Barbour	1966
Kate Wilkinson	Mrs. Perkins	1966
Stephen Elliott	Peter Dalton	1950s–1966
Edward Holmes	Willy Bryan	1950s–1966
Frances Chaney	Jeanne Culpepper	1950s–1960s, 1967
Cathleen Cordell	Virginia Dalton	1950s
Richard Janaver	Lloyd Conway	1950s
Barbara Joyce	Jane Conway	1950s
Phil Sterling	Johnny the Hitman	1968
Phil Sterling	Vic Ratner	1950s
House Jameson	John H. Phillips	1957–58
Jane White	Nurse Lydia Holliday, R.N.	1968–69
Irene Dailey	Pamela Stewart	1969–1970
Alice Hirson	Stephanie Martin	1969–70
Anne Revere	Dorothy Stewart #1	1969–70
John Cullum	David "Giddy" Gideon #2	1966–67
Scott Glenn	Calvin Brenner	1969
James Mitchell	Lloyd Griffin	1964
Barbara Berjer	Irene Eagon Wheeler	1964–65
Richard Thomas	Ben Schultz Jr.	1961
Ernest Graves	ADA Walter Palmerlee #2	1958
Ian Martin	Commissioner	
Leon Morenzie	Judge	1974–75
William Post Jr.	Mr. Hull; Walter Lepage	1964; 1974–75
Bill Macy	Cab driver	1966
Barry Newman	John Barnes	1964–65
Fred J. Schollay	Lobo Haynes	1972
Hugh Reilly	Dr. Simon Jessup	1972–73
Keith Charles	Rick Oliver	1966
Val Dufour	Andre Lazar	1965–66
Alan Manson	Ken Emerson	1964–68
Antony Ponzini	Tony Wyatt	1965–66
Lela Ivey	Mitzi Martin	1981–84
Cyd Quilling	Sean Murphy; Claire Day	1983
Pamela Shoemaker	Shelley Franklin	1983–84
John O'Hurley	Greg Schaeffer	1983–84
Sonia Petrovna	Martine Duval Crown	1980–81
Julianne Moore	Carmen Engler	1984
Karen Needle	Poppy Johnson	1982–83
