= 11th Daytime Emmy Awards =

- Date: June 27, 1984
- Location: Sheraton New York Times Square Hotel
- Presented by: National Academy of Television Arts and Sciences

Highlights
- Outstanding Drama Series: General Hospital
- Outstanding Game Show: The $25,000 Pyramid

The 11th Daytime Emmy Awards were held on Wednesday, June 27, 1984, to commemorate excellence in daytime programming from the previous year (1983). Once again, the ceremony was not telecast.

Winners in each category are in bold.

== Outstanding Daytime Drama Series ==
- All My Children
- Days of Our Lives
- **General Hospital**

== Outstanding Actor in a Daytime Drama Series ==
- James Mitchell (Palmer Cortlandt, All My Children)
- **Larry Bryggman (John Dixon, As the World Turns**)
- Joel Crothers (Miles Cavanaugh, The Edge of Night)
- Larkin Malloy (Schuyler Whitney, The Edge of Night)
- Stuart Damon (Alan Quartermaine, General Hospital)
- Terry Lester (Jack Abbott, The Young and the Restless)

== Outstanding Actress in a Daytime Drama Series ==
- Susan Lucci (Erica Kane, All My Children)
- Deidre Hall (Marlena Evans, Days of Our Lives)
- Ann Flood (Nancy Karr, The Edge of Night)
- Sharon Gabet (Raven Whitney, The Edge of Night)
- **Erika Slezak** (Victoria Lord, One Life to Live)

== Outstanding Supporting Actor in a Daytime Drama Series ==
- Louis Edmonds (Langley Wallingford, All My Children)
- Paul Stevens (Brian Bancroft, Another World)
- **Justin Deas** (Tom Hughes, As the World Turns)
- David Lewis (Edward Quartermaine, General Hospital)
- Anthony Call (Herb Callison, One Life to Live)
- John Stamos (Blackie Parrish, General Hospital)

== Outstanding Supporting Actress in a Daytime Drama Series ==
- Eileen Herlie (Myrtle Fargate, All My Children)
- Marcy Walker (Liza Colby, All My Children)
- Lois Kibbee (Geraldine Whitney Saxon, The Edge of Night)
- Loanne Bishop (Rose Kelly, General Hospital)
- **Judi Evans** (Beth Raines, Guiding Light)
- Christine Ebersole (Maxie McDermott, One Life to Live)

== Outstanding Daytime Drama Series Writing ==
- Days of our Lives: Margaret DePriest, Leah Markus , Sheri Anderson, Maralyn Thoma, Michael Robert David, Susan Goldberg , Bob Hansen, Dana Soloff
- All My Children
- General Hospital
- **Ryan's Hope: Claire Labine; Paul Avila Mayer; Mary Munisteri; Judith Pinsker; Nancy Ford; B.K. Perlman**

== Outstanding Daytime Drama Series Directing ==
- All My Children
- **One Life to Live**

== Outstanding Game Show ==
- **The $25,000 Pyramid** - A Bob-Sande Stewart Production for CBS
- Family Feud - A Mark Goodson Production for ABC (Syn. by Viacom)
- The Price Is Right - A Mark Goodson Production for CBS
- Wheel of Fortune - A Merv Griffin Production for NBC (Syn. by KingWorld)

== Outstanding Game Show Host/Hostess ==
- **Bob Barker** (The Price Is Right)
- Richard Dawson (Family Feud)
- Betty White (Just Men!)

== Outstanding Children's Entertainment Special ==
ABC Afterschool Specials - The Woman Who Willed a Miracle

- **Dick Clark** (executive producer)
- **Sharron Miller** (producer)

== Outstanding Performer in Children's Programing ==
- **Cloris Leachman** - ABC Afterschool Specials - The Woman Who Willed a Miracle

== Outstanding Individual Direction in Children's Programming ==
- **Sharron Miller** - ABC Afterschool Specials - The Woman Who Willed a Miracle

== Outstanding Children's Entertainment Series (Tie) ==
- **William Hanna, Joseph Barbera and Gerard Baldwin (The Smurfs)**
- **Robert Keeshan, Jim Hirschfeld, Bette Chichon and Ruth Manecke (Captain Kangaroo)**
