= 9th Daytime Emmy Awards =

- Date: June 11, 1982
- Location: Waldorf Astoria Hotel
- Presented by: National Academy of Television Arts and Sciences
- Hosted by: Bob Barker

Highlights
- Outstanding Drama Series: Guiding Light
- Outstanding Game Show: Password Plus

Television/radio coverage
- Network: CBS

The 9th Daytime Emmy Awards were held on Friday, June 11, 1982, to commemorate excellence in daytime programming from the previous year (1981). The telecast aired from 3-4:30 p.m. on CBS, preempting Guiding Light and Tattletales.

Winners in each category are in bold.

== Outstanding Daytime Drama Series ==
- All My Children
- General Hospital
- **Guiding Light**
- Ryan's Hope

== Outstanding Actor in a Daytime Drama Series ==
- James Mitchell (Palmer Cortlandt, All My Children)
- Richard Shoberg (Tom Cudahy, All My Children)
- Larry Bryggman (John Dixon, As the World Turns)
- Stuart Damon (Alan Quartermaine, General Hospital)
- **Anthony Geary** (Luke Spencer, General Hospital)

== Outstanding Actress in a Daytime Drama Series ==
- Susan Lucci (Erica Kane, All My Children)
- Ann Flood (Nancy Pollock, The Edge of Night)
- Sharon Gabet (Raven Whitney, The Edge of Night)
- Leslie Charleson (Monica Quartermaine, General Hospital)
- **Robin Strasser** (Dorian Lord, One Life to Live)

== Outstanding Supporting Actor in a Daytime Drama Series ==
- Darnell Williams (Jesse Hubbard, All My Children)
- **David Lewis** (Edward Quartermaine, General Hospital)
- Douglas Sheehan (Joe Kelly, General Hospital)
- Gerald Anthony (Marco Dane, One Life to Live)

== Outstanding Supporting Actress in a Daytime Drama Series ==
- Elizabeth Lawrence (Myra Sloane, All My Children)
- **Dorothy Lyman** (Opal Cortlandt, All My Children)
- Meg Mundy (Mona Croft, The Doctors)
- Louise Shaffer (Rae Woodward, Ryan's Hope)

== Outstanding Daytime Drama Series Writing ==
- **Guiding Light**
- All My Children
- One Life to Live
- The Edge of Night

== Outstanding Daytime Drama Series Directing ==
- All My Children
- **General Hospital**
- One Life to Live
- The Edge of Night

== Outstanding Game Show ==
- **Password Plus** - A Mark Goodson-Bill Todman Production for NBC
- Family Feud - A Mark Goodson-Bill Todman Production for ABC (Syn. by Viacom)
- The Price Is Right - A Mark Goodson-Bill Todman Production for CBS
- Wheel of Fortune - A Merv Griffin Production for NBC

== Outstanding Game Show Host ==
- **Bob Barker** (The Price Is Right)
- Bill Cullen (Blockbusters)
- Richard Dawson (Family Feud)
