= Maeve McGuire =

American actress

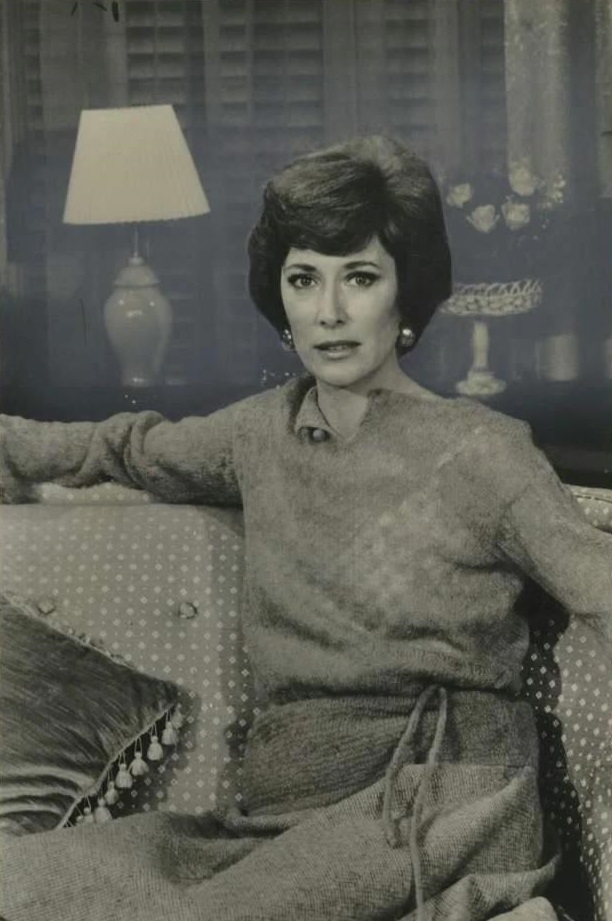
- McGuire in 1976
- Born: Cleveland, Ohio
- Occupation: Actress

Maeve McGuire is an American actress, known for her role as Nicole Travis Drake on the soap opera The Edge of Night, which she played from 1968 to 1977. Nicole originally started off as a schemer but as her popularity increased, her character became one of the show's major heroines in a romance with attorney Adam Drake (Donald May). She was then replaced by actress Jayne Bentzen, almost twenty years her junior.

In 1975, she played Maude Lassiter Palmer on the short-lived nighttime show Beacon Hill.

McGuire was also well known for playing the role of Elena DePoulignac (Cecile's sophisticated mother) on Another World from 1981 to 1983, and has appeared on other daytime programs, including Search for Tomorrow, on which she appeared with William Prince, the actor who had originated the role of her father Ben Travis, and Ann Flood who played her friend Nancy Karr on The Edge of Night. McGuire took over the part of Kate McCleary, a matriarchal role that had earlier been played by the older Jo Henderson.

She later played Judith Sheffield, the socialite mother of a gay teen played by Ben Jorgensen, on the soap opera All My Children. On One Life to Live, she played the short-term role of Beverly Crane, an old friend of Sloane Carpenter's (Roy Thinnes) who agreed to pretend to be having an affair with him after he found out he was dying so he wouldn't make his new wife Victoria Lord suffer watching him die.

She also filled in for Eileen Fulton as Lisa on As the World Turns a number of times during the early 1990s and also played Selena, a madame, on Guiding Light for a brief time in 1993.

She has appeared on stage as M'Lynn in off-Broadway's Steel Magnolias, as Irene Livingston in the Jewish Repertory Theatre's Light Up the Sky, and on Broadway in Cyrano de Bergerac (Cassandace), The Miser (Marianne), Mixed Emotions (understudying the character Christine Millman) and Garden District (understudying the characters Mrs. Venable, Miss Foxhill and Grace).
