= Nola Madison =

- The Edge of Night character
- Kim Hunter as Nola Madison in March 1980
- Portrayed by: Kim Hunter
- First appearance: June 1979
- Last appearance: March 14, 1980
- Created by: Henry Slesar
- Introduced by: Erwin Nicholson
In-universe information
- Occupation: Actress
- Husband: Owen Madison
- Sons: Brian Madison
- Stepdaughters: Paige Madison

Nola Madison is a fictional character from the ABC Daytime soap opera The Edge of Night. The role was played by actress Kim Hunter from June 1979 to March 1980.

== Character ==
=== Casting and development ===
The Edge of Night's casting director, Ruth Levine, happened to meet film actress Kim Hunter at a cocktail party just as head writer Henry Slesar had devised a storyline about "an aging movie star who drinks too much and has a messed-up love life." Hunter, known for portraying Stella Kowalski in the original production of Tennessee Williams' A Streetcar Named Desire, and later winning both an Academy Award for Best Supporting Actress and a Golden Globe Award for Best Supporting Actress in a Motion Picture for the 1951 film adaptation, initially declined the short term role of Nola Madison. Eventually she signed a six-month contract. Hunter first appeared as Nola in June 1979, with the understanding that the character would be written out by December 1979. Slesar later came up with an extended storyline in which Nola would play a witch in a horror film, and a side plot in which she would disguise herself as an old woman and drug some of the other characters. Hunter agreed to stay with the series for three more months.

Hunter said in 1999 that the offer to do a soap opera was a "peculiar suggestion" at the time, but she found the character "interesting". Richard Simms of Soaps She Knows wrote that The Edge of Night could "attract actors who might otherwise not have considered joining a soap" because many plots in the series "revolved around short-term evil-doers who would eventually be brought to justice by the core characters". Though lamenting that the fast pace of soap opera production allowed for less rehearsal than she was used to, Hunter said, "The characters are fascinating and are allowed to grow and progress, which doesn't happen very often on nighttime TV." Hunter said that the live to tape, five episode per week pace was "exhausting", but that the job was an "extraordinary experience" that she did not regret. Her last appearance was on March 14, 1980.

=== Description ===
J. Bernard Jones of Daytime Confidential explained that "Head writer Henry Slesar shrewdly wrote Nola as a combination of Stella Kowalski from A Streetcar Named Desire and Norma Desmond [from Sunset Boulevard]: drunk, neurotic, jealous, egotistical, vengeful, lonely, sad, murderous, tragic and ultimately broken."

== Storylines ==
Film star Nola Madison arrives in Monticello in June 1979, having checked herself out of a rehabilitation center where she was battling alcoholism. Her producer husband Owen Madison (Bruce Gray) and adult stepdaughter Paige (Margaret Colin) had come to town weeks earlier because of Paige's criminal involvement with a militant revolutionary group. Nola and Owen's son Brian (Stephen McNaughton) appears, and Paige agrees to turns state's evidence against her cohorts. Subsequently, Paige survives several attempts on her life. With her career in decline, Nola has resumed drinking, and she obsesses about Owen's infatuation with police detective Deborah Saxon (Frances Fisher). In August 1979, Nola is offered the role of witch Hester Atherton, the lead in a horror movie called Mansion of the Damned. She hears Owen tell producer Eddie Vaughn (Stratton Walling) that she is washed up, and goes on a drunken bender. Half-siblings Paige and Brian are tortured by their secret love for each other, and Eddie, who is Nola's ex-lover, confesses that he still loves her. Movie star Trent Archer (Farley Granger) is hired to play opposite Nola, but quits in fear as the film set is plagued by accidents and strange occurrences.

Nola takes an interest in married playboy Eliot Dorn (Lee Godart), but is also furious that Owen and Deborah have gotten closer. Deborah begins receiving mysterious phone calls in October 1979, and after her apartment is ransacked, she and Owen kiss. Nola and Eddie discuss the "pranks" they have been playing on set as a publicity stunt, and Paige and Deborah suspect that Nola is behind the phone calls. Deborah tells Nola to stop, assuring the actress she has no interest in interfering with her marriage to Owen. Nola sends Deborah a box of poisoned chocolates. Deborah survives, but cannot prove that Nola was behind it. Realizing that Brian and Paige are in love, Eddie urges Nola to confess the truth that he is Brian's father, and Paige and Brian are not related. When filming is over, Nola lures Deborah to the studio and sets it on fire, but Eddie is trapped instead. He dies before he can tell Brian the truth, but his will reveals Brian's true paternity. Paige and Brian marry, and leave town in November 1979.

In December 1979, Nola disguises herself as an old woman, Martha Cory, and moves into an apartment near Deborah. Nola feeds drugged soup to Deborah, who collapses. She survives, so Nola arranges for Deborah to be abducted and left in the woods. Dr. Miles Cavanaugh (Joel Crothers) becomes suspicious of Nola. She gives a drugged fruitcake to a deathly ill Deborah, but Miles realizes what Nola is up to. He threatens to tell the police and she agrees to leave Deborah alone, but then Nola drugs the water cooler in Miles's office. He becomes erratic and prone to violent outbursts, and nearly pushes his wife Nicole Cavanaugh (Jayne Bentzen) over a penthouse railing on New Year's Eve. Nola and Eliot both realize that they hate Miles. In January 1980, prosecutor Cliff Nelson (Ernie Townsend) gets sick from Mrs. Cory's soup. Still under the influence of Nola's drugs, Miles is taunted by a hallucination of his deceased wife, and becomes convinced that Nicole is having an affair with Police Chief Derek Mallory (Dennis Parker).

Nola and Eliot are furious that his bitter wife, newscaster Margo Huntington (Ann Williams), is intent on punishing him by not giving him an easy divorce. Miles reveals to police detective Steve Guthrie (Denny Albee), who is seeing Deborah, that Nola posed as Mrs. Cory to torment her, but Deborah has figured this out on her own. Margo is bludgeoned to death, and Eliot reminds Nola that they are now free to marry. Eliot is a suspect, and as an alibi he claims to have been with a married woman he refuses to name. Having suffered a blackout, Miles fears he may have committed the crime. He nearly commits suicide before Derek realizes the water cooler is drugged. Proof surfaces that Mrs. Cory purchased illegal drugs, and Derek vows to get Nola even though Deborah and Miles decline to file charges. Margo's son-in-law Draper Scott (Tony Craig) is charged with her murder. Margo's doorman testifies that Nola had visited Margo the night she died, but Margo had left the building after Nola had. Eliot's alibi is challenged but his lover, revealed to be Raven Alexander (Sharon Gabet), makes a dramatic entrance into the courtroom. Draper is convicted.

In March 1980, Nola is jealous of Eliot's history with Raven, and resumes drinking. Deborah finds Margo's wig among Nola's belongings, and confronts her. Nola unravels, and confesses that she killed Margo in an unplanned, jealous rage because Margo would not divorce Eliot. Nola then seized the opportunity to frame Draper, putting on Margo's wig to pretend for eyewitnesses that Margo left and came back before Draper's arrival. Owen and Steve escort Nola to the police station.

== Reception ==
Hunter was nominated for a Daytime Emmy Award for Outstanding Lead Actress in a Drama Series in 1980 for her portrayal of Nola, though Judith Light won that year for portraying housewife-turned-hooker Karen Wolek on the ABC soap opera One Life to Live. Jones called Hunter's performance in her final scenes "stunning", and wrote "Keep your eyes on Hunter, who dominates every frame, going from mildly tipsy to staggering drunk to slightly detached insanity, yet never losing her wit or intelligence. Hunter does bravura work in an episode that was a brilliant denouement to one of Edge's most confounding murder mysteries and magnificent send-off for one of the series' most memorable characters and actresses."
