= David Froman =

American actor (1938–2010)

- Born: David Wesley Froman; December 31, 1938; Miami, Oklahoma, U.S.
- Died: February 8, 2010 (aged 71); Miami, Oklahoma, U.S.
- Occupations: Actor, professor
- Years active: 1961–1994
- Spouse: Audrey Froman (m. 1978)
- Children: 7

David Wesley Froman (December 31, 1938 – February 8, 2010) was an American actor, born in Miami, Oklahoma. His parents were Guy and Gertrude (Helm) Froman. He taught for many years at Northeastern Oklahoma A&M College (NEO), where he was professor of speech and theater. He was best known for his recurring role as Lieutenant Bob Brooks on the popular television series Matlock.

== Career ==
Froman graduated NEO in 1961, and immediately began teaching speech and theater. In 1969, he left Oklahoma to launch his acting career. Froman appeared on 56 episodes of Matlock from 1986 to 1994 as Lt. Bob Brooks. He also appeared on several other television shows of the 1980s and 1990s, such as Hill Street Blues, Trapper John, M.D., 21 Jump Street, Cheers and Diagnosis Murder. In addition, he played Captain K'Nera in an episode of Star Trek: The Next Generation.

Froman was well known for his role of both Gunther Wagner, Schuyler Whitney's faithful servant, and Gunther's twin brother Bruno on The Edge of Night from 1980 to 1984.

In 1986, he appeared in the TV film Blind Justice, starring Tim Matheson.

Froman also worked as a drama instructor at NEO in Miami, Oklahoma. He served as president of the Miami Little Theatre as well as acting on stage in several productions as late as November 2, 2009.

== Personal ==
Froman married Audrey Stein in Staten Island, New York on December 23, 1978. They continued living there until 1984, then they moved to Los Angeles. In 1994, they moved from Los Angeles to Miami, Oklahoma. He returned to the faculty of NEO, and where he directed shows and musicals. He retired from teaching in 2002, but resumed as a part-time teacher in 2007.

== Death ==
On February 8, 2010, Froman died of cancer in Miami, Oklahoma, aged 71. He was survived by his wife, Audrey, and their six children.

A celebration of Froman's life was held at NEO, where faculty and students articulated on his impact on their lives. Barbara George, chairwoman of NEO's Fine Arts Department, said "the respect for Froman among students and faculty members was so great that any praise from him, made us all glow. His disappointment would have been crushing, so everyone always strove to do their best and beyond, if only for David...He will be greatly, profoundly missed, but the lessons he taught us all will live on forever."
