= Herb Granath =

American sportscaster (died 2019)

- Born: June 23, 1928
- Died: November 26, 2019 (aged 91)

Herb Granath (1928 - November 26, 2019) was an American sportscaster. In 2001, he was awarded the Sports Emmy for Sports Lifetime Achievement Award. Granath spent the bulk of his career with ABC, spearheading their movements into cable and international television. He also served as Chairman of the Board for ESPN, A&E, The History Channel, Lifetime Television and Disney/ABC International. He also served as president of Capital Cities/ABC's Video Enterprises. Following his time with ABC, he served as co-chairman of Crown Media Holdings, vice chairman of Central European Media, and senior content adviser to Telenet. Granath was a graduate of Fordham University and spent time in the military at the beginning of his career. Granath's wife of over sixty years was Ann Flood.

Granath lived in Darien, Connecticut, and died on November 26, 2019.
