= Robert Kennedy and His Times =

1985 American television miniseries

- VHS cover
- Genre: Drama
- Based on: Robert Kennedy and His Times by Arthur M. Schlesinger Jr.
- Written by: Walon Green
- Directed by: Marvin J. Chomsky
- Starring: Brad Davis; Veronica Cartwright; Ned Beatty; Cliff De Young; Joe Pantoliano; Harris Yulin; Jeffrey Tambor; Jack Warden; River Phoenix; Jason Bateman; Shannen Doherty
- Theme music composer: Fred Karlin
- Country of origin: United States
- Original language: English
- No. of episodes: 3

Production
- Producers: Robert W. Christiansen; Rick Rosenberg
- Cinematography: Michael D. Margulies
- Editor: Corky Ehlers
- Running time: 309 mins
- Production company: Columbia Pictures Television

Original release
- Network: CBS
- Release: January 27 – January 29, 1985

Robert Kennedy and His Times is a 1985 American television miniseries directed by Marvin J. Chomsky, based on the 1978 Robert F. Kennedy biography of the same name by Arthur M. Schlesinger Jr.

== Cast ==
Actor	Role
Brad Davis	Robert F. Kennedy
Veronica Cartwright	Ethel Skakel Kennedy
Cliff De Young	John F. Kennedy
Ned Beatty	J. Edgar Hoover
Beatrice Straight	Rose Fitzgerald Kennedy
G.D. Spradlin	Lyndon B. Johnson
George Grizzard	John Seigenthaler Sr.
Harris Yulin	Joseph McCarthy
Mitchell Ryan	Robert McNamara
Joe Pantoliano	Roy Cohn
Jeffrey Tambor	Pierre Salinger
Jack Warden	Joseph P. Kennedy Sr.
Jordan Charney	Arthur M. Schlesinger Jr.
John Ericson	Senator
Danna Hansen	Lady Bird Johnson
Mimi Kennedy	Pat Kennedy
Dean Santoro	Fred Dutton
Charles Bateman	Army General Carey
Juanin Clay	Jacqueline Kennedy Onassis
Dorothy Fielding	Jean Kennedy Smith
Ben Fuhrman	Edward Partin
Belita Moreno	Angie Novello
James Read	Edward Kennedy
Dennis Redfield	Walter Sheridan
Alan Rosenberg	Jack Newfield
Hansford Rowe	Ron McMasters
Trey Wilson	Jimmy Hoffa
Natalie Gregory; Betsy Baker	Courtney Kennedy Hill (Part 1&2); Courtney Kennedy Hill (Part 3)
Jason Bateman	Joseph P. Kennedy Jr.
Jeremy Brown	Matthew Kennedy
Shannen Doherty; Rebecca Gullion	Kathleen Kennedy (Part 1&2); Kathleen Kennedy (Part 3)
Chris Hebert; River Phoenix	Robert F. Kennedy Jr. (Part 1&2); Robert F. Kennedy Jr. (Part 3)
Steve Rumph	Young Joseph P. Kennedy Jr.
Branden Williams	David Kennedy
Dorothy Butts	Annie Lee Moss
Albert Hall	Roy Wilkins
Richard Kuss	Dave Beck
Wendy LaMastra	Joan Bennett Kennedy
Christopher Lofton	Stephen Edward Smith
Elizabeth Norment	Eunice Kennedy Shriver
Jack Thibeau	Clyde Tolson
Barbara Allyne Bennet	Evelyn Lincoln
Shelly Lipkin	Robert Morgenthau
Walter Mathews	Kenneth Keating
Bufort McClerkins	Roosevelt Grier
Brent Spiner	Allard Lowenstein

== Awards and nominations ==
Year	Award	N/W	Category/People
1985	Emmy Award	N	Lynda Gurasich for Outstanding Achievement in Hairstyling (Part 1)
1985	Emmy Award	N	Robert W. Christiansen and Rick Rosenberg for Outstanding Limited Series

== See also ==
- Robert F. Kennedy in media
- Cultural depictions of John F. Kennedy
