= Kyle Sampson (Guiding Light) =

- Guiding Light character
- Portrayed by: Larkin Malloy
- Duration: 1984–87
- First appearance: December 31, 1984
- Last appearance: January 23, 1987
- Created by: Pam Long
In-universe information
- Occupation: Owner & President of Sampson Industries
- Parents: Cardinal John Malone (father, deceased); Sally Gleason (mother, deceased)
- Siblings: Billy Lewis II; Harlan Billy "Billy" Lewis II (half-brother)
- Spouse: Maeve Stoddard (divorced, deceased) [1986]
- Children: Benjamin "Ben" Reade (son, with Maeve, deceased)
- Other relatives: Melinda Sue "Mindy" Lewis (niece) Dylan Shayne Lewis; Dylan Lewis (nephew) Bill Lewis III; Harlan Billy "Bill" Lewis III (nephew) Daisy Lemay; Susan "Daisy" Lemay (great-niece)

Kyle Sampson is a fictional character from the CBS daytime soap opera Guiding Light. He was played by Larkin Malloy from 1984 to 1987.

== Biography ==
Sampson was the result of an affair between Cardinal John Malone and Sally Gleason. He was the President of Sampson Industries, which caused him to become an enemy to both Alan Spaulding and Billy Lewis. It was once believed that Kyle was the son of Lewis Oil founder, H.B. Lewis. He was in love with and engaged to Billy and H.B.'s ex-wife Reva Shayne. Kyle was once believed to be the biological father of Reva's daughter Marah, but he was the biological father of Ben Reade with his ex-wife Maeve. In 1987, after having left Springfield, Kyle had become engaged to a woman named Amy Dupree. Later in that same year Kyle and Amy were involved in a plane crash that killed both Amy and his father John Malone and left Kyle comatose.
