= Patrick Horgan (actor) =

British actor (1929–2021)

- Publicity Photo of Patrick Horgan
- Born: John Patrick Horgan; 29 May 1929; Nottingham, United Kingdom
- Died: 6 October 2021 (aged 92)
- Occupation: Actor
- Spouse: Irish McCalla (m. 1958; div. 1969)

John Patrick Horgan (26 May 1929 – 6 October 2021) was a British-American actor of Irish descent. He was known for playing Dr. John Morrison in the NBC soap opera television series The Doctors. He completed an unabridged reading of Finnegans Wake in 1985 for the Library of Congress. He also recorded a number of audiobooks for the National Library Service for the Blind and Print Disabled from 1970 onward.

Horgan died on 6 October 2021, at the age of 92.

== Personal life ==
Horgan was married to the actress Irish McCalla from 1958 to 1969. They divorced in 1969 due to a disagreement over whether to vote for Eldridge Cleaver of the Peace and Freedom Party.

== Filmography ==
- The Doctors as Dr. John Morrison (1970–1974)
- The Thomas Crown Affair as Danny (1968)
- The Wild Wild West as Max Crenshaw (1969)
- Star Trek as Eneg (1968)
- The High Chaparral as Anthony Grey (1967)
- Green Acres as Tony Ashley (1967)
- Bewitched as Harry the Ghost (1971)
- The Edge of Night as Ansel Scott (1976–1977)
- Ryan's Hope as Thatcher Ross (1978–1979)
- Guiding Light as Neil Blake (1981–1982)
- Zelig as the Narrator (1983)
- George Washington as General Howe (1984)
- As the World Turns as Anton Cunningham (1986–1987, 1998)
