= Juanin Clay =

American actress (1949–1995)

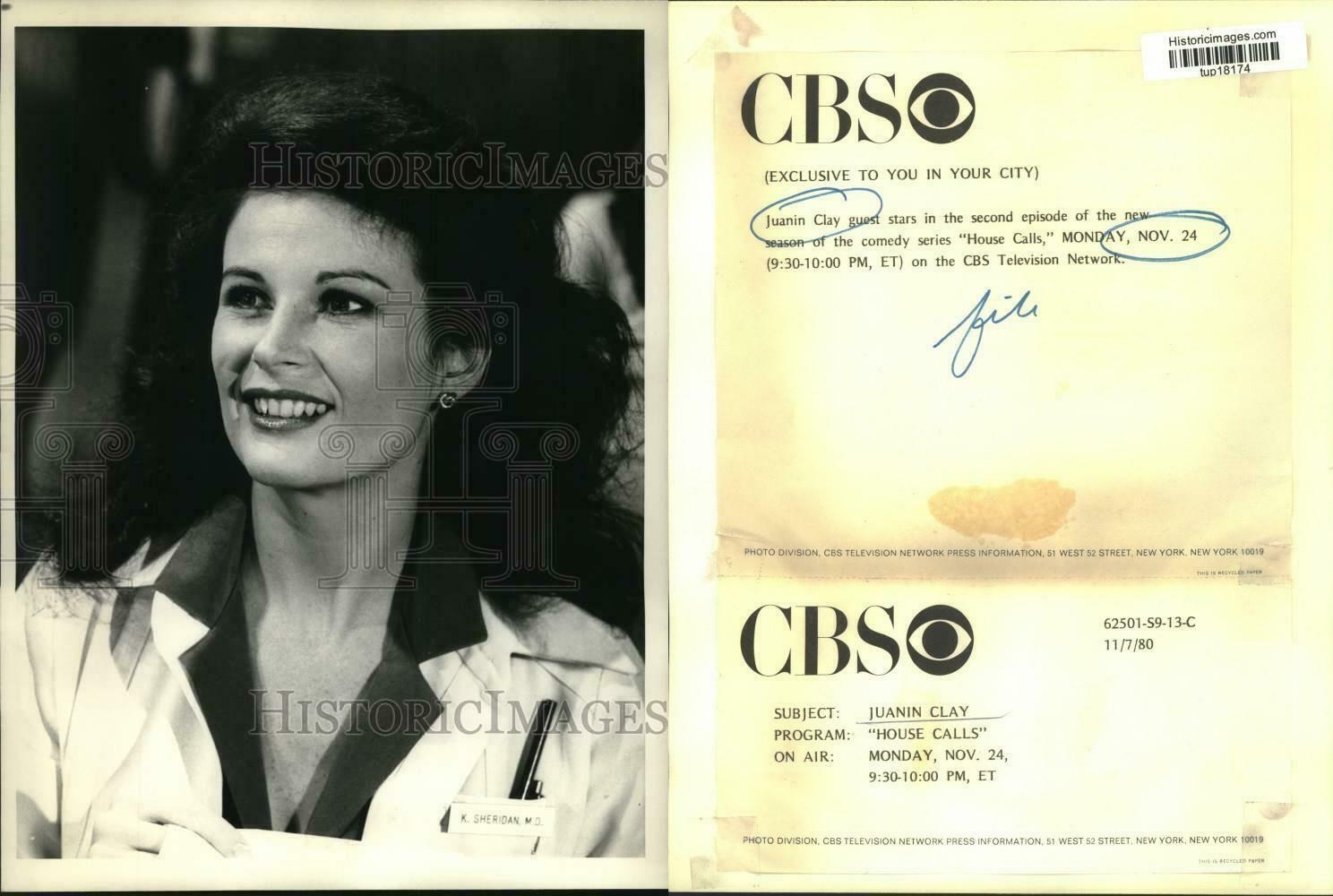
- Juanin Clay in 1980
- Born: Juanin Clay de Zalduondo; November 26, 1949; Westchester County, New York, U.S.
- Died: March 12, 1995 (aged 45); Los Angeles, California, U.S.
- Education: Smith College; Harvard University (Ed.M.)
- Occupations: Actress; teacher
- Years active: 1956–1991
- Known for: WarGames; The Legend of the Lone Ranger; The Edge of Night
- Spouse: Joe Lambie (m. 1981, divorced)

Juanin Clay (born Juanin Clay de Zalduondo; November 26, 1949 – March 12, 1995) was an American actress whose films included WarGames and The Legend of the Lone Ranger.

== Early years ==
Clay was born in Westchester County, New York, to Antonio and Barbara de Zalduondo. and attended the Ethel Walker School in Simsbury, Connecticut. She graduated from Smith College, then earned a master's degree in education from Harvard University. She was a kindergarten teacher in Connecticut before she became an actress.

== Career ==
Clay originated the role of Raven Alexander on the daytime soap opera The Edge of Night from 1976 to 1977, and chose to leave to pursue other projects. She was a contender for the role of Wilma Deering in the 1979–1981 television series Buck Rogers in the 25th Century, but lost the role to Erin Gray, who returned to reprise her role from the 1979 theatrical release. Clay later guest-starred in the Buck Rogers episode "Vegas in Space", playing Marla Landers, who briefly partnered with Rogers. Clay appeared as a guest star on a number of TV series, including Father Murphy and L.A. Law. In 1981, she appeared in The Legend of the Lone Ranger, and in 1983, she had a small role in WarGames. In 1985, she played Jacqueline Kennedy in the miniseries Robert Kennedy and His Times. She was a founding member of the New York Acting Unit, a Shakespearean repertory group, and the co-author, producer, and director of King of the City, a drama about Al Capone.

Clay's work on stage included acting off-Broadway and in productions in Los Angeles and Edinburgh, Scotland.

== Personal life and death ==
In 1981, Clay married Joe Lambie, who played opposite her as Logan Swift on The Edge of Night. She was a Christian Scientist.

Clay died of cancer in a convalescent hospital in Los Angeles on March 12, 1995. She was 45 years old.

== Legacy ==
The Valley Theatre League of Los Angeles created the Juanin Clay Lifetime Achievement Award in her memory.

== Filmography ==
Year	Title	Role	Notes
1976–1977	The Edge of Night	Raven Alexander	TV series
1978	Thou Shalt Not Commit Adultery		TV movie
1979	The Fantastic Seven	Dinah Latimore	TV movie
1979	Buck Rogers in the 25th Century	Major Marla Landers	Episode: "Vegas in Space" (S1/E5)
1980	Skag	Joyce	TV series
1980	The Associates	Yvonne Winslow	TV series
1980	House Calls		TV series
1981	Foul Play	Pandora	TV series
1981	Nero Wolfe	Annabel Fey	TV series
1981	The Legend of the Lone Ranger	Amy Striker	Film
1982	The Long Summer of George Adams	Ann Sharp	TV movie
1982	Father Murphy	Amanda Singer	TV series
1983	WarGames	Patricia Healy	Film
1985	Robert Kennedy and His Times	Jacqueline Kennedy	TV series
1985	Our Family Honor	Rita Danzig	TV series
1986	L.A. Law	Judge Alice Ratakowsky	TV series
1991	Shannon's Deal	Greed	TV series
