= Irving Allen Lee =

American actor

- Born: November 21, 1948
- Died: September 5, 1992 (aged 43)
- Occupation: Actor
- Known for: The Edge of Night

Irving Allen Lee (November 21, 1948 – September 5, 1992) was an American actor known for playing Detective Calvin Stoner on The Edge of Night from 1977 to 1984 and Dr. Evan Cooper on Ryan's Hope from 1986 to 1988. He also appeared in "Ain't Misbehavin" in the late 1970s. He died from an AIDS related illness in 1992, aged 43.

== Filmography ==
- The Edge of Night (1979–1984) (Calvin Stoner)
- Breaking Up (Dion) (uncredited)
- Ryan's Hope (1986–1989) (Dr. Evan Cooper)
