= Nancy Karr =

- The Edge of Night character
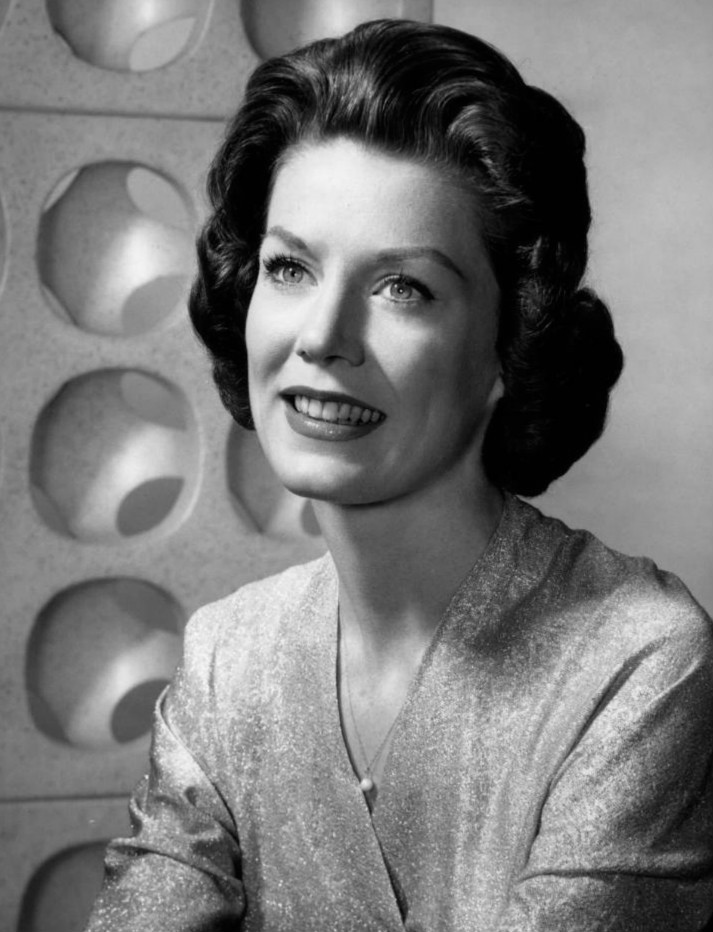
- Ann Flood as Nancy Pollock Karr in 1963
- Portrayed by: Ann Flood
- Duration: 1962–1984
- First appearance: March 22, 1962
- Last appearance: December 28, 1984
- Created by: Irving Vendig and James Gentile
In-universe information
- Occupation: Reporter/Columnist for The Monticello News; Novelist (The Sword of Love, 1983); Newscaster at WMON-TV
- Father: Joe Pollock
- Mother: Rose Pollock
- Brothers: Lee Pollock
- Sisters: Elaine "Cookie" Pollock
- Husband: Mike Karr
- Adoptive sons: Timmy Farraday
- Stepdaughters: Laurie Ann Karr
- Grandsons: John Victor Dallas (step)

Nancy Karr (maiden name Pollock) is a fictional character in the long-running daytime soap opera The Edge of Night. The role was played by actress Ann Flood for 22 years, from 1962 until the series ended in 1984.

== Performer ==
Nancy was portrayed by Ann Flood from 1962 until The Edge of Night was cancelled in 1984. At the show's conclusion, she was the longest-serving cast member. Flood was twice nominated for a Daytime Emmy Award for Outstanding Lead Actress in a Drama Series, in 1982 and 1984.

== Characterization ==
Nancy was the daughter of Joe and Rose Pollock, and was a newspaper reporter for the periodical in the fictional midwestern town of Monticello. She also had two siblings, Lee, who was married to Gerry McGrath; and Elaine, called Cookie. She had met and fell in love with widower Mike Karr, a lawyer who had lost his first wife, Sara Lane, to a terrible accident. They married in 1963. Nancy proved herself to be a wonderful stepmother to his daughter, Laurie Ann, and in 1963, married Mike. The two were very much in love and were married through the series ended in 1984. During that time, she and Mike also adopted Timmy Faraday after the death of his father, and the arrest and imprisonment of his mother, Serena. She is also a grandmother to John Victor Dallas, the son of Laurie Ann and her husband.
