= David Lewis (American actor) =

American actor (1916–2000)

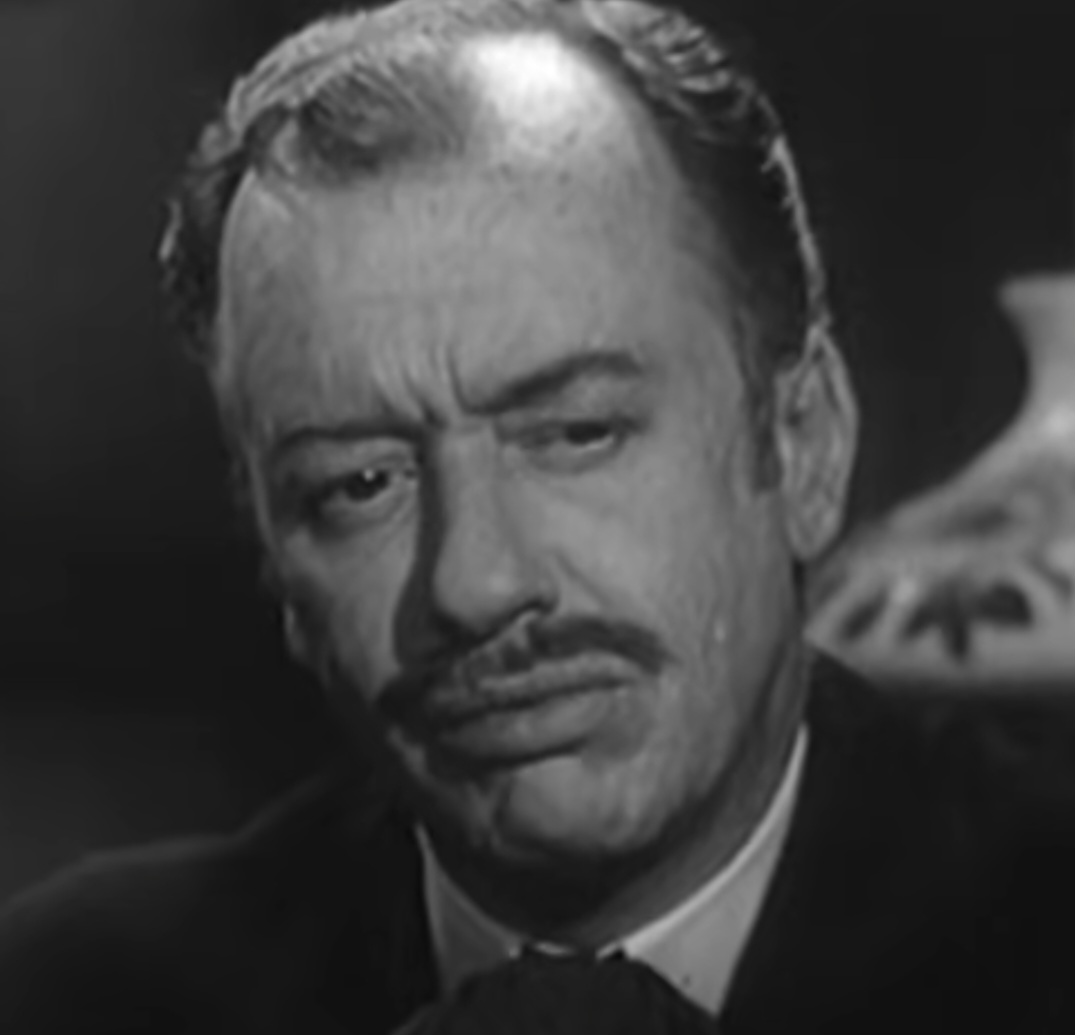
- Lewis in an episode of One Step Beyond (1959)
- Born: October 19, 1916; Pittsburgh, Pennsylvania, U.S.
- Died: December 11, 2000 (aged 84); Woodland Hills, California, U.S.
- Occupation: Actor
- Years active: 1949–1993

David Lewis (October 19, 1916 – December 11, 2000) was an American actor. He was best known for being the original actor to portray Edward Quartermaine from 1978 to 1993 on the American soap opera General Hospital.

== Early years ==
Lewis was born in Pittsburgh, Pennsylvania.

== Television ==
Lewis was a pioneering actor in television, his first televised role occurring in 1949 on the show Captain Video and His Video Rangers. His credits include appearing in seven episodes of Perry Mason and one episode of The Tom Ewell Show and in the recurring role of Warden Crichton in Batman. Lewis appeared on daytime television, making his soap debut on Love of Life as a murderer and later playing patriarch Henry Pierce on Bright Promise. Brief guest stints on The Young and the Restless and Days of Our Lives followed.

In 1978, he joined the cast of General Hospital in the role of Edward Quartermaine, for which he won a Daytime Emmy Award for Outstanding Supporting Actor in a Daytime Drama in 1982. Lewis took time off between 1987 and 1988 for medical recovery and departed in 1989 during which time Edward was believed to be dead. Lewis continued to come to the studio, however, to tape his voice so wife Lila could have conversations with him. Lewis made his comeback in November 1991 when Edward came back from the dead and in the summer of 1993, Lewis announced he was retiring permanently.

Lewis played Charles Ames on the ABC comedy The Farmer's Daughter (1963–1966).

== Death ==
Lewis died in Woodland Hills, California, after a long illness.

== Filmography ==
Year	Title	Role	Notes
1956	The Scarlet Hour	Dr. Sam Lynbury	
1956	That Certain Feeling	Joe Wickes	
1960	The Apartment	Al Kirkeby	
1960	Alfred Hitchcock Presents	Jim	Season 6 Episode 8: "O Youth and Beauty!"
1961	The Absent Minded Professor	General Singer	
1962	Alfred Hitchcock Presents	Ed Boling	Season 7 Episode 14: "Bad Actor"
1962	The Spiral Road	Major Vlormans	
1962	Kid Galahad	Otto Danzig	
1962	A Girl Named Tamiko	Minor Role	Uncredited
1962	Perry Mason	John Gifford	
1964	Honeymoon Hotel	Mr. Hampton	
1964	Voyage to the Bottom of the Sea	Dr. Kranz	
1965	John Goldfarb, Please Come Home!	Stottle Cronkite	
1965	Perry Mason	Wallis Lanphier	S9, E6 "The Case of the Careless Coronary"
1968	The Boston Strangler	Judge Schroeder	
1969	Generation	Arlington	
1973	Cleopatra Jones	Minor Role	Uncredited
1978	Mean Dog Blues	Dr. Caleb Odum	
