= Larkin Malloy =

American actor

- Born: Thomas Larkin Malloy; September 24, 1954; New York City, U.S.
- Died: September 29, 2016 (aged 62); New York City, U.S.
- Occupation: Actor
- Known for: Daytime soap operas
- Notable work: The Edge of Night; Guiding Light; All My Children

Thomas Larkin Malloy (September 24, 1954 – September 29, 2016) was an American soap opera actor, voice-over artist and acting teacher.

== Early life ==
Malloy was born in New York City, the third child of John and Theresa (née Larkin) Malloy, both Irish immigrants. He had one older brother, Patrick Malloy, and one older sister, Maureen Malloy.

== Career ==
Malloy began his acting career in 1974 while he attended Iona College and acted in Off-Off-Broadway plays.

His first major television role was wealthy playboy Schuyler Whitney (and his impostor) on the ABC daytime soap opera The Edge of Night from 1980 to 1984. Malloy next played businessman Kyle Sampson opposite Kim Zimmer on the CBS soap Guiding Light from 1984 to 1987. His longest running role was Travis Montgomery, opposite Susan Lucci, on the ABC soap All My Children, which he played on and off from 1987 to 2001.

While on The Edge of Night, Malloy was hit by a car on Park Avenue in New York City. He was temporarily replaced by James Horan, who Malloy would later replace as Clay Alden on Loving in 1992.

In later years, Larkin worked as a voice-over artist and acting teacher.

== Personal life ==
Malloy died on September 29, 2016, in New York City, from complications of a heart attack he suffered on his 62nd birthday.

== Filmography ==
=== Film ===
Year	Title	Role
1999	Big Daddy	Restaurant Owner
2016	Trivia Night	The Producer
2016	Good Bones	Charles Schuyler

=== Television ===
Year	Title	Role	Notes
1980–1984	The Edge of Night	Schuyler Whitney	
1984–1987	Guiding Light	Kyle Sampson	
1987–91, 1997–98, 2001	All My Children	Travis Montgomery	
1992	Loving	Clay Alden #2	
2002, 2006	As the World Turns	Radio Announcer / Dr. Weston	4 episodes
2003	Law & Order	Doug Barsky	Episode: "House Calls"
2014–2017	Tainted Dreams	Henry Steinman	11 episodes
