= Forrest Compton =

American actor (1925–2020)

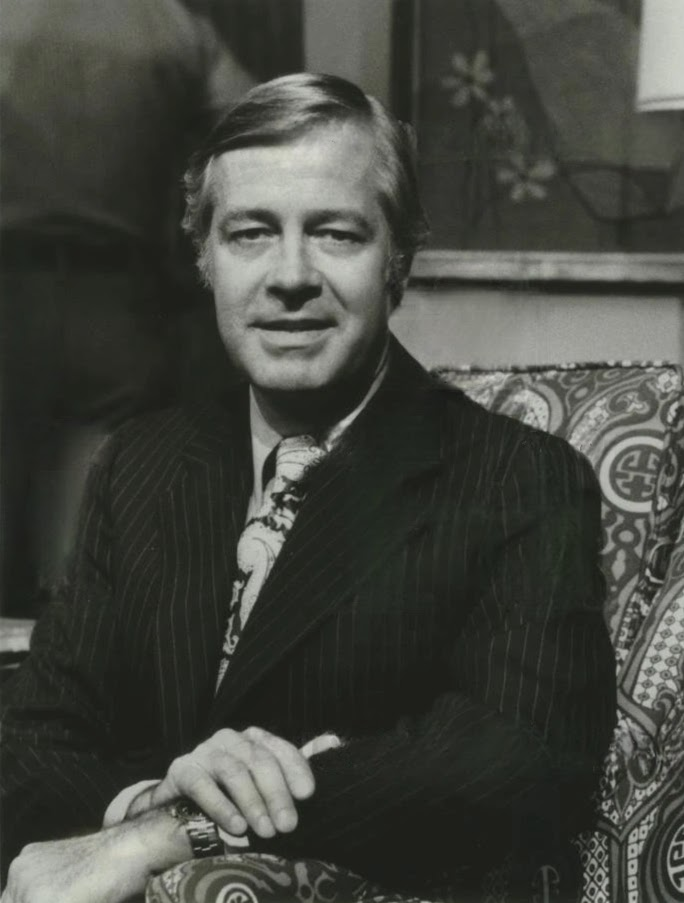
- Compton in The Edge of Night, 1977
- Born: September 15, 1925; Reading, Pennsylvania, U.S.
- Died: April 4, 2020 (aged 94); Shelter Island, New York, U.S.
- Education: Swarthmore College (BA); Yale University (MFA)
- Occupation: Actor
- Years active: 1957–2002
- Spouse: Jeanne Sementini (m. 1975)

Forrest Compton (September 15, 1925 – April 4, 2020) was an American actor, primarily known for playing Mike Karr on the daytime soap opera The Edge of Night, as well as Colonel Gray on Gomer Pyle, U.S.M.C.

== Early life and education ==
Compton was born in 1925 in Reading, Pennsylvania. His father sold aluminum pots and pans and worked at a local steel mill. After high school, Compton fought in the 103rd Infantry Division during World War II. When the war ended, Compton attended Swarthmore College, where he initially studied pre-law and political science but later switched to English. Compton also began acting school theatre productions. After graduating from Swarthmore, Compton earned a Master of Fine Arts degree from the Yale School of Drama, where he befriended Paul Newman.

== Career ==
Compton was best known for portraying attorney Mike Karr, the central character on the long-running soap opera The Edge of Night, on which he appeared from 1970 to 1984. He also played stern but fair battalion commander Lieutenant Colonel Edward Gray on the 1960s sitcom Gomer Pyle, USMC. He had a recurring role in 1959–1960 in the NBC series The Troubleshooters with Keenan Wynn, Bob Mathias, and Chet Allen. His other television credits include The Twilight Zone, 77 Sunset Strip, My Three Sons, Mayberry RFD, Mannix, Hogan's Heroes, That Girl, Another World, Loving, One Life to Live, As the World Turns and Ed. He also portrayed President Flynn in the 1991 Christopher Walken film McBain.

== Personal life and death ==
Compton married Jeanne Sementini on September 28, 1975. His last acting role was in 2002. He retired to Shelter Island, New York, where he died on April 4, 2020, at the age of 94, from COVID-19.

== Filmography ==
Year	Title	Role	Notes
1961	The Outsider	John Bradley	
1991	McBain	President Flynn	

== See also ==
- List of deaths from the COVID-19 pandemic
