= Sharon Gabet =

American actress

- Born: January 13, 1952 (age 74); Fort Wayne, Indiana
- Occupation: Actress
- Years active: 1977–1989

Sharon Gabet (born Sharon Rose Gabet; January 13, 1952 in Fort Wayne, Indiana) is an American actress known for roles on daytime soap operas.

== Television career ==
Gabet is best known for her portrayal of Raven Alexander Whitney on the ABC soap opera The Edge of Night from 1977 to 1984, for which she was nominated for two Daytime Emmy Awards for Outstanding Lead Actress in a Drama Series in 1982 and 1984. She next appeared as Brittany Peterson on Another World (1985–1987) and Melinda Cramer on One Life to Live (1987–1989). In 1982 she also guest starred on an episode of The Love Boat titled "The Man in the Iron Shorts/The Victims/Heavens to Betsy".

== Other pursuits ==
Born and raised in Indiana, Gabet received a degree in nursing from Purdue University, completed the MFA Acting Program at Cornell University and was accepted into the Actors Studio in New York City. She is also a certified yoga teacher trained at Shambhava School of Yoga in Boulder, Colorado. After her third child was born with autism, Gabet began a twenty-year study and exploration of alternative medicine, holistic healing, spirituality, metaphysics, psychology, philosophy, astrology and astronomy. She is the author of two books, Spiritual Magic and From the Raven to the Dove. Gabet was married to actor Larry Joshua from 1984 to 1997 before they were divorced. They had three children. A second marriage to Tom Atwell lasted from 2006 to 2013.
