= Lois Kibbee =

American actress (1922–1993)

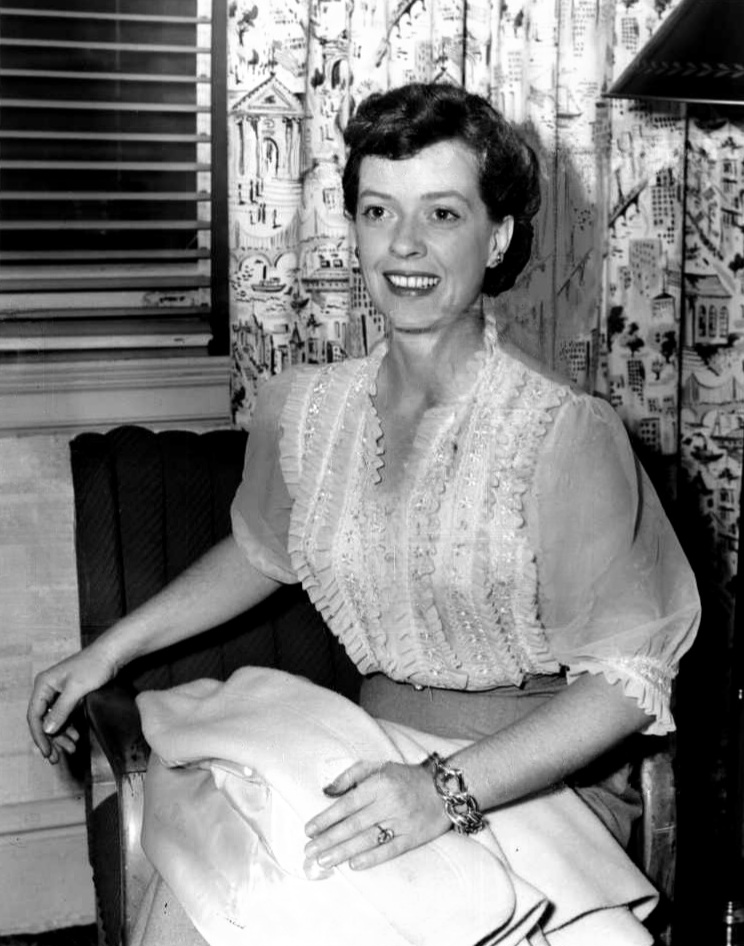
- Kibbee in 1954
- Born: July 13, 1922; Wheeling, West Virginia, U.S.
- Died: October 18, 1993 (aged 71); New York City, U.S.
- Occupation: Actress
- Known for: Daytime soap operas
- Notable work: The Edge of Night
- Father: Milton Kibbee
- Relatives: Guy Kibbee (uncle)

Lois Kibbee (July 13, 1922 – October 18, 1993) was an American actress, known for her television roles.

Kibbee portrayed Geraldine Whitney Saxon on the CBS/ABC daytime soap opera The Edge of Night from 1970 to 1971 and from 1973 until 1984. She also played Emily Moore Matson on NBC's Somerset from 1972 to 1973, and Elizabeth Sanders on ABC's One Life to Live from 1986 to 1989. In film, Kibbee may be best remembered for her role in the 1980 film Caddyshack as Mrs. Smails.

== Early life ==
Kibbee was born in Wheeling, West Virginia. She was the niece of actor Guy Kibbee.

== Career ==
In 1951, Kibbee established Playhouse, Inc., a community theater in El Paso, Texas. She also performed with the Circle Theater in Hollywood and in summer stock theater in Columbus, Ohio, and in Chicago. Kibbee acted on radio on Lux Radio Theatre, Yours Truly, Johnny Dollar, and other programs.

On television, Kibbee's most notable roles were on daytime soap operas. She had a long run as wealthy Geraldine Whitney Saxon on the CBS/ABC daytime soap opera The Edge of Night, where she appeared from 1970 to 1971 and again from 1973 until the show's end in 1984. She also portrayed frosty matriarch Emily Moore Matson on NBC's Somerset from 1972 to 1973, a character whose eccentric family was involved in a murder storyline centered on "Jingles the Clown". Later in her career she played powerful matriarch Elizabeth Sanders on ABC's One Life to Live from 1986 to 1989.

Kibbee was also a writer on The Edge of Night. She co-wrote the book The Bennett Playbill about the life of the Bennett acting family, particularly film, stage and television star, Joan Bennett. She also was the ghostwriter for The Christine Jorgensen Story.

While Henry Slesar was head writer for the CBS soap Capitol, Kibbee briefly contributed a few scripts as well. Kibbee had been writing a book about her family's history as performers at the time of her death.

== Awards and nominations ==
Kibbee was nominated for a Daytime Emmy Award for Outstanding Supporting Actress in a Drama Series in 1979, 1980, 1981 and 1984 and Outstanding Writing Team in 1982 with Slesar.

== Death ==
Kibbee died of a brain tumor on October 18, 1993, at Memorial Sloan Kettering Cancer Center in Manhattan.

== Filmography ==
Year	Title	Role	Notes
1980	Caddyshack	Mrs. Smails	
