= Perry Mason (radio series) =

- John Larkin as Perry Mason and Joan Alexander as Della Street
- Other names: The New Adventures of Perry Mason
- Genre: Crime serial
- Running time: 15 minutes
- Country of origin: USA
- Language: English
- Syndicates: CBS Radio
- TV adaptations: The Edge of Night
- Starring: Bartlett Robinson; Santos Ortega; Donald Briggs; John Larkin; Gertrude Warner; Joan Alexander
- Announcer: Bob Dixon, Alan Kent, Richard Stark
- Created by: Erle Stanley Gardner (original stories)
- Written by: Irving Vendig
- Directed by: Art Hanna, Carlo deAngelo, Carl Eastman, Hoyt Allen, Ralph Butler
- Produced by: Tom McDermott
- Executive producer: Leslie Harris
- Recording studio: New York City
- Original release: October 18, 1943 – December 30, 1955
- No. of episodes: 3000
- Sponsored by: General Foods, Tide
- Podcast: stream from Archive.org

Perry Mason is a radio crime serial based on the novels of Erle Stanley Gardner. Broadcast weekdays on CBS Radio from 1943 to 1955, the series was adapted into The Edge of Night which ran on television for an additional 30 years.

== Production ==
The 15-minute continuing series Perry Mason aired weekdays October 18, 1943 – December 30, 1955, on CBS Radio. Geared more towards action than courtroom drama, it mixed mystery and soap opera, with attorney Perry Mason sometimes even exchanging gunfire with criminals.

Erle Stanley Gardner's literary success with the Perry Mason novels convinced Warner Bros. to try its hand, unsuccessfully, with some motion pictures. However, the Perry Mason radio show stayed on the air for 12 years.

As The Edge of Night, it ran for another 30 years on television, but Gardner disliked the proposed daytime television version due to a lack of his own creative control. He ultimately withheld his endorsement of the daytime TV show, forcing the name change.

== Cast ==
The actors portraying Mason switched frequently over the first three years of the show's run, starting with Bartlett Robinson, then followed by Santos Ortega and Donald Briggs. John Larkin took over the starring role March 31, 1947, and portrayed Perry Mason until the end of the series.

Larkin played the equivalent character on The Edge of Night, Mike Karr.

The guest cast included Mercedes McCambridge. Principal cast members are listed in order of portrayal.

- Perry Mason
  Bartlett Robinson
  Santos Ortega
  Donald Briggs
  John Larkin (1947–1955)
- Paul Drake
  Matt Crowley
  Charles Webster
  Joe Lund
- Della Street
  Gertrude Warner
  Jan Miner
  Joan Alexander
- Lieutenant Tragg
  Mandel Kramer
  Frank Dane

== Transition to television ==
Radio's Perry Mason has more in common, in all but name, with the daytime serial The Edge of Night than the subsequent prime-time Perry Mason television show. As many radio serials moved to television, so was to be the destiny of Perry Mason. However, Gardner disagreed with the direction of the new show and pulled his support. CBS insisted that Mason be given a love interest to placate daytime soap opera audiences, but Gardner flatly refused to take Mason in that direction. The sponsor, Procter & Gamble hired the writers and staff of the Perry Mason radio series, the show was retooled, and it became The Edge of Night. The characters and setting were renamed.

CBS would eventually acquiesce to Gardner's vision and greenlight an official Perry Mason TV adaptation in 1957. Since this version would air in prime time, it was not bound to the conventions of daytime soaps and would more closely resemble a conventional courtroom drama. Two actors who played Perry Mason on radio, Bartlett Robinson and John Larkin, appeared in episodes of the CBS-TV series, Perry Mason, starring Raymond Burr as the title character.

Both The Edge of Night and Perry Mason would go on to success in television: the prime time Perry Mason ran for nine seasons (and would be revived in a series of television films in the 1980s that would run until sometime after Burr's death). The Edge of Night would run for 28 years on daytime television.

== Broadcast history ==
| Air dates | Time slot |
|---|---|
| October 18, 1943 – March 31, 1944 | 2:45 p.m. ET |
| April 3, 1944 – March 23, 1945 | 2:30 p.m. ET |
| March 26, 1945 – December 30, 1955 | 2:15 p.m. ET |

== See also ==
- Perry Mason (TV series), an American legal drama broadcast on CBS Television 1957–1966
