= Richard Shoberg =

American actor and writer (born 1950)

Richard Shoberg (also credited as Dick Shoberg, born March 1, 1950, in Grand Rapids, Michigan) is an American actor and writer.

He first appeared in soap operas as Mitch Farmer on Somerset from 1971 to 1972. After leaving Somerset he returned to daytime as the Kevin Jameson #1 on The Edge of Night from 1972 to 1975.

He is married with 2 children and resides in New York.

Shoberg's most famous role to date is former football player-turned-restaurateur Tom Cudahy on All My Children, a part he played from July 1977 to April 1995, with a return for some appearances between 2004 and 2005.

Shoberg played for more than ten years until 2019 Inspector Ascher in off-Broadway's longest running show, Perfect Crime.

== Credits ==
- All My Children (as Tom Cudahy) (wrote scripts during the 2007–2008 Writers Guild of America strike)
- CSI: Miami
- Law & Order: Special Victims Unit
- Law & Order: Criminal Intent
- The Silence
- The Edge of Night (as Kevin Jameson)
- Somerset
- White Collar
