= Joel Crothers =

American actor

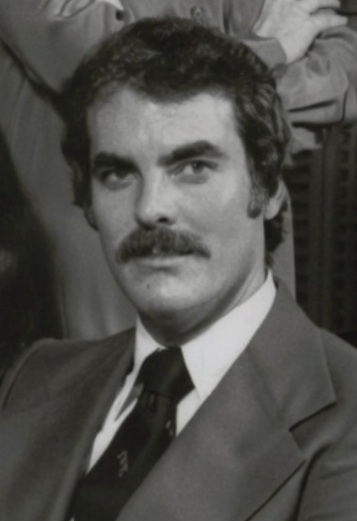
- Crothers in The Edge of Night, 1978
- Born: Joel Anthony Crothers; January 28, 1941; Cincinnati, Ohio, U.S.
- Died: November 6, 1985 (aged 44); Los Angeles, California, U.S.
- Education: Birch Wathen School; Harvard University
- Occupation: Actor
- Years active: 1954—1985

Joel Anthony Crothers (January 28, 1941 – November 6, 1985) was an American actor. His credits primarily included stage and television work, including a number of soap opera roles, the best known being Miles Cavanaugh on The Edge of Night, whom he played for eight years. He was also known for his roles as Joe Haskell and Lieutenant Nathan Forbes on Dark Shadows, Ken Stevens No. 2 on The Secret Storm, and pianist/newspaper editor Julian Cannell on Somerset.

== Early years ==
Born January 28, 1941, in Cincinnati and raised in New York City, Joel Crothers graduated from Birch Wathen School in 1958. His passion for performing emerged at the early age of nine. Crothers auditioned and won a role on the CBS religious TV series Lamp Unto My Feet. At the time, his father, George Crothers, was a production supervisor on the show. Unbeknownst to him, his son auditioned for the show under a different name, apparently done as a practical joke. Nevertheless, by the age of twelve, he was taking Broadway bows alongside Burgess Meredith for his stage debut in 1954 in The Remarkable Mr. Pennypacker at the Coronet Theatre.

== Career ==
During the 1950s and 1960s, Crothers made guest appearances on numerous prime-time programs, including Alfred Hitchcock Presents, The Defenders, Have Gun – Will Travel, Rescue 8, Zane Grey Theater, Studio One, Playhouse 90, Kraft Television Theatre, and Goodyear Playhouse. His later daytime television credits included First Ladies Diaries: Martha Washington.

Crothers was cast in the 1960 episode, "3-7-77", of the syndicated anthology series, Death Valley Days hosted by Stanley Andrews. He played Jim Badger, a young man who tangles with corrupt lawmen and vigilantes.

Crothers graduated from Harvard University, Phi Beta Kappa, in 1962. In 1966, he returned to Broadway in a starring role opposite Joan Van Ark in Barefoot in the Park, which he worked on simultaneously with his stint on Dark Shadows. From 1966 to 1969, he played Joe Haskell, boyfriend of Carolyn Stoddard (Nancy Barrett) and later boyfriend of Maggie Evans (Kathryn Leigh Scott). During the 1795 storyline, he played Lt. Nathan Forbes, a devious naval officer who blackmailed his way into the Collins family. After Nathan Forbes was killed off, Crothers's main character, Joe, was bitten by the vampire Angélique Bouchard Collins (Lara Parker) and placed under her thrall. Haunted by the apparition of his deceased cousin Tom Jennings (Don Briscoe), who was a victim of Angélique, and unable to cope with the revelation that Tom's twin brother Chris (also played by Briscoe) was a werewolf, Joe slowly lost touch with reality and was sent to a mental hospital by Maggie. He was never seen again and was mentioned only once in a later episode.

From 1969 to 1971, Crothers played twice-married cheat and liar Ken Stevens No. 2 on the CBS serial The Secret Storm. Several of his 1971 episodes have been preserved by UCLA's TV Archives, though the magnetic VHS tapes are awaiting digital transfer and are not available for viewing by the public. From 1972 to 1976, he played concert pianist-turned-newspaper editor Julian Cannell on Somerset. From 1977 to 1984, he made it big with another soap opera role: Dr. Miles Cavanaugh on ABC's The Edge of Night, for which he was twice nominated as Outstanding Lead Actor in a Drama Series at the Daytime Emmy Awards in 1979 and 1984. He played that role until the series went off the air on December 28, 1984. In 1985, his final role was on Santa Barbara as both Jack Lee, a prominent attorney, and his villainous lookalike cousin Jerry Cooper, who had locked Jack in a dungeon and was posing as him.

Crothers' soap opera fame helped draw attention to the ground-breaking off-Broadway play Torch Song Trilogy. The play made major stars of its writer (and lead performer) Harvey Fierstein and castmates Estelle Getty and Matthew Broderick—but when it premiered, Crothers was better known than any of them and received star billing on posters, playbills, and even the tickets. Fierstein played Arnold Beckoff, a world-weary drag queen; Crothers played Arnold's bisexual lover, Ed Reiss. He left the cast when Torch Song transferred to Broadway. Brian Kerwin played Ed in the 1988 film version.

== Personal life ==
Crothers was openly gay among co-stars and others in the entertainment industry, but was closeted publicly and was even engaged to his good friend, actress Veleka Gray, at the time of his death. They became close friends on the set when she joined the final season of Somerset, where they played the lovers Julian Cannell and Vicki Paisley.

== Death ==
During his last appearances on Santa Barbara, he was by then growing very ill. On November 6, 1985, Crothers died from AIDS-related lymphoma in Los Angeles at the age of 44. His remains were cremated and scattered in Lake George, New York.

== Selected filmography ==
- Alfred Hitchcock Presents (1961) (Season 7 Episode 6: "Beta Delta Gamma") as Robert
