= Mike Karr =

- The Edge of Night character
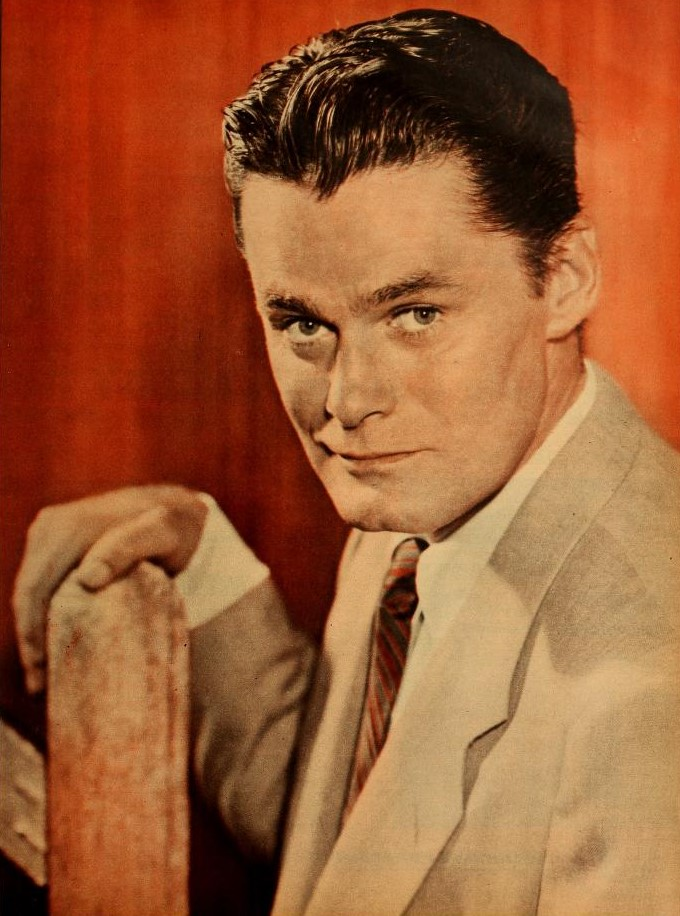
- John Larkin originated the role of Mike Karr from 1956 to 1961.
- Portrayed by: John Larkin (1956–1961); Laurence Hugo (1961–1971); Forrest Compton (1971–1984)
- Duration: 1956–1984
- First appearance: April 2, 1956
- Last appearance: December 28, 1984
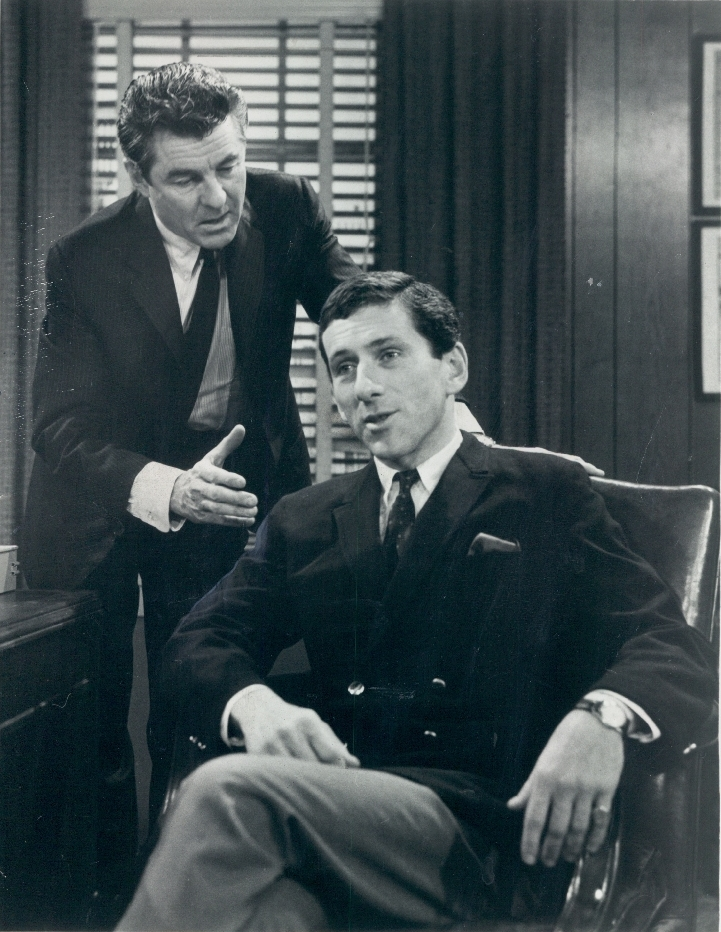
- Laurence Hugo (left) portrayed Mike Karr from 1962 to 1971 (with Barry Newman as John Barnes, right).
In-universe information
- Wife: Sara Lane; Nancy Pollock
- Daughters: Laurie Ann Karr
- Adoptive sons: Timmy Farraday
- Grandsons: John Victor Dallas

Mike Karr is a fictional character in the long-running daytime soap opera The Edge of Night.

A tireless crime-fighter, Karr was introduced as a cop finishing law school. This character evolved from the earlier Perry Mason character on radio. He then progressed to the District Attorney's office as an ADA, started his own practice as a defense attorney for several years, then became DA of Monticello. Karr was played by three actors: John Larkin (radio's Perry Mason) from the show's debut in April 1956 to October 1961, Laurence Hugo from November 1961 to June 1, 1971, then Forrest Compton from June 2, 1971 until the show ended on December 28, 1984.

Mike Karr was the only character on The Edge of Night to last the entire run of the series. Mike appeared in both the premiere episode April 2, 1956, and the final telecast on December 28, 1984.
