= Ann Flood =

American actress (1932–2022)

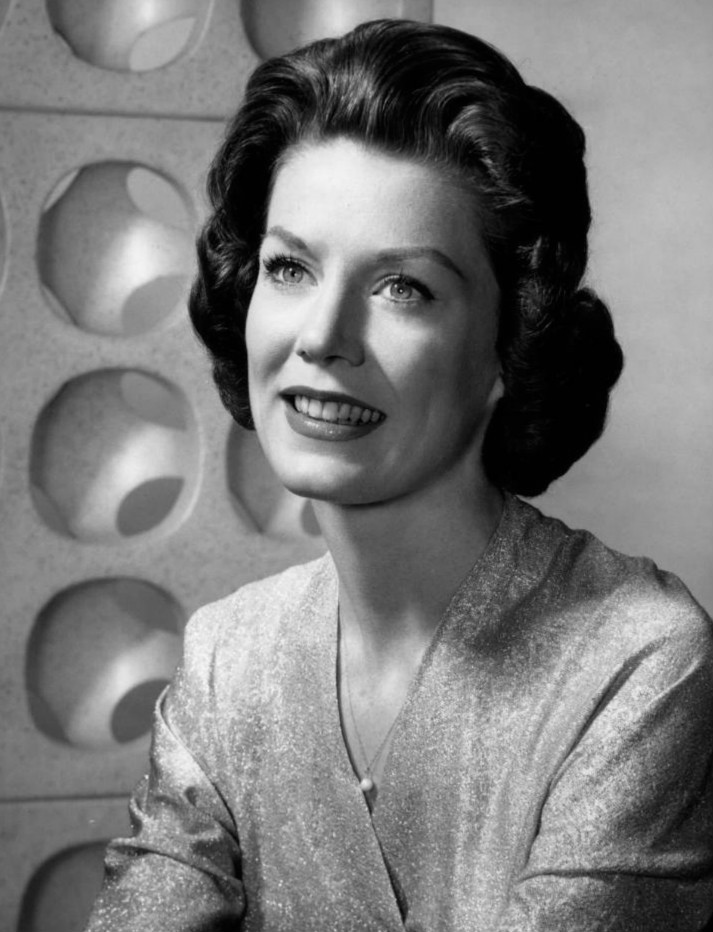
- Flood in 1963
- Born: Maryanne Elizabeth Ott; November 12, 1932; Jamaica, Queens, New York, U.S.
- Died: October 7, 2022 (aged 89); Stamford, Connecticut, U.S.
- Occupation: Actress
- Years active: 1954–1993
- Spouse: Herb Granath (m. 1952; died 2019)
- Children: 4

Ann Flood (born Maryanne Elizabeth Ott; November 12, 1932 – October 7, 2022) was an American actress, best known for her role as journalist and author Nancy Pollock Karr in the soap opera The Edge of Night, a role she began in 1962. Flood portrayed the show's heroine for 22 years, witnessing the show's transition from live to taped broadcasts and its move from CBS to ABC.

== Early years ==
Flood was born in Jamaica, Queens, New York, the daughter Mr. and Mrs. Frank Ott. She graduated from Bay Shore High School with a scholarship in merchandising and buying to a junior college in New England, but a summer job changed her plans. She worked as a receptionist at a beach club where many of the members were actors who put on shows for the community. One of them invited her to take a small part in a play, and that sparked Flood's interest in acting. She took lessons from a dramatic coach and began to learn more about the profession from other actors. She said that changing her name for acting was "purely psychological. Maryanne Ott is not as euphonious as Ann Flood."

== Career ==
Flood had notable roles on Broadway, making her debut in the 1954 musical Kismet, in which she began as a show girl but was promoted to a singing part when two cast members became sick. She went on to play opposite Don Ameche in Holiday for Lovers (1957). Her television debut came earlier, in a 1952 live production of the W. S. Gilbert play, The Fortune Hunter, for WOR-TV.

Flood became a regular performer on golden age live TV shows, including Sergeant Bilko, Armstrong Circle Theatre, Kraft Theatre, and The Philco Television Playhouse. She was also known for roles in various commercials, including those for Good Seasons salad dressing, Newport cigarettes, Ivory Snow detergent, and Sterling beer. Before starting on The Edge of Night, she played the leading role of another journalist, Elizabeth "Liz" Fraser Allen in the soap opera From These Roots (1958–61).

In The Edge of Night, Nancy's marriage to Mike Karr remains as one of the longest in soap history. Nancy and Mike had no children of their own, but the character of Laurie (Mike's daughter by his first wife Sara) came to consider Nancy as her mother. Flood continued in the role through the series' finale in 1984, by which time she was the show's longest-serving cast member.

For her work on the show, Flood was twice nominated for the Daytime Emmy Award in the category of Outstanding Lead Actress in a Drama Series, in 1982 and 1984.

After Edge of Night, Flood continued to act in daytime dramas. She was cast in a succession of shorter-term and recurring roles, playing Ella Hobbs, a villain on Search for Tomorrow, who tried to kill the show's leading character, Joanne, and played a variety of society matrons on Another World (Rose Livingston, 1986–1987), One Life to Live (Mrs. Guthrie, 1991), and As the World Turns, recurring from 1992 to 1993 as business executive Ruth Mansfield. In 1987, she joined the cast of All My Children playing the recurring role of Bitsy Davidson, Cecily's snooty mother, and was briefly under contract to the show. Her last appearance aired in January 1990.

Other work included guest-starring roles in prime-time TV programs such as The Cosby Show, and a role in the 1988 feature film, Mystic Pizza.

== Personal life and death ==
Flood was married since 1952 to sportscaster and media network executive Herb Granath until his death in 2019. She had three sons and one daughter.

Flood died in Stamford, Connecticut, on October 7, 2022, five weeks before her 90th birthday.
