= List of Another World characters =

This is a list of some of the major characters that have appeared in the soap opera Another World, which originally aired from May 4, 1964, to June 25, 1999.

== A ==
Joyce Abernathy
Played by Rena Sofer, 1987
Dave Adama
Played by John Mattey, 1996–1999
Police officer.
Wayne Addison
Played by Edmund Hashim, 1969; Robert Milli, 1969–1970
Tom Albini
Played by Pierrino Mascorino, 1970–1971; Peter Brandon, 1979
Mark Allen
Played by Bill Shanks, 1991; Nick Gregory. 1991
Ms. Margaret Allen
Played by Christopher Norris, 1998
Kevin Anderson
Played by Jamie Goodwin, 1991–1993
Dean Andrews
Played by James Sutorius, 1982
Frank Andrews
Played by Peter Brandon, 1964–1965
Willie Armstrong
Played by Giancarlo Esposito, 1982

== B ==
Blair Baker
Played by Kathy Carrier, 1995–1996; Bridget White, 1996
Rusty Bakersfield
Played by Jon Curry, 1997
Tito Banacek
Played by Tony Templeton, 1998; Troy Hall, 1998–1999
Brian Bancroft
Played by Paul Stevens, 1977–1985
Ted Bancroft
Played by Eric Roberts, 1977; Richard Backus, 1979; Luke Reilly, 1983–1984
Brenda Barlowe
Played by Betty White, 1988
Greg Barnard
Played by Ned Schmidtke, 1977–1978
Ken Baxter
Played by William Prince, 1964–1965
Laura Baxter
Played by Augusta Dabney, 1964–1965
Tom Baxter
Played by Nicholas Pryor, 1964
Reena Bellman Cook
Played by Carla Borelli, 1979–1980
Striker Bellman
Played by Clifton James, 1980
Lord Peter Belton
Played by Michael Tylo, 1980
Taylor Benson
Played by Christine Andreas, 1990–1991
Doctor.
Ed Berns
Played by Eugene Smith, 1986
Roy Bingham
Played by Morgan Freeman, 1982–1984
Doctor.
Ellen Bishop Grant
Played by Georgann Johnson, 1970
Pamela Blair
Played by Bonnie Broderick (1994)
Mitch Blake
Played by William Gray Espy, 1979–1982, 1986–1990
Russell Boyd
Played by Jay Bontatibus, 1996
Hunter Bradshaw
Played by Robert Sedgwick, 1984–1985
Cindy Brooke
Played by Kim Rhodes, 1996–1999
Leonard Brooks
Played by Joseph Maher, 1975–1978; John Horton, 1978; John Tillinger, 1978–1980, 1981–1982
Antoinette "Toni" Burrell
Played by Rhonda Ross Kendrick, 1997–1999
A police officer. Engaged to Chris Madison. Daughter of Etta Mae Burrell and her late husband, Harold. Has three other siblings: Judy, Edmund and K.C.
Etta Mae Burrell
Played by Elain R. Graham, 1996–1999
Owner of the Lucky Lady. Was married to Harold Burrell. Mother of five children: Judy, Edmund, Toni and K.C. Burrell.
Judy Burrell
Played by Darlene Love, 1993; Saundra McClain, 1993–1995; Kim Sykes, 1995–1996
Kineisha "K.C." Burrell
Played by Persia White, 1999
Reporter. Attending Harvard University in the fall of 1999. Youngest child of Etta Mae Burrell and her late husband, Harold Burrell. She has three older siblings: Judy, Edmund and Toni.

== C ==
Karen Campbell
Played by Laurie Bartram, 1978–79
Joe Carlino
Played by Joseph Barbara, 1995–99
Paulina Cory Carlino
Played by Cali Timmins, 1990–91; Judi Evans, 1991–99
Sofia Carlino
Played by Dahlia Salem, 1995–98
Tony Carlino
Played by Jason Culp, 1997
Tony Carlisle
Played by John H Brennan, 1986–87;
Czaja Carnek
Played by Ving Rhames, 1986
Elliott Carrington
Played by Joe Hannaham, 1972; James Douglas, 1972–74
Iris Carrington
Played by Beverlee McKinsey, 1972–80; Carmen Duncan, 1988–94
Christy Carson
Played by Patti D'Arbanville, 1992–93
Dustin Carter
Played by Vince Williams, 1996–97
Rafe Carter
Played by Philip Sterling, 1970–71
Lucas Castigliano
Played by John Aprea, 1989–92
Chris Chapin
Played by Don Scardino, 1985–86
Ted Clark
Played by Stephen Bolster, 1971–73
Emily Cole
Played by Joanna Merlin, 1981–82
Doctor.
Bridget Connell
Played by Barbara Berjer, 1985–98
Kevin Cooke
Played by Lee Patterson, 1979–80
Captain Billy Cooper
Played by Ruben Santiago-Hudson, 1990–93; David L. King, 1993-1994; Eddie Earl Hatch, 1994-1995
Adam Cory
Played by Ed Fry, 1986–89
Blaine Ewing Cory
Played by Laura Malone, 1978–84; Judy Dewey, 1984–85
Jasmine Cory
Played by Alexandra, Jacqueline, and Sydney Lademan, 1999
Mac Cory
Played by Robert Emhardt, 1973–74; Douglass Watson, 1974–89
Maggie Cory
Played by Robyn Griggs, 1993–95; Jodi Lyn O'Keefe, 1995; Lisa Brenner, 1995–96, Julie Nathanson 1996
Matthew Cory
Played by Matthew Maienczyk, 1980–1982; Daniel Dale, 1986–87; Matt Crane, 1988–97, 1998–99; Brian Krause, 1997–98; Jeff Phillips, 1998
Neal Cory
Played by Robert Lupone, 1985–86
Rachel Cory Hutchins
Played by Robin Strasser, 1967–71, 1972; Maggie Impert 1971–72; Victoria Wyndham, 1972–99
Sandy Cory
Played by Christopher Rich, 1981–85; Stephen Bogardus, 1993
Wally Curtin Jr.
Played by Chris Ombramonti, 1971; Scott Firestone, 1971–72; Jason Gladstone, 1972–74; Dennis McKiernan, 1974–75
Walter Curtin, Sr.
Played by Val Dufour, 1967–72

== D ==
Derek Dane
Played by Kevin Carrigan, 1989–1990
Henry Davenport
Played by Theodore Bikel, 1982–83
Pamela "Pammy" Davis
Played by Pamela Toll, 1970
Lenore Curtin Delaney
Played by Judith Barcroft, 1966–1971; Susan Sullivan, 1971–1975
Robert Delaney
Played by Nicolas Coster, 1970, 1972–1976, 1980, 1989
Cecile DePoulignac
Played by Susan Keith, 1979–1981; Nancy Frangione, 1981–1984, 1986, 1989, 1993, 1995–1996
Elena DePoulignac
Played by Christina Pickles, 1977–1979; Maeve McGuire, 1982–1983
Countess.
Lorna Devon
Played by Alicia Coppola, 1991–1994; Robin Christopher, 1994–1997
Ernie Downs
Played by Harry Bellaver, 1967–1971
Mitchell Dru
Played by Geoffrey Lumb, 1964–1971
Jason Dunlap
Played by Warren Burton, 1980–1982
Martha Dunlay
Played by Carol Lynley, 1989
Judge.
Royal Dunning
Played by Mike Minor, 1983–1984
Doctor.
Meredith Dunston
Played by Joan Rivers, 1997
Justine Duvalier
Played by Victoria Wyndham, 1995

== E ==
Bunny Eberhart
Played by Marcia McCabe, 1995
Al Edwards
Played by Arthur French, 1986–1990
Julie Ann Edwards
Played by Tara Wilson, 1986–1989
Zack Edwards
Played by James Pickens Jr., 1986–1990
Sam Egan
Played by Drew Snyder, 1982
Curtis Eldon
Played by William Bogert, 1981–1982
Carla Elliott
Played by Cynthia Leigh Young, 1994–1999
Police officer.
Courtney Evans
Played by Bellamy Young, 1995; Stina Nielsen, 1995–1996
Doctor.
Dee Evans
Played by Katie Rich, 1985–1986
Catlin Ewing
Played by Thomas Ian Griffith, 1984–1987
Clarice Ewing
Played by Gail Brown, 1975–1986
Cory Ewing
Played by Carmine Rizzo, 1977–1985
Jeanne Ewing
Played by Betty Miller, 1983
Larry Ewing
Played by Richard J. Porter, 1978–1986

== F ==
Danny Fargo
Played by Antony Ponzini, 1966–1967
Gil Fenton
Played by Tom Wiggin, 1983–1984
Marie Fenton
Played by Lenka Peterson, 1983
Vera Finley
Played by Carol Mayo Jenkins, 1977
Frank Fisk
Played by William H. Macy, 1982
Alexandra "Alli" Fowler
Played by Lindsay Lohan, 1996–1997; Alicia Leigh Willis, 1998–1999
Loretta Fowler
Played by Rosemary Murphy, 1988
Sam Fowler
Played by Robert Kelker-Kelly, 1987–1990; Thomas Gibson, 1990; Danny Markel, 1990–1991; Brian Lane Green, 1991–1993
Alice Frame
Played by Jacqueline Courtney, 1964–1975, 1984–1985, 1989; Susan Harney, 1975–1979; Wesley Ann Pfenning, 1979; Vana Tribbey, 1981; Linda Borgeson 1981–1982
Dean Frame
Played by Ricky Paull Goldin, 1990–1993, 1994–1995, 1998
Emma Frame Ordway
Played by Beverlee McKinsey, 1972; Tresa Hughes, 1975–76; Elizabeth Ashley, 1990
Evan Frame
Played by Charles Grant, 1988–1990; Eric Scott Woods, 1994–1995
Frankie Frame
Played by Alice Barrett, 1989–1996, 1999
Gwen Frame
Played by Dorothy Lyman, 1976–1980, 1989
Jamie Frame
Played by Seth Holzlein, 1970-1971; Aiden McNulty, 1971–1973; Brad Bedford, 1973; Tyler Mead, 1973; Robert Doran, 1973–1978; Tim Holcomb, 1978–1979; Richard Bekins, 1979–1983; Stephen Yates, 1983–1985; Laurence Lau, 1986–1990; Russell Todd, 1990–1993
Doctor.
Janice Frame
Played by Victoria Thompson, 1972–1974; Christine Jones, 1978–1980, 1989
Jason Frame
Played by Chris Robinson, 1987–1989
Sally Frame
Played by Cathy Greene, 1975–1978; Julie Philips, 1979–1980; Jennifer Runyon, 1981–1983; Dawn Benz, 1983; Mary Page Keller, 1983–1985; Taylor Miller, 1985–1986
Sharlene Frame
Played by Laurie Heineman, 1975–1977; Anna Kathryn Holbrook, 1988–1991, 1993–1997, 1999
Steve Frame
Played by George Reinholt, 1968–1975, 1989; David Canary, 1981–1983
Steven Frame
Played by John Nash, 1989–1994; Christopher Conroy, 1994–1995; Spencer Treat Clark, 1995–1997, 1998–1999; Michael Angarano, 1998; Jimmy McQuaid, 1998
Vince Frame
Played by Jay Morran, 1978–1979
Willis Frame
Played by John Fitzpatrick, 1975–1976; Leon Russom, 1976–1980
Ilsa Fredericks
Played by Gwyda Donhowe, 1981–1982

== G ==
Felicia Gallant
Played by Linda Dano, 1983–1999
Brett Gardener
Played by Colleen Dion, 1992–1994
Edward Gerard
Played by John Saxon, 1985–1986
Amy Gifford
Played by Christine Jones, 1977
David Gilchrist
Played by David Ackroyd, 1974–1977
Doctor.
Alan Glaser
Played by David O'Brien, 1986–1987
Doctor.
Louise Goddard
Played by Anne Meacham, 1972–1980, 1981–1982
Beatrice Gordon
Played by Jacqueline Brookes, 1975–1976
Ray Gordon
Played by Ted Shackelford, 1975–1976; Gary Carpenter, 1977
Lisa Grady
Played by Joanna Going, 1987–1989
Alex Gregory
Played by James Congdon, 1965
Bert Gregory
Played by William Smith, 1965; House Jameson, 1965
Doctor.
Jerry Grove
Played by Michael Garfield, 1979–1980; Kevin Conway, 1980; Paul Tinder, 1981
Scott Guthrie
Played by Bronson Picket, 1998

== H ==
David Halliday
Played by David Andrew MacDonald, 1999
Rick Halloway
Played by Tony Cummings, 1980–1982
Taylor Halloway
Played by Ron Harper, 1980
Ed Harding
Played by Howard Rollins, 1982
Quinn Harding
Played by Petronia Paley, 1981–1987
Herb Harris
Played by David Schramm, 1984
Grant Harrison
Played by Dack Rambo, 1990–1991; Mark Pinter, 1991–1999
Kelsey Harrison
Played by Kaitlin Hopkins, 1992–1994
Kirkland Harrison
Played by Austin and Evan Tennenbaum, 1994–1995; Kyle and Ryan Pepi, 1995; Connor Rademaker, 1995–1996; Sean Rademaker, 1996–1999
Ruth Harrison
Played by Cynthia Harris, 1992; Tanny McDonald, 1993
Ryan Harrison
Played by Paul Michael Valley, 1990–1997
Spencer Harrison
Played by David Hedison, 1991–1995
Vic Hastings
Played by John Considine, 1974–1976
Eric Hilker
Played by Michael Ingram, 1964–1965
Doctor
Ada Hobson
Played by Constance Ford, 1967–1992
Charlie Hobson
Played by Fred J. Scollay, 1977–1980
Denny Hobson
Played by James Horan, 1981–1982
Leigh Hobson
Played by Christopher Knight, 1980–1981
Greg Houston
Played by Christopher Cousins, 1986–1987
Clara Hudson
Played by Scotty Bloch, 1987 (two episodes); Kate Wilkinson, 1987–1989; Peg Small, 1995
Gregory Hudson
Played by Jude Sullivan, 1991; Alex Bowen, 1996; Morgan Hodgen, 1996 Chris Marquette, 1996–1997
John Hudson
Played by David Forsyth, 1987–1997
Marley Hudson
Played by Ellen Wheeler, 1984–1986, 1998–1999; Anne Heche, 1987–1991; Jensen Buchanan, 1991–1994, 1997–1998
Michael Hudson
Played by Kale Browne, 1986–1992, 1995–1998
Nick Hudson
Played by Justin Chambers, 1995; Kevin McClatchy, 1995–1996; Mark Mortimer, 1996–1999
Carl Hutchins
Played by Charles Keating, 1983–1986, 1991–1999
Perry Hutchins
Played by David Oliver, 1983–1985

== J ==
Neil Johansson
Played by James Hyde, 1997
Caroline Johnson
Played by Rue McClanahan, 1970–1971
Neil Johnson
Played by John Getz, 1974–1975
Sam Johnson
Played by Rawleigh Moreland, 1989
Sheriff.
Shelby Johnson
Played by Tanya Clarke, 1998–1999
David Jordan
Played by Don Stephenson, 1993–1995
Ken Jordan
Played by Lewis Arlt, 1990–1991

== K ==
Hank Kent
Played by Steve Fletcher, 1992–1994
Susan Kerry
Played by Jewel Turner, 1991
Patricia Kirkland
Played by Janine Turner, 1986–1987
Sylvie Kosloff
Played by Leora Dana, 1978–1979
Dana Kramer
Played by Michelle Hurd, 1991–1997; Cassandra Creech, 1994; Kim Hawthorne, 1997, PaSean Wilson, 1997
Marshall Lincoln Kramer III
Played by Randy Brooks, 1994–1995; André De Shields, 1995–1996
Nina Kreiter
Alice Liu, 1998

== L ==
Theresa Lamonte
Played by Nancy Marchand, 1976
Theo Lane
Played by Norman Parker, 1982
Scott LaSalle
Played by Hank Cheyne, 1986–1988
Jesse Lawrence
Played by Dondre Whitfield, 1989–1990
Reuben Lawrence
Played by Clayton Prince, 1988–1990
Veronica "Ronnie" Lawrence
Played by B.J. Jefferson, 1989–1990, 1991 Rhonda Jensen, 1986–1987
Peggy Lazarus
Played by Rebecca Hollen, 1986–1987
Cindy Lee
Played by Dee Ann Sexton, 1980
Fingers Leroy
Played by Ray Xifo, 1986
Helga Lindeman
Played by Helen Stenborg, 1977–1978
Zane Lindquist
Played by Patrick Tovatt, 1985–1986
Rose Livingston
Played by Ann Flood, 1987
Donna Love
Played by Anna Stuart, 1983–1986, 1989–1999; Philece Sampler, 1987–1989; Sofia Landon Geier, 1991, 1993
Nicole Love
Played by Kim Morgan Greene, 1983–1984; Laurie Landry, 1986–1987; Anne Marie Howard, 1987–1989
Peter Love
Played by John Hutton, 1982–1984, Christopher Holder, 1985; Marcus Smythe, 1985–1987
Reginald Love
Played by John Considine, 1986–1988
Lahoma Lucas
Played by Ann Wedgeworth, 1967–1970
Sam Lucas
Played by Jordan Charney, 1967–1970, 1973–1974
Philip Lyons
Played by Robert Gentry, 1979–1981

== M ==
Chris Madison
Played by Eric Morgan Stuart, 1996–1999
Rick Madison
Played by Gerald Anthony, 1991–1992
Abel Marsh
Played by Joe Morton, 1983–1984
Doctor.
Drew Marsten
Played by Denny Albee, 1988
Lily Mason
Played by Jackée Harry, 1983–1986
Bill Matthews
Played by Joseph Gallison, 1964–1969
Grandma Matthews
Played by Vera Allen, 1964
Janet Matthews
Played by Liza Chapman, 1964–1966
Jim Matthews
Played by John Beal, 1964; Leon Janney, 1964; Shepperd Strudwick, 1964–1969; Hugh Marlowe, 1969–1982
Liz Matthews
Played by Sarah Cunningham, 1964; Audra Lindley, 1964–1969; Nancy Wickwire, 1969–1971; Irene Dailey, 1974–1986, 1987–1994
Mary Matthews
Played by Virginia Dwyer, 1964–1975
Melissa Palmer Matthews
Played by Carol Roux, 1964–1970
Olivia Matthews
Played by Allison Hossack, 1989–1992
Russ Matthews
Played by Joey Trent, 1964, 1965; Sam Groom, 1966–1971; Robert Hover, 1971–1972; David Bailey, 1973–1978; 1979–1981; 1989; 1992
Doctor.
Ed McClain
Frank Runyeon (1994)
Burt McGowan
Played by William Russ, 1977–1978; Joseph Hindy, 1979
Gil McGowan
Played by Charles Durning, 1972; Dolph Sweet, 1972–1977
Police Chief.
Nancy McGowan
Played by Jane Cameron, 1984–1987, 1989, 1993
Tim McGowan
Played by Christopher Allport, 1973–1974
Ben McKinnon
Played by Richard Steen, 1984–1985
Cheryl McKinnon
Played by Kristen Marie, 1986–1988
Jake McKinnon
Played by Tom Eplin, 1985–1986, 1988–1999; Ian Boyd, 1998 {flashbacks}
Kathleen McKinnon
Played by Julie Osburn, 1984–1986, 1989, 1991
M.J. McKinnon
Played by Kathleen Layman, 1984–1986; Sally Spencer, 1986–1987
Mary McKinnon
Played by Denise Alexander, 1986–1989
Vicky McKinnon
Played by Ellen Wheeler, 1985–1986; Rhonda Lewin, 1986; Anne Heche, 1987–1991; Jensen Buchanan, 1991–1999
Vince McKinnon
Played by Jack Ryland, 1984–1985; Duke Stroud, 1986; Robert Hogan, 1987–1989, 1991
Gabe McNamara
Played by John Bolger, 1995–1997
Gloria Metcalf
Played by Rosetta LeNoire, 1972
Linda Metcalf
Played by Vera Moore, 1972–1981
Laurie Michaels
Played by Kaili Vernoff, 1995
Sharon Miller
Played by Alberta Grant, 1975
Sara Montaigne
Played by Missy Hughes, 1986–1987
Tyrone Montgomery
Played by Henry Simmons, 1997–1999
Hannah Moore
Played by Jennifer Lien, 1991–1992
Helen Moore
Played by Nancy Douglas, 1965-1966; Helen Dumas, 1966; Muriel Williams, 1966–1968, 1970–1976
Lenore Moore
Played by Judith Barcroft, 1966–1971; Susan Sullivan, 1971-1975
Reuben Moreno
Played by José Ferrer, 1983
Adrienne Morrow
Played by Roxann Dawson, 1985
Madge Murray
Played by Doris Belack, 1966–1968

== N ==
Melissa Needham
Played by Taro Meyer, 1981–1982
Tom Nelson
Played by Steven Culp, 1982
Ron Nettles
Played by Ted King, 1993
Fairfax Newman
Played by Nick Gregory, 1996
Alexander Nikos
Played by John Aprea, 1997
Dick Nolan
Played by Lou Sutton, 1968
Lieutenant.
Frederick Nolan
Played by Phillip Clark, 1998
Doctor.
Max Nolan
Played by Andy Davoli, 1996–1999
Peggy Nolan
Played by Micki Grant, 1965–1972
Jenna Norris
Played by Alla Korot, 1990–1993

== O ==
Anne O'Donnell
Played by Alice Barrett, 1999
Dave O'Horgan
Played by Dan Desmond, 1982
Ian O'Leary
Played by Jim Cronin, 1996–1997
Police officer.
Rocky Olsen
Played by John Braden, 1975–1977
Bert Ordway
Played by Roberts Blossom, 1976–1978
Jane Overstreet
Played by Frances Sternhagen, 1971

== P ==
Ken Palmer
Played by Will Lyman, 1976–1977
Angie Perrini
Played by Toni Kalem, 1975–1977; Maeve Kinkead, 1977–1980
Joey Perrini
Played by Ray Liotta, 1978–1981
Rose Perrini
Played by Kathleen Widdoes, 1978–1980
Deke Peters
Played by Sean O'Connor, 1982
Brittany Peterson
Played by Sharon Gabet, 1985–1987
Ben Petroni
Played by Kelly Fitzpatrick, 1980–1981
Stuart Philbin
Played by Charles Siebert, 1971
Doctor.
Byron Pierce
Played by Mitch Longley, 1991–1992
Frank Prescott
Played by Mason Adams, 1976–1977
Doctor.

== R ==
Sergei Radzinsky
Played by Jonathan Sharp, 1999
Ian Rain
Played by Julian McMahon, 1993–1995
John Randolph
Played by Michael M. Ryan, 1964–1979
Lee Randolph
Played by Gaye Huston, 1964–1967; Barbara Rodell, 1967–1969
Marianne Randolph
Played by Jeanne Beirne, 1970; Lora McDonald, 1971; Tracey Brown, 1971; Christopher Corwin, 1971; Loriann Ruger, 1972–1973; Tiberia Mitri, 1974–1975; Ariana Chase, 1975–1976; Ariane Muenker 1976–1977; Adrienne Wallace, 1977–1979; Beth Collins, 1980–1982
Michael Randolph
Played by Dennis Sullivan, 1970; John Sullivan, 1971; Christopher Corwin, 1971; Tim Nissen, 1972; Tom Ruger, 1972–1973; Tom Sabota Jr., 1974; Glen Zachar, 1974; Christopher J. Brown, 1974–1975; Lionel Johnston, 1975–1979
Olive Randolph
Played by Jennifer Leak, 1976–1979
Pat Matthews Randolph
Played by Susan Trustman, 1964–1967; Beverly Penberthy, 1967–1982, 1989
Kathryn Reeve
Played by Elaine Princi, 1997
Judge.
Rod Reynolds
Played by Geoffrey Horne, 1983
Tomas Rivera
Played by Diego Serrano, 1994–1997
Lila Roberts
Played by Lisa Peluso, 1997–1999
Shane Roberts
Played by Robert Kelker-Kelly, 1996–1998
Victor Rodriguez
Played by Carlos Sanz, 1993–1994
Chad Rollo
Played by Richard Burgi, 1986–1988
Dawn Rollo
Played by Barbara Tyson, 1987–1988
Alma Rudder
Played by Elizabeth Franz, 1982–1983

== S ==
Ed Sadowski
Played by Steven Ryan, 1981
Pilara Sanchez
Played by Marie Barrientos, 1988–1989
Harry Shea
Played by Edward Power, 1981–1982
Pete Shea
Played by Christopher Marcantel, 1981–1982
Dan Shearer
Played by John Cunningham, 1970–1971; Brian Murray, 1978–1979
Julia Shearer
Played by Kyra Sedgwick, 1982–1983; Jonna Lee, 1983; Faith Ford, 1983–1984
Susan Shearer
Played by Fran Sharon, 1964; Lynn Milgrim, 1978–1979, 1982
Eileen Simpson
Played by Vicky Dawson, 1977–1979
Amanda Sinclair
Played by Nicole Catalanotto, 1978–81; Dana Klaboe, 1981–86; Sandra Ferguson, 1987–1993, 1998–1999; Christine Tucci, 1993–1995; Laura Moss, 1996–1998
Cameron Sinclair
Played by Michael Rodrick, 1998–1999
Gary Sinclair
Played by Timothy Gibbs, 1995–1998; John Littlefield, 1998–1999
Josie Sinclair
Played by Alexandra Wilson, 1988–1991; Amy Carlson, 1993–1998; Nadine Stenovitch, 1998–1999
Mark Singleton
Played by Robin Thomas, 1983–1985
Louis St. George
Played by Jack Betts, 1982–1983
Caroline Stafford
Played by Joy Bell, 1988–1991
Jordan Stark
Played by David Andrew Macdonald, 1999
Rich Stevens
Played by himself, 1987–1989
Harriet Sullivan
Played by Jane Alice Brandon, 1972
Registered Nurse.

== T ==
Cliff Tanner
Played by Tom Rolfing, 1977–1978
Joanne Taylor
Played by Melissa Dye, 1997
David Thatcher
Played by Lewis Arlt, 1983–1984
Kevin Thatcher
Played by Trevor Richard, 1983–1986
Michael Thayer
Played by Gary Sandy, 1969
Charles Thompson
Played by Eriq La Salle, 1987
David Thornton
Played by Konrad Matthaei, 1969; Joseph Ponazecki, 1971
Doctor.
Carter Todd
Played by Russell Curry, 1984–1986
Grant Todd
Played by John Dewey Carter, 1984–1985
Glenda Toland
Played by Maia Danziger, 1974–1975
Lily Tran
Played by Alexandra Bokyun Chun, 1992
Beverly Tucker
Played by Christine Baranski, 1983
Hannah Tuttle
Played by Helen Gallagher, 1989
Oliver Twist
Played by Dick Cavett, 1988
Hypnotist.

== V ==
Buffy Van Buren
Played by Gloria Hoye, 1982
Lahoma Van Lucas
Played by Ann Wedgeworth, 1967–1970
Alison Van Rohan
Played by Marin Hinkle, 1995
Mike Venable
Played by Andrew Jarkowsky, 1972–1973

== W ==
Dick Wagner
Played by J.J. Johnston, 1982
Courtney Walker
Played by Valarie Pettiford, 1988–1990
Detective.
Wallingford
Played by Brent Collins, 1984–1988
Louis Washburn
Played by Hansford Rowe, 1981
Maisie Watkins
Played by Patricia Hodges, 1982–1987
Barbara Weaver
Played by Roberta Maxwell, 1975; Kathryn Walker, 1976
Evan Webster
Played by Barry Jenner, 1976–1977
Dennis Wheeler
Played by Mike Hammett, 1972–1978; Jim Poyner, 1978–1980; Chris Bruno, 1991–1993
Iris Wheeler
Played by Beverlee McKinsey, 1972–1980; Carole Shelley, 1980; Carmen Duncan, 1988–1994
Dean Whitney
Played by Christopher Noth, 1988
Cass Winthrop
Played by Stephen Schnetzer, 1982–1986, 1987–1999
Charlie Winthrop
Played by Lindsay Fabes, 1994–1995; Kellyann Murphy, 1997
Morgan Winthrop
Played by Grayson McCouch, 1993–1996
Stacey Winthrop
Played by Terry Davis, 1982–1984; Hilary Edson, 1989–1991
Rain Wolfe
Played by Sarah Hyland, 1997–1998
Kathy Wolikowski
Played by Priscilla Garita, 1993
Lisa Woo
Played by Linda Wang, 1998–1999
Remy Woods
Played by Taylor Stanley, 1998–1999
Chris Wylie
Played by Tracy Brooks Swope, 1982

== Z ==
Cal Zimmerman
Played by Jason Ingram, 1977–1978

== Who's Who in Another World references link ==
- Who's Who in Bay City on Another World at soapcentral.com
