= Christian Camargo =

American actor

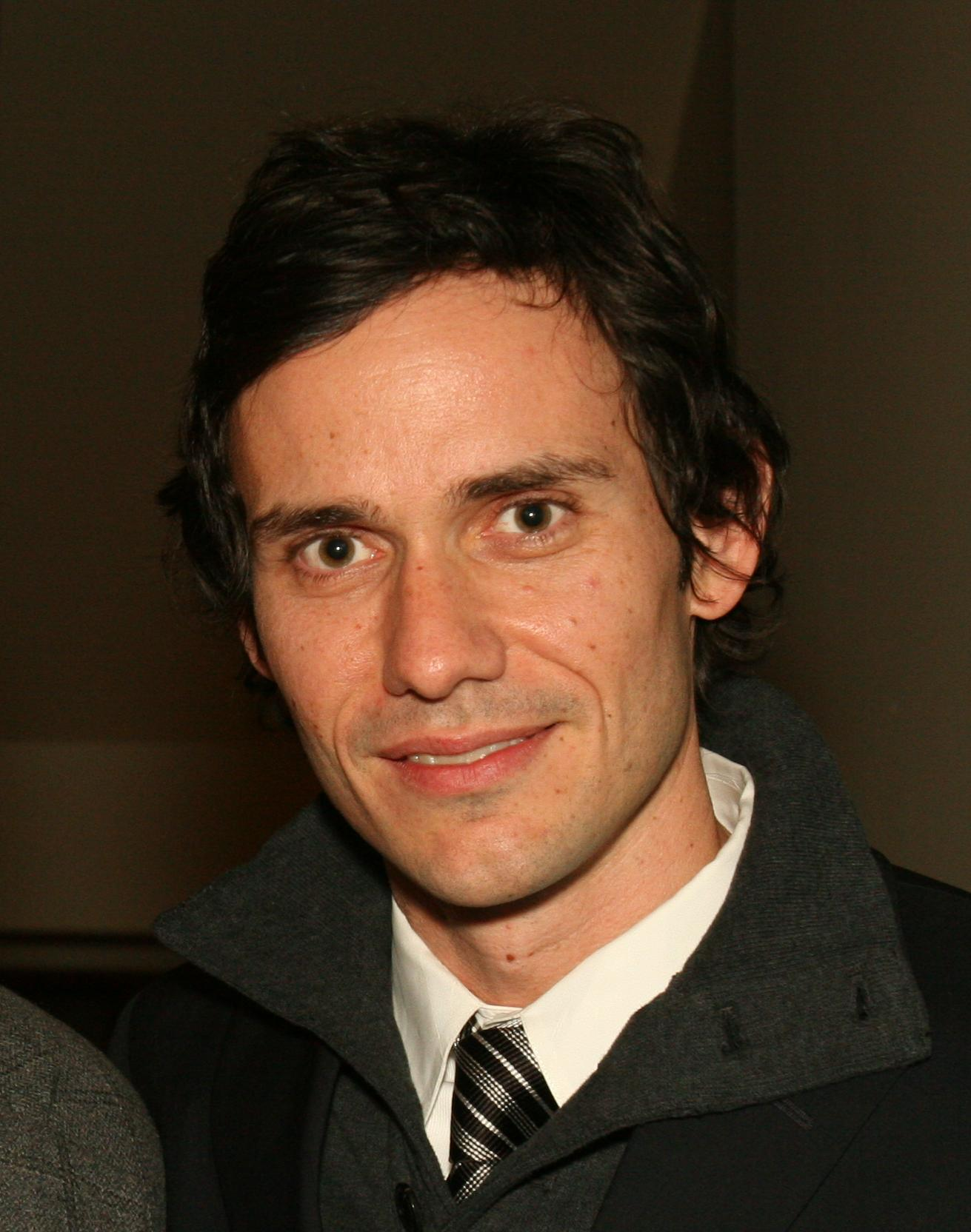
- Camargo in 2008
- Born: Christian Minnick; July 7, 1971 (age 55); New York City, U.S
- Education: Hobart College (BA); Juilliard School (GrDip)
- Occupations: Actor and director
- Years active: 1996–present
- Notable work: Dexter; Penny Dreadful; The Hurt Locker; See
- Spouse: Juliet Rylance (m. 2008; div. 2016)
- Partner: Sylvia van der Klooster (2019–present)
- Children: 1
- Mother: Victoria Wyndham
- Relatives: Ralph Camargo (grandfather)

Christian Camargo (né Minnick; born July 7, 1971) is an American actor, director, producer, and writer. He is best known for his role as Brian Moser in the Showtime drama Dexter and army officer John Cambridge in the Academy Award-winning film The Hurt Locker. Camargo's other roles include Michael Corrigan in the Netflix drama House of Cards, Count Dracula in the third season of Penny Dreadful, Eleazar in the films The Twilight Saga: Breaking Dawn – Parts 1 and 2, and Tamacti Jun in See.

Camargo is also a stage actor who has starred in plays and musicals such as including Romeo & Juliet and Coriolanus. His theatre work has earned him critical acclaim, including an Obie Award. He has directed the films Days and Nights (2013) and The Last Manhunt (2022).

== Early life ==
Camargo's birth name is Christian Minnick. He is the son of actress Victoria Wyndham and investment broker Wendell Minnick. His brother is photographer Darian Minnick and his aunt is Broadway actress Felice Camargo. He grew up on a small horse farm in Katonah, New York, and learned early auto restoration, where he earned his enthusiasm for vehicles. His first car was a 1979 Cadillac Fleetwood Brougham.

Camargo attended the Harvey School and graduated from the upper school in 1989, which is where he discovered his passion for theatre.

He is of Mexican descent through his maternal grandfather, actor Ralph Camargo. He is a 1992 graduate of Hobart College. He was the program director of WEOS, the college's public radio station.

Camargo is a graduate of the Juilliard School, where he was a member of the Drama Division's Group 25 (1992–96). He went on to perform in the 1996 Broadway production of David Hare's Skylight with Michael Gambon (Theater World Award). From there, Camargo went to England to join the inaugural company of Shakespeare's Globe Theatre on the Southbank, where he met his future wife, English actress Juliet Rylance, in 1997.

=== Name change ===
Camargo's grandfather, Ralph Camargo, was a Mexican-American actor who talked his daughters into changing their names to something Anglicized because he felt he had lost roles due to being Latino. Christian decided to change his name from his father's family name of Minnick to his maternal grandfather's surname of Camargo because of pride in his Mexican-American heritage and a desire to bring back a name that he felt was connected to his profession. Christian cited Ralph as an important figure in his life, saying "My parents had a difficult divorce. My dad had to take a backseat for a few years, and my grandfather came in. He was also my inspiration for becoming an actor. I really respected him."

== Career ==
Camargo made his theatrical debut in 1999, starring in films such as Plunkett & Macleane and Harlem Aria, co-starring in the latter with Damon Wayans and Gabriel Casseus. He continued playing small roles in films, starring as Officer Pavel Loktev in K-19: The Widowmaker (2002) and playing Detective Scott in The Cry (2007).

Camargo is perhaps best known for his role as Brian Moser, a.k.a. Rudy Cooper, the long-lost brother of the titular character, in Dexter, starring as a regular cast member in Season 1 (2006). Brian is the enigmatic Ice Truck Killer, his main goal being to reunite with his brother by starting a series of murders to attract Dexter's attention while getting closer to him by dating his foster sister, Debra Morgan, under his "Rudy Cooper" alias. Originally, Jeremy Renner was considered for the role but declined due to scheduling conflicts. Camargo reprised the role as a guest star in Season 2 (2007), Season 6 (2011), and in the sequel series Dexter: Resurrection (2025). Brian Moser's character received critical acclaim and is considered to be one of Dexter's best villains, with Camargo's performance in particular being praised. Camargo continues to receive mementos from fans, including prosthetic hands with colored fingernails.

Camargo's New York theater work includes the Public Theater's Kit Marlowe, Steve Martin's Underpants at Classic Stage Company, and the title role of Theater For A New Audience's Coriolanus. He made his broadway debut in 1996 as Edward Sergeant in Skylight, which coincidentally had Camargo's Dexter co-star Michael C. Hall as his understudy. In 2008, Camargo played opposite Dianne Wiest, John Lithgow and Katie Holmes in Arthur Miller's All My Sons on Broadway. In early 2009, he played the title role in the Theatre for a New Audience's production of Hamlet. He won an Obie and Drama League nomination for his performance. The show ran until April 12, 2009.

Camargo portrayed Orlando in The Bridge Project's presentation of Shakespeare's As You Like It in Brooklyn, New York. In February 2010, he played Ariel in the company's rendition of Shakespeare's The Tempest. Both plays were directed by British director Sam Mendes. On September 30, 2010, he was cast as Eleazar Denali in The Twilight Saga: Breaking Dawn, Parts 1 and 2, playing alongside Mía Maestro, who played Eleazar's wife, Carmen.

Camargo wrote and directed Days and Nights, a modern retelling of Anton Chekhov's The Seagull, produced by his wife, actress Juliet Rylance, together with Barbara Romer, founder of the New Globe Theater. The film was scheduled for a 2014 release. He portrayed Mercutio in the 2013 Broadway revival of Romeo and Juliet, directed by David Leveaux and starring Orlando Bloom as Romeo and Condola Rashād as Juliet. He guest starred as antagonist Wade Crocker on the third season of Syfy's Haven and appeared on the third season of Elementary as Chris Santos.

Camargo portrayed the title character of the Theatre for a New Audience off-Broadway production of Pericles, directed by Trevor Nunn, from February to April 2016. In May of that year he guest starred as Dracula on the third season of Showtime's Penny Dreadful. In March and April 2017, Camargo portrayed a mid-career Robert Evans in Simon McBurney's stage adaptation of The Kid Stays in the Picture, staged in London's Royal Court Theatre. In the same year, he also starred in the Netflix miniseries, Wormwood.

He also appeared as brutal military leader Tamacti Jun in the American TV show See (2019-2022). In an interview, Camargo stated his love for playing villains, saying "It is so much fun. It's so much fun to play that. I love playing bad characters. You might know that I have a bit of a penchant for that. I love complicated, dark individuals, but yeah, so that was fun." In 2022, he played Mr. Aunspach in the horror film Student Body. He also played in Witch Hunt as witch hunter Detective Hawthorne.

Camargo directed The Last Manhunt (2022) and also played the character Sheriff Wilson. He originally joined the project as an actor; however, shortly before production began, Jason Momoa, Camargo's See co-star who co-wrote the screenplay and was slated to direct, backed out due to scheduling conflicts. To prevent the film from being canceled, Camargo assumed directing responsibilities in addition to his role as Wilson. Camargo aimed for diversity and representation of Native American communities, stating "I really like making movies that people either love or hate, no in-between. If you like it, if you don't like the movie — doesn't matter. The Native community likes it. They feel heard, and the conversation has sort of corrected a little bit of history. So to me, anything [else] is just gravy."

In 2025, Camargo entered a development deal, partnering with Dimension Studio and Two Chairs Production for Camargo's planned television series, Camelot.

== Personal life ==
In November 2008, Camargo married British actress Juliet Rylance at the New York City Hall. He divorced Juliet after nine years of marriage around 2016–2017. He has a son born in November 2019 with his girlfriend, Sylvia van der Klooster, and has a dog named Garth. Camargo currently resides in Joshua Tree, California.

Camargo is a car enthusiast. When asked what career he would pursue if he wasn't an actor, Camargo said he would do auto restoration. He also founded a vintage car shop and photo studio in 2000 in Williamsburg, Brooklyn called Fast Ashleys. His personal cars include a Chevy pickup, a 1971 Oldsmobile Cutlass drag racer, and a 1989 Toyota Land Cruiser. Camargo was the creator and executive producer of the short-lived MTV reality show, Fast Inc., which promoted Fast Ashleys. He sold off the shop sometime in the 2000s.

In 2014, Camargo was inducted into the hall of fame of his old school, the Harvey School, receiving the Outstanding Alumni Award.

== Filmography ==
=== Film ===
Year	Title	Role	Notes
1999	Plunkett & Macleane	Lord Pelham	
1999	Harlem Aria	Matthew	
1999	Story of a Bad Boy	Noel	
1999	Picture This	Frank Ryan	
2001	Lip Service	Stuart	
2001	Double Bang	Brian Jacobs	
2002	K-19: The Widowmaker	Pavel	
2005	Welcome to California	Jimmy Smith	
2006	Find Love	He	
2007	The Picture of Dorian Gray	Henry Wotton	
2007	The Cry	Detective Scott	
2007	National Treasure: Book of Secrets	John Wilkes Booth	
2008	The Hurt Locker	Colonel John Cambridge	
2008	Henry May Long	Henry May	
2008	Happy Tears	Jackson	
2011	The Twilight Saga: Breaking Dawn – Part 1	Elezar Denali	
2012	The Twilight Saga: Breaking Dawn – Part 2	Elezar Denali	
2013	Europa Report	Daniel Luxembourg	
2013	Days and Nights	Peter	Also writer and director
2013	Romeo and Juliet	Mercutio	
2019	She's Missing	Lyle	
2021	Witch Hunt	Detective Hawthorne	
2022	Student Body	Mr. Aunspach	
2022	The Last Manhunt	Sheriff Wilson	Also director
TBA	Big Mike's Cabin	Maintenance Man	

=== Television ===
Year	Title	Role	Notes
1997	Great Performances		Episode: "Henry V at Shakespeare's Globe"
1998	Guiding Light	Mark Endicott	
2002-2003	Presidio Med	Peter Witowski	Episodes: "Best of Enemies" and "Cascading"
2002	For the People	Paul Babala	Episode: "Nascent"
2003	Boomtown	Bradley Dawson	Episode: "Monster's Brawl"
2003	Without a Trace	Freddy Cattan	Episode: "The Source"
2003	CSI: Crime Scene Investigation	Michael Fife	Episode: "Invisible Evidence"
2004	Karen Sisco	Arvin Worley	Episode: "He Was a Friend of Mine"
2005	Ghost Whisperer	Brad Paulson	Episodes: "Mended Hearts" and "Hope and Mercy"
2006-2007; 2011	Dexter	Brian Moser / Rudy Cooper	10 episodes
2007	Studio 60 on the Sunset Strip	Actor Playing Keith Richards	Episode: "The Harriet Diner"
2008	The Cleaner	Michael Davis	Episode: "To Catch a Fed"
2008	Numb3rs	Dr. Trey Bramon	Episode: "Hydra"
2009	Law & Order	Attorney Wilson	Episode: "Crimebusters"
2011	Medium	Jeremy Haas	Episode: "Labor Pains"
2011	The Mentalist	Henry Tibbs	Episode: "Ring Around the Rosie"
2012	The Good Wife	Aidan Stoddard	Episode: "After the Fall"
2013	Haven	Wade Crocker	6 episodes
2014	Elementary	Chris Santos	Episode: "The Adventure of the Nutmeg Concoction
2015	House of Cards	Michael Corrigan	2 episodes
2016	Penny Dreadful	Dr. Alexander Sweet / Dracula	7 episodes
2017	Wormwood	Dr. Robert Lashbrook	
2017	Manhunt	Joe Birdland	Episode: "Lincoln"
2018	The City and the City	David Bowen	
2019-2022	See	Tamacti Jun	Main role
2023	Conquistadors: The Rise and Fall		Narrator
2025	Dexter: Resurrection	Brian Moser	Episode: "And Justice for All..."
TBA	Camelot		Creator and co-producer
