= Mac Cory =

- Another World character
- Douglass Watson as Mac
- Portrayed by: Robert Emhardt (1973–74); Douglass Watson (1974–89)
- Duration: 1973–89
- First appearance: May 1, 1973
- Last appearance: May 10, 1989
- Created by: Harding Lemay
- Introduced by: Paul Rauch
- Spin-off appearances: Texas
- Crossover appearances: For Richer, For Poorer
In-universe information
- Other names: John Caldwell
- Occupation: CEO of Cory Publishing; Owner of KBAY
- Mother: Alexandra Cory
- Brothers: Alfred Cory
- Spouse: Emily Cory (widowed); Rachel Davis (1975–79, 1980–81, 1983–89); Janice Frame (1979–80)
- Sons: Sandy Cory; Matthew Cory (legal)
- Daughters: Iris Wheeler; Paulina Carlino; Amanda Cory
- Stepsons: Jamie Frame
- Grandsons: Dennis Wheeler; Alex Cory; Dante Carlino
- Granddaughters: Maggie Cory; Alli Fowler; Remy Woods; Jasmine Cory (legal)
- Nephews: Adam Cory; Neal Cory

Mackenzie "Mac" Cory is a fictional character from the daytime soap opera, Another World. Originally portrayed by Robert Emhardt from 1973 to 1974, Douglass Watson portrayed the role from 1974 until 1989.

Mac was one of the Another World's most popular characters, and his pairing with Rachel Davis, portrayed by Victoria Wyndham, was one of the show's most beloved couples. After Watson died unexpectedly in May 1989, his death was written into the show with Mac dying off-screen of a heart attack.

== Casting ==
Watson made his first appearance as Mac on August 7, 1974.

== Character history ==
=== Backstory ===
Mackenzie Cory was born and raised in Fall River, Massachusetts. After studying at Dartmouth, he served in World War II. Mac then obtained an MA in journalism from Northwestern University.

He married his first wife, Emily, in the 1930s. While married to Emily, Mac had an affair with Sylvie Kosloff, who, unbeknownst to him, became pregnant. When Sylvie was sent to prison, she asked Emily to adopt her baby. Emily took the baby home and named her Iris. Emily and Mac decided to raise Iris to believe she was Mac and Emily's biological daughter. Ironically, Mac was completely unaware that Iris was in fact his biological daughter.

Mac became a multi-millionaire by building his company, Cory Publishing, into one of the country's biggest publishing houses.

=== Family ===
Mac had six children. He had one biological son, Alexander "Sandy" Cory, and three biological daughters, Iris Wheeler, Amanda Sinclair, and Paulina Carlino. Mac also raised Rachel's son Matthew as his own, and had a close relationship with Rachel's other son, Jamie Frame.

Sandy was the product of a fling that Mac had with a woman named Miriam Sanderson. Mac was completely unaware of Sandy's existence until he came to Bay City. Amanda was the only biological child Mac and Rachel shared. Mac never met Paulina, who came to Bay City after his death. Mac had an affair with Paulina's mother, Maria Hernandez DeSilva, 30 years prior when he was a reporter covering the revolution in San Cristobal. Mac was forced to return to the United States, but he had planned to bring Maria over eventually. Those plans were canceled when Mac learned Maria died. Mac never knew that Maria had given birth to his child.

Despite not being Matthew's biological father (Matthew was the product of one-night-stand between Rachel and Mitch Blake), Mac loved Matthew as his own from the time he was born. Even after Matthew found out the truth about his parentage, the two remained close until Mac's death, with Matthew considering Mac his father in every way that mattered. Mac also always considered Jamie to be his son as well, and the two of them were also very close.

=== Life in Bay City ===
Mac Cory first arrived in Bay City in 1973 to support Iris, whose son, Dennis, was ill. He decided to permanently settle down in Bay City and set up an office of Cory Publishing there. Iris threw a party in honor of her "Daddy", which Rachel Frame ended up crashing. Iris was having her thrown out when Mac came to Rachel's rescue. Mac sent her flowers the next day, and their romance began. Mac also formed a close bond with Rachel's son, Jamie, while Iris fumed over the relationship. During her relationship with Mac, Rachel began to find new depths in herself now that she had unconditional love and support. On Valentine's Day 1975, Rachel and Mac married at his townhouse in New York City. As a wedding present, Mac bought Rachel the mansion by the bay she used to walk by as a child and dream about living in. They were never happy for long, though, mostly due to Iris interfering every chance she could.

Among Iris' many schemes was the hiring of a man to give Rachel horse-riding lessons, hoping the man would try to seduce her. When that didn't work, Iris hired someone at the mansion to cause trouble for Mac and Rachel. A wedge was being driven between Mac and Rachel, but things looked brighter when Rachel became pregnant. In one of her most despicable acts, when Rachel called Iris looking for Mac when she was in terrible pain, Iris just hung up the phone and never told her Daddy. Rachel sadly ended up miscarrying the baby. Mac and Rachel then began to drift apart. He spent his time focusing on moving his company completely to Bay City, while she focused on her art. Over the next decade, Mac and Rachel would divorce twice. However, after each divorce, they would eventually rekindle their romance and then get married again. They also had a child of their own together, a daughter named Amanda. Mac also was a surrogate father to Rachel's sons Jamie (with Steve Frame) and Matthew (with Mitch Blake). They both also had other lovers and spouses along the way (Janice Frame, Mitch Blake, Alice Frame, and Steve Frame, among others). Having already remarried for the third and final time in 1983, Mac and Rachel renewed their wedding vows in 1986. The two spent the next few years together, committed and in love with each other.

In 1988, Mac learned that Iris, who had returned to Bay City after an eight year absence, was in fact his biological daughter. Prior to Iris' return, a mysterious publishing house called Bennett Publishing had nearly brought Cory Publishing to the brink of destruction. In addition, Mac found himself charged and arrested for the murder of Bennett Publishing's one agent, but charges were subsequently dropped. The only thing that was known about Bennett Publishing was that it was run by someone called "The Chief." Rachel teamed up with Donna Hudson and Cass Winthrop to investigate, and found out "The Chief" was none other than Iris herself. Rachel confronted Iris about it, demanding that Iris tell Mac. Mac was devastated by the revelation that Iris was responsible for both the hostile takeover attempt of his company and for having him temporarily framed for murder. Mac disowned Iris and went to Maine to reflect on recent events. Mac died there shortly after of a heart attack, without having reconciled with Iris, much to Iris's devastation.

Rachel was devastated by Mac's death, and tearfully buried the love of her life. He was her anchor, her lover, and her best friend. Although she eventually fell in love again and remarried years later, a part of her heart would always belong to Mac.
