= Any Number Can Die =

Play

- Written by: Fred Carmichael
- Characters: 12: 7 Male, 5 Female
- Original language: English or Acting language
- Setting: 1928

Premiere
- Place premiered: United States

Any Number Can Die premiered at the Dorset Playhouse, Dorset, Vermont by the Caravan Theatre Summer Stock Company. The Dorset Playhouse was owned by Fred and his wife Patricia from 1949-1975.

== Plot ==
The play takes place in Raven's Head, an old mansion on a deserted island off the coast of North Carolina. A spoof of murder mysteries and classic movies from the 1920s and 30s, the plot follows the regular stereotypes of classical murder mysteries, such as the reading of a will at midnight, enigmatic and curious-looking house staff, secret passageways, and an old detective working on his first-ever case.

== Scene Breakdown ==
- Act I
  - Scene One:Late afternoon
  - Scene Two:After dinner
- Act II
  - Scene One:Short time later
  - Scene Two:An hour later
- Act III
  - Scene One:Short time later
  - Scene Two:An hour later, just before dawn.

== Cast ==
The show was directed by Fred Carmichael, staged by Patricia Carmichael, set design by Judith Page Murray, and lighting design by George Blanchard. It starred Nicholas (Chuck), Colette Bablon (Judy), Susan Kaslow (Zenia), Charles Dickens (Roger Masters), Victoria Camargo (Celia Lathrop), M. Emmet Walsh (T.J. Lathrop), Peter von Mayrhauser (Edgars), Elizabeth Franz (Ernestine Wintergreen), Barbara Greacen (Sally VanViller), Anthony Dingman (Carter Forstman), Nick Masi Jr. (Jack Regent), and Fred Carmichael (Hannibal Hix).
