= The Academy @ Shawnee =

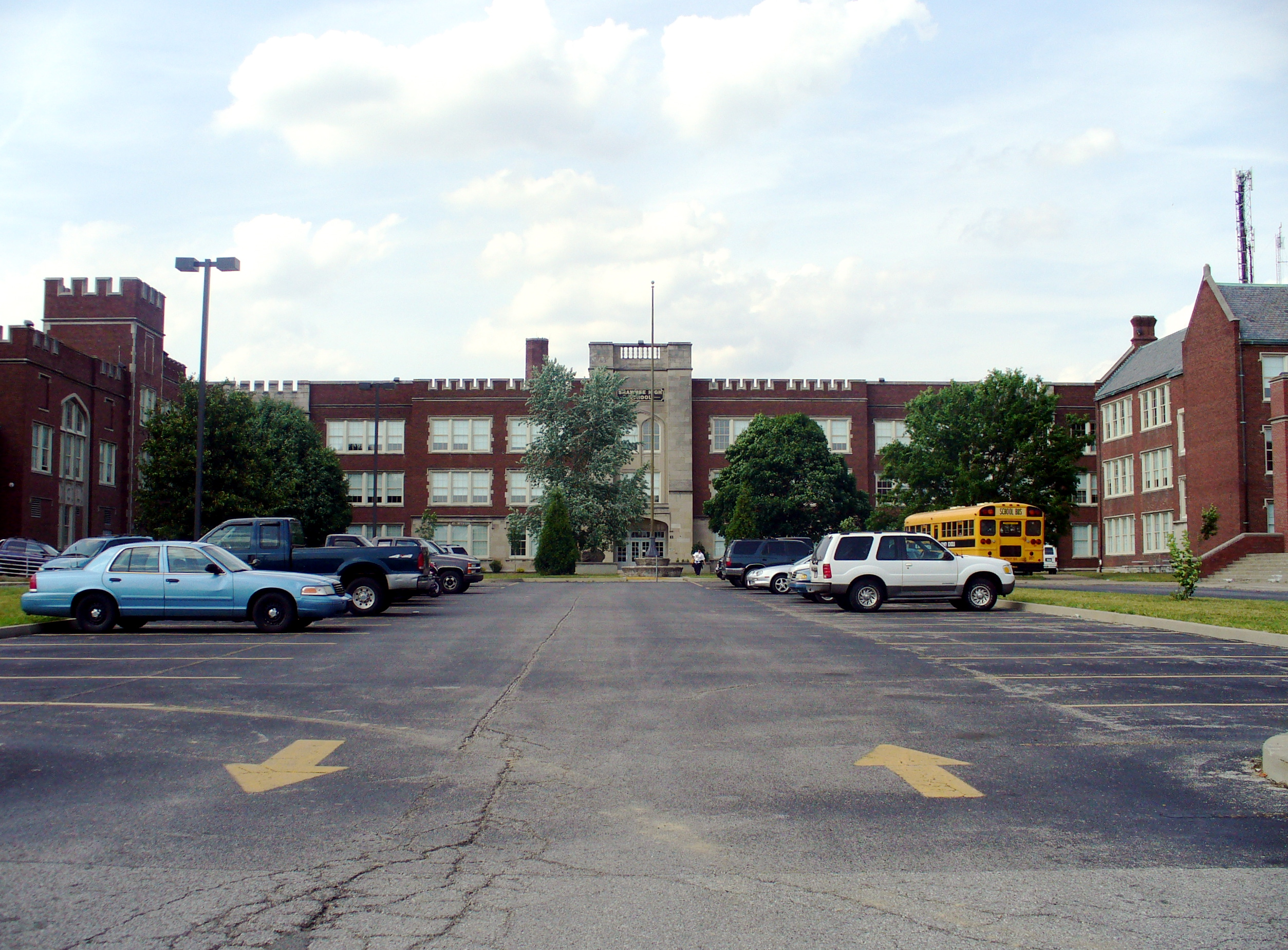
- Entrance outside the main office

Location
- 4001 Herman St. Louisville, Kentucky 40212; United States; 38.26090°N 85.81500°W

Information
- Type: Public
- Established: 1927
- School district: Jefferson County Public Schools
- Faculty: 58 (FTE)
- Grades: PK, 6–12
- Enrollment: 972 (2023–2024)
- Student to teacher ratio: 16.76
- Colors: Navy and Gold
- Nickname: Golden Eagles
- Information: Magnet Program School
- Website: https://www.jefferson.kyschools.us/o/shawnee

The Academy @ Shawnee (formerly, Shawnee High School Magnet Career Academy [MCA]), is a magnet middle school and high school (grades 6–12) in the Jefferson County Public School District in Louisville, Kentucky. It is one of five West Louisville schools selected as part of the Signature Partnership initiative with the University of Louisville. The Academy@ Shawnee also houses the Challenger Learning Center.

The Academy @Shawnee began as a high school and incorporated a middle school in the fall of 2013. The school building sits on a large campus and is Gothic-inspired in its architectural design; it was constructed in 1927 and is on the National Register of Historic Places (reference number 84000277). The school had a listed enrollment of 593 students for the 2014/15 school year.

== Notable alumni ==
- Ed Hamilton - World-renowned Sculptor, Class of 1965
- Rudy Macklin - Professional Basketball Player, Class of 1976
- Gerald Neal - Kentucky State Senator, Class of 1963
- Tom Payne - Professional Basketball Player, Class of 1969
- Martha Rofheart - American Stage Actress & Historical Novelist, Class of 1933

== See also ==
- Public schools in Louisville, Kentucky
