= Ralph Camargo =

American actor

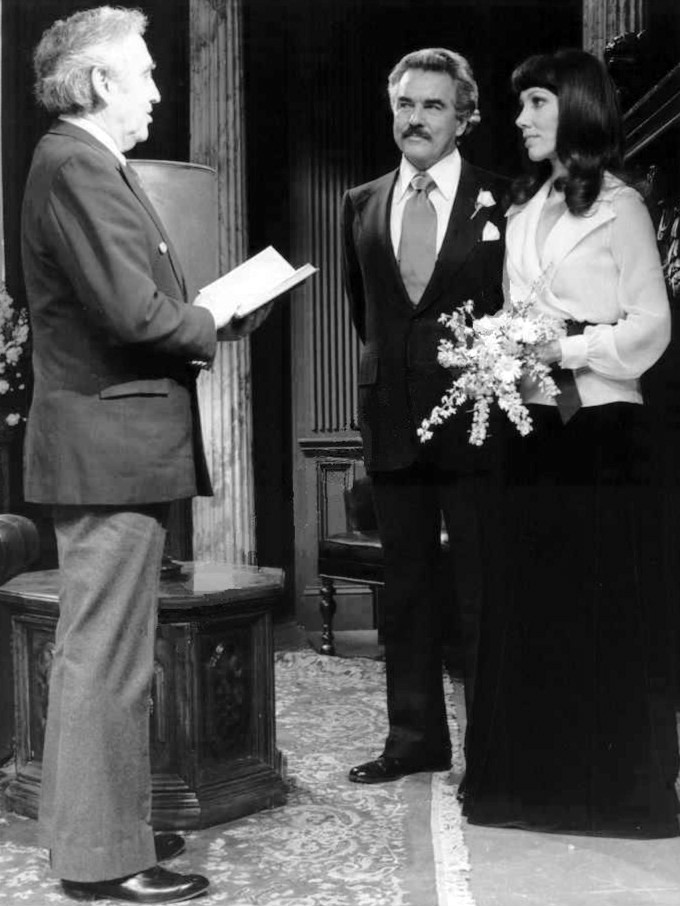
- Camargo as the justice of the peace on Another World, 1975. The scene includes his daughter, Victoria, and was the first time the two had acted together.
- Born: Rafael Jaime Camargo; February 27, 1912
- Died: January 15, 1992 (aged 79)
- Occupations: Stage, film, television actor
- Spouse: Florence Skeels
- Children: 2, including Victoria Wyndham
- Relatives: Christian Camargo (grandson)

Ralph Jaime Camargo (February 27, 1912 – January 15, 1992) was an American actor, best known for his work in theater. He was also well known for being "the voice of Dynamic," narrating many short films in the 1950s and 1960s for the Firestone Tire and Rubber Company.

Camargo was an actor in the soap opera Guiding Light in the era of old-time radio. He acted on the television version of that program and on The Edge of Night, Playhouse 90, The United States Steel Hour and other TV programs.

Camargo's Latino ethnicity limited his opportunities in acting. His grandson said, "He had to hide behind radio because they typecast him as an evil person or 'the Indian.'"

In the 1930s Camargo "was prominently identified" with stage productions on the West Coast. His theatrical work included directing Hay Fever for the Lakewood Players in Tacoma, Washington, in 1939.

== Personal life ==
Camargo was a member of The Players social club for actors in New York.

He was married to actress Florence Skeels. Their daughters are actresses Victoria Wyndham and Felice Camargo. His grandson is film and television actor Christian Camargo.
