= Days and Nights =

- Theatrical release poster
- Directed by: Christian Camargo
- Written by: Christian Camargo
- Produced by: Barbara Romer; Juliet Rylance
- Starring: Katie Holmes; William Hurt; Allison Janney; Cherry Jones; Michael Nyqvist; Jean Reno; Russell Means; Juliet Rylance; Mark Rylance; Ben Whishaw
- Cinematography: Steve Cosens
- Edited by: Ron Dulin; Sarah Flack
- Music by: Claire van Kampen
- Production company: Art Cine
- Distributed by: IFC Films
- Release date: November 8, 2013 (Denver Film Festival)
- Running time: 91 minutes
- Country: United States
- Language: English
- Box office: $13,243

Days and Nights is a 2013 American drama film directed and written by Christian Camargo. The film is inspired by The Seagull by Anton Chekhov and set in rural New England in the 1980s.

== Cast ==
- Allison Janney - Elizabeth - Movie star
- William Hurt - Herb - Dying brother of Elizabeth
- Ben Whishaw - Eric - Artist - Son of Elizabeth
- Katie Holmes - Alex - Daughter of Mary and Johan
- Mark Rylance - Stephen - Ornithologist - Husband of Alex
- Juliet Rylance - Eva - Eric's muse
- Christian Camargo - Peter - Friend of Elizabeth
- Jean Reno - Louis - Family doctor
- Michael Nyqvist - Johan - Caretaker
- Russell Means - Big Jim
- Cherry Jones - Mary - Wife of Johan

== Reception ==
As of June 2020, Days and Nights 0% approval rating on Rotten Tomatoes, based on 13 reviews with an average rating of 4.11/10.

Ken Rudolph recognized that the actors were splendid, but the film seemed trite, and pretentious. The film critic Thorsten Krüger considers that Camargo "has nothing to tell and nothing to say." The film "intends to be profound, but offers too little to be interesting".

"The cast, so packed with talent that Jean Reno and Cherry Jones barely register, is stuck with stagey dialogue. Juliet Rylance, in the Nina part, has a particularly hard time."

The World Cinema Now Program reviewed the film as: "Anton Chekhov’s The Seagull has seen numerous iterations over the decades, but actor/director Christian Camargo (The Hurt Locker) is able to honor the darkness and depth of this Russian tragedy while relocating it to a Memorial Day weekend in rural New England and putting his own contemporary spin on the material. With a haunting score, lovely cinematography, and strong performances from a remarkable ensemble cast, we see a family come together then fracture apart over the course of one disastrous weekend."

The New York Times commented that "'The Seagull,' with its depiction of fin de siècle ennui, has been hollowed out and trivialized. So little time is given to the subsidiary characters in 'Days and Nights' that, at times, the movie barely makes sense. The avian symbol has been changed from a sea gull to a bald eagle. What remains is a cracked shell."

Metacritic, which uses a weighted average, assigned the film a score of 36 out of 100, based on 6 critics, indicating "generally unfavorable" reviews.
