= The Last Manhunt =

2022 film directed by Christian Camargo

- Directed by: Christian Camargo
- Screenplay by: Thomas Pa’a Sibbet
- Story by: Jason Momoa; Thomas Pa’a Sibbet
- Produced by: Jason Eric Laciste; Martin Kistler
- Starring: Martin Sensmeier; Mainei Kinimaka; Zahn McClarnon; Lily Gladstone; Raoul Max Trujillo; Christian Camargo; Amy Seimetz; Tantoo Cardinal; Jason Momoa
- Cinematography: J.P. Alvarez
- Edited by: Jason Dopko
- Music by: Justin Small; Ohad Benchetrit
- Production company: On The Roam
- Distributed by: Saban Films
- Release date: May 27, 2022 (Pioneertown)
- Running time: 103 minutes
- Country: United States
- Language: English

The Last Manhunt is an American Western film, released in 2022. It is directed by Christian Camargo and written by Thomas Pa'a Sibbett from a story by Sibbett and Jason Momoa. Momoa is also an executive producer. The film stars Martin Sensmeier as Willie, alongside an ensemble cast including Momoa, Camargo, Mainei Kinimaka, Lily Gladstone, Zahn McClarnon, and Raoul Max Trujillo. In May 2022, it opened the Pioneertown International Film Festival.

Worldwide rights to the film were picked up by Saban Films in June 2022. Other films have told the Paiute legend, including Tell Them Willie Boy Is Here, starring Robert Redford.

== Plot ==
The film follows a Paiute man named Willie, who treks across the desert after the accidental death of Carlota's father. Blame is placed on the young couple and they are pursued by a group of indigenous people looking for justice.

After some time running from the posse led by Sheriff Wilson, Carlota is bitten by a snake and becomes ill. Willie Boy runs off to Clara to get medicine for Carlota, who is left at Ruby Mountain. The indigenous members of the posse want to kill Willie Boy for murdering Carlota's father, but Sheriff Wilson reiterates that he wants to bring Willie in alive, and threatens to "put them down" if they don't comply. After spotting Carlota from a distance, an indigenous member of the posse shoots and kills her, mistaking Carlota for Willie.

Carlota's body is brought back to Banning, California; while the rest of the posse continue on the hunt for Willie. Willie draws them into a desert enclosure surrounded by steep cliffs, where he opens fire on the posse from above. He only aims for their horses, with no intent to kill any of the men. He escapes to the side of the mountain, where Sheriff Wilson shouts out to Willie that Carlota is dead, and her body has been returned to Banning.

After hearing this, Willie contemplates suicide, holding his rifle under his chin. However, he does not kill himself, and continues his escape. The posse decide to stage Willie's death for the newspaper, with Big Jim lying on the floor as the "dead" Willie Boy, with the posse standing over him. It is revealed in the end (according to oral records from the Chemehuevi tribe) that Willie survived the events of 1909, and lived in isolation near Pahrump, Nevada. He eventually died from Tuberculosis. It also states that Willie Boy and Carlota survived approximately 26 days and 600 miles together on foot, becoming the longest and last great manhunt of the wild west. Newspapers from the time claimed that Willie Boy had shot Carlota himself, and not the posse. This has since been disproven.

== Cast ==
- Martin Sensmeier as Willie Boy
- Mainei Kinimaka as Carlotta
- Zahn McClarnon as William Johnson
- Lily Gladstone as Marie
- Raoul Max Trujillo as Hyde
- Brandon Oakes as Segundo
- Christian Camargo as Sheriff Wilson
- Wade Williams as Reche
- Jamie Sives as Ben
- Justin Campbell as Toutain
- Mojean Aria as Randolph
- Amy Seimetz as Clara True
- Charlie Brumbly as Knowlin
- Skyler Anselmo as Villager
- Tantoo Cardinal as Teacup
- Tim Delano as Ben #2
- Jason Momoa as Big Jim
