= 5th Daytime Emmy Awards =

- Date: June 7, 1978
- Location: New York Hilton
- Presented by: National Academy of Television Arts and Sciences
- Hosted by: Richard Dawson

Highlights
- Outstanding Drama Series: Days of Our Lives
- Outstanding Game Show: Hollywood Squares

Television/radio coverage
- Network: ABC

The 5th Daytime Emmy Awards were held on Wednesday, June 7, 1978, on ABC, to commemorate excellence in American daytime programming from the previous year (1977). The awards were hosted by Family Feud host Richard Dawson, who also won an award for best game show host. Airing from 3 to 4:30 p.m. EST, the telecast preempted General Hospital and The Edge of Night.

Winners in each category are in bold.

== Outstanding Daytime Drama Series ==
- All My Children
- **Days of Our Lives**
- Ryan's Hope
- The Young and the Restless

== Outstanding Actor in a Daytime Drama Series ==
- Matthew Cowles (Billy Clyde Tuggle, All My Children)
- Lawrence Keith (Nick Davis, All My Children)
- **James Pritchett** (**Dr. Matt Powers**, **The Doctors**)
- Michael Storm (Dr. Larry Wolek, One Life to Live)
- Michael Levin (Jack Fenelli, Ryan's Hope)
- Andrew Robinson (Frank Ryan, Ryan's Hope)

== Outstanding Actress in a Daytime Drama Series ==
- Mary Fickett (Ruth Martin, All My Children)
- Susan Lucci (Erica Kane, All My Children)
- **Laurie Heineman** (**Sharlene Frame**, **Another World**)
- Beverlee McKinsey (Iris Carrington, Another World)
- Victoria Wyndham (Rachel Davis, Another World)
- Susan Seaforth Hayes (Julie Olson, Days of our Lives)
- Jennifer Harmon (Cathy Craig, One Life to Live)

== Outstanding Daytime Drama Series Writing ==
- Guiding Light
- Days of our Lives
- All My Children
- **Ryan's Hope**

== Outstanding Daytime Drama Series Directing ==
- Another World
- Days of our Lives
- Ryan's Hope
- As the World Turns
- Love of Life
- **The Young and the Restless**

== Outstanding Game or Audience Participation Show ==
- **The Hollywood Squares** - A Heatter-Quigley Production for NBC
- Family Feud - A Mark Goodson-Bill Todman Production for ABC
- The $20,000 Pyramid - A Bob Stewart Production for ABC

== Outstanding Host or Hostess in a Game or Audience Participation Show ==
- **Richard Dawson** (Family Feud)
- Dick Clark (The $20,000 Pyramid)
- Peter Marshall (The Hollywood Squares)
- Chuck Woolery (Wheel of Fortune)
- Susan Stafford (Wheel of Fortune)

== Outstanding Host or Hostess in a Talk, Service or Variety Series ==
- **Phil Donahue** (**Donahue**)
- Dinah Shore (Dinah!)
