= The Cry (2007 film) =

- Directed by: Bernadine Santistevan
- Written by: Bernadine Santistevan; Monique Salazar
- Produced by: Lara Blum; Juan Dapena; Javier Ramirez Sandoval; Bernadine Santistevan
- Starring: Adriana Domínguez; Christian Camargo; Carlos Leon; Míriam Colón
- Cinematography: Richard Lopez
- Edited by: Dario Bigi; Doug Forbes
- Music by: Dean Parker
- Distributed by: Monterey Media
- Release date: October 30, 2007 (Ravenna Nightmare Film Festival)
- Running time: 83 minutes
- Country: United States
- Language: English
- Box office: $21,427

The Cry (also called La Llorona, which translates to "The Crying Woman") is a 2007 American independent horror film directed by Bernadine Santistevan and co-written with Monique Salazar.

== Plot ==
With help from his partner Sergio Perez (Carlos Leon), New York detective Alex Scott (Christian Camargo) is investigating the mysterious disappearance of several missing children. They interview Gloria the Curandera (Míriam Colón) who advises that an evil force is pursuing the reincarnation of her son and is drowning missing children to bring pain to their parents.

== Cast ==
- Adriana Domínguez as Maria
- Christian Camargo as Alex Scott
- Carlos Leon as Sergio Perez
- Míriam Colón as Gloria the Curandera
- Kate Blumberg as Judy Hardwich
- Jayden Vargas as Tonio
- Quinn McCann as Ryan Weit
- Jane Petrov as Lynn Weit
- Ron Dailey as Man with Stroller
- Lisa G. as Reporter Diane Penn
- Izzy Ruiz as Detective Vega
- Kristin Taylor as Detective Taylor
- Caroline Cole as Assistant D.A. Tanin

== Background ==
The story is based upon the Mexican urban legend of La Llorona. The legend began in Aztec mythos where the goddess Cihuacoatl was said to have taken the form of a beautiful lady draped in white garments to predict the death of her children. This early myth evolved into the modern Mexico version of La Llorona, a woman who, betrayed by her husband, drowned her children out of revenge. As punishment for this horrific act, La Llorona’s spirit is condemned to roam the earth for eternity, crying for her children.

== Theatrical and festival release ==
The Cry made its world debut Friday, May 12, 2007 at the Lensic Theater in Santa Fe, New Mexico, with the premiere sponsored by The Healy Foundation. In its opening weekend, The Cry made $6,968 at 4 cinemas, and overall made only $21,427 during its theatrical release. It then screened in several European film festivals, including the Cannes Film Festival on May 20, 2007, and the Ravenna Nightmare Film Festival on October 30, 2007, after which it was picked up for DVD distribution by Monterey Media.

== Reception ==
When the film was released on DVD in May 2008 it received mixed critical attention from the media. Sara Schieron of Box Office Movie Reviews panned the film by stating "...Less-than-middling attempt to exploit the potent Mexican myth of La Llorona (the crying woman) fails largely due to a crutch-like reliance on already weak genre conventions and haphazard script". Kryten Syxx of Dread Central also felt the film was meritless, and after watching it concluded, "Bernadine Santistevan has some talent hidden somewhere, but it sure isn’t used here". Being more forgiving, Justin Felix of DVD Talk wrote "Despite The Cry's letdown of an ending, it was still an interesting character-driven horror film". The Cry does have its supporters. Anthony Thurber of Film Arcade wrote, the "screenplay written by Santistevan and writer Monique Salazar was very frightening. They make this film haunting and very disturbing". Elliot Kotek of Moving Pictures Magazine stated, "Half the brilliance in the film's direction is its speed, so any awkward moments are over quickly and, by not over-penning the piece with long conversations, the filmmakers are rewarded with a rich rising tension often lacking in more fiscally-blessed flicks". And Best Horror Movies wrote "The Cry is suspenseful and shocking, especially in light of the victims of this terrible curse".
