= Martha Rofheart =

American novelist

- Rofheart with a copy of Cry God For Harry
- Born: Martha Jane Jones; May 27, 1917; Louisville, Kentucky, United States
- Died: June 19, 1990 (aged 73); New York City, United States
- Education: University of Cincinnati, Cincinnati, Ohio
- Occupation: Author
- Spouses: Robert Emhardt (m. 1943–1950); Ralph Rofheart (m. 1952)
- Writing career
- Period: 1970–1990
- Genre: Historical fiction
- Notable awards: A Daughter of Mark Twain
- Website: www.facebook.com/MarthaRofheartAuthor

Martha Rofheart (born Martha Jane Jones; 1917–1990) was an American writer of historical novels, an actress and early in her career, a model.

== Early life ==
She was born Martha Jane Jones, May 27, 1917, in Louisville, Kentucky, to Evan Jones and his wife, the former Noreen Sorrell. When her mother Noreen died in the 1918 flu pandemic, Martha was a year and a half old, and with her young father unable to care for her, she was raised by her paternal grandparents Evan Jones and his wife Elizabeth or Lizzy, who were of Welsh and Scottish extraction.

She grew up in the Portland, Louisville neighborhood, surrounded by a large upper-middle-class extended family, that was spread out along Portland Avenue and nearby streets. Her great-grandfather, W.O. Jones, and her grandfather, Evan Jones, were partners in a boiler works factory, C.J.Walton & Son, that employed some of her extended family as boilermakers, including her father, Evan Jones.

While she was still in the first grade, her grandfather would give her a quarter for each poem she wrote; growing up she had several poems published in Louisville newspapers and magazines, and at the age of 10, she won a national one-act play contest. Martha Jane attended the Louisville Public Schools, first at the Montgomery Street School through sixth grade, and then at Western Middle School, before graduating in 1934 from Shawnee High School (Kentucky), with Honors. She won a scholarship to the University of Cincinnati's Drama School, the College-Conservatory of Music, which she attended for two years. While attending college, she wrote to Lynn Fontanne of the acting couple The Lunts, and was invited by Miss Fontanne to audition in New York for their newly formed repertory theatre company.

== Career as a model and actress ==
After moving to New York City, she became a model with the Harry Conover agency. In 1940 the Ashcan School artist, John Sloan painted four portraits of her; "Lady From Louisville", "Blue Eyed Girl" and "Miss Jones" are all in the collection of the Delaware Art Museum, "Dramatics" also known as "Portrait of a Lady in Red", was sold at auction in 1984 and is in a private collection. As an actress in the 1940s and 1950s, Martha Jones made her Broadway debut with Alfred Lunt and Lynn Fontanne in The Pirate in 1942, and was Miss Fontanne's protege. She appeared in Blithe Spirit (play), Arsenic and Old Lace, The Heiress, The Respectful Prostitute, and other plays, both on Broadway and on tour in the United States and Canada. In July 1943, she married actor Robert Emhardt, with whom she debuted in The Pirate, then appeared in Harriet with on Broadway.

== Career as a writer ==
After her first marriage ended, she remarried in November 1952 to Ralph Rofheart, an art director and advertising executive, by whom she had one child Evan, in 1957. Soon after her son was born, she chose to be a full-time mother, and she stopped pursuing acting. In the late 1960s she began working as a freelance advertising copywriter. In the early 1970s, Rofheart wrote a novel of Henry V of England, Fortune Made His Sword, which was purchased, by William Targ, then the Editor-In-Chief of G. P. Putnam's Sons. It was optioned as a Book of the Month Club selection for March 1972, published in the UK as Cry God For Harry, London : Talmy, [1972]. Critic Granville Hicks, reviewing Fortune Made His Sword in The New York Times Book Review, wrote that Rofheart "deftly avoids the dangers" of writing about a subject that's "Shakespeare territory". Gilbert Highet, writing in the Book of the Month Club News for February 1971, had this to say: "Martha Rofheart has used her historical knowledge and her creative imagination to give us a splendid full scale portrait of a mighty man".

== Published work ==
After Fortune Made His Sword, Rofheart wrote five novels, Glendower Country, New York, Putnam [1973], in the UK published as Cry God for Glendower, London : Talmy Franklin, [1973], My Name Is Sappho, New York : Putnam, [1974], Burning Sappho in the UK, London : Talmy Franklin, [1975], a fictionalized theatrical family saga entitled The Savage Brood, New York : Putnam, [1974],The Alexandrian, New York : Crowell, [1976] a novel of Cleopatra and Lionheart!: A Novel of Richard I, King of England, New York : Simon and Schuster, [1981].

Several of Rofheart's novels were translated into German, Dutch, Spanish, Italian and Serbian. In May 2013, The Alexandrian was translated and published in Italy by Castelvecchi. Based upon her, "outstanding contribution to Modern fiction", with the publication of Glendower Country, Rofheart was elected on November 21, 1974, A DAUGHTER of MARK TWAIN, by Cyril Clemens and the Mark Twain Journal.

Fortune Made His Sword, Glendower Country, Lionheart and The Alexandrian were reissued as Kindle Books in 2015 by Endeavour Press, a UK eBook publisher. Two of Rofheart's short stories have been published in Kindle format: "An Evening With Lynn Fontanne", is based Martha's last visit with a very old Lynn Fontanne, and the second story, "The Peppermints", is based upon the author's recollections of her childhood in Louisville.

She died June 19, 1990, in New York City.
