= Tom Payne (basketball) =

American basketball player and boxer

Personal information
- Born: November 19, 1950 (age 75) Jefferson County, Kentucky, U.S.
- Listed height: 7 ft 2 in (2.18 m)
- Listed weight: 240 lb (109 kg)

Career information
- High school: Shawnee (Louisville, Kentucky)
- College: Kentucky (1970–1971)
- NBA draft: 1971: Hardship round, 2
- Drafted by: Atlanta Hawks
- Position: Center
- Number: 34

Career history
- 1971–1972: Atlanta Hawks

Career highlights
- First-team All-SEC (1971); Fourth-team Parade All-American (1969)
- Stats at NBA.com
- Stats at Basketball Reference

Thomas Robert Payne (born November 19, 1950) is an American former professional basketball player and boxer and convicted serial rapist.

A 7-foot, 2-inch center, Payne played with the Atlanta Hawks of the National Basketball Association (NBA) during the 1971-1972 season. He was also the first African American ever to play basketball for the University of Kentucky.

== Early years ==
The eldest of nine children, Payne broke one record at birth; he was the longest baby ever born at the local hospital. He grew up in a home where academics were stressed; his father had attained the rank of master sergeant in the United States Army before retiring, and his mother had a bachelor's degree in biology. His eight siblings were also well-educated, with a total of fourteen college degrees.

Despite his height and incredible physical skills, Payne was basically a newcomer to basketball. He didn't play organized basketball until his sophomore season at Shawnee High School at Louisville, Kentucky. By his senior season, he was one of the most coveted players in the nation, with Kentucky and UCLA recruiting him. On June 9, 1969, the high-school All-American signed with Kentucky; he was not only the tallest player ever to play at the school at that time, he was also legendary coach Adolph Rupp's first-ever African-American player.

== University of Kentucky ==
Touted as "another Lew Alcindor" (the player later known as Kareem Abdul Jabbar), Payne struggled in adjusting to college life at Kentucky. A low entering test score prevented him from playing on the Kentucky freshman team. (Freshmen were ineligible to play varsity basketball at the time.) He instead played for an AAU team called "Jerry's Restaurant."

Payne boosted his grades and gained eligibility to play during his sophomore season, averaging 17 points and 10 rebounds per game, earning all-Southeastern Conference honors along the way. Impressive as these numbers were, signs of trouble developed during the season. In a road game against the Tennessee Volunteers, Payne flipped Jim Woodall head over heels battling for a rebound. The referees whistled Payne for a flagrant foul and ejected him. In the rematch against Tennessee at Kentucky, Payne again flagrantly fouled Woodall, and was ejected from this game also. Payne was also ejected from a home game against Alabama for objecting to a referee's call. Payne's temper was exacerbated by racial slurs that he heard when playing in opposing venues.

For all his temper, Payne continued to improve during the season, and dominated opponents. He scored 34 points in one game against Georgia Bulldogs, and 39 against LSU. The future looked bright for Payne after he scored 30 points against Auburn, in a game that clinched the Southeastern Conference regular season title for Kentucky.

During the summer however, Payne experienced a variety of troubles. In August, a police officer cited him for speeding in his new Cadillac. The car was registered to a Pennsylvania auto dealer; it was rumored that teams from the NBA and American Basketball Association were coveting Payne and that the car was a gift from the Pittsburgh Condors of the latter league to apply for the ABA draft. Payne also had nine hours of incomplete grades that needed to be made up before he could return to Kentucky. With the slim likelihood of being eligible to play the following season, Payne left Kentucky and joined thirteen other underclassmen in the NBA's first-ever supplemental draft.

== Professional basketball ==
Payne was drafted by the Atlanta Hawks and, during the 1971–1972 season, averaged 4.1 points in 29 games.

== Career statistics ==
Legend
GP	Games played	GS	Games started	MPG	Minutes per game
FG%	Field goal percentage	3P%	3-point field goal percentage	FT%	Free throw percentage
RPG	Rebounds per game	APG	Assists per game	SPG	Steals per game
BPG	Blocks per game	PPG	Points per game	**Bold**	Career high

=== NBA ===
==== Regular season ====
Year	Team	GP	MPG	FG%	FT%	RPG	APG	PPG
1971–72	Atlanta	29	7.8	.437	.630	2.4	.5	4.1

==== Playoffs ====
Year	Team	GP	MPG	FG%	FT%	RPG	APG	PPG
1972	Atlanta	1	5.0	1.000	.400	4.0	.0	4.0

== Professional boxing record ==
Tom Payne
- Born: Thomas Robert Payne; November 19, 1950 (age 75); California, United States
- Other names: Tom
- Nationality: American
- Height: 7 ft 1 in (2.16 m)
- Weight: 280 lb (127 kg)
- Division: Heavyweight
- Stance: Orthodox
- Fighting out of: California, United States
- Years active: 1984-1985

Professional boxing record
- Total: 4
- Wins: 2
- By knockout: 2
- Losses: 2
- By knockout: 2

2 Wins (2 knockouts), 2 Losses
Res.	Record	Opponent	Type	Rd., Time	Date	Location	Notes
Loss	2-2	(United States) Randy Davis	KO	1 (6)	1985/06/06	(United States) El Cortez Hotel, San Diego, California, USA	
Win	2-1	(United States) Richie Montes	TKO	1 (6)	1985/02/21	(United States) El Cortez Hotel, San Diego, California, USA	
Loss	1-1	(United States) Ricky Reese	KO	1 (6)	1984/08/27	(United States) Forum, Inglewood, California, USA	
Win	1-0	(United States) Victor Serrano	KO	4 (4)	1984/06/23	(United States) Olympic Auditorium, Los Angeles, California, USA	

== Legal issues ==
In 1972, Payne was convicted of raping a woman and served five years in a Georgia prison. After completing his sentence in Georgia, Payne served six years in a Kentucky prison on separate rape charges before being paroled in 1983. However, Payne was again convicted of rape in 1986, this time in California. Payne was paroled in California in 2000, only to return to prison in Kentucky for a parole violation. Payne was paroled in January 2019. Payne said in a 2015 interview with WHAS-TV that he regretted his past behavior and was reformed.
