= Douglass Watson =

American actor (1921–1989)

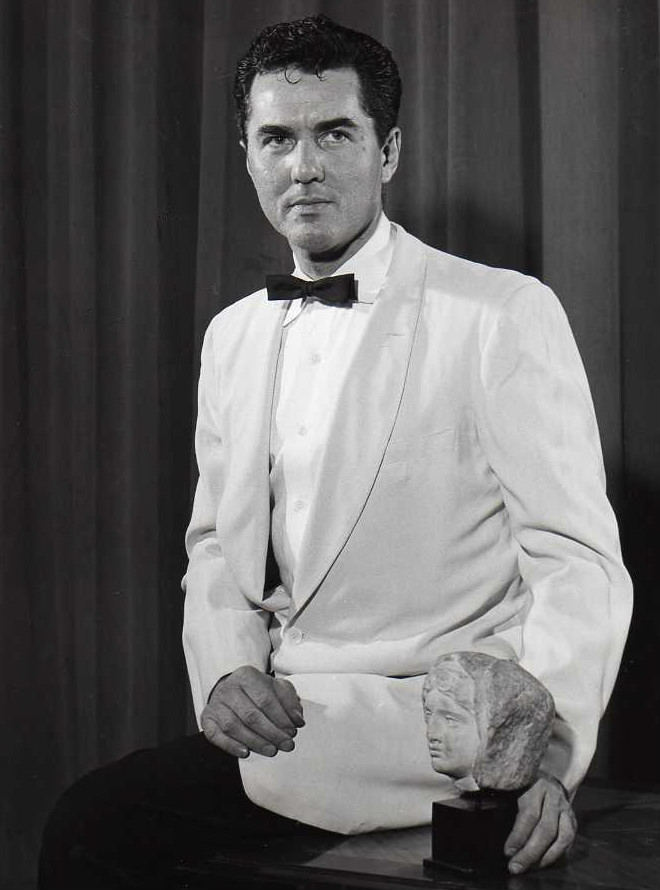
- Watson circa 1950s.
- Born: Larkin Douglass Watson III; February 24, 1921; Jackson, Georgia, U.S.
- Died: May 1, 1989 (aged 68); Bridgewater, Arizona, U.S.
- Occupation: Actor
- Years active: 1950–1989
- Spouse: Eugenia Laring-Clark (1941–1989; his death)
- Children: 3, including Randall

Larkin Douglass Watson III (February 24, 1921 – May 1, 1989) was an American actor. He was best known for his portrayal of Mac Cory on the daytime soap opera Another World.

== Life and career ==
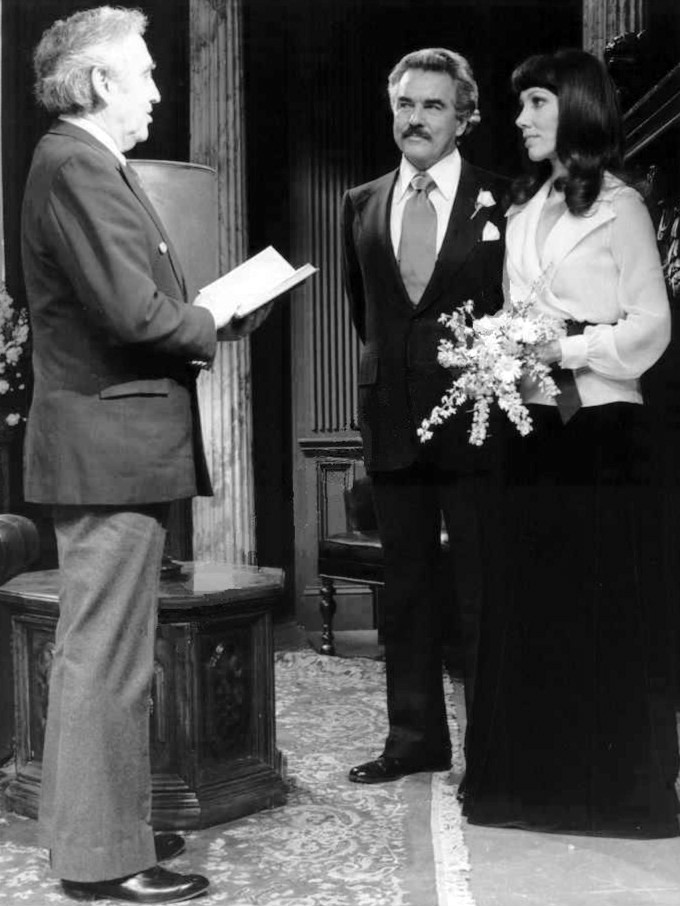
Watson, as Mackenzie Cory, marries Rachel Frame (Victoria Wyndham) on Another World, 1975.

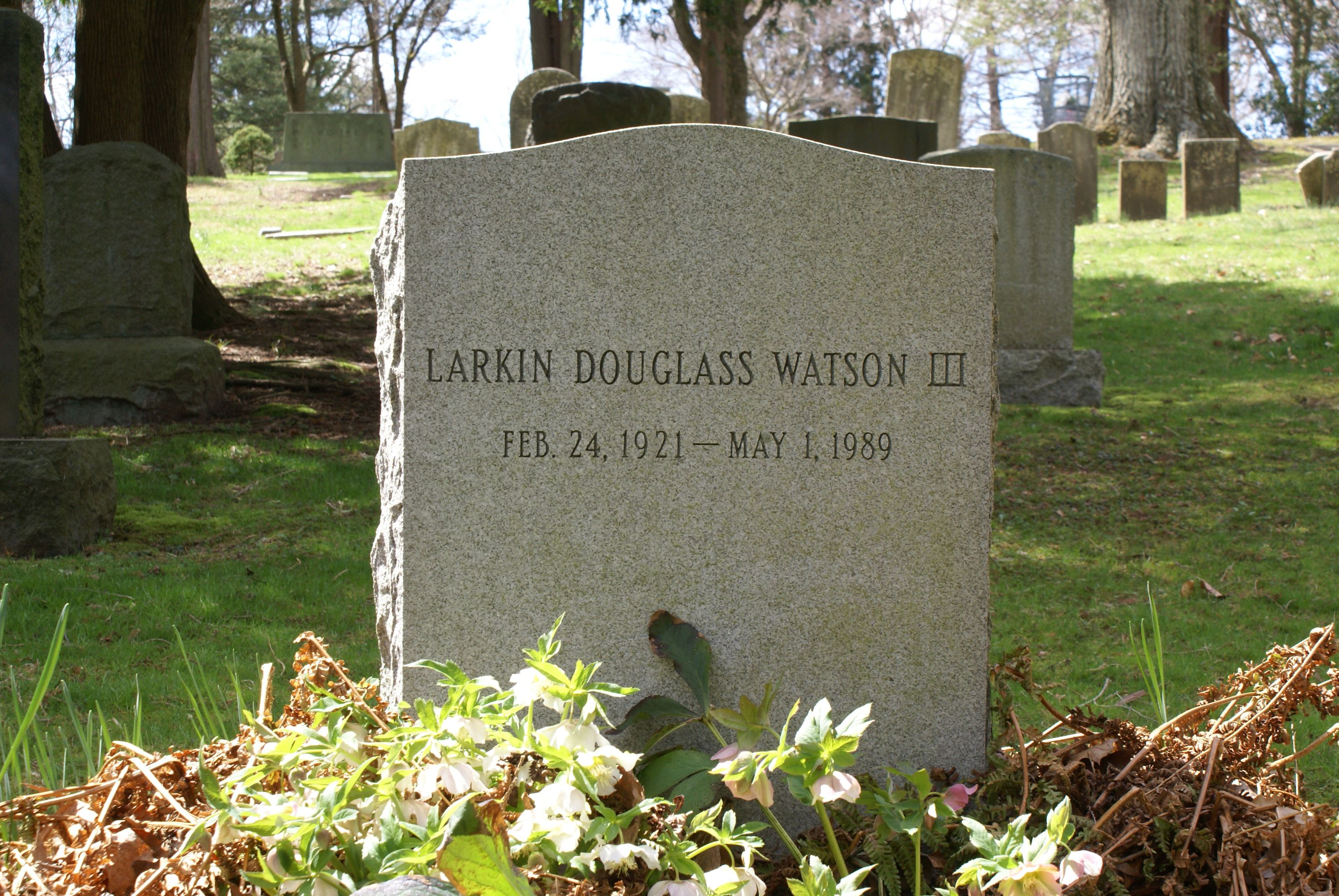
The grave of Douglass Watson

Watson was born in Jackson, Georgia, the son of Caroline (née Smith) and Larkin Douglass Watson, Jr., a teacher. Before his acting career, he received two Purple Heart awards for his service in World War II. A character actor since 1950, his most notable roles were in the movies Julius Caesar (1953), Sayonara (1957), and The Money Pit (1986). He was also an acclaimed actor on the New York stage, acting in several Broadway and Off-Broadway productions, including the 1952 Broadway revival of Desire Under the Elms by Eugene O'Neill. In addition, he played on such daytime dramatic dramas as Moment of Truth (1965) (a Canadian serial), Search for Tomorrow (1966–1968), and Love of Life (1972–1973).

Watson's most iconic role was wealthy publisher Mac Cory on the soap opera Another World. He was the second actor to play the role, taking over from Robert Emhardt. Watson earned the role after a critically acclaimed turn playing Kent in King Lear at the 1974 New York Shakespeare Festival. He portrayed the role from 1974 to 1989. He played the father of Tom Hanks' character in the 1986 film The Money Pit.

He won two Daytime Emmys for Best Actor, in 1980 and 1981. He was under contract at the time of his 1989 death of a heart attack, while on vacation in Arizona and the Connecticut Death Index gives the location as Bridgewater, Arizona. His character on the show also died shortly afterward.

== Filmography ==
Year	Title	Role	Notes
1953	Julius Caesar	Octavius Caesar	
1957	Sayonara	Colonel Crawford	
1971	Who Says I Can't Ride a Rainbow!		
1972	The Trial of the Catonsville Nine	Father Philip Berrigan	
1972	Ulzana's Raid	Maj. Cartwright	
1974	Parker Adderson, Philosopher	General	
1986	The Money Pit	Walter Fielding, Sr.	
