= Juliet Rylance =

English actress (born 1979)

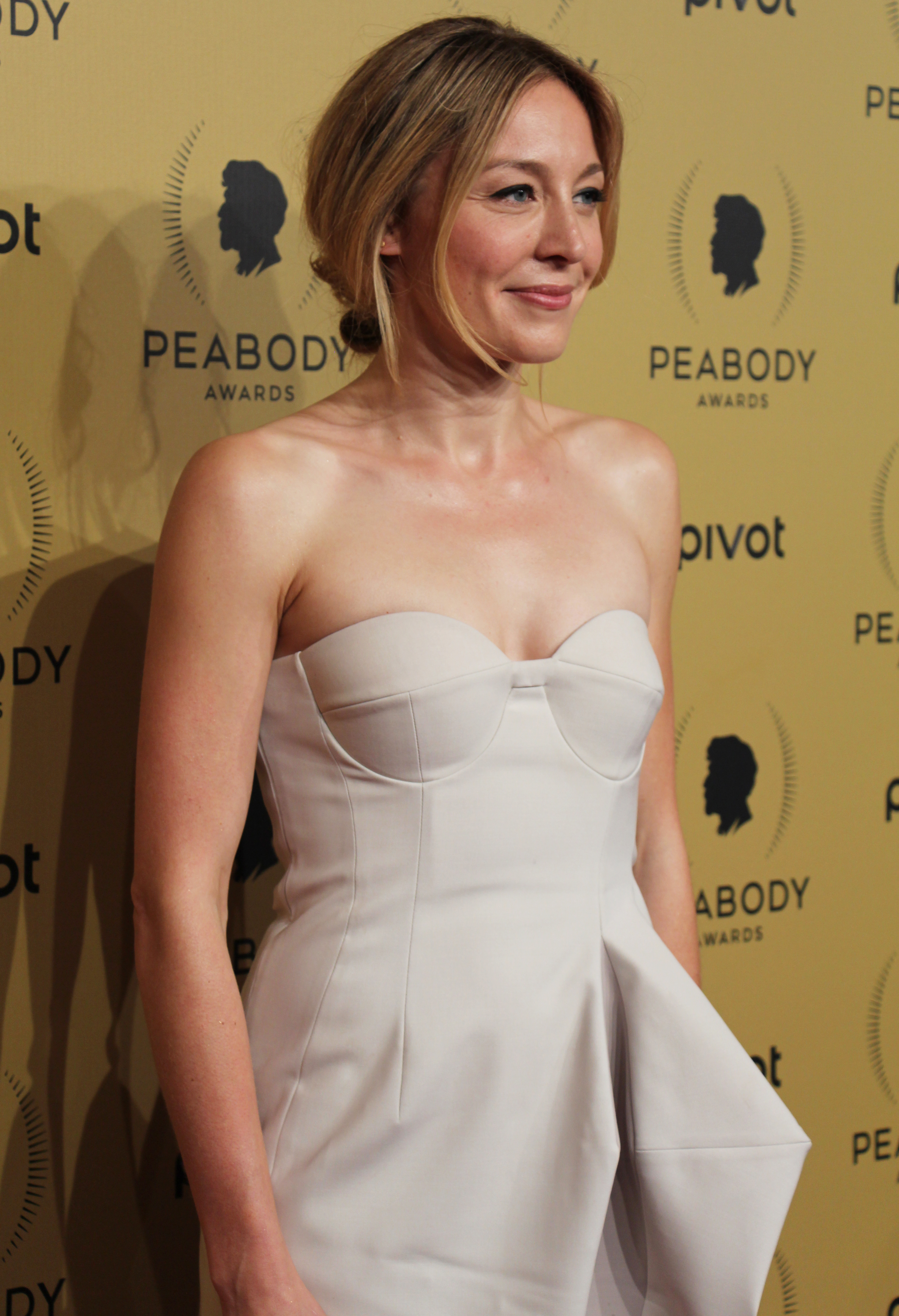
- Rylance in 2015
- Born: Juliet van Kampen; 26 July 1979 (age 47); Hammersmith, London, England
- Education: Royal Academy of Dramatic Art
- Occupation: Actress
- Years active: 2003–present
- Spouse: Christian Camargo (m. 2008; div. 2016)
- Parent: Claire van Kampen (mother)
- Relatives: Mark Rylance (stepfather)

Juliet van Kampen Rylance (born 26 July 1979) is an English actress, known for her roles in The Knick, McMafia and Perry Mason.

She is the daughter of composer Claire van Kampen and the stepdaughter of actor Mark Rylance.

== Early life and education ==
Rylance was born as Juliet van Kampen in Hammersmith, London, to Claire van Kampen, a composer, and Chris Perret, an architect. Her parents divorced when she was seven, and her mother subsequently married actor Mark Rylance, whose surname she adopted. She trained at the Royal Academy of Dramatic Art. Her younger sister, Nataasha (who died in 2012), became a filmmaker.

== Career ==
Her first major role upon leaving RADA was as Medea in Neil LaBute's Bash: Latter-Day Plays at the Union Theatre in London. She then went on to play Perdita in The Winter's Tale and Cressida in Troilus and Cressida at Shakespeare's Globe Theatre. She portrayed British writer Mary Sidney in I Am Shakespeare, written by her step-father Mark Rylance and directed by Matthew Warchus at the Chichester Festival Theatre and its UK tour. That same year, along with two of her contemporaries, David Sturzaker and director Tamara Harvey, she started her own production company, Theater of Memory. She subsequently starred in the Theater of Memory's productions of Romeo and Juliet and Bash: Latter-Day Plays, portraying Juliet and Medea respectively.

In 2009, Rylance played Desdemona in New York City, in Othello, for which she was nominated for a Lucille Lortel Award. She next appeared in the Sam Mendes-directed Bridge Project, a joint venture between the Brooklyn Academy of Music in Brooklyn and The Old Vic in London. She appeared as Rosalind and Miranda, respectively, with her husband appearing alongside her as Orlando and Ariel. Rylance was awarded a 2010 Obie Award for her performance as Rosalind.

In 2012, Rylance co-starred in the horror film Sinister. In 2013, she appeared in and produced the film Days and Nights, based on the Anton Chekhov play The Seagull, and written and directed by her husband.

== Personal life ==
In 2008, Rylance married actor Christian Camargo at New York City Hall. They met when he worked with her stepfather, Mark Rylance, at Shakespeare's Globe Theatre. They divorced after nine years of marriage around 2016–2017.

== Acting credits ==
=== Film ===
Year	Title	Role	Director	Notes
2003	The Burl	Julie	Toby Tobias	Short film
2005	Animal	Maria Nielson	Roselyne Bosch	
2012	Sinister	Tracy Oswalt	Scott Derrickson	
2012	Frances Ha	Janelle	Noah Baumbach	
2013	Days and Nights	Eva	Christian Camargo	
2015	Sinister II	Tracy Oswalt	Ciarán Foy	
2015	Amok	Lisa	R.E. Rodgers	Alternative title: "Adam Shaw"
2017	A Dog's Purpose	Elizabeth Montgomery	Lasse Hallström	
2017	Love After Love	Rebecca	Russell Harbaugh	
2019	The Artist's Wife	Angela Smythson	Tom Dolby	
2019	The Hypnotist's Love Story	Ellen	Francesca Gregorini	TV film
2021	Jill	Joann	Steven Michael Hayes	
2024	Arthur the King	Helena Light	Simon Cellan Jones	

=== Television ===
Year	Title	Role	Notes
2014–2015	The Knick	Cornelia Robertson	Series regular, 20 episodes
2015	The Mystery of Matter	Marie Curie	Episode: "Unruly Elements"
2016	American Gothic	Alison Hawthorne-Price	Series regular, 13 episodes
2018	McMafia	Rebecca Harper	Series regular, 8 episodes
2020–2023	Perry Mason	Della Street	Series regular, 16 episodes

=== Theatre ===
Year	Title	Role	Venue	Notes	Ref
2005	Troilus and Cressida	Cressida	Shakespeare's Globe, London		
2005	The Winter's Tale	Perdita	Shakespeare's Globe, London		
2007	Bash: Latter-Day Plays	Medea	Trafalgar Theatre, London		
2007	I Am Shakespeare	Mary Sidney	Chichester Festival Theatre, Chichester	also, UK tour	
2008	Romeo and Juliet	Juliet	Middle Temple Hall, London		
2009	Othello	Desdemona	Theatre for a New Audience, New York City		
2010	The Tempest	Miranda	Brooklyn Academy of Music, New York City	with "The Bridge Project"	
2010	As You Like It	Rosalind	Brooklyn Academy of Music, New York City	with "The Bridge Project"	
2011	Three Sisters	Irina Sergeyevna Prozorova	Classic Stage Company, New York City		
2011	The Cherry Orchard	Varya	Classic Stage Company, New York City		
2012	Ivanov	Sasha	Classic Stage Company, New York City		
2013	The Winslow Boy	Catherine	American Airlines Theatre, New York City		

== Awards and nominations ==
Year	Award	Category	Work	Result
2009	Lucille Lortel Awards	Outstanding Featured Actress in a Play	Othello	Nominated
2010	Obie Awards	Best Off-Broadway Performance	As You Like It	Won
2015	Satellite Awards	Best Ensemble - Television (with Michael Angarano, Jeremy Bobb, Leon Addison Brown, David Fierro, Matt Frewer, Eve Hewson, Grainger Hines, André Holland, Eric Johnson, Maya Kazan, Clive Owen, Cara Seymour & Chris Sullivan)	The Knick	Won

== See also ==
- List of British actors
