= Matt Crane =

American television actor (born 1967)

- Born: May 4, 1967 (age 59); Kimberton, Pennsylvania, U.S.
- Education: University of Honolulu; American Academy of Dramatic Arts
- Occupation: Television actor
- Spouse: Robin Christopher (m. 2000)

Matt Crane (born May 4, 1967) is an American television actor. He is best known for playing Matthew Cory in the American soap opera television series Another World from 1988 to 1999.

== Life and career ==
Crane was born in Kimberton, Pennsylvania. He attended the University of Honolulu and the American Academy of Dramatic Arts. He was a model, motorcycle racer, and a sculptor.

Crane began his career in 1987, appearing in the military drama television series Tour of Duty. He guest-starred in television programs including War and Remembrance, Gidget, Sex and the City and Step by Step. In addition to his guest-appearances, he played Matthew Cory in Another World from 1988 to 1999, and Ross Duncan in General Hospital in 2004.
