= Story of a Bad Boy (film) =

1999 American dramedy film

- Theatrical film poster
- Directed by: Tom Donaghy
- Written by: Tom Donaghy
- Produced by: Jean Doumanian
- Starring: Jeremy Hollingworth; Christian Camargo; Julie Kavner; Stephen Lang
- Cinematography: Garrett Fisher
- Edited by: Barbara Tulliver
- Music by: Angelo Badalamenti; Chris Hajian
- Release dates: June 23, 1999 (Frameline); July 12, 2001 (Germany)
- Running time: 85 mins.
- Country: United States
- Language: English

Story of a Bad Boy is a 1999 American independent coming-of-age coming-out LGBTQ+ romantic dramedy film written and directed by Tom Donaghy. The film stars Jeremy Hollingworth, Christian Camargo, Julie Kavner, and Stephen Lang. It premiered at the Frameline Film Festival in 1999.

== Synopsis ==
17-year-old Pauly is a closeted high school kid who wants it all. His dad wants him to make the track team, his mom wants him to do well in the band, and Pauly just wants to get closer to the new student teacher doing the school play.

== Cast ==
- Jeremy Hollingworth as Pauly
- Christian Camargo as Noel
- Julie Kavner as Elaine
- Stephen Lang as Spyros
- Lauren Ward as Ludmilla
- Howie Ravikoff as Colin
- Cherelle Cargill as Carla
- Chris Payne Gilbert as Mark
- Bill Velin as Jimmy
- Gerry Becker as Mr. Fontaine

== Reception ==
Gay Films Matter lauded the film: "The film is modest and occasionally too tidy, but its humour and affection for its young protagonist give it considerable charm." MsPacClown of The Avocado praised the acting: "Lead actor Jeremy Hollingworth gives a droll, deadpan performance. Julie Kavner (aka the voice of Marge Simpson) is allowed more nuance as the boys' savvy mother." Zachary Wild of The Rectangular View rated it 3/5 stars, but chided the screenplay: "[The film] is a quirky comedy that could have used more story development before making it to the big screen."
