= Duet (Star Trek: Deep Space Nine) =

- Star Trek: Deep Space Nine episode
- Episode no.: Season 1 Episode 19
- Directed by: James L. Conway
- Story by: Lisa Rich; Jeanne Carrigan-Fauci
- Teleplay by: Peter Allan Fields
- Production code: 419
- Original air date: June 14, 1993

Guest appearances
- Harris Yulin as Marritza; Marc Alaimo as Gul Dukat; Ted Sorel as Kaval; Tony Rizzoli as Kainon; Norman Large as Captain; Robin Christopher as Neela

Episode chronology
← Previous "Dramatis Personae"	Next → "In the Hands of the Prophets"
- Star Trek: Deep Space Nine season 1

"Duet" is the 19th episode of the American science fiction television series Star Trek: Deep Space Nine.

Set in the 24th century, the series follows the adventures on Deep Space Nine, a space station located near the planet Bajor, as the Bajorans recover from a brutal decades-long occupation by the imperialistic Cardassians. In this episode, Major Kira Nerys, the ranking Bajoran officer on the station, finds herself compelled to confront an apparent Cardassian war criminal, who may be lying about his identity.

The episode has received critical acclaim, both for the quality of its performances and for the moral issues explored by the story.

== Plot ==
A freighter docks at Deep Space Nine so one of its passengers may receive treatment for a condition called Kalla-Nohra, which was caused by a mining accident at a brutal labor camp called Gallitep during the occupation of Bajor. As the patient is a Cardassian, Major Kira has the man arrested as a war criminal, only to find his name, Aamin Marritza, is not listed for any crimes. Station commander Benjamin Sisko sees no option but to release Marritza, but Kira is adamant - Marritza is a Cardassian who was present at Gallitep, which is reason enough. Sisko decides to investigate further and has the man held in custody. Citing a conflict of interest, Sisko asks Kira to remove herself from the case, but her emotional plea and a promise that she will remain professional convince him to let her continue. When she interrogates Marritza, he says that he was only a file clerk at Gallitep.

A photograph from Gallitep reveals that the man being held is not Aamin Marritza but the camp's commander, Gul Darhe'el, the "Butcher of Gallitep" who reportedly murdered thousands of Bajorans. When confronted with this information, the prisoner proudly admits to being Darhe'el; however, inconsistencies in his story begin to stand out. Gul Dukat, the Cardassian former prefect of the occupation, asserts that Darhe'el is dead—his funeral was widely attended, and half of the Cardassian population viewed his body in state—and forwards a copy of Darhe'el's death certificate to Constable Odo as proof. Furthermore, Darhe'el wasn't on Bajor at the time of the Kalla-Nohra disaster and thus could not possibly have the syndrome. Dr. Bashir discovers that the prisoner has undergone cosmetic surgery, leading Kira to realize that he is indeed Marritza, but is deliberately impersonating Darhe'el.

Kira confronts the prisoner with this information. Marritza eventually breaks down in tears, branding himself a coward for not attempting to stop the atrocities at Gallitep. He begs Kira to prosecute him as Darhe'el, as he intended all along, insisting that Cardassia must be forced to admit its wrongdoings and Bajor must have the satisfaction of successfully prosecuting a Cardassian war criminal. Kira releases Marritza, realizing he is a good man so traumatized and remorseful from his experiences that he would give up his life to make amends. Kira escorts Marritza to a ship departing from the station. On the way out of the Promenade, Marritza is suddenly stabbed to death by a Bajoran. When Kira demands to know why, the Bajoran echoes her earlier sentiment: that being a Cardassian is reason enough. Kira, having had a change of heart, asserts that it is not.

== Production ==
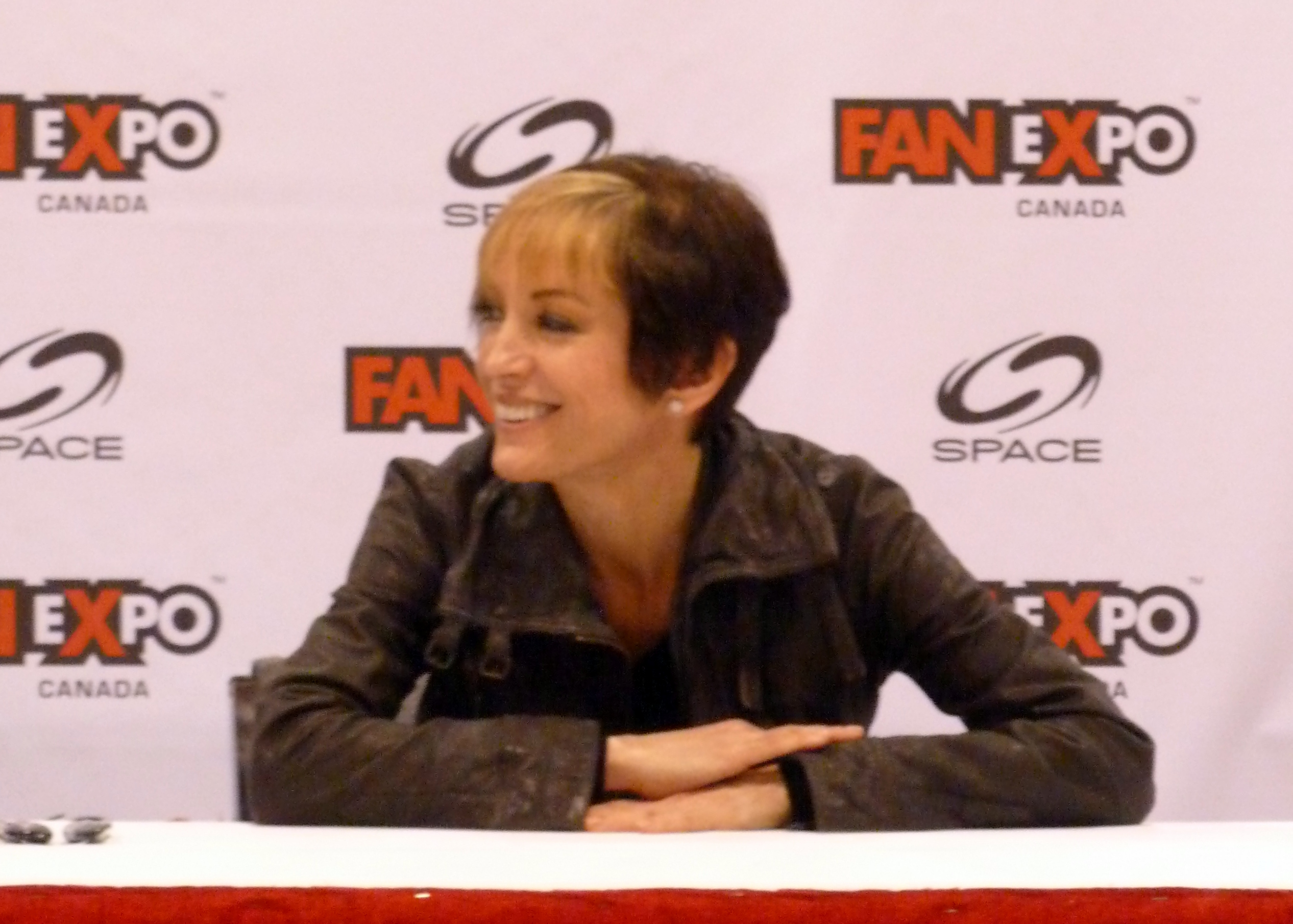
Nana Visitor stars as the Bajoran officer Kira Nerys

The episode was written by Peter Allan Fields, based on a story by Lisa Rich and Jeane Carrigan-Fauci. The director of the episode is James L. Conway.

=== Development ===
The episode features significant character development on the part of Kira Nerys. It has been suggested that this may be the first episode in which the Cardassian occupation of Bajor can be seen as alluding to the establishment of Israel and Nazi persecution of Jews. Originally titled "The Higher Law" and resembling an existing dramatization based on the Nuremberg Trials, the story was reshaped by Peter Fields and Ira Steven Behr with reference to Robert Shaw's The Man in the Glass Booth, which tells of a Jewish man who is accused of being a Nazi war criminal.

The producers of Star Trek: Voyager attempted to re-create the critical success of "Duet" with their first-season episode "Jetrel". According to DVD commentary accompanying Voyager's second season, "Jetrel" was a conscious effort to use a similar delivery to create a metaphor for the aftermath of the atomic bombings of Hiroshima and Nagasaki. In that episode, the character Neelix is forced to confront the scientist who developed a weapon which eradicated thousands of his people.

== Reception ==
"Duet" was featured in Museum of Television and Radio's 1994 "Tribute to Excellence" and became a fan favorite, described by Startrek.com as "one of DS9's – possibly even one of Trek's – finest [hours]". It was included in several editors' choices for a feature there entitled "You're Stranded on a Desert Asteroid ... Our Best of the Best Episodes", described by editor Sandy Stone as "when I knew DS9 really had something going on". The episode "is all substance, completely engrossing in its conveyance, and it also features a tragic ending" according to Jammer's Reviews, an independent science fiction portal. "I'm not sure I can write a coherent analysis of this episode," Michelle Erica Green of the popular fan site The Trek Nation began her review in 2004. "I cried just thinking about it for two days after I saw it, and I still cry when I try to discuss it." It has nonetheless been noted by some fans that certain parts of the exposition appear rushed, while the believability of Marritza's death scene has been questioned. This can be attributed to the need to contain the episode, as the episode is "hardly [a] story worthy of a multi-episode arc".

Cast and crew responded positively to the episode as well. In the Star Trek: Deep Space Nine Companion, Armin Shimerman (Quark) observed that the episode works because of "the writing and the directing and the acting all coalescing perfectly", which Nana Visitor (Kira) believed was because it had "such important things to say". Notable staff to list it among their favorites are Behr, Next Generation producer Dave Rossi and Companion author Terry J. Erdmann.

The interrogation scenes between Kira and Marritza, particularly an exchange wherein Marritza shifts the focus to Kira's personal life and reverses the questioning, have been compared to exchanges between Jodie Foster's character and Hannibal Lecter (Anthony Hopkins) in The Silence of the Lambs.

A 2015 binge-watching guide for Star Trek: Deep Space Nine by Wired recommended not skipping this essential episode.

In 2016, Radio Times rated the death of the character Marritza as the 26th greatest scene in Star Trek, including scenes from movies and television. In 2016, The Hollywood Reporter ranked "Duet" as the seventh best of Star Trek: Deep Space Nine. They rated the episode the 35th best episode of all Star Trek episodes to date.

In a 2016 article highlighting the best episode from each Star Trek series, Digital Trends gave "Duet" an honorable mention. In 2018, Vulture ranked "Duet" as the 13th best episode of Star Trek: Deep Space Nine. In 2019, Den of Geek ranked this episode the sixth best morality play of the Star Trek franchise.

In 2016, Empire ranked it the 33rd best out of the top 50 episodes of all the 700 plus Star Trek television episodes.

In 2016, Vox rated this one of the top 25 essential episodes of all Star Trek.

In 2016, IGN ranked "Duet" the tenth best episode of all Star Trek series. They note this episode for exploring the horrors of future-war, as Kira takes on her own sense of justice when confronted with what may be a Cardassian war criminal.

In 2017, Radio Times ranked this episode the fifth best episode of Star Trek, especially for those unfamiliar with the franchise. They note it touches upon themes of "desperation and forgiveness", although differentiating between the different science fiction aliens may be necessary.

In 2018, SyFy recommend this episode for its abbreviated watch guide for the Bajoran character Kira Nerys. They offer blunt praise for the plot and acting, remarking: "The story sounds simple; the performance is anything but." (SyFy) They say actress Visitor's performance as Kira in this episode goes beyond being brilliant.

In 2019, ComicBook.com ranked "Duet" the fourth best episode of Star Trek: Deep Space Nine.

In 2020, The Digital Fix ranked this episode as the sixth best episode of the series, describing it as "character drama at its finest" and an overall standout episode from the first season. They praised Nana Visitor and Harris Yulin's performances, saying Yulin gave his character a "gentle, sympathetic charm" and were impressed by the episode's dramatic ending.

In 2020, Den of Geek listed "Duet" as one of the best stories of Star Trek: Deep Space Nine.

In 2020, io9's James Whitbrook listed "Duet" as one of the "must-watch" episodes of Deep Space Nine, praising it as a standout from season one and an early example of "the gutwrenching highs" the series can achieve.

The UK science fiction magazine and website SciFiNow ranked this one of the top ten episodes of Star Trek: Deep Space Nine in 2020, calling it a "brilliant" episode that demonstrates the show's potential.

== Releases ==
This episode was released in 2017 on DVD with the complete series box set, which had 176 episodes on 48 discs.

== See also ==
- "He's Alive"
- The Holocaust in the arts and popular culture
- The Man in the Glass Booth – 1975 film by Arthur Hiller
