= Robin Christopher =

American actress

- Born: Revere, Massachusetts, U.S.
- Occupation: Actress
- Years active: 1987–present
- Spouse: Matt Crane (m. 2000)
- Children: 2

Robin Christopher is an American actress. She is known for her role as Skye Chandler Quartermaine on the ABC soap operas All My Children, One Life to Live, and General Hospital.

== Early life ==
Christopher was born in Revere, Massachusetts. She turned down a fine arts scholarship to Boston University to pursue an acting career. Until her acting career took off, she supported herself working as a model and appeared on Romance novel covers.

== Career ==
Christopher is the only actor to have played the same character (Skye Chandler) as a regular cast member on all three of ABC's soap operas: All My Children (1987–91, 2000), One Life to Live (1999–2001) and General Hospital (2001–08, 2010–12). She earned two nominations for a Daytime Emmy Award for Outstanding Supporting Actress in a Drama Series in 2003 and 2005. Christopher portrayed Lorna Devon on Another World (1994–97). In both roles, on two different networks, Christopher's biological mother was portrayed by soap opera star Linda Dano, who played Skye's mother, Rae Cummings, on All My Children, One Life to Live, Port Charles, and General Hospital, and Lorna's mother, Felicia Gallant, on Another World.

When Christopher began playing Skye Chandler, the character was known as Skye Patterson. Over the years, the character married, divorced, remarried, redivorced, and believed on two occasions to have discovered and grown closer to her biological family, the Chandlers on All My Children and Quartermaines on General Hospital, only to discover her biological origins to be far murkier than originally realized.

In accord with Skye's nomadic journey through the ABC soaps and ultimate independence, Robin Christopher has often been referred to by fans as the 'Greta Garbo of soap opera', evoking in her performance the glamour and emotional depth of Classical Hollywood cinema.

In 1993, Christopher guest starred in two episodes of Star Trek: Deep Space Nine's first season, "Duet" and "In the Hands of the Prophets", as the Bajoran engineer Neela.

== Personal life ==
Christopher has been married to her former Another World co-star Matt Crane since 2000 and they have two children together.

== Filmography ==
Film and Television
Year	Title	Role	Notes
1987–91, 2000	All My Children	Skye Chandler	Role from: March 1987 to March 1991, July 2000
1991	Empire City	Kelly Carnahan	
1992	Vinnie & Bobby	Kendall Borden	
1992	Bodies of Evidence	Monica	
1993	Matlock	Janis Wilson	
1993	Star Trek: Deep Space Nine	Neela	
1994–97	Another World	Lorna Devon	
1999–2001	One Life to Live	Skye Chandler	Role from: August 1999 to April 2001
2001–08, 2010–12	General Hospital	Skye Chandler Quartermaine	Role from: April 2001 to January 2008, March to July 2010, August to September 2011, November to December 2012
