= Classic Stage Company =

Off-Broadway theater company

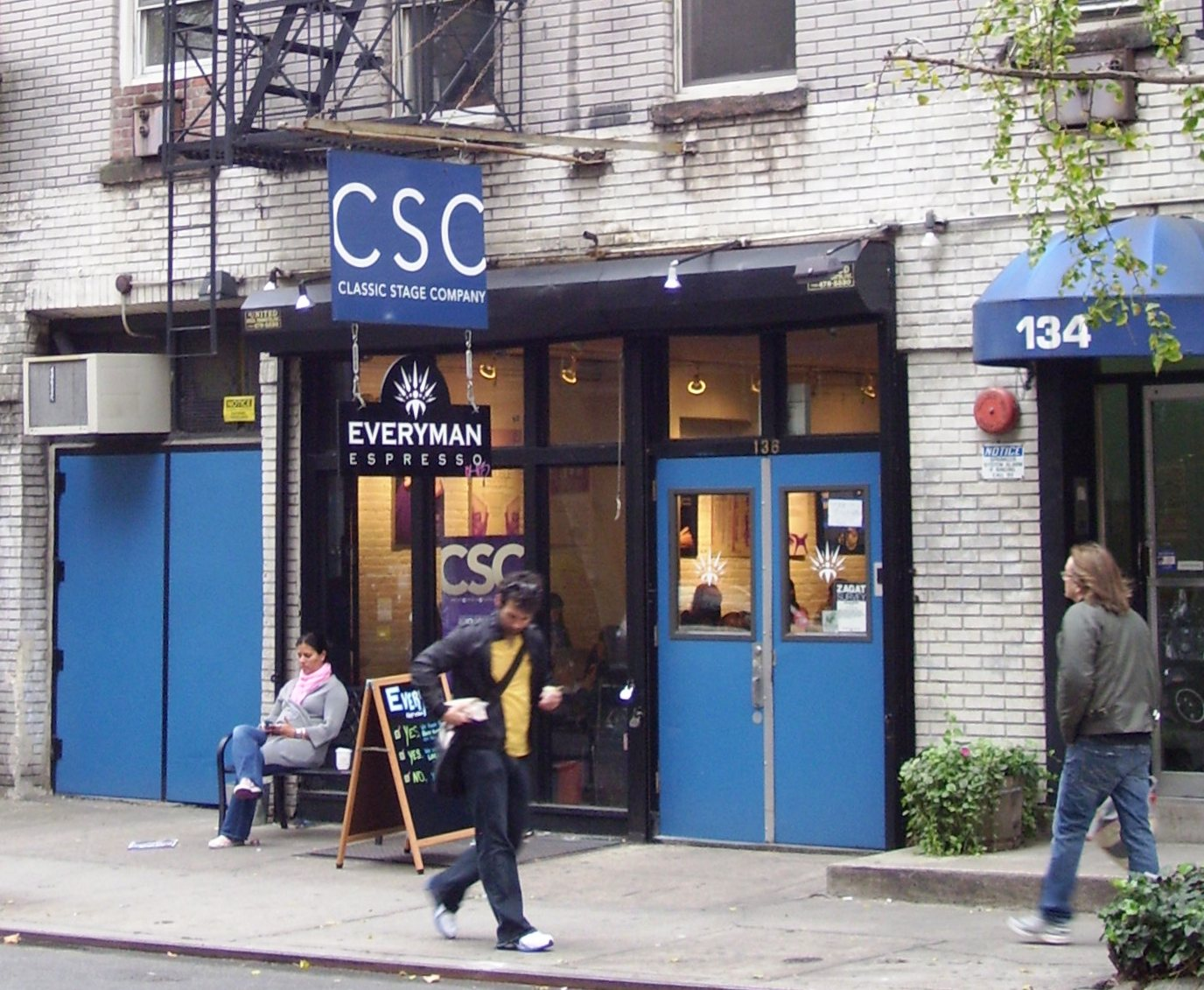
- Interactive map of Classic Stage Company
- Address: 136 East 13th Street; Manhattan, New York City; United States
- Coordinates: 40°43′58″N 73°59′18″W
- Capacity: 199
- Type: Off-Broadway

Construction
- Opened: 1967

Website
- www.classicstage.org

Classic Stage Company, or CSC, is a classical Off-Broadway theater company. Founded in 1967, Classic Stage Company is one of Off-Broadway's oldest theater companies.

CSC is led by Producing Artistic Director Jill Rafson. John Doyle previously served as Artistic Director from 2016 until 2022. CSC's 199-seat Lynn F. Angelson Theater is the former Abbey Theatre located at 136 East 13th Street between Third and Fourth Avenues in the East Village near Union Square, Manhattan, New York City.

CSC's productions have been cited repeatedly by the major Off-Broadway theater awards: Obie Award, Drama Desk Award, Outer Critics Circle Award, Drama League Award and 1999 Lucille Lortel Award for Outstanding Body of Work.

== Productions ==
Recent productions include: Turgenev's A Month in the Country with Peter Dinklage and Taylor Schilling; Rodgers & Hammerstein's Allegro; Brecht's The Caucasian Chalk Circle with Christopher Lloyd, and Galileo with F. Murray Abraham; Stephen Sondheim and James Lapine's Passion with Melissa Errico, Judy Kuhn, and Ryan Silverman; Chekhov's Ivanov with Ethan Hawke, The Cherry Orchard with Dianne Wiest and John Turturro, Three Sisters with Maggie Gyllenhaal, Jessica Hecht, Juliet Rylance and Peter Sarsgaard, Uncle Vanya with Maggie Gyllenhaal, Denis O'Hare, and Peter Sarsgaard, and The Seagull with Dianne Wiest and Alan Cumming; David Ives' The Heir Apparent, Venus in Fur with Nina Arianda (Broadway transfer 2011/2012, Tony Award nom., Best Play), The School for Lies with Hamish Linklater, and New Jerusalem with Richard Easton; Unnatural Acts, conceived by Tony Speciale; Anne Carson's An Oresteia; and Shakespeare's Hamlet with Peter Sarsgaard, The Tempest with Mandy Patinkin, A Midsummer Night's Dream with Bebe Neuwirth, and Richard III, Richard II, and Hamlet with Michael Cumpsty.

Prominent artists who have worked at Classic Stage Company include F. Murray Abraham, Wes Bentley, Zoe Caldwell, Kathleen Chalfant, Alan Cumming, Peter Dinklage, Mamie Gummer, Maggie Gyllenhaal, Ethan Hawke, Amy Irving, Bill Irwin, Cherry Jones, Ron Leibman, Taylor Mac, Camryn Manheim, Frances McDormand, Kate Mulgrew, Bebe Neuwirth, Cynthia Nixon, Chris Noth, Jim Parsons, Mandy Patinkin, Christina Ricci, Joely Richardson, Amber Chardae Robinson, Juliet Rylance, Ruben Santiago-Hudson, Peter Sarsgaard, Liev Schreiber, Taylor Schilling, Tony Shalhoub, Mira Sorvino, Jean Stapleton, David Strathairn, Michael Stuhlbarg, Jason Sudeikis, John Douglas Thompson, Uma Thurman, Stanley Tucci, and John Turturro.

== Artistic directors ==
- Christopher Martin (1967–1984)
- Craig Kinzer (1984-1986)
- Carey Perloff (1987–1992)
- David Esbjornson (1992–1998)
- Barry Edelstein (1998–2003)
- Brian Kulick (2003–2016)
- John Doyle (2016–2022)
- Jill Rafson (2022-)

== Awards ==
Classic Stage Company has won awards for many of its productions.

- Village Award from the Greenwich Village Society for Historic Preservation (2002)
