= Barbara Romer =

German film producer

Barbara Romer, born 1970 in Bielefeld, is a German film producer, a former management consultant at McKinsey & Company and a former manager at Soho House. Romer is the founder of the New Globe Theater, an organization that proposed building a contemporary Shakespearean Globe. Norman Foster was the proposed project's architect.

Romer graduated from Princeton University in 1993 and received a Ph.D. from Cambridge University in 1998.

== Filmography ==
- Days and Nights (2013): Producer
