= Robert Emhardt =

American actor (1914–1994)

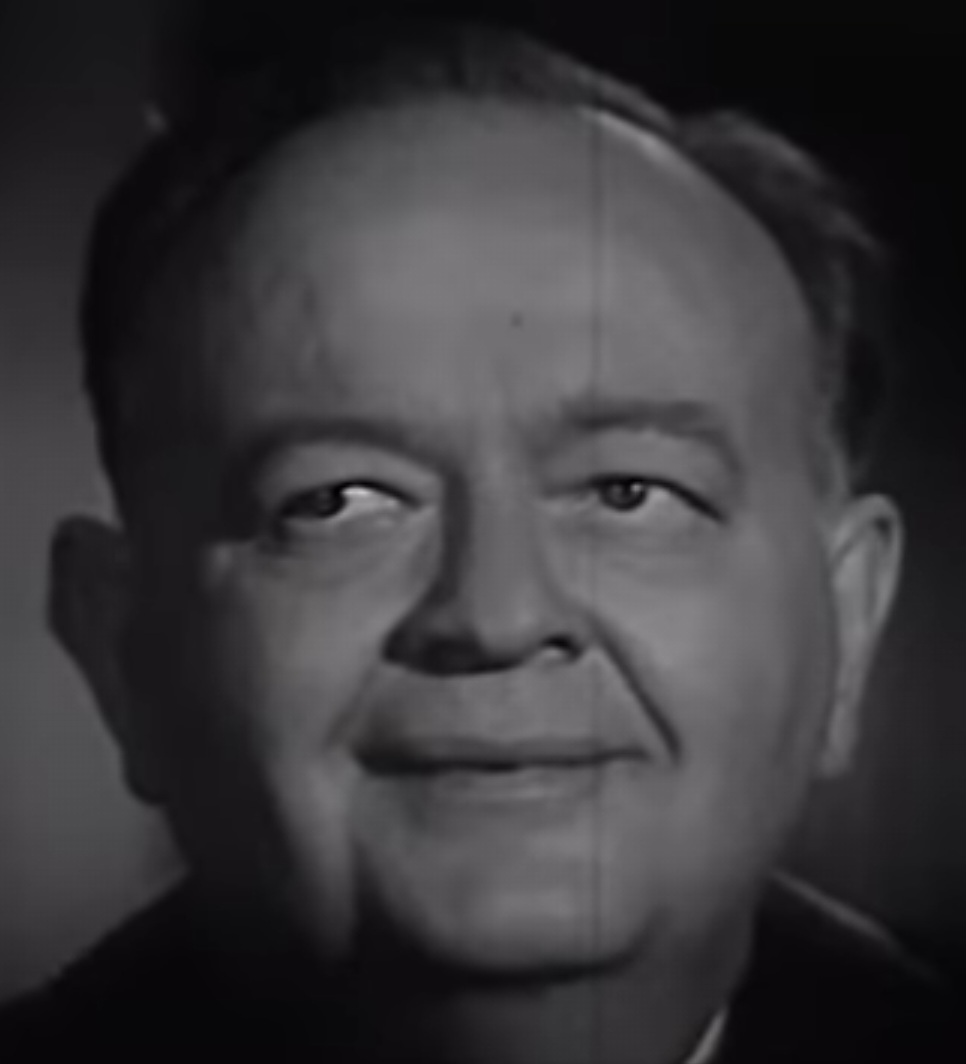
- Emhardt in an episode of One Step Beyond (1959)
- Born: Robert Christian Emhardt; July 24, 1914; Indianapolis, Indiana, U.S.
- Died: December 26, 1994 (aged 80); Ojai, California, U.S.
- Education: Royal Academy of Dramatic Art
- Occupation: Actor
- Years active: 1939–1982
- Spouse(s): Martha Rofheart (Martha Jones; 1943–1950); Silvia Sideli (1954–1994; his death; 4 children)

Robert Christian Emhardt (July 24, 1914 – December 26, 1994) was an American character actor who worked on stage, in film, and on television. Emhardt was frequently cast as a villain, often a crooked businessman or corrupt politician.

== Early years ==
Emhardt was born in Indianapolis, Indiana.

== Career ==
Emhardt studied acting at the Royal Academy of Dramatic Art in London. He began his Broadway career in the 1930s as an understudy for the equally heavyset Sydney Greenstreet. Emhardt made his stage debut in The Pirate (1942). One of the founding members of the Actors Studio, Emhardt was a member of the cast of the original 1952 Broadway stage production of The Seven Year Itch. He won the Critics Circle Award for best supporting actor for his performance in Life with Mother in the 1948–1949 season.

His notable film appearances include 3:10 to Yuma (1957) and Underworld U.S.A. (1961).

On television, he was the first actor to play Mac Cory on Another World. He also made over 250 guest appearances on such series as Alfred Hitchcock Presents, Riverboat, The Tall Man, The Twilight Zone, GE True, Stoney Burke, Going My Way, The Untouchables, Perry Mason (three episodes), Naked City, The Tom Ewell Show, My Three Sons, The Wild Wild West, The Andy Griffith Show (two episodes), Gunsmoke, The Man From U.N.C.L.E., The Invaders, Adam-12, The Brady Bunch, Cannon, Kojak, The Mary Tyler Moore Show, Bonanza, Have Gun - Will Travel, Mannix and Quincy, M.E.

== Personal life and death ==
Emhardt married actress Martha Jones (later married name Martha Rofheart) in 1943, with whom he had appeared on Broadway in both Harriet and The Pirate. After the dissolution of the marriage, he married actress Silvia Sideli in 1954. They had a son named Christopher and a daughter named Mia.

Emhardt died of heart problems at his home in Ojai, California, on December 26, 1994, at the age of 80.

== Filmography ==
- Marco Millions (1939 TV movie)
- The Dagmar Story (1951 TV movie) – Pa Lewis
- The Iron Mistress (1952) – General Cuny
- The Big Knife (1955) (uncredited)
- 3:10 to Yuma (1957) – Mr. Butterfield, Stage Line Owner
- The Badlanders (1958) – Sample
- Wake Me When It's Over (1960) – Joab Martinson
- Underworld U.S.A. (1961) – Earl Connors
- The Intruder (1962) – Verne Shipman
- Kid Galahad (1962) – Maynard
- The Magnificent Yankee (1965 TV movie) – Henry Adams
- Diamond Jim: Skulduggery in Samantha (1965 TV movie) – Schindler
- The Group (1966) – Mr. Andrews
- Hostile Guns (1967) – R. C. Crawford
- Where Were You When the Lights Went Out? (1968) – Otis J. Hendershot Sr.
- Rascal (1969) – Constable
- Change of Habit (1969) – The Banker
- Suppose They Gave a War and Nobody Came (1970) – Lester Calhoun
- The Boy Who Stole the Elephant (1970 TV movie) – Cy Brown
- Lawman (1971) – Hersham
- Lock, Stock and Barrel (1971 TV movie) – Sam Hartwig
- Scorpio (1973) – Man in hotel
- The Stone Killer (1973) – Fussy Man
- Night Games (1974 TV movie) – Judge Ambrose
- Rex Harrison Presents Stories of Love (1974 TV movie)
- It's Alive (1974) – The Executive
- The F.B.I. Story: The FBI Versus Alvin Karpis, Public Enemy Number One (1974 TV movie) – Dr. Willards
- Demon, Demon (1975 TV movie)
- Alex & the Gypsy (1976) – Judge Ehrlinger
- The Chopped Liver Brothers (1977 TV movie) – Duffy
- Fraternity Row (1977) – Brother Bob Abernathy
- It Happened One Christmas (1977 TV movie) – Judge
- The Seniors (1978) – The Bishop
- Die Sister, Die! (1978) – James Lendon Price
- Pleasure Cove (1979 TV movie) – Fat Man at Bar
- Institute for Revenge (1979 TV movie) – Senator
- Aunt Mary (1979 TV movie) – Berwick
- Forced Vengeance (1982) – Carl Gerlich

== Partial television credits ==
- Alfred Hitchcock Presents (1955–1959)
  - season 1 episode "Don't Come Back Alive" (1955) – Mr. Kettle
  - season 2 episode "De Mortuis" (1956) – Professor Rankin
  - season 2 episode "Crackpot" (1957) – Mr. Moon
  - season 2 episode "Martha Mason, Movie Star" (1957) – Henry G. McKay
  - season 3 episode "The Right Kind of House" (1958) – Mr. Waterbury
  - season 5 episode "Road Hog" (1959) – Ed Fratus
- Kraft Television Theatre (two-part teleplay "All the King's Men") (1958)
- Alcoa Presents: One Step Beyond (episode "Make Me Not a Witch") (1959) – Priest
- Perry Mason (episode "Case of the Ominous Outcast") (1960) – J.J. Flaherty
- The Twilight Zone (episode "Static") (1961) – Professor Ackerman
- The Barbara Stanwyck Show (episode "The Golden Acres") (1961) – Ben
- The Andy Griffith Show (1963) (season 3 episode "Man in a Hurry") – Malcolm Tucker
- Bob Hope Presents the Chrysler Theatre (episode:"A Killing at Sundial") (1963)
- The Alfred Hitchcock Hour (season 3 episode "Return of Verge Likens") (1964) – Riley McGrath
- Perry Mason (1965) season 9, episode 6 "The Case of the Carefree Coronary" – Arthur Wendell
- The Wild Wild West (episode "The Night of the Tottering Tontine") (1967) – Martin Grevely & (episode "The Night of the Two-legged Buffalo") (S1 E23) - Claude Duchamps
- Mannix (1967) S1 E7 "Warning: Live Blueberries" as Ralph Warden, the crooked owner of a hippie nightclub which features Buffalo Springfield performing "For What it's Worth".
- Adam-12 (episode "Anniversary") (1971) – George Moore
- Another World (1973–1974) – Mac Cory
- The Rookies (1975) Season 4, Episode 4 "Someone who cares"
