= Victoria Wyndham =

American actress (born 1945)

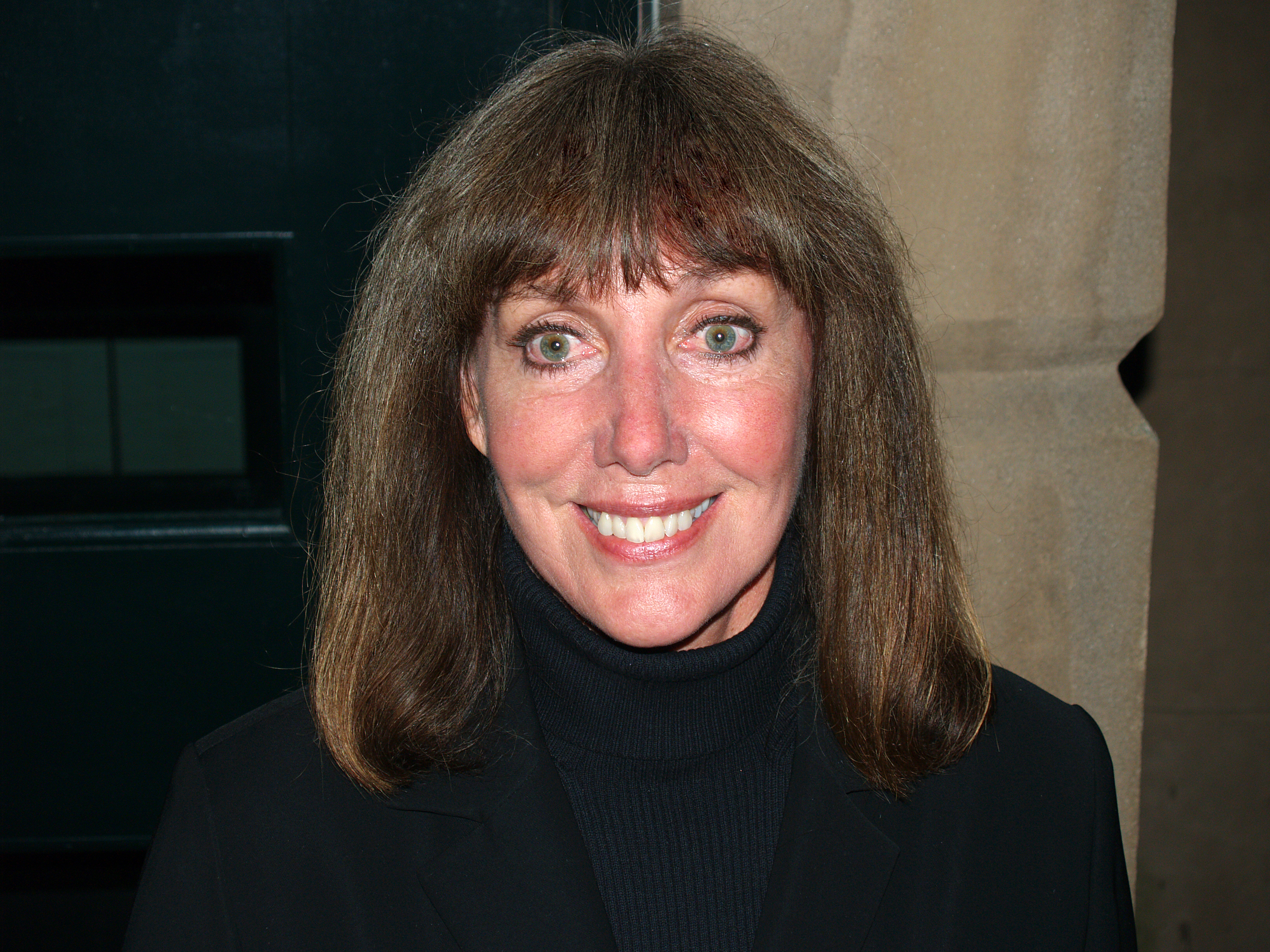
- Wyndham in 2007
- Born: Victoria Camargo; May 22, 1945 (age 81); Chicago, Illinois, U.S.
- Education: Bennett College
- Occupation: Actress
- Years active: 1967–present
- Spouses: Wendell Minnick (divorced)
- Children: 2, including Christian
- Father: Ralph Camargo

Victoria Camargo (born May 22, 1945), known professionally as Victoria Wyndham, is an American actress best known for her role as Rachel Cory on the soap opera Another World.

== Early years ==
Born on May 22, 1945, in Chicago, Victoria Camargo, Wyndham is the daughter of Florence Skeels and Mexican-American stage and screen actor Ralph Camargo. She grew up in Bridgeport, Connecticut, and graduated from Bennett College. Her sister is stage actress Felice Camargo.

== Early career ==
Wyndham started her acting career as understudy in the role of Hodel in the Broadway production of Fiddler on the Roof. She went on to perform cabaret with Lily Tomlin for two years at Upstairs at the Downstairs.

== Daytime television credits ==
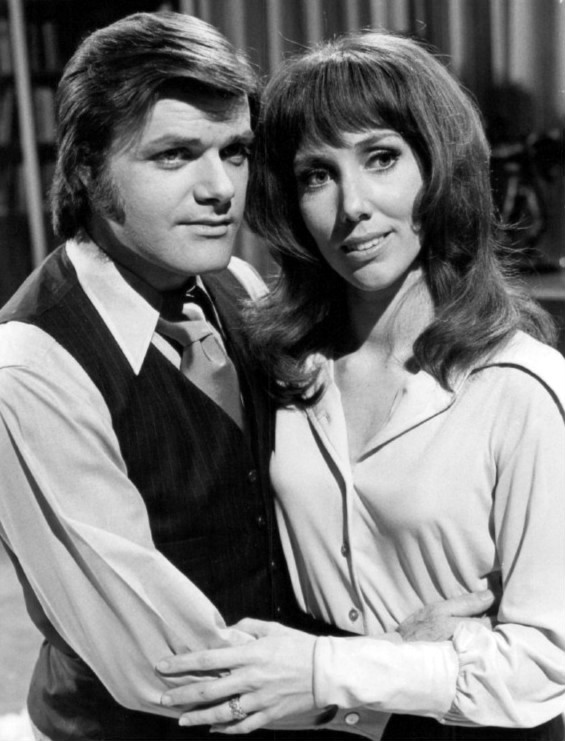
As Rachel with George Reinholt on Another World, 1973.

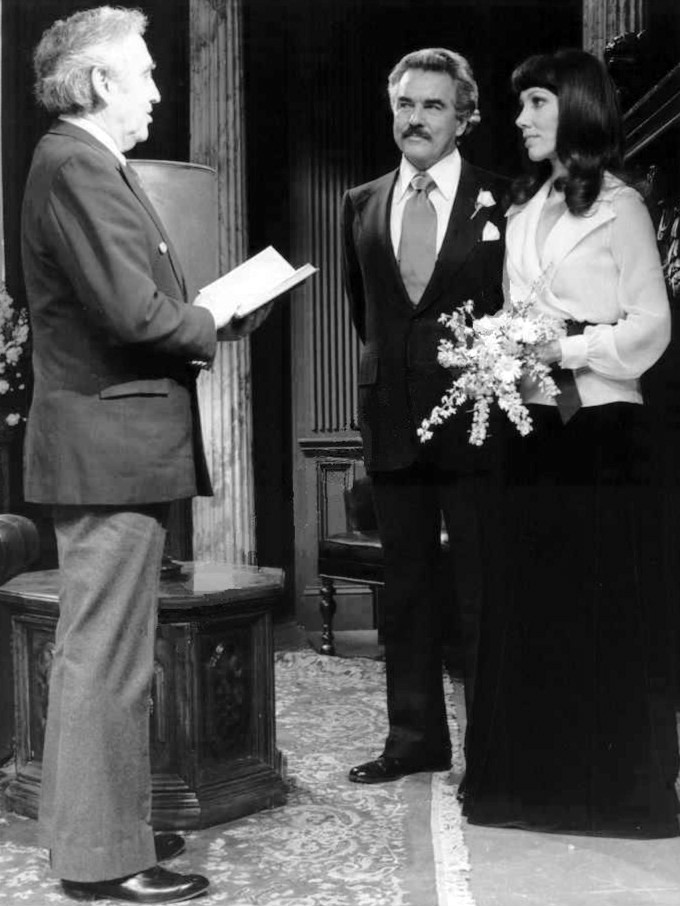
Wyndham as Rachel marries Mac Cory, 1975. Her father, Ralph, was the justice of the peace for the scene. It was the first time the two had acted together.

Wyndham first made a name for herself when she played Charlotte Waring Fletcher Bauer, (posing as Tracy Delmar) on the soap opera Guiding Light from 1967 to 1971. When she left The Guiding Light, she became a hot commodity in casting circles, with many soap operas offering contracts to her. She admitted in a TIME magazine interview that she almost did not follow through with a career in soap operas. Wyndham said, "When I first went into soaps, I didn't tell my serious acting friends. I thought they'd laugh. But now I'm proud of my work; some of the best acting, best moments are in this medium." She was subsequently cast on the soap opera Another World in the role of Rachel, for which she is perhaps best known. Wyndham succeeded actress Robin Strasser in the role and portrayed Rachel from 1972 until the show ended in 1999. Wyndham also was a writer.

When Wyndham took over the role from Strasser, the character was a villain. The head writer at the time, Harding Lemay, was impressed by Wyndham's range and decided to take the character in different directions. The character of Rachel was reformed after being paired with a much-older book publisher, Mackenzie Cory (Douglass Watson). It made Wyndham very popular with fans and proved to be very lucrative as well. Although highly regarded, Wyndham did have one peculiar run-in with a fan: author Annie Gilbert, in the book All My Afternoons, noted that Wyndham was mildly assaulted when an enraged fan, fed up with Rachel's scheming ways and thinking Wyndham was her character, attempted to punch her at a Lord & Taylor store in New York City, all the while screaming, "I hate you! I hate you!"

In the later years of the program, Wyndham took on the double role of Justine Duvalier, Rachel's new husband Carl's ex-lover. She played the dual role for two years (1995 and 1996) before Justine was killed off. Wyndham was honored with a special episode showcasing her noteworthy performances on Another World in July 1997. At the time of the show's cancellation, she was the longest-running performer on the series.

== Later career ==
Wyndham appeared in an episode of Law & Order: Special Victims Unit on January 2, 2007, as Rita Colino, a former wife of the dead partner of Brian Dennehy's character.

== Filmography ==
Year	Title	Role	Notes
1954	Woman With a Past	Diane Sherwood	Daytime serial (temporary replacement for Felice Carmango)
1967-1971	The Guiding Light	Charlotte Waring Fletcher Bauer #1 (also used alias of Tracy Delmar)	Daytime serial (contract role)
1972-1999	Another World	Rachel Davis Frame Cory Hutchins #3	Daytime serial (contract role)
1972-1999	Another World	Justine Duvalier	Daytime serial (recurring role 1995-1996)
1995	Terror in the Shadows	Kay Nealy	Television film (NBC)
2007	Law & Order: Special Victims Unit	Rita Colino	Episode: "Scheherazade"

== Personal life ==
Wyndham married investment broker Wendell Minnick. Her sons are actor Christian Camargo (né Christian Minnick) and photographer Darian Minnick.

== Awards, honors and nominations ==
Daytime Emmy Awards
Year	Category	Work	Result	Ref
1978	Outstanding Lead Actress in a Drama Series	Another World	Nominated	
1979	Outstanding Lead Actress in a Drama Series	Another World	Nominated	

Soap Opera Digest Awards
Year	Category	Work	Result	Ref
1986	Outstanding Contribution by an Actor/Actress to the Form of Continuing Drama who is currently on a Daytime Serial	Another World	Nominated	

Soapy Awards
Year	Category	Work	Result	Ref
1978	Soapy Award for Outstanding Actress	Another World	Won	
