= Flowers in the Attic (1987 film) =

1987 film by Jeffrey Bloom

- Theatrical release poster by Tom Jung
- Directed by: Jeffrey Bloom
- Screenplay by: Jeffrey Bloom
- Based on: Flowers in the Attic by V. C. Andrews
- Produced by: Sy Levin; Thomas Fries
- Starring: Victoria Tennant; Kristy Swanson; Jeb Stuart Adams; Louise Fletcher
- Narrated by: Clare C. Peck
- Cinematography: Gil Hubbs
- Music by: Christopher Young
- Production company: Fries Entertainment
- Distributed by: New World Pictures
- Release date: November 20, 1987
- Running time: 91 minutes
- Country: United States
- Language: English
- Budget: $3.5 million
- Box office: $15.2 million

Flowers in the Attic is a 1987 American psychological horror film directed by Jeffrey Bloom and starring Louise Fletcher, Victoria Tennant, Kristy Swanson, and Jeb Stuart Adams. Its plot follows four youngsters who, after the death of their father, are held captive in the attic of their abusive grandmother's sprawling estate by their cruel and manipulative mother. It is based on V. C. Andrews' 1979 novel of the same name.

At one point, Wes Craven was scheduled to direct the film, and had completed a screenplay draft. Producers were disturbed by his approach to the incest-laden story, and Jeffrey Bloom ended up with writing and directing duties.

== Plot ==
After the sudden death of their father, teenagers Chris and Cathy Dollanganger and 5-year-old twins Cory and Carrie are forced to travel with their mother Corrine to live with her wealthy parents, who disowned her years ago.

Corrine's mother Olivia, a religious fanatic, takes in her daughter and grandchildren on the condition that the children must be sequestered in a locked room, so her dying husband Malcolm will never know of their existence. The children are shut inside one of the mansion's bedrooms, with access only to the attic via a secret stairway. Their grandmother reveals the truth of what caused Corrine to be stricken from her father's will: Corrine's husband was her father's half-brother, making their children the product of incest. Returning to the children that night, Corinne is forced to show that she has been bullwhipped by her mother as punishment for marrying her uncle and having his children. Corrine explains that because her father does not know about the children, she still has a chance to inherit his fortune when he soon dies.

The children struggle with their confinement as their mother's visits become infrequent, and they clash with their strict grandmother. Olivia becomes obsessed with the belief that Chris and Cathy are lovers, echoing Corrine and her uncle. Finding them sleeping in the same bed, Olivia smashes Cathy's ballerina music box, her father's gift. She discovers the siblings talking while Cathy is bathing. Chris chases her away, but Olivia ambushes Cathy in the bedroom, locks Chris in the closet and hacks off Cathy's hair. She starves them for a week and Chris is forced to feed Cory his own blood.

The children are often sick, especially Cory and Carrie. Chris and Cathy remove the hinges from their locked door to occasionally sneak out where they discover that their mother has been living a life of luxury and dating a young lawyer, Bart Winslow. Corrine visits the kids and they confront her for neglecting them, but she storms out. Cory becomes deathly ill. Olivia and Corrine agree to take him to the hospital, but Corrine returns to inform the children that Cory has died. The children are devastated, but they find their pet mouse dead after eating a cookie Cory did not finish. Chris discovers that Cory and the mouse were killed by arsenic in the sugar on the cookies they are served with breakfast. Believing their grandmother has been poisoning them, the siblings decide to escape.

Chris sneaks out to steal money before they flee, and learns their mother will marry Winslow at the mansion the next morning. Chris suggests they sneak out during the wedding in fancy clothes from the attic. When Olivia enters the next day, hoping to catch them in an "evil" act, Chris beats her unconscious with a bedpost. Though he intends to fully beat her to death, Cathy stops him and says that they should tell their grandfather the truth; they had once found him sleeping while investigating their mother's absence. They find his room empty with the bed dismantled; their grandfather has been dead for months. They also find a copy of his will, two months old, with a clause that if it is ever revealed, even after his death, that Corrine had children from her first marriage, she will be disinherited. The children realize that Corrine, not their grandmother, was poisoning them to secure her inheritance.

Crashing the wedding, the three children expose their mother to the guests and the groom. They repeatedly yell at her and call her “mom” though she refuses to acknowledge them as her children. Cathy and Chris scold her for breaking her promise to free them after her father died. Chris explains that they found the recent will. Corrine denies their accusations, but Chris displays the dead mouse as proof. Cathy tries to force her mother to eat an arsenic-coated cookie, chasing her onto a balcony. Cathy corners her mom at the edge where Corrine falls off, hanged by her own veil. The children leave the mansion as their grandmother looks on with scorn.

The narrator, an older Cathy, explains that the children survived on their own; Chris became a doctor and Cathy resumed dancing, although growing up, Carrie was "never truly healthy". Cathy wonders if her grandmother is still alive at Foxworth Hall, expecting she (Cathy) will eventually return.

== Cast ==
- Louise Fletcher as Olivia Foxworth, Malcolm's wife, a religious fanatic
- Victoria Tennant as Corrine Dollanganger
- Kristy Swanson as Cathy Dollanganger
- Jeb Stuart Adams as Chris Dollanganger
- Ben Ganger as Cory Dollanganger
- Lindsay Parker as Carrie Dollanganger
- Nathan Davis as Malcolm Foxworth, Olivia's husband
- Brooke Fries as Flower Girl
- Alex Koba as John Hall, the butler
- Leonard Mann as Bart Winslow
- Bruce Neckels as Minister
- Gus Peters as Caretaker
- Clare C. Peck as Narrator (Cathy as an adult)
- V. C. Andrews as Window-washing maid (uncredited)

== Production ==
=== Development ===
V. C. Andrews herself demanded, and eventually received, script approval when she sold the film rights to producers Thomas Fries and Sy Levin. She turned down five scripts (the violent and graphic screenplay by Wes Craven was rejected by the producers, though), before choosing the script by Jeffrey Bloom, who would also direct. Bloom's script was the one that was the closest to the novel, but as he did not have full control over the matter of the film, the numerous producers and the two studios forcefully made changes to the script. Several plot points and themes of the novel were stripped from the film, including the incestuous relationship between the oldest siblings. Bloom said there was a lot of conflict in production, but he could do nothing to talk the producers out of the many drastic changes made in the script.

Originally, Bloom wanted David Shire to score the film, but Christopher Young was chosen by the producers instead.

=== Casting ===
Veteran actresses Louise Fletcher and Victoria Tennant were cast as the Grandmother and Mother, respectively, while the four children were played by newcomers Kristy Swanson, Jeb Stuart Adams, Ben Ganger, and Lindsay Parker, respectively. Swanson once stated that when V.C. Andrews met her, she said Swanson was just like she pictured Cathy.

Being a fairly low-budget production, Bloom said, big names were not considered for any role in the film. Jeffrey Bloom had a young Sharon Stone audition for the film, but he could not convince the producers to give her the part of Corrine, the mother.

=== Filming ===
Louise Fletcher wanted to get deep inside her role, so she called Andrews one night to ask about the motivation of her character in the film. She was also so into the part, that she stayed strictly within the character of the Grandmother all the time, even when she was not shooting. "I couldn't let myself think about distractions like what a beautiful day or what are we going to have for lunch?" she said in an interview.

Andrews was given a cameo as a maid in Foxworth Hall, scrubbing the glass of a window after Chris and Cathy attempt to escape from the rooftop.

Bloom stated that, after filming was completed, the producers approached him to refilm a new ending, and one of the many ideas was that the siblings accidentally kill Corinne during their escape. Bloom tried to talk them out of it and when he was unable to convince them otherwise, he eventually quit. The new ending, partly inspired by the ending of Wes Craven's own screenplay, was eventually filmed by someone else.

Castle Hill, a Tudor Revival mansion in Ipswich, Massachusetts, served as Foxworth Hall and was the main location at which nearly all interior and exterior scenes were filmed. The beginning scene shows the children walking towards the front of the house after being dropped off by the bus. In reality the bus stop is at the end of the rolling green where the lawn ends and the ocean begins. The final scene of the film, where Cathy pushes her mother Corrine off of the balcony and her bridal veil gets caught in the trellis, strangling her to death, was filmed at Greystone Mansion in Beverly Hills, California.

=== Post-production ===
Jeffrey Bloom had no involvement in the final edit of the film, as he had walked off the set, and the new ending was inserted. He also stated that scenes involving incest between Chris and Cathy were cut.

Bloom's original early cut of the movie was screened to a test audience in December 1986 in San Fernando Valley, and it was met with negative reactions, mostly because of the scenes of incest between Cathy and Chris. The test audience, mostly consisting of female adolescents (the same demographic the book series was targeted towards), reported in test cards that they were revolted by the scenes and another where Corrine disrobes in front of her father to be whipped by her mother. They also disliked the original ending, where Olivia tries to kill the children with a butcher knife, because they found it to be "too horrific."

The producers insisted on a new ending because they thought that the audience for the film would want to see the children take revenge on Corrine, so an unknown director was brought in to film the new ending where Corrine dies (despite the fact that her character lives in the first three books in the series). While most of the movie was filmed in Massachusetts, the new ending was filmed in California. The film was severely re-cut. This was done not just to remove "sensitive content" but also to make it shorter to secure more theatrical screenings, as well as the addition of the infamous new ending that writer and director Jeffrey Bloom hated and refused to film. The film was then again screened to a test audience in January 1987. This version was met with more positive feedback and was the version that was released in theaters. Due to drastic re-editing, the film was pushed back to November from its original release in March, almost an entire year later than Bloom's original cut was completed and test screened.

One of the scenes deleted from the final cut of the film was shown in a TV program covering the behind-the-scenes production of the film. It is an extended scene from when Chris and Cathy enter Corrine's bedroom. It shows Cathy going about the room wondering why there are no pictures of Corrine's children or her husband in the room. Another deleted scene was shown being filmed where Corrine and Olivia confront each other after Cory's death and the latter is shown smiling, indicating that she was involved in Cory's funeral.

According to Bloom in a 2010 interview, nudity and scenes of incest were not cut out solely because of negative feedback from test audiences, but also because the studio and the producers wanted to secure a lower rating. Even the "small shots and small suggestive stuff" were cut out to make sure that the film received a PG-13 rating from the MPAA.

Kristy Swanson stated in a 2014 interview that there was a test screening which had all scenes of incest included, but after the audience found them to be uncomfortable, they were cut out. Producer Sy Levin also mentioned that one of the cut scenes had Chris watching Cathy through the crack of the door while she was taking off her clothes and getting into a bathtub. Also, test screenings of the film in San Jose and Ohio, after re-editing, were said to include another alternate ending, but no further details were reported. According to a Los Angeles Times interview (at the time when the movie was released in theaters) with actor Alex Koba who played butler John Hall, just like in Andrews' novel, his character had a much bigger role in the original script and also provided a key surprise plot twist. After several rewrites, his character was severely reduced and had only one line of dialogue in the entire film ("Good evening, Mr. Winthrop"), and the butler had become little more than a gloomy figure in black who wheels a serving cart back and forth across the screen; as a result, the plot twist was gone. Koba also said about different versions of the endings for the movie: "They had three different endings for that movie, and they picked the worst one, the one you're seeing now." In another, earlier article it was also mentioned that Bloom's original intended ending was very similar to the ending of the original book, and it included the children simply walking out of their attic prison into the sunshine during the wedding, to symbolize growing up, Bloom said, with "the way to freedom clear." It is not known whether this version of the ending was included only in Bloom's original script, or whether it actually was filmed and is the second alternate ending that was shown in some test screenings. Despite interest from fans, no uncut version of the film was released, nor was Bloom's original director's cut, and it is not known if the deleted footage still exists.

According to Bloom, the original ending consisted of:

Briefly, the surviving children interrupt the wedding ceremony and dramatically confront Corrine. All in attendance are horrified by what the children say about how their mother locked them up and poisoned them. The groom is shocked speechless. Olivia is outraged. The grandfather is there, in his wheelchair, to hear it all. Corrine denies everything, but it doesn't matter; it's too late. The children's story is bolstered by the fact that they look half dead. They leave the wedding but before leaving the house, Olivia tries to attack them [with a big knife]. They're saved by John Hall, the butler. Olivia is subdued by him and the children leave.

== Release ==
=== Box office ===
Flowers in the Attic opened theatrically in the United States on November 20, 1987, debuting at number 3 at the national box office. It went on to gross $15.2 million in the United States.

=== Critical reception ===
The film received mostly negative reviews from critics and fans of the book, who both disliked the film's slow pacing, acting and plot changes. On the review aggregator website Rotten Tomatoes, 18% of 11 critics' reviews are positive, with an average rating of 3.2/10. On Metacritic it has a score of 25 out of 100 based on reviews from 9 critics, which indicates "generally unfavorable" reviews.

Variety commented that, "V.C. Andrews' novel of incestuous relationships and confined childhood always has been a superb candidate for a film treatment, but director Jeffrey Bloom has taken narrative and squeezed the life from it. Performances are as stiff and dreary as the attic these children are imprisoned in." Richard Harrington of The Washington Post said, "it is slow, stiff, stupid and senseless, a film utterly lacking in motivation, development, and nuance, and further marred by embarrassingly flat acting and directing." TV Guide rated the film at one out of four stars, stating that "the film version of Andrews' novel is incredibly tame and downright boring." Time Out London wrote that "as fantasy stripped of all the metaphorical trimmings, the sublimely ridiculous plot is more likely to reduce an audience to laughter than to tears."

Recent reviews have been slightly more mixed. A review published in 2012 on the website Basement Rejects gave the film four and a half stars out of ten, and stated, "Flowers in the Attic is in the so-bad-its-good category. It teeters on the edge of just bad, but it has a bit of a kitschy feel." A March 2018 review for the website Cinema's Fringes on the upcoming Arrow Films Blu-ray release was somewhat more favorable, and while critical of the acting, mentioned that, "Flowers in the Attic is a film with lots of issues but it's still diverting as a piece of 1980s nostalgia". The film received a positive review on the Cinematic Addiction website, where it was praised for its acting, direction and music. The review specified, "Flowers in the Attic is a good movie. It's certainly not a film for everyone − it deals with some very disturbing themes − but it is an effective movie."

=== Accolades ===
Kristy Swanson won a Young Artist Award for Best Young Actress in a Horror or Mystery Motion Picture in 1989 for her portrayal of Cathy Dollanganger, while in 1988, Louise Fletcher was nominated for a Saturn Award for Best Supporting Actress for her performance as the Grandmother.

=== Home media ===
In the United States, the film was released on VHS on April 5, 1988 by Starmaker Entertainment. Anchor Bay Entertainment later acquired home distribution rights and released the film on video on October 3, 1997. This was followed by a DVD from Anchor Bay on April 10, 2001, which contained a newly remastered version presented in its original aspect ratio of 1.85:1, the original Mono audio track in Dolby Digital, and the theatrical trailer. Image Entertainment released the film on DVD as part of their "Midnight Madness Series" on September 20, 2011. Image Entertainment released the film for the first time on Blu-ray in the U.S. on September 9, 2014.

In the United Kingdom, the film received a VHS release from Cinema Club on January 26, 2000. It was made available on DVD three times, first from Cinema Club on June 7, 2004, then from Anchor Bay Entertainment on February 21, 2005, and from budget distribution company Boulevard Entertainment. Flowers in the Attic received its Blu-ray release in the UK on March 12, 2018 via Arrow Films in the most definitive version to date; the special edition set contains the original aspect ratio of 1.85:1, an LCPM 2.0 English audio track, English SDH subtitles, and numerous specials, including, cast and crew interviews, audio commentaries, the original ending, original theatrical trailer and more. The set also contains original and newly commissioned cover artwork, and a collectible booklet available only in first printing.

== Related works ==
=== Potential sequel ===
According to Kristy Swanson, a sequel to the film adaptation based on the novel's sequel, Petals on the Wind, was planned, but never reached production. Once again, Fries Entertainment was going to produce, and the script was written by Mark David Perry. The film would be based on the same plotline of the sequel novel, with the exception of the lack of Corinne Foxworth's character since she was killed off in the original film.

Swanson agreed to play the part one more time, but was never contacted again about the film after she was sent the script; "I was sent a script of Petals on the Wind and it never took off ... I remember running into Louise Fletcher in Santa Barbara about four years ago. She asked me if I had gotten the Petals on the Wind script, which I had, and she wanted to know if I had read it. I told her I had and that they had called me about it. I was interested but then I didn't hear from them anymore. And apparently the same thing happened with her. It's like they wanted to do it but they couldn't get it off the ground ... When I read the script, I wasn't too thrilled with it. I know Cathy goes through a lot in the next book, and the script was a real "sexfest." She gets pregnant and has so many affairs. There's her brother, Christopher, and then she has an affair with Julian, the dancer, and there's Paul, the doctor. I was actually kind of wondering if I should even do a sequel, you know? I just didn't know if it should be done."

=== Other adaptations ===
Another adaptation of Flowers in the Attic aired on the Lifetime network on January 18, 2014, starring Heather Graham as Corrine, Academy Award-winner Ellen Burstyn as Olivia, and Kiernan Shipka and Mason Dye as Cathy and Christopher. Producer Meredith Finn stated that the remake of the film remained much more true to the book than its predecessor, with the controversial incest storyline remaining intact.

Subsequently, a television film sequel based on the next book of the series, Petals on the Wind, premiered on the Lifetime network on May 26, 2014. Unlike the book, the film jumped ten years ahead from the events of Flowers. It starred Rose McIver as Cathy and Wyatt Nash as Christopher, replacing Kiernan Shipka and Mason Dye from the previous film, respectively, and Will Kemp as Julian Marquet, and Heather Graham as Corrine and Ellen Burstyn as Olivia Foxworth, the latter two reprising their roles. Production for the film began on February 25, 2014, in Los Angeles.

Two more television film sequels, If There Be Thorns and Seeds of Yesterday, both aired in 2015.

== See also ==
- Psycho-biddy
