= Flowers in the Attic (disambiguation) =

Flowers in the Attic is a 1979 novel by V.C. Andrews

Flowers in the Attic may also refer to:

- Flowers in the Attic (1987 film), a 1987 film based on the 1979 novel
- Flowers in the Attic (2014 film), a 2014 made-for-television film of the 1979 novel
