= Jason Lewis (actor) =

American actor and former model

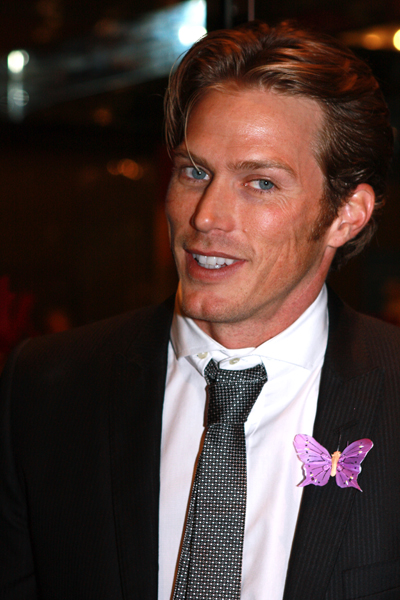
- Lewis in 2007
- Born: June 25, 1971 (age 55); Newport Beach, California, U.S.
- Occupations: Actor; Model
- Years active: 1994–present
- Parents: Gregory Lewis; Nancy Lewis

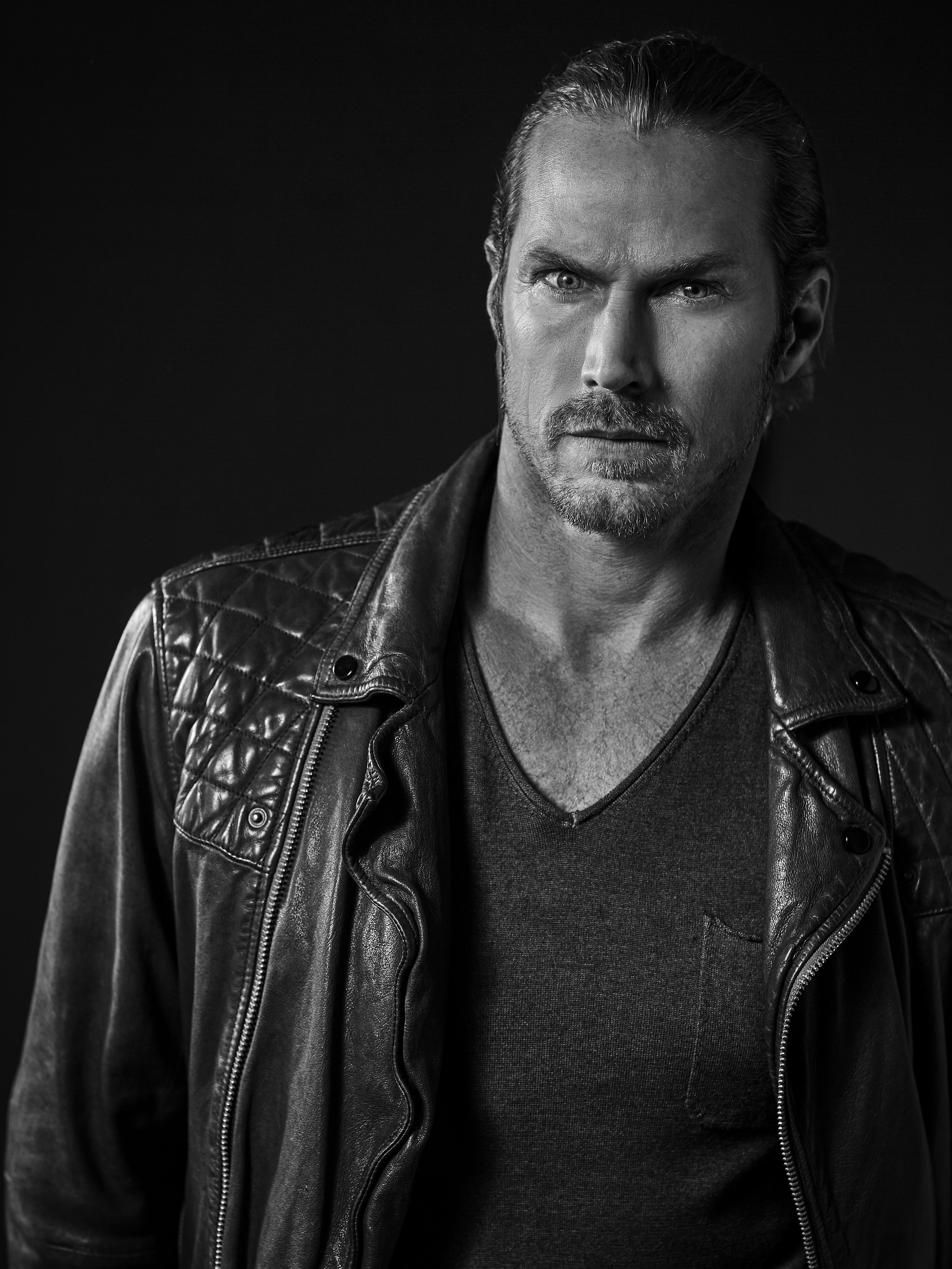
Lewis in 2018

Jason Lewis (born June 25, 1971) is an American actor and former fashion model best known as Jerry "Smith" Jerrod on Sex and the City (2003–04), Sex and the City (2008) and Sex and the City 2 (2010).

== Early life ==
Lewis was born in Newport Beach, California, to Nancy, a nurse, and Gregory Lewis, a judge; his parents are divorced. He has three siblings, Sean, Katie and Nicole. He grew up in Los Alamitos, California, and graduated from Los Alamitos High School. He attended college at San Diego State University. After college he started modeling, first in Paris and then with star status in Milan in the late 1990s for Guess?, Tommy Hilfiger and Hugo Boss, among others.

== Career ==
In 1995, Lewis made his acting debut as a regular on High Sierra Search and Rescue. He appeared on Beverly Hills, 90210 in 1997, playing Rob Andrews, a love interest of character Valerie (Tiffani-Amber Thiessen). His most prominent role to date was on Sex and the City, where he was a recurring member of the show's cast in its final season as waiter turned emerging young actor Jerry "Smith" Jerrod, the one man whose sincerity got to Samantha. He reprised the role in 2008's Sex and the City: The Movie and its 2010 sequel.

Lewis has appeared in several films: My Bollywood Bride, a Hollywood/Bollywood romantic comedy where Lewis plays the leading man opposite Bollywood actress Kashmera Shah, and Mr. Brooks, a thriller, where he plays opposite Demi Moore and Kevin Costner. He is also known in Europe for playing the hunk on the Aero Advert for Aero Bubbles.

After appearing on The WB's supernatural drama Charmed, where he played the recurring role of Dex Lawson, a love interest (and brief husband) of Phoebe Halliwell (Alyssa Milano), it was announced on December 5, 2006, that he would guest-star on episodes of Brothers & Sisters as a possible love interest to Matthew Rhys' character Kevin Walker. He signed on to do seven episodes to play Chad Barry, a closeted gay soap opera actor who finds it difficult trying to develop a relationship with Kevin while keeping his sexuality secret from the Hollywood press. He reprised the role in an episode in April 2009. He also played a soap opera actor on two episodes of House. Lewis appears and is highlighted on the cover in the limited-edition coffee table book About Face, shot by celebrity photographer John Russo and published by Pixie Press Worldwide.

Lewis is a supporter of the LGBT community. On May 10, 2008, he attended the 19th GLAAD Media Awards, a ceremony that celebrates gay-friendly actors and actresses as well as media outlets.

Lewis appeared in the How I Met Your Mother episode "The Wedding Bride" as a star in a fictional film within the show. He starred in the 2011 Canadian film Textuality. In addition, he appeared as Pete in the Israeli television show, Be With Her. He starred as Christopher Dollanganger in If There Be Thorns and Seeds of Yesterday, the third and fourth films of the Flowers in the Attic TV film series based on the Dollanganger novel series by V.C. Andrews.

On September 8, 2022, Lewis was announced as a contestant on season 31 of Dancing with the Stars. He was partnered with Peta Murgatroyd. They were eliminated during week 1, finishing in last place.

== Personal life ==
On 14 February 2020, Lewis announced his engagement to producer Liz Godwin.

== Filmography ==
=== Films ===
Year	Title	Role	Notes
1998	Next Stop Wonderland	Rory	
1999	Kimberly	Scott	
2000	The King's Guard	William	
2001	The Elite	Jason	
2004	The Vision	Blake	Short film
2005	The Jacket	Officer Harrison	
2006	For One Night	Mark Manning	Television film
2006	My Bollywood Bride	Alex Kincade	
2007	Lucifer	Lucifer	Short film
2007	Mr. Brooks	Jesse Vialo	
2007	The Death and Life of Bobby Z	Bobby Z	
2007	Deadbox	Aaron	
2008	The Attic	John Trevor	Direct-to-video
2008	Sex and the City	Jerry "Smith" Jerrod	
2009	Tribute	Ford Sawyer	Television film
2009	So che ritornerai	Tom	Television film
2010	Sex and the City 2	Smith Jerrod	
2011	Textuality	Breslin	
2013	The Pardon	Cowboy	
2017	Running Wild	Brannon Bratt	
2017	Palm Swings	Lance	
2018	Half Magic	Mark	

=== Television ===
Year	Title	Role	Notes
1995	High Sierra Search and Rescue	Flynn Norstedt	6 episodes
1997	Beverly Hills, 90210	Rob Andrews	4 episodes
2003–04	Sex and the City	Jerry "Smith" Jerrod	16 episodes
2003	CSI: Miami	Jimmy Hutton	Episode: "Grand Prix"
2005	Charmed	Dex Lawson	6 episodes
2006	The Evidence	Inspector Rourke/Officer Rourke	2 episodes
2007, 2009	Brothers & Sisters	Chad Barry	8 episodes
2007	Six Degrees	Todd	Episode: "Get a Room"
2008	House	Evan Greer/Dr. Brock Sterling	Episode: Living the Dream (1 other uncredited)
2008	Mogli a pezzi	Elvio Giorgi	Main cast
2008	CSI: Crime Scene Investigation	Craig Hess	Episode: "Let It Bleed"
2009	The Eastmans	Rick Green	Unsold CBS pilot
2009	Rick & Steve: The Happiest Gay Couple in All the World	Manfred Dax (voice)	Episode: "The Only Straight in the Village"
2010	How I Met Your Mother	Movie Tony	Episode: "The Wedding Bride"
2011	Love Bites	—N/a	Unaired pilot
2012	Watson & Oliver	Various	Episode #1.1
2013	Hit the Floor	Benny	Episode: "Turnover"
2014	Beauty and the Baker	Pete Evans	Episode #10, Israeli TV show
2015	If There Be Thorns	Christopher Dollanganger	Lifetime Original Movie
2015	Seeds of Yesterday	Christopher Dollanganger	Lifetime Original Movie
2017–18	Midnight, Texas	Joe Strong	Main role
2022	Dancing with the Stars	Himself	Contestant (season 31)
