= Garden of Shadows =

Novel by V. C. Andrews

- First edition cover
- Author: V. C. Andrews
- Language: English
- Series: Dollanganger series
- Genre: Gothic horror Family saga
- Publisher: Simon & Schuster
- Publication date: 1987
- Publication place: United States
- Media type: Print
- Pages: 384
- ISBN: 0-671-72942-X (1990 reissue)
- OCLC: 28578527
- Preceded by: Seeds of Yesterday (1984)

Garden of Shadows, a novel by V. C. Andrews, was first published in 1987 following her death in 1986 and her estate commissioned ghostwriter Andrew Neiderman to continue writing novels under her name developed from plot outlines written by Andrews. There is some dispute over whether this particular novel was written in part by Andrews before she died, or whether it was written entirely by Neiderman. This is the fifth novel of the Dollanganger series. The novel explains the origin of Olivia Winfield (the grandmother in Flowers in the Attic), the events that cause her to become the cold, domineering mistress of Foxworth Hall, and Corinne's childhood and eventual betrayal. It is the fifth novel of the Flowers in the Attic series but considered the prequel, as the story told takes place prior to the events of the first book. The story covers the years between 1918 and 1957.

== Plot ==
=== Part I ===
Tall, plain Olivia Winfield is rescued from spinsterhood by the smart and handsome Malcolm Foxworth. She thinks she has found "the one," as he proposes after only two days' acquaintance and they marry two weeks later. Olivia leaves her family home in New London, Connecticut, to move to his family's mansion, Foxworth Hall, in Charlottesville, Virginia. Olivia starts to discover dark secrets about Malcolm, which eventually diminish her love for him. At a party to celebrate their wedding, Malcolm flirts with other women.

She discovers that Malcolm is still tormented by his mother Corinne's abandonment of him at age five. She believes her own plain looks and money attracted him to her, since he mistrusts conventionally beautiful women. Olivia feels betrayed and humiliated but is still optimistic that things will change as they begin their life together.

When exploring the house, she discovers the "Swan Room" which belonged to Malcolm's mother. It has been kept as a shrine to her and contains a very large, ornate bed carved in the shape of a swan. When Malcolm discovers her in the room, they finally consummate their marriage, an act that could be considered more of an attack than an act of love, with Malcolm saying his mother's name the entire time.

Nine months later, Olivia gives birth to a boy, Malcolm Jr., referred to as "Mal". Malcolm is kind to her at times, giving her hope that things might improve between them. But for the most part, Olivia feels unimportant and ignored. Two years later, she gives birth to a second son, Joel. Malcolm is upset, as Joel is not healthy and he wanted their second child to be a girl. They are also told she cannot have any more children. Malcolm does not fully appreciate his sons because of his disappointment at not having a daughter.

=== Part II ===
Shortly after Joel is born, Malcolm's father Garland comes back to Foxworth Hall with his new wife, Alicia. Olivia is disgusted that Alicia is only nineteen and very beautiful. Malcolm is enraged to discover that she is pregnant, thinking that her child will inherit part of Garland's fortune. Alicia makes numerous friendly overtures to Olivia, but Olivia keeps distant from her. Alicia gives birth to a son, whom she names Christopher.

However, Malcolm becomes obsessed with Alicia. When Alicia spurns his advances, Malcolm is convinced that she is leading him on and vows to make her pay dearly. Olivia witnesses Malcolm's lust. Humiliated and heartbroken, she blames Alicia for making herself attractive to Malcolm.

On the night of Christopher's third birthday, Garland catches Malcolm trying to rape Alicia, gets into a violent argument with him, has a heart attack, and dies. Amidst the somber air in the manor, Malcolm seems to be feeling some guilt and avoids Alicia. Eventually, though, his obsession resumes. Soon Alicia confesses to Olivia that Malcolm has been coming to her bedroom and raping her, threatening to throw her and her son out on the street penniless if she does not yield. She has become pregnant with Malcolm's child.

Olivia decides that the only thing to do is to hide Alicia away while Olivia herself feigns being with child. Once Alicia secretly delivers, Olivia will pass the baby off as hers; Malcolm will give Alicia Garland's inheritance, and she and Christopher will leave. Alicia reluctantly agrees, says goodbye to Christopher, and goes into hiding in the attic of Foxworth Hall. Olivia hires new servants as an extra precaution to safeguard their secret, but she fears that Malcolm's interest in Alicia remains. To make Alicia less attractive to him, Olivia coerces her into cutting off her long hair, which Olivia leaves on Malcolm's desk to show that she is now the one in control.

As months pass, Olivia begins to think of Christopher as another son and is heartbroken when Alicia suddenly and quietly leaves with him after the birth of a daughter. However, Olivia is soon enraged when she discovers that Malcolm has named his new child Corinne (her name is spelled "Corrine" in the V.C. Andrews-penned original novels), after his mother, and plans to oversee her upbringing. He acts like an only parent to the young Corinne, often overriding attempts by Olivia to raise her to be a proper young woman. Olivia still does what she can to be a mother to Corinne, and takes joy in their relationship.

In the years that pass, Corinne grows up into a happy but spoiled girl and Malcolm continues to be emotionally distant from his sons and wife. Mal dies in a motorcycling accident when he rides off a cliff near Foxworth Hall. Later John Amos, Olivia's cousin, is hired as butler and he incorporates religion into the household. Joel soon leaves on a tour of Europe with a professional orchestra—against his father's wishes and is praised in several European newspapers.

=== Part III ===
Joel's parents are informed of his death by avalanche in a telegram which also reveals that his body was not recovered. Devastated over the loss of their sons, Olivia and Malcolm turn to religion and bond somewhat, until Olivia receives a letter from Alicia, who is dying from breast cancer. Alicia remarried soon after leaving Foxworth Hall, but her husband died a few years later. She and Christopher have been living in poverty since becoming bankrupt during the Great Depression. Remembering Olivia's kindness to Christopher while she was in the attic, Alicia pleads with her to give Christopher a home and put him through medical school. Olivia convinces Malcolm to agree to this.

When they meet for the first time, Corinne and Christopher fall deeply in love. It goes unnoticed by the household, however, because they all adore Christopher. Later John Amos begins to suspect incest, although Olivia brushes it off as his jealousy. She and Malcolm seem truly happy and content with their family for the first time.

After Christopher graduates from college and Corinne has finished high school, a letter of acceptance arrives from Harvard. Olivia is excitedly searching to tell Christopher when John Amos reports that Christopher and Corinne are making love in the Swan Room. She does not believe him, but a quick peek shows it is true. Olivia is heartbroken and tells Malcolm. Christopher and Corinne try to explain themselves, but Malcolm condemns them and Olivia sides with him instead of intervening. They are banished and disinherited.

Malcolm has a stroke followed by a heart attack, and he is forced to use a wheelchair. Olivia devotes herself to his care. Olivia reveals to John Amos that Christopher was not just Corinne's half-uncle, but also her half-brother. She tells of the sins and the events that led to them. John preys on Olivia's fear of God, urging her and Malcolm to become obsessively religious.

Malcolm is a changed man after the scandal. Finally he breaks, and asks Olivia to hire a private detective to find out what happened to Corinne. The P.I. returns and informs Olivia that they live in Gladstone, Pennsylvania (outside of Philadelphia), under the name of Dollanganger. Christopher has dropped out of medical school and works in public relations, while Corinne is a housewife. They live a typical suburban, middle-class life with four children: Chris, Cathy, and twins Cory and Carrie. All four children are perfectly healthy, bright, and beautiful, known in their town as the Dresden Dolls. Olivia does not tell Malcolm about the children because she believes that he will want to see his grandchildren and become bewitched by their beauty, especially the girls.

Years later, Corinne writes to tell of Christopher's death in a car accident and to seek shelter. Olivia is heartbroken over Christopher's death, but John Amos tells her that it was God's work. He also convinces her to allow Corinne and the children to come. But the children must be hidden from the world forever, if she wants to end the sins within Foxworth Hall. Olivia tells Malcolm that Corinne is coming home, still not mentioning the children's existence.

When she first sees them, Chris and Cathy remind Olivia so much of Christopher and Corinne. But she refuses to love them; as products of incest, they are "the devil's spawn". The book ends with Olivia silently vowing to keep her heart hardened against the children and to keep them forever hidden from the world—while feeling just as imprisoned as they will soon be.

== Clarifications ==
This book, though a prequel, actually changes the entire scandalous nature of the series. As well as being half-uncle and niece, it is revealed Chris and Corinne were three-quarter brother and sister as they shared the same mother but their fathers were father and son, making them more closely related than half siblings but less than full siblings. The book also gives a sympathetic side to Olivia previously unseen in the other books. However, Olivia's softer side was implied in Flowers in the Attic, when Cathy theorizes at one point, though briefly, that Olivia was trying to prevent them from eating the poisoned donuts their mother sets out for them, when Olivia agrees with Cathy's demands that the dying twin Cory be taken to a hospital (but he really wasn't), when Olivia gives them a plant, and when Christopher witnesses Olivia in prayer at the foot of her bed.

This book also clarifies the suspicious marriage of Corinne and John Amos (mentioned in If There Be Thorns), considering the latter's obvious disgust with incest. As Corinne is not Olivia's biological daughter, she and John Amos are not genetically related.

Also, this book examines Corinne's betrayal. It has stated in this book that she wanted to marry and have children, but her greedy side is shown in the other books, such as in If There Be Thorns, when Christopher states that Corinne wanted him to sue and get the money that was his. Her betrayal is likely due to the fact that she was spoiled by her father and grew up in wealth, so once the children were in the attic, she turned her attention toward getting her inheritance. Corinne conspired with Olivia to lock her children away and said (about waking the twins so they could walk, as Chris and Cathy were complaining about their arms aching from holding them), "Lord knows, they'd better walk outside while they can." Corinne claims in Petals On the Wind that she did put arsenic on the doughnuts, but her plan was not to kill them—it was to get the children sick one by one and take them out of the attic "to the hospital," then come back and tell Olivia that they had died. However, this claim seems doubtful, as Corinne and her husband Bart moved out of Foxworth Hall after Cory died, and she did not seem concerned with helping the remaining three children escape.

== Characters introduced ==
- Alicia Foxworth: Garland's second wife, stepmother to Malcolm, and mother of Christopher and Corinne. When first introduced, she was nineteen and pregnant. Malcolm believes she is with his father only because of his money but Alicia is truly in love with Garland. She is later raped by Malcolm and Olivia locked her in the same attic the Dollanganger children were locked in while she was pregnant with Corinne. She later dies of breast cancer.
- Garland Foxworth: Father of Malcolm and Christopher, the paternal grandfather of Corinne, and husband of Alicia. He is a kind and likable man but somewhat dismissive towards problem child Malcolm while giving more attention to perfect child Christopher. He dies of a heart attack on Christopher's third birthday, after fighting with his son Malcolm over Alicia.
- Malcolm "Mal" Neal Foxworth, Jr.: Older brother of Joel, nephew of Christopher, and paternal half-brother of Corinne. He was usually referred to as "Mal" so he could be told apart from his father. He dies in a motorcycling accident. He was mentioned by Corinne in Flowers in the Attic.
- Joel Joseph Foxworth: Younger brother of Mal. He is treated with disdain by his father, who considers him a "sissy." Joel is a talented musician and later joins an orchestra. Joel is presumed dead in an avalanche and his body was never found. A man claiming he is Joel Foxworth appears in Seeds of Yesterday but he behaves like John Amos Jackson. (He may have been a fraud and the cousin that John predicted in If There Be Thorns would stand behind him).

== Adaptation ==
Lifetime adapted the novel as Flowers in the Attic: The Origin as a four-part miniseries. It premiered on July 9, 2022. and concluded on July 30, 2022. Starring Jemima Rooper as Olivia and Max Irons as Malcolm. Supporting cast includes Kelsey Grammer, Harry Hamlin, Kate Mulgrew, Paul Wesley, T’Shan Williams, Hannah Dodd, and Alana Boden.
