= Trick 'r Treat (soundtrack) =

2009 film soundtrack album

Trick 'r Treat (Original Motion Picture Score)

Film score by Douglas Pipes
- Released: September 29, 2009
- Recorded: July 2007
- Studios: Eastwood Scoring Stage, Warner Bros. Studios, Burbank, California
- Genre: Film score
- Length: 59:09
- Label: La-La Land Records
- Producer: Douglas Pipes

Douglas Pipes chronology
Monster House (2006)	Trick 'r Treat (2009)	Bad Blood Days (2010)

Trick 'r Treat (Original Motion Picture Score) is the soundtrack album to the 2009 film Trick 'r Treat directed by Michael Dougherty. The album contained the film score composed by Douglas Pipes, which was recorded at the Warner Bros. Eastwood Scoring Stage. The album was released in CDs through La-La Land Records on September 29, 2009. A vinyl edition was published by Waxwork Records in double LPs in October 2014.

== Background ==
The original score is composed by Douglas Pipes. Dougherty listened to his score for Monster House (2006) and liked the eerie atmospheric setting which led to his involvement in the project. The score was recorded at the Warner Bros. Eastwood Scoring Stage in July 2007. Pipes composed a children's playground sing-sing like melody for the main themes which had a darker twist by the orchestra. As the film was primarily a horror score, the music utilized a lot of creepy elements including solo cello, low piano, scary percussion effects and breathing sounds, as well as a choir and a limited use of electronics. The 65-piece orchestra was conducted by Bruce Babcock who also orchestrated it with Jim Honeyman and Jon Kull, the lead orchestrator. The 60-minute score was recorded within two days. It was recorded and mixed by Brad Haehnel who used a tight close-miked sounds to hear the nuances in the orchestral performance. Dougherty was present in the sessions providing feedback to Pipes regarding the cues, where any minor tweaks or adjustments would be made.

== Release ==
The soundtrack was released in CDs through La-La Land Records on September 29, 2009. A vinyl edition of the album was published by Waxwork Records which released it on October 2014. The album featured additional tracks from the score being compiled into double album.

== Reception ==
Jonathan Broxton of Movie Music UK wrote "With Trick 'r Treat, and with Monster House before it, [Pipes] is proving to be one of the most exciting American composers to emerge in years, with the orchestral knowledge and the theme-writing prowess to compete with the best. Despite the delay, Trick 'r Treat was definitely worth the wait – it's another contender for 2009's score of the year honors." Scott A. Johnson of Dread Central wrote "With the grace of [John] Williams and the emotional intensity of Danny Elfman, this soundtrack hits a home run." Thomas Glorieux of Maintitles wrote "Like Monster House, Trick 'r Treat is a strong album from Douglas Pipes, leaving behind the impression that horror might be his niche after all."

William Ruhlmann of AllMusic wrote "far more ambitious than one might expect for a picture that isn't even being given a theatrical run, but it demonstrates the composer's talent and will add to the enjoyment of horror fans who seek the film out in its digital, home video, and television distribution." Paige F. MacGregor of Fandomania wrote "From the piano in "It's Halloween, Not Hanukkah" to the chorals in "The Halloween Schoolbus Massacre" and the screeching strings of "Main Titles," the first track on the disc, Trick 'r Treat delivers time and again."

Scorekeeper of Ain't It Cool News listed it one of the best film scores of 2009, writing "Pipes' score for Trick 'r Treat is the perfect consequent phrase to the antecedence of Monster House. The later of the two masterworks casts an impressive net over Halloween and manages to snare a comprehensive cornucopia of colors, tones, sights, emotions, and flavors embodying and emboldening the very nucleus of Halloween [...] this is one of the many facets of Pipes' masterful scoring skills which separates him from the humdrum Hollywood rank-and-file."

Meagan Navarro of Bloody Disgusting listed it as one of the best horror film scores, and wrote: "Composer Douglas Pipes somehow manages to blend clever nostalgia of horror classics like Psycho with thematic Halloween melodies. He also balances the playful whimsy of the holiday with malicious, biting humor. In other words, it's a perfect theme (and score) for this epic holiday horror comedy." Joseph Morpugo of Fact listed it at one of the best horror film scores, adding "Pipes' most celebrated work remains 2006's kid's flick Monster House, but Trick 'R Treat shows his music isn't just for nippers and softies."

== Track listing ==
=== Standard edition ===
No.	Title	Length
1.	"Main Titles"	2:20
2.	"Meet Charlie"	0:45
3.	"It's Halloween, Not Hanukkah"	3:12
4.	"Charlie Bites It"	1:42
5.	"Father And Son"	6:18
6.	"Meet Rhonda"	1:33
7.	"To The Quarry"	1:42
8.	"The Halloween Schoolbus Massacre"	4:55
9.	"The Elevator / Laurie On The Prowl"	2:02
10.	"Halloween Prank"	4:25
11.	"Not A Trick / Red And Black"	3:51
12.	"Laurie's First Time"	2:48
13.	"Old Mr. Kreeg"	1:52
14.	"Pumpkin Shooter / Meet Sam"	12:03
15.	"The Bus Driver"	0:39
16.	"The Neighborhood"	1:51
17.	"Trick 'r Treat"	0:30
18.	"End Credits"	6:41
Total length:		59:09

=== Vinyl edition ===
No.	Title	Length
1.	"Spooky Guidelines"
2.	"It's Halloween, Not Hanukkah / Main Title"
3.	"Meet Charlie"
4.	"Charlie Bites It"
5.	"Father and Son"
6.	"Meet Rhonda"
7.	"To the Quarry"
8.	"The Halloween Schoolbus Massacre"
9.	"The Elevator / Laurie On The Prowl"
10.	"Halloween Prank"
11.	"Not a Trick / Red and Black"
12.	"Laurie's First Time"
13.	"Old Mr. Kreeg"
14.	"Pumpkin Shooter / Meet Sam"
15.	"The Bus Driver"
16.	"The Neighborhood"
17.	"Trick 'r Treat"
18.	"End Credits"
19.	"Emma"
20.	"Always Check Your Candy"
21.	"Wilkins' Backyard"
22.	"Rock Quarry"
23.	"Sheep's Meadow"
24.	"Old Mr. Kreeg's House"

== Personnel ==
Credits adapted from liner notes:

- Music composer and producer – Douglas Pipes
- Pro-tools recordist – Kevin Globerman
- Auricle operator – Richard Grant
- Recording and mixing – Brad Haehnel
- Mastering – Patricia Sullivan Fourstar
- Score editor – Oliver Hug
- Music consultant – Margaret Yen, Peter Afterman
- Musical assistance – John Wood
- Executive producer – MV Gerhard, Matt Verboys
- Copyist – Mark Graham
- Liner notes – Michael Dougherty
- Art direction – David C. Fein
- Music business and legal affairs – Keith Zajic, Lori Blackstone
- Executive in charge of music for Warner Bros. Pictures – Carter Armstrong, Doug Frank

Orchestra

- Conductor – Bruce Babcock
- Lead orchestrator – Jon Kull
- Additional orchestrator – Bruce Babcock, Jim Honeyman
- Orchestra contractor – Decrescent And Rotter Music Contracting, Peter Rotter

Choir

- Choir contractor – Sally Stevens
- Voice – Aidan Pipes, Ann White, Dallas Wells, Debbie Hall Gleason, Fletcher Sheridan, Hannah Pipes, Luana Jackman Waimey, Sally Stevens, Sandie Hall, Teri Koide, Walt Harrah

Instruments

- Bass – Bruce Morgenthaler, Michael Valerio, Nico Abondolo, Nicolas Philippon, Steve Edelman, Susan Ranney
- Bassoon – Michael R. O'Donovan
- Cello – Andrew Shulman, Antony Cooke, Armen Ksajikian, Cecilia Tsan, Christine Ermacoff, David Speltz, Eri Duke-Kirkpatrick, George Kim Scholes, John Walz, Steve Erdody
- Clarinet – Donald Foster, James M. Kanter, Ralph Williams, Steven Roberts
- Flute – David Shostac, Geraldine Rotella, Heather Clark
- Guitar – Jason Foster
- Horn – Brian O'Connor, David Duke, James W. Thatcher, Kristy Morrell, Phillip Edward Yao
- Oboe – Phillip Ayling
- Percussion – Alan Estes, Gregory Goodall, Peter Limonick
- Piano – Gloria Cheng
- Trombone – Andrew Malloy, George Thatcher, William Booth
- Trumpet – Jon Lewis, Malcolm McNab
- Tuba – Doug Tornquist
- Viola – Brian Dembow, Darrin McCann, David Walther, Jennie Hansen, Kathryn Reddish, Keith Greene, Marlow Fisher, Piotr T. Jandula, Rick Gerding, Robert Berg, Samuel W. Formicola, Shanti D. Randall, Steven Gordon
- Violin – Agnes Gottschewski, Alyssa Park, Ana Landauer, Anatoly Rosinsky, Armen Garabedian, Cynthia L. Moussas, Daniel Lewin, Endre Granat, Eric J. Hosler, Galina Golovin, Irina Voloshina, Jay Rosen, Joel M. Pargman, Josefina Vergara, Julie Ann Gigante, Katia Popov, Kevin Connolly, Lisa M. Sutton, Lorenz Gamma, Marina Manukian, Nancy K. Roth, Natalie Leggett, Neil E. Samples, Nina Evtuhov, Rafael Rishik, Richard Altenbach, Roberto Cani, Roger Wilkie, Sharon Jackson, Sungil Lee, Tereza Stanislav

== Accolades ==
Award	Category	Recipient(s) and nominee(s)	Result	Ref.
International Film Music Critics Association	Best Original Score for a Horror/Thriller Film	Douglas Pipes	Nominated	
