= Rachael Carpani =

Australian actress (1980–2025)

- Born: Rachael Anna-Maie Carpani; 24 August 1980; Sydney, New South Wales, Australia
- Died: 7 December 2025 (aged 45); Sydney, New South Wales, Australia
- Occupation: Actress
- Years active: 2000–2025
- Partner: Matt Passmore (2006–2011)

Rachael Anna-Maie Carpani (24 August 1980 – 7 December 2025) was an Australian actress best known for her role as Jodi Fountain-McLeod in McLeod's Daughters.

== Career ==
Carpani is most famous for her role as Jodi Fountain on the Australian television drama McLeod's Daughters. Carpani also had a role in the film Hating Alison Ashley, starring Delta Goodrem, and appeared in All Saints. Carpani and Goodrem had both attended The Hills Grammar School.

She left McLeod's Daughters to pursue her career in the United States. She had been cast in the CBS pilot, Law Dogs with Janeane Garofalo, but the series was not picked up. She appeared in seven episodes of season one of Cane. Carpani returned to McLeod's Daughters as Jodi Fountain for the final episode on 31 January 2009.

Carpani appeared commercially as one of the faces for Telstra's Next G network. She appeared in episode six of NCIS: Los Angeles in November 2009, playing a small role alongside Chris O'Donnell and LL Cool J. In 2010, she had a recurring role on The Glades, playing opposite former real-life boyfriend Matt Passmore. She began starring in the crime drama Against the Wall in 2011. In 2015, Carpani starred in the TV films If There Be Thorns and Seeds of Yesterday on the Lifetime cable network, which are the third and fourth films in the Flowers in the Attic TV film series that are based on the Dollanganger novel series by V.C. Andrews. In 2018, she appeared in a multi-episode arc in the Seven/South Pacific series 800 Words.

In August 2024, Carpani joined the recurring cast of Home and Away as Claudia Salini.

== Personal life ==
Carpani dated Matt Passmore, a fellow actor. After her death, he paid tribute to her.

Carpani spoke openly on her struggle with Endometriosis, the condition she lived with for twenty years. She opened a dialogue about living with the condition and how it affected her life and her time on set.

== Death ==
Carpani died from a chronic illness in Sydney, Australia, on 7 December 2025, at the age of 45.

Leading a tribute was her McLeod's Daughters co-star Bridie Carter, who shared on social media "Rest in Peace our beautiful girl." Matt Passmore in his tribute said "the greatest gift was knowing you."

=== Funeral ===
Her funeral was held on 19 December 2025 took place in Sydney, Australia.

== Filmography ==
=== Film ===
Year	Title	Role	Notes
2005	Hating Alison Ashley	Valjoy Yurken	
2009	Triangle	Sally	
2016	The Umbrella Man	Annie Brennan	
2020	The Way Back	Diane	
2020	The Very Excellent Mr. Dundee	Angie	
2022	Beat	Susan	
2026	Spa Weekend	Isla	Posthumous release

=== Television ===
Year	Title	Role	Notes
2001	All Saints	Emily Martin	Episode: "Too Little Too Late"
2001	Home and Away	Miranda	Season 14, episodes 87 & 88
2001	Ihaka: Blunt Instrument	Tara	TV movie
2001–2009	McLeod's Daughters	Jodi Fountain-McLeod	Season 1–7 (main), Season 8 (guest); 179 episodes
2007	Law Dogs	Carly Owen	TV movie
2007	Cane	Terry Greenway	5 episodes
2008	Scorched	Susan Shapiro	TV movie
2009	NCIS: Los Angeles	Amy	Episode: "Keepin' It Real"
2010	True Blue	Tess Flynn	TV movie
2010	The Glades	Heather Thompson	3 episodes
2011	Against the Wall	Abby Kowalski	13 episodes
2014	Stalker		1 episode
2014	Touched	Emma	TV movie
2015	If There Be Thorns	Cathy Dollanganger	TV movie
2015	Seeds of Yesterday	Cathy Dollanganger	TV movie
2017	The Rachels	Sami	TV movie
2017	800 Words	Mary	2 episodes
2024	Home and Away	Claudia Salini	Season 37 (10 episodes)

== Awards ==
Carpani was nominated for several television awards in her career. For her role on McLeod's Daughters, she was nominated at the 2007 Logies for a Gold Logie and Most Popular Actress award.
