= Half Magic (film) =

2018 American comedy film by Heather Graham

- Theatrical release poster
- Directed by: Heather Graham
- Written by: Heather Graham
- Produced by: Sid Sheinberg; Jon Sheinberg; Bill Sheinberg
- Starring: Heather Graham; Angela Kinsey; Stephanie Beatriz; Thomas Lennon; Luke Arnold; Jason Lewis; Alex Beh; Michael Aronov; Molly Shannon; Rhea Perlman; Chris D'Elia
- Cinematography: Pedro Gómez Millán
- Edited by: Morgan Neville
- Music by: Alex Wurman
- Production company: The Bubble Factory
- Distributed by: Momentum Pictures
- Release date: February 23, 2018
- Running time: 100 minutes
- Country: United States
- Language: English

Half Magic is a 2018 American comedy film written and directed by Heather Graham in her directorial debut. The film stars Graham, Angela Kinsey, Stephanie Beatriz, Thomas Lennon, Luke Arnold, Jason Lewis, Alex Beh, Michael Aronov, Molly Shannon, Rhea Perlman and Chris D'Elia. The film was released in theaters and through video on demand on February 23, 2018, by Momentum Pictures.

== Plot ==
Three women meet each other at a “Divine Feminine" workshop. Honey is a screenwriter who has a casual relationship with Peter, an arrogant action film star who makes misogynistic comments. Eva, a dress designer, is a divorcée whose ex-husband left her for a college student. Free-spirited Candy is in a relationship with Daniel, a TED Talks enthusiast who refuses to be exclusive with her. The three women bond over their shared frustrations and make a pact to date “good guys only” and improve their love lives.

== Cast ==
- Heather Graham as Honey
- Angela Kinsey as Eva
- Stephanie Beatriz as Candy
- Thomas Lennon as Darren
- Luke Arnold as Freedom
- Jason Lewis as Mark
- Alex Beh as Daniel
- Chelsea Mark as Chandra
- Michael Aronov as John
- Molly Shannon as Valesca
- Rhea Perlman as Linda
- Chris D'Elia as Peter
- Johnny Knoxville as Father Gary

== Production ==
On June 4, 2015, Angela Kinsey, Chris D'Elia, Jason Lewis and Molly Shannon joined the cast of the film. Principal photography began on June 4, 2015.

== Release ==
The film was released in theaters and through video on demand on February 23, 2018, by Momentum Pictures.

== Reception ==
On Rotten Tomatoes, it has a 62% approval rating based on 34 reviews, with the consensus: "Half Magic never quite fulfills its apparent goals, but this comedy from writer-director-star Heather Graham is still occasionally affably diverting." On Metacritic, the film has a weighted average score of 49 out of 100, based on 9 critics, indicating "mixed or average" reviews.

Frank Scheck of The Hollywood Reporter wrote, "Half Magic is a lighthearted ode to female empowerment, and its theatrical release feels perfectly timed to the MeToo movement. While the pic proves too frivolous to make its satirical and social points fully register, it offers diverting pleasures along the way...due to the talents of its appealing female leads, who score consistent laughs, and the well-earned authenticity that Graham brings to the milieu.”

Writing for Variety, Amy Nicholson wrote "Graham’s dialogue is a master class in macho mind-warping where creeps use the language of female empowerment to get what they want.” Nicholson added "Graham’s passion is sincere, even if her tone and rushed pace — the byproduct of cramming in every idea in case she doesn’t get a second chance — teeters on sitcom.”

Wes Greene of Slant Magazine observed, "Through its depiction of the humorous sexual misadventures that Honey, Eva, and Candy endure, Half Magic gets at how any new lifestyle change is accompanied by a period of insecurity and self-doubt", and that "this is a film that understands that not all female desire is the same."

Susan Wloszczyna of RogerEbert.com criticized the film's script as dated and wrote, "'Half Magic' is a stumble backward in its cartoony portrait of modern-day womanhood. But I must give props to Kinsey, whose comic timing, amusing self-deprecation and grounded likability allows her to be the only cast member to come close to resembling an actual human being."
