= Petals on the Wind (film) =

2014 American film

- Genre: Drama; Romance; Thriller
- Based on: Petals on the Wind by V. C. Andrews
- Screenplay by: Kayla Alpert
- Directed by: Karen Moncrieff
- Starring: Heather Graham; Rose McIver; Wyatt Nash; Bailey Buntain; Nick Searcy; Dylan Bruce; Will Kemp; Whitney Hoy; Ellia English; Ellen Burstyn
- Theme music composer: Mario Grigorov
- Country of origin: United States
- Original language: English

Production
- Executive producers: Lisa Hamilton Daly; Merideth Finn; Charles W. Fries; Tanya Lopez; Rob Sharenow; Michele Weiss
- Producers: Richard D. Arredondo; Kyle A. Clark; Laurence Ducceschi (co producer); Lina Wong
- Cinematography: Anastas N. Michos
- Editor: Mark Stevens
- Running time: 85 minutes
- Production companies: A+E Studios; Cue the Dog Productions; Fries Film Company, Inc.; Silver Screen Pictures

Original release
- Network: Lifetime
- Release: May 26, 2014

Related
- Flowers in the Attic; If There Be Thorns

Petals on the Wind is a 2014 Lifetime movie sequel to the 2014 adaptation Flowers in the Attic, starring Heather Graham, Rose McIver, Wyatt Nash, Bailey Buntain and Ellen Burstyn. It is based on V. C. Andrews' 1980 novel of the same name, the second novel on the Dollanganger series. The film follows the surviving Dollanganger children—Cathy, Chris and Carrie—ten years after escaping the attic. Despite attempting to move on with their lives, after multiple failed attempts and tragedies occur, Cathy decides it is time to take revenge on her mother.

Lifetime first announced the film shortly before Flowers in the Attic was released. The network announced on the premiere of the movie the developing of the following books of the Dollanganger series, If There Be Thorns and Seeds of Yesterday, both of which aired in 2015.

The film received a positive response from critics.

== Plot ==
Ten years after escaping from Foxworth Hall, the surviving Dollanganger children—Cathy, Chris, and Carrie—attend the funeral of their adoptive father, Paul Sheffield, who took them in. They are still traumatized by their grandmother's abuse and their mother's betrayal, which led to the death of Carrie's twin, Cory. Meanwhile, their grandmother, Olivia, is disabled after having suffered a stroke a couple of years prior. Corrine has avoided all contact with her children and begins to renovate Foxworth Hall so she can take full ownership of the mansion.

Cathy has become an aspiring ballet dancer, Chris is in medical school, and Carrie is enrolled in an elite high school, but is constantly bullied for her small size. Cathy meets and is attracted to Julian Marquet, a fellow dancer. On their first date, he invites her to go to New York with him to try for a leading role in Romeo and Juliet, which she accepts. Later that night, Cathy and Chris admit that they still have feelings for each other and give in to their passion, making love. However, Cathy insists they must find others to love and live normal lives. The conversation reveals that Cathy was pregnant with Chris' child, conceived from their first sexual encounter while they were imprisoned, but miscarried. Although Chris says he can never love anyone but her, Cathy leaves for New York with Julian the next day with hopes of starting afresh with him.

Chris begins a relationship with Sarah Reeves, the daughter of his boss at the hospital where he works. Cathy's relationship with Julian quickly deteriorates as he shows a dark and abusive side. When she attempts to leave, Julian threatens to kill her and Chris. He drops her during ballet try-outs and injures her leg, ruining her chance of getting her desired role. She manages to sneak away to see Chris graduate from medical school but denies anything is wrong when he sees her black eye. Cathy returns to Julian after he shows regret for having abused her and helps her get the role of Juliet by putting broken glass in the original dancer's shoes. Cathy agrees to let Carrie stay with her and Julian to escape the relentless bullying at school. During the ballet, Chris catches Julian touching Carrie and a violent confrontation ensues. Julian drives off and Cathy goes with him. Cathy reveals she is pregnant with Julian's child, which causes an already erratically driving Julian to have an accident. Julian dies and Cathy is injured, but alive. Ten months later, after the birth of her son, Jory, Cathy opens her own ballet school.

Carrie meets and falls in love with a local minister named Alex, who proposes. Carrie is unsure about being a minister's wife, recalling their grandmother's statements of how she and her siblings are unholy abominations, but Cathy tells her to forget the past and look towards the future. Carrie encounters Corrine at a charity gathering and invites her to the wedding, but Corrine denies Carrie as her daughter. The next morning, Cathy and Chris find that Carrie has committed suicide by consuming poison-laced doughnuts (the same technique that was used to kill her twin). Cathy vows revenge on their murdering mother, despite Chris warily trying to talk her out of it. She hires Corrine's husband Bart Winslow as her attorney, under the guise of reviving the Sheffield estate, with the intent of seducing him. Bart is instantly attracted to her and they begin an affair.

Pressured by his boss, Chris proposes to Sarah and she accepts. However, the day before the wedding, Chris admits to Cathy he still loves her and does not want to marry Sarah. Cathy tells him that while she still does love him, she wants him to move on with his life, as their relationship cannot lead to anything. Despite this, the two end up sharing a passionate kiss. Sarah walks in and, horrified, ends her engagement with Chris, who is fired from his job as rumors of the incestuous relationship spread.

Chris asks Cathy to bring Jory and start a new life with him in California, where no one will know them. However, Cathy reveals that she is pregnant with Bart's child and intends to finish what she started. Chris decides to go with her to finally confront their mother and they sneak into Foxworth Hall on the day of Corrine's Christmas party. Cathy encounters her grandmother and confronts her about her religious hypocrisy and abuse towards her and her siblings. Undeterred, Olivia tells her that while she can abandon the family she will nevertheless forever be "the devil's spawn." During the party, Cathy reveals her identity and her mother's crimes to the stunned guests. Corrine initially denies everything, but Bart is suspicious and Olivia refuses to defend her. Corrine finally admits to everything, but insists she never intended to kill Cory or have the children put in the attic, defending her actions on the basis that her father would have rejected her and left all of them out of his will. Cathy then publicly reveals her pregnancy caused by Bart.

Corrine blames Olivia for forcing her to put the children in the attic. Olivia counters that the children are abominations and did not deserve to live. She gives Corrine a trunk of her old possessions, which when opened reveal the skeletal remains of Cory. Corrine has a mental breakdown and sets the bed and her mother on fire. Bart rushes in to save Olivia, but they both die in the flames. Cathy and Chris escape and watch Foxworth Hall burn to the ground.

Six years later, Cathy and Chris are now married and happily living in California with Jory and Bart Jr. under the surname Dollanganger. Corrine is institutionalized and deemed incompetent to stand trial for her crimes.

== Cast ==
- Heather Graham as Corrine Dollanganger-Winslow
- Ellen Burstyn as Olivia Foxworth, Corrine's mother
- Rose McIver as Cathy Dollanganger, Corrine's first daughter
- Wyatt Nash as Chris Dollanganger, Corrine's son and Cathy's second husband
- Bailey Buntain as Carrie Dollanganger, Corrine's second daughter
- Ellia English as Henny Beech
- Nick Searcy as Dr. Reeves
- Whitney Hoy as Sarah Reeves
- Dylan Bruce as Bart Winslow, Corrine's second husband
- Will Kemp as Julian Marquet, Cathy's first husband
- Helen Nasilski as Marisha Marquet, Julian's mother
- George Korov as Ravil Isyanov
- Stephanie Kim as Yolanda Lange
- Ross Philips as Alex Conroy
- Skyler Vallo as Lacey St. Morgan
- Megan Easton as Ashley
- Molly Hagan as Miss Calhoun
- Gabriel Bateman as Michael
- Talitha Bateman as Emma

== Production ==
=== Development and writing ===
Lifetime first announced plans to adapt the second book in the Dollanganger series on January 9, 2014, just before airing Flowers in the Attic. It was also announced by writer Kayla Alpert that the film would take place ten years after Flowers in the Attic, whereas the book picked up directly after the events of the first. Alpert stated that she started working on the script for Petals on the Wind shortly after she had finished the script for the first film.

Executive producer Michelle Weiss stated that adapting Petals on the Wind into film proved to be more difficult that the first one. She said that while Flowers was a contained story that took place in only one location, Petals has a larger setting, more storylines and takes place during a longer period of time. The biggest challenge was to contain the story within a contained time frame. She also stated the film takes place in Southern United States during the '70s.

=== Casting and filming ===
On January 28, 2014 it was announced that Heather Graham and Ellen Burstyn would reprise their roles from Flowers in the Attic as Corrine and Olivia Foxworth, respectively. On February 18 it was revealed that Rose McIver had landed the role of Cathy Dollanganger, taking over from Kiernan Shipka. During the same month, it was revealed that Wyatt Nash had been cast as Christopher; Bailey De Young's role as Carrie was announced the following day.

McIver stated that due to the film's rushed production, she only had two weeks after her first audition to practice ballet for her role, before filming started on February 25; this left her unable to read any of the books. Regarding Cathy and Chris's relationship, she stated that both of the characters "know [their relationship]'s a taboo, but nobody else understands them the way they get each other" and due to their shared trauma, it's hard for them to connect with anyone else. Nash expressed a similar sentiment, believing that it's impossible for either of them to move forward and live happy lives apart from each other.

Production for the movie was rushed and actress Rose McIver, who portrayed Cathy, began filming in February 2014, two weeks after she attended her first audition, leaving her unable to read any of the novels before portraying the role. Immediately after filming was completed in March McIver began work on the television series iZombie.

A new character, that of Chris's love interest Sarah, was created for the movie and some portions of the book, notably the sexual relationship between Cathy and her adoptive father, were removed in order to condense the book for film. Of this choice, director Kayla Alpert stated that “After doing incest, we decided we didn’t need pedophilia on top of it" and that some of the book's plot had to be condensed for the movie.

== Release ==
=== Ratings ===
In its original televised airing, Petals on the Wind was watched by 3.42 million viewers, and had a rating of 1.2 in the women 18–49 age demographic, down 37 percent from the 1.9 earned by Flowers.

=== Home media ===
On September 16, 2015, it was released as a single-disc DVD. It was later re-released on June 23, 2015, with Flowers in the Attic as a "Double Feature." On November 10, 2015, it was included in a "4-Film Collection" with Flowers in the Attic, If There Be Thorns, and Seeds of Yesterday.

== Reception ==
Petals on the Wind averaged 64 out of 100, based on four critics, on Metacritic, indicating "generally favorable reviews".

Variety reviewed the film, stating that it "looks and feels like a rush job, but improves on its predecessor in nearly every way." The A.V. Club gave the movie a rating of B−, as they felt that it "largely skews a bit underbaked to meet the promise of its own third act, and lacks the strength of Ellen Burstyn as its central figure, but there’s enough of the all-out V.C. Andrews flavor to make this installment worth a look for those who want to catch up with a family of soap people 30 years in the making." Entertainment Weekly described the film as being "muted", similarly to the first one, and stated that the actors shouldn't have taken the material as seriously as they did. Despite this, they found the film to have numerous instances that either meet or exceed the book's "ludicrous level".

== Sequels ==
On the premiere of Petals on the Wind, Lifetime announced the production of the two following books on the Dollanganger series, If There Be Thorns and Seeds of Yesterday, both of which aired in 2015.
