= Heather Graham =

American actress (born 1970)

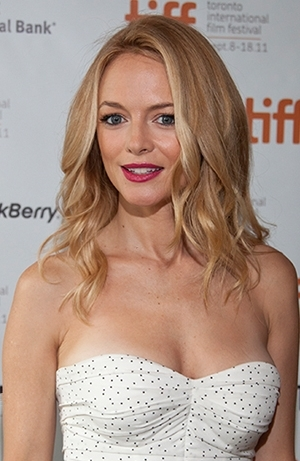
- Graham in 2011
- Born: Heather Joan Graham; January 29, 1970 (age 56); Milwaukee, Wisconsin, U.S.
- Occupations: Actress; director
- Years active: 1984–present

Heather Joan Graham (born January 29, 1970) is an American actress. The accolades she has received include nominations for two Screen Actors Guild Awards, a Critics' Choice Movie Award, and an Independent Spirit Award.

After appearing in television commercials, her first starring role in a feature film came with the teen comedy License to Drive (1988), followed by the critically acclaimed film Drugstore Cowboy (1989). She then played supporting roles on the television series Twin Peaks (1991), and in films such as Six Degrees of Separation (1993) and Swingers (1996). She gained critical praise for her role as "Rollergirl" in the film Boogie Nights (1997). This led to major roles in the comedy films Bowfinger and Austin Powers: The Spy Who Shagged Me (both 1999).

Graham had leading roles in Say It Isn't So (2001) and From Hell (2001), and continued to play supporting roles in the films Mary (2005); The Hangover (2009) and its sequel, The Hangover Part III (2013); At Any Price (2012); and Horns (2013). She has had roles on television series such as Scrubs (2004–05) and Californication (2014). In 2018, Graham made her directorial debut with the comedy Half Magic.

Graham is a public advocate for Children International and supported the climate change campaign Global Cool in 2007.

== Early life ==
Graham was born in Milwaukee. The elder of two children, her younger sister Aimee Graham is also an actress and writer. Her mother Joan (née Bransfield) is a teacher and author of children's books, and her father James Graham is a retired FBI agent. Her family relocated repeatedly before moving to Agoura Hills, California, when she was nine. She was introduced to acting during a school production of The Wizard of Oz.

After graduating from Agoura High School, Graham enrolled in extension classes at the University of California, Los Angeles, where she studied English for two years. Against her parents' wishes, Graham withdrew from UCLA to pursue acting full time.

== Career ==
=== Early work (1984–1988) ===
Graham's first film appearance was a small uncredited role in Mrs. Soffel (1984). Her first credited film appearance was in the television film Student Exchange. In 1986, she appeared on a special "Teen Week" episode of the NBC game show Scrabble. Then she appeared in numerous television commercials, and an episode of the sitcom Growing Pains in 1987. Her first high-profile starring role came in the Corey Haim/Corey Feldman vehicle License to Drive (1988), as a popular girl named Mercedes Lane, who serves as the love interest of Haim's character. Her efforts won her a Young Artist Award nomination in the Best Young Actress in a Motion Picture Comedy or Fantasy category. Her strict parents forbade her to accept the role of Heather Chandler in the black comedy Heathers (1988), which had an expletive-rich script. The same year, she had an uncredited appearance as Danny DeVito and Arnold Schwarzenegger's mother in flashbacks in their film, Twins.

=== From Drugstore Cowboy to Swingers (1989–1996) ===
In 1989, Graham was featured in Gus Van Sant's Drugstore Cowboy as Nadine, a young, drug-addicted accomplice of the two main characters (played by Matt Dillon and Kelly Lynch). Her performance gave her career an initial boost and earned her a nomination for the Independent Spirit Award for Best Supporting Actress. She rejected a steady role in a soap opera and a three-picture deal with a major studio because she thought it would be too restrictive. After Drugstore Cowboy, she appeared in Lawrence Kasdan's dark comedy I Love You to Death (1990), alongside William Hurt and Keanu Reeves, and the rock-and-roll coming-of-age film Shout (1991), for which she received a nomination for the Young Artist Award for Best Actress Starring in a Motion Picture.

After Graham co-starred with Benicio del Toro in a Calvin Klein commercial directed by David Lynch, the director cast her as Annie Blackburn in Twin Peaks, where she appeared in the final six episodes. Following the show's cancellation, Graham reprised the role of Blackburn in the 1992 prequel film Twin Peaks: Fire Walk with Me.

She featured in Diggstown (1992), alongside James Woods; the well-received Six Degrees of Separation (1993), alongside Will Smith; and The Ballad of Little Jo (1993), alongside Ian McKellen before reteaming with Gus Van Sant for the critically panned film adaptation of Even Cowgirls Get the Blues, alongside Uma Thurman. The same year she co-starred as Mary Kennedy Taylor in Mrs. Parker and the Vicious Circle. In 1995, she starred as Jackie in the poorly received Desert Winds and guest-starred in an episode of the television series Fallen Angels. She had a small but important role in Swingers (1996), where she played Lorraine, Jon Favreau's love interest. She also played a small role as Maggie Bowen in Entertaining Angels: The Dorothy Day Story (1996).

=== Wider industry and public recognition (1997–2003) ===
Graham's popularity significantly increased after playing a young porn star in the critically acclaimed film Boogie Nights (1997). The cast received a nomination for the Screen Actors Guild Award for Outstanding Performance by a Cast in a Motion Picture. The same year, she also starred in the Gregg Araki film Nowhere, and had a cameo in the horror hit Scream 2 as a fictionalised version of herself, portraying Casey Becker in the film within a film Stab. She was subsequently cast in Two Girls and a Guy (1998), a film mainly based upon dialogue between the characters, shot in 11 days, which co-starred Robert Downey Jr. and Natasha Gregson; and the sci-fi film Lost in Space, which was met with mostly negative reviews, and grossed $69,117,629 domestically on a production budget of $80 million. The cast was signed on for sequels that remain unmade.

She starred as Felicity Shagwell in the sequel Austin Powers: The Spy Who Shagged Me (1999), which was a box-office hit. Shagwell is one of her best-known roles and became a fan favorite. Her turn as Shagwell also earned her a nomination for the Saturn Award for Best Actress. She appeared in the music video for Lenny Kravitz's cover of "American Woman". Also in 1999, Graham co-starred as Daisy in the movie Bowfinger, opposite Steve Martin and Eddie Murphy.

The 2000 film Committed was her first starring vehicle. She played Joline, a devoted-beyond-reason young wife looking for the husband who left her. While the film itself received mixed reviews, the Rotten Tomatoes summary of critics felt that "Graham shows she can play a central character", but noted "she's not enough to make Committed successful". The following year, she co-starred as Annie Matthews, an unhappily married woman, in Edward Burns' Sidewalks of New York. In 2002, she starred with Joseph Fiennes in Chen Kaige's English-language debut film Killing Me Softly, which received overwhelmingly negative response from critics and a 0% at Rotten Tomatoes, with the consensus being: "Respected director Chen Kaige's first English-language film is a spectacularly misguided erotic thriller, with ludicrous plot twists and cringe-worthy dialogue". In 2009, the site also rated it No. 12 on the countdown of the worst films over the last ten years.

Graham's other appearances in mainstream fare include playing a fictionalized version of the Jack the Ripper murder victim Mary Kelly in the film From Hell (2001), starring Johnny Depp; Anger Management (2003), starring Adam Sandler and Jack Nicholson; the Farrelly Brothers comedy Say It Isn't So (2001), opposite Sally Field; The Guru, co-starring Jimi Mistry, and Hope Springs (2003), co-starring Colin Firth.

=== Focus on independent films and television (2004–2008) ===
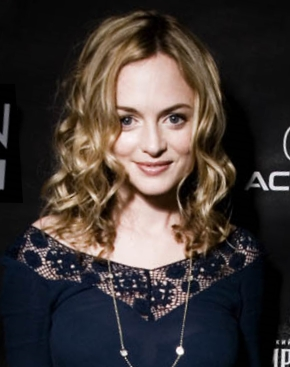
Graham in June 2007

From 2004 to 2008, Graham starred in several independent films Gray Matters, Broken, Adrift in Manhattan (all 2007), and Miss Conception (2008), most of which received generally negative reviews and went largely unnoticed at the box office. Her 2005 film Mary holds a 63% rating on Rotten Tomatoes, her first "Fresh" film since Bowfinger. The film premiered at the 2005 Venice Film Festival where it won the Special Jury Prize, as well as three smaller awards. The film also played at the 2005 Toronto International Film Festival, Deauville Film Festival, and San Sebastián International Film Festival, and co-starred Juliette Binoche, Forest Whitaker, Marion Cotillard, and Matthew Modine. In 2006, she co-starred in Bobby as Angela; the film's cast was nominated for a Screen Actors Guild Award for Outstanding Performance by a Cast in a Motion Picture.

Graham also spoke about developing a comedy film titled The Accidental Virgin, which would have focused on "female sexual confusion", telling the story of a woman who has not had sex in a year. The film has not been made. She also stated she would be interested in directing in the future if it is "something that, its burning in my mind that I need to do".

On television, Graham played herself in an episode of the TV series Sex and the City. She was given special guest-star status on nine episodes of Scrubs during its fourth season (2004–2005), and also appeared as George Michael Bluth's ethics teacher in an episode of Arrested Development in 2004. She played Emily Sanders in Emily's Reasons Why Not, but the sitcom was cancelled after airing only one episode.

=== The Hangover and after (2009–present) ===
In 2009, Graham played the stripper with a heart of gold, Jade, in The Hangover (2009), which was released to critical and box-office success. She won the role after Lindsay Lohan turned it down. Though she did not return for the sequel The Hangover Part II (2011), she reprised her role in the final installment of the trilogy, The Hangover Part III (2013). In 2010, she starred in Boogie Woogie, followed by roles in the unsuccessful films Father of Invention, 5 Days of War, Judy Moody and the Not Bummer Summer (all 2011), and About Cherry (2012). Graham was also credited for archive footage of her from Scream 2 re-used in Scream 4 (2011).

Graham voiced the character of Antonia Bayle in the online role-playing video game EverQuest 2.

She played Meredith Crown in At Any Price (2012), which stars Dennis Quaid and Zac Efron, and was selected to compete for the Golden Lion at the 69th Venice International Film Festival, and later screened as an official selection at the Telluride and Toronto Film Festivals. Other roles include Veronica, The Waitress in Horns (2013), mob lawyer Annette Stratton-Osborne in Behaving Badly (2014), and short story writer Mary Bellanova in My Dead Boyfriend (2016). She wrote a comedy screenplay called Half Magic, which in 2013 she stated she wanted to direct. She said the story focuses on "these female friends and sexuality and about people having a sense of shame about sexuality and learning how to have a healthier attitude about it [...] It also deals with male/female relationships and sexism". The film was released in 2018.

In 2012, she was a member of the jury of the 15th Shanghai International Film Festival.

In 2014, she starred in the second adaptation of the V. C. Andrews novel Flowers in the Attic on the Lifetime network. She played the character of Corrine Dollanganger, an evil mother who locks her four children in an attic to receive an inheritance from her dying father. Graham also appeared in two TV films sequels based on the V.C. Andrews' series: Petals on the Wind and If There Be Thorns, continuing to play the role of Corrine Dollanganger. She appeared in the final season of Californication as the mother of David Duchovny's long-lost son.

In 2015, she provided the voice and motion capture performance of Jessica Rose in Call of Duty: Black Ops III in the Zombies mode map, "Shadows of Evil".

In 2018, she co-starred in the David Cross dark comedy series Bliss, which was released by the BritBox streaming service. It starred Stephen Mangan as Andrew, a fraudulent travel writer, who struggles to maintain long-term relationships with two partners, Kim (Graham) and Denise (Jo Hartley), who are not aware of one another.

In 2023, Graham starred as Charlotte Sanders in the Netflix Christmas-themed film Best. Christmas. Ever! alongside Brandy Norwood, Jason Biggs and Matt Cedeño.

Graham wrote, directed, and starred in Chosen Family, which was released in 2024.

== Activism ==
Besides her acting work, Graham is also an activist who serves as a public advocate for the nongovernmental organization (NGO) Children International. She stated that what she likes about Children International is that "you are helping a child have a better life. It's great for that child to know that someone who lives in another country cares about them". Graham works with the Cambodian Children's Fund, also an NGO, which provides supplies and education, and campaigns to stop slavery. "There's a lot of human trafficking in Cambodia," Graham has said. "Women are dying because they don't have $15 to give birth in a hospital. The [Children's Fund] provides free education, clean water and healthcare for communities... We're creating future leaders who will be able to help themselves."

In 2007, she supported the climate change campaign Global Cool and appeared in Shekhar Kapur's short film Global Cool alongside Sienna Miller.

== Public image ==
Graham was ranked at number 40 in FHM's 100 Sexiest Women in the World list in 2000, number 95 in 2001 list, number 97 in the 2002 list, number 74 in the 2005 list and at number 98 in 2006 list. In 2001, she was named one of the 50 Most Beautiful People by People. In 2003, she posed for a photoshoot by photographer Sam Jones during which she was levitated several feet into the air by a magician who later also sawed her in half. Also in 2003, Graham appeared on the cover of Time for an article titled "The Science of Meditation". To promote Emily's Reasons Why Not, she posed for a LIFE cover story, printed weeks in advance of the assumed series schedule, referring to her as "TV's sexiest star", which appeared in the January 27, 2006, issue.

Graham is often cast in sexual roles, including those of Felicity Shagwell (Austin Powers: The Spy who Shagged Me), porn stars Rollergirl (Boogie Nights) and Sharonna (The Guru), prostitute Mary Kelly (From Hell), porn director Margaret (About Cherry), and stripper Jade (The Hangover and The Hangover, Part III). She stated she finds these types of roles and the issue of sexuality fascinating, and believes that "our culture sends out mixed messages to women about sex. Are women supposed to be sexually alive people, or are we supposed to be 'good' mothers who would never do those things?" and that she likes "the fact some of my roles maybe help people open their minds about the way they think about sex".

In 2005, Graham became the spokeswoman for the Garnier brand of hair care products.

In 2017, Graham recounted a time in the early 2000s when Hollywood producer Harvey Weinstein indirectly implied that he would give her a role of her choice if she slept with him. Later, Graham indicated she canceled a planned meeting with Weinstein at a hotel when a friend was unable to accompany her. Graham did not have further contact with Weinstein and she was never cast in any films he produced.

== Personal life ==
Graham has been estranged from her parents in the past. Regarding the media's perception of her relationship with her parents, she stated: "I don't really like to talk about my parents because I just feel that it gets misinterpreted in the press."

Graham has been practicing transcendental meditation since 1991 after being introduced to it by David Lynch. She has also expressed her dislike of reality television, stating in a 2007 interview: "I think some of it, it seems strange – why do we all want to watch people be so miserable? Other people's pain and misery – it seems kind of sad."

In 1992, Graham dated James Woods, her co-star in the film Diggstown. She later dated British singer Adam Ant. From 2008 to 2011, she was in a relationship with screenwriter Yaniv Raz. She also dated Heath Ledger, after the couple met in the Czech Republic during the summer of 2000, where she was filming From Hell and he was filming A Knight's Tale.

She has been dating real estate investor and world record snowboarder John de Neufville since 2022.

== Filmography ==
=== Film ===
Year	Title	Role	Notes
1984	Mrs. Soffel	Factory Girl	Uncredited
1987	Student Exchange	Dorrie Ryder	
1988	License to Drive	Mercedes Lane	
1988	Twins	Young Mary Ann Benedict	Uncredited
1989	Drugstore Cowboy	Nadine	
1990	I Love You to Death	Bridget	
1991	Guilty as Charged	Kimberly	
1991	Shout	Sara Benedict	
1992	Twin Peaks: Fire Walk with Me	Annie Blackburn	
1992	Diggstown	Emily Forrester	
1993	The Ballad of Little Jo	Mary Addie	
1993	Even Cowgirls Get the Blues	Cowgirl Heather	
1993	Six Degrees of Separation	Elizabeth	
1994	Mrs. Parker and the Vicious Circle	Mary Kennedy Taylor	
1994	Don't Do It	Suzanna	
1995	Desert Winds	Jackie	
1995	Terrified	Olive	
1996	Swingers	Lorraine	
1996	Entertaining Angels: The Dorothy Day Story	Maggie Bowen	
1997	Nowhere	Lilith	
1997	Two Girls and a Guy	Carla Bennett	
1997	Boogie Nights	Brandy / Rollergirl	
1997	Kiss & Tell	Susan Pretsel	
1997	Scream 2	'Stab' Casey Becker	Cameo
1998	Lost in Space	Dr. Judy Robinson	
1999	Austin Powers: The Spy Who Shagged Me	Felicity Shagwell	
1999	Bowfinger	Daisy	
2000	Committed	Joline	
2001	Say It Isn't So	Josephine Wingfield	
2001	Sidewalks of New York	Annie	
2001	From Hell	Mary Jane Kelly	
2002	Killing Me Softly	Alice Tallis	
2002	The Guru	Sharonna	
2003	Anger Management	Kendra	Uncredited cameo
2003	Hope Springs	Mandy	
2004	Blessed	Samantha Howard	
2005	Mary	Elizabeth Younger	
2005	Cake	Pippa McGee	Also executive producer
2006	The Oh in Ohio	Justine	
2006	Bobby	Angela	
2006	Gray Matters	Gray Baldwin	
2006	Broken	Hope	
2007	Adrift in Manhattan	Rose Phipps	
2007	Have Dreams, Will Travel	Aunt	
2008	Alien Love Triangle	Elizabeth	Short film
2008	Miss Conception	Georgina Salt	
2008	Baby on Board	Angela Marks	
2009	ExTerminators	Alex	
2009	The Hangover	Jade	
2009	Boogie Woogie	Beth Freemantle	
2010	Father of Invention	Phoebe	
2011	The Flying Machine	Georgie	
2011	Son of Morning	Josephine Tuttle	
2011	5 Days of War	Miriam Eisner	
2011	Judy Moody and the Not Bummer Summer	Aunt Opal Moody	
2012	About Cherry	Margaret	
2012	At Any Price	Meredith Crown	
2013	The Hangover Part III	Jade	
2013	Compulsion	Amy	
2013	Horns	Veronica	
2014	Goodbye to All That	Stephanie	
2014	Behaving Badly	Annette Stratton-Osborne	
2016	Norm of the North	Vera	Voice
2016	My Dead Boyfriend	Mary McCrawley	
2017	Wetlands	Savannah	
2017	Last Rampage	Dorothy Tison	
2018	Half Magic	Honey	Also director and writer
2019	The Rest of Us	Cami	
2020	Desperados	Angel de la Paz	
2020	Love, Guaranteed	Tamara Taylor	
2020	Wander	Shelly Luscomb	
2021	The Last Son	Anna	
2023	On a Wing and a Prayer	Terri White	
2023	Suitable Flesh	Elizabeth Derby	
2023	Oracle	Kate Simmons	
2023	The Other Zoey	Paula	
2023	Best. Christmas. Ever!	Charlotte Sanders	
2024	Chosen Family	Ann	Also director and writer
2024	Place of Bones	Pandora	
2025	Gunslingers	Val	
2026	They Will Kill You	Sharon Vanderbilt	
TBA	The Young People	TBA	Post-production

=== Television ===
Year	Title	Role	Notes
1987	Growing Pains	Cindy / Samantha	2 episodes
1987	Student Exchange	Dorrie Ryder	Television film
1991	Twin Peaks	Annie Blackburn	6 episodes
1992	O Pioneers!	Young Alexandra Bergson	Television film
1995	Fallen Angels	Carol Whalen	Episode: "Tomorrow I Die"
1996	The Outer Limits	Alicia	Episode: "Resurrection"
1996	Bullet Hearts	Carlene Prue	Pilot
1998	Fantasy Island	Jackie	Uncredited; Episode: "Pilot"
1999	Saturday Night Live	Herself (host)	Episode: "Heather Graham/Marc Anthony"
2002	Sex and the City	Herself	Episode: "Critical Condition"
2004	Arrested Development	Beth Baerly	Episode: "Shock and Aww"
2004–2005	Scrubs	Dr. Molly Clock	9 episodes
2006	Emily's Reasons Why Not	Emily Sanders	6 episodes, also producer
2011	Little in Common	Ellie Weller	Pilot
2011	Portlandia	Heather	Episode: "Baseball"
2014	Flowers in the Attic	Corrine Dollanganger/Foxworth	Television film
2014	Petals on the Wind	Corrine Winslow	Television film
2014	Californication	Julia	9 episodes
2015	If There Be Thorns	Corrine Foxworth	Television film
2015	Studio City	Stevie	Pilot
2016–2017	Flaked	Tilly	4 episodes
2016–2018	Angie Tribeca	Diane Duran	5 episodes
2017	Law & Order True Crime	Judalon Smyth	7 episodes
2018	Bliss	Kim Marsden	6 episodes
2018–2019	Get Shorty	Hannah	2 episodes
2019	The Hypnotist's Love Story	Sasha	Pilot, also executive producer
2020	The Stand	Rita Blakemoor	Episode: "Pocket Savior"
2023	Extrapolations	Hannah	Episode: "2037: A Raven Story"
2026	Carrie	Madison Hargensen	3 episodes

=== Video games ===
Year	Title	Role	Notes
2004	EverQuest II	Antonia Bayle - Queen of Qeynos	Voice
2015	Call of Duty: Black Ops III	Jessica Rose	Voice and motion capture

=== Music videos ===
Year	Title	Role	Artist	Ref.
1999	"American Woman"	Dancer	Lenny Kravitz	
2011	"The Day"	Angel	Moby	

== Awards and nominations ==
Year	Accolade	Title	Results
1989	Young Artist Award, Best Young Actress in a Motion Picture Comedy or Fantasy	License to Drive	Nominated
1990	Independent Spirit Award for Best Supporting Female	Drugstore Cowboy	Nominated
1992	Young Artist Award, Best Young Actress Starring in a Motion Picture	Shout	Nominated
1998	Florida Film Critics Circle Award, Best Ensemble Cast	Boogie Nights	Won
1998	MTV Movie + TV Award, Best Breakthrough Performance	Boogie Nights	Won
1998	Screen Actors Guild Award for Outstanding Performance by a Cast in a Motion Picture	Boogie Nights	Nominated
1999	ShoWest Convention Award, Female Star of Tomorrow		Won
2000	Blockbuster Entertainment Award, Favorite Actress - Comedy	Bowfinger	Nominated
2000	Blockbuster Entertainment Award, Favorite Actress - Comedy	Austin Powers: The Spy Who Shagged Me	Won
2000	Nickelodeon Kid's Choice Award, Favorite Movie Couple (shared with Mike Myers)	Austin Powers: The Spy Who Shagged Me	Nominated
2000	Saturn Award, Best Lead Actress	Austin Powers: The Spy Who Shagged Me	Nominated
2006	Hollywood Film Festival Award, Ensemble of the Year	Bobby	Won
2007	Critics Choice Award, Best Acting Ensemble	Bobby	Nominated
2007	Screen Actors Guild Award for Outstanding Performance by a Cast in a Motion Picture	Bobby	Nominated
2009	Award Circuit Community Award, Best Cast Ensemble	The Hangover	Nominated
2017	San Diego International Film Festival - Virtuoso Award		Awarded
