= Lindsay Parker =

American actress (born 1980)

- Born: March 30, 1980 (age 46); Los Angeles, California, U.S.
- Occupation: Actress
- Years active: 1986–2007

Lindsay Parker (born March 30, 1980) is an American former actress.

== Career ==
Parker started her career as Little Girl on an episode of MacGyver. She appeared in the film Shocker three years later, and played Kirstie Alley's daughter Melissa in the 1987 film Infidelity. She provided the voice of Corey in Cartoon All-Stars to the Rescue and also played Carrie in the 1987 film Flowers in the Attic. She remained active in acting until 2007.

In April 2014, Parker published her first children's book, Fiona Von Finnigan – Fairy Tale Fixer, written and illustrated entirely by her. Her father is Andy Parker, the drummer of the rock band UFO.
