= Flowers in the Attic (2014 film) =

2014 Canadian–American film

- Genre: Drama; Romance; Thriller
- Based on: Flowers in the Attic by V. C. Andrews
- Screenplay by: Kayla Alpert
- Directed by: Deborah Chow
- Starring: Heather Graham; Kiernan Shipka; Mason Dye; Ava Telek; Maxwell Kovach; Dylan Bruce; Chad Willett; Ellen Burstyn
- Theme music composer: Mario Grigorov
- Countries of origin: United States; Canada
- Original language: English

Production
- Executive producers: Charles W. Fries; Lisa Hamilton-Daly; Merideth Finn; Tanya Lopez; Michele Weiss; Rob Sharenow
- Producers: Harvey Kahn; Damian Ganczewski
- Cinematography: Miroslaw Baszak
- Editor: Jamie Alain
- Running time: 90 minutes
- Production companies: MGM Television; Front Street Pictures, Inc.; Cue the Dog Productions; Fries Film Company, Inc.

Original release
- Network: Lifetime
- Release: January 14, 2014

Related
- Petals on the Wind

Flowers in the Attic is a 2014 Lifetime psychological thriller drama movie directed by Deborah Chow. It is the second adaptation of V. C. Andrews’ 1979 novel of the same name.

A sequel, Petals on the Wind, based on the novel of the same name, premiered on May 26, 2014, on Lifetime. The network announced the developing of the following books in the series, If There Be Thorns and Seeds of Yesterday, which both aired in 2015.

== Plot ==
In 1957, the Dollanganger children — 14-year-old Chris, 12-year-old Cathy, and 5-year-old twins Carrie and Cory — live happily with their parents, Christopher and Corrine, in Pennsylvania. When Christopher dies in a car crash, the family is left debt-ridden. Four months later, Corrine announces that they are going to move and live with her wealthy parents in Virginia. She explains to her children that she was estranged from her parents and that's why she changed her last name from her maiden name, Foxworth.

On arrival at Foxworth Hall, Corrine's grim, cold-hearted mother, Olivia, takes the children to a small room in the attic. The next day, the children are given a list of rules and Olivia tells them to stay in the attic at all times. Corrine explains that her father, Malcolm, disowned her for eloping with Christopher, who was actually her biological half-uncle (her father's younger half-brother) and they were disinherited. She promises the children she will make her father forgive her; once he has forgiven her, she will introduce him to the children, and they will live happily together at Foxworth Hall.

Corrine's visits to the attic become less frequent as she begins to enjoy her new-found wealth and starts a relationship with her father's lawyer, Bart Winslow. She informs the children that while her father has forgiven her, she cannot let them meet him because she claimed that she did not have any children; thus, they will have to remain in the attic until Malcolm dies. Corrine's visits all but cease during the next year. Due to lack of fresh air and sunshine, the twins' growth has severely slowed; meanwhile, Cathy and Chris are entering puberty. Chris accidentally walks in on Cathy while she is trying on her first bra. Olivia catches them and calls them sinners and tries to cut off Cathy's hair as punishment. Chris stops her, but she threatens to starve them for a week if he does not cut Cathy's hair himself. Cathy and Chris refuse to comply and give their remaining food to the twins while they rely mostly on water. Olivia appears to relent and leaves them a basket of food; however, Cathy awakens to find tar in her hair the next morning. As Chris reluctantly cuts her hair, he tells her that he finds her beautiful, but knows it is wrong to think of her like that.

Another year passes and Corrine has not visited in months. Cathy and Chris conclude that their mother has abandoned them and begin planning their escape. When Corrine does return, she happily announces she has married Bart and the reason for her absence was her honeymoon in Europe. She is upset that the children are not more excited and seems oblivious to the deterioration in the twins. Olivia soon brings the children sugar-powdered doughnuts, which she says are a gift from their mother. Olivia beats Chris with a belt after he demands to be called by his name rather than "boy," because he was named after his father, whose name the family does not mention due to his marriage to Corrine. Cathy tends to his wounds and admits her fear of losing him. Chris assures her nothing will happen to him and they kiss. When Olivia comes to deliver their food, Chris tells her that she was right about them being the "devil's spawn" and pleads for forgiveness. After she leaves, Chris reveals the whole scene was a scheme to get an impression of the attic key in soap, and he carves a wooden copy.

Now able to leave the attic, Cathy and Chris begin to steal money from their mother's room to finance an escape by train. On a night raid, Cathy finds Bart asleep and kisses him. Chris later overhears his mother and Bart talking about a dream of a young, blonde-haired girl coming into the room and kissing Bart. Chris angrily confronts Cathy, who assures him that the kiss meant nothing and she only did it out of curiosity. She kisses him and they end up having sex. Cathy suggests they move to Florida and Chris tells her that he loves her and can never love anyone else. Carrie suddenly announces that Cory is seriously ill. Cathy tells Olivia and Corrine of this and demands her mother take Cory to a hospital, threatening revenge if she does not. The next day, Corrine tells them Cory had pneumonia and died, and has already been buried.

Devastated by Cory's death and in fear for their lives, Cathy and Chris decide to take all the money they have collected and grab as much jewelry as they can and escape. During their search for valuables, they discover that Corrine and Bart have left Foxworth Hall. Chris overhears a conversation between the butler and a maid, and learns that Olivia has been leaving poison to kill "the mice" in the attic and that their grandfather died seven months ago. Cathy shows Chris how Cory's pet mouse has died after eating a piece of powdered doughnut, revealing that the poison was in the powdered sugar on the doughnuts. Olivia then comes to take their key, and Chris restrains her long enough for Cathy and Carrie to escape. Olivia chases after them, but panics due to her claustrophobia when Chris shuts the door and turns the lights off. In defeat, Olivia states that their mother was the one who poisoned them and not her, but they ignore her and climb out the window, fleeing on foot.

During their escape, they run into the butler, who realizes they are Corrine's children. Horrified, he tells them to run while he cuts off the electric fence for them. They board a train to Florida and Chris assures Cathy that their ordeal is finally over. She vows revenge on their mother.

== Cast ==
- Heather Graham as Corrine Dollanganger
- Ellen Burstyn as Olivia Foxworth, Corrine's mother
- Kiernan Shipka as Cathy Dollanganger, Corrine's first daughter
- Mason Dye as Chris Dollanganger, Corrine's first son
- Ava Telek as Carrie Dollanganger, Corrine's second daughter and Cory's fraternal twin sister
- Maxwell Kovach as Cory Dollanganger, Corrine's second son and Carrie's fraternal twin brother
- Dylan Bruce as Bart Winslow, Corrine's second husband
- Chad Willett as Christopher Dollanganger, Corrine's first husband
- Beau Daniels as Malcolm Neal Foxworth, Corrine's father
- Andrew Kavadas as John Amos, Olivia's cousin
- Don Thompson as Conductor

== Production ==
=== Casting ===
Flowers in the Attic was announced on July 23, 2013, as a television film for the Lifetime network. It was also announced that the film would star Heather Graham as Corrine Dollanganger and Ellen Burstyn as Olivia Foxworth. It was also announced that the film would be directed by Deborah Chow and written by Kayla Alpert.

On August 14, it was announced that Kiernan Shipka and Mason Dye had been cast as Cathy and Chris respectively. During the same month, it was announced that Dylan Bruce had joined the cast as Bart Winslow, Corrine's love interest.

== Release ==
=== Broadcast ===
In its original televised airing, the film was watched by 6.06 million total viewers, and had a rating (percentage) of 1.9 in the 18-49 age demographic. At the time, it was cable's number-one original movie performance since the October 2012 premiere of Steel Magnolias.

=== Home media ===
On April 15, 2014, Flowers in the Attic was released in DVD format for Region 1. The single disc featured the entire film, as well as a behind-the-scenes featurette with the cast and crew. It was later re-released on June 23, 2015, with Petals on the Wind as a "Double Feature." On November 10, 2015, it was included in a "4-Film Collection" with Petals on the Wind, If There Be Thorns, and Seeds of Yesterday.

== Reception ==
=== Critical response ===
Flowers in the Attic received mixed reviews from critics, albeit far more positive reviews than the 1987 adaptation. Review aggregator website Rotten Tomatoes reports that 52% of 25 critics gave the film a positive review; the consensus reads, "This twisted tale of premium cable fodder winds up collecting dust in a stale adaptation of Flowers in the Attic." The film averaged 49 out of 100, based on 22 critics, on Metacritic, indicating "mixed or average" reviews.

=== Accolades ===
For her performance, Burstyn was nominated for a Critics' Choice Television Award, a Primetime Emmy Award, and a Screen Actors Guild Award. Shipka was nominated an Online Film & Television Association Award for her performance.

== Sequels ==
Based on the next book of the Dollanganger series, Petals on the Wind premiered on Lifetime on May 26, 2014, earning 3.4 million viewers, down from the 6.1 million earned by Flowers. Unlike the book, the film jumped ten years ahead from the events of Flowers. It starred Rose McIver as Cathy, Wyatt Nash as Christopher, replacing Kiernan Shipka and Mason Dye from the previous movie, respectively, and Will Kemp as Julian Marquet, with Heather Graham as Corrine and Ellen Burstyn as Olivia Foxworth. Production for the film began on February 25, 2014, in Los Angeles.

On the premiere of the sequel, Lifetime announced the production of the two following books in the Dollanganger series, If There Be Thorns and Seeds of Yesterday, both which premiered in 2015. Both sequels were shot by cinematographer James Liston.

A 6th adaptation includes the Lifetime series Flowers in the Attic: The Origin (2022, 4 episodes).
