= If There Be Thorns =

1981 novel by Virginia C. Andrews

- Paperback edition
- Author: V. C. Andrews
- Language: English
- Series: Dollanganger series
- Genre: Gothic horror Family saga
- Publisher: Simon & Schuster
- Publication date: 1981
- Publication place: United States
- Media type: Print
- Pages: 384
- ISBN: 0-671-72945-4 (1990 reissues)
- OCLC: 23719996
- Preceded by: Petals on the Wind (1980)
- Followed by: Seeds of Yesterday (1984)

If There Be Thorns is a novel by Virginia C. Andrews which was published in 1981. It is the third book in the Dollanganger series. The story takes place in the year 1982. A Lifetime movie of the same name premiered on April 5, 2015.

== Plot ==
The book is narrated by two half-brothers, Jory and Bart Sheffield. Jory is a handsome, talented fourteen-year-old boy who wants to follow his mother Cathy in her career in the ballet, while nine-year old Bart, who sees himself as plain and clumsy, feels inferior to his brother. Bart spends his time in his own world of pretend—often covering bad things that he does with fantasies he creates. He also has congenital analgesia and cannot feel pain as a result, putting him at serious risk of injury or death by infection.

By now, Cathy and Chris live together as husband and wife. To hide their history, they tell the boys and others that Chris was Paul's younger brother. Cathy is a loving mother to her sons but shows some favoritism towards Jory. Unable to have more children, she adopts Cindy, the two-year-old daughter of a former dance student who was killed in an accident. She longs to have a girl, as well as a child that is hers and Christopher's. Initially against this, Chris comes to accept Cindy as does Jory, but Bart is upset and resentful.

Lonely from all the attention his siblings are receiving, Bart befriends the new elderly next door neighbor, who invites him over for cookies and ice cream and encourages him to call her "Grandmother." Jory eventually goes next door as well to see whom Bart keeps visiting, only to have the old lady tell him that she is actually his grandmother. Jory initially doesn't believe her and avoids her at all costs. Bart, on the other hand, soon develops an affectionate friendship with the old woman, and she does her best to give Bart whatever he wants while making Bart promise to keep her gifts—and their relationship—a secret from his mother.

The old lady's butler, John Amos, also seems to befriend Bart, but begins to fill the boy's mind with stories about the sinful nature of women. John reveals that the old woman is truly Bart's grandmother, Corrine Foxworth Winslow. He also gives Bart a diary that belonged to his biological great-grandfather, Malcolm Foxworth, claiming that this journal will help Bart become as powerful and successful as Malcolm. Bart begins to pretend that he is his great-grandfather, who hated women and was obsessed with their degradation.

Bart becomes destructive and violent towards his parents and siblings; he kicks Jory in the privates, and even tries to drown Cindy in her baby pool. Jory's dog, Clover, comes up missing and is later found dead with a piece of barbed wire twisted about his neck. Bart's family notice the changes but only Jory suspects that the mysterious woman next door is responsible. At the same time, Jory starts to become suspicious of his parents' relationship, noticing their family resemblance and wondering why his mother would marry her first husband Paul, who was much older than her, before Chris.

After Bart nearly dies from tetanus, Jory finally tells Chris of his suspicions about the lady next door. When they confront her, Chris realizes that the old lady is his mother, Corrine, who pleads with him to forgive her. Indifferent to her pleas, Chris orders her to stay away from their family, especially Bart. However, he decides not to tell Cathy about what happened, knowing Cathy's feelings about their mother might result in a violent confrontation.

At the same time, Cathy is injured in an accident and told that she will never dance again. A wheelchair user now, she begins to write out the story of her life. Bart filches his mother's manuscript pages and is enraged to learn the truth about his parents: Cathy and Chris are brother and sister, and his grandmother locked them in an attic for years, slowly poisoning them to gain an inheritance. The news causes Bart to cling to the only person who has seemingly not yet lied to him: John. He proudly calls his parents sinners and "Devil's spawn". Jory finds out the truth when his paternal grandmother Madame Marisha Rosencoff - she is the mother of Jory's biological father Julian Marquet- visits and confronts Cathy about her relationship with "her brother Christopher". At first shocked and disgusted, Jory forgives his parents after he learns of their tragic past.

Cathy finally learns about the woman next door when Bart accidentally says that she gives him anything he wants, and she goes to confront their neighbor. The old woman tries to hide her identity, but Cathy recognizes her voice as her mother's. Corrine expresses remorse for her crimes against her children and begs for Cathy's forgiveness. Enraged by her mother's audacity, Cathy attacks her, but John knocks both women unconscious. Working on John's orders, Bart, who now believes he is a vessel for his great-grandfather's vengeful spirit, locks Cathy and Corrine in the cellar, where John plans to starve them to death.

Hearing this plan, Bart realizes how much he loves his mother and grandmother, despite their actions, and he tells Chris where they are. Before they can be reached, the house catches fire. Bart manages to unlock the cellar door, but Corrine orders Bart to go back outside. She saves Cathy, but as she emerges from the house, her clothes catch fire. Chris runs to her and helps put out the flames, but Corrine's heart gives out and she dies. John dies inside, abandoned to his fate.

The epilogue, narrated by Cathy, describes her emotional forgiveness of her mother at Corrine's funeral. For the sake of their three children, Cathy and Chris realize that they must never allow their biological relationship to be revealed. Bart seems to have recovered from the worst of his madness, but still dwells on the power wielded by his great-grandfather, whose millions he now stands to inherit.

== Adaptation ==
If There Be Thorns was adapted as an original Lifetime film. It premiered on April 5, 2015. The sequel, Seeds of Yesterday, has also been adapted for a television film, and was released the same year as part of a special two-night event concluding the series.
