= Douglas Pipes =

American film score composer

Douglas Pipes is an American film score composer whose feature films include the Academy Award-nominated Monster House, the horror film Trick 'r Treat, and the Christmas comedy-horror film Krampus. His brassy instrumentations have drawn comparisons to action-music composer guru Alan Silvestri and his other orchestral-music composer counterparts Michael Giacchino, J.A.C. Redford and Joel McNeely. His chance encounter with Gil Kenan at UCLA California made him the perfect composer for this soundtrack and composed the music on his short film The Lark.

Awards include International Film Music Critics Association "Best Original Score for a Comedy Film 2015" for the Horror/Comedy Krampus, "Compositor Revalacion" for Monster House at the 3rd International Film Music Conference in Ubeda, Spain and "Best Animation” at the Royal Television Society in the United Kingdom. Nominations include “Discovery of the Year" for Monster House at the 2006 World Soundtrack Awards in Ghent, Belgium, "Best Music" at the 2007 Saturn Awards, "Best Horror Score" 2009 for Trick 'r Treat 2009 and "Best New Composer" 2006 for Monster House from the International Film Music Critics Association.

Soundtrack CDs are available from LaLaLand Records and vinyl from Waxwork Records.

Pipes also works with the rock band The Airborne Toxic Event, providing arrangements and orchestrations for symphony concerts across the U.S.

Pipes has been commissioned twice by the Dallas Chamber Symphony a to compose original scores for their silent film series. In 2014, he wrote an original score for Alfred Hitchcock's silent film The Lodger: A Story of the London Fog. The score premiered in concert on October 8, 2014. In 2017, he wrote an original score for the Buster Keaton's silent film The General, which premiered October 17, 2017. Both premieres were held at Moody Performance Hall and conducted by Richard McKay.

== Credits ==
- The Babysitter (2017) by McG
- The General (2017) (commissioned live concert score) by Buster Keaton
- Craggio by Zach Shields
- The Shadowman (2016)
- Krampus (2015) by Michael Dougherty
- If There Be Thorns (2015) (original score music) by VC Andrews, dir. Nancy Savoca
- Seeds of Yesterday (2015) (original score music) by VC Andrews, dir. Shawn Ku
- The Lodger (2014) (commissioned live concert score) by Alfred Hitchcock
- Little Paradise (2014) (original score music) by Natan Moss
- Waking (2013) (original score music) by Ben Shelton
- Barbie: Mariposa and the Fairy Princess (2013) (original score music)
- Bad Blood Days (2010) (original score music)
- City of Ember (2008) (additional music composer, writer and performer: Mayor's Fanfare) by Gil Kenan
- Trick 'r Treat (2007) (original score composer) by Michael Dougherty
- Monster House (2006) (original score composer) by Gil Kenan
- The Three Body Problem (2004) (composer)
- Walter (2003) (composer)
- The Lark (2002) (original music)
- Grandpa (1990) (composer)
- Bonneville, Arizona (1989) (composer)
- Moonstalker (1989) (original music) by Michael O'Rourke
