= Seeds of Yesterday =

Novel by V. C. Andrews

- First edition cover
- Author: V. C. Andrews
- Language: English
- Series: Dollanganger Series
- Genre: Gothic horror family saga novel
- Publisher: Simon & Schuster
- Publication date: 1984
- Publication place: United States
- Media type: Print (hardback & paperback)
- Pages: 426 pp
- ISBN: 0-671-72948-9 (1990 reissue)
- OCLC: 438301681
- Preceded by: If There Be Thorns (1981)
- Followed by: Garden of Shadows (1986)

Seeds of Yesterday is a novel written by V. C. Andrews. It is the fourth book in the Dollanganger Series. The story continues from the point of view of the protagonist, Cathy, following her from the age of 52 until her death a few years later. Cathy was born in April 1945, meaning the events in the book occur between 1997–2001, which was fifteen years into the future at the time the book was originally published in 1983. The film adaptation aired April 12, 2015 on Lifetime.

== Plot ==
Fifteen years after the events of If There Be Thorns, Cathy and Chris arrive at the home of their son, Bart, which is oddly an exact replica of Foxworth Hall. While celebrating Bart's twenty-fifth birthday, they meet a man named Joel; he is their uncle, Corrine's brother, who was long thought killed in an avalanche. Joel explains that he was taken to a monastery to recover. He contacted Bart after learning of Corrine's death and now works as the head butler at Bart's request. Joel gives Bart bad information about God and punishment. Bart looks at Joel as a father figure, a fact that troubles Cathy. Bart is still bitter towards his parents for their incestuous relationship, so their stay is not pleasant. He has grown into a handsome young man, but is extremely jealous, power-hungry and resentful that Chris is the guardian of his money until his thirty-fifth birthday.

Bart's brother Jory visits and eventually moves in with his wife. Jory, who is almost thirty, has been married to Melodie, his childhood sweetheart and ballet partner, for nine years. Soon after their arrival, they announce that Melodie is pregnant. Bart is jealous of Jory and shows an unhealthy interest in his wife. Their sister Cindy, who is now sixteen, also arrives. Cathy tries to make the best out of the situation, but any happiness ends when Jory is left paraplegic in an accident. Melodie does not deal well with Jory's disability and withdraws from him. Cathy tries to help Melodie reconnect with Jory but discovers later that she has turned to Bart for comfort and passion – the two have been having an affair.

When Cathy confronts Bart, he says he loves Melodie; Cathy is left unsure what to do. Bart believes Melodie loves him too, but soon realizes it is an empty relationship and he is just a replacement for Jory. Jory finds out about the affair, and although hurt, tries to reconcile with Melodie, but she rejects him. Melodie goes into labor on Christmas Day and gives birth to twins, Darren and Deirdre, who Cathy says resemble her deceased twin brother and sister. Melodie has little interest in the babies and Cathy cares for them, hoping Melodie has postpartum "blues" and will come around. Melodie, not wanting to deal with two children and a disabled husband, abandons Jory and the children and moves to New York City.

Cathy tries to console both her sons and to keep a firm hand on the pretty and free-spirited Cindy. Bart, under Joel's influence, bans Cindy from premarital sex under his roof, physically assaulting two boys he catches Cindy with. When confronted about his hypocrisy a number of times throughout the story, Bart never attempts to justify his actions but instead responds with anger and resentment towards Cathy and Chris, always blaming them for his problems. After a long period of torment from Bart and Joel, Cindy leaves to go to a school in New York.

Cathy and Chris hire a beautiful nurse, Antonia "Toni" Winters, to help Jory recuperate. They hope Toni and Jory will end up together, but Bart begins spending time with Toni and they become lovers. Bart seems happy with Toni and tells Cathy that she loves him. Cathy notices changes in Bart as a result of this relationship, including Bart withdrawing from Joel and being pleasant to Cindy when she comes to visit. Eventually, however, Joel manages to influence Bart again and it sours the relationship. Toni sees Bart's dark side after he becomes possessive of her, and the relationship ends. Soon after, she falls in love with Jory and they begin a relationship, which brings Jory out of the depression that followed his divorce.

Cindy tells Cathy that she ran into Melodie in New York; Melodie remarried immediately after her divorce from Jory and resumed her dancing career. Bart builds a chapel, in which he commands the family to attend Sunday sermons, presided over by Joel. Cathy and Chris become disgusted by the “fire and brimstone" sermons and tell Bart that they will no longer attend. Bart secretly starts bringing the twins to the chapel, which Cathy overhears. She tells Bart to leave the twins alone, also telling Toni never to let them out of her sight unless she knows they are with Jory. After again catching Bart bringing the twins to the chapel, Cathy decides it is time for the family to leave. Cathy tells Bart of her plans, and that while she loves him, she cannot be around the kind of person he has become.

Cathy waits for Chris to come home from work so they can leave, but he instead dies in a hit and run accident; Cathy realizes how similar Chris' death is to that of their father. Bart gives a moving eulogy at Chris' funeral, is remorseful and admits that he really loved Chris and that he was a good father. Cathy is heartsick at the loss of Chris, becoming distant from her family. She comes back for Bart's sake, and they become close. Bart finds his place as a televangelist. He and Cindy make peace and Cathy sees them together singing. Joel has gone back to the monastery to live out his remaining days. Jory and Toni wed, and Toni becomes pregnant. Despite all these good things and the family becoming closer than before, Cathy is still depressed and does not want to live without Chris.

Cathy goes up to the attic and sits by one of the windows and, after decorating the room with paper flowers, dies. As she passes away, she remembers Chris, her mother, grandmother and siblings, and how their innocence was stolen. It is determined that Cathy died of natural causes but implied by the author that she died of a broken heart.

== Characters introduced ==
- Joel Foxworth: Corrine's brother (or half-brother, according to Garden of Shadows), previously mentioned in Flowers in the Attic. Joel was thought to have died during an avalanche but claims he was living at an Italian monastery the whole time. Like John Amos, he fills Bart's head with harmful ideas about God and Hell to gain Bart's trust and part of Bart's inheritance. He dies of cancer.
- Cynthia "Cindy" Sheffield: Cathy and Chris's adopted daughter. Orphaned at two years old in If There Be Thorns after the death of her biological mother, Nicole, a student at Cathy's ballet school. Cindy is described as very beautiful but boy crazy and free-spirited, which often gets her in trouble. She becomes an actress. At the end of the book, Bart and Cindy are seen standing together as brother and sister, finally friends after their troubled childhood and adolescence.
- Antonia 'Toni' Winters: A nurse whom Cathy and Chris hire to take care of Jory. She has a short affair with Bart but breaks up with him after seeing his dark side. She then falls in love with Jory, who is already in love with her, and they get married. She becomes Deirdre and Darren's stepmother, and raises them as her own. At the end of the book, she becomes pregnant and Jory says they plan to name their child Christopher or Catherine, after his parents.
- Deirdre and Darren: Twin children of Jory and Melodie, born on Christmas Day. They resemble Carrie and Cory in appearance and personality, which causes Cathy to sometimes confuse the two sets of twins in her mind. However, unlike their great-aunt and great-uncle, Deirdre and Darren are happy, healthy children beloved by their grandparents. Joel attempts to brainwash them but he is caught before he does real damage.
- Melodie: Jory's first wife and former dance partner. Mother of Deirdre and Darren. She is unable to cope when Jory is injured and left paralyzed. After the accident, she begins having an affair with Bart, whom she uses as a substitute. She divorces Jory and abandons her children to restart her dance career in New York with a new partner whom she marries.
- Trevor: The only servant whom Bart hasn't fired by the end of the book. He finds Cathy's body and letter in the attic.

== Film adaptation ==
The film adaptation premiered on Sunday, April 12, 2015 on Lifetime.
