= Will Kemp (actor, born 1977) =

English actor

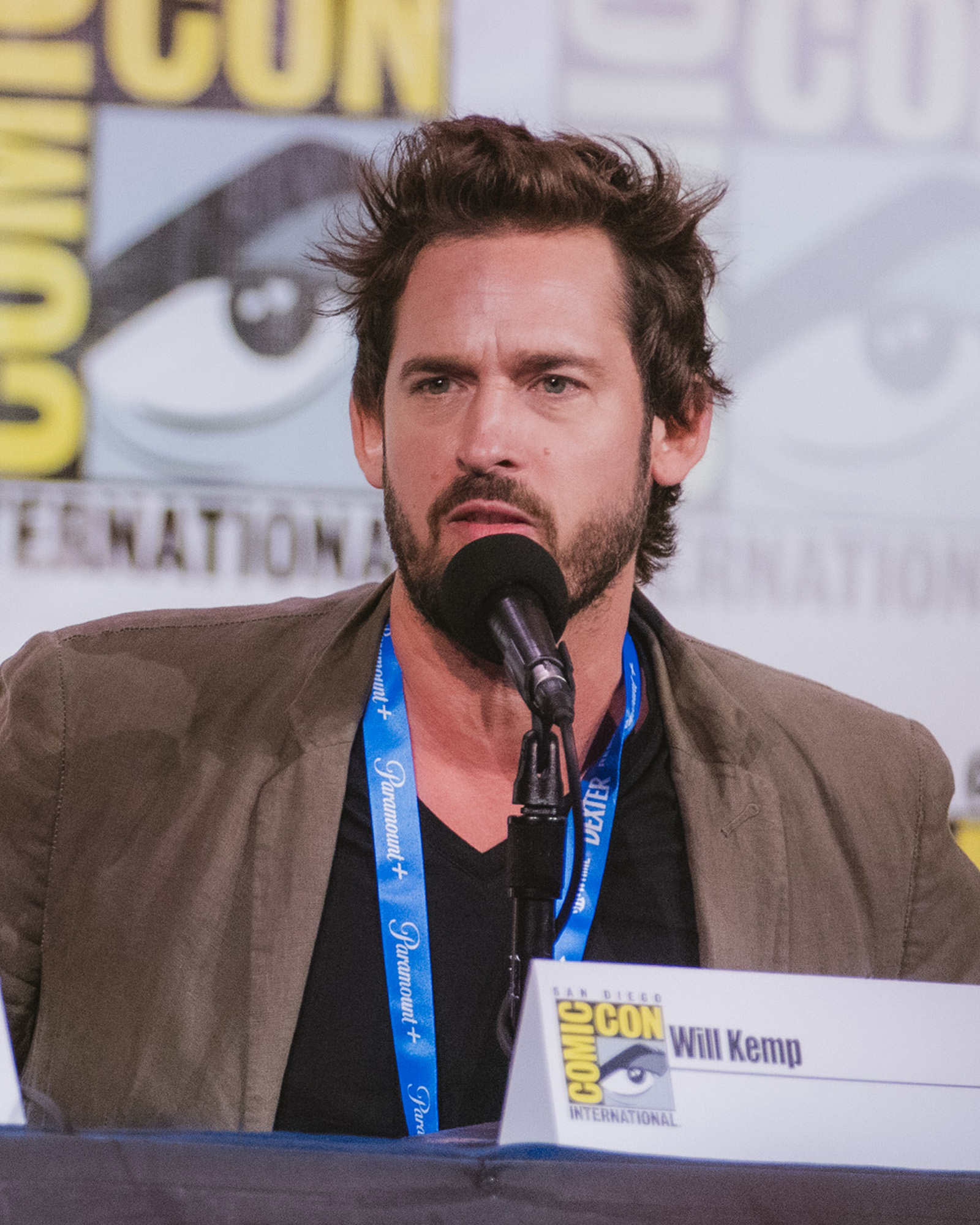
- Kemp in 2025
- Born: William Kemp; 29 June 1977 (age 49); Hertfordshire, England
- Occupations: Actor; dancer
- Years active: 1997–present
- Spouse: Gaby Jamieson
- Children: 2
- Website: www.willkemp.co.uk

William Kemp (born 29 June 1977) is an English actor and dancer. His stage names are Will and James Dean of Ballet.

== Life and career ==
Kemp was born in Hertfordshire, England, to Barry and Rosalind Kemp. He has two younger sisters. Kemp grew up in King’s Langley and schooled at Rudolf Steiner. Trained at the Royal Ballet School, at age 17 he was accepted at dance company Adventures in Motion Pictures (AMP). He won the lead role of The Swan in Matthew Bourne's Swan Lake from 1997 to 2000 in both London and Broadway. In 2002 he appeared in "Stuff Like That" in a Peter Lindbergh-directed commercial for Gap's "For Every Generation" campaign and in 2004, he appeared alongside Sarah Jessica Parker in two Francis Lawrence-directed spots, "Color" and "Shine", for Gap's "How Do You Share It" campaign. He turned down a lucrative modelling contract with Giorgio Armani, citing not wanting to be confused as a model as opposed to an actor as the reason for his decision.

Kemp made his acting debut as Velkan Valerious, a gypsy-prince-turned-werewolf in the 2004 action horror film Van Helsing, opposite Hugh Jackman and Kate Beckinsale. He played the horse Nugget as well as The Young Horseman in the 2007 West End revival of Equus starring Daniel Radcliffe. The part of Nugget required him to don a wire horse mask and metal hooves/horseshoes, and carry Radcliffe on his back while galloping. He had a role in Step Up 2: The Streets as Blake Collins, director of the Maryland School of the Arts (MSA) and brother of Chase Collins. Kemp played a dress up Mr Darcy at an academic conference in the Hallmark Channel's "Loveuary" month-long series featuring Jane Austen adaptations.

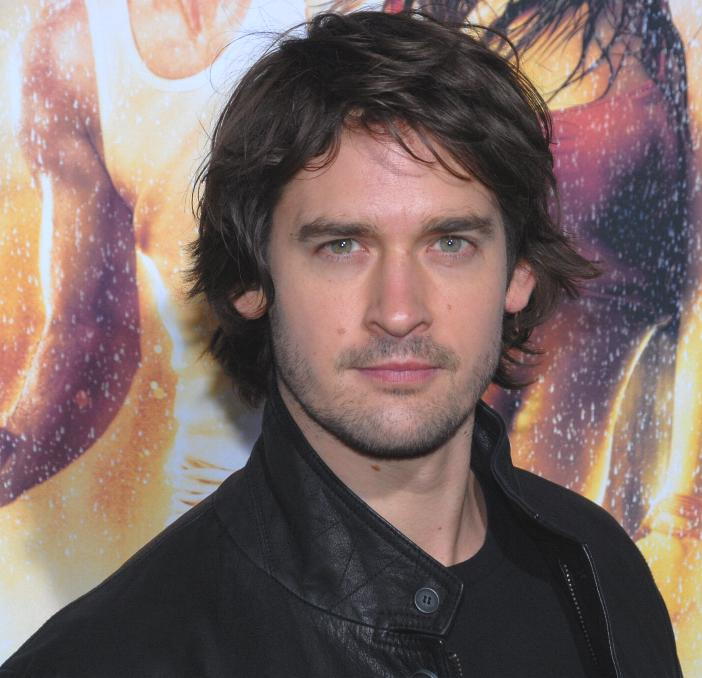
Kemp at the premiere of Step Up 2: The Streets, February 2008

== Personal life ==
Kemp and his wife, Gaby Jamieson, have a daughter, Thalie born in 2005, and a son, Indigo born in 2008.

== Filmography ==
=== Film ===
| Year | Title | Role | Notes |
|---|---|---|---|
| 2004 | Mindhunters | Rafe Perry | |
| 2004 | Van Helsing | Velkan Valerious | |
| 2005 | Brothers of the Head | Celebrity | |
| 2007 | Miguel y William | William Shakespeare | |
| 2008 | Step Up 2: The Streets | Blake Collins | |
| 2013 | The Coin | Ben | Short film |
| 2014 | Petals on the Wind | Julian Marquet | |
| 2015 | The Scorpion King 4: Quest for Power | Drazen | Direct-to-video |
| 2016 | The Midnight Man | Grady | |
| 2017 | Slumber | Tom Arnolds | |
| 2024 | Mythica: Stormbound | The Stranger | |

=== Television ===
| Year | Title | Role | Notes |
|---|---|---|---|
| 1998 | Great Performances | Swan | Episode: "Swan Lake" |
| 2001 | The Car Man | Angelo | Television film |
| 2006 | Pinocchio | Stromboli | Television film |
| 2008 | New Tricks | James Strickland | Episode: "Final Curtain" |
| 2009 | The Prisoner | 23–30 – Wonkers | Miniseries; 2 episodes |
| 2010 | The Soldier's Tale | Narrator / the King | Television film |
| 2011 | Christopher and His Kind | Bobby Gilbert | Television film |
| 2011 | Peter and the Wolf | Grandfather | Television film |
| 2011 | Grace | Nicky | Television film |
| 2011 | Nikita | Nigel | Episode: "London Calling" |
| 2012 | 90210 | Mitchell Nash | 2 episodes |
| 2013 | Kristin's Christmas Past | Jamie | Television film |
| 2013 | Non-Stop | Mark | Television film |
| 2014 | Petals on the Wind | Julian Marquet | Television film |
| 2015–2018 | Girlfriends' Guide to Divorce | Scott | 15 episodes |
| 2017 | Reign | Henry Stuart, Lord Darnley | Main role (season 4) |
| 2018 | Royal Matchmaker | Prince Sebastian | Television film |
| 2019 | Love, Romance and Chocolate | Luc Simon | Television film |
| 2019 | Doom Patrol | Steve Dayton / Mento | Episode: "Doom Patrol Patrol" |
| 2020 | Spinning Out | Mitch Saunders | Main role |
| 2020 | The Christmas Waltz | Roman Davidoff | Television film |
| 2021 | The Princess Switch 3: Romancing the Star | Hunter Cunard | Television film |
| 2022 | Jolly Good Christmas | David Burnside | Television film |
| 2023 | The Dancing Detective: A Deadly Tango | Sebastian Moore | Television film |
| 2023 | A Not So Royal Christmas | Adam | Television film |
| 2024 | Paging Mr. Darcy | Samuel Lee | Television film |
| 2024 | My Sweet Austrian Holiday | Henry | Television film |
| 2026 | Seeking Persephone | Richard Lancaster | Miniseries; 4 episodes |
| 2026 | Toast to Italy | Arrigo | Television film |
