= Flowers in the Attic =

1979 novel by V. C. Andrews

- First edition cover
- Author: V. C. Andrews
- Language: English
- Series: Dollanganger series
- Genre: Gothic horror Family saga
- Publisher: Simon & Schuster
- Publication date: November 1979
- Publication place: United States
- Media type: Print
- Pages: 400
- ISBN: 0-671-82531-3
- OCLC: 21616361
- Followed by: Petals on the Wind (1980)

Flowers in the Attic is a 1979 Gothic novel by V. C. Andrews.

The novel is written in the first person from the point of view of Cathy Dollanganger, describing how she and three siblings were locked in a house and raised under the tyrannical control of their mother and grandmother. It is the first book in the Dollanganger series. The book was extremely popular, selling over 4.5 million copies world wide. Flowers in the Attic was also controversial due to depictions of abuse and sexual content. It was twice adapted into films in 1987 and 2014.

== Plot ==
In 1957, the Dollanganger family—father Christopher, mother Corrine, 14-year-old Chris, 12-year-old Cathy, and four-year-old twins Carrie and Cory—live an idyllic life in Gladstone, Pennsylvania, until Christopher Sr. dies in a car accident, leaving Corrine in debt with no means to support her children.

On the verge of their home being foreclosed, Corrine reveals to the children that as a young woman, her marriage to Christopher so offended her multimillionaire father Malcolm Foxworth that he disinherited her. Now, the elderly Malcolm is dying of heart disease and Corrine intends to return to her childhood home of Foxworth Hall in Virginia to win back his affection in time to be reinstated into his will. Because Malcolm is unaware that Corrine had children by her marriage to Christopher, the children must hide in a secluded upstairs room of the enormous Foxworth Hall until Corrine can break the news to her father. She assures the children that they will only be in the room for a few days.

At Foxworth Hall, Corrine’s mother (called only "the grandmother") locks the children in a bedroom connected to the house's large attic. The grandmother forces Corrine to reveal to her children that the reason for her disinheritance was that Christopher Sr. was Malcolm's younger half-brother, thus Corrine's half-uncle, and that the children are the products of incest. The grandmother believes the children are "the Devil's spawn" and is obsessed with the idea of incest, forbidding all contact between opposite sexes, while prohibiting the children from making noise or opening the room's windows. Only in the attic are they free to play.

Chris and Cathy attempt to make the best of the situation by decorating the attic with paper flowers to create an imaginary garden for the twins. The grandmother comes every morning with a picnic basket filled with the day's food and interrogates the children about their modesty and piety, questions the children are too innocent to understand fully. Initially, Corrine visits several times a day, bringing toys and gifts, but over time her visits become sporadic. After months have passed, Chris and Cathy confront her, as she promised they would be freed in only a few days. Corrine finally confesses that they must remain in the room until their grandfather dies.

A year later, Chris and Cathy have both entered puberty, while the twins are stunted from inadequate nutrition and lack of sunlight. With no other outlets, Chris and Cathy develop a romantic and sexual attraction toward each other, though they do their best to deny their feelings. The grandmother catches Chris staring at a half-dressed Cathy and punishes the children by cutting off their food supply for over two weeks, while they pray their mother will reappear in time to save them. On the verge of starvation, Chris and Cathy decide to escape with the twins to find help. Before they can go, though, the grandmother begins bringing food again, including a rare treat of powdered-sugar doughnuts. Soon afterwards, all the children begin to complain of constant minor illness.

Another year passes. After an absence of several months, Corrine visits the children, explaining that she had been on a European honeymoon with her new husband, Bart Winslow. Chris and Cathy are furious, but fear Corrine will abandon them permanently if they confront her. Realizing that the twins' health is declining, he and Cathy decide to escape. Chris creates a wooden skeleton key. Over the next several months, he and Cathy take turns slipping downstairs to their mother's suite to steal cash and jewelry to fund their lives outside. One night, Cathy comes across her sleeping stepfather and kisses him. When Chris learns of the kiss, he rapes Cathy in a fit of jealousy and rage. Afterwards, he is overcome with remorse, while Cathy feels guilty and conflicted about the act due to her love for Chris.

One of the twins, Cory, becomes deathly ill. Cathy begs Corrine to take him to a hospital, but Corrine hesitates. Enraged, Cathy tells her that if she does not act to save Cory's life, Cathy will reveal their existence to the grandfather. Corrine finally takes Cory away but returns the following morning to inform the children that he died of pneumonia. The children are devastated, with Cathy left wondering if Cory's death is God's punishment for her sexual assault by Chris.

Chris resumes stealing from their mother's rooms, only to discover that Corrine and Bart have left Foxworth Hall permanently. Eavesdropping on the servants, Chris learns that their grandfather died a year ago and that the grandmother has been leaving food contaminated with rat poison in the attic due to a "mouse infestation". He connects this with the doughnuts they are being fed, and realizes that Cory died of arsenic poisoning.

The three remaining children finally leave Foxworth Hall to catch a train to Florida. At the station, Chris reveals that he discovered that Corrine's inheritance is conditional upon her having no children from her first marriage, and Corrine, rather than the grandmother, was the one who most likely poisoned them. Chris and Cathy decide against contacting the authorities, as their main concern is to stay together, but Cathy vows that one day she will make Corrine pay for her crimes.

== Characters ==
- Catherine Leigh "Cathy" Dollanganger: The protagonist and narrator of the novel, Cathy is the second child and older daughter of Christopher and Corrine. She becomes an accomplished ballerina and later a novelist. During their time in the attic, she becomes romantically and sexually attracted to Chris, her brother, and then she falls in love with him.
- Christopher Garland "Chris" Dollanganger, Jr.: The older son and oldest child of Christopher and Corrine. He is an overachiever and later becomes a doctor. During their time in the attic, he becomes romantically and sexually attracted to Cathy, his sister, and then he falls in love with her.
- Cory Dollanganger: Carrie's twin brother and younger brother of Cathy and Chris. The "quiet one" of the twins, Cory is introverted, but musically talented. He becomes ill during their time in the attic and dies from arsenic poisoning at the hands of his mother.
- Carrie Dollanganger: The twin sister to Cory and the younger sister of Cathy and Chris, prior to Cory's death, she is a girly girl, but after Cory dies, she refuses to speak for months.
- Corrine Dollanganger (née Foxworth): The mother of Chris, Cathy, Cory, and Carrie and widow of Christopher Dollanganger, she eventually becomes an antagonist in the story when she tries to kill her children to gain her father's inheritance. She marries her father's attorney, Bart Winslow, later on, and loses interest in her children and late husband.
- Bartholomew "Bart" Winslow: The second husband of Corrine, he is a trophy husband who marries her, thinking that she does not have any children. Cathy is shocked to discover that he is eight years younger than Corrine.
- Olivia Foxworth (née Winfield): The wife of Malcolm Foxworth, she is the grandmother of the Dollanganger children and a cousin of John Amos. Olivia and Malcolm are co-antagonists in this book.
- Malcolm Neal Foxworth: The father of Corrine and grandfather of the Dollanganger children, he is the husband of Olivia. He is described both as having a heart condition and as heartless. He dies during the story, though Chris and Cathy do not learn this until the end. He was also the older half-brother of the children's father.
- Christopher Dollanganger, Sr.: Corrine's first husband, he is the father of the children. He was Malcolm's younger half-brother, making him Corrine's half-uncle. He is described as a wonderful father who could not bear to be separated from his children for longer than five days. He is killed in a car accident on his birthday at the beginning of the book.
- John Amos: A butler to the Foxworth family, he is Olivia's cousin. Chris overhears horrible information from him during one of Chris' expeditions to steal from his mother.

== Reception ==
A review in The Washington Post when the book was released described the book as "deranged swill" that "may well be the worst book I have ever read". The retrospective in The Guardian agreed that it is deranged, but called it "utterly compelling."

=== School book bans ===
The depiction of incest between an adolescent brother and sister in the novel has led to its being banned multiple times. Chariho High School in Rhode Island removed it because it contained "offensive passages concerning incest and sexual intercourse." In 1994, it was removed from the Oconee County, Georgia, school libraries due to "the filthiness of the material."

=== Awards ===
In 1993, Flowers in the Attic was awarded the Secondary BILBY Award. In 2003, the book was listed on the BBC's The Big Read poll of the UK's 200 "best-loved novels."

== Adaptations ==
In 1987, the book was adapted into a film of the same name, starring Louise Fletcher, Victoria Tennant, Kristy Swanson, and Jeb Stuart Adams, and directed by Jeffrey Bloom.

A second adaptation was released on January 18, 2014, on Lifetime, starring Heather Graham as Corrine and Ellen Burstyn as the grandmother, with Kiernan Shipka as Cathy, Mason Dye as Christopher, and directed by Deborah Chow. The film received mixed reviews, but critics praised Ellen Burstyn's performance.

The book was adapted into a stage play by V. C. Andrews's ghostwriter, Andrew Neiderman, in the form of an e-book; it was published by Pocket Star. The stage play was released in October 2014 and is 80 pages long. In August 2015, the stage play received its world premiere production in New Orleans. The play, which received positive reviews, was produced by See 'Em On Stage: A Production Company and was directed by Christopher Bentivegna.

In 2022, the Lifetime network released a television limited series called Flowers in the Attic: The Origin, starring Kelsey Grammer and Kate Mulgrew. The four-episode miniseries is a prequel that focuses on Olivia Foxworth, and is largely based on Garden of Shadows, the fifth novel of the Dollanganger series.

== Historical basis ==
In her pitch letter to her publisher, Andrews claimed that the story behind the novel was "not truly fiction," leading to long-standing rumors that the novel may have been based on true events. For many years, no evidence was found to support this claim, and the book was passed off as fiction. Nonetheless, the official V. C. Andrews website claims to have contacted one of Andrews' relatives. This unidentified relative claimed Flowers in the Attic was loosely based on a faintly similar account. While at the "University of Virginia hospital for treatment... she developed a crush on her young doctor. He and his siblings had been locked away in the attic for over six years to preserve the family wealth."
