= List of Northwestern University faculty =

The following is a partial list of Northwestern University faculty, including current, former, emeritus, and deceased faculty, and administrators at Northwestern University.

== Notable faculty ==
=== Robert R. McCormick School of Engineering and Applied Science ===
- V. S. Subrahmanian, Walter P. Murphy Professor of computer science and Buffet Faculty Fellow
- Jan D. Achenbach, professor emeritus of civil and environmental engineering, engineering sciences and applied mathematics, and mechanical engineering; National Medal of Science
- Luis Amaral, professor of chemical engineering
- Guillermo Ameer, professor of biomedical engineering, surgery
- Vadim Backman, professor of biomedical engineering, medicine (hematology/oncology), biochemistry and molecular genetics
- Ted Belytschko, professor of mechanical engineering, computational mechanics
- Arthur Bronwell, professor of electrical engineering
- Arthur Butz, associate professor of electrical engineering and Holocaust denier
- Justine Cassell, professor of communication studies and electrical engineering and computer science
- Stephen H. Davis, professor of engineering sciences and applied mathematics
- Ken Forbus, computer science and artificial intelligence
- Robert Fourer, professor of industrial engineering and management sciences, designer of AMPL
- Mitra Hartmann, professor of mechanical engineering and biomedical engineering
- Mark Hersam, Walter P. Murphy Professor of materials science and engineering and electrical and computer engineering and chemistry
- Michael Honig, professor of electrical engineering and computer science
- Prem Kumar, professor in the Department of Electrical Engineering and Computer Science, Director of the Center for Photonic Communication and Computing (CPCC) and the AT&T Professor of Information Technology
- Chad Mirkin, professor of chemistry, materials science and engineering, chemical and biological engineering, biomedical engineering
- Milan Mrksich, professor of biomedical engineering, chemistry, cell and molecular biology
- Sandro Mussa-Ivaldi, professor of physiology, physical medicine and rehabilitation, biomedical engineering
- Donald A. Norman, computer science and cognitive science
- Monica Olvera de la Cruz, professor of materials science and engineering, chemistry, chemical and biological engineering, and by courtesy, physics and astronomy
- Joseph Schofer, professor of civil and environmental engineering, director of the Infrastructure Technology Institute, and Associate Dean
- David N. Seidman, Walter P. Murphy Professor emeritus of materials science and engineering
- Samuel I. Stupp, Board of Trustees professor of materials science and engineering, chemistry, medicine, biomedical engineering
- Allen Taflove, professor of electrical engineering
- Ajit Tamhane, professor of industrial engineering and management sciences
- Chris Wolverton, Frank C. Engelhart Professor of materials science and engineering
- Teresa Woodruff, professor of biomedical engineering

=== Medill School of Journalism ===
- Neil Chase, CEO of CalMatters
- Douglas Foster, former editor-in-chief of Mother Jones magazine
- John Lavine, dean
- Jon Petrovich, former CNN and Sony Television executive, founder of CNN.com
- Jacob Scher, late journalist, lawyer and authority on access to public information
- Michele Weldon, author and former managing editor of Northshore magazine

=== School of Communication ===
- TJ Billard, associate professor of communication studies and sociology, founding executive director of the Center for Applied Transgender Studies, and founding editor of the Bulletin of Applied Transgender Studies
- Frank Galati, Tony Award-winning director and professor of performance studies
- Dilip Gaonkar, rhetorical theorist
- Rebecca Gilman, professor and playwright of Spinning into Butter
- Kyle Henry, professor of radio/television/film, independent filmmaker and editor
- E. Patrick Johnson, professor of performance studies
- Eric Patrick, professor of radio/television/film, experimental filmmaker, and 2006 Guggenheim Fellow
- Madhu Reddy, professor
- Todd Rosenthal, Tony Award-winning scenic designer
- Anna Shapiro, professor and director at the Steppenwolf Theatre
- Lynn Spigel, scholar of television and American culture
- Winifred Louise Ward, founded the field of Creative Drama
- James G. Webster, professor and audience researcher
- David Zarefsky, authority on rhetoric and forensics
- Mary Zimmerman, Tony Award-winning director and professor of performance studies

=== School of Professional Studies ===
- Chris Abani, Nigerian author
- Stuart Dybek, writer
- Reginald Gibbons, poet, fiction writer, translator, literary critic, artist
- Ed Roberson, poet

=== Judd A. and Marjorie Weinberg College of Arts and Sciences ===
- J. Michael Bailey, professor of psychology
- Myron L. Bender, professor of chemistry
- Martha Biondi, professor of African American studies
- T.H. Breen, historian of colonial America
- Souleymane Bachir Diagne, professor of African and Islamic philosophy
- Stuart Dybek, author of The Coast of Chicago and I Sailed With Magellan
- Jesús Escobar, professor of art history
- Ward V. Evans, chemist and Oppenheimer security hearing panel member
- Enectalí Figueroa-Feliciano, physicist
- Gary Alan Fine, sociologist of culture
- Benjamin Frommer, historian
- Anupam Garg, physicist, author of Classical Electromagnetism in a Nutshell
- Reginald Gibbons, professor of English and Classics, 2008 National Book Award nominee for poetry
- Robert J. Gordon, economist
- Samuel Goudsmit (1902–1978), Dutch-American physicist
- Jürgen Habermas, contemporary philosopher
- John Hagan, sociologist of crime and human rights
- Leslie M. Harris, professor of African American studies
- Larry V. Hedges, professor of Statistics
- Erich Heller, essayist, philosopher, and literature scholar
- Aleksandar Hemon, author of the National Book Award-nominated The Lazarus Project
- Melville J. Herskovits, anthropologist
- Darlene Clark Hine, historian of African-American women
- Brian M. Hoffman, (bio)chemist
- Bonnie Honig, political theorist
- Daniel Immerwahr, historian
- Vicky Kalogera, astrophysicist, Director of CIERA
- Richard Kieckhefer, professor of Religion, author of Magic in the Middle Ages and Theology in Stone
- Mary Kinzie, professor of English and creative writing, author of A Poet's Guide to Poetry
- Laura Kipnis, professor and author of bestselling Against Love
- Alex Kotlowitz, author of There Are No Children Here and The Other Side of the River
- Richard Kraut, philosopher
- Yanna Krupnikov, political scientist
- Carole LaBonne, professor and chair of Molecular Biosciences
- Jennifer Lackey, professor of philosophy
- Peter Ludlow, John Evans Professor in Moral and Intellectual Philosophy
- Nancy MacLean, historian, author of Behind the Mask of Chivalry
- Yuri Manin, mathematician
- Charles Manski, economist and social policy analyst
- Tobin J. Marks, professor of chemistry
- Charles Mills, philosophy professor
- Chad Mirkin, nanomedicine and chemistry
- Joel Mokyr, historian of science and economics, author of The Lever of Riches
- Richard I. Morimoto, Cell and Molecular Biology
- Aldon Morris, sociologist and author of The Origins of the Civil Rights Movement
- Gary Saul Morson, Russian literature, scholar of Tolstoy and Dostoevsky
- Dale Mortensen, Nobel Prize Laureate in Economics
- Charles Moskos, military sociologist, former advisor to President Bill Clinton
- Adilson E. Motter, physicist
- Edward Muir, Renaissance historian
- Barbara Newman, scholar of Medieval religion and female spirituality
- Monica Olvera de la Cruz, professor of materials science and engineering and professor of chemistry
- Robert Orsi, professor of American religious history
- Ed Paschke, artist and Chicago Imagist
- Mary Pattillo, urban sociologist, named one of Newsweek's "Women of the 21st Century"
- John Pople, late Nobel Prize-winning chemistry professor
- Janice Radway, professor of communications studies
- Mark Ratner, professor of chemistry
- Jennifer Richeson, professor of psychology and MacArthur Fellow
- George C. Schatz, professor of chemistry
- Heidi Schellman, professor of physics and department head at Oregon State University
- Richard Bruce Silverman, professor of chemistry
- Lynn Spigel, Frances Willard Professor of Screen Cultures, cultural history of television
- James Fraser Stoddart, Board of Trustees Professor of Chemistry, Nobel Prize Laureate in Chemistry
- Stuart Struever, anthropologist and archaeologist, former president of the Society for American Archaeology
- Andrei Suslin, mathematician
- Charles Taylor, philosopher, author of Sources of the Self
- Fred W. Turek, Director of the Center for Sleep & Circadian Biology and the Charles & Emma Morrison Professor of Biology in the Department of Neurobiology
- Mayda Velasco, physicist and Director of COFI
- Samuel Weber, Avalon Professor of the Humanities, critical theory
- Irwin Weil, scholar of Soviet history, music, and literature
- Rudolph H. Weingartner, American philosopher and academic administrator, former dean of the college and later provost of the University of Pittsburgh
- Garry Wills, Pulitzer Prize, winning historian and religious scholar
- Eleanor Wilner, poet and editor
- Barry Scott Wimpfheimer, scholar of judaism and Talmudic literature
- Wendy Griswold, sociologist
- Christopher Udry, economist

=== Feinberg School of Medicine ===
- Guillermo Ameer, Professor of Surgery
- Rinad Beidas, Chair and Ralph Seal Paffenbarger Professor of Medical Social Sciences
- Robert Bonow, Max and Lilly Goldberg Distinguished Professor of Cardiology, Professor of Medicine (Cardiology)
- Serdar Bulun, Chair and John J. Sciarra Professor of Obstetrics and Gynecology
- William T. Bovie, Chair, Department of Biophysics
- Daniel Brat, Chair, Department of Pathology, Magerstadt Professor of Pathology
- Sarah A. Connolly, Adjunct Assistant Professor of Microbiology-Immunology
- Nathan Smith Davis, Jr., former Dean
- David Gius, Associate Professor of Radiation Oncology and Pharmacology
- Robert D. Goldman, Chair of the Department of Cell and Molecular Biology
- Eva Gottwein, Associate Professor of Microbiology-Immunology
- Jordan Graffman, Professor of Physical Medicine and Rehabilitation
- Kathleen J. Green, Joseph L. Mayberry Professor of Pathology and Toxicology and Professor of Dermatology
- Maha H. Hussain, Genevieve E. Teuton Professor of Medicine and deputy director of the Lurie Comprehensive Cancer Center at Northwestern University
- Ravi Kalhan, Professor of Preventive Medicine
- Kristen Knutson, Associate Professor of Neurology
- Wyndham Lathem, former Associate Professor of Microbiology-Immunology
- Donald Lloyd-Jones, Chair, Department of Preventive Medicine, Eileen M. Foell Professor, Professor of Preventive Medicine (Epidemiology), Medicine (Cardiology) and Pediatrics
- Laszlo Lorand, professor emeritus in cell and molecular biology
- Constantine Mavroudis, former Willis J. Potts Professor of Surgery.
- Elizabeth M. McNally, Director of the Center for Genetic Medicine, Elizabeth J. Ward Professor of Genetic Medicine Professor of Medicine and Biochemistry and Molecular Genetics
- Chad Mirkin, Director of the International Institute for Nanotechnology and the George B. Rathmann Professor of Chemistry and professor of Medicine
- Michael E. Newcomb, assistant professor and clinical psychologist
- Anna Christina Nobre, adjunct professor of neurology
- Susan Quaggin, Charles Horace Mayo Professor of Medicine, Director of the Feinberg Cardiovascular Research Institute and chief of the Division of Nephrology
- June K. Robinson, Research Professor of Dermatology
- John A. Rogers, Professor of McCormick School of Engineering, Dermatology and Neurological Surgery
- Karla Satchell, Professor of Microbiology-Immunology
- Ali Shilatifard, Robert Francis Furchgott Professor and Chairman of the department of biochemistry and molecular genetics, and the director of the Simpson Query Institute for Epigenetics
- Melissa Simon, George H. Gardner, MD professor of clinical gynecology, vice-chair of clinical research in the Department of Obstetrics and Gynecology, professor of preventive medicine and medical social sciences
- Dinee Simpson, Assistant Professor of Surgery
- Sara Solla, Professor of Neuroscience
- D. James Surmeier, Nathan Smith Davis Professor and Chair in the Department of Neuroscience
- Linda Suleiman, Assistant Dean of Medical Education and Director of Diversity and Inclusion
- Robert L. Sufit, professor of neurology
- Clyde Yancy, Vice Dean for Diversity and Inclusion, Chief of Cardiology in the Department of Medicine, Magerstadt Professor, Professor of Medicine (Cardiology) and Medical Social Sciences
- Phyllis Zee, the Benjamin and Virginia T. Boshes Professor in Neurology, the director of the Center for Circadian and Sleep Medicine (CCSM) and the chief of the Division of Sleep Medicine (neurology)

=== Kellogg School of Management ===
- Donald Haider
- Philip Kotler, author of Marketing Management, named #4 management guru of all time by Financial Times
- Barry Nelson, system simulations
- Stanley Reiter, economics, author of Designing Economic Mechanisms
- Don E. Schultz, marketing and advertising
- Dean Karlan, development economist
- Brian Uzzi, Richard L. Thomas Professor of Leadership. He is best known for his work in the fields of sociology, network science, the science of science, and complex systems.

=== School of Law ===
- Ronald J. Allen, the John Henry Wigmore Professor of Law
- Andrew Koppelman, John Paul Stevens Professor of Law
- Steven Lubet, Edna B. and Ednyfed H. Williams Memorial Professor
- Dorothy Roberts, Kirkland & Ellis Professor of Law, author of Killing the Black Body

=== School of Music ===
- David Bilger, Principal Trumpet, Philadelphia Orchestra
- Peter Martin, jazz pianist
- David McGill, Retired Principal Bassoon, Chicago Symphony Orchestra
- Sherrill Milnes, Retired Professor Emeritus of voice and opera
- Michael Mulcahy, Second Trombone, Chicago Symphony Orchestra and senior lecturer of trombone
- Ursula Oppens, pianist
- Gene Pokorny, Principal Tuba, Chicago Symphony Orchestra
- Thomas Rolfs, Principal Trumpet, Boston Symphony Orchestra
- Michael Sachs, Principal Trumpet, Cleveland Orchestra
- W. Stephen Smith, professor of voice and opera
- Mallory Beth Thompson, Director of Bands and professor of wind conducting
- Amnon Wolman, composer of electronic music
- Gail Williams, brass department chair and professor of horn
- Victor Yampolsky, Director of Orchestral Activities and professor of orchestral conducting
- Jay Alan Yim, composer

=== Other ===
- Ross Atkinson, librarian
- Arthur Charles Lewis Brown, expert on Arthurian legend
- Beth Combs, head women's basketball coach at Northwestern from 2004 to 2008
- Lindsey Durlacher, wrestling coach
- Robert Hess (1938-1994), President of Brooklyn College
- Vladimir Ipatieff, Russian expert on catalysis whose laboratory at Northwest eventually led to the formation of the Center for Catalysis and Surface Science
