= Katherine Green =

Katherine Green may refer to:

- Kate Green (born 1960), British member of parliament
- Kate Green (producer), Canadian film producer
- Katherine Green (screenwriter), see Sugar and Spice (American TV series)
- Katherine Green, first female mayor of Eureka Springs, Arkansas

== See also ==
- Kathe Green (born 1944), American actress, model and singer
- Katy Green (disambiguation)
- Catherine Green (disambiguation)
- Kathryn Greene, French and American photographer
- Katharine Greene Amory (1731–1777), American journalist
- Kathleen J. Green, cell biologist
