= Lathem =

Lathem is a surname. Notable people by that name include:

- Wyndham Lathem (born 1974), former associate professor of microbiology-immunology.
- Lieven van Lathem (1430–1493), early Netherlandish painter and manuscript illuminator.
- Jacob van Laethem (Jacob van Lathem) (1470–1528), Flemish painter.
