= Nu Rho Psi =

National honor society for neuroscience

- ΝΡΨ
- Founded: April 28, 2006; 20 years ago United States
- Type: Honor
- Affiliation: Independent
- Status: Active
- Emphasis: Neuroscience
- Scope: National
- Colors: Gold and Black
- Symbol: Human brain
- Publication: Nu Rho Psi News
- Chapters: 98
- Members: 14,000+ lifetime
- Nickname: NRP
- Headquarters: c/o Dr. Michael Kerchner; Dept. of Psychology; Washington College; 300 Washington Avenue; Chestertown, Maryland 21620; United States
- Website: nurhopsi.org

Nu Rho Psi (ΝΡΨ or NRP) is an American honor society for neuroscience. It was founded in 2006 by the Faculty for Undergraduate Neuroscience and now an independent honor society. Nu Rho Psi is a tax-exempt 501(c)(3) public charity incorporated in the state of Ohio.

== History ==
Nu Rho Psi was founded on April 28, 2006, as an outgrowth of the Faculty for Undergraduate Neuroscience (FUN). It organizing committee included Joe Achor of Baylor University, Shubhik DebBurman of Lake Forest College, Jean Hardwick of Ithaca College, Andy Mickley of Baldwin Wallace University, Ilsun White of Morehead State University, and Eric Wiertelak of Macalester College. The committee created Nu Rho Psi's constitution and by-laws and suggested its insignia.

Nu Rho Psi, The National Honor Society in Neuroscience, was approved by the FUN Council in April 2006. Its purpose is to promote interest in neuroscience, recognize the academic achievement of students, promote career development, encourage community service, and promote interaction between neuroscience students, faculty, and professionals. Mickley served as the society's first executive director.

The first chapter was chartered at Baldwin Wallace College (now Baldwin Wallace University) on November 7, 2006. This was followed by chapters at Baylor University in Dember 2006 and Macalester College in January 2007. In its formative years, the society was governed by the FUN Council, but, as the society grew, FUN decided that Nu Rho Psi would be better served by its own separate council. On February 7, 2011, Nu Rho Psi was incorporated in the state of Ohio. It became an independent tax-exempt [501(c)(3)] public charity on May 12, 2011. Its purpose is educational, charitable, scientific, and social.

The first Nu Rho Psi national council was elected in 2011, with terms starting January 1, 2012.Achor was its first president. Between 2013 and 2016, 29 chapters were chartered. By 2016, the society had grown to 58 chapters with more than 3,000 members. Mickley retired as the society's executive director on November 13, 2016, and was replaced by Mike Kerchner of Washington College.

As of June 2025, it had chartered 98 chapters and had initiated more than 14,000 members.

== Symbols ==
The Greek letters ΝΡΨ (Nu Rho Psi) were selected to represent neuroscience. The Greek letter Ν stands for nous meaning "mind". The letter Ρ stands for rhyesthai, meaning, “to cure”. The letter Ψ stands for psyche, meaning “life.”

In addition, the English pronunciations of the letters also form a pun as they are pronounced similarly to "neurosci", relating to the theme of the society.

Members receive membership certificates and lapel pins. Graduating members may wear honor cords in society's colors, gold and black. Its symbol is the human brain. Its publication is Nu Rho Psi News.

== Membership ==
Membership is by invitation and is open to undergraduate students who majoring or minoring in neuroscience and have completed at least three semesters with an overall 3.2 GPA and nine semester hours of neuroscience-related courses with a 3.5 GPA. Graduate students with a concentration in neurology must have completed at least nine credit hours with a 3.5. GPA. Nu Rho Psi is also open to qualifying neuroscience faculty and alumni of neuroscience programs. Nu Rho Psi membership is for life.

== Activities ==
Nu Rho Psi offers competitive travel awards for members to attend and present their research at the annual Society for Neuroscience meeting. Nu Rho Psi also offers competitive small grants to facilitate member's senior theses or summer research projects. Nu Rho Psi mentors members through publications such as. The Nu Rho Psi Guide to Graduate School in Neuroscience.

As documented in the Nu Rho Psi News, individual Nu Rho Psi chapters organize a variety of service and educational activities throughout the year. Regional vice-presidents provide leadership of the federation of chapters in the region where they reside and represent their region through service on the national council. They are also responsible for promoting Nu Rho Psi activities during the regional undergraduate neuroscience meetings, including the Midwest/Great Lakes Undergraduate Research Symposium in Neuroscience, NEURON (Northeast Under/graduate Research Organization for Neuroscience, SYNAPSE (Symposium for Young Neuroscientists and Professors of the SouthEast), and MIDBRAINS (Midwest Regional Neuroscience Conference). Nu Rho Psi holds an annual National Membership meeting during the Society for Neuroscience conference.

== Chapters ==
Following are the chapters of Nu Rho Psi.

Chapter name	Charter date and range (Note: When the charter date is unknown, the year of the first initiation class is used.)	Institution	Location	Status	Ref.
Gamma in Georgia	2019	Agnes Scott College	Decatur, Georgia	Active	
Zeta in Massachusetts	2021	Assumption University	Worcester, Massachusetts	Active	
Delta in Georgia	2022	Atlanta University Center Consortium (Morehouse College, Spelman College, Clark Atlanta University, and Morehouse School of Medicine)	Atlanta, Georgia	Active	
Alpha in Alabama	2025	Auburn University	Auburn, Alabama	Active	
Alpha in Ohio	November 7, 2006	Baldwin Wallace University	Berea, Ohio	Active	
Alpha in Texas	December 7, 2006	Baylor University	Waco, Texas	Active	
Gamma in Tennessee		Belmont University	Nashville, Tennessee	Active	
Gamma in New York	2014	Binghamton University	Vestal, New York	Active	
Epsilon in Massachusetts	2018	Boston College	Boston, Massachusetts	Active	
Gamma in Massachusetts	2019	Boston University	Boston, Massachusetts	Active	
Zeta in Illinois	2018	Bradley University	Peoria, Illinois	Active	
Mu in Pennsylvania	2025	Bucknell University	Lewisburg, Pennsylvania	Active	
Iota in Pennsylvania	2024	Carlow University	Pittsburgh, Pennsylvania	Active	
Theta in Pennsylvania	2017	Carnegie Mellon University	Pittsburgh, Pennsylvania	Active	
Alpha in Wisconsin	February 2013	Carthage College	Kenosha, Wisconsin	Active	
Theta in Ohio	2024	Case Western Reserve University	Cleveland, Ohio	Active	
Beta in Louisiana	20xx ?	Centenary College of Louisiana	Shreveport, Louisiana	Active	
Alpha in Michigan	2019	Central Michigan University	Mount Pleasant, Michigan	Active	
Alpha in Kentucky	Before 2017	Centre College	Danville, Kentucky	Active	
Beta in Virginia	2013	Christopher Newport University	Newport News, Virginia	Active	
Zeta in Ohio	2017	College of Wooster	Wooster, Ohio	Active	
Alpha in Colorado	2019	Colorado State University	Fort Collins, Colorado	Active	
Delta in Minnesota	2021	Concordia College	Moorhead, Minnesota	Active	
Beta in Connecticut	2016	Connecticut College	New London, Connecticut	Active	
Beta in Nebraska	2019	Creighton University	Omaha, Nebraska	Active	
Beta in Ohio	2008	Denison University	Granville, Ohio	Active	
Eta in Illinois	January 31, 2018	DePaul University	Chicago, Illinois	Active	
Delta in Indiana	20xx ?	DePauw University	Greencastle, Indiana	Active	
Beta in Illinois	2019	Dominican University	River Forest, Illinois	Active	
Alpha in Iowa	2024	Drake University	Des Moines, Iowa	Active	
Alpha in New Jersey	2007	Drew University	Madison, New Jersey	Active	
Zeta in Massachusetts	2023	Emmanuel College	Boston, Massachusetts	Active	
Alpha in Georgia	2011	Emory University	Atlanta, Georgia	Active	
Epsilon in Connecticut	2025	Fairfield University	Fairfield, Connecticut	Active	
Delta in Florida	2022	Florida International University	Westchester, Florida	Active	
Beta in Florida	2017	Florida State University	Tallahassee, Florida	Active	
Epsilon in Virginia	2025	George Mason University	Fairfax County, Virginia	Active	
Alpha in D.C.	2019	George Washington University	Washington, D.C.	Active	
Beta in Georgia	2013	Georgia State University	Atlanta, Georgia	Active	
Epsilon in Minnesota	2015	Gustavus Adolphus College	St. Peter, Minnesota	Active	
Iota in Illinois	2025	Illinois Wesleyan University	Bloomington, Illinois	Active	
Gamma in Indiana	2018	Indiana University Bloomington	Bloomington, Indiana	Active	
Alpha in Maryland	2007	Johns Hopkins University	Baltimore, Maryland	Active	
Alpha in Illinois	2007	Knox College	Galesburg, Illinois	Active	
Gamma in Illinois	2012	Lake Forest College	Lake Forest, Illinois	Active	
Gamma in Iowa	2018	Loras College	Dubuque, Iowa	Active	
Theta in Chicago	2018	Loyola University Chicago	Chicago, Illinois	Active	
Alpha in Minnesota	January 16, 2007	Macalester College	Saint Paul, Minnesota	Active	
Eta in Georgia	2019	Mercer University	Macon, Georgia	Active	
Eta in Massachusetts	202x ?	Merrimack College	North Andover, Massachusetts	Active	
Gamma in Ohio	December 12, 2008	Miami University	Oxford, Ohio	Active	
Alpha in Mississippi	2017	Millsaps College	Jackson, Mississippi	Active	
Delta in Illinois	2019	North Central College	Naperville, Illinois	Active	
Beta in Massachusetts	Before 2015	Northeastern University	Boston, Massachusetts	Active	
Delta in Kentucky	2022	Northern Kentucky University	Highland Heights, Kentucky	Active	
Beta in Florida	2019	Nova Southeastern University	Davie, Florida	Active	
Delta in Ohio	Before 2015	Oberlin College	Oberlin, Ohio	Active	
Epsilon in Ohio	2019	Ohio State University	Columbus, Ohio	Active	
Eta in New York	2024	Pace University	Westchester County, New York	Active	
Alpha in Massachusetts	2008	Pioneer Valley (Smith College and University of Massachusetts Amherst)	Northampton and Amherst, Massachusetts	Active	(Note: Chapter formed at Smith College and expanded to include U Mass Amherst.)
Alpha in Rhode Island	2024	Providence College	Providence, Rhode Island	Active	
Gamma in Connecticut	2020	Quinnipiac University	Hamden, Connecticut	Active	
Delta in Virginia	May 8, 2023	Randolph–Macon College	Ashland, Virginia	Active	
Gamma in Colorado	2021	Regis University	Denver, Colorado	Active	
Alpha in Tennessee	2014	Rhodes College	Memphis, Tennessee	Active	
Beta in New Jersey	2018	Rutgers University–Newark	Newark, New Jersey	Active	
Kappa in Pennsylvania	2019	Saint Francis University	Loretto, Pennsylvania	Active	
Alpha in Missouri	2018	Saint Louis University	St. Louis, Missouri	Active	
Beta in Maryland	2007	St. Mary's College of Maryland	St. Mary's City, Maryland	Active	
Gamma in Minnesota	2019	St. Olaf College	Northfield, Minnesota	Active	
Delta in Tennessee	December 2022	Sewanee: The University of the South	Sewanee, Tennessee	Active	
Beta in New York	2015	Skidmore College	Saratoga Springs, New York	Active	
Iota in Pennsylvania	2020	Slippery Rock University	Slippery Rock, Pennsylvania	Active	
Zeta in New York	2021	State University of New York at Geneseo	Geneseo, New York	Active	
Epsilon in New York	2019	State University of New York at Old Westbury	Old Westbury, New York	Active	
Gamma in New Jersey	2023	Stockton University	Galloway Township, New Jersey	Active	
Delta in Massachusetts	2019	Stonehill College	Easton, Massachusetts	Active	
Epsilon in Pennsylvania	2019	Susquehanna University	Selinsgrove, Pennsylvania	Active	
Delta in New York	2018	Syracuse University	Syracuse, New York	Active	
Delta in Pennsylvania	2019	Temple University	Philadelphia, Pennsylvania	Active	
Eta in Pennsylvania	2019	Thiel College	Greenville, Pennsylvania	Active	
Gamma in Kentucky	2018	Transylvania University	Lexington, Kentucky	Active	
Alpha in Connecticut	2012	Trinity College	Hartford, Connecticut	Active	
Alpha in Louisiana	2019	Tulane University	New Orleans, Louisiana	Active	
Alpha in New York	2019	Union College	Schenectady, New York	Active	
Alpha in Arizona	Before 2017	University of Arizona	Tucson, Arizona	Active	
Beta in California	2019	University of California, Irvine	Irvine, California	Active	
Gamma in California	2020	University of California, Los Angeles	Los Angeles, California	Active	
Eta in Ohio	2018	University of Cincinnati	Cincinnati, Ohio	Active	
Beta in Colorado	2019	University of Colorado Boulder	Boulder, Colorado	Active	
Delta in Connecticut	2020	University of Connecticut	Storrs, Connecticut	Active	
Alpha in Delaware	2019	University of Delaware	Newark, Delaware	Active	
Alpha in Indiana	2019	University of Evansville	Evansville, Indiana	Active	
Epsilon in Georgia	Before 2016	University of Georgia	Athens, Georgia	Active	
Epsilon in Illinois	2019	University of Illinois Chicago	Chicago, Illinois	Active	
Delta in Iowa	2018	University of Iowa	Iowa City, Iowa	Active	
Alpha in Kansas	2018	University of Kansas	Lawrence, Kansas	Active	
Beta in Kentucky	Before March 2017	University of Kentucky	Lexington, Kentucky	Active	
Gamma in Maryland	2022	University of Maryland, College Park	College Park, Maryland	Active	
Alpha in Florida	2019	University of Miami	Coral Gables, Florida	Active	
Gamma in Michigan	2025	University of Michigan	Ann Arbor, Michigan	Active	
Alpha in Nebraska	January 15, 2013	University of Nebraska Omaha	Omaha, Nebraska	Active	
Alpha in Nevada	2019	University of Nevada, Reno	Reno, Nevada	Active	
Alpha in New Hampshire	2018	University of New Hampshire	Durham, New Hampshire	Active	
Alpha in North Carolina	2021	University of North Carolina at Chapel Hill	Chapel Hill, North Carolina	Active	
Beta in Indiana	2018	University of Notre Dame	Notre Dame, Indiana	Active	
Gamma in Pennsylvania	2019	University of Pennsylvania	Philadelphia, Pennsylvania	Active	
Zeta in Pennsylvania	2019	University of Pittsburgh	Pittsburgh, Pennsylvania	Active	
Beta in Minnesota	2007	University of St. Thomas	Saint Paul, Minnesota	Active	
Alpha in Pennsylvania	2006	University of Scranton	Scranton, Pennsylvania	Active	
Alpha in California	2019	University of Southern California	Los Angeles, California	Active	
Beta in Tennessee	Before 2017	University of Tennessee	Knoxville, Tennessee	Active	
Beta in Texas	2023	University of Texas at Austin	Austin, Texas	Active	
Alpha in Virginia	2020	University of Virginia	Charlottesville, Virginia	Active	
Alpha in Vermont	2019	University of Vermont	Burlington, Vermont	Active	
Beta in Pennsylvania	2009	Ursinus College	Collegeville, Pennsylvania	Active	
Gamma in Virginia	2018	Virginia Tech	Blacksburg, Virginia	Active	
Beta in Iowa	2019	Wartburg College	Waverly, Iowa	Active	
Beta in Michigan	2020	Wayne State University	Detroit, Michigan	Active	
Alpha in Utah	2015	Weber State University	Ogden, Utah	Active	
Zeta in Georgia	2019	Wesleyan College	Macon, Georgia	Active	
Beta in Utah	2020	Westminster University	Salt Lake City, Utah	Active	

== Governance ==
The society is managed by a member-elected national council consisting of student and faculty volunteers from many colleges and universities throughout the United States. Members of the national council are elected by the Nu Rho Psi membership. Its officers include president, immediate past president, secretary, treasurer, regional vice president Northeast, regional vice president Midwest, regional vice president South, regional vice president West, social media chair, executive director, and immediate past executive director. Its headquarters is based at Washington College in Chestertown, Maryland.

== Notable members ==
Notable honorary members include

- the 14th Dalai Lama (Macalester College)
- Stephen Ainlay (Union College)
- Joanne Berger-Sweeney (Trinity College)
- Mitra Hartmann (Northwestern University)
- Joseph E. LeDoux (Trinity College)
- Eric J. Nestler (Oberlin College)
- Bruce McEwen (Rockefeller University)
- Bennet Omalu (University of Evansville)
- Philip Rubin (Trinity College)
- Robert Sapolsky (Baldwin Wallace University)
- Larry Squire (University of California - San Diego)
