= William Goldman (disambiguation) =

William Goldman (1931–2018) was an American novelist, playwright and screenwriter.

William or Bill Goldman may also refer to:

- William Goldman (photographer) (1856–1922), American photographer
- William Goldman (mathematician) (born 1955), American mathematician
- Bill Goldman (microbiologist), American microbiologist
