= Katy Green =

Katy, Katie or Kate Green may refer to:

- Katy Green (rugby union) (born 1985), Scottish rugby union player
- Katy Green (figure skater), American ice dancer in 1999 U.S. Junior Figure Skating Championships
- Katie Green (born 1987), British model
- Katie Green (rugby league) (born 1996), Australian rugby league player
- Kate Green (born 1960), British politician
- Kate Green (producer), Canadian film producer

== See also ==
- Katie Hall (American politician) (born Katie Beatrice Green, 1938–2012), American politician
- Katherine Green (disambiguation)
- Catherine Green (disambiguation)
