= NarcoLeap =

Canadian web series

- Genre: Drama
- Created by: Kate Green
- Based on: Original Concept by Donald Auger
- Written by: David Schmidt; Donald Auger; Kate Green; Jon Cooksey
- Directed by: Kate Green
- Starring: Chelsey Reist; Madison Smith; Austin Eckert; Nicole Oliver; Aleks Paunovic; Cameron Bancroft; Nhi Do
- Country of origin: Canada
- No. of seasons: 2
- No. of episodes: 14

Production
- Executive producers: Kate Green; David Schmidt
- Producers: Kate Green; Emily Keller; Ross Vivian
- Camera setup: Single-camera
- Running time: 8-11 minutes

Original release
- Release: July 15, 2018 – November 20, 2020

Narcoleap is a Canadian web series created by Kate Green. The series stars Chelsey Reist, Madison Smith, Austin Eckhert, Nicole Oliver, Aleks Paunovic, Cameron Bancroft, and Nhi Do, and is loosely based on the original concept by Donald Auger. Narcoleap tells the story of college student Kelsey Atkins, who unexpectedly begins to leap into the bodies of other people during her bouts of narcolepsy, which leads her to become a target in the deadly world of military espionage. The series premiered on YouTube on July 15, 2018, and was then released across Canada simultaneously on TELUS Optik TV, and CBC GEM on August 1, 2018. Season one of Narcoleap was proudly funded by the Independent Production Fund, TELUS STORYHIVE, and Creative BC, and was developed through the Women In The Director's Chair (WIDC) program. Season two of Narcoleap, distributed by HG Distribution, premiered on Highball TV on November 8, 2020. Season two was proudly funded by the Canada Media Fund, and the Bell Media Fund.

== Plot ==
Kelsey Atkins has never been very remarkable. Things don't get any easier when her persistent teenage lethargy escalates into full blown narcolepsy. Her dreams are always different but have a recurring theme; being trapped in someone else's body. With the help of her only friend Aidan Webb, she investigates what is happening to her only to learn that she is commandeering the bodies of real people across the globe. Kelsey's ability is something the military wants to use as part of a covert operation turning people that can astral project into assassins. Operation lead, Colonel Slater sends out agent Miles Kirkland to bring Kelsey in for testing. It isn't long before Kelsey is on the run fighting to stay alive and to stay awake.

== Episodes ==
The first season of Narcoleap consists of 8 episodes. All episodes were simultaneously released on July 15, 2018. Season two of Narcoleap consists of 6 episodes. All episodes were simultaneously released on December 20, 2020.

== Cast and characters ==
=== Main characters ===
- Kelsey Atkins (played by Chelsey Reist) was diagnosed with stress-induced narcolepsy as a child, shortly after her parents separated. These two major events occurring at such a vulnerable age caused Kelsey to withdraw socially, turning her into something of a loner for most of her formative years. Always a bright student, Kelsey succeeded in winning a much-needed scholarship for college, where she is currently studying marketing and communications. Determined to at least attempt to break out of her social shell in college, Kelsey has managed to strike up a friendship with fellow student Aidan Webb – though she is unaware that Aidan has a major crush on her. For although she's pretty and fit, Kelsey still feels that her narcolepsy makes her an undesirable outcast. And when, during her narcoleptic events, Kelsey begins to experience the sensation that she's “leaping” into other people's bodies, her sense of being an outsider will increase exponentially. Alarmed by what's happening to her, Kelsey leans on her one true friend more than ever when she learns she's being tracked by a secret government project that uses people with astral projection abilities to perform espionage around the globe.
- Aidan Webb (played by Madison Smith) is a business administration student at the same college attended by Kelsey, Aidan is offbeat, with an amusing charm. Delighted when Kelsey begins to express interest in him as a friend, Aidan hopes that their friendship will blossom into a romance one day soon. Always of the mindset that Kelsey's narcolepsy simply makes her more interesting, Aidan will surprise both Kelsey and himself with his resourcefulness and loyalty when Kelsey's “leaps” plunge them into an ever more dangerous world. Unfortunately for Aidan, Kelsey's astral projection experiences will bring her into the orbit of a rival love interest.
- Miles Kirkland (played by Austin Eckhert) initially deceives Kelsey by pretending to be a PhD student co-leading a study on astral projection. But Miles is in fact a lieutenant in the military, involved in a top secret government project using astral projection to perform espionage around the world. Miles is the project's top field operative, deploying his diverse and expert skills to assist astral projection (A.P.) agents in their missions. When Kelsey's leaps bring her to the attention of the project, Miles is sent to track down the “rogue” A.P., and to assess and recruit her into the program – by any means necessary. As trained as he is for any eventuality, Miles is still caught unprepared when he begins to develop feelings for Kelsey.
- Helen Atkins (played by Nicole Oliver) is Kelsey's mother, and has had to raise her daughter as a single, working mom since Kelsey was young. Married at twenty to her high school sweetheart, Helen and Kelsey's father separated just a few years later. Helen has bounced from job to job ever since, struggling to provide for herself and Kelsey, whose dad hasn't been heard from in years. Helen treasures Kelsey and would do anything for her – though she often doesn't realize that she's the number one source of stress in Kelsey's life, which triggers her daughter's narcolepsy.
- Colonel Slater (played by Aleks Paunovic) is a highly decorated soldier, hailing from a long line of military professionals. Slater is in command of the day-to-day operations of the military's secret astral projection project. Proud to helm this ground-breaking espionage initiative, Slater has recruited an elite team of scientists, technicians, A.P. agents and non-A.P. field operatives to undertake their mission assignments. A strong leader, Slater knows that success requires more than a by-the-book approach; with technology this cutting-edge, outside-the-box thinking is a necessity. That's why Slater allows trusted personnel like Miles leeway in executing their missions. But make no mistake: Slater is as hard as iron, and firmly believes that, in an increasingly volatile world, ruthlessness and cunning are required in order to keep his country safe from foreign threats. It's also why Slater continually lobbies to increase the size and scope of the project and its missions.

== Reception ==
Narcoleap has garnered over 300,000 channel views and a social media ad reach of 2.4 million creating 181,3000 total organic views. The series has also received numerous award nominations and wins at prestigious film awards and festivals.

=== Awards ===
Year	Award	Category	Result
2019	Miami Web Fest	Best Sci-Fi	Won
2019	Canadian Screen Awards	Best Web Program or Series, Fiction	Nominated
2019	Writers Guild of Canada Awards	Shorts and Webseries; David Schmidt	Nominated
2019	Leo Awards	Best Performance by a Female in a Web Series; Chelsey Reist	Nominated
2019	Leo Awards	Best Performance by a Male in a Web Series; Madison Smith	Nominated
2019	Leo Awards	Best Performance by a Male in a Web Series; Aleks Paunovic	Nominated
2019	Toronto Web Fest	Best Sci-Fi	Nominated
2018	Asia Web Fest	Best Sci-Fi	Won
2018	Baltimore Web Fest	Best Sci-Fi Writing	Won
2018	Tuscany Web Fest	Best VFX	Won
2018	UK Web Fest	Best Director	Nominated
2018	Minnesota Web Fest	Best Sci-Fi/Fantasy	Nominated
