= Prooftexts (journal) =

- Discipline: Jewish literature
- Language: English
- Edited by: Barry Wimpfheimer; Wendy Zierler

Publication details
- History: 1981–present
- Publisher: Indiana University Press (United States)
- Frequency: Triannually

Standard abbreviations
- ISO 4: Prooftexts

Indexing
- ISSN: 0272-9601 (print); 1086-3311 (web)
- LCCN: 81644077
- JSTOR: 02729601
- OCLC no.: 795958492

Links
- Journal homepage; Online archive at Project MUSE

Prooftexts: A Journal of Jewish Literary History is a triannual peer-reviewed academic journal in the field of Jewish literature. It was established in 1981 and is published by Indiana University Press. The editors-in-chief are Barry Scott Wimpfheimer (Northwestern University) and Wendy Zierler (Hebrew Union College).

== Abstracting and indexing ==
The journal is abstracted and indexed in:

- Arts & Humanities Citation Index
- Current Contents/Arts & Humanities
- EBSCO databases
- Index Islamicus
- MLA Bibliography
- ProQuest databases
- Religious and Theological Abstracts
