= Catherine Green (disambiguation) =

Catherine Green (1881–1965) was an Australian politician.

Catherine Green(e) may also refer to:

- Catherine M. Green, English biologist
- Catherine Green (Winnipeg South), New Democratic Party candidate
- Catherine E. Greene (born 1960), Irish sculptor
- Catharine Littlefield Greene (1755–1814), wife of general Nathanael Greene
- Catherine Green (equestrian) in FEI World Cup Jumping 2010/2011

== See also ==
- Katherine Green (disambiguation)
- Katy Green (disambiguation)
