= Ajit Tamhane =

Researcher

Ajit C. Tamhane
- Occupations: Professor, author and researcher
- Awards: Fellow, American Statistical Association; Fellow, Institute of Mathematical Statistics; Fellow, American Association for Advancement of Science; Elected member, International Statistical Institute; Distinguished Alumnus Award, I.I.T. Bombay

Academic background
- Education: B. Tech (First Class Honors) Mechanical Engineering; Ph.D., M.S. Statistics
- Alma mater: Indian Institute of Technology, Bombay, India; Cornell University, Ithaca, NY

Ajit C. Tamhane is a professor in the Department of Industrial Engineering and Management Sciences (IEMS) at Northwestern University and also holds a courtesy appointment in the Department of Statistics.

Tamhane has published over 100 research articles in refereed journals and has authored four books and co-edited two volumes of collected research papers. His research primarily focuses on multiple testing in clinical trials. He has also worked extensively in other areas of statistics including design of experiments, ranking and selection procedures, chemometrics, clustering methods and statistical inference.

Tamhane is a fellow of the American Statistical Association, the Institute of Mathematical Statistics, the American Association for Advancement of Science and an elected member of the International Statistical Institute.

== Education ==
Tamhane studied at the Indian Institute of Technology Bombay, and received his B.Tech. in Mechanical Engineering in 1968. He moved to the United States in 1970, earning his Ph.D. in Operations Research and Statistics from Cornell University in 1975 under the supervision of Robert E. Bechhofer.

== Career ==
Following his Doctoral Degree, Tamhane joined the IEMS Department at Northwestern University in 1975 as an assistant professor, and was promoted to Associate Professor in 1979, and to Professor in 1987. During 1982–83, he was on sabbatical leave at Cornell University. Since 1986 he has been a faculty member in the Department of Statistics when that department was established.

Tamhane also held several administrative appointments in his career. He held appointment as a Chair of the IEMS Department from 2001 to 2008 and Senior Associate Dean of the McCormick School of Engineering and Applied Science from 2008 to 2018.

== Research ==
Tamhane's research falls in the areas encompassing, multiple testing in clinical trials, ranking and selection procedures, design of experiments, chemometrics, statistical inference and clustering methods. His research in these areas has been supported by National Science Foundation, National Institutes of Health and National Security Agency. He is the author of several books, including Statistics and Data Analysis: From Elementary to Intermediate, Statistical Analysis of Designed Experiments, Predictive Analytics: Parametric Models for Regression and Classification Using R, and Multiple Comparison Procedures. He has also edited two volumes of collected papers: Design of Experiments: Ranking and Selection (with Thomas Santner) published by Marcel Dekker (1984) and Multiple Testing Problems in Pharmaceutical Statistics (with Alex Dmitrienko and Frank Bretz) published by Chapman & Hall (2010).

=== Multiple comparisons ===
Tamhane provided and explored several test procedures for the identification of the minimum effective and maximum safe doses of a drug (MINED and MAXSD). He also studied the usage of adaptive extensions of a two-stage group sequential procedure (GSP) in terms of testing primary and secondary endpoints, and discussed different ways to modify the boundaries of the original group sequential procedure to control the familywise error rate, and also provided power comparisons between competing procedures along with clinical trial examples. In his paper published in 2011, he defined classes of parallel gatekeeping procedures. Results of his study indicated an improvement in power of multistage gatekeeping procedures by the usage of α-exhaustive tests for the component procedures. Eric Peritz reviewed Tamhane's book entitled, Multiple Comparison Procedures, as "a comprehensive monograph" in which "the control of familywise error rates is given the lion's share in the book."

=== Design of experiments for selection and multiple testing problems ===
Tamhane's early work, emanating from his Doctoral Dissertation, was on two-stage and multi-stage screening type procedures for selecting the best treatment. He studied the design of such procedures, focusing on the sample size requirements. For the problem of testing multiple treatments with a common control, he generalized the classical balanced incomplete block (BIB) designs to what are called balanced treatment incomplete block (BTIB) designs.

=== Chemical engineering applications, quality control and data mining ===
In his study regarding chemical engineering applications, Tamhane proposed a novel nonparametric regression method for high-dimensional data, nonlinear partial least squares (NLPLS), and implemented it with feedforward neural networks. He further determined the performances of NLPLS, projection pursuit, and neural networks in the context of response variable predictions and robustness to starting values. He also conducted multiple studies regarding the detection of gross errors in process data in chemical process networks.

== Awards and honors ==
- 1985 - Youden Award for the best expository paper published in Technometrics
- 1991 - Fellow, American Statistical Association
- 2010 - Fellow, Institute of Mathematical Statistics
- 2013 - Fellow, American Association for Advancement of Science
- 2015 - Elected member, International Statistical Institute
- 2017 - Distinguished Alumnus Award, I.I.T. Bombay

== Bibliography ==
=== Books ===
- Multiple Comparison Procedures (1987) ISBN 9780471822226
- Statistics and Data Analysis: From Elementary to Intermediate (2000) ISBN 9780137444267
- Statistical Analysis of Designed Experiments: Theory and Applications (2009) ISBN 9780471750437
- Predictive Analytics: Parametric Models for Regression and Classification Using R (2020) ISBN 9781118948897

=== Selected articles ===
- Dunnett, C. W., & Tamhane, A. C. (1992). A step-up multiple test procedure. Journal of the American Statistical Association, 87(417), 162–170.
- Tamhane, A. C., Dunnett, C. W., Green, J. W., & Wetherington, J. D. (2001). Multiple test procedures for identifying the maximum safe dose. Journal of the American Statistical Association, 96(455), 835–843.
- Tamhane, A. C., & Logan, B. R. (2002). Multiple test procedures for identifying the minimum effective and maximum safe doses of a drug. Journal of the American Statistical Association, 97(457), 293–301.
- Dmitrienko, A., & Tamhane, A. C. (2009). Gatekeeping procedures in clinical trials. In Multiple Testing Problems in Pharmaceutical Statistics (pp. 183–210). Chapman and Hall/CRC.
- Tamhane, A. C., Mehta, C. R., & Liu, L. (2010). Testing a primary and a secondary endpoint in a group sequential design. Biometrics, 66(4), 1174–1184.
- Gou, J., Tamhane, A. C., Xi, D., & Rom, D. (2014). A class of improved hybrid Hochberg–Hommel type step-up multiple test procedures. Biometrika, 101(4), 899–911.
- Tamhane, A. C., Wu, Y., & Mehta, C. R. (2012). Adaptive extensions of a two-stage group sequential procedure for testing primary and secondary endpoints (I): unknown correlation between the endpoints. Statistics in Medicine, 31(19), 2027–2040.
- Tamhane, A. C., & Gou, J. (2018). Advances in p-value based multiple test procedures. Journal of Biopharmaceutical Statistics, 28(1), 10–27.
- Tamhane, A. C., Gou, J., Jennison, C., Mehta, C.R. & Curto, T. (2018) A gatekeeping procedure for testing a primary and a secondary endpoint in a group sequential design with multiple interim looks. Biometrics, 74(1), 40–48.
- Tamhane, A. C., Xi, D., & Gou, J. (2021) Group sequential Holm and Hochberg procedures. Statistics in Medicine, published online http://doi.org/10.1002/sim.9128.
