= Chris Wolverton =

American materials scientist

Christopher Wolverton
- Other name: Chris Wolverton
- Education: University of Texas at Austin (BS); University of California, Berkeley (PhD)
- Known for: Open Quantum Materials Database (OQMD)
- Awards: Materials Research Society Theory Award (2025)
- Scientific career
- Fields: Computational materials science Materials informatics
- Workplaces: Northwestern University; Ford Motor Company; National Renewable Energy Laboratory
- Thesis: Ground-State Properties and Phase Stability of Binary and Ternary Intermetallic Alloys (1993)
- Doctoral advisor: Didier de Fontaine
- Website: Official website

Christopher Wolverton (commonly known as Chris Wolverton) is an American materials scientist who is the Frank C. Engelhart Professor of Materials Science and Engineering at Northwestern University. He is known for his work in high-throughput density functional theory (DFT) calculations, computational materials design, and for founding the Open Quantum Materials Database (OQMD), a large open database of computed materials properties used worldwide for materials discovery. His research spans batteries, hydrogen storage, thermoelectrics, and other energy-related materials, often combining first-principles calculations with machine learning and materials informatics.

In 2025, Wolverton received the Materials Research Society (MRS) Theory Award for his contributions to computational materials theory and high-throughput approaches to materials discovery.

== Education and career ==
Wolverton received his B.S. degree in physics, summa cum laude, from the University of Texas at Austin and his Ph.D. in physics from the University of California, Berkeley. He subsequently carried out postdoctoral research at the National Renewable Energy Laboratory (NREL), working on computational approaches to energy-related materials.

After his postdoctoral work, he joined the Research and Innovation Center at Ford Motor Company, where he led a group on hydrogen storage and nanoscale modeling and worked on computational alloy design and phase stability in structural materials. He later joined the Department of Materials Science and Engineering at Northwestern University, where he holds the Frank C. Engelhart Professorship and leads a research group in computational materials science.

== Research ==
Wolverton's research focuses on using first-principles quantum-mechanical calculations and large-scale computational screening to predict materials properties and to guide the discovery of new compounds before experimental synthesis. His work includes:

- Development of the Open Quantum Materials Database (OQMD), containing millions of DFT-computed materials entries that enable data-driven search for new compounds and phases.
- Application of convex-hull stability analysis and phase-diagram calculations to identify thermodynamically stable and metastable materials.
- Design of cathode materials and coatings for lithium-ion batteries, including Li-rich layered oxides, solid-electrolyte compatible coatings, and high-energy electrode chemistries.
- Computational discovery and optimization of thermoelectric materials with low lattice thermal conductivity and high power factors.
- Use of machine learning and materials informatics to analyze large materials datasets, screen structure–property relationships, and accelerate the search for functional materials.

According to Google Scholar, his publications have been cited tens of thousands of times and he has an h-index over 100.

== Awards and honors ==
- Materials Research Society Theory Award (2025), for contributions to computational materials theory and high-throughput materials discovery.
- Ford Motor Company Technical Achievement Award (2006)
- USCAR Recognition Award (2006)
- Ford Motor Company Patent Awards (2002, 2005)
- Ford Environmental, Physical Sciences, and Safety Research Recognition Award (2003)
- Fellow of the American Physical Society (APS)
- Fellow of ASM International
- ISI Highly Cited Researcher (2019–present).

== Selected publications ==
- Saal, J. E.; Kirklin, S.; Aykol, M.; Meredig, B.; Wolverton, C. "Materials design and discovery with high-throughput density functional theory: The Open Quantum Materials Database (OQMD)." JOM 65, 1501–1509 (2013).
- Hegde, V. I.; Aykol, M.; Kirklin, S.; Wolverton, C. "The phase stability network of all inorganic materials." Science Advances 6, eaay5606 (2020).
- Chen, P. C.; Liu, M.; Du, J. S.; Meckes, B.; Wang, S.; Lin, H.; Dravid, V. P.; Wolverton, C.; Mirkin, C. A. "Interface and heterostructure design in polyelemental nanoparticles." Science 363, 959–964 (2019).
- Ren, F.; Ward, L.; Williams, T.; Laws, K. J.; Wolverton, C.; Hattrick-Simpers, J.; Mehta, A. "Accelerated discovery of metallic glasses through iteration of machine learning and high-throughput experiments." Science Advances 4, eaaq1566 (2018).
- Kim, S.; Aykol, M.; Hegde, V. I.; Lu, Z.; Kirklin, S.; Croy, J. R.; Thackeray, M. M.; Wolverton, C. "Material design of high-capacity Li-rich layered-oxide electrodes." Energy & Environmental Science 10, 2201–2211 (2017).
- Hill, J.; Mulholland, G.; Persson, K.; Seshadri, R.; Wolverton, C.; Meredig, B. "Materials science with large-scale data and informatics." MRS Bulletin 41, 399–409 (2016).
