= Lynn Spigel =

Lynn Spigel is the Frances E. Willard Professor of Screen Cultures at the School of Communication at Northwestern University. She has written extensively on numerous topics including post-war culture and popular media. She has also edited numerous anthologies including Television after TV (Duke University Press, 2004) and Feminist TV Criticism (McGraw Hill, 2007). She is the editor of the Console-ing Passions book series from Duke University Press.

Spigel was named a Guggenheim Fellow in 2012 for a project to study the history of smart homes and digital technologies for everyday life.

== Publications ==
- TV by Design: Modern Art and the Rise of Network Television (University of Chicago Press, 2008, ISBN 0-226-76968-2)
- Welcome to the Dreamhouse: Popular Media and Postwar Suburbs (Duke University Press, 2001, ISBN 0-8223-2696-5)
- Make Room for TV: Television and the Family Ideal in Postwar America (University of Chicago Press, 1992, ISBN 0-226-76967-4)
