= Michele Weldon =

Author, journalist, keynote speaker and assistant professor (born 1958)

Michele Christine Weldon
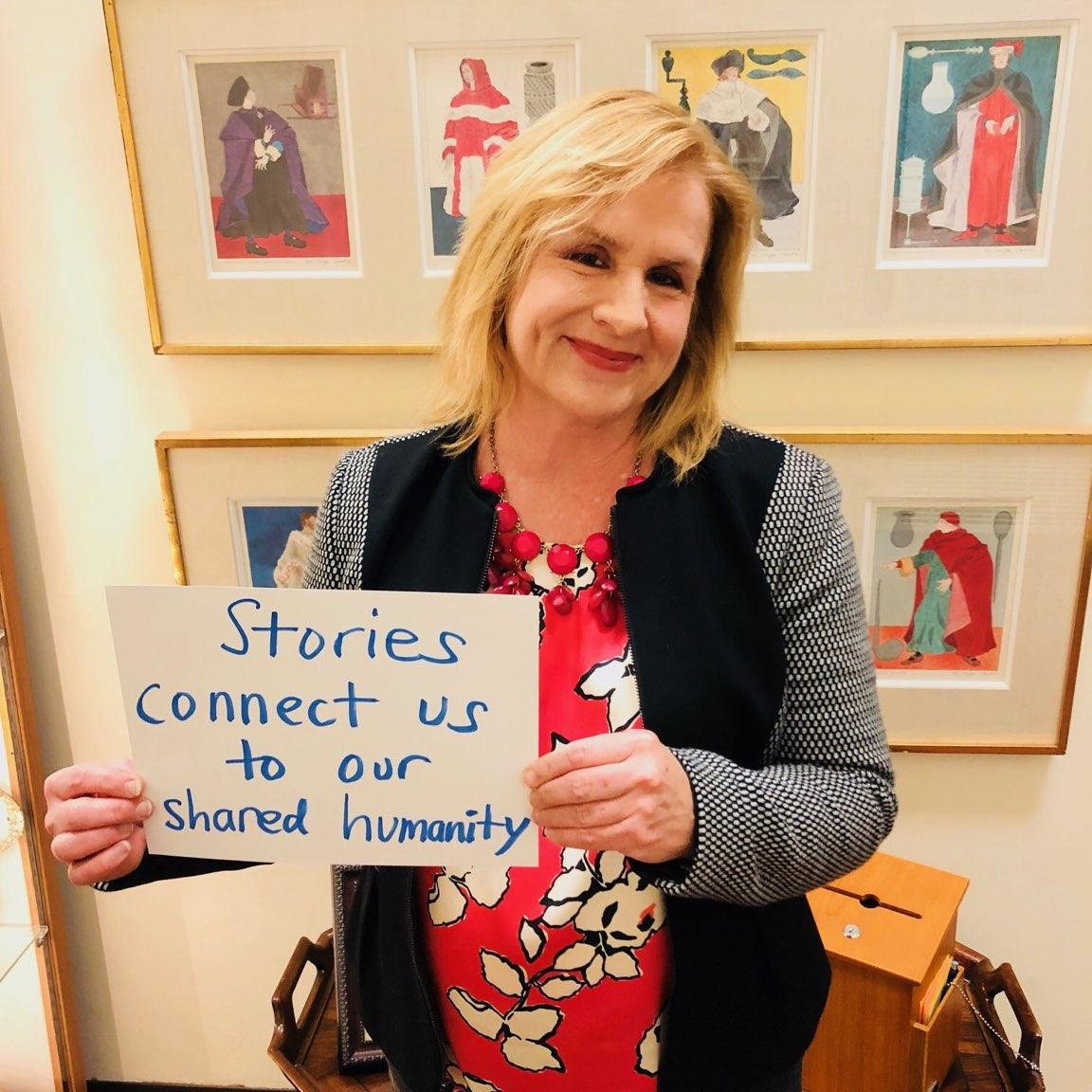
- Born: 1958 (age 67–68); Oak Park, Illinois
- Education: Northwestern University
- Occupations: journalist, professor, essayist, memoirist, speaker
- Writing career
- Language: English
- Genres: memoir, essay
- Notable awards: 2015 Editors Choice, Booklist; 2009 Nonfiction price, National Federation of Press Women; 2000 Bread and Roses Individual Courage Award in Publishing, Chicago

Michele Weldon (born 1958) is an American author, journalist, keynote speaker, and assistant professor at Northwestern University's Medill School of Journalism.

== Education ==
Michele Weldon received both her BSJ (1979) and MSJ (1980) at Northwestern University’s Medill School of Journalism.

== Career ==
She began her career as managing editor at the North Shore Magazine in Winnetka, Illinois in 1979. Weldon then moved to associate editor at the Adweek Magazine in Chicago, Illinois, and in 1981 became the Midwest market editor at Fairchild Publications. In July 1984, Weldon became a feature writer and columnist for the Dallas Times Herald in Dallas, Texas, where she worked until December 1988. In 1989, she began working for the Chicago Tribune as a regular freelance contributor. Weldon has also been a columnist for West Suburban Living in Elmhurst, Illinois since 1996. In June 2011, Weldon began work as a columnist for The Huffington Post in culture, women, and media verticals. Weldon has also written for Al Jazeera. She has written for Washington Post, USA Today, CNN, Fulcrum, Newsweek, Los Angeles Times, Next Avenue, and more.

In addition to her body of work as a freelancer and opinion writer, Weldon has also taught at the Medill School of Journalism from 1996 to 2014, shen she became assistant professor emerita. and has written seven nonfiction books. She has also been the owner and instructor of Writing to Save Your Life Workshops since 2000, where she continues to speak at keynotes. In 2011, she began working as the leader of the Public Voices Fellowship at Stanford University, Northwestern University, and Princeton University through The OpEd Project. In 2016, she became editorial director of Take The Lead. She is also a frequent live storyteller and in 2012 was in The Moth Grandslam in Chicago.

== Books ==
- I Closed My Eyes (1999) ISBN 1-56838-742-3
- Writing To Save Your Life: How To Honor Your Story Through Journaling (2001) ISBN 1-56838-742-3
- Everyman News: The Changing American Front Page (2008) ISBN 0-8262-1777-X
- Just Me And My Three Sons (2014) ASIN: B07DF4KR1D
- Escape Points: A Memoir (2015) ISBN 9781613733523
- Act Like You're Having a Good Time: Essays (2020), Northwestern University Press, ISBN 978-0-8101-4294-7
- The Time We Have: Essays On Pandemic Living (2024)
