= Madhu Reddy =

Madhu Reddy is a Professor of Informatics at the University of California, Irvine. Previously he worked in the School of Communication at Northwestern University and before that was a faculty member in the Penn State College of Information Sciences and Technology, and the School of Management and Information Systems at the University of Missouri-Rolla.

He is the recipient of the 2002 Diana Forsythe Prize given by the American Medical Informatics Association for the best paper of the year at the intersection of medical informatics and social science. Reddy currently chairs the Diana Forsythe Award Committee.
