= Rinad Beidas =

American clinical child psychologist (born 1982)

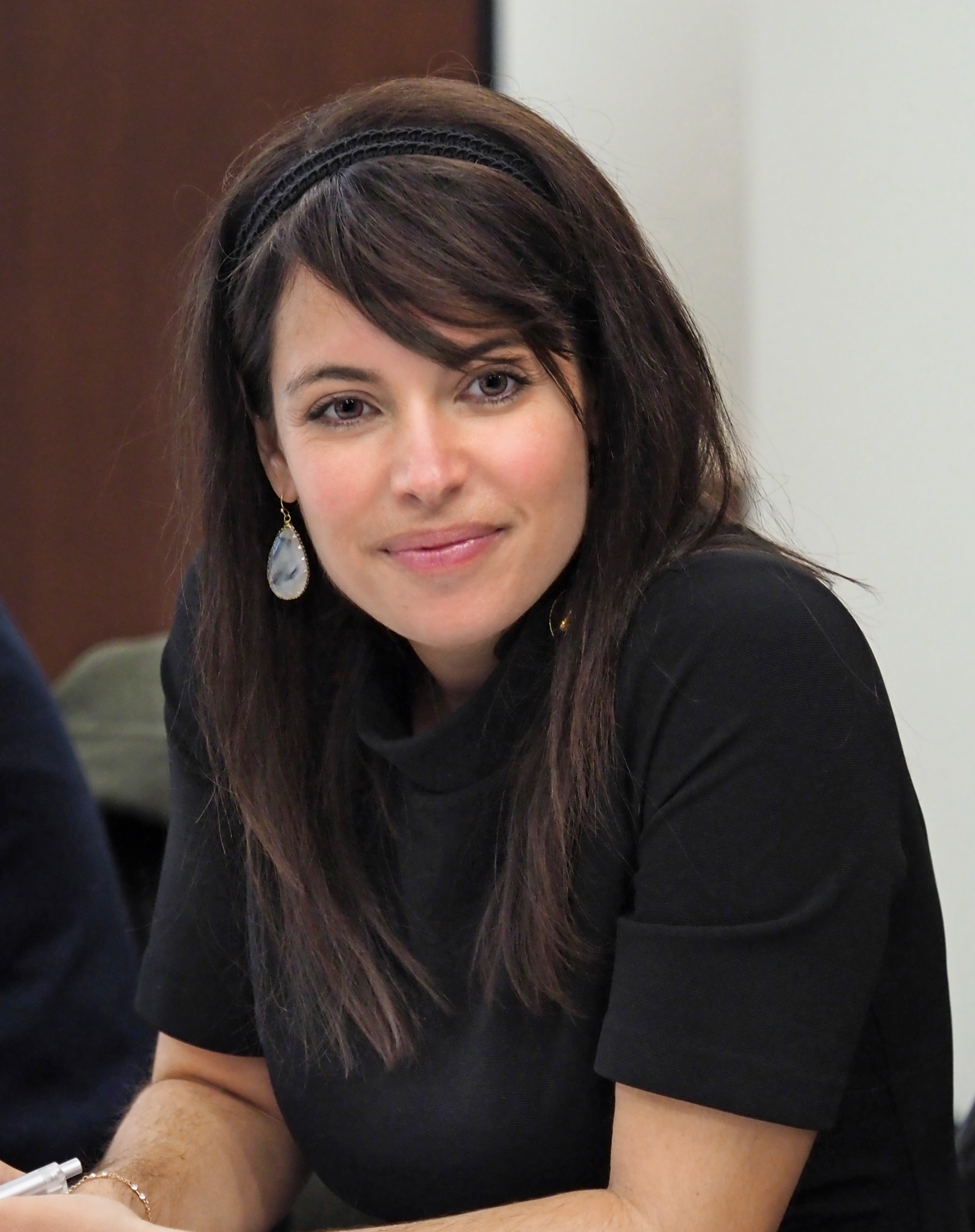
- Beidas 2018 PISCE meeting
- Born: January 1, 1982 (age 44); Amman, Jordan

Academic background
- Education: BA, psychology, 2003, Colgate University; MA, PhD, 2011, Temple University

Academic work
- Institutions: Perelman School of Medicine at the University of Pennsylvania; Northwestern University Feinberg School of Medicine

Rinad S. Beidas (January 1, 1982) is an American clinical child psychologist and implementation scientist. She is currently the chair and Ralph Seal Paffenbarger Professor of the department of Medical Social Sciences at the Northwestern University Feinberg School of Medicine. She was formerly professor of Psychiatry and Medical Ethics and Health Policy at the Perelman School of Medicine at the University of Pennsylvania; Founding Director of the Penn Implementation Science Center (PISCE@LDI); and Director of the Penn Medicine Nudge Unit. She also served as associate director at the University of Pennsylvania's Center for Health Incentives and Behavioral Economics (CHIBE).

== Early life and education ==
Beidas was born on January 1, 1982, in Amman, Jordan. She earned her Bachelor of Arts degree from Colgate University in 2003 and her Master's degree and PhD from Temple University. While completing her doctoral degree, she received the 2008 Assembly of Scientist/Practitioner Psychologists award. She also worked under the guidance of Philip C. Kendall at his Child and Adolescent Anxiety Disorders Clinic, wherein she treated children with anxiety using a cognitive-behavioral approach.

== Career ==
Upon completing her PhD, Beidas joined the faculty at the Perelman School of Medicine at the University of Pennsylvania in 2012. In her early years at the school, one of her family members died by suicide using a firearm. This led her to research firearm safety evidence-based practices and study firearm safety in pediatric primary care. In her role as an assistant professor of psychiatry, Beidas lead a study titled A Hybrid Effectiveness-Implementation Trial of an Evidence-Based Exercise Intervention for Breast Cancer Survivors which aimed at finding barriers to implementation of the evidence-based exercise and education program for breast cancer survivors. The following year, she was the recipient of the 2015 President's New Researcher Award of the Association for Behavioral and Cognitive Therapies.

In 2017, Beidas was the senior author on the longest known study looking at suicidal ideation following cognitive behavioural therapy (CBT) treatment in youth. The results of the study found that patients who did not respond to CBT in their childhood as a treatment for anxiety were more likely to endure suicidal thoughts seven to 19 years after treatment. She also received funding from the National Institute of Mental Health for her project to encourage therapists to use evidence-based practices more often in their sessions. In 2020, Beidas was the principal investigator of a National Institute of Mental Health funded research project aimed at improving the implementation of an evidence-based firearm safety program.

In 2022, she moved to Northwestern University to join the faculty at Northwestern University Feinberg School of Medicine.

== Selected publications ==
- Dissemination and Implementation of Evidence-Based Practices in Child and Adolescent Mental Health (co-edited)
