= June K. Robinson =

American dermatologist

- Born: January 26, 1950 (age 76); U.S.A.
- Occupations: Dermatologist, academic and researcher
- Awards: National Service Award, St. George Medal, American Cancer Society; Samuel J. Stegman Award for Distinguished Service, American Society for Dermatologic Surgery; Gold Medal, American Academy of Dermatology

Academic background
- Education: B.A. M.D.
- Alma mater: University of Pennsylvania; University of Maryland School of Medicine

Academic work
- Institutions: Feinberg School of Medicine, Northwestern University

June K. Robinson is an American dermatologist, academic and researcher. She is a Research Professor of Dermatology at Northwestern University’s Feinberg School of Medicine.

Robinson’s research focuses on skin cancer, with special emphasis on early detection and primary prevention of melanoma. She has authored over 270 research publications. She has spent over 20 years as an advocate for regulating indoor tanning, which resulted in its successful restriction for minors in Illinois and other US states. Her efforts led to the passing of a resolution by the House of Delegates of the American Medical Association to restrict the non-medical use of tanning devices in 1994.

Robinson was the first woman to be formally trained as a fellow in Mohs surgery for the removal of skin cancer. She was also the first woman to have held the leadership positions such as President of American Cancer Society, Illinois Division, President of the American Society of Dermatologic Surgery, Secretary Treasurer of the American Academy of Dermatology, and Editor of JAMA Dermatology. She provided a platform for advocacy by these organizations to reduce the incidence of and mortality from skin cancer.

== Education ==
Robinson graduated from University of Pennsylvania in 1970 and received her Doctoral degree from University of Maryland School of Medicine in 1974. She then completed her Residencies at Greater Baltimore Medical Center and Dartmouth–Hitchcock Medical Center. She was the Chief Resident at Dartmouth Hitchcock Medical Center from 1977 until 1978. She completed her fellowship from New York University Skin and Cancer Clinic in 1978-1979.

== Career ==
Robinson started off as an Instructor of Dermatology at Dartmouth Hitchcock Medical Center and at New York University before joining Northwestern University Medical School as an Assistant Professor of Dermatology in 1979, and of Surgery, in 1980. She was promoted to Associate Professor in 1985 and taught as a Professor from 1991 until 1998.

Robinson then took on administrative positions and became Director of the Division of Dermatology at Loyola University in Chicago from 1998 till 2004. In the following year, she served as Section Chief of Dermatology at Dartmouth- Hitchcock Medical Center before rejoining Northwestern University in 2005, as a Research Professor of Dermatology at Feinberg School of Medicine.

Robinson has also held hospital appointments along with academic designations. She has been associated with Lakeside Veterans Administration Hospital, Foster McGaw Hospital at Loyola University Medical Center, Mary Hitchcock Memorial Hospital, and Northwestern Memorial Hospital.

== Research ==
Robinson has conducted significant research regarding early detection and primary prevention of skin cancers, with special emphasis on melanoma and basal cell carcinoma. In 1994, she advocated for Medicare coverage for preventive care for skin cancer screening by physicians in testimony at the Institute of Medicine given on behalf of the American Academy of Dermatology. She has also been actively involved in advocating restricted indoor tanning. Additionally, she refined facial reconstructive surgical concepts such as maintaining the patency of the nasal valve during reconstruction of the nose, using the cosmetic units of the face to plan reconstruction and using suspension sutures in facial reconstruction.

=== Detection of skin cancer ===
Robinson conducted seminal research on immunoperoxidase staining of frozen sections to detect skin cancer in surgical specimens. By staining with an anti-keratin stain, this technique improved the detection of squamous cell carcinoma cells among inflammatory infiltrated frozen sections of the margins of resection of tumors. Her research led to improved cure rates and reduced the amount of tissue resected with Mohs surgery. Similarly, in 1994 she reported the use of antibodies to HMB-45 to delineate the margins of melanoma in situ in frozen tissue resected with Mohs surgery.

As she followed patients who had basal cell carcinoma surgically resected, Robinson observed that many patients developed another basal cell carcinoma. In 1980, she established a database and did a 5-year prospective study of the incidence of another basal cell carcinoma after the index lesion was resected. Her research established that 36% of patients developed a second basal cell carcinoma within 3 years.

Robinson performed seminal research on partner assistance in skin self-examination (SSE) for early detection of melanoma in at-risk patients. She determined the importance of the partner in assisting with visual inspection of areas of the body that are difficult for self-examination. Her research enhanced the self-efficacy in performing SSE and enabled appropriate management decisions regarding seeking an appointment with a physician. The randomized clinical trial that she performed demonstrated that melanoma survivors and their skin check partners who received skills training in-person or remotely had greater detection of melanoma than controls without unnecessary physician visits for concerning moles.

=== Indoor tanning ===
Robinson conducted the first United States population-based study of the incidence of indoor tanning in Illinois and also highlighted the rate and extent of indoor tanning, which was previously unknown. Her behavioral research team established the pivotal role of appearance concerns that mediated indoor tanning by young women.

She was an integral part of the team that also developed a parent-based intervention that proved to be effective in changing behavior. She also contributed significantly to the restriction of indoor tanning for minors in Illinois and other US states.

=== Facial reconstructive surgical principals ===
Robinson studied a series of cases in which resecting skin cancer in the nasal area led to nasal valve malfunction when the resection was located in the alar crease at the junction of the sidewall of the nose. The resulting nasal stuffiness or difficulty getting air into the nose was alleviated by the novel technique of creating a cartilage batten to restore the lost cartilage prior to placing the flap. In 1985, she defined the cosmetic units of the face by their surface attributes of pigmentation, texture, hair, pore size, density of sebaceous glands and response to blush stimuli as well as the deeper characteristics of elasticity and mobility in the text, Fundamentals of Skin Biopsy. She implemented the reconstruction theory of the facial cosmetic units with suspension sutures to fix the closure line at the junction of cosmetic units and placed tension bearing suspension sutures to repair the alar facial junction. In 2004, she demonstrated restoration of facial contours without distortion of surrounding structures in 500 cases repaired by moving the tissue to place the closure line at the junction of cosmetic units.

== Awards and honors ==
- 2002 - Wilma Bergfeld, MD Visionary and Leadership Award, Women’s Dermatologic Society
- 2004 - National Service Award, St. George Medal, American Cancer Society
- 2006 - Samuel J. Stegman Award for Distinguished Service, American Society for Dermatologic Surgery
- 2008 - Frederic E. Mohs Award for Career Achievement, American College of Mohs Surgery
- 2015 - Gold Medal, American Academy of Dermatology
- 2019 - Honor Award and Gold Key of the Medical Alumni Association, University of Maryland

== Bibliography ==
=== Selected books ===
- Fundamentals of Skin Biopsy (1985) ISBN 9780815173120
- Atlas of Cutaneous Surgery (1996) ISBN 9780721654041
- Cutaneous Medicine and Surgery: An Integrated Program in Dermatology (1996) ISBN 9780721648545
- Surgery of the Skin: Procedural Dermatology (2005, 2010, 2015) ISBN 9780323027526
- Cancer of the Skin, 2nd Edition (2011) ISBN 9781437717884

=== Selected articles ===
- Glanz K, Yaroch AL, Dancel M, Saraiya M, Crane LA, Buller DB, Manne S, O’Riordan DL, Heckman CJ, Hay J, Robinson JK. Measures of sun exposure and sun protection practices for behavioral and epidemiologic research. Archives of Dermatology 2008;144:217-222.
- Robinson JK. Risk of developing another basal cell carcinoma: a five year prospective study. Cancer 1987;60:118 120
- Ho BK, Reidy K, Huerta I, Dilley K, Crawford S, Hultgren BA, Mallett KA, Turrisi R, Robinson JK. Effectiveness of a multi-component sun protection program for young children: A randomized clinical trial. JAMA Pediatrics 2016;170(4):334-42. PMID26857829 PMC4565771
- Robinson JK, Wayne JD, Martini MC, Hultgren BA, Mallett KA, Turrisi R. Early detection of new melanomas by patients with melanoma and their partners using a structured skin self-examination skills training intervention: a randomized clinical trial. JAMA Dermatology 2016;152(9):979-985.
- Robinson JK, Reavy R, Mallett KA, Turrisi R. Remote skin self-examination training of melanoma survivors and their skin check partners: a randomized trial and comparison with in-person training. Cancer Medicine. 2020;00:1-9.
