= Dinee Simpson =

American surgeon

Dinee Collings Simpson is an American surgeon. She is an assistant professor of surgery in the Division of Organ Transplantation at Northwestern University’s Feinberg School of Medicine and founding director of the Northwestern Medicine African American Transplant Access Program. As of 2019, she is the only female, African-American organ transplant surgeon in Chicago.

== Early life ==
While earning her Bachelor of Science degree in Chemistry at Colgate University, Simpson was diagnosed with two breast masses that needed to be removed. Following the surgery, Simpson chose to pursue a career in medicine. However, she was too late to apply to medical school so she accepted a position at a tech company in New York which "collected data on how consumers looked for health care information online and then provided that data to drug manufacturers to help them target their marketing efforts." While serving in this role, she realized there was a gap in medicine in regards to advertising to people of color.

The following year, Simpson enrolled at the New York University School of Medicine and completed her residency at Brigham and Women's Hospital in 2008. She also completed a fellowship in abdominal transplant surgery at the University of Pennsylvania Medical Center. During her residency, Simpson said many of her African American patients were surprised to see her as their doctor, saying "there was something about me looking the way that I looked that comforted them."

== Career ==
In 2017, Simpson joined Loyola University Medical Center as an assistant professor in the division of intra-abdominal transplant surgery. She shortly thereafter left to accept a similar position at Northwestern University’s Feinberg School of Medicine as their assistant professor of surgery in the Division of Organ Transplantation. At her new institution, Simpson established the African American Transplant Access Program in order to eliminate disparities for the African American community. As part of their outreach, the program set up satellite clinics and sent medical professionals into the community. Through these actions, she hoped to dispel mistrust African-Americans have in the medical community. As of 2019, she is the only female, African-American organ transplant surgeon in Chicago.

During the COVID-19 pandemic, Simpson co-authored a study in the American Journal of Transplantation titled Dismantling Structural Racism as a Root Cause of Racial Disparities in COVID-19 and Transplantation.

== Personal life ==
Simpson has two sons.
