= Arthur Charles Lewis Brown =

American scholar (1869–1946)

Arthur Charles Lewis Brown (August 18, 1869 – June 21, 1946) was an American scholar who wrote on the origin of Arthurian Romances.

== Biography ==
Brown was born in Avon, New York, son of Rev. Charles Fortune and Sarah C. (Lewis) Brown. His father was a popular Episcopal missionary and priest who authored Christ on the Throne of Power and Antichrist: A Treatise on the Book of Revelation, to St. John the Divine in 1885. Given his Episcopal upbringing, in 1883, Arthur attended and graduated Hobart College, the oldest Episcopal college in America. In 1896, he assumed a teaching post with Haverford College in Pennsylvania, where he began his studies of the legends of King Arthur. He returned to school at Harvard, earning his Ph.D. in 1900, and continued his post-doctoral work as a Rogers Traveling Fellow of Harvard at Universities of Paris and Freiburg 1900-1901. His doctoral dissertation attempted to find a connection between the story of King Arthur and Celtic folklore. The thesis, “The Round Table Before Wace” is still often quoted and argued among scholars and historians. As a graduate student at Harvard, Brown had stated that “he detested the elective system” in American education, which Harvard President Eliot had indoctrinated, and throughout his career he would maintain that a true liberal education could only be one that embraced “the 'noble' subjects, Latin and Greek, mathematics, and philosophy.”

On June 15, 1907, Arthur married Octavia Crenshaw, from Richmond, Virginia, and they settled in Evanston, Illinois where Brown was Professor of English at Northwestern University from 1906-1939. During this tenure, he produced one to two articles annually, most of which pertained to Arthurian legends and Celtic folklore. Brown's one great interest of his scholarly life was the effort to find the origin of the Arthurian romances, resulting in a voluminous outpouring of articles, books and reviews under variations of his name.

On June 28, 1946, as he was turning his bicycle from a connecting into a main road, Brown was struck by a passing car. Although he declared himself unhurt, and wanted to remount and continue, he was carried protesting to a Dubuque hospital and died a few hours later of a fractured skull. He was 76 years old.

== Bibliography ==
Brown, Arthur Charles Lewis: The Round Table before Wace. pp. 183–205 of Studies and Notes in Philology, Vol. VII. Boston:, 1900. (See The Round Table.)
---. Iwain; a Study in the Origins of Arthurian Romance., 1903.
Brown, A. C. L: "Balin and the Dolorous Stroke." Modern Philology 7.2 (1909): 203-6.
Brown, Arthur C. L. ---. "Welsh Traditions in Layamon's "Brut"." Modern Philology 1.1 (1903): 95-103.
---. "Gulliver's Travels and an Irish Folk-Tale." Modern Language Notes 19.2 (1904): 45-6.
---. "The Knight of the Lion." PMLA 20.4 (1905): 673-706.
---. "The Bleeding Lance." PMLA 25.1 (1910): 1-59.
---. "Chrétien's "Yvain"." Modern Philology 9.1 (1911): 109-28.
---. "Review: [Untitled]." The American Journal of Theology 16.3 (1912): 482-4.
---. "Review: The Spear of Longinus." Modern Language Notes 28.1 (1913): 21-6.
---. "From Cauldron of Plenty to Grail." Modern Philology 14.7 (1916): 385-404.
---. "The Newberry Library." The Journal of American Folklore 31.120 (1918): 274.
---. "The Grail and the English "Sir Perceval". I." Modern Philology 16.11 (1919): 553-68.
---. "The Grail and the English "Sir Perceval". VI." Modern Philology 17.7 (1919): 361-82.
---. "The Grail and the English "Sir Perceval". (Continued)." Modern Philology 18.4 (1920): 201-28.
---. "The Grail and the English "Sir Perceval". (Continued)." Modern Philology 18.12 (1921): 661-73.
---. "The Chairman's Address: What to do Next?" PMLA 36., Appendix (1921): lxxxvii-xcix.
---. "The Grail and the English Sir Perceval." Modern Philology 22.2 (1924): 113-32.
---. "The Grail and the English Sir Perceval. V." Modern Philology 22.1 (1924): 79-96.
---. "Did Chretien Identify the Grail with the Mass?" Modern Language Notes 41.4 (1926): 226-33.
---. "A Note on the Nugae of G. H. Gerould's "King Arthur and Politics"." Speculum 2.4 (1927): 449-55.
---. "Review: [Untitled]." Modern Language Notes 44.1 (1929): 58-60.
---. "Review: [Untitled]." Modern Language Notes 44.6 (1929): 407-8.
---. "Review: [Untitled]." Modern Language Notes 45.4 (1930): 265-6.
---. "Review: [Untitled]." Speculum 6.2 (1931): 305-8.
---. "Review: [Untitled]." Modern Language Notes 46.3 (1931): 182-3.
---. "Review: [Untitled]." Modern Language Notes 46.7 (1931): 483-4.
---. "Review: [Untitled]." Speculum 10.1 (1935): 100-1.
---. "Arthur's Loss of Queen and Kingdom." Speculum 15.1 (1940): 3-11.
---. "The Esplumoir and Viviane." Speculum 20.4 (1945): 426-32.
Brown, Arthur Charles Lewis, and Modern Language Association of America. The Origin of the Grail Legend. Cambridge, Mass.: Harvard University Press, 1943.
