= Eva Gottwein =

American virologist

Eva H. Gottwein
- Education: Postdoctoral: Duke University 2010 PhD, Biology: Heidelberg University 2005
- Scientific career
- Fields: Virology, Microbiology, Immunology
- Institutions: Northwestern University Feinberg School of Medicine

Eva Henriette Gottwein is a virologist and Associate Professor of Microbiology-Immunology at Northwestern University Feinberg School of Medicine in Chicago, Illinois. The main focus of her research is the role of viral miRNAs involved in herpesviral oncogenesis. Gottwein is member of Robert H. Lurie Comprehensive Cancer Center of Northwestern University. Her contributions as a member include the focus on how encoded miRNAs target and function in the human oncogenic herpesvirus Kaposi's sarcoma-associated herpesvirus known as KSHV.

== Education and career ==
Gottwein received her PhD in biology from Heidelberg University in 2005. During her postdoctoral work, Eva Gottwein studied herpesviral miRNA in Bryan Cullen's laboratory at Duke University. Eva Gottwein currently is an associate professor of microbiology-immunology at Northwestern University Feinberg School of Medicine.

== Research contributions ==
The focus of her work involves identifying the function of microRNAs that are encoded in the human herpesvirus Kaposi's sarcoma-associated herpesvirus (KSHV). KSHV causes tumors by infecting endothelial cells. Since the AIDS epidemic in Africa, KSHV is also known to attack and infect B lymphocytes, which results in a person having B cell lymphomas and effusion lymphoma. Prior to her laboratory experience at Duke University, the target for KSHV microRNAs were unknown. Gottwein recently studied the expression of KSHV mRNAs. Through her research she found that Kaposi's sarcoma-associated herpesvirus (KSHV) has nearly 20 viral mRNAs. During her research she discovered that miR-K10 by itself has the ability to transform cells. In another experiment, Gottwein research found that the function of miRNA KSHV proteins that were used to target certain cellular RNAs. Through her experiment she discovered abnormal ligand reactions that occurred during the absence of exogenous ligase and a unique miRNA binding site. Her goal for the next few years is to learn more about the targetome of the KSHV microRNAs and identification of the virus' functions in oncogenesis.

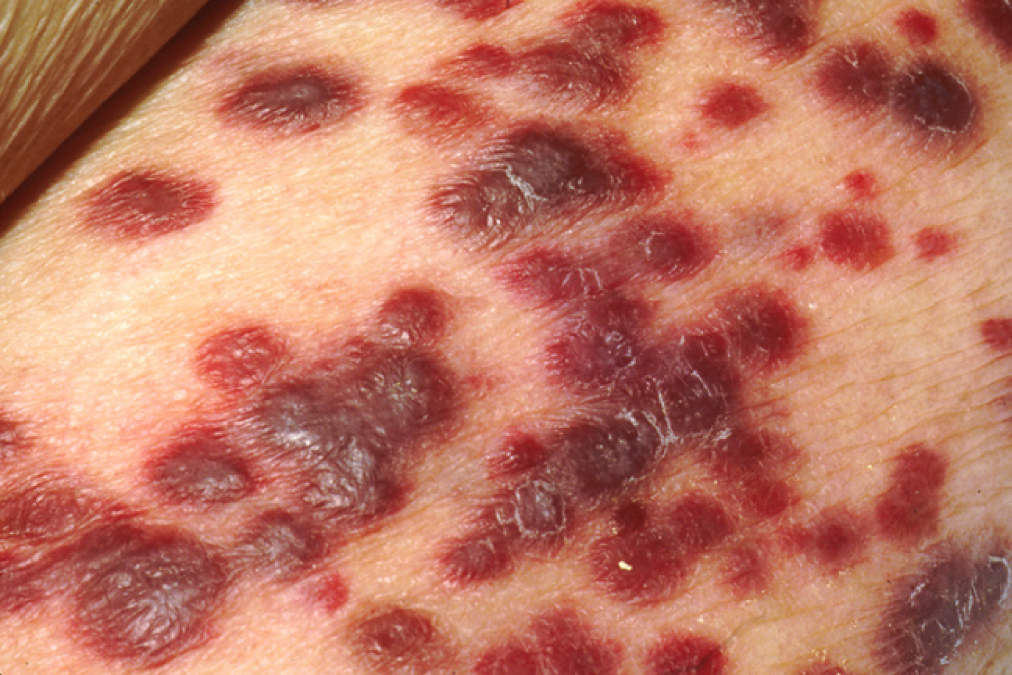
Kaposis Sarcoma Lesions

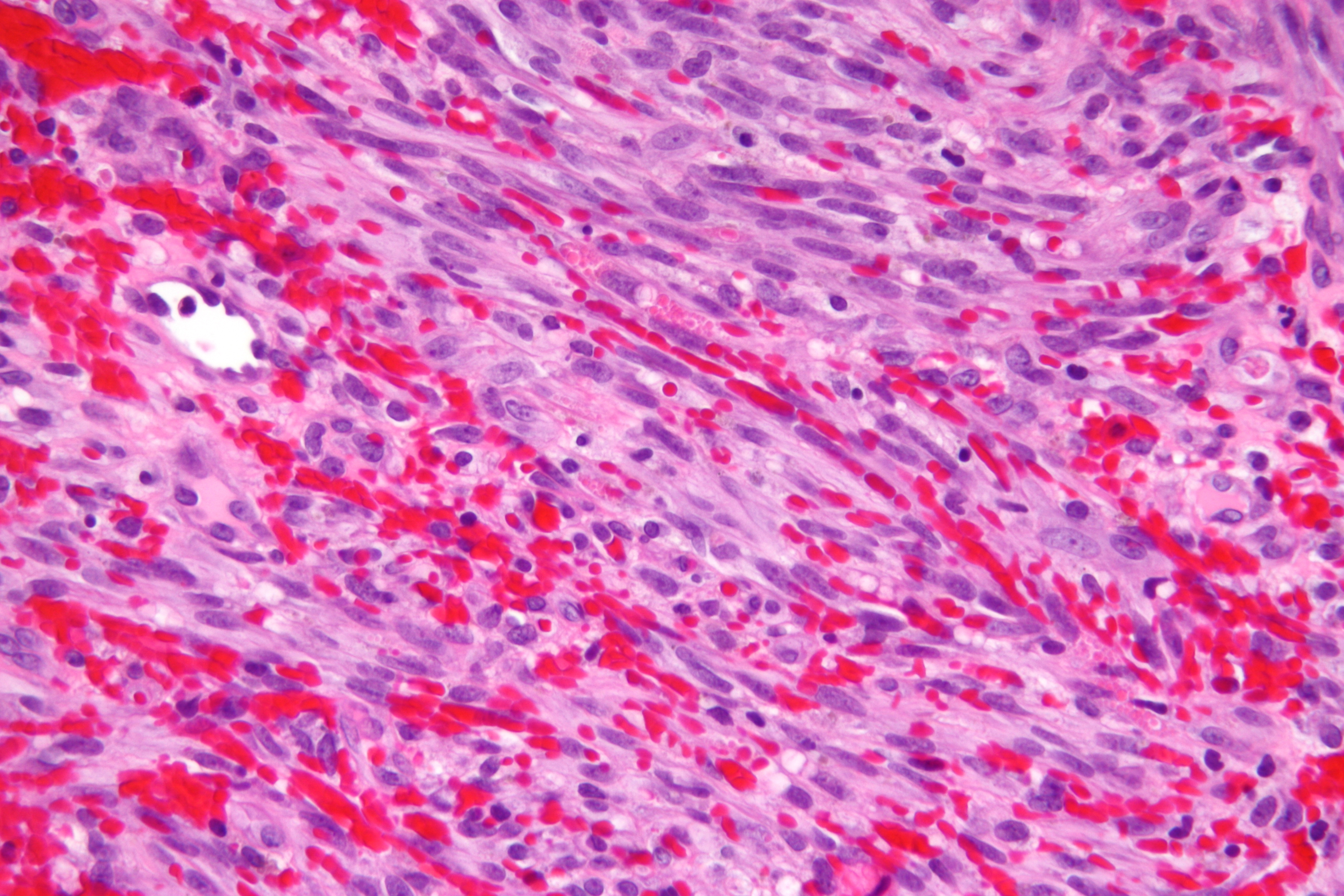
Micrograph of Kaposi sarcoma. H&E stain.

== Notable publications ==
- Forte, Eleonora; Raja, Archana N.; Shamulailatpam, Priscilla; Manzano, Mark; Schipma, Matthew J.; Casey, John L.; Gottwein, Eva (2015-02-15). "MicroRNA-mediated transformation by the Kaposi's sacromaassociated herpesvirus Kaposin locus". Journal of Virology. 89 (4): 2333–2341. doi:10.1128/jvi.03317-14. PMC 4338870. PMID 25505059.
- Khare, Sonal; Ratsimandresy, Rojo A.; De Almeida, Lucia; Cuda, Carla M.; Rellick, Stephanie L.; Misharin, Alexander V.; Wallin, Melissa C.; Gangopadhyay, Anu; Forte, Eleonora; Gottwein, Eva (April 2014). "The PYRIN domain-only protein POP3 inhibits ALR inflammasomes and regulates responses to infection with DNA viruses". Nature Immunology. 15 (4): 343–353. doi:10.1038/ni.2829. PMC 4123781. PMID 24531343.
- Gottwein, Eva (2012). "Kaposi's sarcoma-associated herpesvirus microRNAs". Frontiers in Microbiology. 3: 165. doi:10.3389/fmicb.2012.00165. PMC 3342587. PMID 22563327.
- Gottwein, Eva; Corcoran, David L.; Mukherjee, Neelanjan; Skalsky, Rebecca L.; Hafner, Markus; Nusbam, Jeffrey D.; Shamulailatpam, Priscilla; Love, Cassandra L.; Dave, Sandeep S.; Tuschl, Thomas (2011-11-17). "viral microrna targetome of kshv-infected primary effusion lymphoma cell lines". Cell Host and Microbe. 10 (5): 515–526. doi:10.1016/j.chom.2011.09.012. PMC 3222872. PMID 22100165.
- Gottwein, Eva; Cullen, Bryan R. (2010-05-15). "A human herpesvirus MicroRNA inhibits p21 expression and attenuates p21-mediated cell cycle arrest". Journal of Virology. 84 (10): 5229–5237. doi:10.1128/jvi.00202-10. PMC 2863803. PMID 20219912.
- Gottwein, Eva; Cullen, Bryan R. (2008-06-12). "Viral and Cellular MicroRNAs as Determinants of Viral Pathogenesis and Immunity". Cell Host and Microbe. 3 (6): 375–387. doi:10.1016/j.chom.2008.05.002. PMC 3079432. PMID 18541214.
- Gottwein, Eva; Mukherjee, Neelanjan; Sachse, Christoph; Frenzel, Corina; Majoros, William H.; Jen-; Chi, Tsan A.; Braich, Ravi; Manoharan, Muthiah; Soutschek, Jurgen; Ohler, Uwe (December 2007). "A viral microRNA functions as an orthologue of cellular miR-155". Nature. 450 (7172): 1096–1099. Bibcode:2007Natur.450.1096G. doi:10.1038/nature05992. PMC 2614920. PMID 18075594.
- Gottwein, Eva; Cai, Xuezhong; Cullen, Bryan R. (June 2006). "A novel assay for viral microRNA function identifies a single nucleotide polymorphism that affects Drosha processing". Journal of Virology. 80 (11): 5321–5326. doi:10.1128/jvi.02734-05. PMC 1472151. PMID 16699012.
- Gottwein, Eva; Jager, Stefanie; Habermann, Anja; Krausslich, Hans-Georg (July 2006). "Cumulative mutations of ubiquitin acceptor sites in human immunodeficiency virus type 1 Gag cause a late budding defect". Journal of Virology. 80 (13): 6267–6275. doi:10.1128/jvi.02177-05. PMC 1488962. PMID 16775314.
- Gottwein, Eva; Krausslich, Hans-Georg (July 2005). "Analysis of human immunodeficiency virus type 1 Gag ubiquitination". Journal of Virology. 79 (14): 9134–9144. doi:10.1128/jvi.79.14.9134-9144.2005. PMC 1168789. PMID 15994808.
- Gottwein, Eva; Bodem, Jochen; Muller, Barbara; Schmechel, Ariane; Zentgraf, Hanswalter; Krausslich, Hans-Georg (September 2003). "The Mason-Pfizer monkey virus PPPY and PSAP motifs both contribute to virus release". Journal of Virology. 77 (17): 9474–9485. doi:10.1128/jvi.77.17.9474-9485.2003. PMC 187385. PMID 12915562.
