= Infrastructure Technology Institute =

Research center at Northwestern University

Coordinates: 42°3′28.2″N 87°40′33.1″W

The Infrastructure Technology Institute (ITI) is a federally funded transportation research center at Northwestern University in Evanston, Illinois. ITI was founded by an $18 million grant in 1992, and in 1998 was named one of six "top tier" university transportation centers in the nation and awarded a $12 million, six-year federal grant through the Transportation Equity Act for the 21st Century. A primary focus of the work of ITI is structural health monitoring as well as advanced structural modeling methods. Currently, Professor Joseph Schofer is serving as a director of the institute.
