= Linda Suleiman =

American physician

Linda Idris Suleiman
- Born: Washington, D.C.
- Education: University of Maryland, College Park; Howard University College of Medicine
- Scientific career
- Workplaces: Feinberg School of Medicine

Linda Idris Suleiman is an American physician, Assistant Dean of Medical Education and Director of Diversity and Inclusion at the Feinberg School of Medicine.

== Early life and education ==
Suleiman's parents are from Mogadishu, in Somalia. Her mother was an anaesthesiologist and her father worked for the port authority. Suleiman's mother worked as a physician throughout the civil unrest in Mogadishu. They immigrated to Canada during the Somali Civil War, taking their three children (including Suleiman) and her teenage cousin with them. Suleiman has said that she was inspired to become a physician because of her mother. Her family relocated to Hamilton, Ontario, where her mother's medical degree was not recognised and her parents were forced to do janitorial work. Together they helped to settle refugees who had arrived in Canada. For her undergraduate studies, Suleiman studied neurobiology and physiology at the University of Maryland, College Park. She completed her medical training at Howard University College of Medicine, where she saw pictures of LaSalle D. Leffall Jr. on the walls. These experiences focussed her aspirations on becoming an orthopaedic surgeon. In 2009 Suleiman was made an Orthopaedic medical intern as part of the Nth Dimensions programme. Nth Dimensions supports women and minorities who want to become orthopaedic surgeons. She completed a rotation at the Lurie Children's Hospital in Chicago, where she was mentored by Erik King, Lurie Children's' first Black orthopaedic surgeon. When she graduated from the orthopaedic programme at Northwestern Memorial Hospital she was the first Black woman to do so.

== Research and career ==
In 2018 Suleiman joined the faculty at the Feinberg School of Medicine, where she was the first Somali-American woman orthopaedic surgeon. Alongside her clinical practise, Suleiman has worked to improve the representation of women in orthopaedic surgery. She was named the Assistant Dean of Medical Education and Director of Diversity and Inclusion in 2018.

== Select publications ==
- Suleiman, L.I.; Ortega, G.; On'guti, S.K.; Gonzalez, D.O.; Onyike, A.; Turner, P.L.; Fullum, T.M. (2011). "Does BMI Affect Perioperative Complications Following Total Knee And Hip Arthroplasty?". Journal of Surgical Research. 165 (2): 200. doi:10.1016/j.jss.2010.11.601. ISSN 0022-4804.
- Edelstein, Adam I.; Kwasny, Mary J.; Suleiman, Linda I.; Khakhkhar, Rishi H.; Moore, Michael A.; Beal, Matthew D.; Manning, David W. (2015). "Can the American College of Surgeons Risk Calculator Predict 30-Day Complications After Knee and Hip Arthroplasty?". The Journal of Arthroplasty. 30 (9): 5–10. doi:10.1016/j.arth.2015.01.057. ISSN 0883-5403. PMID 26165953.
