= Barry Scott Wimpfheimer =

American scholar

Barry Wimpfheimer
- Education: Yeshiva University (MA); Columbia University (PhD)
- Years active: 2000-present
- Awards: National Jewish Book Award (2018)

Barry Scott Wimpfheimer is an American scholar of the Talmud and Rabbinic literature. He is an associate professor at Northwestern University and chair of its department of religious studies.

== Biography ==
Wimpfheimer grew up in an Orthodox Jewish household in New York City, New York and began studying the Talmud in 5th grade. He earned his BA from Columbia University and MA from Yeshiva University in Talmudic studies. He received his rabbinic ordination in 2000. He then earned a PhD from Columbia in religion, studying under David Halivni. His work has focused on the Babylonian Talmud as a work of law and literature.

Wimpfheimer's book on the history and evolution of the Talmud, The Talmud: A Biography (2018) won a National Jewish Book Award in 2018. He argued that the Talmud can be read in three different ways: the essential Talmud, which sees the Talmud as a work of religious literature produced at a certain historical period; the enhanced Talmud, which sees the text as the central canonical work of Judaism after the Destruction of the temple; and the emblematic Talmud, which sees the scripture as the primary symbol of Jews, Judaism, and Jewishness.

Wimpfheimer also teaches an online introductory Talmud course via Coursera. He is the co-editor of Prooftexts: A Journal of Jewish Literary History.
