= Joseph Schofer =

Joseph L. Schofer
- Born: 1941 (age 84–85)
- Education: Yale University; Northwestern University
- Occupations: Professor of Civil Engineering, Transportation Systems Planning
- Years active: 1967-
- Employer: Northwestern University
- Known for: Transportation Systems Planning, Civil Engineering
- Spouse: Nancy Schofer
- Children: 2
- Awards: Roy W. Crum Distinguished Service Award 2011, Transportation Research Board

Joseph L. Schofer is an American civil engineer specializing in transportation engineering. He has been a professor, consultant and advisor of transportation systems planning, urban planning, urban infrastructure, and related topics.

He taught his last class at Northwestern University (NU) in June 2023, and retired from departmental duties in fall 2021, having begun at NU in autumn of 1970. A symposium was held in his honor on November 17 and 18, 2023, attracting students and colleagues from all his years of teaching to the Allen Center on the campus in Evanston, Illinois.

== Early life and education ==
Schofer earned his B.E. from Yale University and an M.S. and Ph.D. from Northwestern University.

== Career ==
Prior to joining the Northwestern faculty, he taught at the new Chicago Circle campus of the University of Illinois from September 1967 to June 1970, and developed the curriculum for Systems engineering along with Martin Wachs and other staff. That campus has since merged with the UI Medical Center campus also in Chicago, and since September 1982 has been known as the University of Illinois Chicago (UIC).

He is Professor of Civil and Environmental engineering (full professor since 1973). He was Associate Dean from Fall 2002 to March 2005 at the Robert R. McCormick School of Engineering and Applied Science at Northwestern University in Evanston, Illinois, where he has been the Director of the Infrastructure Technology Institute since November 2007.

Schofer has been actively engaged with the Transportation Research Board (TRB) of the National Research Council since 1966, chairing national policy studies on Equity Implications of Evolving Transportation Finance Mechanisms and Strategies for Improved Passenger and Freight Travel Data; serving on the Technical Advisory Committee on Capacity for the Strategic Highway Research Program.

He has been a member of the Northwestern University faculty since 1970, serving as chairman of the department from 1997 to 2002 and as Interim Dean of the McCormick School during 2004–2005. His research and teaching are in transportation policy planning, analysis, evaluation, and behavior.

Schofer co-hosts a podcast called The Infrastructure Show where he interviews infrastructure experts and posts news stories about infrastructure on a monthly basis. The first program was aired on March 25, 2009, and the most recent episode on November 3, 2023; all podcasts are archived on the website.

He is a member of the Institute of Transportation Engineers and a life Member of the American Society of Civil Engineers.

== Awards ==
Schofer received the 2011 Roy W. Crum Distinguished Service Award from the Transportation Research Board.

== Publications ==
Has published 139 articles and book chapters as well as more than 52 technical reports.

== Personal life ==
Joe and his wife Nancy have a son and a daughter.
