= Ronald J. Allen =

American lawyer and academic

- Education: Marshall University (B.S.); University of Michigan Law School
- Occupation: Lawyer

Ronald J. Allen is an American lawyer and the John Henry Wigmore Professor of Law at Northwestern University. He is an expert in evidence law, criminal procedure, and courts. Allen has written over 100 articles and seven books on various legal topics.

== Education ==
Allen completed his B.S. in 1970 from Marshall University in Huntington, West Virginia. He then received his J.D. in 1973 from the University of Michigan Law School.

== Career ==
He taught law at institutes such as the University of Nebraska–Lincoln and State University of New York at Buffalo in the 1970s. He became professor of law at Northwestern University in 1984. Since 1992, he has been the John Henry Wigmore Professor of Law at Northwestern University.

Allen is considered as one of the world's most distinguished scholars by entities including the Ministry of Education (中华人民共和国教育部) of the People's Republic of China in the fields of evidence and procedure. For several years, he has been responsible for hosting and supervising the study and research of Chinese law faculty and students at Northwestern University.

== Honors and awards ==
In 2007, Allen was awarded the Yangtze River Scholar award, the highest academic honor given by the Ministry of Education of the People's Republic of China. He became only the fourth American to receive this award, and the first law professor, domestic or foreign, to be so honored.
