= Melissa Simon =

American physician

Melissa A. Simon
- Education: University of Chicago; University of Illinois at Chicago; Rush Medical College
- Scientific career
- Workplaces: Feinberg School of Medicine; Yale University; Northwestern University

Melissa Andrea Simon is an American clinical obstetrician/gynecologist and scientist who focuses on health equity across the lifespan. Simon is founder and director of the Center for Health Equity Transformation (CHET) in the Feinberg School of Medicine at Northwestern University in Chicago, Illinois, and founder of the Chicago Cancer Health Equity Collaborative, a National Cancer Institute comprehensive cancer partnership led by the Robert H. Lurie Comprehensive Cancer Center of Northwestern University, Northeastern Illinois University, and the University of Illinois at Chicago. She is the George H. Gardner, MD Professor of Clinical Gynecology, the Vice-Chair of Clinical Research in the Department of Obstetrics and Gynecology, tenured professor of Obstetrics and Gynecology, Preventive Medicine and Medical Social Sciences (Implementation Science) at Northwestern University Feinberg School of Medicine, and Associate Director of Community Outreach and Engagement at the Robert H. Lurie Comprehensive Cancer Center.

== Education ==
Simon earned a bachelor's degree from the University of Chicago in 1994, a master's in public health from the University of Illinois at Chicago in 1996, and a medical degree at Rush Medical College in 2000. She completed a residency at Yale University New Haven Hospital, followed by a fellowship in family planning and reproductive health at Northwestern University Feinberg School of Medicine in 2006.

== Career ==
Simons studies inclusion and health equity. She works to create transdisciplinary partnerships that focus on improving the health of vulnerable populations, and transform their interactions with the health care system.

=== Research ===
Simon has led several large community-based intervention trials utilizing community engaged research approaches to extend and adapt the patient navigation intervention model developed by the Patient Navigation Research Program to diverse under-served populations. Simon leads the NCI U54 Chicago Cancer Health Equity Collaborative. She developed and led the first National Cancer Institute developmental Specialized Program of Research Excellence funded in gynecologic cancer disparities which focuses on translational research on cervical, ovarian, and endometrial cancer disparities. She has also collaborated with researchers in Nigeria on a study of cervical cancer and epigenomics in women with HIV.

Simon has led grants funded by the National Library of Medicine partnered with Chicago Public Libraries that seek to improve diversity in clinical trials through the creation of Health for All and Navigating Wellness platforms, and led the ECOG-ACRIN SUPPORT: Multilevel Intervention to Improve Diverse Enrollment in Cancer Clinical Trials study. She has worked on minority aging research and in the support of research education and training with the National Institute on Aging (NIA) Resource Center for Minority Aging Research (RCMAR), the Rutgers-NYU Asian Center for Health Promotion and Equity.

=== Academic service ===
Simon is a mentor for students and faculty who has been recognized with the Presidential Award for Mentorship. She is the Research Director of the National Institute of Child Health and Human Development (NICHD) Women’s Reproductive Health Research K12 Program. Simon is also the Principal Investigator of the NIMHD T37 Minority Research Training in Health Disparities Program. She leads the Center for Health Equity Transformation’s Health Equity Scholars and Chicago CHEC Research Fellows programs, and the Northwestern University Department of Obstetrics and Gynecology's Uterine Leiomyoma Research Center Lab Immersion Program.

=== Government service ===
Simon serves on the Community Preventive Services Task Force, and served on the U.S. Preventive Services Task Force (USPSTF) from 2017-2022. Since 2023, Simon has continued supporting the USPSTF as an advisor. Simon also serves on the NIH's Advisory Committee on Research on Women’s Health. She serves as a member of the National Academy of Medicine's Roundtable on the Promotion of Health Equity, as well as its Board of Population Health and Public Health Practice and the NAM Leadership Consortium’s Care, Culture and Decision-Making Innovation Collaborative. She has chaired an NIH Standing Study Section – Dissemination and Implementation Research in Health (DIRH, now called Science of Implementation in Health and Healthcare) and special emphasis panels.

=== Other service ===
Simon serves on the board of the Metropolitan Chicago Breast Cancer Task Force, and helped to write and implement the Illinois Breast Cancer Quality Screening and Treatment Act. She also serves on the board of the Health and Medicine Policy Research Group. Simon was invited to the JAMA editorial board in 2023. She chairs the Health Equity Committee for the National Cancer Institute's (NCI) Community Oncology Research Program (NCORP) cancer cooperative trials group, Eastern Cooperative Oncology Group and the American College of Radiology Imaging Network (ECOG-ACRIN).

== Selected honours and awards ==
- 2017 National Academy of Medicine Community Health Hero
- 2018 National Science Foundation Presidential Award for Excellence in Science, Mathematics and Engineering Mentoring
- 2018 American Public Health Association Award for Excellence
- 2019 Presidential Leadership Scholars Program
- 2020 Northwestern University Mentor of the Year Award
- 2021 Elected member of the National Academy of Medicine
- 2022 Ranked #1 in Blue Ridge Rankings for NIH Funding for OBGYNs
- 2022 Association of American Physicians

== Select publications ==
- Susan J Curry; Alex H Krist; Douglas K Owens; et al. (August 21, 2018). "Screening for Cervical Cancer: US Preventive Services Task Force Recommendation Statement". JAMA. 320 (7): 674–686. ISSN 0098-7484. PMID 30140884. Wikidata Q59353993.
- E-shien Chang; Melissa Simon; XinQi Dong (December 16, 2010). "Integrating cultural humility into health care professional education and training" (PDF). Advances in Health Sciences Education. 17 (2): 269–278. doi:10.1007/s10459-010-9264-1. ISSN 1382-4996. PMID 21161680. Wikidata Q39805008.
- XinQi Dong; Melissa A. Simon (May 1, 2013). "Elder abuse as a risk factor for hospitalization in older persons". JAMA Internal Medicine. 173 (10): 911–917. doi:10.1001/jamainternmed.2013.238. ISSN 2168-6106. PMC 10001110. PMID 23567991. Wikidata Q39437981.
