= Ravi Kalhan =

Ravi Kalhan is the director of the Asthma and COPD Program at Northwestern University Feinberg School of Medicine and Northwestern Memorial Hospital.

== Education ==
Kalhan received a Bachelor of Arts in history from Brown University. He received his medical degree from Case Western Reserve University School of Medicine, and his Master of Science in clinical investigation from Northwestern University. He completed his internship and residency at the Hospital of the University of Pennsylvania, and his fellowship in pulmonary and critical care medicine at Northwestern.

== Professional affiliations ==
Kalhan is board certified in internal medicine, pulmonary disease and critical care medicine. He is a member of the American Thoracic Society's clinical problems assembly program committee, and previously served on the society's publications policy committee. He is a fellow of the American College of Chest Physicians. He also serves on the scientific program committee of Chicago Respiratory Society.

He serves as a board member and executive committee member for Respiratory Health Association, and he serves on the association's COPD advisory committee. He is chair of the Illinois COPD Coalition, a network of stakeholders working together to address COPD in Illinois.

== Career ==
Kalhan serves as the director of the asthma and COPD program at Northwestern University, as well as a professor of medicine and a professor of preventive medicine at the Feinberg School of Medicine. He also serves as the medical director of the pulmonary rehabilitation program for the Shirley Ryan Ability Lab in Chicago. He directs a research program focused on chronic obstructive pulmonary disease (COPD) and respiratory epidemiology. Kalhan's research group has been particularly interested in how to define "impaired respiratory health" as part of an overall agenda to determine intermediate phenotypes between ideal respiratory health and chronic lung disease which they argue is essential to intercept chronic lung disease at its earliest stages.

== Personal life ==
Kalhan was born and raised in Cleveland, Ohio. His parents are Satish C. Kalhan, a physician scientist who spent his career at Case Western Reserve University, and Santosh B. Kalhan a pediatric anesthesiologist who spent most of her career working at the Cleveland Clinic Foundation.

In 2005, Kalhan married Susan Tsai, a minimally invasive gynecologic surgeon at Northwestern University and Northwestern Memorial Hospital.
