= David Gius =

American physician-scientist

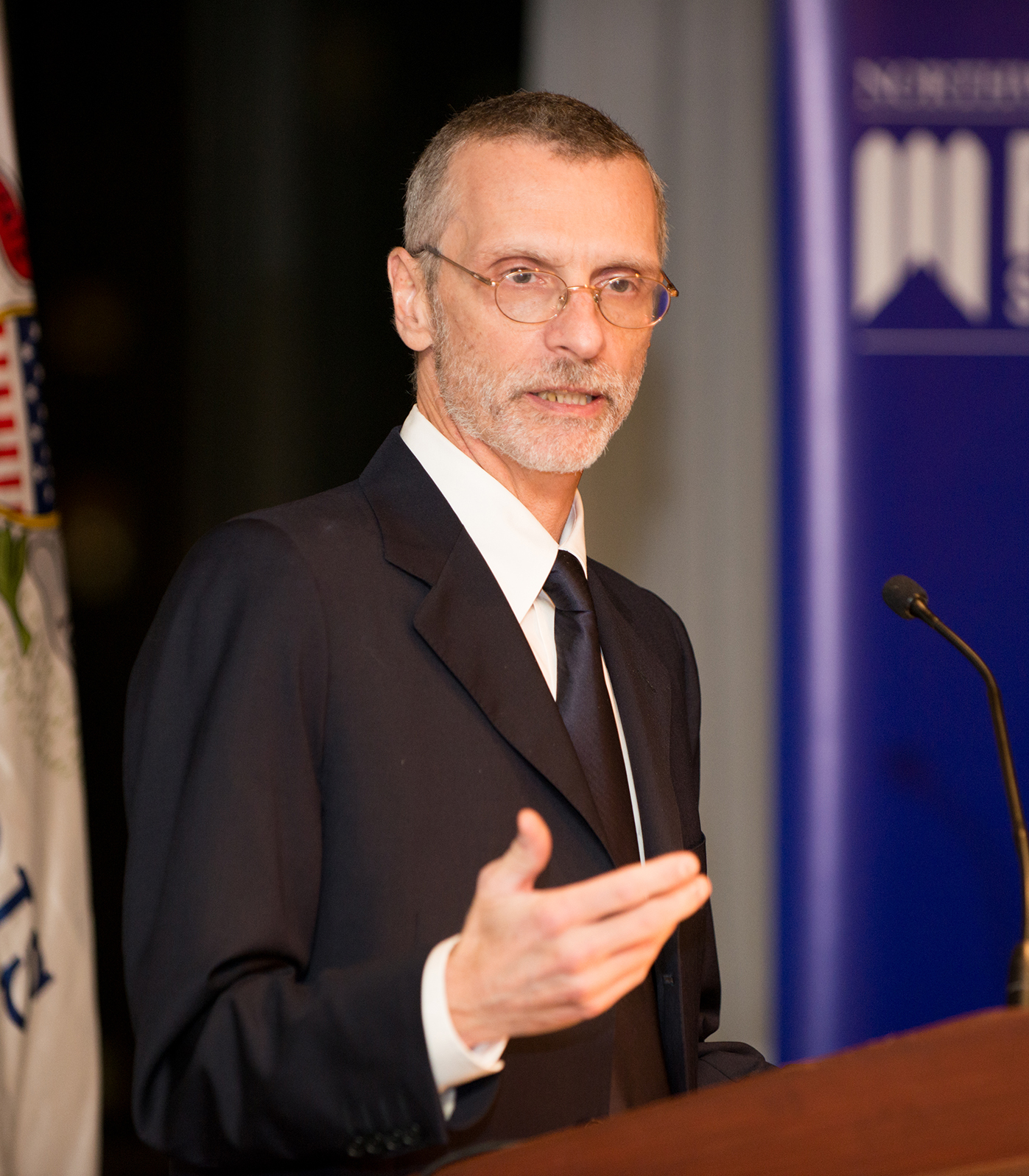
David Gius at a Northwestern event

David R. Gius (born August 23, 1960) is an American physician-scientist the Zell Family Scholar Professor, Women's Cancer Research Program director, and Vice Chair of Translational Research at Northwestern University's Feinberg School of Medicine Department of Radiation Oncology and Pharmacology. His research focuses into the mechanistic connection between aging, cellular and/or mitochondrial metabolism, and carcinogenesis focusing on the Sirtuin gene family.

== Education ==
Gius graduated from the University of Illinois at Chicago in 1983 with an undergraduate degree in chemistry. He completed his Ph.D. at the University of Chicago in 1990, and his M.D. at the Loyola University of Chicago Strich School of Medicine in 1992.

== Career ==
Dr. Gius is Currently a Professor of Radiation Oncology, the Assistant Dean for Research at the Joe R. & Teresa Lozano Long School of Medicine and an Associate Cancer Center Director at the Mays Cancer Center at the University of Health Sciences Center San Antonio (UTHSCSA), San Antonio MD Anderson, San Antonio, TX. He is also the only Radiation Oncologist to serve as an Established Investigator Scholar in Cancer Research as part of the Cancer Prevention and Research Institute of Texas (CPRIT) and one of only 60 awardees since the initiation of CPRIT in 2021.

Dr. Gius did his postdoctoral fellowship training in the Howard Hughes Medical Institute at the University of Chicago, until 1993, with Vikas P. Sukhatme and Tom Curran. Afterwards, he moved to St. Louis, where he did his residency in Radiation Oncology Resident at the Radiation Oncology Center at Washington University School of Medicine where he was also an Assistant Professor and Residency Director of the Section of Cancer Biology in the Department of Radiation Oncology at Washington University in St. Louis. Between 2001 and 2010 he was the Chief of the Molecular Radiation Oncology Section at the National Cancer Institute (NCI) where he also served as the residency director of NCC Radiation Oncology Residency, clinical director of GYN services in the Center for Cancer Research, and a Principal Investigator at the NCI in Bethesda, Maryland. In 2005 he became the Associate Program Director of the National Institutes of Health Oxford-Cambridge Graduate Scholars Program that is a Trans-NIH MD/PhD Partnership Program. Prior to his current appointment at UTHSCSA, Gius was a Professor of Radiation Oncology and the Director of the Women's Cancer Program In at the Robert H. Lurie Cancer Center at the Northwestern University Feinberg School of Medicine

== Selected publications ==
- Lysine 68 acetylation directs MnSOD as a tetrameric detoxification complex versus a monomeric tumor promoter. Nature Commun. 10:2399-2414, 2019.
- Circadian Clock NAD+ Cycle Drives Mitochondrial Oxidative Metabolism in Mice. Science. 342:1243417, 2013.
- SIRT2 Maintains Genome Integrity and Suppresses Tumorigenesis through Regulating APC/C Activity. Cancer Cell. 20:487-499, 2011.
- Sirt3-Mediated Deacetylation of Evolutionarily Conserved Lysine 122 Regulates MnSOD Activity in Response to Stress. Molecular Cell. 40:893-904, 2010.
- SIRT3 is a Mitochondria-Localized Tumor Suppressor Required for Maintenance of Mitochondrial Integrity and Metabolism during Stress. Cancer Cell. 17:41-52, 2010.

== Awards ==
- Member, American Association of Physicians, 2024.
- Established Investigator Scholar in Cancer Research as part of the Cancer Prevention Research Institute of Texas, 2020.
- Fellow of American Society of Therapeutic Radiation Oncology (FASTRO) designation, American Society of Therapeutic Radiation Oncology (2018)
- Member of Alpha Omega Alpha (AOA) Honor Medical Society, American Medical Society (2014)
- Radiation Oncology Teacher of the Year 2001, Radiation Oncology Center Mallinckrodt Institute of Radiology (2001)
- Howard Hughes Research Fellowship, Department of Medicine, the University of Chicago (1989)
