= Sarah A. Connolly =

American virologist

Sarah A. Connolly is an American virologist. She graduated with a PhD from the University of Pennsylvania in 2003 and is notable for her work on Paramyxovirus and Herpes virus.

As of 2020, she is an associate professor of microbiology at DePaul University. She was previously a researcher at Northwestern University, where she worked with Robert A. Lamb.
