= Maha H. Hussain =

Oncologist

Maha H. Hussain is the Genevieve E. Teuton Professor of Medicine and deputy director of the Lurie Comprehensive Cancer Center at Northwestern University's Feinberg School of Medicine. She is an oncologist focusing on genitourinary cancers.

== Biography ==
Hussain was born and raised in Baghdad, Iraq. Both of her parents were chemists.

Hussain studied medicine at the College of Medicine University of Baghdad, graduating in 1980. She did her residency in internal medicine from 1980 to 1983 and fellowship in hematology/oncology from 1983 to 1986 at Wayne State University School of Medicine in Detroit, Michigan. After finishing her training, she worked as a hematologist/oncologist at the VA Medical Center in Detroit for ten years.

She joined the faculty at the University of Michigan in 2002. There, she was the Cis Maisel Professor of Oncology and assistant director of clinical research. In 2016, she joined the faculty at Northwestern University, where she is the Genevieve E. Teuton Professor of Medicine and deputy director of the Robert H. Lurie Comprehensive Cancer Center at the Feinberg School of Medicine. Hussain was a member (2004-2008) and chair (2007-2008) of the U.S. Food and Drug Administration Oncology Drug Advisory Committee.

In 2010, she was elected as a fellow of the American Society for Clinical Oncology (ASCO). She has served on ASCO's board of directors and Clinical Practice Guidelines Committee. In 2015, she was named one of the Giants of Cancer Care by OncLive.

== Research ==
Hussain's research centers on treatment protocols for prostate cancer, seeking to improve outcomes. Hussain conducted an analysis of two major clinical trials and determined that despite stable PSA levels, prostate cancer may have advanced as indicated by imaging scans. Hussain's findings challenge the assumption that PSA numbers are sufficient to monitor prostate cancers and calls for more tracking of prostate cancers. Hussain found that men with hormone resistant prostate cancer and harboring BRCA mutations had better outcomes when treated with a PARP inhibitor drug than men treated with traditional hormone therapy.

== Awards ==
Hussain received the University of Michigan Comprehensive Cancer Center Leadership Award in 2007 and the University of Michigan Medical School League of Research Excellence award in 2011. In 2010, she was elected as a fellow of the American Society for Clinical Oncology (ASCO). She has served on ASCO's board of directors and Clinical Practice Guidelines Committee. In 2015, she was named one of the Giants of Cancer Care by OncLive. In 2024, ScholarGPS named Hussain a Top Scholar and Top 1% of America's Most Honored Doctors 2024.

In 2025, Hussain received the first Prostate Cancer Foundation Women in Science Lifetime Achievement Award. The award recognizes her groundbreaking research in improving the treatment and management of patients with prostate cancer.
