= Wyndham Lathem =

American academic

Wyndham Willoughby Lathem (born August 10, 1974) is an American microbiologist and convicted murderer. He is a former associate professor at Feinberg School of Medicine at Northwestern University, a specialist in pathogenic bacteria.

On July 27, 2017, 26-year-old Trenton Cornell-Duranleau, Lathem's boyfriend, was fatally stabbed over 70 times in Lathem's high-rise apartment. Following the stabbing Lathem went on the run, but turned himself in to police in Oakland, California, on August 4. He was indicted in September 2017 on charges of first-degree murder; prosecutors said Lathem and Andrew Warren, a former Oxford University employee, conspired to kill the victim as part of a premeditated murder-sex fantasy. He was found guilty on October 7, 2021, and sentenced on January 25, 2022, to 53 years in prison. His conviction was overturned on December 6, 2024. The court wrote in its decision, “Due to the trial court’s order forbidding a testifying defendant from consulting with his attorney during an overnight recess in violation of his right to counsel, and our crystal clear and consistent precedent on this issue, we have no choice but to reverse and remand for a retrial. As heinous as murder is, these rights are crucial to the effective administration of justice." .

== Early life ==
Wyndham Lathem was born August 10, 1974. He completed his AB in biology at Vassar College (1992–96). He was a research technician at Rockefeller University from 1996 to 1998 in the laboratory of James E. Darnell, Jr., and earned his PhD from the University of Wisconsin–Madison in microbiology (2003) in the laboratory of Rod Welch.

== Career ==
Lathem was a post-doctoral fellow at Washington University School of Medicine in molecular microbiology from 2003 to 2007 in the laboratory of Bill Goldman, now professor and chair of microbiology and immunology at the University of North Carolina in Chapel Hill. Goldman described Lathem as "very competitive in terms of getting NIH [National Institutes of Health] funding for his work ... and is respected for high quality research".

Until his employment was terminated on August 4, 2017, Lathem was associate professor of microbiology-immunology in the Feinberg School of Medicine at Northwestern University. His research relates to how pathogenic bacteria, specifically Yersinia pestis, the Black Death plague, cause disease in human beings and how the bacterium has evolved over time. In 2016 he spoke at the University of North Carolina at Chapel Hill School of Medicine on "Your Own Worst Enemy: How Yersinia pestis Turns the Body Against Itself." In 2017, he presented on "From Mild to Murderous: How Yersinia pestis Evolved to Cause Pneumonic Plague".

== Arrest ==
In early August 2017, he and Andrew Warren were detained in connection with the July 27, 2017, fatal stabbing of Trenton Cornell-Duranleau that occurred at Lathem's apartment in Chicago. On August 4 Lathem turned himself in to police in Oakland, California, and Warren turned himself in to police in San Francisco. He was returned to Chicago on August 18. During the COVID-19 pandemic, Lathem's lawyers applied for bail, so he could assist in researching the virus, but his application was denied. Lathem was found guilty on October 7, 2021. On January 25, 2022, he was sentenced to 53 years in prison by Cook County Criminal Court Judge Charles Burns.
