= D. James Surmeier =

American neuroscientist

D. James "Jim" Surmeier (born December 7, 1951), an American neuroscientist and physiologist of note, is the Nathan Smith Davis Professor and Chair in the Department of Neuroscience at Northwestern University Feinberg School of Medicine. His research is focused on the cellular physiology and circuit properties of the basal ganglia in health and disease, primarily Parkinson's and Huntington's disease as well as pain.

== Education and career ==
Surmeier graduated summa cum laude from University of Idaho in 1975, with a double major in mathematics and psychology. He then received a master's degree in mathematics from the University of Oregon (1976) and a PhD in Physiology-Psychology from University of Washington (1983), where he worked in the lab of Arnold Towe. For his postdoctoral training, he worked with first, William Willis (1983-1985) and then Stephen Kitai (1986-1989). He then accepted a faculty position in the University of Tennessee, where he received tenure before moving to Northwestern University Feinberg School of Medicine in 1998. He was subsequently named the chair of Department of Physiology at the Northwestern University Feinberg School of Medicine in 2001.

== Research ==
Aa a graduate student, Surmeier characterized the physiological and anatomic heterogeneity in the slowly adapting proprioceptive neurons in the cat cuneate nucleus before going on to study the primate spinothalamic neurons and the effect of noxious thermal stimulation on their physiology. It was in Kitai's lab that he first became interested in the basal ganglia and started investigating the effects of dopamine in the brain, a fundamental question that has driven a lot of his subsequent research as an independent scientist.

By mid-90s, despite widespread consensus regarding the clinical relevance of striatal dopaminergic signaling, the distribution and segregation of different classes of dopamine receptors, into either the same or distinct neuronal populations was unclear and remained widely debated. In pioneering experiments, using patch clamp recordings in conjunction with single cell gene profiling through RT-PCR, Surmeier reconciled the seemingly confounding results from anatomical and functional studies by showing that the direct (striatonigral) and indirect pathway (striatopallidal) striatal projection neurons predominantly expressed either the D1 or D2 dopamine receptors. Following this discovery, using pharmacology and spike-timing-dependent plasticity (STDP) protocols in genetically identified D1 or D2 receptor expressing neurons, Surmeier elucidated the distinct roles played by both the receptors in the induction of long-term potentiation and depression at the cortico-striatal synapses. Simultaneously, he also showed that in projection neurons that do not express the D2 receptors, synaptic depression dependent on D2 receptor activation is mediated by D2 receptors in cholinergic neurons, M1 muscarinic receptor activation resulting in reduced calcium channel, CaV1.3 opening in projection neurons and endocannabinoid signaling. Understanding the opposing effects of D1 and D2 receptor signaling and the consequent insights into the dopaminergic modulation of bi-directional synaptic plasticity in the direct and indirect spiny neurons was a conceptual advance that has proven fundamental to understanding striatal function in both behavioral adaptation as well as Parkinson's disease pathology, and continues to provide a foundation for current models of how dopamine controls striatal circuitry.

Around the same time, using multi-disciplinary approaches, his lab provided a possible explanation for the striatopallidal pathway dysfunction associated with Parkinson's disease and dopamine depletion by demonstrating a calcium channel (CaV1.3) dependent loss of excitatory synapses in the indirect pathway spiny neurons in a rodent model of the disease. Loss of striatal dopamine results in decreased M4 (muscarinic acetylcholine auto receptor) signaling along with an up-regulation of RGS4 (regulators of G protein signaling) expression in cholinergic neurons, culminating in increased cholinergic tone. Following dopamine depletion leading to increase in striatal acetylcholine levels, M1 muscarinic receptor activation in the indirect pathway spiny neurons results in down-regulation of dendritic potassium channels, Kir2, elevating the dendritic excitability and consequently the impact of synaptically released glutamate in these neurons. Surmeier's work characterizing the corticostriatal and thalamostriatal synapses as well as the firing pattern of striatal cholinergic interneurons provides a potential mechanism for an important behavioral neuroscience problem of how salient external stimuli suppress ongoing behavior and direct attention. The dopamine modulated cholinergic burst-pause firing pattern depends on thalamic activation and results in M2 (muscarinic acetylcholine) receptor mediated presynaptic inhibition of glutamatergic transmission and M1 (muscarinic acetylcholine) receptor mediated enhanced D2 neuronal excitability. As a result, the response of the "no-go" pathway (D2 receptor expressing striatopallidal neurons) to depolarizing cortical input is enhanced, providing a potential neural substrate for attentional shift. Collectively, work from Surmeier's lab suggests that not only dopamine but acetylcholine also has differential effects on striatal projection neurons furthering the idea that striatal dopamine/acetylcholine balance is a potential target for therapeutic intervention in diseases marked by striatal dysfunction and sheds light on how striatal neurons and circuits both change and adapt in response to disease states.

Surmeier's work to functionally dissect the direct and indirect pathway striatal projection neurons and characterizing their response to dopamine not only confirmed the transcriptomal dichotomy between these two classes of projection neuron but also defined for the first time how dopamine and acetylcholine differentially modulated their intrinsic excitability through G-protein coupled receptors. In his later career, Surmeier has pioneered the application of two-photon laser scanning microcopy to brain slice recordings to study dendritic physiology and synaptic plasticity of striatal neurons in Parkinson's disease, levodopa-induced dyskinesia, Huntington's disease and chronic pain. These studies have revealed how dopamine controls striatal synaptic plasticity, complementing earlier work focusing on short-term intrinsic excitability. Of note is the discovery that striatal projection neurons manifest forms of homeostatic plasticity that serve to normalize basal ganglia function despite ongoing disease pathology, particularly in Parkinson's disease.

Another major contribution of Surmeier is the characterization of the electrophysiological phenotypes of neurons at-risk in Parkinson's disease. Using a combination of patch clamp electrophysiology and two photon laser scanning microscopy to monitor key intracellular variables like Ca2+ concentration, mitochondrial redox status and cytosolic ATP levels, these studies have found that a wide array of neurons at-risk in Parkinson's disease – substantia nigra dopaminergic neurons, locus ceruleus adrenergic neurons, dorsal motor nucleus of the vagus cholinergic neurons and pedunculopontine cholinergic neurons – have a similar and distinctive physiological phenotype that creates basal oxidant stress in mitochondria. Oxidant stress has long been hypothesized to be a driver of pathogenesis in Parkinson's disease but it was not recognized that oxidant stress was a feature of healthy, at-risk neurons, reflecting an ancient a feed-forward control mechanism of mitochondrial respiration driven by plasma membrane Ca2+ channels with a Cav1 pore-forming subunit.

This connection between physiological phenotype and Parkinson's disease was subsequently confirmed by epidemiological studies showing that human use of negative allosteric modulators of Cav1 channels (dihydropyridines) was associated with a significant reduction in risk of developing Parkinson's disease. These combined observations motivated Phase 2 and now Phase 3 clinical trials with the dihydropyridine isradipine; this 5-year trial will be completed in late 2018. If successful, isradipine would be the first disease modifying therapy for Parkinson's disease.

== Selected awards and honors ==
- 2020, 2001 - Jacob Javits Neuroscience Investigator Award
- 2016 - C. David Marsden Presidential Lecture Award by the International Parkinson and Movement Disorder Society, F.E. Bennett Memorial Lectureship
- 2014 - The Janet Davison Rowley Patient Impact Research Award
- 2009 - Member, American Association for the Advancement of Science
- 2004 - Picower Foundation award, The William & Carmela Riker Memorial Lecture
- 1996 - NARSAD Distinguished Investigator
