= Bill Goldman (microbiologist) =

William E. Goldman is an American microbiologist whose research has focused on the molecular pathogenesis of bacterial and fungal infections, particularly diseases affecting the respiratory system. His research has included studies of Histoplasma capsulatum, the bacterium that causes plague, and Bordetella pertussis, the causative agent of pertussis. His work has examined microbial virulence, host–pathogen interactions, and the mechanisms by which respiratory pathogens establish infection and cause disease.

Goldman is professor emeritus of microbiology and immunology at the University of North Carolina at Chapel Hill (UNC). He previously served as chair of UNC's Department of Microbiology and Immunology from 2008 to 2018. Before joining UNC, he spent about 25 years at the Washington University School of Medicine in St. Louis, where he was a professor of molecular microbiology.

== Education and academic career ==
Goldman received a B.S. from Indiana University Bloomington in 1976 and a Ph.D. from the University of North Carolina at Chapel Hill in 1980. He subsequently held a National Research Service Award postdoctoral fellowship from 1981 to 1983.

Goldman joined the faculty of Washington University School of Medicine, where he became a professor of molecular microbiology. His research there included work on the pathogenic fungus Histoplasma capsulatum and on respiratory bacterial pathogens. His laboratory developed molecular approaches for investigating fungal virulence and examined the interaction of microbial pathogens with host tissues.

In 2008, Goldman joined the faculty of the University of North Carolina at Chapel Hill. He served as chair of the Department of Microbiology and Immunology from 2008 to 2018 and subsequently continued his research and teaching in the department.

Goldman served as chair of the Department of Microbiology and Immunology at the University of North Carolina at Chapel Hill from 2008 to 2018. During this period he continued to lead research in microbial pathogenesis while overseeing the department's academic activities.

Goldman served as a senior editor of the journal Molecular Microbiology from 2001 to 2008. He also chaired scientific meetings in microbial pathogenesis, including a FASEB Summer Research Conference in 2000 and a Gordon Research Conference in 2002.

He served as president of the Association of Medical School Microbiology and Immunology Chairs from 2017 to 2018.

== Research ==
Goldman's research has focused on the molecular mechanisms underlying microbial virulence and host responses to infection. His laboratory has investigated fungal and bacterial pathogens using molecular genetics, microbiology, cell biology, and experimental models of infection.

=== Histoplasma ===
A major part of Goldman's research concerned Histoplasma capsulatum, a pathogenic fungus that can cause pulmonary and disseminated histoplasmosis. His laboratory investigated the yeast phase of the organism, its ability to survive within host cells, and genetic and cellular factors involved in fungal virulence.

Goldman and his collaborators developed molecular genetic methods for studying Histoplasma, including techniques for genetic transformation and analysis of genes associated with virulence. Their work examined the role of cell-wall α-(1,3)-glucan in the pathogenicity of the fungus.

Later research from Goldman's laboratory examined differences among genetically distinct Histoplasma strains. A 2014 study led by researchers at UNC compared phylogenetically distinct strains and identified differences in their virulence strategies. The study was supported by National Institutes of Health grants awarded to Goldman.

=== Pertussis ===
Goldman's research also examined the molecular pathogenesis of Bordetella pertussis. His work investigated bacterial factors involved in respiratory disease, including tracheal cytotoxin and its effects on the respiratory tract. Earlier studies examined interactions between bacterial products and respiratory epithelial cells and mechanisms contributing to airway inflammation.

=== Pneumonic plague ===
A later major focus of Goldman's research was primary pneumonic plague caused by Yersinia pestis. His laboratory investigated the progression of infection in the lungs, bacterial factors required for virulence, and the host inflammatory response.

In a 2005 study, Goldman and colleagues developed a mouse model of primary pneumonic plague and examined bacterial transcriptional activity during disease progression. The study identified distinct stages of infection, including an early period in which the bacteria multiplied extensively before the development of pronounced inflammatory disease.

Subsequent studies from Goldman's laboratory examined mechanisms by which Y. pestis establishes a permissive environment in the lung. A 2012 study found that infection rapidly produced a localized anti-inflammatory state that permitted extensive bacterial proliferation during the early phase of pneumonic plague.

His research also examined the host inflammatory response to pneumonic plague. A 2015 study investigated spatially distinct neutrophil responses within infected lung tissue, while later work examined the inhibition of neutrophil granule release during pulmonary infection.

Goldman's laboratory also investigated bacterial factors that contribute to pneumonic plague. Research published in 2007 identified a plasminogen-activating protease as a factor specifically controlling the development of primary pneumonic plague.

== Recognition ==
Goldman was elected a Fellow of the American Academy of Microbiology in 2002 and a Fellow of the American Association for the Advancement of Science in 2012. He received the Burroughs Wellcome Fund Scholar Award in Molecular Pathogenic Mycology for 1996–2001.

== Selected publications ==
- Cookson, Brad T.; Tyler, Andrew N.; Goldman, William E. (21 February 1989). "Primary structure of the peptidoglycan-derived tracheal cytotoxin of Bordetella pertussis". Biochemistry. 28 (4): 1744–1749. doi:10.1021/bi00430a048. ISSN 0006-2960. PMID 2541765.
- Woods, Jon P.; Goldman, William E. (1992). "In vivo generation of linear plasmids with addition of telomeric sequences by Histoplasma capsulatum". Molecular Microbiology. 6 (23): 3603–3610. doi:10.1111/j.1365-2958.1992.tb01796.x. ISSN 0950-382X. PMID 1474902.
- Heiss, L N; Lancaster, J R; Corbett, J A; Goldman, W E (4 January 1994). "Epithelial autotoxicity of nitric oxide: role in the respiratory cytopathology of pertussis". Proceedings of the National Academy of Sciences. 91 (1): 267–270. Bibcode:1994PNAS...91..267H. doi:10.1073/pnas.91.1.267. ISSN 0027-8424. PMC 42928. PMID 7506415.
- Flak, Tod A.; Goldman, William E. (1999). "Signalling and cellular specificity of airway nitric oxide production in pertussis". Cellular Microbiology. 1 (1): 51–60. doi:10.1046/j.1462-5822.1999.00004.x. ISSN 1462-5814. PMID 11207540.
- Sebghati, Tricia Schurtz; Engle, Jacquelyn T.; Goldman, William E. (17 November 2000). "Intracellular Parasitism by Histoplasma capsulatum : Fungal Virulence and Calcium Dependence". Science. 290 (5495): 1368–1372. Bibcode:2000Sci...290.1368S. doi:10.1126/science.290.5495.1368. ISSN 0036-8075. PMID 11082066.
- Rappleye, Chad A.; Engle, Jacquelyn T.; Goldman, William E. (21 May 2004). "RNA interference in Histoplasma capsulatum demonstrates a role for α-(1,3)-glucan in virulence". Molecular Microbiology. 53 (1): 153–165. doi:10.1111/j.1365-2958.2004.04131.x. ISSN 0950-382X. PMID 15225311.
- Rappleye, Chad A.; Eissenberg, Linda Groppe; Goldman, William E. (23 January 2007). "Histoplasma capsulatum α-(1,3)-glucan blocks innate immune recognition by the β-glucan receptor". Proceedings of the National Academy of Sciences. 104 (4): 1366–1370. Bibcode:2007PNAS..104.1366R. doi:10.1073/pnas.0609848104. ISSN 0027-8424. PMC 1783108. PMID 17227865.
- Beck, Moriah R.; DeKoster, Gregory T.; Cistola, David P.; Goldman, William E. (2009). "NMR structure of a fungal virulence factor reveals structural homology with mammalian saposin B". Molecular Microbiology. 72 (2): 344–353. doi:10.1111/j.1365-2958.2009.06647.x. ISSN 0950-382X. PMC 4876643. PMID 19298372.
