= Kathleen J. Green =

American cell biologist

- Citizenship: American
- Education: Pomona College, Washington University in St. Louis
- Scientific career
- Fields: Dermatology
- Workplaces: Northwestern University Feinberg School of Medicine
- Website: Kathleen J. Green Lab

Kathleen J. Green is a cell biologist whose research focuses on how cell-cell communication drives tissue form and function. She is the Joseph L. Mayberry Professor of Pathology and Toxicology and Professor of Dermatology at Northwestern University Feinberg School of Medicine in Chicago. She also serves as Associate Director of Basic Sciences at the Robert H. Lurie Comprehensive Cancer Center of Northwestern University.

== Education and early career ==
Green received her B.A. in Biology from Pomona College in Claremont, California. She went on to study with David L. Kirk at Washington University in St. Louis where she studied development in the model organism Volvox carteri. She obtained her PhD in Cell and Developmental Biology in 1982. After obtaining her PhD Green moved to Chicago where she carried out postdoctoral training at Northwestern University Medical School in the laboratory of Robert D. Goldman, whose work included the identification and characterization of the intermediate filament cytoskeleton. Toward the end of this time period, Dr. Green set out to clone, sequence and characterize desmoplakin, an essential molecule that links the intermediate filament cytoskeleton to intercellular junctions known as desmosomes. Her work on desmoplakin laid the foundation for an independent career beginning in 1987 as a faculty member in the Department of Pathology at Northwestern.

== Leadership and service ==
Green is the Deputy Editor-in Chief of the Journal of Cell Science.

== Awards and honors ==
- Honorary Member of the Society for Investigative Dermatology (2019)
- Tripartite Legacy Faculty Prize in Translational Science and Education, Northwestern University (2019)
- 26th David Martin Carter Mentor Award, American Skin Association (2018)
- Alexander von Humboldt Research Award (2015–16)
- Elected as Fellow of the American Society for Cell Biology (2017)
- Elected into the German National Academy of Sciences (Leopoldina). (2016)
- Tanioku Kihei Lectureship, Japanese Society for Investigative Dermatology (2006)
