= Mitra Hartmann =

Mitra J.Z. Hartmann is a professor of mechanical engineering and biomedical engineering at the Robert R. McCormick School of Engineering and Applied Science at Northwestern University. She specializes in robotics, sensory acquisition behaviors, sensorimotor integration, and neuroethology. Her lab focuses on understanding sensory signals produced by whiskers and applying similar principles to robotics.

== Career ==
Hartmann earned a B.S. in applied and engineering physics at Cornell University and a PhD in integrative neuroscience from the California Institute of Technology (Caltech). She was a computational neurobiology postdoc at Caltech and a bio-computing postdoc at the Jet Propulsion Lab. She joined the faculty at Northwestern in 2003 and won the McCormick School of Engineering Teacher of the Year Award in 2009, 2010, and 2011.

She became an American Institute for Medical and Biological Engineering Fellow in 2017 and is an editorial board member for the Journal of Neurophysiology, a programming committee member for the Barrels Society, and a National Institutes of Health SMI study section member.

== Research ==
Hartmann focuses on animal whiskers and how information about touch is sent from the whisker to the brain, and whether similar techniques could be applied to robots. In July 2017, she and her team authored a paper analyzing how artificial whiskers could be added to robots, allowing them to map their environment by touch rather than sight.

This is multi-disciplinary research and her lab is made up of neuroscientists, mechanical engineers, biomedical engineers, and civil engineers, among others. In April 2021, she published a paper in PLOS Computational Biology about how whiskers bend in an S shape when whisking and signals are transmitted from the base of the follicle, activated when the whisker is pushed against it, to the brain. This research may eventually be able to be applied to helping people with brain injuries or who have suffered from strokes regain the ability to walk.

She currently holds four patents:

- Sensing device with whisker elements (US 7,774,951, 2010)
- Object profile sensing (US 8,109,007, 2012)
- Sensing device with whisker elements (US 8,448,514, 2013)
- Systems, methods, and apparatus for reconstruction of 3-D object morphology, position, orientation and texture using an array of tactile sensors (US 8,504,500, 2013)
