= Kate Green (producer) =

Canadian producer and director

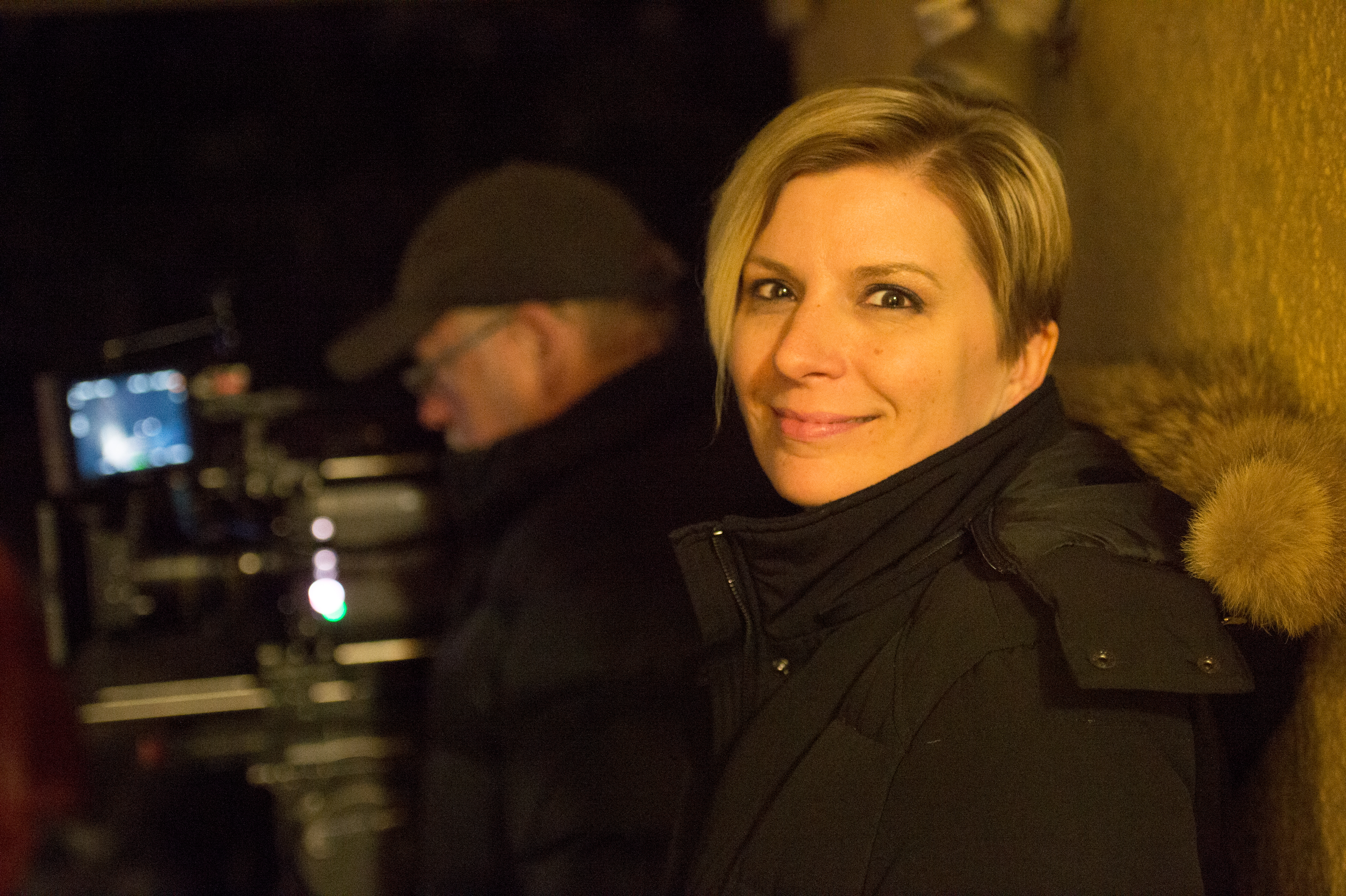
Kate Green in February 2021

Kate Green is a Canadian producer and director, who created the Canadian web series Narcoleap.

== Career ==
Green created the Canadian web series Narcoleap, which tells the story of college student Kelsey Atkins, who unexpectedly begins to leap into the bodies of other people during her bouts of narcolepsy, which leads her to become a target in the deadly world of military espionage. The series stars Chelsey Reist, Madison Smith, Austin Eckhert, Nicole Oliver, Aleks Paunovic, Cameron Bancroft, and Nhi Do, and is loosely based on the original concept by Donald Auger. Green specifically wanted to produce a female-driven sci-fi series, combining that genre with a coming-of-age story.

The series premiered on YouTube on July 15, 2018, and was then released across Canada simultaneously on TELUS Optik TV, and CBC GEM on August 1, 2018. Season one of Narcoleap was proudly funded by the Independent Production Fund, TELUS STORYHIVE, and Creative BC, and was developed through the Women In The Director's Chair (WIDC) program. Season two, distributed by HG Distribution, premiered on Highball TV on November 8, 2020, and was proudly funded by the Canada Media Fund, and the Bell Media Fund.

Green completed her Series Producer apprenticeship on the first season of Still Standing for CBC, and has worked as a producer or director on numerous television programs including W Network's Shannon & Sophie, CBC's Keeping Canada Alive & Keeping Canada Safe, W Network's Game of Homes, HGTV's Urban Suburban, Strangers in Danger for Fuel TV, and Truth, Dance and Reconciliation for CBC/APTN. She has also produced several award winning short films including Joanna Makes a Friend, Funny Business, Uniforms, and the short drama thriller Shadowplay.

Her first documentary as a director, Not A Stranger, won the Audience Choice Award at the Vancouver Short Film Festival and was nominated for Best ‘Made in Canada’ Short Film at the Northwestfest in Edmonton. Her second short documentary, Melting Stars, showed a virus wiping out a population of starfish. It screened at numerous festivals and picked up the ‘Best Short’ award at the International Wildlife Film Festival and was nominated for Best Short at Northwestfest Edmonton.

Green is an Alumna of the Women in the Director's Chair Story & Leadership Program, the National Screen Institute of Canada, Reykjavík International Film Festival Talent Lab, Vancouver Island University, and the University of British Columbia Entertainment Administration Program. In 2020, she was selected to participate in The Banff Spark Accelerator for Women in the Business of Media (Banff Spark), which aims to train Canadian women entrepreneurs to launch and grow their own businesses within screen-based industries.
