= Julia Barr =

American actress (born 1949)

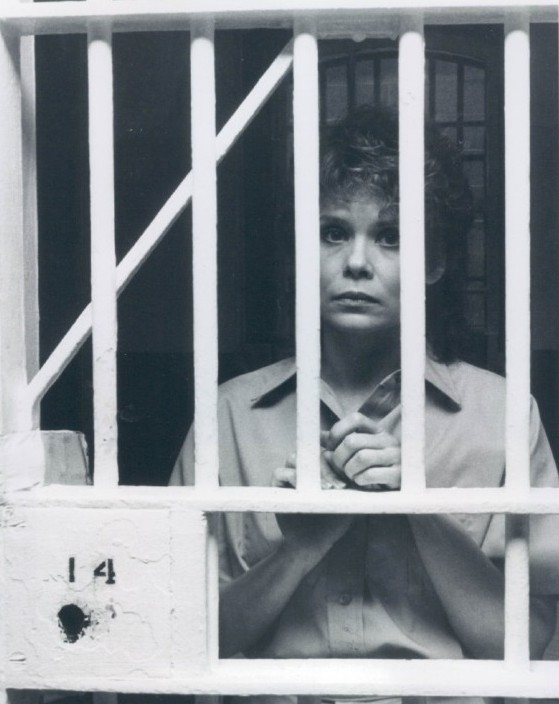
- Barr in All My Children (1977)
- Born: Julia Rose Buchheit; February 8, 1949 (age 77); Fort Wayne, Indiana, United States
- Spouse(s): Richard Barr (divorced); Richard Hirschlag (1982-present)
- Children: Allison

Julia Barr (born Julia Rose Buchheit on February 8, 1949, in Fort Wayne, Indiana) is an American actress. Barr is most famous for her role on the soap opera All My Children, playing the character of Brooke English. She played the role from 1976 to 1981 and from 1982 to December 20, 2006, with other special and short appearances.

Growing up as an only child in Fort Wayne, Barr made her acting debut at the age of 13 in a production of Peter Pan. This helped her decide to pursue acting as a career, and by the time she graduated from Indiana University-Purdue University Fort Wayne, she had performed in 25 professional productions. She spent two years at the Studio Arena Theater in Buffalo, New York.

== Career ==
Barr broke into soap operas with a short stint as bad girl Reenie Szabo on Ryan's Hope. She was invited to join the cast of All My Children as Brooke English, succeeding Elissa Leeds in the role. Her portrayal of Brooke garnered Barr eight Daytime Emmy Award nominations (1980, 1981, 1990, 1991, 1993, 1994, 1998 and 2001), winning the award in 1990 and again in 1998 for Outstanding Supporting Actress. Barr became close friends with noted actress Ruth Warrick, who portrayed her aunt Phoebe on the show until her death in 2005.

Barr took a 15-month break from the show beginning in 1981, during which time she toured with Katharine Hepburn and Dorothy Loudon in the national touring company of West Side Waltz. She returned to the show in 1982.

Despite fan outcry, Barr's airtime on AMC diminished in the early 2000s with her character Brooke only being used to further other characters story lines. In late 2006, executives at ABC did not renew Barr's contract, and offered her recurring status (without a guarantee of appearances). Barr declined. Fans of the show, and particularly Barr, were upset. Barr's contract officially expired in December 2006 and her last regular episode aired on December 20. The character was not given an exit and simply stopped appearing, which further fueled fan outrage.

In 2007, Barr teamed up her with All My Children co-star Jill Larson to produce and write a web series titled The Vindicated, which about three women, who are at a point in their lives in which they are without their male counterparts for different reasons. The project was written in 2007 and filmed in 2008. A final product is still in the works.

Barr returned to AMC for the soap's 40th anniversary on January 4 and 5, 2010. Barr again returned to AMC in February 2010 for a brief stint coinciding with the retirement of David Canary (Adam Chandler) on April 23, 2010.

Barr's final return to All My Children as Brooke English was in September 2011 in the final episodes of the show's ABC run. It was announced in February 2013 that she would appear as Brooke on the show's online revival. On April 29, 2013, it was confirmed that the show had been revived, with Barr playing the role of Brooke English. All My Children ended again in November 2013.

== Personal life ==
Barr's first marriage, to Richard Barr, ended in divorce. She met her second husband, Richard Hirschlag, in a musical comedy class. Barr married Hirschlag on Valentine's Day 1982 in a Manhattan brownstone. Together they have a daughter named Allison who is also an actress; she briefly appeared as Lizzie Spaulding on Guiding Light.

Barr is an advocate of animal rights and spokesperson for the Fund for Animals. She recorded a Christmas album in 2002, From Our House...To Yours, to raise money for The Fund For Animals.

Barr is a spokesperson for First Step, a job-readiness program, as part of the Coalition for the Homeless in New York City.

== Awards ==
=== Won ===
- Daytime Emmy Awards: 1990, Outstanding Supporting Actress in a Drama Series for All My Children
- Daytime Emmy Awards: 1998, Outstanding Supporting Actress in a Drama Series for All My Children
- Soap Opera Digest Awards: 1991, Outstanding Supporting Actress: Daytime for All My Children

=== Nominated ===
- Daytime Emmy Awards
  - (1980) Daytime Emmy Award for Outstanding Actress in a Drama Series
  - (1981) Daytime Emmy Award for Outstanding Actress in a Drama Series
  - (1991) Daytime Emmy Award for Outstanding Lead Actress in a Drama Series
  - (1993) Daytime Emmy Award for Outstanding Lead Actress in a Drama Series
  - (1994) Daytime Emmy Award for Outstanding Lead Actress in a Drama Series
  - (2001) Daytime Emmy Award for Outstanding Lead Actress in a Drama Series
- Soap Opera Digest Awards
  - (1990) Soap Opera Digest Award for Outstanding Lead Actress: Daytime
  - (1992) Soap Opera Digest Awards for Outstanding Lead Actress: Daytime
  - (2003) Soap Opera Digest Awards for Outstanding Lead Actress
