= Sabretooth (film) =

- DVD cover
- Written by: Scott Vandiver; Tom Woosley
- Directed by: James D.R. Hickox
- Starring: David Keith; Jenna Gering; Josh Holloway
- Music by: Igor
- Country of origin: United States
- Original language: English

Production
- Producer: Phil Botana
- Cinematography: Anthony B. Richmond
- Editor: Dan Rae
- Running time: 90 minutes

Original release
- Network: Sci Fi Channel
- Release: November 16, 2002

Sabretooth is a 2002 made for television science-fiction-horror film directed by James D.R. Hickox. When a genetically engineered saber-toothed tiger escapes from containment into a forest and starts killing a group of campers, a billionaire and the scientist that created the creature hire a big-game hunter to find it. It premiered as a Sci Fi Pictures TV-movie on the Sci Fi Channel on November 16, 2002.

== Plot ==
Using fossilized DNA, a scientist clones a prehistoric sabretooth tiger. However, one night, as a janitor prepares to clean the sabretooth's residential quarters, he is subsequently killed after carelessly locking himself in the cage with it. As the fearsome creature is being transported, it breaks free and kills the driver before stalking human prey. Taking its spree into the forested mountains in the Pacific Northwest, the beast kills a vacationing couple before stalking a group of trainee guides learning the area from seniors.

Catherine Viciy (Vanessa Angel), the scientist who created it, and her colleague Anthony Bricklin (John Rhys-Davies), call in Robert Thatcher (David Keith), a big game hunter and tracker, to find the animal, tricking him into believing that it is an African lion, and will offer to pay him $50,000. They go into the mountains to find the cat and come across the cabin where the vacationers were killed. At this point, Thatcher states that "your kitty has an attitude problem." Catherine throws away Thatcher's satellite phone, knowing that he had planned to notify the police and Animal Control. As they continue through the woods, the sabretooth kills Kara, a zoologist working for Catherine, and Thatcher decides to take matters into his own hands and declares that he will kill the sabretooth no matter what.

The next day, Thatcher sees signs of the trainees and the sabretooth's tracks corresponding. One night, he hears a camper scream and leaves camp to investigate. He finds the camper's remains and later relates his fate to Casey, the group leader, who was searching for him. After they return to the group's camp, Trent, another senior guide, comes in screaming about the death of another trainee and about seeing a sabretooth, to much shock and disbelief. Instructing Casey and the others to a nearby mine to wait for him, Thatcher goes after it, but before he can kill it, Catherine attempts to tranquilize it and misses, scaring it off. Thatcher is fired for trying to kill it instead of catching it, because of all the scientific progress the creature would bring. Still, the sabretooth reappears and slowly kills Anthony, allowing Thatcher and Catherine time to escape.

Though Catherine steals his revolver, Thatcher recovers his rifle and they head for the mine, where only Casey and Trent remain alive, and where the sabretooth has Trent trapped. Thatcher hands Catherine his rifle and tells her to shoot the sabretooth in case it gets past him, then he heads to an opening at the top of the mine. He and Casey tranquilize the sabretooth, and Trent escapes. After they are all outside, Thatcher sends them on and tries to kill the sabretooth, but discovers that Catherine has unloaded his rifle. As he runs away, he falls and catches his foot in a bear trap. Casey and Trent see him and, after making spears from saplings, return to a lake where they find Catherine.

After striking Catherine down for nearly getting him killed, Thatcher prepares to go kill the sabretooth once more, but Catherine draws his revolver on him, telling him that she does not want to see her creation destroyed. Before she can kill him, Trent kicks the gun out of her hand, but is shot. The revolver slides down the cliff, and the sabretooth reappears. Catherine tries to warn the beast off, but her creation kills her. Thatcher tricks the sabretooth into jumping on his spear and throws it down a ledge, killing it. Later, Thatcher, Casey, and Trent head back to the summer camp where Casey works.

== Cast ==
- David Keith as Robert Thatcher, a professional big-game hunter and tracker who is hired to catch the sabretooth and ultimately kills it with a spear after its creator, Catherine, unloads his rifle.
- Jenna Gering as Casey Ballenger, the leader of the group of campers in Sierra Nevada who had a relationship with Trent in the past, whom she gets back together with towards the end of the film, and one of the two campers who survives the sabretooth rampage.
- Josh Holloway as Trent Parks, an experienced camper who had a relationship with Casey in the past, which he resumes towards the end of the film, having come back only to do so, but showed interest in Lola Rodriguez, even being brought to tears when she died. He, along with Casey, is one of the two campers to survive the sabretooth rampage.
- Vanessa Angel as Catherine Viciy, an ambitious, but cold-hearted scientist who had a relationship with Thatcher in the past and who created the sabretooth and was willing to sacrifice anyone necessary to keep it alive, only to be the final victim of her own creation.
- John Rhys-Davies as Anthony Bricklin, Catherine's partner, a greedy, but cowardly man who only wanted the sabretooth to be left alive for monetary and glory purposes, but was killed by it after having his eyes gouged out.
- Lahmard Tate as Leon Tingle, the final camper killed by the sabretooth, as well as the bravest, who faced the sabretooth in physical combat and tried to kill it with knives, but was stabbed in the chest by its claws.
- Nicole Tubiola as Lola Rodriguez, a camper, the only other female camper besides Casey whose death confirmed the existence of the sabretooth. She was romantically involved with Trent throughout the film and screamed to him for help when she was killed. He seemed to share her feelings as he cried when he could not save her.
- Phillip Glasser as Jason Kimble, a camper, the first camper killed by the sabretooth after getting lost at night.
- Stefanie Thomas as Kara Harmon, a zoologist on Catherine's team who at first goes along with Catherine's lie about the sabretooth, but ultimately chooses to tell Thatcher the truth, only to be killed by the sabretooth before she could.
- Todd Jensen as Sean, he and his girlfriend Amanda are spending time at a cabin in the woods. Until they are both attacked by the sabertooth.
- Allie Moss as Amanda, her and her boyfriend Sean are vacationing in a cabin in the woods. They are both killed by the sabretooth.
- Scott Vandiver as Nathan, a janitor at the laboratory where the sabretooth was created. He was the first victim killed by the sabretooth after carelessly locking himself in with it after its cage doesn't close.
- Kelly Nelson as Billy, he is the truck driver transporting the sabertooth to Anthony and Catherine. He crashes the truck and the metal crate holding the sabertooth is ripped open. The sabertooth quickly kills him.
- James D.R. Hickox as Bob "Silent Bob", he is the mute brother of the gas station attendant. He hears the sabertooth inside the metal crate in the back of the truck it is being transported in.

== Reception ==
On the film-critics aggregator site Rotten Tomatoes. Sabretooth scored 20% positive reviews, out of 5 reviews.

== Sequel ==
A standalone sequel titled Attack of the Sabretooth was released in 2005, like its predecessor, the sequel was also a Sci Fi Channel television film. It was directed by George Miller starred Brian Wimmer, Stacy Haiduk, Nicholas Bell, Robert Carradine, Parry Shen, Natalie Avital, and Billy Aaron Brown.
