= Emme Rylan =

American actress

- Other name: Emme Marcy Rylan
- Occupation: Actress
- Years active: 2005–present
- Known for: Guiding Light as Lizzie Spaulding; The Young and the Restless as Abby Newman; General Hospital as Lulu Spencer
- Partner: Don Money (2007–present)
- Children: 3

Emme Marcy Rylan is an American actress. From 2005 until 2013, she was credited as Marcy Rylan. She is recognized for her portrayals on the CBS soap operas Guiding Light as Lizzie Spaulding and The Young and the Restless as Abby Newman. From 2013 to 2020, she portrayed the role of Lulu Spencer on ABC's General Hospital.

== Career ==
Rylan joined the cast of Guiding Light as Lizzie Spaulding on February 7, 2006, taking over the role from Crystal Hunt, until the finale on September 18, 2009. She won the role of Winnie Harper in the straight-to-video 2006 cheerleading film Bring It On: All or Nothing in which she co-starred with fellow Guiding Light alumna Hayden Panettiere. She was a guest star on the Nickelodeon show Drake & Josh and appeared in several national network commercials.

After CBS announced the cancellation of Guiding Light, Rylan joined The Young and the Restless as Abby Newman. Her first airdate was May 18, 2010. She was later absent from the soap during the 2011 holiday season due a maternity leave. In September 2012, it was announced Rylan had been let go from The Young and the Restless due to budgetary cuts.

She made her final appearance on October 23, 2012; she later returned to the role from February 11 to April 10, 2013, when she ultimately left the role; she was recast with actress Melissa Ordway. On March 6, 2013, it was announced that Rylan would join the cast of General Hospital as Lulu Spencer, replacing Julie Marie Berman. On December 1, 2020, after increased speculation, Rylan exited the role. She has also played Bethany Gina Roman-Quinn in the audio drama Montecito (series start date: April 22, 2025).

== Personal life ==
Rylan graduated from Tyrone Area High School in Tyrone, Pennsylvania in 1999 and the Grier School. She and her long-term significant other Don Money have three children — two sons and a daughter.

== Filmography ==
=== Film ===
Year	Title	Role	Notes
2006	Armageddon for Andy	Bethany Hopkins	
2006	Bring It On: All or Nothing	Winnie	
2011	Impulse Black	Skyler Frost	Short
2011	History	Starlene	Short
2015	Shevenge	Sam	Short
2016	2BR02b	Leora Duncan	Short
2025	Chatter	Phoebe	Short

=== Television ===
Year	Title	Role	Notes
2005	Drake & Josh	Allie	"We're Married"
2006–2009	Guiding Light	Lizzie Spaulding	Series regular
2010–2013	The Young and the Restless	Abby Newman	Series regular (2010-2012) Recurring role (2013)
2011	$#*! My Dad Says	Rebecca	"Lock and Load"
2013	CSI: Crime Scene Investigation	Amy Phillips	"Dead of the Class"
2013–2020	General Hospital	Lulu Spencer	Series regular

Preceded by Crystal Hunt	Lizzie Spaulding (role); 2006–09	None
Preceded by Hayley Erin	Abby Newman (role); 2010–12; 2013	Succeeded by Melissa Ordway
Preceded by Julie Marie Berman	Lulu Spencer (role); 2013–2020	Succeeded by Alexa Havins
