= Donna Mills =

American actress (born 1940)

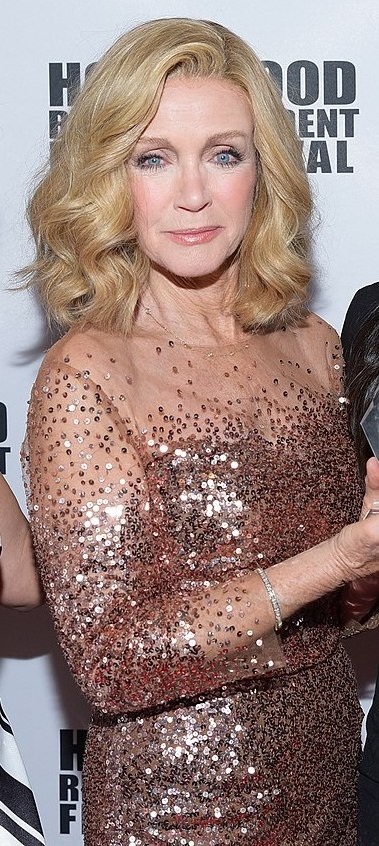
- Mills at the 2018 Hollywood Reel Independent Film Festival
- Born: Donna Jean Miller; December 11, 1940 (age 85); Chicago, Illinois, U.S.
- Education: University of Illinois Urbana-Champaign
- Occupation: Actress
- Years active: 1966–present
- Partner(s): Richard Holland (1979–1999); Larry Gilman (2001–present)
- Children: 1

Donna Mills (born Donna Jean Miller; December 11, 1940) is an American actress. She began her television career in 1966 with a recurring role on The Secret Storm, and in the same year appeared on Broadway in Woody Allen's comedy Don't Drink the Water. She made her film debut the next year in The Incident. She then starred for three years on the soap opera Love Is a Many Splendored Thing (1967–70), before starring as Tobie Williams, the girlfriend of Clint Eastwood's character in the 1971 thriller Play Misty for Me. Mills played the female lead in the heist film Murph the Surf (1975), and had starring roles in a number of made-for-television movies during the 1970s.

In 1980, Mills landed the role of Abby Cunningham on the primetime soap opera Knots Landing, and was a regular on the show until 1989. For this role, she won the Soap Opera Digest Award for Outstanding Villainess three times, in 1986, 1988, and 1989. She has since starred in several TV movies, including The World's Oldest Living Bridesmaid (1990), Dangerous Intentions (1995), The Stepford Husbands (1996), Ladies of the House (2008) and Ladies of the '80s: A Divas Christmas (2023). In 2014, she joined the cast of the long-running daytime soap opera General Hospital as Madeline Reeves, for which she won a Daytime Emmy Award for Outstanding Special Guest Performer in a Drama Series. In 2023, she starred in the Lifetime limited series V.C. Andrews' Dawn. Mills also appeared in the films Joy (2015), Nope (2022) and Origin (2023).

== Early life ==
Mills was born Donna Jean Miller in Chicago on December 11, 1940, to Bernice (née Lantz), a housewife, and Ambrose, a computer analyst for Union Oil. She has one brother, Donald, who is 10 years her senior. Raised in Norwood Park, Mills attended Garvy Elementary School and Taft High School; one of her classmates was Jim Jacobs, co-creator of Grease, who based the character of Sandy on her.

Mills attended the University of Illinois Urbana-Champaign where she was a member of Delta Gamma sorority. She completed one year of course work, then left to pursue a dancing career, gaining some stage experience in summer stock productions. Her first professional acting role was in a production of Come Blow Your Horn at the Drury Lane Theater in Chicago. She later was cast in a touring production of My Fair Lady, which brought her to New York City. Before she got a job on TV, Mills supported herself as a secretary at Popular Mechanics magazine.

Mills' parents retired to Florida, while her brother makes his home in Colorado.

== Career ==
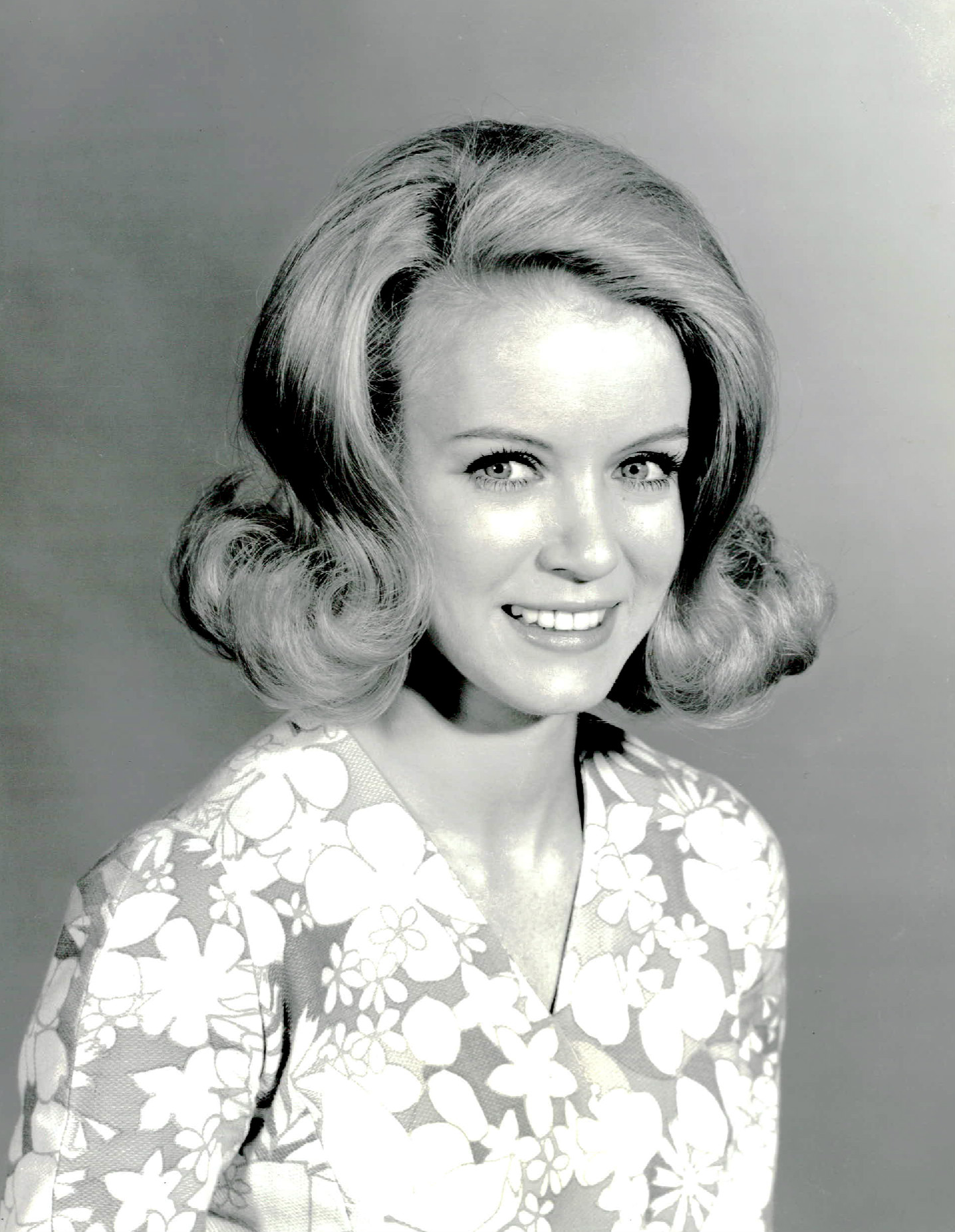
Mills in Love is a Many Splendored Thing (1967)

=== 1960s–1970s ===
Mills began her acting career on television playing a nightclub singer named Rocket on the Manhattan-based CBS daytime soap opera, The Secret Storm in 1966. She later appeared on Broadway in Woody Allen's comedy Don't Drink the Water as the Sultan of Bashir's wife. Following this, she made her big screen debut in the neo noir crime-thriller film, The Incident (1967), co-starring alongside Martin Sheen, Beau Bridges, Ed McMahon and Thelma Ritter. The film received positive reviews from critics and was successful in a box office. In the fall of 1967, Mills gained a regular role as ex-nun Laura Donnelly on the new CBS daytime soap opera, Love is a Many Splendored Thing. She left the series in 1970 and relocated to the West Coast, thereupon making her primetime TV debut in an episode of the Western series, Lancer.

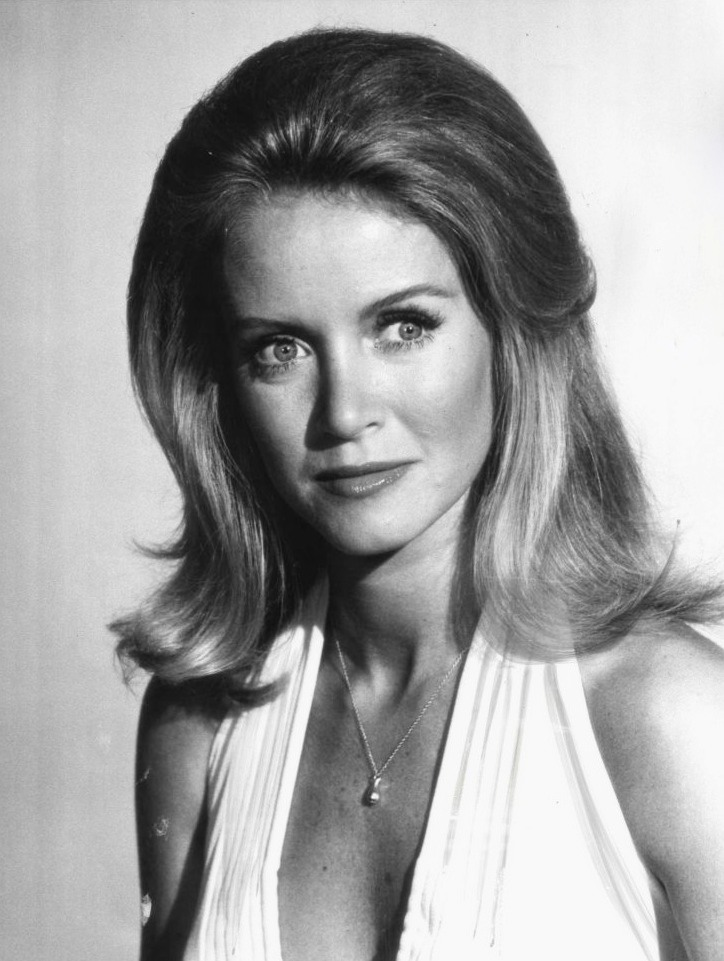
Mills in Police Story (1975)

In 1971, Mills starred alongside Clint Eastwood and Jessica Walter in the psychological thriller film Play Misty for Me, directed by Eastwood for Universal Pictures. The film received positive reviews from critics and was a financial success for the studio. During 1971–72, she starred in the short-lived sitcom The Good Life with Larry Hagman, who later guest-starred on Knots Landing as J. R. Ewing from the show's sister series Dallas. She signed a contract with Universal in 1972 and spent much of the 1970s appearing as a guest on top-rated television shows such as Gunsmoke, The Six Million Dollar Man, Hawaii Five-O, CHiPs, The F.B.I., Quincy, M.E., the UK's Thriller series, Police Woman, and Fantasy Island. She appeared in The Love Boat S1 E11 vignette "Silent Night" as Lila Barton, who stands by her wrongly imprisoned husband, played by John Gavin (1977).

Mills starred as a leading actress in a number of made-for-television movies through the 1970s. Her role in Play Misty for Me resulted in her being typecast as a damsel in distress for the next few years. She starred in Haunts of the Very Rich, Rolling Man and Night of Terror in 1972, was lead actress in The Bait (1973), Live Again, Die Again (1974), Beyond the Bermuda Triangle (1975), Curse of the Black Widow, The Hunted Lady and Woman on the Run in 1977, Bunco (1978), and co-starred in Who Is the Black Dahlia? (1975), Look What's Happened to Rosemary's Baby (1976), Smash-Up on Interstate 5 (1976), Fire! (1977), Superdome (1978) and Hanging by a Thread (1979). In 1975, she starred as the eponymous character's suicidal girlfriend in the American International Pictures heist film Murph the Surf opposite Don Stroud and Robert Conrad, based on a real jewel burglary involving surfer Jack Roland Murphy. In 1979, Mills returned to the Midwest to star opposite Joe Namath in a stage production of Picnic by the Kenley Players of Ohio.

In an era when TV was considered inferior to feature films, many had questioned Mills' decision to focus less on the latter medium. As the actress retrospectively explained to Soap Opera Digest in 1996, "if I had gotten some big [movie] roles, it would probably be all over by now. Movie careers don't last all that long, generally. But my television career has been terrific, so I can't say that I'm disappointed at all."

=== 1980s: Knots Landing ===
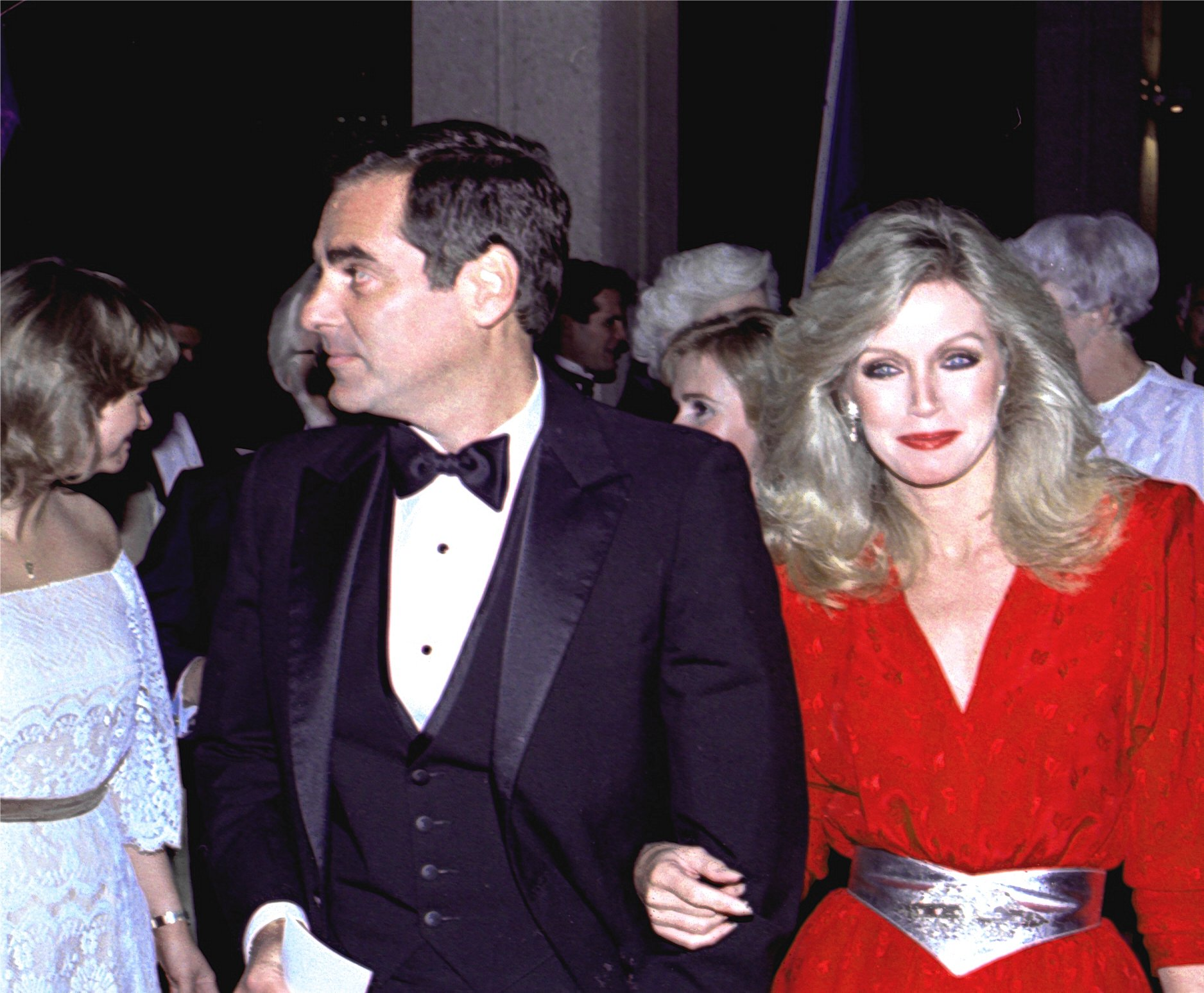
Mills in 1981

In 1980, Mills landed her most prominent role — that of scheming, manipulative vixen Abby Cunningham on the long-running primetime soap opera Knots Landing. In an interview with Jerry Buck for the Associated Press, Mills said: "I got tired of playing the victim. It's a more active role. Abby keeps things stirred up, and I like that." According to series creator David Jacobs, Abby was not planned when the show began. He knew that he wanted a female J.R. Ewing-esque character. However, he had a different sense of the character and who would wind up in the role. With Mills' reputation of playing the victim, he initially did not choose her for the part.

Josh Mapes of The Biography Channel listed her in the category "10 Primetime Stars We Love to Hate". He said, "Any great soap opera needs a great villain. While viewers may identify more with the protagonist, the villains in a serial drama always spice things up, cause trouble, and make it more fun to watch. From tongue lashings to catfights, underhanded tricks to boldface lies, the characters we love to hate have each brought a fair share of great moments to primetime soaps. While Larry Hagman played the bad guy on Dallas, Donna Mills played bad girl on its spin-off, Knots Landing. Unapologetically going after what she wanted, Mills' character engaged in affairs with two of the husbands on the Knots Landing cul-de-sac, but like most vixens on primetime soaps, she was only out for money, not love."

In 1989, Mills announced her intention to leave the long-running nighttime soap after nine years as Abby. According to Mills, she wanted to take a break from acting for a while, and from Abby, as well. In an interview with The Cedartown Standard, Mills explained: "I'm tired of the show. It's been too long. I'm not particularly happy with the way they've been writing Abby lately. She's too soft. I'd like Abby to get back to her old self." For this role, she won the Soap Opera Digest Award for Outstanding Villainess on three occasions, in 1986, 1988, and 1989, as well as a 1986 nomination for Outstanding Actress in a Leading Role on a Prime Time Serial.

During her time in Knots Landing, Mills also appeared in a number of other projects. In 1982, she starred alongside Genie Francis and Linda Evans in the CBS two-part miniseries Bare Essence, and in 1985 appeared in the CBS musical film Alice in Wonderland. She played the leading roles in the made-for-television movies He's Not Your Son (1984), Intimate Encounters (1986), Outback Bound (1988) and The Lady Forgets (1989).

=== 1990s–2000s ===
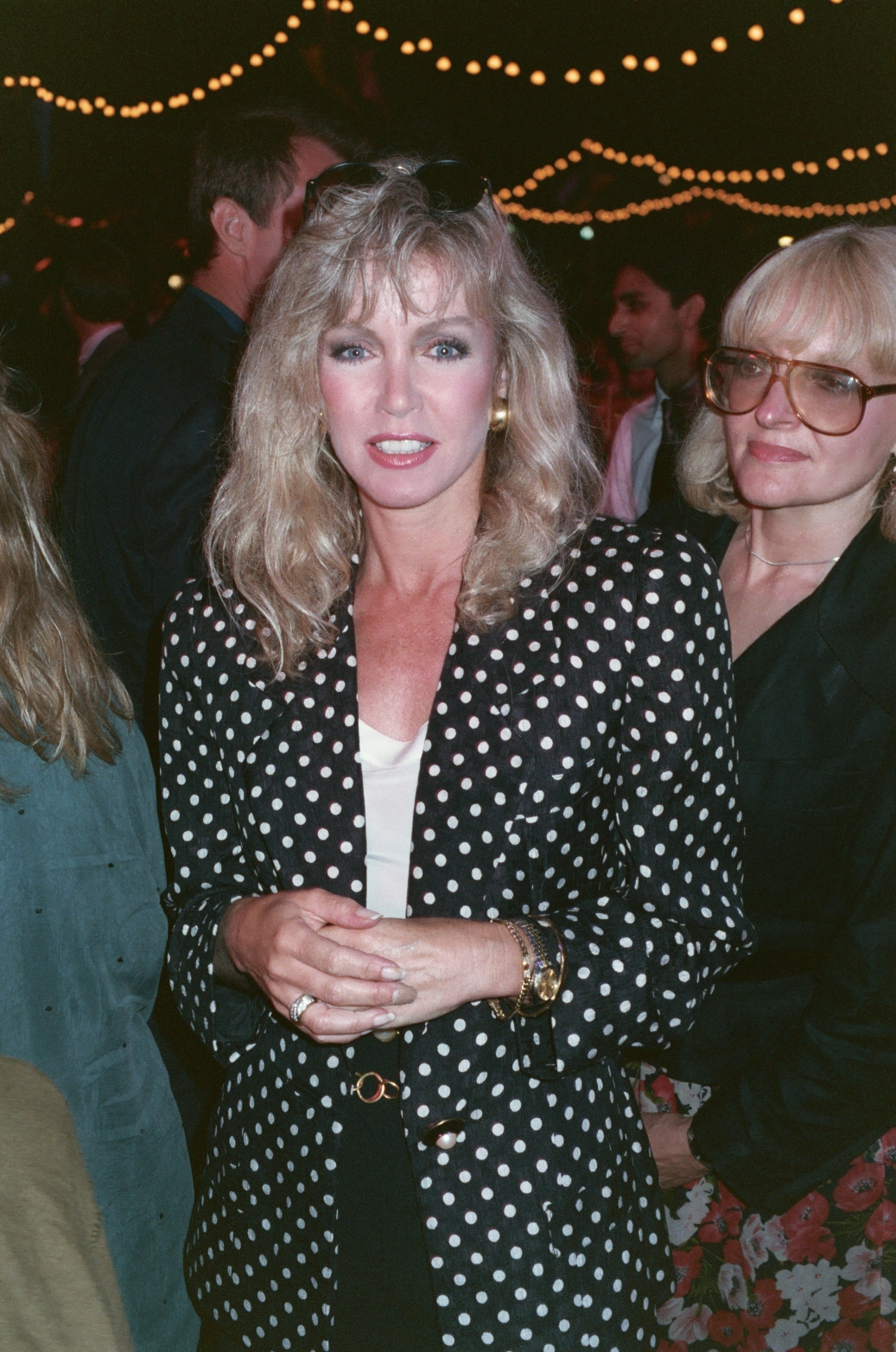
Mills at the premiere of Air America in 1990

After Knots Landing, Mills concentrated on television movies, several of which she co-produced under her company Donna Mills Productions: The World's Oldest Living Bridesmaid (1990), Runaway Father (1991), In My Daughter's Name (1992), My Name Is Kate (1994) and An Element of Truth (1995). She returned to Knots Landing for its final episode in 1993, and again for the reunion miniseries Knots Landing: Back to the Cul-de-Sac in 1997. In between, she had a brief recurring guest role as the mother of Jane Mancini (played by Josie Bissett) on Melrose Place from 1996 to 1997. Her other 1990s credits included the prison drama False Arrest (1991), The President's Child (1992) based on Fay Weldon's novel, Remember (1993) based on the novel by Barbara Taylor Bradford, the domestic violence-drama Dangerous Intentions (1995), inspired by the Ira Levin novel The Stepford Wives thriller The Stepford Husbands (1996), and the murder-mystery Moonlight Becomes You (1998) based on Mary Higgins Clark's novel. She also guest-starred in the television sitcoms The John Larroquette Show, Dream On, High Society and Rude Awakening.

After few years in semi-retirement, Mills continued to appear on television in movies and guest roles. In 2004, she starred as Mrs. Claus opposite George Hamilton in the Holiday comedy film A Very Cool Christmas. In 2005, she reunited with the Knots Landing cast for the nonfiction special, Knots Landing Reunion: Together Again, in which the stars reminisced about the show. In the mid-to-late-2000s, Mills appeared in various television movies such as Love Is A Four Letter Word in 2007 and Ladies of the House alongside Florence Henderson and Pam Grier in 2008, as well as guest appearances in series such as Cold Case (in a provocative role as a woman who seduces her grandson) and Nip/Tuck (guest-starring with fellow Knots Landing star Joan Van Ark).

=== 2010s–present ===
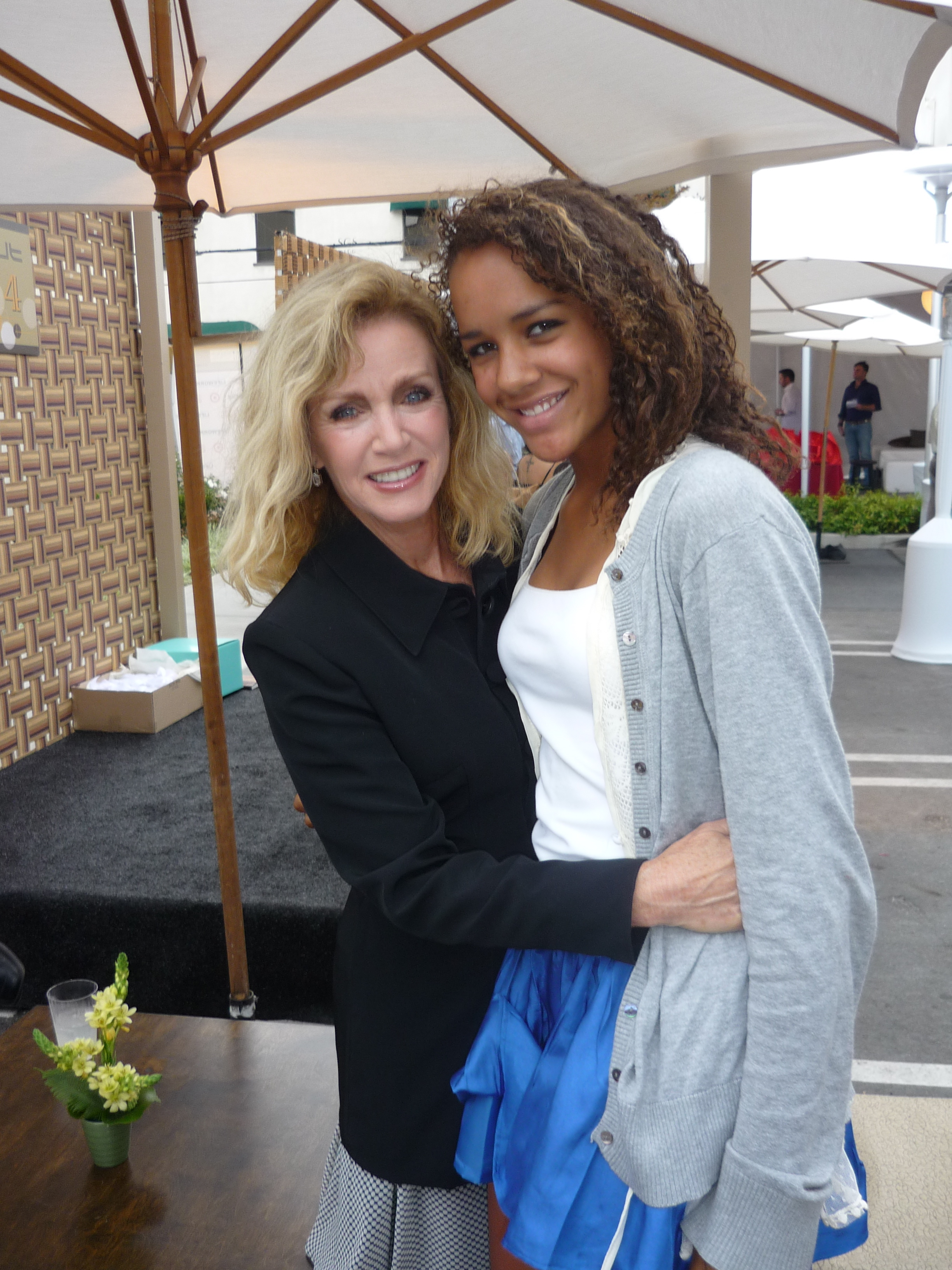
Mills with daughter Chloe in 2009

In 2012, she made a guest appearance in the ABC comedy series, GCB as Bitsy Lourd, Annie Potts' character nemesis and appeared as a guest judge on the reality series RuPaul's Drag U. The following year, she starred in the thriller film Deadly Revenge produced by MarVista Entertainment, and played a psychologist in the independent comedy-drama When Life Keeps Getting In The Way. In 2014, Mills made her return to daytime soap operas, for the first time since 1970. She was cast in a major recurring guest-starring role on ABC's General Hospital. She debuted in mid-March and stayed to May. Later that same year, she returned for another multiple-episode arc. At the 42nd Daytime Emmy Awards, Mills won Outstanding Special Guest Performer in a Drama Series for her performance in General Hospital, in a three-way tie with Fred Willard and Ray Wise. In August 2018, Mills returned for another multiple-episode arc. About her experience on soap she later said: “I loved everyone at General Hospital. I became good friends with Laura Wright (Carly), and [executive producer] Frank Valentini is just a doll. But the way they shoot soaps now is so hard. You might be shooting scenes for two or more episodes a day, and there’s no time to rehearse. It just wasn’t a very satisfying experience for me, as an actor.”

In 2015, Mills starred in the POP reality series Queens of Drama about a group of former stars who now produce a new primetime serial drama to star in. The ladies were required to work together in front of and behind the cameras as they developed, pitched, and produced their steamy series with the hopes of landing a pilot deal by the end of the season. Mills had a role in David O. Russell's film Joy, which was released in December 2015. Also in 2015, she starred in the holiday comedy-drama, 12 Gifts of Christmas for the Hallmark Channel.

In 2017, Mills was cast in the lead role of Daisy Werthan in the Colony Theatre's production of Alfred Uhry's Pulitzer Prize-winning play, Driving Miss Daisy. Also that year, she played a leading role in the Pure Flix streaming drama series, Hilton Head Island. In 2019, she starred alongside Dyan Cannon and Crystal Hunt in the Pure Flix comedy series Mood Swings. She also starred in the independent films Best Mom (2018), Turnover (2019), and A Beauty & the Beast Christmas (2019).

In 2022, Mills appeared in Jordan Peele's horror film Nope and received the Palm Springs International Film Festival Women In Film and Television's Above And Beyond Award. She also starred in the thriller film Abused alongside James Russo, Taryn Manning and Angie Stone. Later that year, she was cast in the Lifetime limited series, V.C. Andrews' Dawn as wicked grandmother Lillian Cutler. The series premiered in July 2023 due mixed reviews but her performance was praised. In January 2023, she guest starred in the ABC crime series, The Rookie: Feds making her first prime-time television series appearance in ten years. In 2023, Mills was cast in the Ava DuVernay' biographical drama film Origin based upon Caste: The Origins of Our Discontents by Isabel Wilkerson. It had its world premiere at the 80th Venice International Film Festival on September 6, 2023. Later in 2023, Mills starred alongside Loni Anderson, Morgan Fairchild, Linda Gray and her Knots Landing co-star Nicollette Sheridan in the Lifetime Christmas comedy film, Ladies of the '80s: A Divas Christmas.

In 2025, Mills reunited with KL co-stars Michele Lee and Joan Van Ark for the episodic podcast We're Knot Done Yet, available on streaming platforms such as Podbean, YouTube and Spotify.

On July 30, 2026, Mills announced she is joining OnlyFans to foster a "more personal and direct connection" with fans. Partnering with Creators INC, Mills plans to share everyday moments and behind-the-scenes content on her own terms. The decision follows a viral April 2026 Instagram video where she clapped back at age-shaming critics, aligning her with a growing trend of mainstream celebrities using the subscription platform for non-adult content.

== Personal life ==
Never married, Mills had an on-again-off-again relationship with advertising executive Richard Holland (former husband of singer Chaka Khan) for approximately 20 years beginning in 1979. She dated Intimate Encounters co-star Clayton Norcross during a break from Holland. In September 1994, Mills adopted a newborn baby, a daughter, Chloe. She has been in a relationship with Larry Gilman since 2001, and says their decision not to combine finances by marrying is "much cleaner, much better."

Mills appeared in non-nude cover photographs for the October 1987 and November 1989 editions of Playboy.

== Filmography ==
Key
†	Denotes works that have not yet been released

Year	Title	Role	Notes
1966	The Secret Storm	Rocket	Series regular
1967	The Incident	Alice Keenan	
1967–1970	Love Is a Many Splendored Thing	Laura Donnelly Elliott	Series regular
1970	Lancer	Lucy	1 episode
1970	Dan August	Edna Adams	1 episode
1971	Play Misty for Me	Tobie Williams	
1971	The F.B.I.	Maryanne	Season 6, Episode 23: "The Hitchhiker"
1971–1972	The Good Life	Jane Miller	Series regular, 15 episodes
1972	The F.B.I.	Bernie	Season 7, Episode 17: "The Break up"
1972	Haunts of the Very Rich	Laurie	ABC Movie of the Week
1972	Rolling Man	Bebe Lotter	ABC Movie of the Week
1972	Night of Terror	Linda Daniel	ABC Movie of the Week
1973	Gunsmoke	Cora Sanderson	Episodes: "A Game of Death... An Act of Love: Part 1" and "A Game of Death... An Act of Love: Part 2"
1973	The Bait	Tracy Fleming	ABC Movie of the Week
1973	Thriller	Chrissie Morton	Season 1, Episode 3: "Someone at the Top of the Stairs"
1974	Live Again, Die Again	Caroline Carmichael	ABC Movie of the Week
1974	Thriller	Helen Cook	Season 2, Episode 4: "One Deadly Owner"
1974	Marcus Welby, M.D.	Bea Averton	Episode: "A Fevered Angel"
1974	McMillan & Wife	Laura Rainey	Episode: "Buried Alive"
1975	The Six Million Dollar Man	Liza Leitman	Episode: "The Cross-Country Kidnap"
1975	Who Is the Black Dahlia?	Susan Winters	
1975	Murph the Surf	Ginny Eaton	
1975	Hawaii Five-O	Marcia Bissell	Episode: "Murder: Eyes Only'"
1975	Beyond the Bermuda Triangle	Claudia	
1975	Thriller	Patty Heron	Season 4, Episode 4: "The Killer With Two Faces"
1975	Cannon	Lena Michaels	Episode: "The Victim - S5E5"
1976	Police Woman	Tamee Swanson	Episode: "Mother Love"
1976	Quincy, M.E.	Roberta Rhodes	Episode: "A Star Is Dead"
1976	Look What's Happened to Rosemary's Baby	Ellen	
1976	Smash-Up on Interstate 5	Laureen	
1977	Bunco	Frankie	TV pilot
1977	Fire!	Harriett Malone	
1977	Curse of the Black Widow	Leigh Lockwood	
1977	The Hunted Lady	Susan Reilly	
1977	Woman on the Run	Laura Frazier	CBS Pilot.
1977	The Oregon Trail	Lizzie	Episode: "The Scarlet Ribbon"
1978	Superdome	Lainie Wiley	
1978	Doctors' Private Lives	Dr. Beth Demery	
1978	The Love Boat	Jeannie Carter	3 episodes
1979	Hanging by a Thread	Ellen Craig	
1979	Fantasy Island	Cindy Carter	Episode: "The Chain Gang/The Boss'"
1979	Young Maverick	Lila Gates	Episodes: "Dead Man's Hand: Part 1" and "Dead Man's Hand: Part 2"
1980	Waikiki	Cassie Howard	
1980–1989, 1993	Knots Landing	Abby Fairgate Cunningham Ewing Sumner	Series regular, 236 episodes
1982	Bare Essence	Barbara Fisher	
1982	Madame's Place	Herself	Episode: "Candidates for Hollywood"
1984	He's Not Your Son	Kathy Saunders	
1985	Alice in Wonderland	The Rose	
1986	Intimate Encounters	Julie Atkins	
1988	Outback Bound	Samantha 'Sam' Hollings	
1989	The Lady Forgets	Rebecca Simms/Julie Black	
1990	The World's Oldest Living Bridesmaid	Brenda Morgan	Executive producer
1991	Runaway Father	Pat Bennett	Executive producer
1991	False Arrest	Joyce Lukezic	Based on true story (the murders of William Redmond and Helen Phelps)
1992	In My Daughter's Name	Laura Elias	Executive producer
1992	The President's Child	Elizabeth Hemming	
1993	Remember	Nicky Wells	
1994	My Name Is Kate	Kate	Executive producer
1994	Dream On	Ashlyn	Episode: "Martin Tupper in 'Magnum Farce'"
1995	Dangerous Intentions	Beth Williamson	
1995	An Element of Truth	Vanessa Graves	
1995	High Society	Jacquelyn Seymour Winters/Lucinda	Episode: "We Ought to Be in Pictures"
1996	The Stepford Husbands	Jodi Davison	
1996–1997	Melrose Place	Sherry Doucette	4 episodes
1997	Knots Landing: Back to the Cul-de-Sac	Abby Fairgate Cunningham Ewing Sumner	TV miniseries
1998	Moonlight Becomes You	Maggie Holloway	
2000	Rude Awakening	Linda	Episode: "Star 80 Proof"
2004	A Very Cool Christmas	Mrs. Claus	
2006	Jane Doe: Yes, I Remember It Well	Polly Jameson	
2007	Cold Case	Lauren Williams	Episode: "Blackout"
2007	Love Is a Four Letter Word	Margot Harper	
2008	Ladies of the House	Elizabeth	
2009	Dirty Sexy Money	Cameo appearance	Episode: "The Facts"
2008–2010	Nip/Tuck	Lulu Grandiron	Episodes: "Lulu Grandiron" and "Christian Troy II"
2012	GCB	Bitsy Lourd	Episode: "A Wolf in Sheep's Clothing"
2014–2015, 2018	General Hospital	Madeline Reeves	Special guest star
2014	Deadly Revenge	Evelyn	
2014	When Life Keeps Getting In The Way	Dr. Goldstein	
2015	12 Gifts of Christmas	Joyce Rehnquist	
2015	Joy	Priscilla	
2016	Sharknado: The 4th Awakens	Supervisor Wink	
2017	Hilton Head Island	Victoria Trisk	Series regular, 22 episodes
2018	Best Mom	Nana	
2019	Turnover	Pat	
2019	Carol of the Bells	Helen Harris	
2019	Christmas Wishes and Mistletoe Kisses	Caroline Sinclair	
2019	A Beauty & The Beast Christmas	Bijou	
2022	Nope	Bonnie Clayton	
2023	The Rookie: Feds	Layla Laughlin	Episode: "Out for Blood"
2023	V.C. Andrews' Dawn	Lillian Cutler	
2023	Secrets of the Morning	Lillian Cutler	
2023	Twilight's Child	Lillian Cutler	
2023	Origin	Mrs. Copeland	
2023	Ladies of the '80s: A Divas Christmas	Dana Cunningham	
2024	NCIS	Wanda Prescott	Episode: "The Trouble With Hal"
2024	The Soul Trader	Erica	
2025	Doctor Odyssey	Olivia Grace	Episode: "Sophisticated Ladies Week"
TBA	Abused †	Dr. Karen Carden	Post-Production

== Awards and nominations ==
Year	Award	Category	Work	Result
1986	Soap Opera Digest Award	Outstanding Actress in a Leading Role on a Prime Time Serial	Knots Landing	Nominated
1986	Soap Opera Digest Award	Outstanding Villainess: Prime Time	Knots Landing	Won
1988	Soap Opera Digest Award	Outstanding Villainess: Prime Time	Knots Landing	Won
1989	Soap Opera Digest Award	Outstanding Villainess: Prime Time	Knots Landing	Won
2007	TV Land Awards	Anniversary Award	Knots Landing	Won
2015	Daytime Emmy Award	Outstanding Special Guest Performer in a Drama Series	General Hospital	Won
2018	Hollywood Reel Independent Film Festival	Best Supporting Actress	Best Mom	Won
2022	Palm Springs International Film Festival	Women in Film and Television's Above and Beyond Award		Honored
