= Raging Sharks =

- DVD cover
- Directed by: Danny Lerner
- Written by: Les Weldon
- Produced by: Danny Lerner; David Varod; Les Weldon
- Starring: Corin Nemec; Vanessa Angel; Corbin Bernsen; Todd Jensen; Elise Muller; Blinky van Bilderbeek; Simone Levin; Emil Markov; Jonas Talkington; Atanas Srebrev
- Cinematography: Emil Topuzov
- Edited by: Michele Gisser
- Music by: Stephen Edwards; Tom Erba
- Production companies: Nu Image Films; Tosca Pictures
- Distributed by: Nu Image Films
- Release date: February 11, 2005
- Running time: 94 minutes
- Countries: United States; Bulgaria
- Language: English

Raging Sharks is a 2005 direct-to-video science fiction action horror film directed by Danny Lerner. It stars Corin Nemec (From Stargate SG-1), Vanessa Angel, Corbin Bernsen, Todd Jensen, Elise Muller, Blinky van Bilderbeek, Simone Levin, Emil Markov, Jonas Talkington, and Atanas Srebrev. Set in an isolated underwater research facility, the film follows a group of scientists as they discover a strange series of crystals, only to find out that it also harbors a psychological effect on sharks, causing them to become more aggressive. The sharks soon attack the facility, causing the oxygen supply to start to decrease, and forcing the survivors to find a way out.

== Plot ==
In outer space, two alien spaceships collide, one of which releases a capsule that lands at the bottom of the Bermuda Triangle. Five years later, the underwater research facility, the Oshona, discovers the crystals, and the facility's manager Mike Olsen retrieves them. As Mike leaves for the mainland, divers Don and Jake attempt to make repairs outside of the facility, but they are soon attacked by sharks. One of the scientists and Mike's wife, Linda, attempt to rescue them, only to be chased by more sharks, which inadvertently cause the facility to lose power, cutting the facility's oxygen supply, which begins to decrease, and Linda, scientist Jonas, technicians Vera, Simona, and Carlo, and workers Harvey and Leo are trapped in the facility.

Mike receives word of the incident, and boards the submarine USS Roosevelt, piloted by captain Riley. Meanwhile, a boat above the Oshona, the Paradiso, sends a diver down to inspect the damage, he's killed by the sharks during the dive. They then attempt to send two men down in a seaplane to retrieve the cables, one of the sharks rams the plane, causing one of the men to fall overboard, and be eaten by the shark. In the Oshona, Jonas discovers that the sharks' aggressive behavior is being caused by the crystals, which have been eaten by the sharks, creating a psychological effect on the sharks' minds. Harvey becomes increasingly paranoid. The sharks, in the meantime, kill several people at a nearby beach before sinking a nearby boat.

Mike and agent Ben Stiles are transferred into the Oshona, and intend to evacuate the survivors into the submarine, an electrical overload created by the crystals occurs, creating a fire in the engine room, preventing the evacuation. With the oxygen supply dwindling, Mike and Carlo are sent in a submersible to turn on the facility's oxygen reserves. They are successful, Carlo is killed when the sharks attack the submersible. Mike is forced to hide in a nearby crevice, where he finds the capsule, and retrieves another sample of the crystal before managing to return to the Oshona. Harvey finally snaps, and attempts to escape in another submersible, the sharks attack it, and cause it to sink into a crevice, creating an explosion that kills Harvey.

Minutes later, Mike and Linda discover Jonas to be stabbed to death, and as they return to the control center, Stiles appears and causes a shootout that kills Vera. Stiles reveals himself as a Black Ops agent who has been sent to retrieve the crystals. Leo attempts to create a diversion that distracts Stiles, is killed himself. Mike and Linda run away while Stiles take Simona as a hostage. He soon decides she's useless and traps her inside a flooding room, where she drowns. Stiles stealthily chases Mike and Linda throughout the flooding facility, he is finally subdued after engaging in a fight with Mike. He then attempts to escape the facility, only to be eaten by a shark. Mike and Linda witness two aliens diving down, and retrieving the capsule before the Oshona completely collapses. Linda nearly drowns, Mike rescues her, and they are picked up by Riley in the submarine, where Linda is revived. In the aftermath, Mike fails to convince Riley of his sighting of the aliens.

== Cast ==
- Corin Nemec as Dr. Mike Olsen
- Vanessa Angel as Linda Olsen
- Corbin Bernsen as Captain Riley
- Todd Jensen as Ben Stiles
- Binky van Bilderbeek as Harvey
- Elise Muller as Vera
- Simone Levin as Simona
- Jonas Talkington as Jonas
- Atanas Srebrev as Carlo
- Emil Markov as Leo

== Reception ==
A Horror.Net review said that the film is a good use of live stock footage, computer effects, and fake shark heads and gallons of blood. Alison Nastasi, of Horror Squad, said that the film has several hilariously bad moments that B movie shark fanatics will enjoy.
