= Attack of the Sabretooth =

- Written by: Tom Woosley
- Directed by: George Miller
- Starring: Robert Carradine; Nicholas Bell; Brian Wimmer
- Music by: Tim Jones
- Country of origin: United States
- Original language: English

Production
- Producer: Tom Parkinson
- Cinematography: Mark Melville
- Editor: Cindy Clarkson
- Running time: 90 minutes

Original release
- Network: Sci Fi Channel
- Release: July 14, 2005

Attack of The Sabretooth is a 2005 made for television science-fiction-horror film directed by George Miller. A billionaire turns an island into an adventure park with genetically engineered saber-toothed tigers. They escape from containment and start killing people. It premiered as a Sci Fi Pictures TV-movie on the Sci Fi Channel on July 14, 2005. It was a sequel of Sabretooth.

== Cast ==
- Robert Carradine as Grant
- Nicholas Bell as Niles
- Brian Wimmer as Brian
- Stacy Haiduk as Savannah
- Rawiri Paratene as Sachariah
- Susanne Sutchy as Autumn
- Cleopatra Coleman as Alys
- Amanda Stephens as Alaina
- Natalie Avital as Collette
- Billy Aaron Brown as Kirk
- Parry Shen as Robbie

== Reception ==
Dread Central gives it 2 out of 5 and says "Too say that Attack of the Sabretooth is a stupid movie would be quite the understatement. The film contains enough cheese to put someone lactose intolerant into a coma." They later comment "Repulsively dumb characters, insipid dialogue, surprisingly gory death scenes, not so surprisingly terrible special effects, but at least it moves at a reasonably brisk pace and has a few mildly entertaining moments"

M. J. Simpson gives it a rating of D− and writes "Attack of the Sabretooth is absolute bollocks. It is so bad, in such fascinating ways, that it actually becomes entertaining, as such things are often said to do but so rarely in fact, actually, you know, do. It really looks like the people who made this either didn’t know what they were doing, or didn’t care, or both."

Barry Atkinson in the book Indie Horrors! The Not-To-Be-Missed, The Acceptable, and The Forgettable gives it 3 stars and says "Granted, the acting is ham-fisted at times, the dialogue crass ("People could get eaten!"), but all in all, this isn't bad a monster-on-the-loose/gore-fest. It's far better, in fact, than IFG's Sabretooth. The giant furry cats look realistic (particularly the misshapen one), and visually, the brightly photographed lush tropical locations are a sight to behold."

Andrew Smith from Popcorn Pictures awarded the film a score of 4/10, writing, "Attack of the Sabretooth isn’t overly terrible given the rehashed material, the slap-dash writing, the budget and the fact it was a Sci-Fi Channel production (which is a kiss-of-death nowadays). I just hope someone remembered to pay royalties to Michael Crichton."
