= Allison Hirschlag =

American actress

- Born: July 8, 1984 (age 41); New York City, New York, United States
- Occupation: Television actress
- Years active: 2003-2011
- Parent: Julia Barr

Allison Hirschlag is an American actress, the daughter of long-time actress Julia Barr of All My Children. Hirschlag was the third actress to play Lizzie Spaulding on Guiding Light, from 2002 to 2003.

Hirschlag attended Dwight-Englewood School in Englewood, New Jersey.
