= Ladies of the House =

2008 American television film

- Written by: Karen Struck
- Directed by: James A. Contner
- Starring: Florence Henderson; Donna Mills; Pam Grier
- Theme music composer: Alex Wilkinson
- Country of origin: United States
- Original language: English

Production
- Producers: Robert Halmi, Jr. Larry Levinson; Michael Moran
- Cinematography: Brian Shanley
- Editor: Colleen Halsey
- Running time: 120 minutes
- Production companies: Faith & Family Entertainment

Original release
- Network: Hallmark Channel
- Release: October 18, 2008

Ladies of the House is a television movie made-for-TV movie that aired on Hallmark Channel in October 2008. It stars Florence Henderson, Donna Mills, and Pam Grier.

== Plot ==
A house owned by a church, to be sold to fund the day care center, is in need of major remodeling. The pastor enlists three women to take on the project: Birdie (Pam Grier), Rose (Florence Henderson), and Elizabeth (Donna Mills). Initially they want to hire someone to do it all, but as their budget is limited, they realize they must to do it themselves. As they remodel the decrepit house, Elizabeth discovers her marriage is over, Birdie deals with her husband's retirement, and Rose copes with the news that her husband (Lance Henriksen), has been diagnosed with cancer. They also make unlikely friendships with men at the local hardware store, and their intimidating neighbor, Junior.

== Cast ==
- Florence Henderson as Rose Olmstead
- Donna Mills as Elizabeth Waldman
- Pam Grier as Roberta "Birdie" Marchand
- Lance Henriksen as Frank Olmstead
- Gordon Thomson as Richard Waldman
- Michael Ensign as Pastor Wesley
- Richard Roundtree as Stan Marchand
- Lobo Sebastian as Junior

== Reception ==
Ladies of the House did fairly well for Hallmark Channel: it received a 1.9 household rating and delivered over 1.6 million homes and 2.9 million total viewers on the day of its premiere, ranking it as the second-highest-rated ad-supported cable movie of the week and boosting the network to rank sixth in Prime Time for the day. The movie also doubled their October-to-date Prime Time rating among women between the ages of 25-54.
