= The Hunted Lady =

The Hunted Lady is a 1977 American TV movie starring Donna Mills as a woman who goes on the run. It was a pilot for a TV series that never eventuated but screened as a stand-alone film.

== Credits ==
- A Quinn Martin Production
- Executive Producer: Quinn Martin
- Producer: William Robert Yates
- Director: Richard Lang
- Written by William Robert Yates
- Director of Photography: Paul Lohmann
- Running Time: 99 minutes

== Plot ==
When two detectives uncover the truth about a United States senator's closed ties to the criminal underworld, one ends up dead, and the other - Susan Reilly - is framed for his murder. Strong evidence and a weak alibi combine to turn all sides solidly against her, including her fellow officers and superiors in the Los Angeles Police Department. Unable to prove her innocence, Susan escapes, in search of the answers that can clear her name before the police catch her, but more than her freedom is threatened. When the mob finds out that the sharp-eyed young female detective is on the loose, they send out an assassin with very specific orders: find her, then silence her.

== Cast ==
- Donna Mills as Susan Reilly
- Lawrence Casey as Robert Armstrong
- Robert Reed as Dr. Arthur Sills
- Andrew Duggan as Captain Shannon
- Alan Feinstein as Sergeant Arizzio
- Geoffrey Lewis as Mr. Eckert
- Michael McGuire as Lieutenant Jacks
- Jenny O'Hara as Carol Arizzio
- Quinn Redeker as Max Devine
- Jess Walton as Helen Weiss

== Production ==
The success of Charlie's Angels in the 1976-77 ratings season prompted all the American TV networks to feature more sexy young women in action-orientated roles, either adding them to existing programs or introducing new shows that focused on them. NBC picked up The Bionic Woman from ABC and also added young female characters to the 1977–78 seasons of Baa Baa Black Sheep and BJ and the Bear. They introduced several new shows with female sex symbol leads such as Quark, The Roller Girls and Who's Watching the Kids?, as well as commissioning pilots for several series which were direct imitations of Charlie's Angels: The Secret War of Jackie's Girls, The Hunted Lady and Cover Girls.

== Reception ==
It was the 28th highest-rated show of the week.

== Notes ==
- Hilmes, Mary (2007). NBC: America's Network. University of California Press. ISBN 9780520250819.
