= Vanessa Angel (English actress) =

English actor and former model (born 1966)

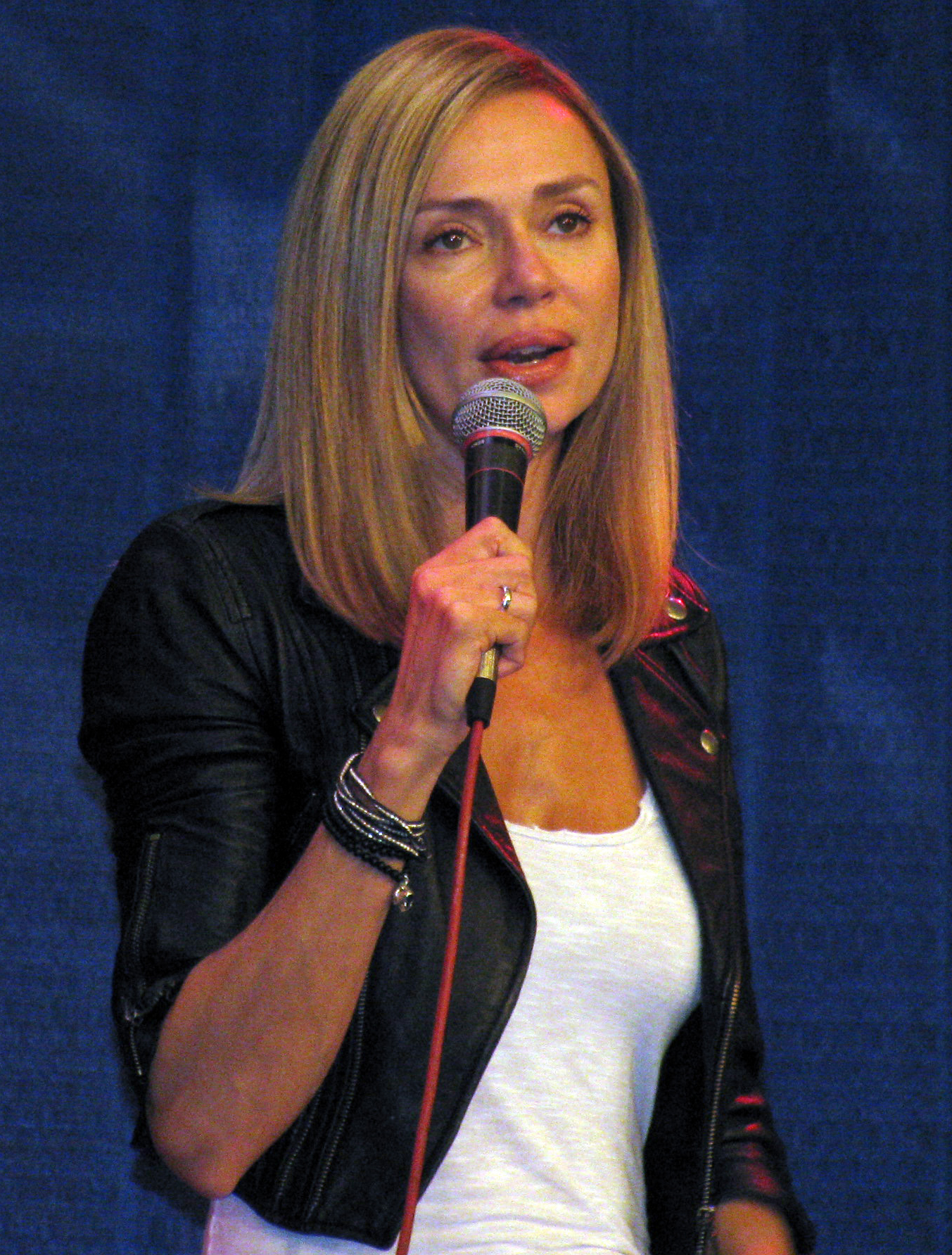
- Angel in 2009
- Born: Vanessa Madeline Angel; 10 November 1966 (age 59); London, England
- Occupations: Actress; model
- Years active: 1985–present
- Known for: Weird Science; Kingpin
- Spouse: Rick Otto (m. 1996; div. 2019)

Vanessa Madeline Angel (born 10 November 1966) is an English actress and former model. She is noted for roles in the television series Weird Science and Stargate SG-1, and for co-starring in the film Kingpin.

== Early life ==
Angel, who has said this is her birth name and not a stage name, was born 10 November 1966 in London, the daughter of Elizabeth and Peter Angel, a stockbroker. She was discovered by a model-management agent in a London cafe as a teenager. At 16, she was signed by Ford Models and moved to New York City. During her modelling stint, Angel appeared on the covers of Vogue and Cosmopolitan. She was also contracted as the Diet Pepsi Girl.

== Career ==
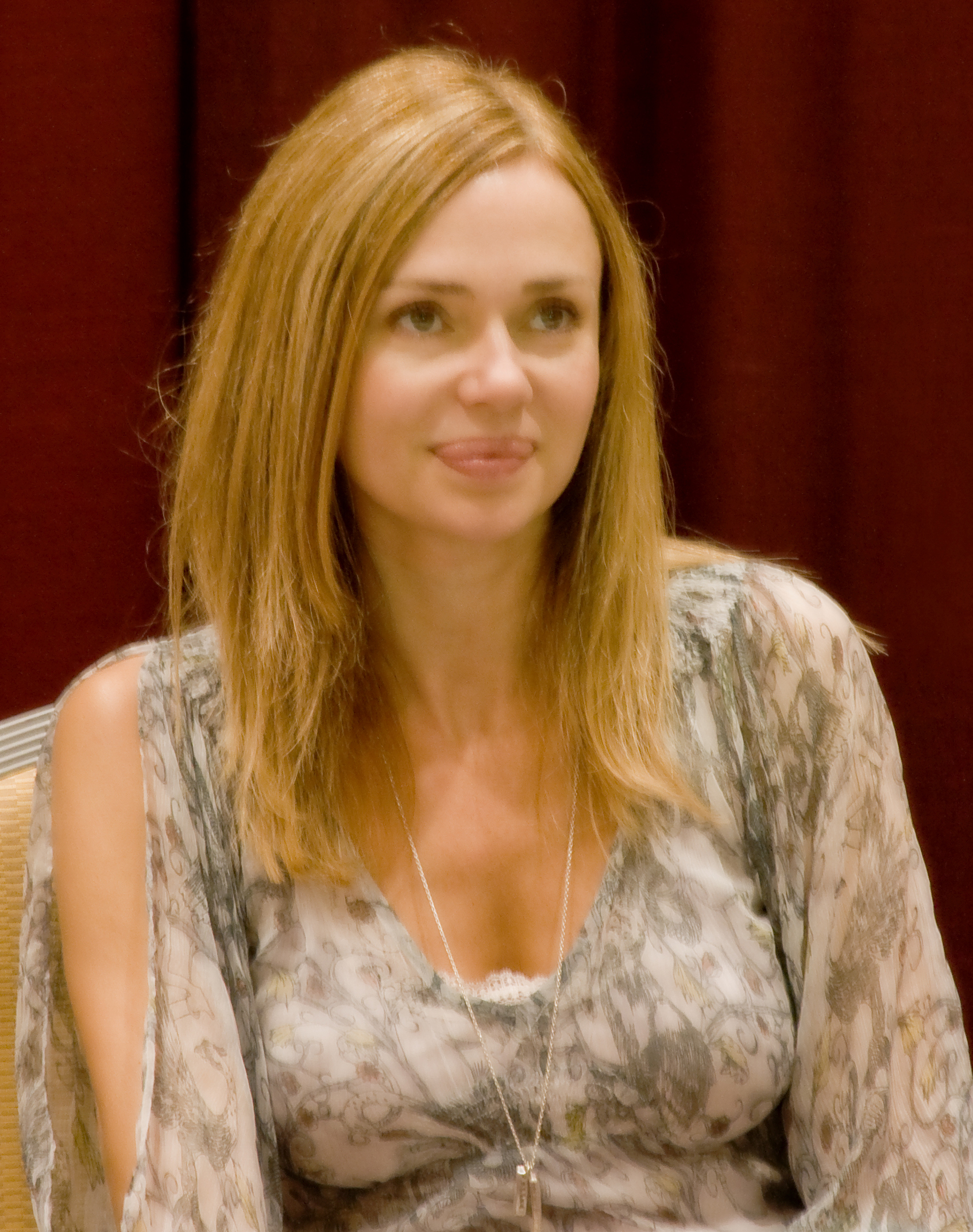
Angel at the 2007 Dragon Con in downtown Atlanta, Georgia

Angel's first film role was in the 1985 American comedy Spies Like Us, in which she played a soldier in the Soviet Strategic Missile Forces who sleeps with Dan Aykroyd's character. She also appeared in the accompanying music video for the film's theme song, written and performed by Paul McCartney. In 1990, she appeared in a small role in the film King of New York. Angel continued to appear in films throughout the early 1990s. After a leading guest spot on TV's The Equalizer, she played the recurring roles of Megan on Baywatch and Detective Peggy Elliott on Reasonable Doubts. She guest-starred in two episodes of Melrose Place, playing what she described as "this crazy, drugged-out, bisexual supermodel who kissed [the character played by] Daphne Zuniga!"

From 1994 to 1998, she starred in the television series Weird Science as Lisa, the computer-generated genie role originated by Kelly LeBrock in the 1985 film upon which the series is based. In 1995, Angel was cast in the role of Xena, a guest spot on Hercules: The Legendary Journeys, but due to an illness was unable to take the role, which eventually went to Lucy Lawless.

During the series run of Weird Science, Angel landed the female lead in the Farrelly brothers film Kingpin. Critic Roger Ebert of The Chicago Sun-Times singled out Angel for praise in Kingpin, writing that while her role initially seems to be mere "decoration", she eventually "proves herself as a comic actress able to hold her own" with her co-stars. Angel played roles in Kissing a Fool with David Schwimmer, followed by a role in the 1999 film Made Men. In 2004, she appeared in SuperBabies: Baby Geniuses 2, as Scott Baio's wife. Angel has also had roles in the Sci-Fi Pictures Original telefilm Sabretooth (2002) and The Perfect Score (2004).

In 2000, she guest-starred in three episodes of the Sci-Fi Channel's Stargate SG-1, playing Anise, a Tok'ra archaeologist/scientist whose host is named Freya. Her first appearance is in the season-four episode "Upgrades", and she appeared in the two following episodes, "Crossroads" and "Divide and Conquer". In 2005, Angel played herself in the second-season episode of Entourage entitled "I Love You Too". In 2007, she completed the independent film Blind Ambition, and later appeared in the Farrellys' Hall Pass. She played a guest role as Alison in the fifth season of Californication.

Angel started a clothing line in 2009, VANE LA.

On 15 October 2014, Angel appeared on Ken Reid's podcast TV Guidance Counselor.

== Filmography ==
=== Film ===
Year	Title	Role	Notes
1985	Spies Like Us	Soviet Rocket Crewperson	
1989	Another Chance	Jackie Johanson	
1990	King of New York	'British Female' bodyguard of Frank White	
1991	Killer Instinct	Deborah Walker	
1993	The Cover Girl Murders	Rachel	
1994	Sleep with Me	Marianne	
1994	Cityscrapes: Los Angeles	Trouble	
1996	Kingpin	Claudia	
1998	Kissing a Fool	Natasha	
1999	Made Men	Debra	
2000	Enemies of Laughter	Jennifer	
2000	G-Men from Hell	Gloria Lake	
2001	Camouflage	Cindy Davies	
2001	Firetrap	Beth Hooper	
2002	Sabretooth	Catherine Viciy	
2004	The Perfect Score	Anita Donlee	
2004	Out for Blood	Susan Hastings	Video
2004	Superbabies: Baby Geniuses 2	Jean Bobbins	
2005	Raging Sharks	Linda Olsen	Video
2005	The Good Humor Man	Ms. Barlass	
2005	Popstar	Diane	
2006	Monster Night	Claire Ackerman	Video
2008	Blind Ambition	Autumn milestone	
2009	Endless Bummer	Brenda	
2011	Hall Pass	Missy Frankinopoulos	
2011	Cougar Hunting	Ursula	
2013	Hansel & Gretel: Warriors of Witchcraft	Ms. Keegan	
2013	National Lampoon Presents: Surf Party	Brenda	
2015	Lockhart	Lilith	
2015	Lycan	Prof. Anderson	
2015	Trouble Sleeping	Vanessa	video
2018	Behind the Walls	Kathy Harper	
2023	Johnny & Clyde	Susan	
2025	The Roaring Game	Katrina Cole	
TBA	Desert Fiends 2	Elizabeth	

=== Television and web ===
Year	Title	Role	Notes
1988	The Equalizer	Christine Hayes	Episode: "Video Games"
1991	Baywatch	Megan	3 Episodes: "The One That Got Away", "The Trophy: Parts 1 & 2"
1992	On the Air	Chorus Girl	Episode: "The Lester Guy Show"
1992	Raven	Flight Attendant	Episode: "The Unseen Enemy"
1992	Lady Boss	Christie	TV miniseries
1992–1993	Reasonable Doubts	Det. Peggy Elliott	Recurring role
1993	Melrose Place	Karen	2 Episodes: "Carpe Diem", "State of Need"
1993	Murder, She Wrote	Kathryn Scofield	Episode: "The Phantom Killer"
1993	The Cover Girl Murders	Rachel	TV movie
1994	Time Trax	Jane Hawkins	Episode: "The Gravity of It All"
1994–1998	Weird Science	Lisa	Main role
1997	Veronica's Closet	Suzanne	2 Episodes: "Veronica's Best Buddy", "Veronica's a Doll"
2000	Partners	Angel	TV movie
2000	Stargate SG-1	Anise / Freya	3 Episodes: "Upgrades", "Crossroads", "Divide and Conquer"
2002	Sabretooth	Catherine Viciy	TV movie
2003	The Division	Mary Turner	Episode: "Body Double"
2004	Puppet Master vs Demonic Toys	Erica Sharpe	TV movie
2005	Criminal Intent	Susan Grace	TV movie
2005	Entourage	Herself	Episode: "I Love You Too"
2007	Planet Raptor	Dr. Anna Rogers	TV movie
2009	Saving Grace	Pauline Hoover	Episode: "The Heart of a Cop"
2011	Christmas Spirit	Hope	TV movie
2012	Californication	Alison	Episode: "The Way of the Fist"
2014	Hello Ladies: The Movie	McCadams	TV movie
2016	My Summer Prince	Queen Rosalind	TV movie
2019	Crown Lake	Dr. Lewis	Web series
2023	Sins of the Preacher's Wife	Marion	TV movie
