= Michael Toshiyuki Uno =

American director and actor

Michael Toshiyuki Uno is an American film and television director, as well as an actor. He is credited with directing television programs such as Alfred Hitchcock Presents (the remake series that began in 1985), China Beach, The Outsiders, Early Edition, and Dawson's Creek.

== Career ==
Directing

Uno has also directed the films The Silence (1982), The Wash (1988), and Dangerous Intentions (1995).

He was nominated with Joseph Benson for an Academy Award for Best Live Action Short Film in 1982 for The Silence.

Acting

In 2016, Michael Uno played in the science-fiction movie Paradox.

In January 2008, he played a Kung-Fu master in a William Shatner Priceline commercial.
