= The Garden (2006 film) =

- Film poster
- Directed by: Don Michael Paul
- Written by: Sam Bozzo
- Produced by: Havilah Production
- Starring: Lance Henriksen; Brian Wimmer
- Release dates: 17 March 2006 (Belgium); 11 July 2006 (United States)
- Running time: 92 minutes
- Country: United States
- Language: English

The Garden is an American drama-horror film from 2006. It was directed by Don Michael Paul, written by Sam Bozzo, starring Lance Henriksen and Brian Wimmer. The film was produced under the working title River to Havilah.

== Cast ==
- Lance Henriksen – Ben Zachary
- Brian Wimmer – David
- Adam Taylor Gordon – Sam
- Claudia Christian – Dr. Cairns
- Sean Young – Miss Grace Chapman
- Victoria Justice – Holly
- Erik Walker – Jesse
- Ariana Richmond – Trashy Girl #1
- Jennifer Lutheran – Trashy Girl #2
- Rick Barker – Faceless Person
