= Justin Time (film) =

- Release date: March 9, 2010
- Country: United States
- Language: English

Justin Time is a 2010 American direct-to-DVD teen action and fantasy film. It was released on DVD in March 2010.

== Plot ==
An ancient and magical amulet which has the power to stop time is passed through generations. Justin, a half-Shoshone kid, tries to prevent an evil mogul from taking control of the object with his imaginary friend, Olive.

== Cast ==
- Chris Laird as Justin
- Merida Schnak as Olive
- Brian Wimmer as Uncle Heath
- Danny Trejo as Mardok
- Shareece Pfeiffer as Angelic Romano
- Michael Flynn as Michael Romano
- Alyx Gaudio as Harvey
- Troy Hinckley as Samuel
- Mike Hildebrant as Rudy
- Alex Egbert as Fletcher
- Dave Martinez as Ben
- Matthew Reese as Mr. Black
- J. Omar Hansen as Omar
- Bronzell Miller as "Ace"
- Cyloie Neal as "Bug"
- Nano De Silva as Nanju

== Reception ==
The film was reviewed by several Christian film review organizations. The Dove Foundation gave it a 12+ seal, noting that the violence was "tame compared to today's standards" and finding it "cute and entertaining". Common Sense Media was less positive, describing it as having "poor production and an erratic script". It was also briefly covered by Bill Raker and David B. King in the Louisville Eccentric Observer, where it was called "wildly entertaining".
