= Superdome (film) =

1978 American made-for-television film

- Genre: Crime; Drama; Sport
- Teleplay by: Barry Oringer
- Story by: Bill Svanoe
- Directed by: Jerry Jameson
- Starring: David Janssen; Edie Adams; Ken Howard; Clifton Davis
- Music by: John Cacavas
- Country of origin: United States
- Original language: English

Production
- Producer: William Frye
- Production location: Mercedes-Benz Superdome in New Orleans
- Cinematography: Matthew F. Leonetti
- Editor: J. Terry Williams
- Running time: 97 minutes
- Production company: ABC Circle Films

Original release
- Network: ABC
- Release: January 9, 1978

Superdome is a 1978 American made-for-television drama film produced by ABC Circle Films. It premiered on ABC as part of The ABC Monday Night Movie series and was used to promote Super Bowl XII. Featuring a cast of stars, it was directed by Jerry Jameson and written by Barry Oringer from a story by Oringer and Bill Svanoe.

== Plot ==
At the Louisiana Superdome in New Orleans, the star players on the Cougars are dealing with issues beyond football. Dave Walecki is having marital difficulties, while quarterback Jim McCauley is being pursued by a shady management firm. Meanwhile, a national gambling syndicate attempts to find a way to stop the heavily favored Cougars from winning the game. All these plots are connected by the murder of several people associated with the team.

== Cast ==
- David Janssen as Mike Shelley
- Edie Adams as Joyce
- Clifton Davis as P. K. Jackson
- Peter Haskell as Doug Collins
- Ken Howard as Dave Walecki
- Susan Howard as Nancy Walecki
- Van Johnson as Chip Green
- Donna Mills as Lainie Wiley
- Jane Wyatt as Fay Bonelli
- Tom Selleck as Jim McCauley
- Michael Pataki as Tony Sicota
- Robin Mattson as Gail Green
- M. Emmet Walsh as Whitley
- Vonetta McGee as Sonny
- Bubba Smith as Moses Gordine
- Ed Nelson as George Beldridge
- Dick Butkus as Scott Hennerson
- Les Josephson as Nick Caretta

== Mystery Science Theater 3000 ==
The film was later featured on Mystery Science Theater 3000 in 1989 during the KTMA season (episode #15).

== Home video releases ==
The film was released on VHS under the names The Super Bowl Story and Countdown to the Super Bowl. It was also released on DVD in a set called Sam Elliott/Tom Selleck Collection with Blue River, Gone to Texas, and I Will Fight No More Forever. On March 3, 2020, Superdome was released on Blu-ray by Kino Lorber, featuring a new commentary track by director Jerry Jameson and critics Howard S. Berger and Steve Mitchel.

== See also ==
- List of American football films
- List of television films produced for American Broadcasting Company
