= Bring It On: All or Nothing =

2006 film by Steve Rash

- DVD cover
- Directed by: Steve Rash
- Written by: Alyson Fouse
- Produced by: David Roessell
- Starring: Hayden Panettiere; Solange Knowles-Smith; Rihanna
- Cinematography: Victor J. Kemper
- Edited by: Danny Saphire
- Music by: Transcenders
- Production company: Beacon Pictures
- Distributed by: Universal Studios Home Entertainment
- Release date: August 8, 2006
- Running time: 99 minutes
- Country: United States
- Language: English

Bring It On: All or Nothing is a 2006 American teen comedy film directed by Steve Rash, written by Alyson Fouse, and starring Hayden Panettiere, Solange Knowles-Smith, Gus Carr, Marcy Rylan, and Jake McDorman. Rihanna appears as herself in her film debut. It is the third installment in the Bring It On film series and the second sequel to Bring It On (2000).

Produced under the working title Bring It On Yet Again, the film was released direct-to-DVD in the United States by Universal Studios Home Entertainment on August 8, 2006.

== Plot ==
Britney Allen is the new captain of her high-school cheerleading squad, the Pacific Vista Pirates. She is the girlfriend of Brad Warner, the star quarterback at Pacific Vista High School, and one of the richest girls in school. When her father loses his job, she and her family are forced to move to Crenshaw Heights; a working-class area. Britney, being the "white girl”, suffers culture shock as she adjusts to her new life. She finds herself at odds with her new classmates such as cheerleaders Camille, the captain, Kireesha and Leti, who assume she is an idiotic "Barbie".

She meets another cheerleader, Jesse, who is more welcoming. After a pep rally, Jesse suggests Britney try out for the cheerleading squad, the Crenshaw Heights Warriors. Britney declines because she promised her old squad she would never cheer again. However, Britney later tries out for the cheerleading squad. Impressed by her athletic abilities, Kireesha and Leti encourage Camille to let Britney join the squad. Britney rejects the offer at first, but later joins after her mother encourages her. Britney learns that her new team is training for a cheerleading competition where the winning squad gets new computers for their school. In Pacific Vista, Winnie, Britney's replacement as cheerleading captain, holds practice on the football field. Winnie flirts with Brad and simultaneously frustrates the squad, including Amber, Britney's best friend.

The next day at practice, Britney notices the boys krumping and suggests to Camille that they add it to their routine but is rebuffed. Jesse delivers pizza to Britney's house, unaware she lives there. Brad answers the door and insults Jesse. Winnie notices Britney as a new cheerleader for Crenshaw Heights during a news report. The following night at a football game, Winnie, Amber, and fellow cheerleader Sierra confront Britney about breaking her promise. After seeing Pacific Vista on television, Camille decides to have Britney and Jesse teach the squad krumping. Jesse and Britney grow closer, and Jesse kisses Britney at Tar Beach. Britney calls Amber and tells her about the kiss, who reminds her about the homecoming dance at her old school and confides that Winnie has been spending time with Brad.

The next morning, Britney makes an excuse that her dog died to get out of the game the same night as the homecoming dance. Jesse and Camille arrive at Britney's house to offer their condolences, but discover her lie. Jesse leaves upset, and Camille kicks Britney out of the squad. Britney and Brad arrive at the homecoming dance and she makes amends with her friends, except Winnie who makes disparaging racial remarks about Britney's new friends. Brad and Winnie are crowned homecoming King and Queen, and Winnie confesses to sleeping with Brad. Britney ends her friendship with Winnie and breaks up with Brad. The next morning, Britney apologizes to Camille and the rest of the squad for not attending the game. Camille welcomes Britney back to the team after Britney defends them against Winnie's racially insensitive remarks.

At the cheerleading competition, which is hosted by musical artist Rihanna, Brianna, a cheerleader for Pacific Vista, faints from a rigorous diet she has been on. Britney apologizes to her for making her lose weight when she was their captain. Britney makes amends with Jesse, then kisses him. Rihanna announces that the Pacific Vista Pirates and Crenshaw Heights Warriors are the finalists. Winnie changes the moves at the last minute, incorporating high-risk stunts. The Warriors scare off the Pirates with their krumping and proceed with their routine. Winnie complains to Rihanna about Crenshaw Heights, and once again makes a stereotypical remark against the squad. Winnie is voted out as captain, and Crenshaw Heights is declared the winner of the competition. Amber is named the new captain of the Pirates, and Britney officially introduces both squads to each other. Later, the Crenshaw Heights make an appearance in Rihanna's music video for "Pon de Replay".

== Cast ==
- Hayden Panettiere as Britney Allen
- Solange Knowles-Smith as Camille
- Gus Carr as Jesse
- Marcy Rylan as Winnie Harper
- Cindy Chiu as Amber Garcia
- Giovonnie Samuels as Kirresha
- Francia Almendárez as Letícia "Leti"
- Gary Leroi Gray as Tyson
- Danielle Savre as Brianna
- Jessica Fife as Sierra
- Jake McDorman as Brad Warner
- Kiersten Warren as Pamela Allen
- Eric Bruskotter as Timothy Allen
- Rihanna as herself
- Swin Cash as herself
- Kaliyah Warren as herself

== Production ==
=== Casting ===
Hayden Panettiere and Solange Knowles-Smith were cast as Britney Allen and Camille, the captains of the film's rival cheerleading squads. Francia Raisa, who had previously worked as a backup dancer, was 17 when she booked the role of Leti; she later described All or Nothing as her first film.

During production, Rihanna joined the cast for a cameo as herself and a musical performance. Universal subsequently promoted the part as her film debut. Panettiere later recalled that she and Rihanna were 16 and 17, respectively, when they met on the set.

=== Filming ===
Principal photography was underway in Los Angeles by November 2005, when the film was still titled Bring It On Yet Again. Members of the Long Beach City College cheer program appeared in the film.

The cast underwent cheerleading and dance training for the production. Tony G choreographed the routines, while Lil' C and Richmond demonstrated the physical vocabulary used for the street-dance sequences.

== Release ==
On August 2, 2006, Universal Studios Home Entertainment held a special hometown screening at the AMC MJ Northline Mall in Houston, six days before the film's home-video release. Knowles-Smith attended with her sister Beyoncé and singer Kelly Rowland.

The film was released DVD in the United States on August 8, 2006. The disc included a gag reel and four production featurettes covering the filming, cast training, choreography, and street-dance sequences. The film generated $19.7 million in domestic DVD sales. Universal subsequently released the film on Blu-ray in the United States on July 10, 2018. The disc retained the special features included with the original DVD release.

== Music ==
The film's original music was composed by Transcenders. Universal Studios Home Entertainment emphasized the soundtrack in its promotional campaign, advertising the film as featuring contemporary pop music by Rihanna, Solange, Gwen Stefani, Avril Lavigne, and Weezer.

The film concludes with members of the cast performing in a video for Rihanna's debut single, “Pon de Replay”. In a 2025 retrospective, Joey Guerra of the Houston Chronicle identified the music as characteristic of mid-2000s pop, highlighting the presence of an emerging Rihanna, Solange, and Stefani's early solo material. Guerra also noted that Stefani's songs are used as transitional music throughout the film.

== Reception ==
On the review aggregator website Rotten Tomatoes, 20% of five critics' reviews are positive. Heather Boerner of Common Sense Media described the film as entertaining despite its derivative and predictable plot, praising its music and casting while criticizing its reliance on teen-film clichés and its depiction of the appropriation of hip-hop culture. Kirsten Howard of Den of Geek criticized the film's treatment of race and its use of stereotypes, although she acknowledged that it remained enjoyable to watch.

Retrospective coverage has documented an enduring fan response to the film, although writers have disagreed on whether it qualifies as a cult film. In a 2015 retrospective for Complex, LaToya Ferguson ranked it second in the series behind the original film and identified it as the installment that began shifting the franchise from cheerleading films toward the conventions of dance films. In 2023, Hanifah Rahman of BuzzFeed included it among teen films she believed had been undervalued by critics, describing it as “iconic” despite its low critical rating.

Reflecting on the film nearly twenty years after its release, Panettiere recalled that fans frequently approached her with an unusually intense reaction to her role and said that their continued enthusiasm was satisfying to her as a performer. Joey Guerra of the Houston Chronicle argued that the film was not quite a cult classic, but said its camp reputation had endured, particularly through the scene in which Panettiere's character attempts to krump, which he described as having become iconic and continuing to circulate widely on social media. Guerra also noted the film's place in popular culture as Solange's final acting role and as an early screen appearance by Rihanna.
