= Kiss of a Killer =

- Genre: Drama; Thriller
- Written by: David Warfield
- Directed by: Larry Elikann
- Starring: Annette O'Toole; Eva Marie Saint; Brian Wimmer
- Music by: J.A.C. Redford
- Country of origin: United States
- Original language: English

Production
- Executive producers: Andrew Adelson; John Conboy
- Producer: George W. Perkins
- Cinematography: Denis Lewiston
- Editor: Peter V. White
- Running time: 93 minutes
- Production companies: ABC Productions

Original release
- Network: ABC
- Release: February 1, 1993

Kiss of a Killer is a 1993 American made-for-television thriller-drama film written by David Warfield and directed by Larry Elikann. It stars Annette O'Toole, Eva Marie Saint and Brian Wimmer. The film debuted on February 1, 1993 on ABC.

== Plot ==
Kate Wilson (Annette O'Toole), leads a double life by spending her days working in a real estate office and her nights caring for her ailing, manipulative mother (Eva Marie Saint). Once a week she tells her mother that she is staying with her friend Reba, when she is actually driving across town to stay at the Red Oak Inn, a local hotel resort which is her "escape". One of her encounters at the Red Oak Inn brings her into close contact with a serial rapist who has just stepped up to homicide.

== Cast ==
- Annette O'Toole as Kate Wilson
- Eva Marie Saint as Mrs. Wilson
- Brian Wimmer as Gary Grafton
- Vic Polizos as Detective James
- Gregg Henry as Richard
- Lee Garlington as Helaine
- Gordon Clapp as Sullivan
- Amy Stock-Poynton as Young Mrs. Wilson
