= Queens of Drama (TV series) =

- Genre: Soap opera; Reality television
- Starring: Lindsay Hartley; Crystal Hunt; Vanessa Marcil; Chrystee Pharris; Hunter Tylo; Donna Mills
- Country of origin: United States
- Original language: English
- No. of seasons: 1
- No. of episodes: 10

Production
- Executive producers: Leslie Greif: Aaron Fishman; Adam Freeman; Adam Reed; Tim Laurie
- Production company: Thinkfactory Media

Original release
- Network: Pop
- Release: April 26 – June 10, 2015

Queens of Drama is an American scripted reality drama television series. The series follows former daytime and primetime soap stars who form a production company to develop and produce of a new serialized drama pilot for television. It stars Lindsay Hartley, Crystal Hunt, Vanessa Marcil, Chrystee Pharris, and Hunter Tylo, along with Donna Mills as a fictionalized version of herself. Mills stars as a no-nonsense queen bee of the group. The series debuted on Pop on April 26, 2015. Ten episodes reached air.

== Cast ==
- Lindsay Hartley
- Crystal Hunt
- Vanessa Marcil
- Chrystee Pharris
- Hunter Tylo
- Donna Mills

Joan Collins also guest starred on the series.

== Episodes ==
No.	Title	Original release date	U.S. viewers (thousands)
1	"I Don’t Do Ugly"	April 26, 2015	169
Vanessa Marcil, Lindsay Hartley and Crystal Hunt approach Donna Mills to create a new TV drama series; the women come to realize they do not share the same vision for the show.
2	"Art Imitating Life"	April 26, 2015	169
Donna invites the women over to tell them the CW is interested in their project, but the women chafe that she spoke to the network without them; Crystal makes judgmental comments.
3	"Those Little Devils"	April 29, 2015	N/A
Donna and her friend, Joan Collins, teach the women a lesson when Crystal goes behind Donna's back; the women receive invitations to the Sue Wong fashion show; Crystal steals the spotlight.
4	"Dealing with a Sociopath"	May 6, 2015	N/A
Joan Collins scolds the women for trying to replace Donna Mills as producer; Donna wonders if Crystal should be kicked out of the group after learning of her criminal record; Vanessa and Chrystee plan their pitch for the showrunner.
5	"What Donna Wants"	May 13, 2015	N/A
The women pitch their ideas to the new showrunner, Lee Fleming; Donna discovers Vanessa doesn't want to act in the show; Hunter tries to change Vanessa's mind about acting while on a retreat in Palm Springs, California.
6	"Clean Up Her Mess"	May 20, 2015	N/A
Donna takes on another role after learning Vanessa quit; Hunter shares Donna's secrets with Vanessa; Lindsay discovers her boyfriend may have to relocate.
7	"Asking for Trouble"	May 27, 2015	N/A
Donna's pal, Lorenzo Lamas, comes to the casting session to audition; Lindsay seeks a role for her boyfriend; Hunter discovers a harsh comment re-tweeted by Lindsay.
8	"She Set Me Up"	June 3, 2015	N/A
Discord erupts when the women film monologues for the sizzle reel; Crystal has doubts about Donna's loyalty; Hunter gets injured.
9	"Read the Script!"	June 10, 2015	N/A
Hunter is unable to continue after her injury, but the others move forward with production; Chrystee and Donna battle over a new scene.
10	"How Did We Get Here"	June 10, 2015	N/A
Lindsay, Crystal and Chrystee discover Donna is pitching the show to the network without them and crash her meeting.
