= Late for Dinner =

1991 film by W. D. Richter

- Theatrical release poster
- Directed by: W. D. Richter
- Written by: Mark Andrus
- Produced by: Gary Daigler; Dan Lupovitz; W. D. Richter
- Starring: Brian Wimmer; Peter Berg; Marcia Gay Harden; Peter Gallagher
- Cinematography: Peter Sova
- Edited by: Richard Chew; Robert Leighton
- Music by: David Mansfield
- Production companies: Castle Rock Entertainment; New Line Cinema
- Distributed by: Columbia Pictures
- Release date: September 20, 1991
- Running time: 99 minutes
- Country: United States
- Language: English
- Budget: $14 million
- Box office: $8,906,823

Late for Dinner is a 1991 American science fiction drama film directed by W. D. Richter, starring Peter Berg, Brian Wimmer, and Marcia Gay Harden. The supporting cast includes Peter Gallagher and Richard Steinmetz, with Janeane Garofalo making her film debut in a brief, comical role as a cashier at a burger joint.

== Plot ==
In 1962, brothers-in-law Willie Husband and Frank Lovegren find themselves on the run after a deadly confrontation. Willie, in self-defense, kills a man, but Bob Freeman, a witness, frames them for kidnapping and murder, placing both men in a difficult situation.

Willie lives with his wife, Joy, and their daughter, Jess, in Santa Fe, New Mexico. Frank, Joy's simple-minded brother, also lives with them. The family is struggling financially after Willie lost his job at a local milk company, falling behind on mortgage payments. When they learn the bank is about to foreclose, Willie confronts the banker, Bob Freeman, with a receipt showing he has caught up on payments with borrowed funds. Instead of helping, Freeman burns the receipt and pressures Willie to sell the house for far less than it is worth. Willie refuses and storms out.

On the drive home, Willie discovers that Frank has "borrowed" Freeman's son, Donald, because he believes the boy is being mistreated. Frank asks Willie to keep Donald, but when they arrive home, Joy convinces Willie to accept Freeman's offer to sell the house. Willie reluctantly agrees and calls Freeman to make the deal, mentioning that Donald ended up in their car.

Sensing an opportunity, Freeman accuses Willie of kidnapping and arranges a meeting in the desert under the pretense of retrieving his son. Freeman's real plan is to frame Willie and Frank for a ransom exchange. At the meeting, Freeman and his henchman draw guns, revealing their intention to use Donald's testimony to accuse Willie of kidnapping. A fight breaks out, and Willie is shot in the shoulder. He manages to shoot Freeman's henchman in self-defense, but knowing they won't be believed, Willie and Frank flee, leaving Donald behind.

The two attempt to return home, but the police have already surrounded the house. From a distance, Jess gestures for them not to approach. Realizing they cannot return, they drive off into the desert.

After hours of fleeing, they encounter Dr. Dan Chilblains, an eccentric doctor in Pomona, California. Willie passes out from his injuries, and Chilblains treats him. He also diagnoses Frank with a serious kidney condition, glomerulonephritis, which will eventually be fatal. Chilblains convinces Frank to undergo an experimental cryogenic procedure that will freeze them both until Frank can be cured. Frank agrees, believing it is a temporary solution and a way to hide from the police. Willie, still unconscious, is frozen without knowing what is happening.

Nearly thirty years later, in 1991, a freak accident causes the cryogenic facility to be destroyed. Willie and Frank are revived after their tanks burst open. Confused and disoriented, they wake up in a completely changed world, unaware they have been frozen for nearly three decades.

As they try to navigate the modern world, they experience culture shock. Technology has advanced, prices are higher, and life is completely different. After visiting a hospital, they finally realize they've been asleep for twenty nine years.

Determined to find Joy and Jess, they return to Santa Fe. They discover that Jess, now an adult, is living on her own. She reveals that Joy remarried, believing Willie was gone forever, but she has since divorced. Joy managed to keep their house by exposing Freeman's fraudulent activities, which eventually led to his downfall. However, Freeman was later murdered.

Willie and Jess go to Joy's house to reunite with her. At first, Joy struggles to accept Willie's return, as he has not aged while she has grown older. She feels the passage of time has changed too much between them. However, Willie reminds her of their love, and slowly, she begins to warm to him again.

In the end, Willie and Joy rebuild their relationship. Joy donates a kidney to save Frank's life, and the family starts a new chapter together, finding happiness despite the years that have passed.

== Cast ==
- Peter Berg as Frank Lovegren
- Brian Wimmer as Willie Husband
- Marcia Gay Harden as Joy Husband
- Colleen Flynn as Adult Jessica Husband
  - Cassy Friel as Little Jessica Husband
- Peter Gallagher as Bob Freeman
- Richard Steinmetz as Adult Donald Freeman
  - Ross Malinger as Little Donald Freeman
- Luce Rains as Duane Gardener (billed as Steven Schwartz-Hartley)
- John Prosky as Officer Tom Bostich
- Bo Brundin as Dr. Dan Chilblains
- Donald Hotton as Dr. Chris Underwood
- Kyle Secor as Leland Shakes
- Pat Finn-Lee as Susan
- Billy Vera as the Male Radio D.J. (voice)
- Jeremy Roberts as the Truck Driver
- Janeane Garofalo as the Counter Girl

== Production ==
During a conversation which veered toward the subject of cryonics, W. D. Richter was inspired to develop a project involving a man from the past who awakens in the 1990s. Richter enlisted Mark Andrus to write the screenplay under the working title of Freezer with the project eventually acquired by Castle Rock Entertainment. The film initially started in 1957, but producer Dan Lupovitz stated it was decided to move the date up to 1962 as it more adequately reflected the starting point of a more cynical attitude of American history.

== Release ==
=== Critical reception ===
On the review aggregator website Rotten Tomatoes, 58% of the 12 critics' reviews are positive.

=== Box office ===
The film was released on September 20, 1991, and grossed $8.9 million.

=== Home media ===
The film was first released on VHS on April 29, 1992, by New Line Home Video and SVS/Triumph. It was re-released on VHS on June 23, 1998, by MGM Home Entertainment under the Movie Time label.

The film made its DVD debut on December 31, 2009. It was subsequently re-released on DVD on January 15, 2011, by Willette Acquisition Corp.

On April 14, 2015, the film was released on Blu-ray by Kino Lorber.
