= The World's Oldest Living Bridesmaid =

- Written by: Janet Kovalcik
- Directed by: Joseph L. Scanlan
- Starring: Donna Mills; Brian Wimmer; Winston Rekert; Art Hindle; Beverly Garland
- Country of origin: United States
- Original language: English

Production
- Executive producer: Donna Mills
- Producer: Christopher Morgan
- Cinematography: Craig Denault
- Editor: Michael A. Hoey
- Running time: 97 minutes
- Production companies: Donna Mills Productions; Hearst Entertainment Productions

Original release
- Network: CBS
- Release: September 21, 1990

The World's Oldest Living Bridesmaid is an American romantic comedy film written by Janet Kovalcik and directed by Joseph L. Scanlan. The film stars Donna Mills as Brenda Morgan, a single woman and lawyer who gets romantically involved with her younger secretary (played by Brian Wimmer). The film premiered on September 21, 1990, on CBS.

== Cast ==
- Donna Mills as Brenda Morgan
- Brian Wimmer as Alex Dante
- Winston Rekert as Brian
- Art Hindle as Roger
- Beverly Garland as Brenda's Mother
