= Turnover (film) =

- Directed by: Linda Palmer
- Written by: Linda Palmer & Laree' Griffith
- Produced by: Mark Cardone; Rae Davis; Marvin Glover; Linda Palmer
- Starring: Paul Guilfoyle; Julia Silverman; Riker Lynch; Adwin Brown; Isabella Blake-Thomas; Blair Williamson; Jamie Brewer; Carlos Carrasco; Donna Mills; Beverly Todd
- Cinematography: Jennifer Hook
- Edited by: Scott Simerly Jr.
- Production companies: Runaway Productions; Sea Sand Entertainment
- Distributed by: Indie Rights
- Release date: March 8, 2019
- Running time: 123 minutes
- Country: United States
- Language: English

Turnover is a 2019 American independent comedy-drama film written and directed by Linda Palmer and starring Paul Guilfoyle as a cafe owner who leaves his disgruntled manager (played by Riker Lynch) in charge of the business. The film was premiered at the 2019 Idyllwild International Festival of Cinema and later was released by Indie Rights.

Turnover received positive reviews from critics. On review aggregator website Rotten Tomatoes, the film has an approval rating of 100% based on 14 reviews. It received Best Feature Award at the Idyllwild International Festival of Cinema, Best Comedic Feature at the Manhattan Film Festival and more than 20 other awards and nominations at the independent festivals.

== Cast ==
- Paul Guilfoyle as Peter
- Julia Silverman as Gladys
- Riker Lynch as Henry
- Adwin Brown as William
- Isabella Blake-Thomas as Pepper
- Blair Williamson as Charlie
- Jamie Brewer as Gina
- Carlos Carrasco as Miguel
- Donna Mills as Pat
- Beverly Todd as Ruth
- Ellen Gerstein as Cherub
- Elina Madison as Charlotte
- Kat Kramer as Fran
