= Haunts of the Very Rich =

- Genre: Drama; Horror; Mystery; Thriller
- Written by: T.K. Brown III; William P. Wood
- Directed by: Paul Wendkos
- Starring: Lloyd Bridges; Cloris Leachman; Edward Asner; Anne Francis; Tony Bill; Donna Mills; Robert Reed; Moses Gunn
- Music by: Dominic Frontiere
- Country of origin: United States
- Original language: English

Production
- Producer: Lillian Gallo
- Production locations: Miami; Villa Vizcaya - 3251 S. Miami Avenue, Miami, Florida
- Cinematography: Ben Colman
- Editor: Fredric Steinkamp
- Running time: 74 minutes
- Production company: ABC Circle Films

Original release
- Network: ABC
- Release: September 20, 1972

Haunts of the Very Rich is a 1972 made-for-TV horror thriller film, broadcast as an ABC Movie of the Week.

== Plot ==
A group of rich tourists and business people fly to a mysterious tropical resort, the Portals of Eden, hosted by Seacrist. There, they spend their time relaxing and being pampered in paradise. Following a powerful storm after their first night, the guests suddenly find themselves all alone, with dwindling food and water, without communication with the outside world, and abandoned by the resort staff. The guests discover they have each recently experienced a brush with death, and they try to determine what it means. Dave had had a heart attack. Ellen a fatal reaction to a rabies vaccine. Annette was given unfamiliar sleeping pills by her husband. Lyle and Laurie had been in a car accident. Reverend Fellows had drowned. Al reluctantly realizes he may have fallen down some stairs while drunk. Conditions continue to deteriorate and some come to believe that they are in Hell. As time passes, they receive clues about their fate. First, a seaplane lands to answer their distress call and the pilot assures them he will send help, although he cannot take any of them to safety. The group is elated but Laurie is depressed because she recognizes the pilot as Johnny Delmonico, a singer who had been recently reported in the news as having died in a plane crash. A second seaplane arrives later and the pilot explains that the storm was a hurricane and he had been held up with urgent relief efforts. The guests happily pack their bags to leave but return to find the plane gone, although there had been no engine noise. They realize that in this Hell, they are repeatedly given hope then have it taken away. Dave finds his own hopes of life with Ellen dashed when his clingy wife appears, apparently having committed suicide because she couldn't bear to be without him.

== Cast ==
- Lloyd Bridges as Dave Woodrough
- Cloris Leachman as Ellen Blunt
- Edward Asner as Al Hunsicker
- Anne Francis as Annette Larrier
- Tony Bill as Lyle Dugan
- Donna Mills as Laurie Dugan
- Robert Reed as Rev. John Fellows
- Moses Gunn as Seacrist
- Beverly Gill as Miss Vick
- Todd Martin as Harris
- Michael Lembeck as Johnny Delmonico

== Production notes ==
Haunts of the Very Rich was filmed around the Miami, Florida area, with the resort scenes filmed at Villa Vizcaya.

== See also ==
- List of American films of 1972
