= Brian Wimmer =

American actor (born 1959)

- Born: October 1, 1959 (age 66); Orem, Utah, U.S.
- Occupations: Actor, fly fisherman
- Years active: 1982–2015
- Spouse(s): Liza Utter (1996-?) (divorced); Susanne Sutchy (?-2013) (divorced)

Brian Wimmer (born October 1, 1959) is an American actor. He is perhaps best known for his role as Cpl. Boonie Lanier in the TV series China Beach, which ran from 1988 until 1991. He also regularly appeared on Flipper (1995-1996) and had roles in TV shows such as ER (1996) and The Fugitive (2001). He participated in the last Battle of the Network Stars (1988). He starred in the films Late for Dinner (1991), The Maddening (1995) and Beneath Loch Ness (2001).

== Early life ==
Brian Wimmer was born on October 1, 1959, in Orem, Utah, to Larry, an economics professor at Brigham Young University, and Louise Wimmer. He was raised in Provo, Utah. During high school, Wimmer began working as a ranch hand at Robert Redford's Sundance Resort, where he was ultimately employed for ten years. He originally expected a career in the ski industry.

== Career ==
In 1990, he played Alex in the television movie The World's Oldest Living Bridesmaid. In 1991, he played Willie Husband in the film Late for Dinner. In 1993, he played a rapist in the television film Kiss of a Killer.

Wimmer has been the owner and operator of Fly Fishing Provo River, guiding and running fly fishing operations since 2004. In 2016, he helped to create the Sundance Fly Fishing program and Fly Shop at Sundance Mountain Resort, where he continues to operate. He has been fly fishing all over the world as a VIP guest angler and host to Fly Fishing America and Fly Fishing the World on ESPN.

== Personal life ==
On December 31, 1996, Wimmer married Liza Utter. As of June 15, 2000, they had separated. He was later married to Susanne Sutchy, but they divorced in 2013.

== Filmography ==
Film
Year	Title	Role	Notes
1984	Footloose	Dancer	Uncredited
1985	A Nightmare on Elm Street 2: Freddy's Revenge	Do-Gooder	
1987	Less than Zero	Trent Burroughs	
1989	Under the Boardwalk	Cage	
1991	Late for Dinner	Willie Husband	
1993	Blue Flame	Flemming	
1994	Floundering	Hunk	
1995	Tank Girl	Richard	
1995	The Maddening	David Osborne	
1995	Dead Badge	Dan Sampson	
1999	Children of the Struggle	John Glass	
2000	Jericho	Dead Miner	
2001	Beneath Loch Ness	Case	
2003	Reeseville	Jason Buchanan	
2006	The Garden	David	
2006	Outlaw Trail: The Treasure of Butch Cassidy	Butch Cassidy	
2006	Vengeance	Nick	
2007	House of Fears	Mark	
2007	Moola	Robert Lawson	
2007	Tears of a King	Sam Phillips	
2009	The Yankles	Charlie Jones	
2010	Justin Time	Uncle Heath	
2012	Shades of Treason	Frank Lindh	
2013	Haunt	Alan Asher	
2019	Ski Bum: The Warren Miller Story	Himself	Documentary

Television
Year	Title	Role	Notes
1986	Divorce Court	Guy Layton	Episode: "Layton vs. Layton"
1987	Days of Our Lives	Dean	
1987	Billionaire Boys Club	Cop	Television film
1988–1991	China Beach	Cpl. Boonie Lanier	Main cast (62 episodes)
1989	What Price Victory	Denzil Ray	Television film
1990	Dangerous Pursuit	Frank	Television film
1990	The World's Oldest Living Bridesmaid	Alex Dante	Television film
1992	Honor Thy Mother	Det. Murphy	Television film
1993	Kiss of a Killer	Gary Grafton	Television film
1993	Tales from the Crypt	Kevin	Episode: "Half Way Horrible"
1995–1996	Flipper	Dr. Keith Ricks	Main cast (22 episodes)
1996	ER	Mickey	Episode: "Last Call"
1997	Jitters	Evan Moore	Television film
1998	One Hot Summer Night	Richard Linsky	Television film
1998	Michael Hayes	Officer James Ramsey	Episode: "Under Color of Law"
1998	Final Justice	Mark Sherman	Television film
2000	Strange World	Daniel Ashworth	Episode: "Food"
2001	The Fugitive	Tucker Frederickson	Episode: "Tucker’s Gift"
2004	Going to the Mat	Tom Newfield	Television film
2004	Heart of the Storm	Wayne Broadbeck	Television film
2005	Thicker than Water	Sam Nelson	Television film
2005	Attack of the Sabretooth	Brian	Television film
