= Lizzie Spaulding =

- Guiding Light character
- Emme Rylan as Lizzie Spaulding
- Portrayed by: Julie Levine (1990–1991); Hayden Panettiere (1996–2000); MacKenzie Mauzy (2000–2002); Allison Hirschlag (2002–2003); Crystal Hunt (2003–2006); Emme Rylan (2006–2009)
- Duration: 1990–1991, 1996–2009
- First appearance: November 28, 1990
- Last appearance: September 18, 2009
- Created by: Pam Long
- Introduced by: Robert Calhoun (1990); Paul Rauch (1996)
In-universe information
- Other names: Elizabeth Lillian Spaulding; Lizzie Randall; Lizzie Lewis
- Occupation: Businesswoman; Socialite
- Father: Phillip Spaulding
- Mother: Beth Raines
- Brothers: James Spaulding
- Half-brothers: Zach Spaulding
- Half-sisters: Emma Spaulding; Peyton Spaulding
- Spouse: Jonathan Randall (2006–2007); Bill Lewis (2009–present)
- Children: Sarah Randall; Unnamed son
- Grandfathers: Justin Marler; Alan Spaulding (adoptive); Bradley Raines (step)
- Grandmothers: Jackie Scott; Lillian Raines; Elizabeth Granville (adoptive)
- Uncles: Gus Aitoro (adoptive); Alan-Michael Spaulding (adoptive)
- Aunts: Samantha Marler; Peyton Raines (adoptive)
- First cousins: Rafe Rivera (adoptive)

Lizzie Spaulding is a fictional character from the CBS soap opera Guiding Light. The role was last portrayed by actress Emme Rylan from February 7, 2006 to September 18, 2009.

She is the daughter of Phillip Spaulding and Beth Raines, born onscreen on Thanksgiving in 1990. Her birth year was later revised to 1986 when she turned 18 in 2004. She is the third Elizabeth in her family; her paternal grandmother and mother's first names are Elizabeth as well. For Lizzie's battle with leukemia in 2000, the show received a Special Recognition Award from the Leukemia and Lymphoma Society for bringing national awareness of the disease to the attention of daytime viewers.

== Casting ==
The role of Lizzie as an infant was played by Julie Levine from 1990 to 1991. The role was assumed on December 5, 1996, by Hayden Panettiere, who initially appeared for only a few episodes. However, Panettiere returned regularly the following year, from November 1, 1997. For Lizzie's battle with leukemia in 2000, the soap received a Special Recognition Award from the Leukemia and Lymphoma Society for bringing national awareness of the disease to the attention of daytime viewers. In 2000, Panettiere vacated the role, with her last airdate on October 13, 2000. It was recast with MacKenzie Mauzy, who aired from November 21, 2000 to July 16, 2002. Mauzy then was replaced by Allison Hirschlag, who portrayed the role from August 12, 2002 to January 28, 2003 when the character was rapidly aged. Hirschlag’s stint was brief when she was replaced and the role was assumed by Crystal Hunt on February 25, 2003. Hunt received a Daytime Emmy Award nomination for Outstanding Younger Actress in a Drama Series, as well as a Soap Opera Digest Award nomination for her portrayal. Hunt departed on January 31, 2006, and the role was last portrayed by Emme Rylan from February 7, 2006 to the soap's series finale on September 18, 2009.

== Family ==
Lizzie has had a difficult family life. As a member of the wealthy Spaulding family, she has gone through a chaotic childhood and adolescence. Though her family wields great influence in Springfield, they have enemies which is justified given her father, uncle and grandfather's misdeeds. Lizzie has also involved herself in a great amount of trouble in her young life leading her to have periods of mental disturbance like her father.

The first-born child of Phillip Spaulding and Beth Raines, Lizzie has a younger brother, James Lemay Spaulding. She also has two younger paternal half-siblings, Alan Cooper "Zach" Spaulding and Emma Spencer-Spaulding. Lizzie also has a sister/Aunt born to Beth and Alan named Peyton Alexandra Raines. A comment by Alan stated that Beth named the child "after that quarterback," a reference to NFL quarterback Peyton Manning. Lizzie has had numerous stepparents in her life. Her stepfather, Jim Lemay, was killed in a fire during Christmas when she was a child after saving her and James' lives. Lizzie was also once close to her former stepmother, Harley Cooper Aitoro (now her aunt), and her former stepsister, Daisy Lemay. She has a daughter, Sarah, with Jonathan, and is currently married to Bill Lewis. The show's finale showed Lizzie asking Sarah to touch her belly, as Lizzie was shown pregnant with Bill's son.

== Storylines ==
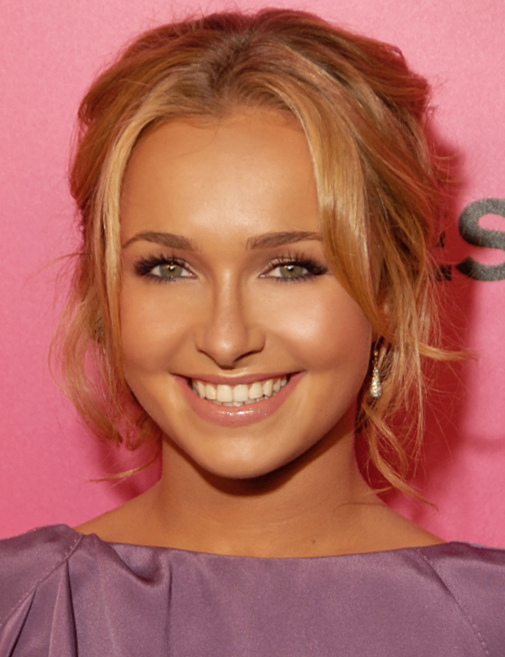
Hayden Panettiere, who portrayed Lizzie from 1996 to 2000

Lizzie (Hayden Panettiere) accidentally kills Carl Stevens in early 1998 when she sees him threatening her mother, Beth, with a gun. The gun fell, and Lizzie picked it up and fatally shot Carl. She suffered nightmares and hallucinations and finally had a breakdown upon being questioned by her father after being stopped from fleeing the country with her mother, who was determined to keep Lizzie's involvement in Carl's death a secret. She was sent to camp for therapy and returned somewhat better adjusted.

In 1999, she was kidnapped by the Nursery Rhyme Stalker and was saved by Alan's old lover, Annie Dutton (also an escaped convict at the time). She befriended her rescuer and ran away with her when Lizzie overheard her father speaking of getting rid of Annie and took it literally. Though she was reassured by the latter that Phillip wasn't planning to kill her, the woman guessed that he was making plans to send her back to prison and made plans to run away. Lizzie begged Annie to take her along, as she felt neglected by her mother, and she agreed. Lizzie was later saved by her grandfather and his then wife, India von Halkein. Upon her return to Springfield, Phillip and Beth vowed to their daughter that they would never make her feel unwanted again when she told her mother that she thought Beth wouldn't miss her if she was gone. Lizzie was devastated, though, when she learned that Annie was gone.

2000 wasn't an easy year for Lizzie either when she was diagnosed with leukemia after being in a car accident with her stepsister, Daisy Lemay. Though Daisy had witnessed signs of sickness in Lizzie before the accident, the latter swore her to secrecy as she wanted to witness her mother marrying Daisy's father, Jim Lemay. Lizzie finally went into remission when she underwent a successful bone marrow transplant thanks to her new baby brother, James. Alan later revealed to her that the baby was Phillip's and not Jim's. When she heard her mother and stepfather making plans to leave Springfield, Lizzie (MacKenzie Mauzy) feigned sickness again but her godfather, Rick Bauer called her out and she confessed. Tragedy struck again later in the year when Jim died in a fire after saving Lizzie and James a few days before Christmas.

In 2003, after dealing with issues involving her grandfather's faked heart attack and helping Marina Cooper frame her uncle Gus Aitoro, Lizzie (Allison Hirschlag) pleaded with Beth and Phillip to let her go away to boarding school and they reluctantly agreed. She soon develops a crush on Shayne Lewis.

Distraught over her family's mistrust, Lizzie confided in Alan that she was only trying to be a good Spaulding by manipulating events to get what she wanted. She also finally admitted to Christopher that she needed help and she wanted to get back to being that happy girl she used to be.

Later, Lizzie admitted to Phillip that, despite how she had thought she'd feel, she loved Emma.

Lizzie developed a crush on Joey Lupo who was in a relationship with Tammy. She succeeded in breaking them up, and admitted to Joey that she loved him.

After overhearing a conversation between Buzz and Coop, Lizzie learned that Coop had been accepted to study at Oxford. She is heartbroken at the prospect of losing him, Lizzie made a secret phone call, fully determined to move ahead with the wedding. She then asked Coop to meet her since she’d planned a trip for them to Cancun. Coop was thrilled, unaware that Lizzie planned to bring him to the altar instead. Although Alex uncovered Lizzie’s plot, she ultimately gave Lizzie her blessing when Lizzie made it clear she was doing it all for love. To her chagrin, Coop didn’t show up at the airport on time, leading Lizzie to think he’d backed out. Finally, an injured Coop did arrive. Learning that Coop had a strange accident while he was working on his car (tires fell on him and he knocked over a gas pipe), Lizzie was sure that Beth and Alan were to blame for trying to keep Coop away from her. Later, Coop found out Lizzie was planning a wedding and confronted her. Lizzie apologized but reminded Coop he kept a secret from her too about his offer at Oxford. Coop apologized and they both resolve to trust each other more. Coop then decided to remain in Springfield rather than go to Oxford. Later, Lizzie received word that Alan was at the hospital and confronted him about sending someone after Coop. Realizing she needed to play hard ball, Lizzie had Beth’s plane rerouted so that she’d miss the Spaulding board meeting in which a new CEO was being elected. Without Beth to intervene a surprising new CEO was elected—Harley! Meanwhile, unable to answer to a boss, Lizzie quit her new job at the television station, but Coop stood up for her when Beth tried to stir up trouble between them. Later, a grateful Lizzie promised she’d find a way to solve their cash-flow problem.

The money, however, came with a price: Lizzie. Though she loved Coop, Lizzie was desperate for the money and began a secret affair with Quinn.

After her breakup with Coop, Lizzie found comfort in a drunken one-night stand with Jonathan Randall, who had also been ousted by his lover Tammy Winslow. Weeks later, Lizzie would find herself pregnant with Jonathan's child. Unsure if it belonged to him or Coop, Lizzie decided to make sure everyone believed the child to be Coop's, and schemed to cover up her night with Jonathan.

Jonathan pieced the truth together, and at first did nothing. However, he refused to let Lizzie marry Coop, and announced at her wedding that the child was his. A scared Lizzie convinced Coop that Jonathan had raped her, and she had been too embarrassed to tell anyone. Coop believed her at first, but when everyone saw Jonathan's sweet, concerned, and uncharacteristic treatment over a weak Lizzie, her story was proved false.

Now alone, Lizzie formed a bond with Jonathan and his girlfriend Tammy. The three decided to get through the pregnancy as a team, and not let her grandfather Alan control her baby. The three got along fine, but secretly Lizzie was beginning to fall in love with her baby's father. She began to act on it in little ways, but convinced herself a relationship with him was not possible, due to his immense feelings for Tammy. Things went well, until Alan rigged a trial to have Lizzie sent to Ravenwood for being mentally incompetent. In a rash decision, Jonathan proposed to Lizzie while she was on the witness stand, in a show of good faith to the judge that the two of them would make a loving home for their child.

The two married with Tammy’s blessing (as the marriage was intended to be just for show). Lizzie's feelings for Jon were re-ignited, and she schemed to be with him, making the logical claim that if Jonathan and Tammy were in fact 'meant to be' then she wouldn't be able to split them up. He continued to see Tammy though, to the point where he missed an important baby appointment, and returned home to find Lizzie passed out and bleeding. She was diagnosed with pre-eclampsia, and a guilty Jonathan ended his relationship with Tammy in order to try to be there for his wife and child for real.

Tammy was present for the baby's birth though, as Jonathan delivered his and Lizzie's daughter in a car, on the side of a snowy road. The pair named her Sarah, in memory of Reva’s mother.

Wanting to be real family with her daughter and husband, Lizzie tried her best to be the ideal wife. She was crushed to find Jonathan still cheating with Tammy though, even after their daughter’s birth. Lizzie schemed to keep her marriage afloat, and even faked post-partum depression to make Jonathan pay her attention, and stay with her. He went back to Tammy though, and a distraught Lizzie sought help from Father Ray. She left Sarah in the car while she went into the church (still trying to keep up her depression hoax) The car was stolen with Sarah inside, and Lizzie was blamed. Jon railed against her, and planned to take his daughter from her, to avoid the damage he thought she could do.

In a lapse of judgment, Lizzie begged her granddad to help her keep her the daughter she loved. This proved the wrong move though, and in an attempt to kill Jonathan, Tammy was instead killed. Jonathan faked his and Sarah’s death in a staged car crash, and didn't let Lizzie in on the secret. She was left to think her daughter was dead, and that it was all her fault.

After losing the thing that meant most to her in her daughter Sarah, being alienated by her mother, ostracized by her grandfather, and being duped (unknowingly) by Reva, Lizzie had hit rock bottom.

In an act of self-declaration and rebellion, she bought a bar. In this bar, looking for any sort of human affection, Lizzie shamelessly flirted with Jake, a rough looking bar fly (who bore similar style to her ex-husband Jonathan). She almost let things get too far with him, but Billy Lewis stepped in, and though she didn’t want to be saved, he saved her from herself. Thus began an awkward, yet moving friendship.

The two helped each other a lot, and became very close. Lizzie kept his secret about being off the wagon again, and Billy offered her a high-level job at Lewis Construction, putting faith in her and taking her under his wing like her grandfather would not.

Lizzie made friends with an ex-Dinah Marler, who would go on to become her roommate. Reva Shayne had a close relationship with Lizzie, without knowing about her prior connection to the abduction of Dinah Marler.

Thinking it’s what Billy needs in his life, and wanting to do good for him, Lizzie tracked down his son, Bill Lewis, and with Dinah’s help brought him back to town. In doing so, she gained a new roommate, as Bill had no immediate lodgings upon his return.

At first wary of his strange treatment of Billy, Lizzie was won over by Bill’s charm and sweet words, and the way he defended her to her grandfather. Unbeknownst to Lizzie, Bill was scheming to get her in bed in order to gain access to her information on an upcoming Lewis project, in order to slight his father. He succeeded, and stole the deal from her, making it impossible for his father not to re-hire him.

Feeling betrayed and scorned, but still attracted to the man Bill had presented himself to be, Lizzie continued to interact with Bill, despite his several attempts to get his father to oust her from the business, and his life. She tried for a while to exact revenge, and even broke into his hotel room to find information on him. Their relationship would begin to go back and forth between moments of closeness, and antagonistic moments.

It became obvious that Lizzie was starting to develop deeper feelings for the Lewis heir. She was warned against this by everyone close to her, even his own father (and her confidant) Billy. Lizzie continued to be there for Bill though, and even bent over backwards trying to help him when he lost his eyesight in an explosion. Bill spurned her help though, and a crushed Lizzie turned to Reva for a shoulder to cry on. Lizzie began having severe stomach cramps, so Reva took her to Cedars, where the doctor speculated that Lizzie could be pregnant. Over zealous at the notion, Lizzie took this speculation as truth, and prepared herself to be a mother again. Bill was less than excited when she told him, but Lizzie let him know that he was not going to ruin this for her. She saw it as a second chance, a gleam of hope, and he could be in the child’s life or not. He expressed doubt about wanting to be with her and the child, and Lizzie stormed out. At Cedars, she meekly told Billy she was carrying his grandchild. An over-joyed Billy proceeded to lift her from the ground in excitement. He promised her Bill would come around, and the three would make a beautiful family. He went to see Bill and let him know that this could be his wake-up call to be a better person, and also hinted that this was Bill’s chance to one-up by being a better father and husband than he himself had been.

After several negative pregnancy tests, Lizzie was distraught to find her miracle baby was not real. A heavyhearted Lizzie attended Tammy’s memorial service alone. An apologetic Bill tried to caress and comfort Lizzie, but she was still upset with him, and tried to just bluntly tell him there was no baby. Before she could get it out though, Bill began an impassioned speech about how he wanted to be a family with her and the child, whom he now felt was a gift from God, and a second chance for them both. Lizzie was unsure, and seemed to think about coming clean, but Bill’s insistence that he wanted to be with her forced her to keep her secret.

After thinking she saw Sarah in the church parking lot, Lizzie was convinced this child with Bill as something she needed to stay sane. So she asked Bill to go away with her to the Bauer Cabin, where she planned to seduce him to become pregnant. After finding a bear in the cabin though, and feeling guilty about the sweet side Bill was showing her now that he thought she was having his baby, Lizzie broke down and ran from the cabin. Bill chased her, and as they struggled on a hilltop, Lizzie told him she was not pregnant. A confused Bill tried to clutch her to him, but Lizzie stumbled and came close to falling into traffic. She was saved by her former husband Jonathan though, and thus she found out he was still alive.

Though he lied to her at first, Lizzie soon found Sarah also lived, and started building a relationship with her baby again. She and Jonathan even tried to work things out, and get married again, but her attraction to Bill, and her realization that Jonathan could never love her like he loved Tammy prevented her from marrying him. Not wanting her daughter to grow up in a loveless marriage, she fled the ceremony, and reconciled with Bill. Things went sour for her and Jonathan after that, and he even kidnapped her briefly. Lizzie thought him a danger, and tried to take Sarah after this. On top of their entire drama, Alan was still trying to interfere and hurt Jon, while taking Sarah.

Making the hardest decision of her life, Lizzie kissed Sarah good-bye, and allowed Jonathan to flee with her, in hopes of saving her from the fate of growing up in the cold, lonely, loveless Spaulding home like she herself had. She could not go with them, for in exchange for Sarah’s freedom, Lizzie had offered herself for her grandfather to control.

Bill Lewis was having none of that however, and eventually rescued her from Alan’s clutches, through a plot his sister Dinah had set into motion. Still angry with Bill for his lack of commitment to her, and his continued sexual relationship with Ava Peralta, Lizzie railed against him. Bill won her back over though, and the two had sex. In the after glow, Lizzie worried aloud that Bill would grow tired of her, and end their relationship. He surprised her by asking her to move in with him, and she gleefully accepted.

As he promised, Bill made sure Alan would not go after Sarah. He assured Lizzie that her home was now with him, and that though he had tried to fight the hold she had on him, he refused to lose her ever again.

Lizzie's bliss, as usual, was short lived. She soon found that Bill was involved in a plot with his sister Dinah to bring down the Spauldings. Bill tried to tell her it was just business, and that he had fallen in love with her, but she forced him to choose between her and the company, and when he couldn't make a clear decision, she left him.

After Lizzie was found by Bill after her kidnapping by Dinah Marler and Grady Foley, Bill fell into a coma and Lizzie sat vigil by his side. Unaware of who her kidnapper was, Lizzie turned to Cyrus Foley to clear Bill's name (unaware that Cyrus had helped Grady cover up his role in her kidnapping). When Bill awoke from his coma with no memory of whether he had played a part in her kidnapping, he was pushed away by Lizzie, who turned to Cyrus for comfort. Bill went in search of Lizzie's father, Phillip, for help, but he missed him at the cabin and saw a photo of Lizzie with her father. He went outside to look for Phillip, fell, and hit his head; when he awoke, he saw his father, Billy, and recovered his memory, realizing both Grady and Cyrus's roles in Lizzie's kidnapping (but unaware that Dinah had also played a part). Bill confronted Grady and was later abducted by him and Cyrus to keep him quiet; Cyrus, however, started feeling guilty and was going to take Lizzie to Bill when Bill showed up and told her the truth.

Lizzie's father returned, arriving after spotting Coop (who just had a bad car crash) and rushed him to Cedars' Hospital, went to the church to tell Beth, just as Beth was about to remarry Alan. He first saw daughter Lizzie when she went to see Coop's car after learning of his accident. Lizzie was afraid and angry at her father, never recovering from his previous attempt to kidnap her, sister Emma, her brothers (James and Zach) and Jude Bauer. She rejected all attempts at reconciling and had him arrested for her kidnapping.
