= Crystal Hunt =

American actress

- Born: February 5, 1985 (age 41); Clearwater, Florida, U.S.
- Occupations: Actress, producer
- Years active: 1991-present

Crystal Hunt (born February 5, 1985) is an American actress and producer. She is known for playing Lizzie Spaulding on the CBS soap opera Guiding Light (2003–06) and Stacy Morasco on the ABC soap opera One Life to Live (2009–10, 2012).

== Life and career ==
Hunt was born in Clearwater, Florida. She started her career as a child performer, appearing the film Problem Child 2 (1991). Hunt has starred in many commercials, including one for The Walt Disney Company's 25th anniversary celebration and an anti-drug advertisement with *NSYNC. In 2003, she was cast as Lizzie Spaulding, the troubled daughter of the long-suffering couple Philip and Beth Raines, on the CBS soap opera Guiding Light, which she played from 2003 to 2006. She received a Daytime Emmy Award nomination in 2005 for Outstanding Younger Actress in a Drama Series for the role.

Hunt appeared in the 2005 film The Derby Stallion, and appeared in the 2007 Universal Pictures film Sydney White as Demetria "Dinky" Rosemead Hodgekiss. She joined ABC soap opera One Life to Live in February 2009, playing Stacy Morasco. She left the show on February 16, 2010. She returned to the show as the ghostly Stacy in March 2010, and in Clint Buchanan's vision of Hell in January 2012.

Hunt starred in the 2015 reality series Queens of Drama, and later in the Pureflix soap opera, Hilton Head Island. In 2019, she starred, created and produced web-series Mood Swings.

== Filmography ==
=== Film ===
| Year | Title | Role | Notes |
|---|---|---|---|
| 1991 | Problem Child 2 | Daughter (uncredited) | |
| 2005 | The Derby Stallion | Jill Overton | |
| 2007 | Sydney White | Demetria "Dinky" Rosemead Hodgekiss | |
| 2009 | NYC Underground | Hannah | |
| 2014 | 23 Blast | Molly | |
| 2015 | Magic Mike XXL | Lauren | |
| 2017 | Lycan | | Producer |

=== Television ===
| Year | Title | Role | Notes |
|---|---|---|---|
| 2003–06 | Guiding Light | Lizzie Spaulding | Series regular Nominated — Daytime Emmy Award for Outstanding Younger Actress in a Drama Series (2005); Nominated — Soap Opera Digest Award for Outstanding Villainess in a Drama Series – Daytime (2005) |
| 2009-10, 2012 | One Life to Live | Stacy Morasco | Series regular |
| 2015 | Queens of Drama | Herself | 10 episodes |
| 2017 | Misguided | Bloss | Episode: "The Audition" |
| 2017-2018 | Hilton Head Island | Elisha Trisk | Series regular, 32 episodes |
| 2019 | Mood Swings | Farrah | Series regular, 8 episodes, also executive producer |
