= V.C. Andrews' Dawn =

Television films directed by Linda-Lisa Hayter

- Based on: Dawn by V. C. Andrews
- Written by: Gregory Small
- Directed by: Linda-Lisa Hayter
- Starring: Brec Bassinger; Donna Mills; Fran Drescher; Joey McIntyre; Jesse Metcalfe
- Country of origin: United States
- Original language: English

Production
- Producers: Merideth Finn; Michele Weiss; Timothy Johnson; Stacy Mandelberg
- Editor: Devin Taylor
- Production companies: VC Secrets Productions; A+E Networks

Original release
- Network: Lifetime
- Release: July 8 – July 29, 2023

V.C. Andrews' Dawn is an American limited television thriller drama series based on the novel with the same name by V. C. Andrews and directed by Linda-Lisa Hayter. It stars Brec Bassinger as Dawn Longchamp and Donna Mills as her wicked grandmother Lillian Cutler. The series includes four movies: Dawn, Secrets of the Morning, Twilight's Child, and Midnight Whispers. It premiered on Lifetime on July 8, 2023, and aired through July 29.

== Cast ==
=== Dawn ===
- Brec Bassinger as Dawn Longchamp aka Eugenia Grace Cutler
- Khobe Clarke as Jimmy Longchamp
- Elyse Maloway as Clara Jean Cutler
- Dane Schioler as Philip Cutler
- Jason Cermak as Randolph Cutler
- Miranda Frigon as Laura Jean Cutler
- Liz Wallace as Sissy
- Jesse Metcalfe as Ormand Longchamp
- Donna Mills as Lillian Cutler

=== Secrets of the Morning ===
- Brec Bassinger as Dawn Longchamp aka Eugenia Grace Cutler
- Khobe Clarke as Jimmy Longchamp
- Corey Woods as Tricia
- Elyse Maloway as Clara Jean Cutler
- Dane Schioler as Philip Cutler
- Jason Cermak as Randolph Cutler
- Miranda Frigon as Laura Jean Cutler
- Jennifer Higgin as Emily Booth
- Dean Redman as Luther
- Bronwen Smith as Charlotte Booth
- Joey McIntyre as Michael Sutton
- Fran Drescher as Agnes Morris
- Donna Mills as Lillian Cutler

=== Twilight's Child ===
- Brec Bassinger as Dawn Longchamp aka Eugenia Grace Cutler
- Khobe Clarke as Jimmy Longchamp
- Piper Scott as Fern
- Emma Oliver as Christie Longchamp
- Elyse Maloway as Clara Jean Cutler
- Corey Woods as Tricia
- Dane Schioler as Philip Cutler
- Jason Cermak as Randolph Cutler
- Miranda Frigon as Laura Jean Cutler
- Matthew James Dowden as Bronson Alcott
- Chelsey Reist as Betty Ann Monroe Cutler
- Dean Redman as Luther
- Bronwen Smith as Charlotte
- Jennifer Higgin as Emily Booth
- Joey McIntyre as Michael Sutton
- Donna Mills as Lillian Cutler

=== Midnight Whispers ===
- Brec Bassinger as Dawn Longchamp aka Eugenia Grace Cutler
- Megan Best as Christie Longchamp
- Khobe Clarke as Jimmy Longchamp
- Clara Alexandrova as Fern
- Corey Woods as Tricia
- Sawyer Fraser as Jefferson Longchamp
- Emrik Lopez as Gavin Longchamp
- Matthew James Dowden as Bronson Alcott
- Dane Schioler as Philip Cutler
- Chelsey Reist as Betty Ann Cutler
- Dean Redman as Luther
- Bronwen Smith as Charlotte
- Joey McIntyre as Michael Sutton

Also starring Helena Marie as Sally Longchamp, Tanja Dixon-Warren as Mrs. Boston, Madeleine Kelders as Mrs. Bradley, and Cheryl Swan as Mrs. Dalton

== Production ==
On September 15, 2022, it was reported that Lifetime and A+E would produce V.C. Andrews's Dawn film series for airing in 2023. It produced by VC Secrets Productions with Merideth Finn and Michele Weiss who also executive produced Lifetime movies Flowers in the Attic and Petals on the Wind. The leading roles were cast with Brec Bassinger as Dawn and Donna Mills as her wicked grandmother Lillian Cutler. Fran Drescher, Joey McIntyre, Jesse Metcalfe, Khobe Clarke, Jason Cermak, Miranda Frigon, Elyse Maloway, Dane Schioler, Corey Woods and Helena Marie round out cast.

== Reception ==
The first film received average reviews from critics, who noted Mills and Bassinger's performances. Joel Keller from Decider wrote in his review: "While it’s tempting to give V.C. Andrews’ Dawn a recommendation just on the strength of the performances of Mills and Bassinger, the rest of the first episode is cheaply made with an underbaked story and clunky dialogue." Jasmine Blu from the TV Fanatic give it the positive review praising performances: "Bassinger had a daunting task ahead of her playing off against the iconic Donna Mills, but damn if she didn't hold her own!"

== Episodes ==
| No. overall | No. in season | Title | Directed by | Written by | Original release date |
|---|---|---|---|---|---|
| 1 | 1 | "Dawn" | Linda-Lisa Hayter | Richard Blaney | July 8, 2023 |
| 2 | 2 | "Secrets of the Morning" | Linda-Lisa Hayter | Richard Blaney and Gregory Small | July 15, 2023 |
| 3 | 3 | "Twilight's Child" | Jacquie Gould | Richard Blaney and Gregory Small | July 22, 2023 |
| 4 | 4 | "Midnight Whispers" | Jacquie Gould | Alison Lea Bingeman | July 29, 2023 |
