= Chelsey Reist =

Canadian actress, television host and dancer

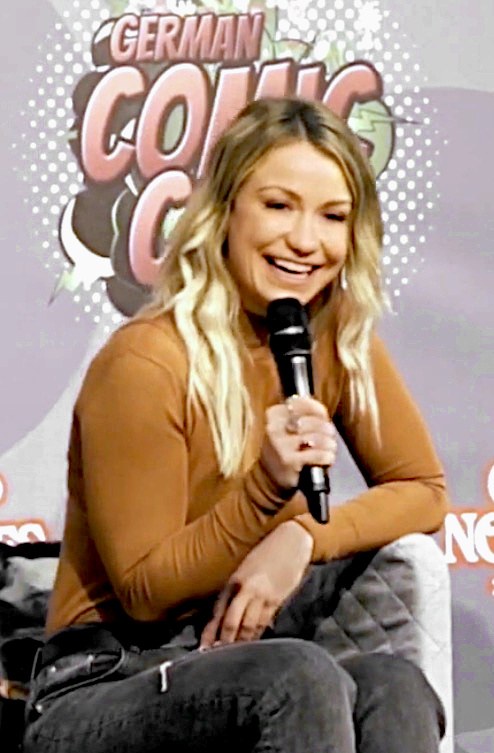
- Reist at Ahoy Comic Con 2020
- Born: Chelsey Marie Reist; January 4, 1987 (age 39); Edmonton, Alberta, Canada
- Education: Capilano University
- Occupations: Actress, TV host
- Years active: 2009–present
- Known for: The 100

Chelsey Marie Reist (born January 4, 1987 and raised in Edmonton, Alberta) is a Canadian actress, television host, and dancer. Her credits include 12 Rounds: Reloaded (2013), Embrace of the Vampire (2013), Psych (2014), The 100 (2014–2018), Dark Harvest (2016), Narcoleap (2018–2020), V.C. Andrews' Dawn, Twilight's Child, Midnight Whispers (2023).

== Life and career ==
After graduating high school, Reist moved to Vancouver to attend Capilano University, and graduated with a degree in Acting for the Stage and Screen.

From 2014 to 2018 she played Harper McIntyre in The CW's sci-fi television series The 100. She starred as Rachel in the 2012 horror film No Tell Motel which screened at the Cannes Film Festival and she appeared in 12 Rounds: Reloaded starring WWE wrestler Randy Orton. In 2013, she appeared in the remake of the 1995 horror film Embrace of the Vampire starring Sharon Hinnendael. Reist also hosted the Canadian television series Discovering Great Towns. She appeared in movies Twilight's Child and Midnight Whispers, and played Aunt Bets in V.C. Andrews' Dawn in 2023.

== Filmography ==
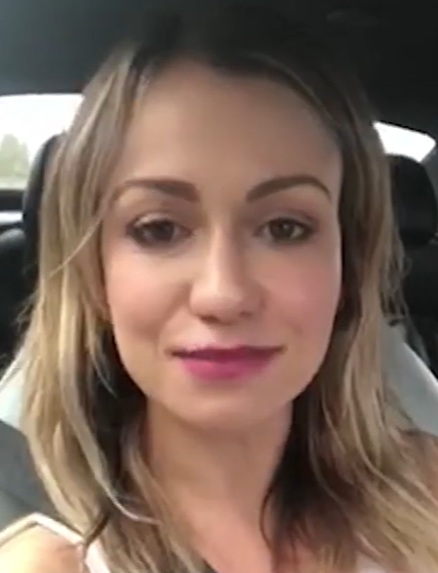
Chelsey Reist GCC München 2018

=== Film ===
Year	Title	Role	Notes
2009	The Compass	Girl in the Red Coat	Direct-to-video film
2012	Crowsnest	Amanda	
2012	Mon Ami	Crystal Halbern	
2012	No Tell Motel	Rachel	
2013	12 Rounds 2: Reloaded	Amber	
2013	Embrace of the Vampire	Sarah Campbell	Direct-to-video film
2014	Arson Mom	Barry's Woman	
2016	Wandering Hearts	Amanda	
2016	Dark Harvest	Alexis Caine	
2019	Benchwarmers 2: Breaking Balls	Annie	
2020	Murphy's Law	Billy Murphy	Short film

=== Television ===
Year	Title	Role	Notes
2010	Discovering Great Towns	Herself	Host; 6 episodes
2011	True Justice	Gangster Mole / Meth Girl	2 episodes
2011	City Lights	Herself	Host; 2 episodes
2011, 2014	Psych	Beautiful Woman	2 episodes
2013	The Tomorrow People	Krysten	1 episode
2013	A Bride for Christmas	Patty	TV film
2014	Veiled Threats	Dianne Parry	TV film
2014	Oh Say Can You See	Carla	TV film
2014–2018	The 100	Harper McIntyre	Recurring role (seasons 1–5)
2015	Cedar Cove	Jennifer	1 episode
2016	Aftermath	Anna	1 episode
2016	Christmas Cookies	Kelly	TV film
2017	Supernatural	Dede	1 episode
2018–2020	Narcoleap	Kelsey	14 episodes
2018	Van Helsing	Kelly	Episode: "Been Away"
2020	The Christmas Ring	Trish Jones	TV film (Hallmark)
2021	My Husband's Killer Girlfriend	Valerie Dobbs	TV film (Lifetime)
2021	Sealed with a Kiss: Wedding March 6	Jess	TV film (Hallmark)
2024	Tracker	Chelsea	1 episode

== Awards ==
Year	Award	Category	Work	Result	Ref
2019	Leo Awards	Best Performance by a Female in a Web Series	Narcoleap	Nominated	
2021	Leo Awards	Best Performance by a Female in a Web Series	Narcoleap	Nominated	
2021	TO Webfest Award	Best Ensemble Cast (shared)	Narcoleap	Won	
2021	London Webfest - June Award	Best Female Performance	Murphy's Law	Won	
