= Heaven (Andrews novel) =

Novel in V. C. Andrews' Casteel series

- Author: V. C. Andrews
- Language: English
- Series: Casteel series
- Genre: Gothic horror Family saga
- Publisher: Simon & Schuster
- Publication date: November 1st, 1985
- Publication place: United States
- Media type: Print
- Pages: 440
- ISBN: 0671605364
- Followed by: Dark Angel

Heaven is the first book in the Casteel series by author V. C. Andrews and was followed by Dark Angel, Fallen Hearts, Gates of Paradise, and Web of Dreams. It is also the first name of the main character. It was first published on November 1, 1985, and is one of Andrews' most popular works.

== Plot ==
In 1961 a ten-year-old Heaven Leigh Casteel is woken by her Granny and taken to the grave of Leigh 'Angel' Casteel. Granny tells Heaven that Leigh is her biological mother, that she came from a rich Boston family and she died giving birth to Heaven when she was only fourteen years old. Granny then gives Heaven a doll that strongly resembles her apart from its light blonde hair. She tells Heaven the doll is an exact replica of Leigh and that the doll will lead Heaven to her mother's family, changing the course of Heaven's life.

Four years later, Heaven is now fourteen, living in extreme poverty with her family in the mountains of West Virginia near the town of Winnerow. The family is originally made up of Granny Annie and Grandpa Toby; Luke, their son; Sarah, Luke's second wife, and Heaven and her half-siblings — Tom, Fanny, Keith, and Jane. They share a one bedroom shack divided by sheets with a single stove for heat. Luke is still haunted by the death of his first wife and rarely speaks to Heaven. He is often absent and Sarah struggles to take care of the children and her parents-in-law. Most Winnerow residents look down on the Casteels and call them "hillbilly scum". Determined to prove the snobs wrong, Heaven and Tom work hard at school. Heaven begins to develop a relationship with the new boy in town, Logan Stonewall. Luke contracts syphilis from a local brothel, causing Sarah's next child to be born dead. Heaven's Granny passes away the same day. The stillbirth is the last straw for Sarah and she disappears, leaving a note saying she has gone to "a better place". The children are left to fend for themselves, with Heaven too proud and embarrassed to accept Logan's offers of help. Heaven now has to be mother, take care of the shack and her frail grandfather. She is often unable to attend school.

Luke occasionally shows up with food but his attempts to make steady money fail, and eventually he comes up with a plan to sell his children for $500 each. Keith and Jane go to a married couple, Fanny is bought by the local preacher, and Tom by a farmer. Heaven is left alone with her grandfather and Luke. One night Luke approaches Heaven while she pretends to sleep and strokes her hair. Toby intervenes, which causes an argument about whether Heaven should stay or be sent away, with Grandpa Toby insisting that Heaven doesn't belong to Luke. Heaven does not realize what Luke's intentions were and feels deeply hurt by her grandfather's rejection. A few days later, Heaven is sold to Kitty and Cal Dennison. Although Heaven is hopeful she can make her new parents love her, Kitty is often harsh with her and physically violent. It is revealed that Kitty was once pregnant with Luke's child, but after Luke returned with Leigh and announced they were married, Kitty attempted a home abortion that went badly wrong and left her infertile. Cal and Heaven become close due to Kitty's mistreatment of them both, and Heaven begins to look up to him as a father figure, but Cal eventually pressures her into having sex with him. Although Heaven feels deep guilt and shame over this, the feeling of being needed is so important that she cannot say no to him.

Kitty becomes sick (later revealed to be breast cancer) and the three go back to Winnerrow to get help from Kitty's family. Heaven is briefly reunited with Tom and Fanny. Fanny is distant with Heaven and seems to be avoiding her. Heaven tries to keep her distance from Logan but he begs to see her and Heaven agrees to meet him the next day. When she goes back to the house, she is ambushed by Cal. Kitty's younger sister sees Cal touching Heaven's breast and quickly tells the family. The next day, Heaven meets Logan as promised but Logan confronts her about her relationship with Cal. Heaven admits that she and Cal have slept together but tries to explain it was out of gratitude not love. Feeling betrayed, Logan runs away. Heaven returns to the hospital to find Kitty awake. Kitty tells Heaven that Luke was looking for her, wanting to apologize. Heaven now has two choices: live with Luke and his new wife, or find her mother's family in Boston and see if they will accept her. Unable to forgive her father for the way he treated her and for selling his children, Heaven decides to go to Boston. Cal drives Heaven to the airport but he doesn't stay. Tom arrives to say goodbye, accompanied by Fanny. Fanny reveals the reason she was avoiding Heaven: she is pregnant with the preacher's baby and has to stay hidden so the preacher and his wife can pretend the baby is theirs, with the preacher's wife faking her own pregnancy. Fanny tells Heaven she loves her, then she and Tom leave. Heaven picks up a local paper and sees Kitty's obituary. She thinks of how Cal drove her to the airport without once mentioning that Kitty had died. Realising he wants to start a new life without her, Heaven feels betrayed. Even though Cal had repeatedly claimed he loved her, he abandoned Heaven as soon as he could, just like Luke. All she can do now is hope she finds love and acceptance with her mother's family.

== Adaptation ==
Lifetime produced an adaptation of Heaven that aired on July 27, 2019, starring Annalise Basso, Chris McNally, James Rittinger, Jessica Clement, Chris William Martin, and Julie Benz. A special edition of the film aired on August 3, 2019, that featured behind the scenes interviews with Basso, McNally, and Rittinger.
