= Disappearance of Tara Calico =

1988 unexplained disappearance in New Mexico, US

Tara Calico
- Portrait of Tara Calico at age 16
- Born: Tara Leigh Calico; February 28, 1969; Belen, New Mexico, U.S.
- Disappeared: September 20, 1988 (aged 19); NM 47, New Mexico, U.S.
- Status: Missing for 38 years and 23 days
- Education: Belen High School (Class of 1987)
- Known for: Missing person
- Parents: David Calico (father); Patty Doel (mother)

Tara Leigh Calico (born February 28, 1969) is an American missing person who disappeared near her home in Belen, New Mexico, on September 20, 1988 at the age of 19. She is widely believed to have been kidnapped. No definitive evidence of her fate or whereabouts has ever been found.

In July 1989, a Polaroid photo of an unidentified young woman and boy, who were gagged and seemingly bound, was televised to the public after it was found in a convenience store parking lot in Port St. Joe, Florida. Family and friends thought the woman in the photo resembled Calico. Analysis of the photo by law enforcement investigators produced contradictory results. Scotland Yard analyzed the photo and concluded the woman was Calico, but a second analysis by the Los Alamos National Laboratory disagreed. An FBI analysis of the photo was inconclusive.

Calico's case received extensive coverage on television programs such as A Current Affair, Unsolved Mysteries, and America's Most Wanted. It was also profiled on The Oprah Winfrey Show and 48 Hours.

== Disappearance ==
On Tuesday, September 20, 1988, Calico left her home at about 9:30 A.M. to go on her daily bike ride along New Mexico State Road 47. She rode that route almost every morning and was sometimes accompanied by her mother, Patty Doel. However, Doel stopped riding with Calico after she felt that she had been stalked by a motorist. She advised her daughter to think about carrying mace, but Calico rejected the idea. On the morning of Calico's disappearance, she had told Doel to come and get her if she was not home by noon, as she had plans to play tennis with her boyfriend at 12:30. When her daughter did not return, Doel went searching for her along Calico's usual bike route but could not find her; she then contacted the police. Pieces of Calico's Sony Walkman and a cassette tape were later discovered along the road. Doel believed that she might have dropped them in an attempt to mark her trail. Several people saw Calico riding her bicycle, which has never been found. No one witnessed her presumed abduction, although several witnesses observed a light-colored pickup truck (possibly a 1953 Ford) with a camper shell following closely behind her.

== Photographs ==
=== Toyota van ===
The two unidentified persons seen in the Polaroid found in June 1989. Some people believe the woman is Calico. The boy in the background remains unidentified.

On June 15, 1989, a Polaroid photo of an unidentified young woman and a boy, both gagged with black duct tape and seemingly bound, was discovered in the parking lot of a convenience store in Port St. Joe, Florida. The woman who found the photo said that it was in a parking space where a white windowless Toyota cargo van had been parked when she arrived at the store. She said that the van was being driven by a man with a mustache who appeared to be in his 30s. Police set up roadblocks to intercept the vehicle, but the man has never been identified. According to Polaroid officials, the picture had to have been taken after May 1989 because the particular film used in the photograph was not available until then.

The photo was broadcast on A Current Affair in July, and Doel was contacted by friends who had seen the show and thought the woman resembled Calico. Relatives of Michael Henley, also of New Mexico, who had disappeared in April 1988, saw the episode and said that they believed he was the boy in the photo.

Doel and Henley's parents both met with investigators and examined the Polaroid. Doel said that she was "convinced" it was Calico. She also noted that a scar on the woman's leg was identical to one that Calico had received in a car accident. In addition, a paperback copy of V.C. Andrews' My Sweet Audrina, said to be one of Calico's favorite books, can be seen lying next to the woman. Scotland Yard analyzed the photo and concluded that the woman was Calico, but a second analysis by the Los Alamos National Laboratory (LANL) disagreed; a forensic scientist at LANL said that the woman is "definitely not Tara". An FBI analysis of the photo was inconclusive.

Henley's mother said that she was "almost certain" it was Michael in the Polaroid. The identification of the boy in the photograph as Henley is considered unlikely: his remains were discovered in June 1990 in the Zuñi Mountains, about 7 miles (11 km) from his family's campsite from which he had disappeared and 75 miles (121 km) from where Calico disappeared. Police believe that Henley wandered off and subsequently died of exposure.

=== Other photos ===
Two other Polaroid photographs, possibly of Calico, have surfaced over the years. The first was found near a construction site in Montecito, California, on July 19, 1989, and is a blurry photo of a girl's face with tape covering her mouth and light blue striped fabric behind her, "similar to that on the pillow in the Toyota van photo". It was taken on film that was not available until June 1989. The second shows "a woman loosely bound in gauze, her eyes covered with more gauze and large black-framed glasses", with a male passenger beside her on an Amtrak train. The film used was not available until February 1990. Calico's mother believed the first one was Tara, but thought that the second may have been a hoax. Her sister stated, "They had a striking, uncalming resemblance. As for me, I will not rule them out. But keep in mind our family has had to identify many other photographs and all but those three were ruled out." The Doe Network maintained a case file on all three polaroid photographs, which was closed for unknown reasons.

In 2009, twenty years after the Polaroid photo was found and shared by the media, pictures of a boy were sent to the Port St. Joe police chief, David Barnes. He received two letters, postmarked June 10 and August 10, 2009, from Albuquerque, New Mexico. One letter contained a photo, printed on copy paper, of a young boy with sandy brown hair. Someone had drawn a black band in ink on the photo, over the boy's mouth, as if it were covered in tape as in the 1989 picture. The second letter contained an original image of the boy. On August 12, The Star newspaper in Port St. Joe received a third letter, also postmarked in Albuquerque on August 10 and depicting the same image, of a boy with black marker drawn over his mouth. The boy has not been confirmed to be the same one as in the previous photo. None of the letters contained a return address or a note indicating the child's identity, making the officials there believe it may have something to do with the disappearance of Tara Calico. The letters were sent at the same time that a self-proclaimed psychic had called about Calico, saying that she had met a runaway in California with whom she worked in a strip club; this girl was eventually murdered. The caller said she had dreams suggesting the runaway may have been Calico and that she may be buried in California. Searches did not lead to any discoveries. The photos were given to the FBI for further investigation in hope of finding fingerprints or possible DNA evidence.

== Later developments ==
In late August 1993, Calico's family received a tip from a "sincere and concerned" woman who had heard the sound of digging the day after Calico's disappearance, at a site about 7 miles (11 km) south of Belen. Authorities subsequently conducted excavations at the site using backhoes.

In 1998, Calico was declared officially dead. A judge ruled her death a homicide.

In 2008, Rene Rivera, the sheriff of Valencia County, reported that he received information that two teenagers had accidentally hit Calico with a truck, panicked, and subsequently killed her. According to Rivera, the boys, who knew Calico, drove up behind her in a truck and some form of an accident followed. Calico later died and those responsible covered up the crime. Rivera stated that he knew the names of those involved, but that, without a body, he could not make a case. He did not release the evidence that led him to this conclusion. Calico's stepfather, John Doel, said that the sheriff should not have made these comments if he was not willing to arrest anyone and that strong circumstantial evidence should be enough for a conviction.

In October 2013, a six-person task force was established to reinvestigate Calico's disappearance. As of 2017, no arrests have been made and the case remains open.

On October 1, 2019, the FBI announced that they are "offering a reward of up to $20,000 for precise details leading to the identification or location of Tara Leigh Calico and information leading to the arrest and conviction of those responsible for her disappearance."

In September 2021, the Valencia County Sheriff's Office and the New Mexico State Police issued a statement that they have a new lead in the case, and that the focus of a sealed warrant for an unknown private residence located within Valencia County has been issued; however, no further details were provided.

On June 13, 2023, the Valencia County Sheriff's Office announced a breakthrough in the 1988 disappearance. Sheriff Denise Vigil and other law enforcement officers spoke at a press conference regarding the Calico case. "At this time, law enforcement believes there is sufficient evidence to submit this investigation to the district attorney's office for review of potential charges," Vigil said. "Currently, the identities and specifics of the persons of interest are sealed by the court and will remain so until a court order otherwise".

== Family ==
Calico's father, David J. Calico, was beaten and mugged by two men in Albuquerque, New Mexico. He died as a result on November 2, 2002, at the age of 64. Her mother, Patty Doel, died on May 11, 2006, in Port Charlotte, Florida, from health complications after a series of strokes.

== See also ==
- List of people who disappeared mysteriously (1980s)
