= Dark Harvest (2016 film) =

- Dark Harvest film poster
- Directed by: James Hutson
- Written by: James Hutson
- Produced by: Chad Barager; James Hutson; P. Lynn Johnson; Tim Laplante; James McLeod; Marc Petey; Ryan Petey; Tygh Runyan; Kevin Speckmaier; Zach Steele
- Starring: James Hutson; A.C. Peterson; Cheech Marin; Tygh Runyan; Hugh Dillon; Chelsey Reist; Derek Hamilton; Bernie Coulson; Sarah-Jane Redmond
- Cinematography: Ryan Petey
- Edited by: Aram Coen; Zach Steele
- Music by: Aiko Fukushima
- Production companies: First Player Films; Greendale Productions
- Release date: 2 September 2016 (United States)
- Running time: 90 minute
- Country: Canada
- Language: English

Dark Harvest is a 2016 Canadian thriller film written and directed by James Hutson as his directorial debut. The film stars Cheech Marin in his first marijuana film in 33 years. After success on the festival circuit, the film gained a distribution deal for 2018.

== Plot ==
On the eve of its becoming legal, a marijuana grower is murdered. His best friend Carter (James Hutson), against the advice of his mentor Ricardo (Cheech Marin), teams up with narcotics investigator Bernie (A.C. Peterson) to discover the reasons and find the killer.

== Cast ==
- James Hutson as Carter Holmes
- A. C. Peterson as Bernie
- Cheech Marin as Ricardo
- Tygh Runyan as Zack
- Hugh Dillon as Vincent
- Chelsey Reist as Alexis Caine
- Bernie Coulson as Frank Becker
- Sarah-Jane Redmond as Mrs. Grant
- Jed Rees as Skeezy
- Rekha Sharma as Coroner
- Norm Sherry as Officer Hudson
- Derek Hamilton as Mark White
- Viv Leacock as Earl Freeman
- Alex Miro as David (as Al Miro)
- Andrea Stefancikova as Candy
- Danny Wattley as Detective Watts
- Kurt Max Runte as Sergeant
- Kwesi Ameyaw as Carl
- Giacomo Baessato as Simon
- Yumi Nagashima as Yoko
- Philip Granger as Det. Harvey Stansfield
- Tim Laplante as Primo
- Kristin Kowalski as Receptionist

== Production ==
Filmmaker James Hutson was inspired to create this film based upon his experiences acting in training films for his local police department. The role of Bernie was played by Hutson's acting teacher A.C. Peterson who at the time was recovering from hip surgery. The inclusion of a bear trap injuring the character of Bernie, allowed the film to take advantage of the limp resulting from Peterson's healing hip, and became the "inciting incident" and thrust of the film.

== Reception ==
The film received positive response from The Hollywood Reporter, praising Cheech Marin's stoic performance, and writing that "strong performances and compelling atmosphere make up for the overly convoluted plotting."

=== Awards and nominations ===
- 2016, Won "Audience Award" at Edmonton International Film Festival
- 2016, Won "Canadian Feature Award" at Edmonton International Film Festival
- 2016, Won "Best Picture" at Columbia Gorge International Film Festival
- 2016, Won "Best Picture" at Columbia Gorge International Film Festival
- 2016, Won "Best Picture" at Oregon Independent Film Festival
- 2016, Won "Best Supporting Actor" for Cheech Marin at Oregon Independent Film Festival
- 2016, Won "Best Thriller" at Oregon Independent Film Festival
- 2016, Won "Best Actor" for Alan C. Peterson at CannaBus Culture Film Festival
- 2017, Nominated for Best Direction in a Motion Picture by Leo Awards
