= Web of Dreams =

1990 novel by Andrew Neiderman

- Original cover
- Author: V. C. Andrews
- Cover artist: Richard Newton
- Language: English
- Series: The Casteel Series
- Genre: Gothic horror/family saga
- Publisher: Pocket Books
- Publication date: February 1990
- Publication place: United States
- Pages: 426
- ISBN: 0-671-67066-2
- OCLC: 24246239
- Preceded by: Gates of Paradise

Web of Dreams was written in 1990 by V. C. Andrews ghostwriter Andrew Neiderman. It is the fifth and final novel in The Casteel Series and is as a prequel to Heaven. Told primarily from the viewpoint of Heaven Casteel's mother, Leigh VanVoreen, the novel explains her secrets and circumstances as a 13-year-old girl who was forced to flee her wealthy Boston home, resulting in her dying in childbirth and leaving behind her daughter, Heaven, to be raised in the hills of West Virginia.

== Plot summary ==
The novel opens with Annie Casteel Stonewall returning to Farthinggale Manor ("Farthy") for the funeral of her father, Troy Tatterton. Hoping to finally put the past to rest, Annie feels drawn to the suite that used to be occupied by her great-grandmother, Jillian. There she discovers an old diary hidden in a back drawer. The diary belonged to Leigh Van Voreen, Annie's grandmother and Heaven's mother. Surprised by the discovery, Annie begins to read the tragic story of Leigh.

The diary begins in 1950s Boston, where 12-year-old Leigh Van Voreen lives with her father, cruise-ship magnate Cleave Van Voreen, and her mother, Jillian, a beautiful socialite. Leigh's happy life is shattered when her mother leaves her father for a younger man, Tony Tatterton, the wealthy owner of Tatterton Toys. After Jillian marries Tony, she and Leigh move to Tony's estate, Farthinggale Manor. Leigh's only friend on the estate is Troy Tatterton, Tony's 4-year-old brother, and they spend a lot of time together until Leigh is placed in Winterhaven, an exclusive boarding school for girls.

During summer vacation, Leigh serves as the model for a new line of toys that will be called portrait dolls. During the modeling sessions, Tony has Leigh pose nude and starts to make advances towards her. He claims that Jillian refused to have a sexual relationship with him, saying it would ruin her face and figure. Leigh goes to Cleave to ask for help, but he has remarried and is too busy with his new wife and work to listen to her problems. Leigh tells Jillian what is happening, but Jillian accuses her of exaggerating. After Tony finishes the doll, he presents it to her on her birthday; soon afterwards, Tony rapes Leigh one night while Jillian is away, the next morning acting like nothing had happened. Leigh hides in Jillian's room with the door locked, but she discovers that Tony already has a key, made when Jillian rejected his advances. He attacks Leigh again, and when she tries to threaten him, he laughingly tells her that it was Jillian's idea! When Jillian returns, Leigh tries to tell her that Tony raped her, but Jillian accuses Leigh of lying and says that Tony had told her that Leigh was the one who had made advances during the modeling session and tried to get him to have sex with her. Leigh is shocked and saddened by her mother's decision to believe Tony over her own daughter.

A few weeks later, Leigh discovers that she's pregnant. When she tells her mother, Jillian screams at her that "nice girls don't go all the way!" Leigh realizes that Tony was right and Jillian had chosen her own daughter as a substitute to avoid having sex with Tony. Leigh flees Farthinggale with a few possessions, some money, and her portrait doll, Angel. Intending to live with her grandmother Jana in Texas, Leigh purchases a train ticket in Atlanta but misses her connection and is stranded. A young stranger named Luke Casteel cheers her up. He asks about Angel and she admits that it's modeled after her. Luke tells her that "Angel" is a better name for her than Leigh, and calls Leigh "Angel" from then on.

Leigh confides in Luke about the circumstances of her pregnancy, and he drives her to a motel so that she can rest. When Leigh asks him to stay because she's afraid to be alone, he agrees. When she wakes up in the middle of the night, he tells her that he has fallen in love with her and wants to be her baby's father. She thinks she's dreaming, and when she later wakes up in Luke's arms, she asks him about it and he talks passionately about their future and she falls completely in love with him. Although they've only known each other for a day, they marry and return to Luke's West Virginia mountain home, where teenage marriage is more socially acceptable. After meeting Luke's parents, Annie and Toby, Leigh works hard around the shack and ignores the local residents' stares and rude remarks. Luke is deeply in love with Leigh and plans to build a house in town for their little family. Whenever Luke drinks alcohol, Leigh talks to him sternly, and he credits her with inspiring him to be a better person.

The diary ends with Leigh experiencing labor pains while out for a walk with Luke on the mountain. Luke talks about their future, telling Leigh that she is the love of his life. As they walk back, Leigh stopped to stare at the stars, telling Luke that when she went to sleep that night, she wanted to feel like she was going to sleep in heaven. Leigh dies in childbirth later that night. Her death is the apparent reason Luke becomes the cruel man depicted in Heaven.

After finishing the diary, Annie finds a note from a private investigator hired by Tony, stating that he discovered Leigh died in childbirth due to inadequate medical care. The note also states that the child survived and was a girl. The implication is that both Tony and Jillian knew about Heaven long before she came to Farthinggale, but decided to let her grow up in poverty rather than face what they had done to Leigh. Saddened by what she has read, Annie puts the journal back in the drawer. She goes to Luke and they leave Farthinggale behind for good.

== Adaptation ==
On August 24, 2019, Lifetime aired an adaption of Web of Dreams starring Jennifer Laporte, Tim Donadt, Lizzie Boys, and Keenan Tracey, while Jason Priestley and Kelly Rutherford serve as executive producers.
