= Darkest Hour (Andrews novel) =

Novel by V. C. Andrews

- First edition cover of Darkest Hour
- Author: V. C. Andrews
- Language: English
- Series: Cutler series
- Genre: Gothic horror Family saga
- Publisher: Simon & Schuster
- Publication date: June 1993
- Publication place: United States
- Media type: Print
- Pages: 394
- ISBN: 0-671-75932-9
- Preceded by: Midnight Whispers 1992

Darkest Hour is the fifth and final novel in a series of books about the Cutler family attributed to V. C. Andrews and published in 1993. It is allegedly based on the original ideas of Andrews but was written by ghostwriter Andrew Neiderman. Andrews is the credited author.

The novel made The New York Times bestseller list for paperbacks in 1993.

== Plot summary ==
Darkest Hour is a prequel to Dawn. The last book in the Cutler series goes back in time to focus on Dawn's step-grandmother, Lillian.

This book is about Grandmother Cutler's childhood and adolescence. Most of the book takes place at the Booth plantation, "The Meadows". Lillian Booth is the middle daughter of an overbearing planter known as the Captain and a delicate Southern woman who lives in a dream world of sorts. Her older sister, Emily, is devoutly religious and often hostile to Lillian; her younger sister, Eugenia, is sick with cystic fibrosis (a factual oversight on the author's part is that CF was not technically named until 1938, by Dr. Dorothy Andersen, and the book appears to be set shortly before and during the Great Depression. Lillian's family could not have known Eugenia's disease by this name). One day after school, when Lillian is just five, Emily tells her that she is not her real sister and that Lillian's real parents died because she is a Jonah and everything she touches will die. Distraught, Lillian runs to their mother, only to find out that she is actually the daughter of her mother's younger sister Violet, whose young husband was tragically killed before Lillian's birth. Violet died during childbirth and Lillian was taken in by her aunt and uncle to be brought up as their own. Emily constantly brings up the theme of Lillian being a curse throughout the book: she locks her in the shed with a skunk, and murders Cotton, Eugenia and Lillian's kitten (though she makes this look like an accident). She even claims that Lillian's first period is a sign of her evil nature, due to her young age. Emily also blames Lillian for Eugenia's death, saying that Eugenia was born after Lillian brought Satan into the Meadows and that was how Eugenia became sick in the first place. Eugenia dies from smallpox due to being weakened from cystic fibrosis, a genetic disorder that is not understood at the time that the novel takes place. Therefore, when Lillian asks for Dawn to be renamed Eugenia many years later, it may be an attempt to get back the little sister she lost so early and loved so much. Lillian's mother is traumatized by the death of her youngest child and goes into a deep depression.

With her mother lost in depression, Lillian becomes increasingly isolated at home. Although she is growing into a young woman, her father makes no preparations for her coming out party or for her impending adulthood. When Emily sees Lillian and Niles Thompson, a boy from a neighbouring plantation, coming out of the woods on the way back from school, she uses this against Lillian to make sure she is placed under a sort of 'house arrest', not to go further than the house grounds. On the night of his twin sisters' big party, Niles climbs up to Lillian's bedroom window because Lillian was forbidden to go to the party. Although they dance and kiss, Lillian sends Niles home before things go too far. She goes to sleep happy but when she wakes up, she is told that Niles was found dead on the ground by her window. Emily blames her for Niles's death and Lillian accepts this guilt. With Niles dead, she has lost her last confidante.

As the Great Depression arrives, The Meadows begins to slip into debt. Emily blames Lillian for this. Not knowing how to restore The Meadows, Captain Booth begins to drink heavily and more often, which results in him falling down the stairs and breaking his leg. He tells Lillian that she must move into his quarters and take care of him until he is well. This ends in Lillian being repeatedly raped by her father while he is drunk. Lillian becomes pregnant at the age of 14. She is in her father's office reading up on pregnancy when the Captain catches her. She reveals that she is pregnant with his child. At this point, her father makes it seem as if Niles is the father of her child and puts Lillian in the hands of Emily, who sets out to cleanse Lillian's soul of Satan. The pregnant Lillian is locked away in her room, which has been stripped of all comforts, while the Captain tells everyone that his ailing wife is the pregnant one. About a month before Lillian gives birth, her mother passes away from cancer. Not wanting Lillian to give birth prematurely, the Captain and Emily tell Lillian she is no longer allowed to see her because it upsets her mother. Lillian later finds out that her mother had been dying of stomach cancer the entire time. The death is blamed on childbirth and her mother is buried right after Lillian gives birth to a baby girl, which she names Charlotte. Lillian is told not to refer to Charlotte as her baby, as Emily and the Captain have told everyone the baby is her sister. The Captain's only regret over the whole affair is that Charlotte is a girl and not the son he always longed for.

The Meadows continues to fail as a plantation. While trying to win money, Captain Booth loses the plantation to Bill Cutler, the owner of the luxury Cutler Hotel Resort near Virginia Beach. When Bill visits the plantation to see what he has won, he becomes very taken with Lillian, despite her disdainful treatment of him. Having seen that the plantation will make him no money, he tells the Captain that instead of the Meadows, he will take Lillian. After many tears, Lillian agrees to marry a man whom she does not love or even really like, thinking that at least she can leave The Meadows behind. Although she wants to take Charlotte with her, the Captain refuses, thinking that someone may find out Lillian is really her mother, so she has to leave her baby behind. Bill and Lillian marry and she becomes the new mistress of Cutler's Cove. Determined that no man will ever control her again, she gradually becomes the brains behind the management of the hotel, though Bill remains the public face. She also becomes pregnant and has a boy, Randolph. Despite Bill's complaints that he will grow up to be a "mama's boy", Lillian takes Randolph everywhere with her, letting him play in her office while she conducts her business negotiations. She goes back to visit the Meadows only a few times, as she finds it hard to deal with how dilapidated and dingy it has become, and also to see Charlotte growing up without really knowing her. The Captain dies soon after Randolph's birth, having gambled away nearly everything in drunken attempts to get back all the money he lost. Emily never changes. Lillian sends her money for Charlotte and the upkeep of the plantation but knows that there will never be enough. Despite the fact her husband has affairs and is never half the family man he promised to be, she is satisfied that nobody will take her son from her and that she is secure as the mistress of Cutler's Cove.
