= Darkest Hour =

Darkest Hour may refer to:

- "The Darkest Hour", a phrase used to describe the early period of World War II

== Film and television ==
- The Darkest Hour (1919 film), a film featuring Louis Wolheim
- The Darkest Hour (film), a 2011 science fiction film
- Darkest Hour (film), a 2017 film starring Gary Oldman as Winston Churchill
- "Darkest Hour" (NCIS: New Orleans), a 2015 television episode
- The Darkest Hour (Ninjago), a 2020 television episode

== Literature ==
- Darkest Hour (Andrews novel), a 1993 novel by V. C. Andrews
- Darkest Hour (Cabot novel), a 2001 novel by Meg Cabot
- The Darkest Hour (Hunter novel), a Warriors novel by Erin Hunter
- The Darkest Hour (Howell novel), a 2008 crime novel by Katherine Howell
- Spider-Man: The Darkest Hours, a novel by Jim Butcher

== Music ==
- Darkest Hour (band), an American death metal band
  - Darkest Hour (album), a 2014 album by Darkest Hour
- "Darkest Hours", a 2010 song by Stratovarius
- Darkest Hour, an EP by Charlotte Martin
- "Darkest Hour", a song by Arlo Guthrie from Amigo
- "Darkest Hour", a song by Eric Church released to help with Hurricane Helene relief
- "Darkest Hour", a song by Low Roar from ross.

== Video games ==
- Darkest Hour: Europe '44-'45, a 2008 modification of the computer game Red Orchestra: Ostfront 41-45
- Darkest Hour: A Hearts of Iron Game, a 2011 computer game

== See also ==
- The Dark Hour (disambiguation)
