= My Sweet Audrina =

1982 novel by V. C. Andrews

- First edition cover
- Author: V. C. Andrews
- Language: English
- Genre: Gothic horror
- Publisher: Pocket Books
- Publication date: 1982
- Publication place: United States
- Media type: Print (Paperback)
- Pages: 416 p.
- ISBN: 978-0-671-68286-6

My Sweet Audrina is a 1982 novel by V. C. Andrews. It was the only stand-alone novel published during Andrews' lifetime and was a number-one best-selling novel in North America. The story takes place in the Mid-Atlantic United States during the 1960s and 1970s. The story features diverse subjects, such as brittle bone disease, rape, post traumatic stress disorder and diabetes, in the haunting setting of a Victorian-era mansion near the fictitious River Lyle.

== Plot ==
Audrina Adare claims she is seven years old when the novel begins, although it is later revealed that her memory is unreliable. Audrina lives at Whitefern, a Victorian-era mansion, with her father Damian, her mother Lucietta, her aunt Ellsbeth and her cousin Vera. The family takes special care to keep Audrina unaware of precise dates, including that of her own birthday—even though Audrina knows that she was born on September 9, she is frequently confused about the exact passage of time, leading Vera to mock her for being insane. Audrina's father, however, is convinced that Audrina "walks in her own time space".

Nine years before Audrina was born, her elder sister—also named Audrina and also born on September 9—was raped and murdered in the woods on her ninth birthday. Damian tells her stories about his "first and best Audrina" and convinces the younger Audrina that, by a process of self-hypnosis (which includes going into the first Audrina's old bedroom and rocking in her rocking chair) she can gain all of her memories and become just as beloved and special as the original Audrina, which is what she wants more than anything else in the world.

Audrina lives in virtual isolation, her only real contact with the outside world being her older cousin, Vera, who despises her. Vera claims that Audrina stole her place in Damian's affection and that the "second and worst" Audrina will never be as special as the first and best. Vera, a habitual liar and borderline nymphomaniac, proves early on that she will stop at nothing to steal and destroy everything that Audrina loves. Audrina, conversely, is haunted by dreams of her dead sister's rape and is terrified of sex. Vera has very brittle bones that break easily, and she enjoys playing the convalescent to get Damien's attention or sympathy. She takes great pleasure in taunting Audrina and often claims that she is more loved by Damien than Audrina is.

When she is aged seven, Audrina meets Arden Lowe and his mother Billie, a former ice skater who is now a double amputee. Billie and Arden have moved into the groundkeeper's cottage in the woods where the first Audrina died. Although she fears the woods, Audrina is willing to brave them to see Billie and Arden, and gradually, Damian consents to these visits. Meanwhile, Lucietta is pregnant again. The family calls Mrs. Allismore, a psychic, to come and predict the baby's gender. They are horrified when she predicts the child is neither male nor female, although Vera calmly states that it is fitting that a new "freak" would join the family. On Audrina's ninth birthday, Lucietta goes into early labor and dies in childbirth. The baby is a girl named Sylvia.

Lucietta was a great pianist, so to keep her memory alive Audrina takes piano lessons with Vera at the home of Lamar Rensdale. More than two years after her birth, Sylvia finally comes home from the hospital, and it is revealed that she is mentally challenged. Audrina is told by her father to take care of Sylvia. Audrina complains to her piano teacher about not being allowed to go to school; he intervenes and she is finally allowed to attend, with Ellsbeth begrudgingly agreeing to care for Sylvia.

A few years later, Audrina discovers that Lamar and Vera are intimately involved, and Vera is pregnant. When Vera finds out that Audrina knows about the affair, she angrily confronts and fights with her, resulting in Vera suffering a miscarriage. The next day, Vera leaves town with Lamar, leaving a note claiming that she is actually Audrina's paternal half-sister due to an affair between Ellsbeth and Damian before he met Lucietta. Damian does not deny it and is relieved that Vera has left. Audrina is upset he acted so badly towards his own daughter, but Damian says Vera hates them all and would destroy them, given the chance. Ellsbeth agrees.

Shortly after she turns eighteen, Audrina discovers that Damian and Ellsbeth are lovers again. However, Ellsbeth threatens to leave Damian because he will not let her help Vera, who is alone after Lamar committed suicide. She and Damian seem to have resolved things, but the next morning, Ellsbeth is found dead from a mysterious fall down the stairs. In the confusion following this death, Audrina elopes with Arden, hoping to escape her controlling father, and takes Sylvia with her. Because she is not prepared for sexual intimacy, however, her wedding night is disastrous.

When the newlyweds return from their honeymoon, they find that Damian has won over Arden's mother and invited her to live with them at Whitefern. He offers Arden a job at his company since Arden was unable to find work. Audrina is upset at how Damian manipulates events to keep control over her life, and disappointed that Billie has been tricked into believing he is wonderful and kind. She wants Billie and Arden to be happy, however, so she tries to live peacefully with everyone. Things seem okay until Vera returns. Damian orders her to leave, but Billie is heart-broken by his cold-heartedness and convinces him to let Vera stay. Soon after, Vera tries to seduce Arden.

Later, Audrina (and later Vera) discovers that Billie and Damian have become lovers. Audrina is disgusted and attempts to persuade Billie to leave, saying her father only knows how to ruin the lives of the women he loves. Billie says her father has made her feel like a woman again, and Audrina comes to accept their relationship. Later, however, Billie (like Ellsbeth) falls down the stairs and dies. Audrina suspects Sylvia might have pushed Billie, as she always liked and wanted a cart that Billie used to get around, but protects Sylvia from accusations by others.

Depressed and disillusioned, Audrina pulls away from Arden and Sylvia. Vera renews her attempts to seduce Arden, and they become involved. At first, Audrina does not care. However, her love and sexuality finally awaken, and she tells Arden that she does not want to lose him to Vera after losing so many other things. They spend the first happy night of their marriage together. When she awakens at night to check on Sylvia, she goes into the first Audrina's room, and for the first time in many years, sits in the rocking chair. She has some clear visions of the day the first Audrina died, which include Arden being present in the woods and running away.

Confused and upset, she returns to her bedroom to confront Arden, but is pushed down the stairs by an unseen assailant. She survives but falls into a coma, during which she can hear and see others but cannot speak or move herself; she overhears that Vera and Arden are lovers again, with Vera trying to convince Arden to disconnect her life support. With Sylvia's help, Audrina awakens and escapes Vera. Her near-death experience convinces her that she cannot die without learning the secret of the first Audrina.

Audrina is angry with Arden and wants Vera out of the house. She confronts Damian and demands he tell her the truth about her older sister's death. Damian relents, confessing that the first Audrina never existed: it was Audrina herself who was gang-raped in the woods. Her father had always told her she was pure and good, and the rape left her so traumatized that she attempted suicide.

In an effort to save Audrina from herself, Damian subjected her to electro-convulsive therapy, trying to erase her memory of the rape. Seeing his daughter endure the treatment was too much for Damian, so he had the family try to convince Audrina that she was two years younger than she really was and that the rape had been committed not against her, but against an older sister who died before she was born. Eventually, the repetition of this story worked and Audrina believed it, explaining her unreliable memory. Since the family deliberately changed the clocks in the house and ripped off calendar days at random, her sense of time was altered. As Audrina listens to Damian's explanation, she realizes Arden witnessed the rape but ran away, fearing Audrina's older and stronger assailants; Arden knew who she really was all along but kept the secret.

As Damian relays the truth to Audrina, Vera appears in the doorway. Upon seeing Vera, Audrina is flooded with clear memories of the attack and realizes that Vera was the only other person who knew of her path home through the woods that day; Vera told the assailants where to find her. She accuses Vera of acting out of jealousy. Vera denies being involved, but Damian believes Audrina and lashes out at Vera. Vera's reaction suggests she is guilty, but when Damian curses her, she accuses him of never acknowledging her as his daughter and favoring Audrina over her. She tells Damian that it is his own fault Audrina was raped. Infuriated, Damian rushes at her. When Vera turns to run, she slips and falls down the stairs, later dying from her injuries.

Heartbroken and betrayed, Audrina decides to take Sylvia and leave Whitefern; she is convinced that nothing can flourish in the house but tragedy. She is willing to leave Damian and Arden behind if it means escaping her past and the fate of her mother and Vera. Audrina says her final good-byes, but Sylvia refuses to leave. Her sister's simple words of "home, Audrina, home" end Audrina's desire to take Sylvia away. She tries to leave by herself but decides to stay and replace the painful memories with new ones that will be based on honesty and love. Audrina finally feels like she has become the "first" Audrina she always strived to be.

== Characters ==
Audrina Adelle Adare: Narrator of the story. Daughter of Damian and Lucietta; sister of Sylvia; cousin and half-sister of Vera; in love with Arden. She is unable to remember the first seven years of her life but has psychic visions of her dead sister's life. She is described as sensitive and very beautiful, with violet eyes and long "chameleon" (dirty blonde) hair. Her birthday is September 9, making her a Virgo.

Damian Jonathan Adare: Father of Vera, Audrina and Sylvia; husband of Lucietta; brother-in-law of Ellsbeth. He is mysterious, tall, dark and handsome, a ruthless businessman and overprotective father. He hates Vera, loves Audrina and is ambivalent towards Sylvia. He fears growing old or losing his power. Women love him. Men want to be him.

Lucietta Lana Whitefern Adare: Mother of Audrina and Sylvia; wife of Damian; younger sister of Ellsbeth. Her nickname is Lucky. She is a gifted pianist who gave up a career to marry Damian. She has a heart condition, making her pregnancy with Sylvia one of high risk. She sometimes overindulges in chocolate, bourbon and flirting but means well.

Sylvia Adare: Youngest daughter of Damian and Lucietta; sister of Audrina; half-sister and cousin of Vera. She is born prematurely and mentally disabled. Audrina is the only person who is able to successfully communicate with her. She is described as being very beautiful, with long "chestnut" (brown) hair and aquamarine eyes.

Ellsbeth Whitefern: Mother of Vera; older sister of Lucietta; aunt of Audrina and Sylvia. Her nickname is Ellie. A former schoolteacher, she used to date Damian but he dumped her when she became pregnant with Vera, not believing he was the father, and married Lucietta.

Vera Adare: Daughter of Ellsbeth and Damian; cousin and half-sister of Audrina and Sylvia; lover of Lamar. Vera is described contrarily as conniving and mean yet delicate and vulnerable to injuries. She has osteogenesis imperfecta (brittle bone disease). She has long "apricot" (red) hair, pale skin and dark eyes. She is Audrina's rival, first for Damian's attention, then Arden's. Her birthday is November 12, making her a Scorpio.

Mrs. Allismore: A "psychic" hired, then fired, by Damian.

Aunt Mercy Marie: Missing and presumed dead, she was Lucietta and Ellsbeth's distant relative, rumoured to have been eaten by cannibals on her travels. Lucietta and Ellsbeth get drunk and "channel" her spirit during their weekly Tuesday Teatimes to insult one another by holding a photo of Mercy Marie to their faces and mock each other through the dead spirit. Audrina is not sure if they are joking or not.

Arden Nelson Lowe: Only son of Billie Lowe; in love with Audrina. He wants to become an architect but ends up working for Damian. He has dark brown hair and amber eyes and is buff. He is a noble but gullible man who lets Audrina down when she needs him most. Therefore, he must ultimately win her back.

Billie Lowe: Mother of Arden. She resembles Elizabeth Taylor. She was an Olympic figure skating champion who lost both of her legs after getting gangrene as a complication from untreated diabetes. She is a friendly, positive person to be around. She becomes a mother figure to Audrina.

Lamar Rensdale: Audrina's and Vera's piano teacher. He helps Audrina by convincing her aunt to allow her to go to school. Unfortunately, he becomes involved in an affair with underage Vera, resulting in an unwanted pregnancy.

== Trivia ==
- The Norwegian band Ancient recorded a song called "Audrina, My Sweet" on their album Proxima Centauri in tribute to the book.
- V. C. Andrews drew inspiration for Vera's injuries and the four falls down the stairs from her own fall down a school staircase and subsequent health problems.
- The book can be seen in a 1989 Polaroid photograph laying next to two unidentified people bound and gagged; some have connected the photograph to the disappearance of Tara Calico.
- Sydney band Toys Went Berserk wrote and recorded their first song Audrina in 1986 for their debut album Pieces, a double 12" vinyl recorded and mixed in late 1986 and released in May 1987.

== Adaptations ==
- In late 2015, it was announced My Sweet Audrina would be adapted into a Lifetime film, starring India Eisley, William Moseley and Seth Isaac Johnson. It aired on January 9, 2016.

== Sequel ==
- In an October 2015 interview, Andrew Neiderman (the ghostwriter) announced that he was writing a sequel to My Sweet Audrina, titled Whitefern. This was met with a mostly unfavorable reaction from V. C. Andrews' core fans. The sequel was released by Pocket Books July 26, 2016.
