= Chris McNally (actor) =

Canadian actor (born 1988)

- Born: Christopher McNally; November 8, 1988 (age 37); Scarborough, Ontario, Canada
- Occupation: Actor
- Years active: 2005–present
- Spouse: Julie Gonzalo (m. 2018)
- Children: 2

Christopher McNally (born November 8, 1988) is a Canadian-born actor most noted for his role as Lucas Bouchard in the Hallmark Channel series When Calls the Heart (2019–present).

== Personal life ==
As of 2018, McNally was splitting his time between Los Angeles and Vancouver. In 2017, he met actress Julie Gonzalo when they worked together on the TV movie The Sweetest Heart. They got married in 2018, and had their first child in June 2022. In December 2025, the couple announced that they were expecting their second child. In June 2026, they welcomed their second child.

== Career ==
McNally's film career began with his award-winning portrayal of John Jardine in 2013's John Apple Jack. In 2017 he appeared in Freefall.

Episodic television work includes appearances in The CW's Supernatural and TNT's original series Falling Skies. He appeared in several episodes of the NetFlix original series Altered Carbon (2018). He became a TV series regular with his portrayal of character Lucas Bouchard starting in early 2019 in the Hallmark Channel's popular series When Calls the Heart.

In mid-2019, McNally portrayed Cal Dennison in the Lifetime Network TV movie adaptation of VC Andrews' novel, Heaven.

McNally is an actor and writer. He is a member of the Hallmark stable of wholesome talent, with appearances in several holiday productions distributed by Hallmark Movies & Mysteries, such as Hearts of Christmas (2016); Rocky Mountain Christmas (2017); The Sweetest Heart (2018); and A Winter Princess (2019).

== Work ==
=== Filmography ===
- 2008 - Another Cinderella Story: Fan at the Competition (uncredited)
- 2010 - The Plastic Protocol: Sebastian St. Paul
- 2013 - John Apple Jack: John Jardine
- 2016 - The Orchard: Andy Cunningham
- 2017 - Freefall: Lucas
- 2026 - A Safe Distance: Joey

=== TV ===
- Holiday Crashers; 2024 Hallmark made-for-TV movie; Justin
- Tipline Mysteries: Dial 1 for Murder; 2024 Hallmark made-for-TV movie; Beeks
- 3 Beds, 2 Baths, 1 Ghost; 2023 Hallmark made-for-TV movie; Elliot Barnes
- Christmas Class Reunion; 2022; Hallmark made-for-TV movie; Buttons the Elf (cameo)
- A Tail of Love; 2022 Hallmark made-for-TV movie; JR Stockard
- Riverdale (2017 TV series); 2021; Alan Mayberry; 1 episode
- Snowkissed; 2021 Hallmark made-for-TV movie; Noah
- V.C. Andrew's Heaven; 2019; Cal Dennison
- Sailing Into Love; 2019 Hallmark made-for-TV movie; Tom
- When Calls the Heart 2019 – present; Lucas Bouchard – main character
- A Winter Princess; 2019; Hallmark made-for-TV movie; Jesse
- The Sweetest Heart; 2018 Hallmark made-for-TV movie; Nate
- Altered Carbon (2018); Sergei Brevlov; 3 episodes
- Same Time Next Week; 2017 Hallmark made-for-TV movie; Teddy
- Eat, Drink, & Be Buried: A Gourmet Detective Mystery; (2017); Douglas Weston
- Rocky Mountain Christmas; 2017; Hallmark made-for-TV movie; Cody McKinney
- Hearts of Christmas; 2016; Hallmark made-for-TV movie; Conner
- Dead of Summer; 2016; Hipster Guy
- Falling Skies; 2015; Ryan; 1 episode
- Supernatural 2009–2015; Unnamed Busboy (episode "Death Takes a Holiday", 2009) and Ty (episode "Inside Man", 2015)
- Untold Stories of the E.R. 2012; Dave
- Tower Prep 2010; West Campus Security Monitor #1
- Killer Instinct 2005; Ice Cream Clerk

== Awards ==
McNally received the 2014 award for Best Actor in a Feature Film at FilmOut San Diego for John Apple Jack.
