= The Dark Hour =

The Dark Hour may refer to:

- The Dark Hour (1936 film), an American film directed by Charles Lamont
- The Dark Hour (2006 film), a Spanish science fiction film written and directed by Elio Quiroga
- The Dark Hours, a Canadian horror film directed by Paul Fox

== See also ==
- Darkest Hour (disambiguation)
