= Christopher's Diary: Secret Brother =

2015 novel written by V. C. Andrews

- First edition
- Author: V. C. Andrews
- Language: English
- Series: Dollanganger series spinoff
- Genre: Gothic horror Family saga
- Publisher: Pocket Books (paperback); Simon & Schuster (hard cover)
- Publication date: 2015
- Publication place: United States
- Media type: Print
- Preceded by: Christopher's Diary: Echoes of Dollanganger (2014)

Secret Brother is a 2015 gothic novel accredited to V.C. Andrews published by Pocket Books in paperback and by Simon & Schuster in hardback. The book is the sequel to Christopher's Diary: Echoes of Dollanganger.

== Plot summary ==
A young boy suffers amnesia from a trauma he suffered in what feels like must have been another life. He’s adopted into a wealthy family—but what will happen when he learns the truth about his past?
