= Embrace of the Vampire (2013 film) =

- Directed by: Carl Bessai
- Written by: Andrew C. Erin; Alan Mruvka; Sheldon Roper
- Produced by: John Prince; Alan Mruvka; Lisa M. Hansen; Lati Grobman; Christa Campbell; Tom Berry
- Starring: Sharon Hinnendael; Kaniehtiio Horn; C.C. Sheffield; Chelsey Reist; Victor Webster; Keegan Connor Tracy
- Music by: John Frizzell
- Production companies: CineTel Films; Bloodline Pictures
- Distributed by: Anchor Bay Entertainment
- Release date: October 15, 2013 (United States)
- Running time: 91 minutes
- Country: Canada
- Language: English

Embrace of the Vampire is a 2013 erotic horror direct-to-video film directed by Carl Bessai and written by Andrew C. Erin, Alan Mruvka, and Sheldon Roper. It is a loose remake of the 1995 film of the same name. The film was released on video in the United States on October 15, 2013.

== Plot ==
The virgin and repressed Charlotte Hawthorn joins the university from a Catholic school with a scholarship for participating in the fencing team. She shares the room with Nicole and tells her that her mother died and she is alone. Charlotte has thalassemia and is forced to use medicine. She gets a job working as a waitress in a coffee shop owned by Chris. Soon she meets the fencing coach, Professor Cole, who is also responsible for the literature classes, and her mate Eliza becomes jealous over his treatment of Charlotte. Soon she has daydreams and the mystic Daciana, who is the owner of a store, explains her fate in the world as a vampire hunter, but Charlotte does not believe in her until her friends die. She begins having erotic and gruesome dreams.

== Cast ==
- Sharon Hinnendael as Charlotte Hawthorn
- Tiio Horn as Nicole
- C.C. Sheffield as Eliza
- Chelsea Marie Reist as Sarah Campbell
- Victor Webster as Professor Cole / Stefan
- Robert Moloney as Dr. John Duncan
- Ryan Kennedy as Chris
- Keegan Connor Tracy as Daciana
- Olivia Cheng as Kelly
- Claire Smithies as Sorina
- Sarah Grey as Young Charlotte

== Reception ==
The film has a critic aggregate score of 10% on Rotten Tomatoes. DVD Talk said, "If you're into gory lesbian vampire movies with lots of female nudity, you'll enjoy this. It offers all of that, wraps up it with a serviceable plot line and some style, and delivers exactly what you expect it to, no more, no less." Bloody Disgusting said the film "is a loose remake of the original, but while the 1995 film had melodramatic allure, this one is painfully boring. It would’ve benefited greatly from introducing Charlotte’s slaying family tradition earlier in the movie, rather than its final minutes. Ultimately, it’s an easily forgettable remake." PopMatters in its review said, "Certainly Embrace of the Vampire isn’t nearly as bad as it could have been, but it’s hardly an evening at the ballet, either."
