= Dawn (Andrews novel) =

Novel by V. C. Andrews

- First edition cover of Dawn
- Author: V. C. Andrews
- Language: English
- Series: Cutler series
- Genre: Gothic horror Family saga
- Publisher: Simon & Schuster
- Publication date: November 1990
- Publication place: United States
- Media type: Print
- Pages: 407
- ISBN: 0-671-67068-9
- Followed by: Secrets of the Morning (1991)

Dawn was a 1990 novel started by V. C. Andrews and finished by Andrew Neiderman after her death. It is the first of five books in the Cutler series.

== Plot summary ==
14-year-old Dawn Longchamp leads a humble, rootless existence with her parents, Ormond and Sally Jean Longchamp, and her moody older brother Jimmy, who is 16 years old. Moving around a lot, Dawn's family does not provide much stability for her, but what her lifestyle lacks in stability, her home life makes up for in love.

This erratic lifestyle seems to change when Dawn and Jimmy are able to enroll in an exclusive private school when Ormond gets a job there. It is here that Dawn's talent for singing is discovered. Her brother does not enjoy the school, feeling the weight of class differences bear down upon him. Dawn, although optimistic, does not fare much better, and is sternly ordered by the headmistress to be on her best behavior as she is of lesser social status than her classroom peers.

On her first day, she also incurs the wrath of the most popular and affluent girl in the school, Clara Sue Cutler, after accidentally ratting her out on her smoking. Clara Sue then proceeds to pull mean-spirited pranks on Dawn and openly refers to her as white trash. Deeply offended, Dawn finally stops trying to like Clara Sue after this insult. However, Clara Sue's older brother, the handsome and charming Philip Cutler, does not share his sister's loathing.

Phillip is kind to Dawn, and immediately shows an interest in her. He compares her beauty to that of his mother, Laura Sue Cutler, and is easily entranced. Jimmy is wary of Phillip, but does not overtly oppose Dawn's involvement with him. A shy girl who has had a sheltered upbringing, Dawn is somewhat taken aback by Phillip's immediate romantic overtures, even though she does find him attractive. Phillip urges her to date him, and after constant persuasion from him, Dawn agrees. Meanwhile, Dawn's mother, Sally Jean, has discovered that she is pregnant. This strains the Longchamps' finances, which are already tight, but Dawn is still overjoyed at the prospect of a little sibling, hoping that the baby will look more like her. Sally Jean gives birth to a little girl named Fern, but does not recover her health after the labor. She attempts several holistic ways of recovering her health but to no avail. She remains bedridden for the duration of Dawn's school year.

At school, Dawn is excited by the musical opportunities now opening up to her. Her enjoyment of music culminates in her solo song, "Over the Rainbow", at a school concert. Although nervous because of a prank pulled earlier by Clara Sue and her clique, Dawn draws emotional strength from the pearl necklace Sally Jean gave her earlier in the evening, which she claims are a Longchamp heirloom.

Dawn's world comes crashing down after her solo performance at the school concert. Her beloved mother, Sally Jean, passes away that night. With the shock of this barely registered, what comes on the heels of Sally Jean's death truly changes Dawn's life forever. A security guard at the hospital where Sally Jean died recognizes the family, and also notices something peculiar in Dawn's appearance. He goes to the authorities, who perform an early morning raid of the Longchamp residence. Through these officers, it is revealed to Dawn that she is not Ormond and Sally Jean's biological daughter, but that she was kidnapped by them as a newborn baby, and that she is actually the daughter of Randolph and Laura Sue Cutler.

Dawn is taken back to Cutler's Cove, Virginia, an offshoot of Virginia Beach. Ormond is arrested for child kidnapping. With no nearby relatives to come to their aid, Jimmy and Fern are placed in foster care. Dawn refuses to believe that Ormond kidnapped her, but the authorities prove her identity through a unique birthmark she shares with the description of the kidnapped baby. Dawn is appalled at the realization that the terrible Clara Sue is her sister; even worse, her boyfriend, Phillip, is actually her brother.

These concerns fade into the background after her first meeting with Grandmother Cutler at the family's hotel, also named Cutler's Cove. Grandmother Cutler does not seem overjoyed about the return of her long-lost grandchild. She informs Dawn that she will be known by her "true" name, Eugenia, and that she will work in the hotel as a maid in order to prove that she is trustworthy. Dawn is shocked and upset by this cold treatment. She tries appealing to her real parents, Randolph and Laura Sue, but they are just as powerless as her. Randolph, though charming and handsome, has little willpower and prefers life to be as smooth as possible. Laura Sue is enchanted by Dawn's prettiness and resemblance to her, but refuses to make any effort to help her, as she is completely cowed by her mother-in-law. Dawn is also put at risk by Clara Sue's malicious tricks.

Infuriated by Dawn's return, she does her best to make sure Dawn is fired by stealing jewellery and other items from the hotel guests. Dawn finds some comfort in the housekeeper, Mrs. Boston, who knew Sally Jean and Ormond Longchamp when they worked at the hotel. She cannot believe that her parents stole her, as they were always honest, hard-working people. Mrs. Boston hints that there is more to the "kidnapping" than meets the eye. Dawn's life is further brightened by a secret visit from Jimmy, aided and abetted by Phillip. Jimmy confesses that he has been in love with Dawn since they were children, but never dared show it because he felt he was sick for thinking of her that way. Dawn admits the attraction is mutual, but they find it hard to overcome their upbringing as brother and sister.

This happy interlude comes to an end when Clara Sue finds Jimmy in the basement, where Dawn hid him. She tells Grandmother Cutler, who goes to the police and has Jimmy taken back to his foster parents. Dawn is heart-broken that Jimmy has to leave and is furious with Clara Sue. Jealous of her obvious affection for Jimmy, Phillip corners Dawn in her bathroom and rapes her. Desperate to get out, Dawn visits Mrs. Dalton, the woman who took care of her just after she was born, and learns that her "kidnapping" was staged by Grandmother Cutler because she is not Randolph's biological daughter but a product of one of her mother's extramarital affairs. Grandmother Cutler did not want a non-Cutler child to grow up as part of the family, so she paid the Longchamps with family jewels, including the string of pearls, to keep them quiet and to provide for Dawn's future. Outraged, Dawn confronts Grandmother Cutler about this.

The old woman eventually admits that she was behind the "kidnapping" and offers Dawn a deal: if Dawn will study singing in New York, Grandmother Cutler will use her influence to have Ormond released from prison. Dawn agrees but on one condition: that she be referred to by Dawn, not Eugenia. The book ends with Dawn going to New York.

== Characters ==
- Dawn Longchamp (AKA Eugenia Grace Cutler): The main character of the series. She is described as a bright girl with a gift in singing. She believed Ormand and Sally Jean to be her parents, but is really a member of the prestigious Cutler family. She has dreams of becoming a singer. Originally a shy and innocent girl, she becomes stronger and more assertive due to the events of the novel and the book ends with her flying to New York to study singing.
- James "Jimmy" Longchamp: Dawn's adoptive older brother and the son of Ormand and Sally Jean, and older brother of Fern. He is described a hot-tempered and stubborn, but he does have a hidden softer side. He has loved Dawn ever since childhood, but never admitted this due to their upbringing as siblings.
- Ormand Longchamp: Husband of Sally Jean and father of Jimmy and Fern, adoptive father of Dawn. He is sent to jail for "kidnapping" Dawn for a short time, but is soon vindicated with Dawn's help
- Sally Jean Longchamp: Wife of Ormand and mother of Jimmy and Fern. She is Dawn's confidant and loves all her children dearly. She dies of tuberculosis soon after Fern's birth.
- Phillip Cutler: The older brother of Dawn and Clara Sue, and son of Randolph and Laura Sue. He falls in love with Dawn and becomes obsessed with her even after learning they are brother and sister. Although he seems to be the one family member willing to help her, even helping Jimmy to come and see her after they are separated, his obsession and jealousy eventually lead him to rape her.
- Clara Sue Cutler: The younger sister of Phillip and Dawn. At first she hates Dawn for being prettier and more talented, even though she is "white trash"; after the revelation that they are related, she hates her even more, because she has spent her whole life feeling like she is a replacement for the kidnapped "Eugenia". She is very rebellious and spoiled.
- Lillian Cutler: The antagonist of the series. She is the grandmother of Dawn, Phillip, and Clara Sue, and mother of Randolph. After meeting her for the first time, Dawn thinks Lillian would have preferred her to be dead rather than brought back to the hotel. Lillian seems to deeply resent Dawn's presence, insisting that she work as a maid to prove she is not a 'thief' like her adoptive parents, and that Dawn answer to the name 'Eugenia' (the name of Lillian's beloved little sister, who died young). It is eventually revealed that Lillian was the one who arranged the kidnapping. She claims that this is because Dawn is the product of an affair between Laura Sue and a travelling musician, and she did not want Dawn growing up with the benefits of being a Cutler when she was actually 'a cuckoo in the nest'. She agrees to use her influence to get Ormand out of prison as long as Dawn will go to New York.
- Randolph Cutler: Father of Dawn, Phillip, and Clara Sue; husband of Laura Sue; son of Lillian and William. An old-fashioned 'mama's boy', but handsome and charming. Randolph is the only family member who seems happy to have Dawn back, but he is so dependent on Lillian that he cannot stand up to her about her treatment of Dawn. Eventually, Dawn finds out he is not her biological father, but his mother kept him in ignorance of this and her involvement in Dawn's "kidnapping" to protect him. As Dawn has become fond of Randolph, she never tells him the truth.
- Laura Sue Cutler: Mother of Dawn, Phillip, and Clara Sue; wife of Randolph. She is very beautiful, but refuses to take any responsibility for the hotel or even her children. She has little influence over her husband and Dawn ends up feeling like she is the adult in the relationship. When Dawn confronts her about being the product of an affair, she seems upset but does not disagree.
- William Cutler: Husband of Lillian and father of Randolph. The original owner of Cutler Cove Hotel. He died prior to the story's beginning.
- Ms. Mary Boston: Maid of the hotel. She becomes a close friend of Dawn's throughout the story.

== Adaptation ==
Lifetime produced an adaptation of Dawn and the rest of the Cutler family series for 2023 release. Brec Bassinger stars as Dawn and Donna Mills as Lillian Cutler. Also in the cast is Fran Drescher, Joey McIntyre, Jesse Metcalfe, Khobe Clarke, Jason Cermak, Miranda Frigon, Elyse Maloway, and Dane Schioler.
