= Christopher's Diary: Echoes of Dollanganger =

2015 novel by V. C. Andrews

Christopher's Diary: Secrets of Foxworth
- First edition (publ. Gallery Books)
- Author: V. C. Andrews
- Language: English
- Series: Dollanganger series spinoff
- Genre: Gothic horror Family saga
- Publisher: Gallery Books
- Publication date: 2015
- Publication place: United States
- Media type: Print
- Preceded by: Garden of Shadows; Christopher's Diary: Secrets of Foxworth (2014)
- Followed by: Christopher's Diary: Secret Brother (2015)

Christopher's Diary: Echoes of Dollanganger is a 2015 gothic fiction novel by V.C. Andrews based on her Dollanganger series. It is the second installment of a set of novels that are spin-offs to the Dollanganger Saga. It is a sequel to Christopher's Diary: Secrets of Foxworth.

== Plot ==
The story is set after the last book in the Dollanganger series Garden of Shadows and Christopher's Diary: Secrets of Foxworth. The father of 17-year-old Kristin Masterwood has been hired to renovate Foxworth Hall after it was abandoned after Seeds of Yesterday. While accompanying him during the renovation, she discovers the remains of Christopher Dollanganger's diary which records, in detail, the events of his and his siblings' captivity in the attic (first covered in the book Flowers in the Attic). Kristen and her boyfriend then go on to re-enact these events, and more secrets from the previous books are revealed. They find out more about the family and the person rebuilding Foxworth Hall.

== Summary ==
Kristin Masterwood's mother was related to the Foxworth family and died during Kristin's childhood. Kristin currently possesses Christopher's diary, which details the history of the abandoned estate, the relationship between Christopher and his sister Cathy, and information about the family.

== Sequel ==
The book is directly succeeded by Christopher's Diary: Secret Brother.
