= Petals on the Wind =

Novel by V. C. Andrews

- Mass Market Paperback edition cover
- Author: V. C. Andrews
- Language: English
- Series: Dollanganger series
- Genre: Gothic horror Family saga
- Publisher: Simon & Schuster
- Publication date: 1980
- Publication place: United States
- Media type: Print
- Pages: 448
- ISBN: 0-671-72947-0 (1990 reissues)
- OCLC: 28589928
- Preceded by: Flowers in the Attic (1979)
- Followed by: If There Be Thorns (1981)

Petals on the Wind is a novel written by V. C. Andrews in 1980. It is the second book in the Dollanganger series. The timeline takes place from the siblings' successful escape in November 1960 to the fall of 1975. The book, like the others in the series, was a number one best-seller in North America in the early 1980s. In 2014, it was adapted into a Lifetime original movie.

== Plot ==
Immediately after the events of Flowers in the Attic, Cathy, Chris and Carrie travel to Florida after escaping Foxworth Hall. Still weak from the effects of the poison that killed her twin brother Cory, Carrie gets sick on the bus. When they reach Clairmont, South Carolina, Henrietta "Henny" Beech, a mute African-American woman, rescues the children and takes them to the home of her employer, 40-year-old widower Dr. Paul Sheffield. At first the children refuse to reveal their identities, but once Cathy is convinced that Paul genuinely cares and might be able to help them, she tells him their story.

During the siblings' first Christmas with Paul, Cathy begins bleeding profusely during a ballet audition and collapses; after waking in the hospital, she is told that they had to perform a D&C and that the bleeding was due to irregular periods (due to her near-starvation in the attic). Cathy suspects that the bleeding was actually a miscarriage, the result of her sexual relationship with her brother Chris; however, she does not mention this suspicion, telling herself that it is in the past and all that matters is her ability to dance.

Though the children thrive under Paul and Henny's care and start fulfilling their dreams (Chris heads to college and then medical school; Cathy gets into a local ballet school and then one in New York City), Cathy is still bent on revenge against their mother Corrine, knowing she is to blame for everything wrong in their lives. Carrie continues to feel anguish over Cory's death and is embarrassed by her failure to grow properly, while Cathy and Chris still struggle with their feelings for each other. Determined to live a "normal" life, Cathy rejects Chris's advances and insists that he must find someone else to love.

Over time, Cathy falls in love with Paul and they plan to marry, to Chris's dismay. Paul tells Cathy the story of his wife, Julia, and how she had drowned herself and their son, Scotty, after Paul confessed to an affair. Cathy and Paul become engaged. Her ballet troupe begins performing in New York. She finishes a performance to find Paul's sister, Amanda, waiting to meet her. Amanda leads Cathy to believe that Julia is still alive and states that she knows Cathy miscarried Chris's child. Devastated, Cathy runs to a man in her dance troupe, Julian Marquet, who had been pursuing her since the day they met, and agrees to marry him immediately.

When she returns to South Carolina, it is as Mrs. Julian Marquet. Only then does Cathy confront Paul about Amanda's message—and learns that Julia had been in a permanent vegetative state from her suicide attempt at the time Paul took them in, but she died around the time Cathy and Paul became intimate. Paul also insists that Cathy did not have a miscarriage. Cathy still is not sure but realizes that she has now revealed to Paul that Chris assaulted her during their captivity. Paul assures Cathy that he loves her; Cathy knows she has made a mistake in marrying Julian, but she feels she must honor her vows.

Julian is a possessive husband and jealous of Cathy's relationships with Paul and Chris. He abuses Cathy, cheats on her and forbids her from seeing them. He also breaks Cathy's toes so that she cannot perform. Chris pleads with Cathy to leave Julian, but Cathy has found out she is pregnant and tells Chris that she loves her husband and wants to make their marriage work, despite Paul's and Chris's insistence that she must leave for her own safety. Julian has a car accident and is paralyzed, at least temporarily. He believes he will never dance again and dies by suicide in the hospital.

After Cathy gives birth to her son, Julian Janus "Jory" Marquet, she becomes more determined to destroy her own mother's life. She packs up Carrie and Jory and they move to Virginia, not far from Foxworth Hall. Under the guise of collecting Julian's insurance, she hires Bart Winslow, her mother's second husband, as her lawyer. Meanwhile, Carrie meets a young man named Alex and enjoys a sweet courtship, until he says he plans to be a minister. Frightened by the memory of her abusive grandmother's religious rants, Carrie purchases powdered doughnuts and arsenic and attempts suicide.

In the hospital, Cathy reassures Carrie that Alex won't be a minister if it upsets her so much. Carrie reveals her other motive for suicide: she saw their mother on the street, ran up to her and was angrily rejected. This only strengthens Carrie's conviction that she herself must be evil and undeserving. Carrie dies, and Cathy becomes even more intent on taking revenge on Corrine. She soon comes up with a plan to blackmail her mother along with stealing her handsome young husband, Bart.

Cathy continues her obsessive quest, even after Chris discovers Cathy's plan and threatens to distance himself from Cathy completely. Though initially focused solely on revenge, Cathy falls in love with Bart, and he returns her affections. She discovers she is pregnant and believes this will be a crushing blow to Corrine. Bart is torn between his desire to stay married to Corrine and his wish to be a father but does manage to put an end to Cathy sending blackmail letters to Corrine.

Cathy returns to Foxworth Hall on the eve of the annual Christmas Ball, in a replica of the gown Corrine wore to a Christmas party Cathy and Chris spied on many years previously. She visits the room where she and her siblings were locked away and sees that it has been untouched since their escape. At the stroke of midnight, she appears in the ballroom and exposes the truth to Bart and the party guests. Bart takes Cathy and Corrine to the library, where the grandmother is seated.

At first, Bart believes Cathy is lying, but after hearing Cathy's whole story, he confronts Corrine. Corrine breaks down, claiming to be the real victim because her father had known his grandchildren were hidden in his home, and he wanted them to die in captivity. She claims she gave the children arsenic to make them sick gradually so she could sneak them out to safety one by one and then tell her parents the children had died in hospital. Corrine says she stashed the body in a ravine, but Cathy accuses her of hiding it in a small room off the attic that gave off a telltale odor. Chris bursts into the library, and Corrine perceives him as the ghost of his father, her first husband. She suffers a mental breakdown and sets fire to Foxworth Hall. Corrine, Chris, and Cathy escape, but Bart and the grandmother are trapped and die in the fire. Corrine is committed to a mental institution.

After Chris drags Cathy from Foxworth Hall, he informs her that Henny has had a stroke and, while trying to help her, Paul suffered a massive heart attack. Cathy returns to Paul, marries him and gives birth to Bart Jr. Paul dies when Bart Jr. is still quite young, and on his deathbed encourages Cathy to be with Chris, who has loved her and waited for her all these years. Realizing that Chris was the right one for her all along and that she still loves him, Cathy agrees. They move to California with the two boys and live as the Sheffields. Cathy dreads what will happen if their secret is exposed, and the book ends with her stating that she has been having strange thoughts about the attic in their house and has put two twin beds up there.

== Characters ==
- Julian Marquet: Cathy's first husband. He is a talented ballet dancer but a terrible spouse. He abuses Cathy, is unfaithful, and forbids her to see Chris and Paul. It is also implied that he sexually abuses Carrie. He is severely injured in a car accident. Despite being told Cathy was pregnant with his child, he commits suicide after "learning" he will never dance again, with which Cathy disagrees. Cathy finds that she and Julian share similar abused-child mindset.
- Julian "Jory" Janus Marquet: Cathy's first son, fathered by Julian. He is Cathy's pride and joy, due to his brilliant dance skills and beauty. He physically resembles his father but his character is kind and gentle like Chris. He has his father's fierce temper but he is never violent and loves Chris as his father.
- Paul Sheffield: A doctor who lives in Clairmont. He becomes the legal guardian of the Dollanganger children. He finances Chris through medical school, Cathy through ballet school, and pays for Carrie to attend an expensive boarding school. He marries Cathy towards the end of the book and, after having suffered prior heart attacks, dies peacefully in his sleep a few years later.
- Amanda Sheffield (Biddens): Paul's older sister. She is a scheming liar who disapproves of Paul's engagement to Cathy because of their age difference. To break them up, she tells Cathy that Paul's first wife is still alive. She further claims Cathy's D&C procedure aborted the two-headed monster embryo in a jar sitting on Paul's desk.
- Julia Sheffield: Paul's first wife and the mother of their son Scotty. She was frigid and withheld sex from Paul yet demanded fidelity from him. To punish Paul for having an affair, Julia murdered Scotty by drowning him in a river. She attempted to drown herself too but was taken to the hospital in a coma and died later on.
- Bart Sheffield: Cathy's second son, fathered by Cathy's stepfather Bart Winslow. He envies his older brother Jory, believing that Jory is their mother's favourite. He grew up believing Paul was his father until the truth comes out in If There Be Thorns. He is a curious, precocious child who notices he does not look like Paul and wonders why he has no interest in becoming a doctor.
- Henrietta "Henny" Beech: A housemaid to Dr. Sheffield who helps Chris and Cathy when Carrie is ill. She is able to hear but not speak and communicates in written messages. Her personality is nurturing and motherly. She is a good cook and has a weight problem which contributes to her death from a stroke.
- Theodore Alexander "Alex" Rockingham: Carrie's fiancé. He planned on becoming a minister but tells Cathy that he would remain an electrician to save Carrie's life: "To me she was a dainty doll who didn't know she was beautiful. And if God lets her die I will never in this life find my credence again!"

== Adaptation ==
The book was adapted into a television film of the same name in 2014. Unlike the book, the film jumped 10 years ahead from the events of Flowers. It starred Rose McIver as Cathy, Wyatt Nash as Christopher, replacing Kiernan Shipka and Mason Dye from the previous movie, respectively, and Will Kemp as Julian Marquet, with Heather Graham as Corrine and Ellen Burstyn as Olivia Foxworth. Production for the film began on February 25, 2014, in Los Angeles. The film premiered on May 26, 2014, on Lifetime.
