= Christopher's Diary: Secrets of Foxworth =

2014 Gothic novel by V.C. Andrews

- First edition (publ. Simon & Schuster)
- Author: V. C. Andrews
- Language: English
- Series: Dollanganger series spinoff
- Genre: Gothic horror Family saga
- Publisher: Simon & Schuster
- Publication date: 2014
- Publication place: United States
- Media type: Print
- Followed by: Christopher's Diary: Echoes of Dollanganger (2015)

Christopher's Diary: Secrets of Foxworth is a 2014 American Gothic novel based on the writings of V.C. Andrews' Dollanganger saga. It is a spin-off to the Dollanganger saga and records the events of the first book Flowers in the Attic from the perspective of Christopher Dollanganger in details that were not mentioned in the first book.

== Synopsis ==
Christopher Dollanganger was fourteen when he and his younger siblings—Cathy and twins Cory and Carrie—were locked away in the attic of Foxworth Hall, prisoners of their mother's greedy inheritance scheme.

For three long years he kept hope alive for the sake of the others. But the shocking truth about how their ordeal affected him was always kept hidden—until now.

Kristen Masterwood is thrilled when her father's construction company is hired to inspect the Foxworth property for a prospective buyer. The once-grand Southern mansion still sparks legends and half-truths about the four innocent Dollanganger children—and holds a special fascination for Kristin, who was too young when her mother died to learn much about her distant blood tie to the notorious family. Accompanying her dad to the "forbidden territory," Kristin rescues a leather-bound book found in the rubble, its yellowed pages filled with the neat script of Christopher Dollanganger himself. And as she devours his shattering account of temptation, heartache, courage, and betrayal, her obsession with the doomed boy crosses a dangerous line...

== Sequels ==
The book is directly succeeded by Christopher's Diary: Echoes of Dollanganger.
