= Gates of Paradise =

Novel by V. C. Andrews

- Author: V. C. Andrews
- Language: English
- Series: Casteel series
- Genre: Gothic horror Family saga
- Publisher: Simon & Schuster
- Publication date: 1989
- Publication place: United States
- Media type: Print
- Pages: 448
- Preceded by: Fallen Hearts
- Followed by: Web of Dreams

Gates of Paradise is the fourth novel of V. C. Andrews's The Casteel series written by her ghostwritter Andrew Neiderman.

== Summary ==
Having grown up in Winnerow, Annie had been raised by her loving parents and was surrounded by her extended family: Drake, whom she looked at more like a brother, Fanny, her loud country aunt, and her half-brother Luke, who is her best friend. She and Luke also seem to be romantically interested in each other, but they push those feelings down as they are half-siblings and cousins. After having a fight coming home from Aunt Fanny's 40th birthday party, Heaven and Logan get into a car accident which leaves them dead and Annie a crippled orphan.

Annie is sent to Farthingale Manor to live and recover with Tony Tatterton, whom she thinks is just her step-great-grandfather. Things start out strange when Tony strongly insists she dye her hair silvery blonde like her grandmother Leigh's natural hair color. She complies after much coaxing from Tony that it will make her feel fresh and new. She is allowed to see her parents' grave, and spots a mysterious man standing by her mother's grave, who disappears quickly. She grows concerned when she's not allowed a phone or any visitors, feeling she is being tricked and deceived. When Drake visits her, she tries to explain her worries about what is happening, but Drake tells her she is imagining things and Tony wants the best for her and is spending a considerable amount of money on her recovery. Annie then grows weary of her "trained" Nurse's rough treatments and harshness with her. She starts to get more of her pride back after thinking her situation through and imagining what her mother would say to her. With her newfound courage, Annie refuses to eat the bland food prepared by Ryse Williams (also known as Rye Whiskey) on her private nurse's orders. Annie makes her take it back and has Ryse make her some of his "tasty food". The nurse becomes enraged but follows orders and allows Rye Whiskey to prepare regular food for Annie. After eating the food, Annie has bad stomach problems and goes to the bathroom all over herself in her wheel chair. She is then thrown into a bathtub full of scalding hot water by the nurse who tells her that she knew this would happen, this being the reason for the unflavored food she had Rye prepare for Annie. Annie being tired and defeated gives into the nurse's medicinal tactics and falls asleep. Soon after, Rye Whiskey tells her that the nurse put something in the new food he prepared for Annie. Annie puts two and two together and figures out the nurse put medicine in her food to make her sick and was being cruel on purpose. She tells Tony, who then fires the nurse and takes up the position of Annie's nurse, much to Annie's dismay.

Soon after Tony has a ramp and electric wheelchair installed onto the banister but insists Annie waits until later on to try it out. Annie, stifled from not being able to practice walking (a recently acquired strength) and feeling rebellious, ventures downstairs then outside to make a call to Luke for him to come see her and explore the grounds. As she wheels herself about, she stumbles upon the overrun English maze and stares at it for a while until she is approached by the mysterious man at her mother's grave. He says his name is Timothy Brothers and he grew to know her mother quite well after working for Mr. Tatterton for so long. He asks her if she would like him to wheel her into the maze and maybe see the cottage. She hesitates at first but quickly agrees, and they set off, talking about Heaven all the while. Annie becomes suspicious right away thinking not even a longtime employee should know all that "Timothy Brothers" knows about her mother, but she ignores it until they get into the cottage. They sit and talk awhile about Heaven, until Mr. Brothers reveals he's actually Troy Tatterton. He tells Annie the story of his life and how close he grew to Heaven, leaving out the relationship they had. He helps Annie walk a little and grows concerned when Annie tells him about Tony's weird behavior. He suggests that she should go home. He finally wheels her back after some time for fear of Tony being angry at her for leaving and not letting anyone know where she went. When she gets back to Farthy, Tony and the servants are in an uproar looking for her but are relieved she is back. Tony yells at her and orders her up to her room. Tony later comes in and, thinking Annie is really her grandmother Leigh, attempts to rape her like he did Heaven. Fortunately, Tony snaps out of his confusion before accomplishing his initial intentions.

Annie realizes the next morning after he acts like nothing happened that Tony is not mentally well and wants to keep her there forever. Luke then arrives at Farthy to come to Annie's aid after getting her message and an anonymous phone call from a man insisting he come get her. But he is turned away by Tony, who insists she's not allowed visitors. Luke phones his mother, Annie's Aunt Fanny, who comes to help Luke get Annie. When they arrive, her Aunt Fanny (who seems more mature than Annie remembered) goes straight upstairs gathering Annie and her things. Fanny says to Annie no matter what Tony says, she and Annie will always be family. Tony, who is visibly upset, begins to scream that Annie is his because he was Heaven's father, making Annie his granddaughter. Annie learns that Aunt Fanny has known that as well, due to a letter Heaven and her brother Tom had written Fanny before he died. Nonetheless, Annie returns to her old home in Winnerrow with Fanny (who seems to be trying to turn her life around, giving up her wild ways and trying to be more like Heaven) and Luke. Upon an extremely warm arrival home Annie receives a phone call from a furious Drake telling her that she has put Tony in a deep depression and that she will ruin her life by doing this. Annie accuses Drake of not caring about her and being seduced by Tony's money and the promise of power. Drake protests, but Annie sees that she has pinpointed it exactly and sadly gives up on Drake. Annie and Luke are still in love with each other but know they cannot be together.

Soon after, Tony dies and Luke and Annie travel back to Farthy to attend the funeral. Troy is there and notices how Annie and Luke are fighting against their true feelings for each other. After the funeral Troy invites Luke and Annie back to the cottage for some food and conversation. He then tells Annie how he and Heaven were engaged, but then they found out that Tony had raped Leigh and was Heaven's father. He goes on to confess that he left Heaven after the revelation, and even let her believe he was dead. Heaven then married Logan, but Troy and Heaven were briefly reunited and had made forbidden love, and that he believes beyond a doubt that he is Annie's true father; thus, Annie and Luke are not half-siblings and they decide to have a relationship. Soon after, the book ends with Annie happily making progress with her legs, and planning to marry Luke.

== Adaptation ==
On August 17, 2019, Lifetime aired an adaption of Gates of Paradise starring Lizzie Boys, Jason Priestley, Keenan Tracey, Jason Cermak, and Daphne Zuniga. On August 25, 2019, a "special edition" of the film aired that featured behind the scenes interviews with Boys, Priestley, Tracey, and Cermak.
