= Rain (2006 film) =

- Directed by: Craig DiBona
- Written by: Andrew Neiderman
- Based on: The Hudson series by V. C. Andrews
- Produced by: Johnny Dela Valdene; Candace Farrell; Suzanne Heinz
- Starring: Brooklyn Sudano; Faye Dunaway; Robert Loggia
- Cinematography: Craig DiBona
- Edited by: Robert M. Reitano
- Production company: Merv Griffin Entertainment
- Distributed by: PorchLight Entertainment
- Release date: April 20, 2006
- Running time: 105 minutes
- Country: United States

Rain is a 2006 film directed by Craig DiBona. The screenplay was written by Andrew Neiderman, based on the novel by V. C. Andrews. It premiered at the Palm Beach International Film Festival.

== Plot ==
A talented young pianist named Rain (Brooklyn Sudano) is attacked by a vicious street gang which kills her sister. The gang sets out to find Rain while she hides in the care of a woman who is her natural grandmother. Rain was put up for adoption because the father of the baby was black and the mother was from a rich white family. Her adoptive mother (Khandi Alexander) sends her back because she is in danger for having witnessed her adoptive sister's murder.

== Cast ==
- Brooklyn Sudano as Rain Arnold
- Faye Dunaway as Isabel Hudson
- Robert Loggia as Jake
- Khandi Alexander as Latitia Arnold
- Giancarlo Esposito as Ken Arnold
- Emily Ryals as Monica
- Katie Fountain as Colleen Lewis
