= Dark Angel (Andrews novel) =

1986 book written by V. C. Andrews

- Author: V. C. Andrews
- Language: English
- Series: Casteel series
- Genre: Gothic horror Family saga
- Publisher: Simon & Schuster
- Publication date: 1986
- Publication place: United States
- Media type: Print
- Pages: 448
- Preceded by: Heaven
- Followed by: Fallen Hearts

Dark Angel is a 1986 book written by V. C. Andrews. It is the second book in the Casteel Series and was also the last book written by Andrews before her death.

== Summary ==
After the events of Heaven, Heaven Casteel finds herself in the care and custody of her grandparents, the wealthy Tony and Jillian Tatterton, who live at Farthinggale Manor. Heaven dreams of a wonderful new life - of new friends, a good school, beautiful clothes and, most importantly, love. She wishes to make her family name respectable, find her brothers and sisters, and have a family once again.

Conflict with her newfound grandparents soon arises, however. Her grandmother Jillian is vain and selfish, while her step-grandfather, Tony, veers from being dignified and generous to being controlling and domineering. The only person Heaven can talk to is Tony's brother, Troy, who has depression. While Heaven is given everything she wants in material terms - beautiful clothes, a fine education and enough money to go to college - she is still unhappy due to Tony's stipulation that she must not see her brothers and sisters. If she does, Tony will cease all financial support. Heaven does not try to see Tom and Fanny, but she does continue to write them letters, and continues her efforts to find Jane and Keith.

After a time, Troy and Heaven fall in love, become lovers, and plan to marry. Tony is thrilled, but Jillian is troubled. Heaven decides to see her family and lies to Tony about going to New York City. Heaven finds Jane and Keith in Washington D.C., living happily with their adoptive parents — they are upset to see Heaven and tell her to go away. Heartbroken by their rejection, Heaven then discovers Fanny is living in a boarding home in Nashville, Tennessee and may be prostituting herself due to lack of money. Fanny reveals that she was forced to give her baby, named Darcy, to Reverend Wayland Wise, the baby's biological father. To keep Fanny quiet, Wayland and his wife gave her some money to leave town and to never return. Fanny longs to have Darcy back and confesses that Darcy is all she can think about. She then threatens to tell Heaven's grandparents that Luke was cruel and unfaithful to Leigh, and that Leigh lived in squalor and poverty, unless Heaven gets Darcy back for her. By contrast, Tom is living happily with his father and Luke's new wife, Stacie, who has just had a baby boy named Drake. Tom is helping his father with the circus now owned by Luke. Tom tells Heaven that Luke has turned his life around thanks to Stacie.

When Heaven arrives in West Virginia, she encounters her first love, Logan. Although Logan is still angry and hurt over Heaven's sexual relationship with her adoptive father, Cal (from the previous book), he also seems to still have feelings for her. Heaven pays a visit to Rev. Wise and attempts to buy Darcy back for Fanny. While doing this, Heaven realizes that she is a lot more like Luke than she ever wanted to admit. Rev. Wise and his wife beg her to not take Darcy from them, telling Heaven that she knows that Darcy will be better off if Fanny is not in her life. Heaven reluctantly agrees and returns to the family cabin, heartbroken over her inability to rescue Darcy. A huge storm wrecks the cabin, and Heaven becomes sick. Logan nurses her back to health but it is a few weeks before she can return to Boston. Before leaving, Heaven speaks to Fanny again and tells her she could not get Darcy back. Fanny says she really didn't think it would happen and thanks Heaven for trying.

Heaven returns to Boston to learn that Troy is sick, partly due to thinking Heaven abandoned him. Tony unexpectedly tries to persuade Heaven to break off her relationship with Troy (even going so far as to bribe her with money). Heaven refuses, which forces Tony to reveal his shameful secret: He believes she is not Luke's daughter but his, as he raped her mother (though he claims Leigh willingly continued the relationship after that). Not wanting Tony and Jillian to know that Leigh married Luke the day they met and got pregnant right away, Heaven had lied to them about her age when she first arrived, saying she was a year younger than her actual age. On seeing Heaven's true birthdate, Tony realized that Leigh must have been pregnant when she ran away. This means that if Tony is Heaven's father, Troy is Heaven's uncle.

Heaven still declares her love for Troy and intends to be with him, but Troy flees the Tatterton estate after Jillian reveals the truth to him. He leaves Heaven a note and tells her to confront Jillian about what really happened to Leigh. Heaven follows his advice and continues to throw the truth in Jillian's face as Jillian gets more and more upset. Unable to cope with the reality that she chose wealth and comfort over her own daughter, Jillian eventually loses her sanity. Despite the revelation of her true paternity and the loss of Troy, Heaven remains with the Tattertons throughout her college years. Tony invites Keith and Jane to her graduation party, and they embrace her, explaining that seeing Heaven brought back memories of their poor, difficult life in the Willies, and they were afraid she was coming to take them back there. While they have missed Heaven, they did not want to leave their adoptive parents. Heaven is ecstatic to have Keith and Jane back in her life. When Heaven returns to Boston after some traveling, she is told by a distraught Tony that Troy died as the result of a horse riding accident in the ocean while she was away.

No longer reliant on Tony's money, Heaven moves to Winnerrow and lives in the newly renovated cabin of her youth. She becomes a respected teacher, and bleaches her black hair silvery blonde, like her mother. When she receives an invitation to visit the circus owned by Luke Casteel, Heaven decides that it is finally time to see him again. Wanting Luke to understand that his beloved Leigh is alive in her, she decides to wear the dress Leigh wore when she first met Luke (given to Heaven by her grandmother Annie, Luke's mother, when she was young). But when Luke sees Heaven, she looks so much like her mother that he thinks she really is Leigh and he is completely distracted. A tiger gets loose and Tom rushes in to save the animal trainer. Tom is mauled to death, and Luke is badly injured. Heaven is devastated by Tom's death. She visits Luke in his hospital bed and tells him that she is sorry for everything that went wrong between them but flees before he can reply. Logan is there for her in the dark days and they become close again.

Months after Tom's death, Heaven's grandfather dies. Luke lets Heaven know that she will always be welcome with his family. Heaven and Logan make plans to marry, but first Heaven feels they must go to Boston and see her real father Tony.

== Adaptation ==
On August 3, 2019, Lifetime aired an adaptation of Dark Angel starring Annalise Basso, Jason Priestley, Jason Cermak, Matreya Scarrwener, James Rittinger, Jessica Clement, Chris William Martin, and Kelly Rutherford. A "special edition" of the film aired on August 10, 2019 that featured behind the scenes interviews with Basso, Priestley, and Cermak.
