= The Baby Squad =

Book by Andrew Neiderman

- Paperback first edition
- Author: Andrew Neiderman
- Language: English
- Genre: Dystopian, thriller
- Publisher: Pocket Star Books
- Publication date: August 2003
- Publication place: United States
- Media type: Print (paperback)
- Pages: 374 pp
- ISBN: 0-7434-1270-2 (paperback edition)
- OCLC: 52642751
- LC Class: CPB Box no. 2105 vol. 12

The Baby Squad is a dystopian thriller by Andrew Neiderman first published in 2003. Set in the United States in the not-too-distant future, the novel envisages a future American society where giving birth to children is illegal and where only few women are biologically able to reproduce.

== Plot introduction ==
Perfect babies are created in laboratories outside the woman's womb and then put up for adoption. When the wife of an aspiring local politician becomes pregnant she reluctantly confides in her husband and is secretly sent to an institution where she can spend the remaining months of her pregnancy and give birth to her baby. However, she feels imprisoned and threatened there and starts doubting her husband's good intentions.

=== Explanation of the novel's title ===
The "baby squad" of the title is a voluntary communal organisation led by a militant woman which has formed to root out dissidents.

== See also ==
- Voluntary childlessness
