= Fallen Hearts =

Book by Virginia C. Andrews

- Author: V. C. Andrews
- Language: English
- Series: Casteel series
- Genre: Gothic horror Family saga
- Publisher: Simon & Schuster
- Publication date: 1988
- Publication place: United States
- Media type: Print
- Pages: 416
- Preceded by: Dark Angel
- Followed by: Gates of Paradise

Fallen Hearts (1988) is the third novel in American novelist V. C. Andrews's Casteel Series. The book was finished by her ghostwriter Andrew Neiderman, though the book was published under Andrews's name.

== Synopsis ==
Proud and beautiful Heaven Casteel comes back to live in the West Virginia hills (the "Willies," the part of Winnerow, West Virginia in which she grew up)- to rise at last above her family's shame. As Logan's bride, she was to finally have the love she had sought for so long. Free from her father's avarice and abuse, she planned to live again in her home town, a respected teacher and cherished wife. However, after a wedding trip to Boston's Farthingale Manor and a lavish, elegant party, Heaven and Logan are persuaded to stay in Boston, lured by Tony Tatterton to live amidst his family's wealth and privilege. The ghosts of Heaven's past rise up once more, writhing around her fragile happiness and threatening her precious love with scandal and jealousy, sinister passions, and dangerous dreams.

== Plot ==
Heaven is living in Winnerrow and working as an elementary school teacher. She has resumed her relationship with Logan after her departure from Farthingale Manor ("Farthy") that followed Troy's death. Logan proposes to Heaven, and she accepts. She feels compelled to invite her biological father, Tony, to the wedding and, thanks to Logan's correspondence with Tony, the Tatterton and Casteel families agree to attend the wedding and arrange to have the reception at Farthingale Manor.

Heaven is excited about marrying Logan. However, her wedding day is almost ruined when Luke decides not to give Heaven away, and Fanny, who serves as the maid of honor, swings her new husband around the dance floor and kisses him in front of the guests to embarrass Heaven. Despite having told Heaven she is always welcome in his family, Luke avoids her, which disappoints Heaven, who wants a father-daughter relationship with him in spite of how he treats her. Heaven and Logan travel to Farthingale Manor for their honeymoon, but Heaven is worried about being there and thinks it's a mistake. She is also uncomfortable being around Tony, who seems to obsess over her because of her dyed-blonde hair, which reminds him of her dead mother, Leigh. Jillian's mental illness is also a major concern for Heaven, as her grandmother frequently claims that Leigh seduced Tony (rather than the reality, which is that Tony raped her). Heaven wants to leave as soon as the honeymoon is over, but Tony is determined to keep her at Farthingale and close to him. He persuades Logan to work in the Tatterton family business and forgo his original plan to become a pharmacist. Heaven is disappointed but gives in because of Logan's enthusiasm.

Over time, Jillian and her servants claim a ghost lives in the condemned parts of Farthingale Manor. Logan spends most of his time in Winnerow, setting up and building the Tatterton toy factory there. While he is away, Heaven's curiosity gets the better of her, and she explores the forbidden areas of the mansion. One night, she discovers that her uncle and former lover, Troy, whom Tony had claimed had died, is still alive and has been living in a cottage behind Farthy. Troy tells her that he had faked his death because he wanted to give Heaven the chance to live a normal life with Logan and forget about him, but she has never been able to forget. They have sex one last time before Troy decides to leave Farthingale Manor for good. When Heaven wakes up, Troy has left her a note explaining that his departure is for the best, and that he wants for her to be able to move on and be happy with Logan. Although she is heartbroken that she can't be with Troy, Heaven feels guilty for betraying Logan and vows to never to tell him of her infidelity. Meanwhile, Fanny tells Heaven that she and Logan have been intimate and that she is pregnant with their child. When Logan returns, he confesses. Although enraged by his betrayal, Heaven forgives Logan but remains estranged from Fanny.

Soon after, Heaven discovers that she is pregnant. Unsure of who the father is, she chooses not to tell Logan there is the possibility it is not his. Logan assures her that he will take care of both children but wants nothing to do with Fanny, who is only interested in getting money from them to help support herself and her child. Luke and his third wife, Stacie, are killed in a car accident, and Heaven and Logan get custody of their son, Drake, after the funeral. When Jillian dies, Heaven discovers a secret contract between Tony and Luke, in which Tony gave Luke enough money to save his circus, on the condition that Luke never see Heaven again. Heaven is devastated that Luke has "sold" her once again. When he is intoxicated, Tony tries to rape Heaven, but she fights back and avoids him thereafter. To spite Heaven and Logan, Fanny fights for custody of Drake and almost wins when she gets Tony to admits that he is Heaven's father, and therefore, Heaven is not a blood relative of Drake's. Heaven demands for Fanny to drop the custody fight, and later offers Fanny a million dollars in exchange for Drake. After a heated argument, Fanny agrees, and Drake is returned to Heaven and Logan.

Finally and almost simultaneously, Heaven gives birth to a girl named Annie, and Fanny has a boy named Luke. After Annie is born, Heaven receives an anonymous gift from Troy that lets her know he is aware of the birth and that Annie is his daughter. Heaven does not tell Logan of this and decides to raise Annie as if she is Logan's biological daughter.

== Adaptation ==
On August 10, 2019, Lifetime aired an adaptation of Fallen Hearts starring Annalise Basso, Jason Priestley (who also directed the film), James Rittinger, Chris William Martin, Jason Cermak, Jessica Clement, Matthew Nelson Mahood, Nicole Oliver, and Kelly Rutherford. There were some differences in the film version. Heaven never explores the mansion and finds Troy. She goes back into the maze where Troy appears to her and takes her back to the cottage. There was never any mention of ghosts or servants and Jillian mentioning such. A "special edition" of the film aired on August 17, 2019.
