= Midnight Whispers =

1992 novel by V. C. Andrews

- First edition cover of Midnight Whispers
- Author: V. C. Andrews
- Language: English
- Series: Cutler series
- Genre: Gothic horror Family saga
- Publisher: Simon & Schuster
- Publication date: November 1992
- Publication place: United States
- Media type: Print
- Pages: 440
- ISBN: 0-671-69516-9
- Preceded by: Twilight's Child 1991
- Followed by: Darkest Hour 1993

Midnight Whispers is the fourth novel in the Cutler series, written in 1992 by the ghost-writer of V. C. Andrews novels, Andrew Neiderman. The novel centres on the child of the protagonist of the first three novels.

== Plot summary ==
Christie Longchamp is a musician whose mother owns and operates the Cutler's Cove hotel. They live nearby with Christie's stepfather Jimmy and her nine-year-old half-brother Jefferson while her Uncle Philip, his wife Aunt Bet and their twin children, Richard and Melanie, reside in the family section of Cutler's Cove.

The story commences on Christie's sixteenth birthday. A grand party is being held at the hotel for her extended family and school friends, but to Christie, the only person whose arrival matters is her stepfather's seventeen-year-old half-brother, Gavin. Fern, Jimmy's younger sister and the problem child of the family, also arrives unexpectedly, mainly to upset Dawn and Jimmy (showing she has not changed since Twilight's Child). She presents Christie with a copy of Lady Chatterley's Lover. Christie throws it into her closet, appalled by her aunt's insinuations and promiscuousness. Despite Fern's wild and drunken behaviour, the party is a great success, and the evening concludes with Gavin confessing his love for Christie.

The next day, Christie and Jefferson return home from school to find that Cutler's Cove has burned to the ground after a boiler in the basement exploded. Jimmy, who was in the basement, was trapped and Dawn tried to save him, but they both perished in the blaze. It is revealed that Philip and Bet are now their legal guardians, and they proceed to move into Christie's house to establish themselves as the new heads of the Cutler empire. Although Aunt Bet explains to Jefferson and Christie that they must all compromise and sacrifice, Christie notices that it is only she and Jefferson who are being asked to make sacrifices. All of Dawn and Jimmy's belongings are either removed or seized by Aunt Bet. Aunt Bet is unable to get along with Jefferson, constantly criticizing him, and Richard frames him for naughty deeds just to get him in trouble. Christie fights with her about this but to no avail. Christie then pleads with her uncle to allow Jefferson and herself more freedom, but Philip sides with his wife, as he has had little willpower since Dawn's death. After some time, Laura Sue dies, which adds to Philip's deteriorating mental state.

Gradually, Christie notices her uncle is lavishing affection on her and trying to have intimate, personal conversations with her. Christie grows increasingly disturbed and worried by her uncle's behavior, especially after he gives her lingerie and she catches him watching her bathe, but it is not until her Aunt Bet finds the forgotten copy of Lady Chatterley's Lover and punishes her that her suspicions evolve into fear. Later that night, Uncle Philip, overcome by desire and fury at never having been able to possess her mother, enters Christie's room and rapes her, mixing her up with her mother as he does so. Heartbroken and confused, Christie buys bus tickets to New York so she and Jefferson can go in search of her mysterious biological father. But her biological father is an alcoholic and does not match the image Christie had of him. In her disappointment, she leaves and calls the only man she still believes in, Gavin. When Gavin arrives, Christie confesses what her uncle has done, and in his fury and disgust he refuses to allow her to return home. Together they decide to hide out at 'The Meadows', the mysterious plantation where Christie was born. Her great-great Aunt Charlotte, who is mentally disabled, lives there with her husband, Luther, and they take in the runaways.

Gavin and Christie begin to explore the grounds, and gradually they learn many of the family's secrets that have remained buried inside the house, such as the fact Grandmother Cutler was raped by her father, the torture Dawn suffered at the hands of Emily when she was pregnant with Christie, and how Emily used Luther as a slave for impregnating Charlotte. Gradually, the isolation pulls them closer together, until they finally consummate their relationship, with Christie asking Gavin to take away her shame by making her love for him feel right. Then Fern and her boyfriend Monty arrive. Fern takes over the household and bullies the family, making Christie her slave as revenge for the constant disapproval of Christie's parents. She has no interest in why Christie and Jefferson are hiding out at The Meadows, assuming that Christie finally got bored of being a good girl and ran away. When Christie tells Fern about her rape, Fern's response is that Christie must have seduced him.

When Jefferson cuts himself on a rusty nail and becomes terribly ill with tetanus, Christie is forced to come out of hiding to save her brother's life. Fern and Monty leave immediately when Jefferson becomes ill, fearful of getting into trouble. Phillip immediately comes to claim Christie and Jefferson and take them back 'home'. Christie is terrified of Philip, but she is so afraid for Jefferson's life that she has no choice but to return with him. Gavin tries to stay with her, but Philip forces him to leave and takes his niece back to Cutler's Cove. Locked in her room by Aunt Bet and finding her beloved Sweet 16 party dress shredded by Richard, Christie is miserable and frightened. Although she has lived in this house for almost her whole life, she no longer feels safe or at home there. Enraged by how her relatives have intimidated her, Christie tips the twins' bowls of chowder onto their laps and tells Aunt Bet what Philip did to her. This appears to drive Aunt Bet over the edge. On the brink of insanity, Philip drives Christie to the beach where he took her mother years ago, and again tries to rape her while calling her Dawn the whole time. Christie manages to fight him off, and runs to her grandmother's husband, Bronson Alcott, who finally learns what Philip has done. Philip is found to be mentally ill and delusional, and is taken away. Aunt Bet can't face the public shame, so she and the twins move out of the house to live with Aunt Bet's parents.

The novel concludes with Jefferson's recovery. Christie and her brother live in Bronson's house and Christie is pursuing her dream of becoming a concert pianist while maintaining a long-distance relationship with Gavin. It appears that the Cutler 'curse' has finally been broken.

== Characters ==
- Jefferson Longchamp: Son of Dawn and Jimmy, and younger half-brother of Christie. He is described as messy and hot-tempered.
- Richard Cutler: Son of Philip and Betty Ann, and twin brother of Melanie. He is hostile to his cousins.
- Melanie Culter: Daughter of Philip and Betty Ann, and twin sister of Richard. She is jealous of Christie and always defends Richard.
- Gavin Longchamp: Younger half-brother of Jimmy and Fern, and son of Ormand and Edwina. He has been in love with Christie since childhood and comes to her side when she runs away from the hotel.
- Edwina Longchamp: Second wife of Ormand and mother of Gavin.
- Homer: A neighbor of the Booth plantation. It is revealed that he is the son of Charlotte and Luther, and was abandoned by Emily. A neighboring family found him and raised him as their own. Like Charlotte, he is mentally disabled yet kind, and almost never speaks.
