= Miranda Frigon =

Canadian actor and songwriter (born 1980)

- Born: February 8, 1980 (age 46); Edmonton, Alberta, Canada
- Other names: Randy, Mira
- Occupations: Actress, singer
- Years active: 1998–present
- Children: 1

Miranda Frigon (born February 8, 1980) is a Canadian actress and singer-songwriter. She starred in the television series Primeval: New World (2012–13) and Day of the Dead (2021) and played Lynn Liggett-Smith in the Hallmark Movies & Mysteries movie series Aurora Teagarden Mysteries from 2015 to 2022.

== Life and career ==
Frigon was born in Edmonton, Alberta, Canada. She studied acting at the University of Alberta before receiving a scholarship to the American Musical and Dramatic Academy in New York City. In 1998, she made her acting debut playing the recurring role on the syndicated sitcom Honey, I Shrunk the Kids: The TV Show. The following years, Frigon guest-starred on Higher Ground, First Wave, The 4400, Tru Calling, The Dead Zone, Ugly Betty, and Dexter.

From 2003 to 2004, Frigon had a recurring role as Tech Agent Susan Carver in the UPN science fiction series, Jake 2.0. In 2005, she made her big screen debut playing secondary role in the horror thriller film White Noise. She later appeared in films It Waits (2006), Next (2007), and Little Pink House (2017). Frigon also starred in a number of made-for-television movies for syfy, Lifetime and Hallmark Channel. In 2016, she released her debut studio album titled First.

Frigon starred in the Space science fiction series Primeval: New World from 2012 to 2013 and had a recurring role on Heartland from 2010 to 2016. From 2015 to 2022, she played Lynn Liggett-Smith in the Hallmark Movies & Mysteries movie series Aurora Teagarden Mysteries from 2015 to 2022. In 2021, she starred in the Syfy horror series, Day of the Dead. In 2023, she starred in the Lifetime movie series V.C. Andrews' Dawn playing lead character's mother.
