= James H. Hutson =

American historian

- Born: James Howard Hutson; 1937 (age 88–89)
- Education: Yale University (PhD)
- Occupations: Historian; author

James Howard Hutson (born 1937) was a historian and author of early American history and is considered a leading scholar about the influence of religion during the American founding and has written a number of books and journals on this subject. An alumni and faculty member of Yale University, he was Chief of the Manuscript division at the Library of Congress.

== Education and career ==
Hutson received his Ph.D. in history from Yale University in 1964. Since 1982, he has been a member of the History Departments at Yale University and William and Mary College and is Chief of their Library's Manuscript Division.

Hutson was the supervisory librarian at the Library of Congress. He taught history at Yale University and served as assistant editor of The Papers of Benjamin Franklin. Hutson was a Coordinator of the American Revolution Bicentennial Programs at the Library of Congress and was a lecturer at the College of William & Mary and Yale University.

== Works ==
Hutson has written a number of books and journals which include:

- Hutson, James H. (1972). Pennsylvania Politics, 1746-1770: The Movement for Royal Government and Its Consequences. Princeton University Press. ISBN 978-0-6910-4611-2.
- —— (Winter 1980). "Pierce Butler's Records of the Federal Constitutional Convention". The Quarterly Journal of the Library of Congress. 37 (1): 64–73. JSTOR 29781839.
- —— (1980). John Adams and the diplomacy of the American Revolution. University Press of Kentucky=.
- —— (July 1981). "Country, Court, and Constitution: Antifederalism and the Historians". The William and Mary Quarterly. 38 (3). Omohundro Institute of Early American History and Culture: 337–368. doi:10.2307/1921952. JSTOR 1921952.
- —— (December 1984). "The Creation of the Constitution: Scholarship at a Standstill". Reviews in American History. 12 (4): 463–477. doi:10.2307/2701897. JSTOR 2701897.
- —— (July 1987). "Riddles of the Federal Constitutional Convention". The William and Mary Quarterly. 44 (3). Omohundro Institute of Early American History and Culture: 411–423. doi:10.2307/1939764. JSTOR 1939764.
- —— (1989). To make all laws : the Congress of the United States, 1789-1989. Library of Congress.
- —— (1991). The sister republics : Switzerland and the United States from 1776 to the present. Library of Congress.
- —— (2000). Religion and the new republic : faith in the founding of America. Rowman & Littlefield Publishers.
- —— (2003). Forgotten Features of the Founding: The Recovery of Religious Themes in the Early American Republic. Lexington Books. ISBN 978-0-7391-0570-2.
- —— (2005). The founders on religion : a book of quotations. Princeton University Press.
- —— (2008). Church and state in America : the first two centuries. Cambridge University Press.

== See also ==
- Bibliography of the United States Constitution

== Sources ==
- Hutson, James H. (2003). Forgotten Features of the Founding: The Recovery of Religious Themes in the Early American Republic. Lexington Books. ISBN 978-0-7391-0570-2.
- "Biography - James Hutson". 19 September 2017. Archived from the original on 12 April 2024.
