= Twilight's Child =

Book by Virginia C. Andrews

- First edition cover of Twilight's Child
- Author: V. C. Andrews
- Language: English
- Series: Cutler series
- Genre: Gothic horror Family saga
- Publisher: Simon & Schuster
- Publication date: February 1992
- Publication place: United States
- Media type: Print
- Pages: 410
- ISBN: 0-671-69514-2
- Preceded by: Secrets of the Morning 1991
- Followed by: Midnight Whispers 1992

Twilight's Child was written in 1992 by V. C. Andrews. It is the third novel of five in the Cutler series.

== Plot summary ==
Dawn and Jimmy arrange to find out what happened to Dawn's daughter Christie, who was placed for adoption by Grandmother Cutler. Thanks to the hotel lawyer, Dawn and Jimmy quickly get Christie back, as the adoption process was not legal. Dawn and Jimmy make plans to marry. Although she dislikes the hotel and would rather become a singer, Dawn takes up the running of Cutler's Cove. Randolph, Dawn's stepfather and half-brother, is haunted by the death of his mother, and starts to drink excessively. The only thing that makes him happy is Christie, but he begins to wander away from the hotel, often forgetting where he is and begins pretending that his mother is still alive.

Dawn marries Jimmy, and her brother Philip acts as best man. Philip, who has obsessed over Dawn since prior to finding out they were related, acts strangely during the wedding, muttering the vows under his breath as if he were marrying Dawn. As Randolph is not at the ceremony to give Dawn away, Bronson Alcott, a friend of Dawn's mother, does instead. On their wedding night, Dawn and Jimmy finally consummate their relationship. However, the honeymoon is cut short when Randolph is found dead at his mother's grave several days later. Dawn takes full ownership of the hotel and begins spending more time on the hotel than with her family. With her husband dead, Laura Sue resumes her old relationship with Bronson Alcott and they quickly marry. Bronson later confesses to Dawn that Clara Sue is his daughter, conceived during an affair that began after Dawn's "kidnapping".

Soon after, Dawn discovers that she is pregnant with Jimmy's child. Dawn decides that Clara Sue should go and live with Bronson and their mother, and has Clara Sue's things moved to Bronson's house. When Clara Sue comes home and finds out about Dawn's decision, she becomes angry and attacks Dawn, causing her to miscarry. Clara Sue is ostracized by nearly everyone for this act, her mother being the only exception. The miscarriage has a devastating impact on Dawn and Jimmy. Dawn resorts to the hotel to ease her grief, withdrawing from Jimmy and Christie, and it takes a long time for them to recover from this tragic event.

Phillip announces that he is engaged to a classmate, Betty Ann Monroe. Clara Sue purposely embarrasses the family at his graduation ceremony by bringing one of her sleazy boyfriends along. Phillip marries Betty Ann, but still obsesses over Dawn, to the point that he has Betty Ann dye her hair blonde, wear Dawn's nightgown and perfume, and goes to the same place where Dawn and Jimmy went on their honeymoon. Clara Sue returns to torment Dawn: she claims the hotel should be hers, because Dawn is illegitimate, but Dawn reveals that Clara Sue is also illegitimate and has no right to the hotel. She tells Clara Sue to ask Bronson if she wants proof. Since her miscarriage, Dawn seems unable to conceive; Dawn and Jimmy's frustration over this infertility grows when Betty Ann becomes pregnant and gives birth to twins, Melanie and Richard. Philip tells Dawn that this works out perfectly: Melanie can be for Betty Ann and Richard for Dawn. Dawn is disturbed by this statement, but she can see Philip is trying to lead a normal life and so she doesn't tell Jimmy or cut off contact with Phillip. After the birth of the twins, Jimmy decides to visit his father and stepmother in Texas. While he is away, a drunken Philip almost rapes Dawn, telling Dawn that he could get her pregnant unlike Jimmy. Fortunately, they are interrupted when Christie starts crying; Dawn sends Phillip away, reminding him that he is now married and should try to love his wife. He tries to apologize to her, but she tells him to forget it happened.

Jimmy tells Dawn that he has found out what happened to his baby sister Fern, who was adopted when his father was arrested for "kidnapping" Dawn. He found out that Fern was adopted by Clayton and Leslie Osbourne, who changed her name to Kelly Ann. Dawn and Jimmy visit the Osbournes to make sure that Fern is okay. Although they are not allowed to tell Fern who they are, she already knows about her adoption and follows them back to the hotel. She tells them that Clayton sexually abused her, so Jimmy and Dawn obtain custody of her. Fern initially seems sweet and helpful, but soon proves untrustworthy, stealing things from the hotel, smoking in the basement with older boys, and acting promiscuously. She also makes Christie and Gavin, her little half-brother, strip and try to touch each other. Jimmy continually takes her side and Fern seems to enjoy driving a wedge between her brother and sister-in-law. Dawn is upset because she cannot understand how the sweet baby she used to care for has become this resentful, deceptive teenager.

Christie's father, Michael, reappears in Dawn's life. He asks to see Christie, and Dawn reluctantly agrees. Michael then claims to be remorseful and asks for a second chance, but Dawn rejects him, saying nothing can ever take her away from Jimmy. Michael then demands $5,000 from Dawn to help him get back on his feet. If she refuses, he will fight for custody of Christie. With the help of the hotel lawyer and a private detective, Dawn is able to scare Michael off. Meanwhile, Clara Sue is killed in a truck accident with another boyfriend. Laura Sue has a mental breakdown following Clara Sue's death and loses touch with reality, mixing up past and present.

When she comes upon a magazine article that mirrors Fern's accusations, Dawn realizes that Fern has been lying about being sexually abused. She calls Jimmy and they confront Fern about the magazine. Fern breaks down and admits that she made up the whole story, but argues that her adoptive parents were always disappointed in her and she thought Jimmy and Dawn would treat her better as they were her 'real' family. Dawn tells her that they do want to treat her better, but that can only happen if Fern works on her attitude and stops stealing and lying to them. Fern promises that she will do better but Dawn wonders if she can really change.

Sometime later, Dawn learns from Luther that Emily has died from heart failure. Dawn feels no sorrow about this, as Emily abused and judged her, but she decides they should at least visit The Meadows to check on Charlotte, who was kind to Dawn during her pregnancy. As Dawn, Jimmy and Luther sit around talking, Luther reveals that he was the father of Charlotte's baby. He sheltered Charlotte from her father and sister after they beat and starved her, and in the process, he developed feelings for her. His final revelations is that Charlotte is actually Grandmother Cutler's daughter, the product of rape by Grandmother Cutler's father. Since Emily didn't leave a will, Charlotte inherits the plantation. The book ends with Dawn telling Jimmy that she is pregnant.

== Characters ==
- Fern Longchamp / Kelly Ann Osborne Jimmy's younger sister. Although pretty, she is very rebellious and deceitful. She lies to get her way and often clashes with Dawn over various things.
- Bronson Alcott Laura Sue's second husband and Clara Sue's biological father. He is a kind and handsome man who is well-liked. He is Laura Sue's childhood sweetheart.
- Betty Ann Monroe (Cutler): Philip's wife and the mother of Richard and Melanie. She is plain and a clean freak, and is used as a replacement of Dawn by Philip.
