= V. C. Andrews =

American novelist (1923–1986)

- Born: Cleo Virginia Andrews; June 6, 1923 Portsmouth, Virginia, U.S.
- Died: December 19, 1986 (aged 63) Virginia Beach, Virginia, U.S.
- Occupation: Novelist
- Genre: Gothic horror Family saga

Website
- vcandrewsbooks.com

Cleo Virginia Andrews (June 6, 1923 – December 19, 1986), better known as Virginia C. Andrews or V. C. Andrews, was an American novelist. She was best known for her 1979 novel Flowers in the Attic, which inspired two movie adaptations and four sequels. While her novels are not classified by her publisher as Young Adult, their young protagonists have made them popular among teenagers for decades. After her death in 1986, a ghostwriter who was initially hired to complete two unfinished works has continued to publish books under her name.

== Profile ==
Andrews's novels combine Gothic horror and family saga, revolving around family secrets and incestual, forbidden love (frequently involving themes of horrific events, and sometimes including a rags-to-riches story). Her best-known novel is the bestseller Flowers in the Attic (1979), a tale of four children smuggled into the attic of their wealthy estranged pious grandmother, and held prisoner there by their mother.

Her novels were successful enough that following Andrews's death, her estate hired a ghost writer, Andrew Neiderman, to continue to write novels to be published under her name. In assessing a deficiency in her estate tax returns, the Internal Revenue Service argued (successfully) that Virginia Andrews's name was a valuable commercial asset, the value of which should be included in her gross estate.

Her novels have been translated into Czech, French, Italian, German, Spanish, Dutch, Japanese, Korean, Turkish, Greek, Finnish, Hungarian, Swedish, Polish, Portuguese, Lithuanian, Chinese, Russian, Bulgarian and Hebrew.

== Life ==
Andrews was born in Portsmouth, Virginia, the youngest child and only daughter of Lillian Lilnora (Parker), a telephone operator, and William Henry Andrews, a tool-and-die maker. She had two older brothers, William Jr. and Eugene. Andrews grew up attending Southern Baptist and Methodist churches. As a teenager, Andrews suffered a fall from a school stairwell, resulting in severe back injuries. The subsequent surgery to correct these injuries resulted in Andrews' suffering from crippling arthritis that required her to use crutches and a wheelchair for much of her life. However, having always shown promise as an artist, she was able to complete a four-year correspondence course from her home and soon became a successful commercial artist, illustrator, and portrait painter, using her art commissions to support the family after her father's death in 1957.

Later in life, Andrews turned to writing. Her first novel, written in 1972 and titled Gods of Green Mountain, was a science fiction effort that remained unpublished during her lifetime but was eventually released as an e-book in 2004.

In 1975, Andrews completed a manuscript for a novel she called Flowers in the Attic. "I wrote it in two weeks," Andrews said. The novel was returned with the suggestion that she "spice up" and expand the story. In later interviews, Andrews claims to have made the necessary revisions in a single night. The novel, published in 1979, was an instant popular success, reaching the top of the bestseller lists in only two weeks. Every year thereafter until her death, Andrews published a new novel, each publication earning Andrews larger advances and a growing popular readership. By 1982, her horror novels had sold more than 11 million copies.

"I think I tell a whopping good story. And I don't drift away from it a great deal into descriptive material," she stated in Faces of Fear in 1985. "When I read, if a book doesn't hold my interest in what's going to happen next, I put it down and don't finish it. So I'm not going to let anybody put one of my books down and not finish it. My stuff is a very fast read." In an interview for Twilight Magazine in 1983, Andrews was questioned about the critics' response to her work. She answered, "I don't care what the critics say. I used to, until I found out that most critics are would-be writers who are just jealous because I'm getting published and they aren't. I also don't think that anybody cares about what they say. Nor should they care."

Andrews died of breast cancer on December 19, 1986, in Virginia Beach, Virginia. After her death, her family hired a ghostwriter, Andrew Neiderman, to finish the manuscripts she had started. He would complete the next two novels, Garden of Shadows and Fallen Hearts, and they were published soon after. These two novels are considered the last to bear the "V. C. Andrews" name and to be almost completely written by Andrews herself.

== Fiction ==
The following books written by (and credited to) V. C. Andrews were published within her lifetime:

- Flowers in the Attic (1979)
- Petals on the Wind (1980)
- If There Be Thorns (1981)
- My Sweet Audrina (1982)
- Seeds of Yesterday (1984)
- Heaven (1985)
- Dark Angel (1986)

The following two posthumous volumes were credited solely to V. C. Andrews, but completed by Andrew Neiderman based on outlines, story fragments, or work partially finished by Andrews before her death:

- Garden of Shadows (1987)
- Fallen Hearts (1988)

All new "V. C. Andrews" work published subsequent to 1988, while credited solely to Andrews, is the work of Neiderman, under license from the V. C. Andrews estate. Neiderman has revisited some of Andrews' original characters and settings, while also creating numerous new series that explore similar themes. A listing of works and series credited under the name "V. C. Andrews" follows.

=== By V. C. Andrews and Andrew Neiderman ===
==== The Dollanganger Family Series ====
Andrews' first series of novels was published between 1979 and 1987.

Flowers in the Attic and Petals on the Wind focus on the four Dollanganger siblings and the events that shattered their perfect life after a car accident kills their father and their eventual imprisonment in their grandparents' attic as their mother tries to win back the love of her dying estranged father who must not know of the existence of her four children. Flowers in the Attic tells of their incarceration at Foxworth Hall, the death of one child, and subsequent escape of the other three, with Petals on the Wind picking up directly after telling the story of life outside the attic walls and Cathy's eventual revenge on the mother that locked them away. The story then continues in If There Be Thorns, which follows Cathy's sons, Jory and Bart, and the mysterious new neighbor who befriends Bart, gradually turning him against his parents; to the eventual reconstruction of Foxworth Hall (which had previously burnt down in Petals) in Seeds of Yesterday. Garden of Shadows, a prequel, tells the grandparents' story and how the children's parents became involved with each other, leading to the events of the first novel.

- Flowers in the Attic (1979)
- Petals on the Wind (1980)
- If There Be Thorns (1981)
- Seeds of Yesterday (1984)
- Garden of Shadows (1987; by V. C. Andrews and Andrew Neiderman)

==== The Audrina Series ====
Initially a stand-alone novel published during Andrews' lifetime, the story takes place in the Mid-Atlantic United States during the 1960s and 1970s. The story features diverse subjects, such as brittle bone disease, rape, posttraumatic stress disorder, and diabetes, in the haunting setting of a Victorian-era mansion near the fictitious River Lyle. A sequel was published 34 years later, to tie in with the Lifetime adaptation of My Sweet Audrina, by Andrew Neiderman.

- My Sweet Audrina (1982; by Andrews)
- Whitefern (2016; by Neiderman)

==== The Casteel Family Series ====
Published between 1985 and 1990, the five novels of the Casteel series make up the last series started by Andrews before her death. This series traces the lives of a troubled West Virginia family, originally from the viewpoint of Heaven, a young impoverished girl whose mother died during childbirth and who has a love/hate relationship with her alcoholic father who eventually sells Heaven and her siblings to make some money. Eventually Heaven leaves to go live with her maternal grandfather at Farthinggale Manor where she discovers the secrets of her mother and who her actual father is. Later novels focus on Heaven's daughter, Annie, with the fifth and final novel centering on Leigh, Heaven's mother.

- Heaven (1985)
- Dark Angel (1986)
- Fallen Hearts (1988; started by Andrews, finished by Neiderman)
- Gates of Paradise (1989; Neiderman)
- Web of Dreams (1990; Neiderman)

=== By Andrew Neiderman ===
==== The Cutler Family Series ====
This series, the first written entirely by Neiderman, covers nearly 80 years of the history of the Cutler family. The first three books, Dawn, Secrets of the Morning, and Twilight's Child, follow the character of Dawn from her childhood to her marriage and subsequent return to the Cutler mansion. Midnight Whispers focuses on Dawn's daughter Christie. Darkest Hour, the last book in the series, goes back in time to focus on Dawn's step-grandmother, Lillian.

- Dawn (1990)
- Secrets of the Morning (1991)
- Twilight's Child (1992)
- Midnight Whispers (1992)
- Darkest Hour (1993)

==== The Landry Family Series ====
This series of novels focuses on the Landry family: Ruby Landry, her daughter Pearl, and Ruby's mother Gabrielle (referred to as Gabriel in Tarnished Gold). The novels, set in the Louisiana bayou, were published between 1994 and 1996.

- Ruby (1994)
- Pearl in the Mist (1994)
- All That Glitters (1995)
- Hidden Jewel (1995)
- Tarnished Gold (1996)

==== The Logan Family Series ====
The series follows Melody Logan from a West Virginia trailer park to Cape Cod as she helps her relatives deal with the problems they'd rather bury. Melody stars as the main character in Melody, Heart Song, and Unfinished Symphony. The fourth book, Music in the Night, tells the tale of Melody's cousin, Laura, who died before the events of the first book. The fifth book, Olivia, serves as a prequel, with the main character being Melody's great-aunt Olivia.

- Melody (1996)
- Heart Song (1997)
- Unfinished Symphony (1997)
- Music in the Night (1998)
- Olivia (1999)

==== The Orphans Miniseries ====
The Orphans series focuses on the lives of four teenage orphans, Janet (Butterfly), Crystal, Brooke, and Raven, who are sent to the Lakewood House foster home and their subsequent escape in the full-length conclusion, Runaways. Each of the first four mini-books focuses on the events that led each girl to the Lakewood House foster home. Released over the summer of 1998, The Orphans Series marked the first mini-series written under the Andrews name and the first departure from the usual series structure of the previous five series. An omnibus edition of the first four novels was released in 2000 and the original mini-books were subsequently taken out of print.

- Butterfly (1998)
- Crystal (1998)
- Brooke (1998)
- Raven (1998)
- Runaways (1998)
- Orphans (2000; omnibus)

==== The Wildflowers Miniseries ====
The Wildflowers series is about a group of girls in court-ordered group therapy and why they were ordered to attend. The first four mini-books serve as prequels to the therapy sessions while the last one deals with what happened after. An omnibus edition was released in 2001 containing the four mini-books.

- Misty (1999)
- Star (1999)
- Jade (1999)
- Cat (1999)
- Into the Garden (1999)
- The Wildflowers (2001; omnibus)

==== The Hudson Family Series ====
The Hudson series tells the story of Rain Arnold Hudson, a child conceived in an interracial affair between a black man and a wealthy white woman. Her story is told in Rain, Lightning Strikes, and Eye of the Storm. The fourth book, The End of the Rainbow, is the story of her daughter Summer. The series had ended with only four books until a prequel, titled Gathering Clouds, was announced. The book was released alongside the movie adaptation of Rain and revealed the story of Rain's birth mother.

- Rain (2000)
- Lightning Strikes (2000)
- Eye of the Storm (2000)
- The End of the Rainbow (2001)
- Gathering Clouds (2007, contained within the Rain movie DVD, released on May 29, 2007)

==== The Shooting Stars Series ====
The Shooting Stars series tells the stories of four girls, each with a different background, upbringing, and talent. The first four books each focus on one of the girls: Cinnamon, an actress who deals with her domineering grandmother; Ice, a vocalist whose mother wishes she'd never had a daughter; Rose, a dancer who deals with the ramifications of her father's suicide; and Honey, a violinist whose grandfather sees sin in everything. The final book is Falling Stars, told from Honey's point of view, in which the four girls meet at the Senetsky School for the Arts in New York, where they try to uncover the secrets of their instructor, Madame Senetsky.

- Cinnamon (2001)
- Ice (2001)
- Rose (2001)
- Honey (2001)
- Falling Stars (2001)
- Shooting Stars (2002; omnibus)

==== The De Beers Family Series ====
The De Beers family series tells the story of Willow De Beers, who learns from her father's diary that her real mother had been a patient of her father's. The first two books, Willow and Wicked Forest, cover her meeting with her mother and half-brother in Palm Beach, Florida, her marriage which ends on a sour note, and the birth of her daughter Hannah, who is the main character in Twisted Roots. Into the Woods is the first prequel to the series about Grace, Willow's mother, and what led to her being admitted to the hospital. Hidden Leaves and Dark Seed are both told from the perspective of Willow's father, Claude, and tell how he met Grace and how Willow was born. Some novels in the De Beers series feature letters from characters from other V. C. Andrews novels, such as Ruby Landry and Annie Stonewall.

- Willow (2002)
- Wicked Forest (2002)
- Twisted Roots (2002)
- Into the Woods (2003)
- Hidden Leaves (2003)
- Dark Seed (2001; an e-book included with Hidden Leaves)

==== The Broken Wings Series ====
The Broken Wings series follows three juvenile delinquents, Robin Taylor, Teal Sommers, and Phoebe Elder, who each act out for various reasons. They are sent to Dr. Foreman's School for Girls, run by the abusive Dr. Foreman, in an isolated part of the Southwest.

- Broken Wings (2003)
- Midnight Flight (2003)

==== The Gemini Series ====
The Gemini series follows Celeste, a young girl who is forced to take on the identity of her dead twin brother Noble by her New Age fanatic mother. Celeste's story is followed in Celeste and Black Cat. The third book, Child of Darkness, is about Celeste's daughter Baby Celeste.

- Celeste (2004)
- Black Cat (2004)
- Child of Darkness (2005)

==== The Shadows Series ====
The Shadows series is about a teenage girl named April Taylor, who is short, fat, not overly talented, nor popular. The first book focuses on April's relationship with her athletic older sister Brenda and the deaths of their parents. The second book focuses on April's adventures after moving in with a foster family in California.

- April Shadows (2005)
- Girl in the Shadows (2006)

==== The Early Spring Series ====
The only novel from "The V. C. Andrews Trust" (through which Neiderman wrote the novels that followed Andrews's death) to feature a little girl throughout the book. Jordan March, unlike every other V. C. Andrews main character (all of whom are 12 or 16 years old), starts out at age 6, then turns 7. This little girl is developing too fast.

- Broken Flower (2006)
- Scattered Leaves (2007)

==== The Secrets Series ====
The series follows the story of two small-town girls, a murder, and the attic they use and develop into something very special. According to Neiderman, both books in the series were "slightly inspired by a true story".

- Secrets in the Attic (2007)
- Secrets in the Shadows (2008)

==== The Delia Series ====
The Delia series revolves around a young Latina girl (Delia), whose parents died in a truck accident in Mexico, and how she must cope with fitting into her aunt's wealthy and sometimes cruel Mexican-American family.

- Delia's Crossing (September 2008)
- Delia's Heart (December 2008)
- Delia's Gift (February 2009)

==== The Heavenstone Series ====
- Heavenstone Secrets (2009)
- Secret Whispers (March 2010)

==== The Kindred Series ====
- Daughter of Darkness (2010)
- Daughter of Light (2012)

==== The March Family Series ====
- Family Storms (2011)
- Cloudburst (2011)

==== The Forbidden Series ====
- The Forbidden Sister (2013)
- The Forbidden Heart [e-book] (2013)
- Roxy's Story (2013)

==== The Diary Series ====
- Christopher's Diary: Secrets of Foxworth (2014)
- Christopher's Diary: Echoes of Dollanganger (2015)
- Secret Brother (2015)

==== The Mirror Sisters Series ====
- The Mirror Sisters (2016)
- Broken Glass (2017)
- Shattered Memories (2017)

==== The Girls of Spindrift Series ====
This is a spin-off series from Bittersweet Dreams published in e-book form.

- Corliss (2017)
- Donna (2017)
- Mayfair (2018)
- Spindrift (2018)

==== The House of Secrets Series ====
- House of Secrets (2018)
- Echoes in the Walls (2018)
- Whispering Hearts (2020)

==== The Attic Series ====
Set before the events of the Dollanganger series, the Attic series follows the first Corrine and her marriage to Garland Foxworth.

- Beneath the Attic (2019)
- Out of the Attic (2020)
- Shadows of Foxworth (2020)

==== The Umbrella Series ====
- The Umbrella Lady (2021)
- Out of the Rain (2021)

==== The Eden Series ====
- Eden's Children (2022)
- Little Paula (2023)

==== The Sutherland Series ====
- Losing Spring (2023)
- Chasing Endless Summer (2024)
- Dreaming of Autumn Skies (October 1, 2024)

== Other works ==
=== Stand-alone works by V. C. Andrews ===
- Gods of Green Mountain (1972), a science fiction novel currently only available in e-book format.
- The Obsessed (2022; excerpt only), released as part of Neiderman's biography of Andrews.

=== By Andrew Neiderman ===
- Into the Darkness (2012)
- Capturing Angels (2012)
- The Unwelcomed Child (2014)
- Bittersweet Dreams (2015)
- Sage's Eyes (2016)
- The Silhouette Girl (2019)
- Whispering Hearts (2020)
- Becoming My Sister (2022)
- Birdlane Island (February 25, 2025)

=== Short stories (by Andrew Neiderman and inspired by Andrews's artwork) ===
- "Cage of Love" (2001)
- "The Little Psychic" (2001)

== Non-fiction ==
- The V.C. Andrews Trivia and Quiz Book (1994), by Spignesi, Stephen J. ISBN 9780451179258
- V.C. Andrews: A Critical Companion (1996), by Huntley, E.D. ISBN 9780313294488
- V.C. Andrews: A Reader's Checklist and Reference Guide (1999), by Checker Bee Publishing, ISBN 9781585980062
- V.C. Andrews: Her Life and Books (2010), by Rasmussen, Dana, ISBN 1170063640
- The Woman Beyond the Attic: The Virginia Andrews Story (2022), by Andrew Neiderman ISBN 1982182636

== Film adaptations ==
- Flowers in the Attic (New World Pictures, 1987) [uncredited cameo as the window-washing maid]
- Rain (Code Black Entertainment, 2006) [novel written by Neiderman]

== Television adaptations ==
As of July 2023, Lifetime has aired 19 adaptations of V. C. Andrews' work.

=== The Dollanganger Family Series ===
- Flowers in the Attic (2014)
- Petals on the Wind (2014)
- If There Be Thorns (2015)
- Seeds of Yesterday (2015)
- Flowers in the Attic: The Origin (2022; four-part limited series based on the novel Garden of Shadows)

=== The Casteel Family Series ===
- Heaven (2019)
- Dark Angel (2019)
- Fallen Hearts (2019)
- Gates of Paradise (2019)
- Web of Dreams (2019)

=== The Landry Family Series ===
- Ruby (2021)
- Pearl in the Mist (2021)
- All That Glitters (2021)
- Hidden Jewel (2021)

=== The Cutler Family Series ===
- Dawn (2023)
- Secrets of the Morning (2023)
- Twilight's Child (2023)
- Midnight Whispers (2023)

=== Stand-alone movies ===
- My Sweet Audrina (2016)
