= Andrew Neiderman =

American writer

- Born: October 26, 1940 (age 85); Brooklyn, New York, U.S.
- Writing career
- Language: English
- Genres: Fiction, gothic horror, screenwriting

Andrew Neiderman (born October 26, 1940) is an American novelist. In 1987, he became the ghost writer for V. C. Andrews following her death in 1986. He formerly taught English at Fallsburg Jr./Sr. High School, in upstate New York.

Neiderman is arguably best known as the author of The Devil's Advocate, later adapted into a film starring Keanu Reeves, Al Pacino, and Charlize Theron, and directed by Taylor Hackford. Neiderman also adapted the novel Rain into a film, based on a series of novels released under the name of V.C. Andrews.

Neiderman wrote the stage adaptation of Flowers in the Attic based on the novel by V.C. Andrews, published online in 2014. The world premiere was produced in New Orleans, Louisiana, in August 2015 by See 'Em On Stage: A Production Company and was directed by Christopher Bentivegna.

Neiderman has written the libretto for a musical stage adaptation of The Devil's Advocate.

He also co-authored the screenplay for Duplicates, a USA Network cable movie, and has had six of his other novels adapted into films.

With the publication of Guardian Angel by Dorchester Publishers in January 2010, Neiderman has, between his V. C. Andrews novels and those under his name, had over 130 published novels.

A resident of Palm Springs, California, Neiderman was honored with a Golden Palm Star on the Palm Springs Walk of Stars on October 17, 1997.

== Novels ==
This list of novels does not include works by Neiderman ghostwritten as by "the V. C. Andrews Trust".

- Illusion (1967)
- Sisters (1972)
- Weekend (1980) (with Tania Grossinger)
- Pin (1981) (adapted as a film in 1988)
- Brainchild (1981)
- Someone's Watching (1983)
- Tender, Loving Care (1984) (adapted as an interactive movie in 1997)
- Imp (1985)
- Child's Play (1985)
- Love Child (1986)
- Reflection (1986)
- Teacher's Pet (1986)
- Night Howl (1986)
- Sight Unseen (1987)
- Playmates (1987)
- The Maddening (1987) (adapted as a film in 1995)
- Surrogate Child (1988)
- Perfect Little Angels (1989) (filmed in 1998 by director Timothy Bond)
- The Devil's Advocate (1990) (filmed in 1997 by director Taylor Hackford)
- Bloodchild (1990)
- The Immortals (1991)
- The Need (1992)
- Sister, Sister (1992)
- The Solomon Organization (1993)
- After Life (1993)
- Angel of Mercy (1994)
- Duplicates (1994) (filmed in 1991 by director Sandor Stern)
- Thirsty (1995)
- The Dark (1997)
- In Double Jeopardy (1998)
- Neighborhood Watch (1999)
- Curse (2000)
- Zombies (2000)
- Amnesia (2001)
- Dead Time (2002)
- Under Abduction (2002)
- The Baby Squad (2003)
- Deficiency (2004)
- The Hunted (2005)
- Finding Satan (2006)
- Unholy Birth (2007)
- Life Sentence (2007)
- Deadly Verdict (2008)
- Guardian Angel (2010)
- Garden of the Dead (2011)
- Lost in His Eyes (2015)
- Undercover Lovers (2022)
