= List of Guiding Light cast members =

This is a list of actors and actresses who have had roles on the soap opera Guiding Light.

Originally a radio drama series, by the early 1980s, Guiding Light was CBS's main contender challenging ABC's dominance of the daytime television soap opera ratings.

Major characters and cast members over the years have included Roger Thorpe (Michael Zaslow); Nola Reardon (Lisa Brown); Reva Shayne (Kim Zimmer); and Beth Raines (Beth Chamberlin).

== Cast members ==
Actor	Character	Duration
Mary Kay Adams	India von Halkein	1984–87, 1990, 1998–99, 2002, 2005
Timothy Adams	Rob Layne	2000
Anthony Addabbo	Jim LeMay	1999–2000
Nancy Addison	Kit Vested	1969–74
Grant Aleksander	Phillip Spaulding	1982–84, 1986–91, 1996–2004, 2009
Millette Alexander	Sara McIntyre	1968–83
George Alvarez	Ray Santos	1999–2009
Terrell Anthony	Rusty Shayne	1986–90, 1996–2000, 2002, 2005–06
Nicholas Reese Art	Zach Spaulding	2002–09
Kevin Bacon	TJ Werner	1980–81
David Bailey	Alan Spaulding	1979
Scott Bailey	Sandy Foster	2003–06
Hayley Barr	Harley Cooper	1999, 2001–02
Patricia Barry	Sally Gleason	1983–87
Murray Bartlett	Cyrus Foley	2007–09
Frank Beaty	Brent Lawrence	1995–96
Gregory Beecroft	Tony Reardon	1981–85
Nancy Bell	Susan Bates Spaulding	1995–96
Paulo Benedeti	Jesse Blue	1997–2000
Fran Bennett	Mrs. Matson	1965-66
Barbara Berjer	Barbara Norris Thorpe	1971–81, 1995–96
Christopher Bernau	Alan Spaulding	1977–84, 1986–88
Jack Betts	John Cutler	1987
Richard Biggs	Clayton Boudreux	2001–02
David Bishins	Daniel St. John	1990–92
Tammy Blanchard	Drew Jacobs	1997–2000
Hunt Block	Ben Warren	1997–2000
Robert Bogue	A.C. Mallet	2005–09
John Bolger	Phillip Spaulding	1985–86
Matthew Bomer	Ben Reade	2001–03
BethAnn Bonner	Natasha	2009
John Boruff	Henry Benedict	1962–66
Jeff Branson	Alan Spaulding	2004
Jeff Branson	Shayne Lewis	2008–09
Joseph Breen	Will Jeffries	1987–89
Kim Brockington	Felicia Boudreau	2002–09
Eric Brooks	Louie Darnell	1983–86
Kimberly J. Brown	Marah Lewis	1993–98, 2006
Lisa Brown	Nola Chamberlain	1980–85, 1995–98, 2009
Ryan Brown	Bill Lewis III	1998–2001
Lydia Bruce	Alexandra Spaulding	1984
Mandy Bruno	Marina Cooper	2004–09
Edward Bryce	Bill Bauer	1959-1963, 1965-1969, 1977-1978, 1983
Rebecca Budig	Michelle Bauer	1995–98
Bryan Buffington	Bill Lewis III	1989–98
William Bumiller	Sean McCullough	1998–99
Laura Bell Bundy	Marah Lewis	1999–2001
Gregory Burke	Ben Reade	1989–96
Warren Burton	Warren Andrews	1983–87
Nadia Capone	Francesca Vizzini	1991
Jean Carol	Nadine Cooper Lewis	1988–95, 2003, 2006
James Carroll	A.C. Mallet	1991–92
Orlagh Cassidy	Doris Wolfe	1999–2009
Beth Chamberlin	Beth Raines	1989–91, 1997–2009
Crystal Chappell	Olivia Spencer	1999–2009
Keith Christopher	Wyatt Sanders	1995–96
Thom Christopher	Colonel Dax	2001-02
Carolyn Ann Clark	Lesley Ann Monroe	1981–84
Marsha Clark	Hillary Bauer	1978–84
Jordan Clarke	Tim Ryan	1974–76
Jordan Clarke	Billy Lewis	1983–86, 1989–93, 1996–2009
Tyra Colar	Leah Bauer	2008–09
Bradley Cole	Richard Winslow	1999–2003
Bradley Cole	Jeffrey O'Neill	2003–09
Signy Coleman	Annie Dutton	1998–99, 2003
Signy Coleman	Teri DeMarco	1999
Joan Collins	Alexandra Spaulding	2002
Zach Conroy	James Spaulding	2009
Jennifer Cooke	Morgan Richards	1981–83
Jeanne Cooper	Cecilia	2009
Daniel Cosgrove	Bill Lewis	2002–05, 2007–09
Suzy Cote	Samantha Marler	1989–92
Amy Cox Ecklund	Abigail Blume Bauer	1995–2000
Barbara Crampton	Mindy Lewis	1993–95
Carey Cromelin	Wanda Hite	2009
Veronica Cruz	Gabriella Lopez	1994–95
Kathleen Cullen	Amanda Spaulding	1979–83, 1987
John Cunningham	Welles Carrera	1987-89
Russell Curry	David Grant	1995–96
Augusta Dabney	Barbara Norris	1970
Robert Danza Jr.	Jude Bauer	2007–08
Patti D'Arbanville	Selena Davis	1998–2000
Allison Daugherty	Rae Rooney	1989–90
Justin Deas	Buzz Cooper	1993–2009
Ruby Dee	Martha Frazier	1967
Lynn Deerfield	Holly Reade	1970–76
Michael Dempsey	Alan-Michael Spaulding	2005–07
Elizabeth Dennehy	Blake Marler	1988–89
Sandy Dennis	Alice Holden	1956
Bonnie Dennison	Daisy Lemay	2007–09
Leslie Denniston	Maeve Stoddard	1985–88
Kassie DePaiva	Chelsea Reardon	1986–91
Mark Derwin	A.C. Mallet	1990–93
Frank Dicopoulos	Frank Cooper	1987–2009
Olivia Dicopoulos	Maureen Reardon	2009
Michael Dietz	Alan-Michael Spaulding	1996–97
Taye Diggs	Adrian "Sugar" Hill	1997
Colleen Dion-Scotti	Ramona Hendon	2003
Mark Dobies	Noah Chase	2000–01
Ellen Dolan	Maureen Bauer	1982–86
Aubrey Dollar	Marina Cooper	2001–04
Suzzanne Douglas	Peggy	1986
Keir Dullea	Mark Jarrett	1986
Marj Dusay	Alexandra Spaulding	1993–99, 2002–09
Hilary Edson	Eve Guthrie	1992–95
Beth Ehlers	Harley Cooper	1987–93, 1997–2008
Taina Elg	Dr. Ingrid Fischer	1980
Jane Elliot	Carrie Todd Marler	1981–82
Morgan Englund	Dylan Lewis	1989–95, 1997, 1999, 2002, 2004, 2006, 2009
Ethan Erickson	J. Chamberlain	1996–98
Carl T. Evans	Alan-Michael Spaulding	1987–90
Judi Evans	Beth Raines	1983–86
Scott Evans	Trey	2008
Geoffrey C. Ewing	Griffin Williams	1995–98
Joel Fabiani	Roger Thorpe	1991–92, 1994–95
Kristi Ferrell	Roxie Shayne	1984–88
Frances Fisher	Suzette Saxon	1985–86
Arielle Fleischer	Clarissa Marler	2006–08
Calista Flockhart	Elise	1989
Michelle Forbes	Sonni Carrera	1987–89
Michelle Forbes	Solita Carrera	1988–89
Nicole Forester	Cassie Layne Winslow	2005–08
Peter Francis James	Clayton Boudreau	2003–09
Paula Garces	Pilar Santos	1999–2001
Maureen Garrett	Holly Lindsey Reade	1976–80, 1988–2006, 2009
Brian Gaskill	Dylan Lewis	2007–08
Jennifer Gatti	Dinah Marler	1986–87
Stephanie Gatschet	Tammy Winslow Randall	2002–08
Jeff Gendelman	Matt Weiss	1990–91
Robert Gentry	Ed Bauer	1966–69, 1997–98
Thomas Gibson	Peter Latham	1987
Patrick Gilbert	Robbie Santos	2009
Ricky Paull Goldin	Gus Aitoro	2001–08
James Goodwin	Johnny Bauer	1986–90
Nicolette Goulet	Meredith Reade	1987–89
Micki Grant	Helen Tynan	1982
James Michael Gregary	Jory Andros	1992–94
Janet Grey	Eve McFarren	1976–82
Frank Grillo	Hart Jessup	1996–99
Kathryn Hall	Emma Spaulding	2004–07
Ann Hamilton	Mindy Lewis	1993
Jay Hammer	Fletcher Reade	1984–99, 2009
Jennifer Harmon	Jean Wetherill	1991
Kate Harrington	Marion Conway	1971–72
Aaron Hart	Jude Bauer	2005–07
Melissa Hayden	Bridget Reardon Lewis	1991–97, 2009
Kathryn Hays	Leslie Jackson Bauer	1971
Rick Hearst	Alan-Michael Spaulding	1990–96
Peter Hermann	Michael Burke	1997–98
Marshall Hilliard	Hart Jessup	1995–96
Elizabeth Hobgood	Mary Murto	2000–01
Rebecca Hollen	Trish Lewis	1981–85, 1997, 2002
Ellen Holly	Judge Frances Collier	1988-93
Patrick Horgan	Neil Blake	1981-82
David S. Howard	Dutch Blazer	1986
Roger Howarth	Jory Andros	1992
Scott Hoxby	Patrick Cutter	1993–95
Elizabeth Hubbard	Anne Benedict Fletcher	1962
Mart Hulswit	Ed Bauer	1969–81
Crystal Hunt	Lizzie Spaulding	2003–06
Doug Hutchison	Sebastian Hulce	2004–05
Fiona Hutchison	Tanya	1985
Fiona Hutchison	Jenna Bradshaw	1992–94, 1996–98, 2006, 2009
Brody Hutzler	Zachary Smith	1996–97
Vincent Irizarry	Brandon "Lujack" Luvonaczek	1983–85, 1989
Vincent Irizarry	Nick McHenry Spaulding	1991–96, 1998
Allison Janney	Ginger	1993–95
Jessica Jimenez	Catalina Quesada	2000–02
James Earl Jones	Jim Frazier	1966
Melina Kanakaredes	Eleni Cooper	1991–95
Alexa Kaplan	Sarah Randall	2006–09
Lenore Kasdorf	Rita Bauer	1975–81
Billy Kay	Shayne Lewis	2000–03
Elizabeth Keifer	Blake Marler	1992–2009
Maeve Kinkead	Vanessa Chamberlain	1980–87, 1989–2000, 2002, 2005–09
Harley Jane Kozak	Annabelle Sims Reardon	1983–85
Nina Landey	Cassie Lawrence	1995–96
Joe Lando	Macaulay West	1993
Sophia Landon	Diane Ballard	1977–81
William Lanning	Cain Harris	1986
Lisby Larson	Calla Matthews	1985–86
Elizabeth Lawrence	Bess Lowell	1993–94
Lee Lawson	Bea Reardon	1981-90
Sharon Leal	Dahlia Crede	1996–99
Christian LeBlanc	Wedding guest	2009
Jessica Leccia	Natalia Rivera Aitoro	2007–09
Bethany Joy Lenz	Teenage Dolly	1998
Bethany Joy Lenz	Michelle Bauer Santos	1998–2000
Mark Lewis	Kurt Corday	1985–86
James Lipton	Dick Grant	1953
Nia Long	Kat Speakes	1991–94
Robert LuPone	District Attorney	1989
Robert LuPone	Leo Flynn	1990–97
David Andrew Macdonald	Edmund Winslow	1999–2005, 2008–09
Elizabeth MacRae	Agatha Dobson	1984
Rebecca Mader	Tony's Mystery Woman	2003
Marko Maglich	Johnny "Dub" Taylor	1984–85
Larkin Malloy	Kyle Sampson	1984–87
Kevin Mambo	Marcus Williams	1995–98
Joe Marinelli	Pauly Hardman	1994
Amelia Marshall	Gilly Grant	1989–96
Stephen Martines	Tony Santos	2003–05
John Martinuzzi	David Preston	1985
Robin Mattson	Hope Bauer	1976–77
Lauren C. Mayhew	Marah Lewis	1998–99
MacKenzie Mauzy	Lizzie Spaulding	2000–02
Malachy McCourt	Landlord	1989
Kevin McClatchy	Vinnie Morrison	1993
Sean McDermott	Hart Jessup	1993
Lindsey McKeon	Marah Lewis	2001–04
Kurt McKinney	Matt Reardon	1994–2000, 2005–09
Beverlee McKinsey	Alexandra Spaulding	1984–92
Eddie Mekka	Grady	1993
Johnny Messner	Rob Layne	1998
Rachel Miner	Michelle Bauer	1990–95
Wendy Moniz	Dinah Marler	1995–99
Burke Moses	Briggs	1986
Karla Mosley	Christina Boudreau	2008–09
Kelly Neal	Sid Dickerson	1994–95
Alexandra Neil	Rose McLaren	1987–89
Eric Nelsen	Kevin Ross Marler	2006
Robert Newman	Josh Lewis	1981–84, 1986–91, 1993–2009
Roger Newman	Kenneth Norris	1970–75, 1998–99
Tom Nielsen	Floyd Parker	1980–85
Christopher Norris	Rebecca Nash	1992
Patrick O'Connell	Neil Everest	1989–90
Michael O'Leary	Rick Bauer	1983–91, 1995–2009
Thomas O'Rourke	Justin Marler	1976–83
Michael Palance	Kevin Stanton	1986–88
Petronia Paley	Vivian Grant	1992–99
Hayden Panettiere	Lizzie Spaulding	1996–2000
Ellen Parker	Maureen Bauer	1986–93, 1997, 1999, 2004
Kimi Parks	Dorie Smith	1986–87
Dennis Parlato	Roger Thorpe	1997–98
Ashley Peldon	Marah Lewis	1989–91
Tom Pelphrey	Jonathan Randall	2004–09
Denise Pence	Katie Parker	1977–85
Christopher Pennock	Justin Marler	1990–91
Mary Peterson	Nell Cleary	1995–96
Jeff Phillips	Hart Jessup	1991–92
Cindy Pickett	Jackie Marler	1976–80
Christina Pickles	Linell Conway	1970–72
George Pilgrim	J. Chamberlain	1996
Daniel Pilon	Alan Spaulding	1988–89
Mark Pinter	Mark Evans	1981–83
Mark Pinter	Brad Green	2003–04
Victoria Platt	Vicky Spaulding	1998–2001
Katell Pleven	Dana Jones	1989–90
Toby Poser	Amanda Spaulding	1995–98
Susan Pratt	Claire Ramsey	1983–86, 2000–02
Lizabeth Pritchett	Sophia	1986–87
Juliet Pritner	Suzanne Deveraux	1991–92
Everett Quinton	Keymar	1999
Narlee Rae	Clarissa Marler	2008–09
Ron Raines	Alan Spaulding	1994–2009
Wes Ramsey	Sam Spencer	2000–04, 2008
Heather Rattray	Wendy	1988
James Rebhorn	Bradley Raines	1983–85, 1989
Arielle Renwart	Leah Bauer	2006–09
R.E. Rodgers	Scarface	2001
Gil Rogers	Hawk Shayne	1985–92, 1995–97, 1999, 2002, 2004–06, 2008–09
Jennifer Roszell	Eleni Cooper	1995–2002, 2006, 2009
Sam Rovin	Vasily	1992
Susan Douglas Rubeš	Kathy Grant	1952–58
Emme Rylan	Lizzie Spaulding	2006–09
Katie Sagona	Tammy Winslow	1997–2002
Lawrence Saint-Victor	Remy Boudreau	2006–09
Saundra Santiago	Carmen Santos	1999–2003
Sonia Satra	Lucy Cooper Spaulding	1993–97
Sam Schacht	Brody	1984
Stefan Schnabel	Dr. Stephen Jackson	1965-1981
Geoffrey Scott	Billy Lewis	1993–94
Jocelyn Seagrave	Julie Camaletti	1991–94
Drew Seeley	Andrew	2000
Monti Sharp	David Grant	1992–95
John Wesley Shipp	Kelly Nelson	1980–84
Kimberley Simms	Mindy Lewis	1989–92, 1997
Peter Simon	Ed Bauer	1981–84, 1986–96, 2002–04, 2009
Bret Shuford	Flight Captain	2005
Tina Sloan	Lillian Raines	1983–2009
Michelle Ray Smith	Ava Peralta	2005–09
Jimmy Smits	unknown character	1983
Brittany Snow	Susan 'Daisy' Lemay	1998–2001
Jesse Soffer	Max Nickerson	1999
Mira Sorvino	Julie Camaletti	1992
Gillian Spencer	Robin Lang	1964–67
Rebecca Staab	Jessie Matthews	1985–87
Leonard Stabb	Hart Jessup	1993
Nancy St. Alban	Michelle Santos	2000–05, 2009
Laura Stepp	Cassie Layne Winslow	2001
Don Stewart	Mike Bauer	1968–1984, 1997
Paul Anthony Stewart	Danny Santos	1998–2005, 2009
Sherry Stringfield	Blake Marler	1989–92
Anna Stuart	Vanessa Chamberlain	1981
William Bell Sullivan	Gary Swanson	1989–90
Cally & Brooke Tarleton	Hope Santos	2009
Josh Taylor	Quint Chamberlain	1996
Krista Tesreau	Mindy Lewis	1983–89, 2002, 2004, 2009
Shawn Thompson	Simon Hall	1985–87
Terrell Tilford	David Grant	1998–2001
Gina Tognoni	Dinah Marler	2004–09
Jacqueline Tsirkin	Emma Spaulding	2008–09
Paige Turco	Dinah Marler	1987–89
Michael Tylo	Quint Chamberlain	1981–85, 1996–97
Caitlin Van Zandt	Ashlee Wolfe	2006–09
Jerry verDorn	Ross Marler	1979–2005
Jerry verDorn	Todd MacKenzie	1982
Jerry verDorn	Hoss	1994
Kristen Vigard	Morgan Richards	1980–81
Jordi Vilasuso	Tony Santos	2000–03
Richard Van Vleet	Ed Bauer	1984–86
Helen Wagner	Trudy Palmer	1952
Christopher Walken	Mike Bauer	1954–56
Marcy Walker	Tangie Hill	1993–95
Tonja Walker	Marie Green	2003–04
Burt Ward	Himself	2008
Cynthia Watros	Annie Dutton	1994–98
Paul Wesley	Max Nickerson	1999–2001
Adam West	Himself	2008
Marty West	Shayne Lewis	2003–04
Renauld White	William Reynolds	1986-92
Tom Wiggin	Sam Kershaw	1999
Michael Wilding Jr.	Jackson Freemont	1985–87
Billy Dee Williams	Jim Frazier	1966
Darnell Williams	Griggs	2007
Karen Williams	Vicky Spaulding	1998
Miles Williams	R.J. Jessup	2004–09
Vince Williams	Hampton Speakes	1989–96
Sherilyn Wolter	George	1993
Michael Woods	Jim Reardon	1983–85
Max Wright	Kevin Dawson	1992–98
Laura Wright	Cassie Layne Winslow	1997–2005
Ramy Zada	Jeffrey Morgan	1997–98
Michael Zaslow	Roger Thorpe	1971–80, 1989–97
Ian Ziering	Cameron Stewart	1986–88
Stephen Zinnato	Nolan	2001–04
Kim Zimmer	Reva Shayne	1983–90, 1995–2009
Kim Zimmer	Dolly Shayne	1998
Jessica Zutterman	Alan-Michael Spaulding	1981–83
