= Guiding Light (1980–1989) =

American television soap opera

Guiding Light (GL) is a long-running American television soap opera. This article covers the show in the 1980s.

== Production and writing ==
The 1980s was a time of many transitions and many firsts for the show.

In 1980 Jerome and Bridget Dobson, the head writers of Guiding Light since 1975, left to become the head writers of sister soap As the World Turns, and were replaced by Douglas Marland. Marland, a former actor who had appeared on As the World Turns years earlier, had been part of several other writing teams, including a stint working under head writer Harding Lemay at Another World. Marland had great success at General Hospital before joining GL in January 1980.

As head writer, Marland focused on core families and characters, and developed several new characters, tying them to existing characters. He added the Reardon family, most notably vixen Nola Reardon, played by Lisa Brown. He added levels of intrigue and mystery to the show, and also focused story on young characters.

In May 1980, Guiding Light won its first Daytime Emmy for Outstanding Achievement in a Daytime Drama.

In 1981, Procter & Gamble changed the opening of Guiding Light to keep up with the more youth-oriented ABC soaps, from the opening used since 1975 of a tree with sunlight shining through to a disco opening (with scenes of characters or groups of characters in several action shots) with a theme from Jack Urbont, known informally as the "disco" theme. This opening was used until August 1983.

Marland left GL in 1982 due to a dispute regarding the Carrie Marler multiple personality disorder. Elliot was fired by Allen Potter, and Marland left soon after. Before Marland quit, Guiding Light won its second Daytime Emmy for Outstanding Daytime Drama, for the 1981 – 1982 television season.

After Marland's departure, Procter & Gamble brought in three new head writers in rapid succession, with only the third achieving success. Guiding Light's ratings dropped and the show fell out of the top five in the ratings. From June 1982 to November 1983, many of the stories shown became contrived, and some became very convoluted for many audience members. The first two head writers brought in, Pat Falken Smith and L. Virginia Browne tried to bring to a close to many of the storylines started late in Marland's term as head writer.

A replacement headwriter was found in Pam Long (who originally started writing in fall 1983 with Richard Culliton). Long was an actress who had appeared on the then-recently canceled Procter & Gamble soap opera Texas and, in an unusual move, was given the head writer reins of that show during its last months. At Guiding Light, she eventually clashed with CBS and Procter & Gamble executives who resisted her idea of introducing a Jewish family, the Weisses, to Springfield. With the rejection by Procter & Gamble and CBS of her idea for this new core family, Long left the show in early 1991. The only Weiss to ever be introduced to the canvas was Matt Weiss—and he only appeared for a couple of months in early 1991.

During the 1980s, a number of new families were introduced, including the Lewises, who would eventually become one of the central families on GL, the working class Reardons and, toward the end of the decade, the Coopers. A number of longtime cast members departed, including Millette Alexander (Sara McIntyre) and Robert Milli (Adam Thorpe), and their characters were phased out. Vixen/heroine Rita Bauer was written out when Lenore Kasdorf left the show in July 1981; Kasdorf had been so popular in the part that producers decided against recasting the role and left the door open for a possible return by hinting that Rita left pregnant with soon-to-be ex-husband Ed Bauer's or ex-lover Alan Spaulding's baby. Charita Bauer, who'd played Bauer family matriarch Bert Bauer since the show's radio days, died in 1985.

On August 22, 1983, the disco opening was jettisoned in favor of a slower, more romantic Rob Mounsey-composed "My Guiding Light", originally in a full-orchestrated arrangement, to visuals of the characters in various clips from the show. The "My Guiding Light" tune was used for the remainder of the 1980s, the orchestrated version was eventually replaced by a faster-paced version featuring synthesizer.

== Executive Producers ==
Guiding Light executive producers
| Name | Years |
|---|---|
| Allen M. Potter | 1975 – October 1982 |
| Gail Kobe | November 1982 – April 1986 |
| Joe Willmore | May 1986 – June 1989 |
| Robert Calhoun | July 1989 – June 1991 |

== Major characters ==
=== The Bauers ===
- Bert Bauer (Charita Bauer, until her death in 1985), character died in March 1986.
- Hillary Bauer (Marsha Clark), Bill Bauer and Simone Kincaid's daughter. Half-sister to both Paul Kincaid and half-sister to Ed and Mike Bauer. Character killed in explosion in September 1984.
- Hope Bauer Spaulding (Elvera Roussel), married Alan Spaulding in February 1980, written out in November 1983.
- Mike Bauer (Don Stewart), written out in September 1984.
- Ed Bauer (Mart Hulswit until August 28, 1981; Peter Simon, September 1, 1981, until September 11, 1984, and again from April 2, 1986, until end of decade; Richard Van Vleet, September 24, 1984, until March 21, 1986).
- Kelly Nelson (John Wesley Shipp), Ed's godson, introduced February 1980, character last seen and actor last aired on January 26, 1984, written out, last mentioned in story line in November 1984 (by Dr. Claire Ramsey)
- Rick Bauer (Phil MacGregor, November 1982 until May 1983; Michael O'Leary, May 26, 1983, until end of decade), Ed and Leslie's SORASed son.
- Michelle Bauer (Rachel Miner – February 23, 1989, to June 13, 1995; Rebecca Budig – November 30, 1995, to November 4, 1998; (Bethany) Joie Lenz (currently known as Bethany Joy Galeotti) – November 5, 1998, to October 4, 2000; Nancy St. Alban – October 27, 2000, to November 22, 2005; July 2, 3 & 13, 2009; September 17, 2009). Ed's biological daughter with Dr. Claire Ramsey, adopted by Maureen, born November 1985.
- Rita Stapleton Bauer (Lenore Kasdorf), Ed's third wife, written out in July 1981.
- Johnny Bauer (James Goodwin, 1986–1990), Ed and Mike's second cousin once removed, third cousin to Rick.
- Lacey Bauer (Zoe Trilling) 1987. Johnnys younger sister. Jack and Lainie's daughter.
- Jack and Lainie Bauer, 1988 (Alan North) & (Teri Keane). Jack was Otto and Myra's only child. Johnny and Lacey Bauer's parents. Mike and Ed's 1st cousin once removed.
- Otto and Myra Bauer, talked about but not seen in 1986. Jack's parents. Papa Frederich Bauer's late brother and sister-in-law. Mentioned again in 1996.
- Karl and Alice Bauer. Talked about but not seen in 1986. The late Mary Bauers' parents. Late brother and sister-in-law of Papa Frederich and Otto Bauer. Mentioned again in 1996.
- Douglas and Ellen Bauer, talked about in 1986, but not seen. Late brother and sister-in-law of Papa Frederich, Otto and Carl Bauer. They had no children. Mentioned again in 1996.
- Dr. Meredith Reade Bauer (Nicolette Goulet, July 1987 until June 1989), Fletcher Reade's sister and Rick's wife; written out.
- Bill Bauer (Ed Bryce, August 3 to 8, 1983), character killed by Eli Sims.
- Meta Bauer White Roberts Banning (Gloria Blondell – June 1948 to September 24, 1948; Dorothy Lovett – September 27, 1948, to August 26, 1949; Jone Allison – September 22, 1949, to November 14, 1952; Ellen Demming – January 5, 1953, to June 30, 1966, and May 1971 to November 22, 1974; Mary Stuart November 22, 1996, to January 29, 2002), Ed and Mike's aunt; sister of Trudy and Bill. Mentioned when Bill Bauer died in 1983. Bert went to take care of an ill Meta in 1984 and later died while visiting her in 1986.
- Trudy Bauer Palmer (Laurette Fillbrandt – September 27, 1948, to September 21, 1949; Charlotte Holland – September 22, 1949, to 1951; Helen Wagner – January to August 22, 1952; Lisa Howard – March 14, 1957, to March 14, 1958. Daughter of Papa Bauer, sister of Bill and Meta. Mentioned when Bill & then Bert Bauer died.
- Paul Kincaid, Victor and Simone Kincaid's son. talked about but not seen. Said to be in Europe with his and half-sister Hillary's mom Simone. Both were unable to attend Hillary's funeral in 1984.
- Victoria Ballenger and Roy Mills, talked about not seen. Died offscreen prior to 1984. In 1984 Rick would mention he never knew his late grandparents.

=== The Spauldings ===
- Alan Spaulding (Chris Bernau until May 31, 1984, and again from May 23, 1986, until June 28, 1988; Daniel Pilon from July 25, 1988, until end of decade), and then Ron Raines until the end of the show, married Hope Bauer in February 1980.
- Elizabeth Spaulding (Lezlie Dalton), written out in November 1981.
- Phillip Spaulding (Jarrod Ross until December 24, 1981; Grant Aleksander from December 22, 1982, until December 28, 1984, and again from December 1986 until end of decade; John Bolger from January 11, 1985, until Summer 1986).
- Amanda Spaulding (Kathleen Cullen until August 12, 1983, Christmas 1987), was known in this decade as the biological daughter of Alan and Jennifer (Jane Marie Stafford) Richards, written out.
- Alan-Michael Spaulding (Carl Tye Evans, July 3, 1987, until end of decade), Alan and Hope's SORASed son, born on-screen on September 23, 1981.
- Baroness Alexandra "Alex" Spaulding von Halkein (Beverlee McKinsey, February 10, 1984, until end of decade), Alan's sister and Brandon's mother.
- Brandon "Lujack" Luvonazcek (Vincent Irizarry, November 28, 1983, to December 6, 1985), Alex's biological son with Eric Luvonazcek, was tricked by Alex's father and Eric to give up shortly after birth, died from injuries sustained in an explosion.
- India von Halkein Spaulding (Mary Kay Adams), August 1, 1984, until April 1987), Alex's stepdaughter, blackmailed Phillip into marriage.
- Brandon Spaulding (John Wardell in flashbacks in 1983, Keith Charles in November 1984), presumed deceased in September 1979, came back from the dead, but died of old age in 1985.
- Victoria Spaulding (Kim Hamilton, Meesha Millington in flashbacks) 1984, Brandon Spaulding and Sharina Tamerlaine's daughter.
- Sharina Tamerlaine (Janet League) 1984, Brandon's mistress and mother of his daughter Victoria in Barbados. Died of old age alongside Brandon in 1985.
- Conrad Tamerlaine, (Willie Carpenter in flashbacks), Uncle of Victoria and brother of Sharina who was shot and killed by Penelope Spaulding who was trying to kill Sharina on founders day in 1944 in Springfield in a cottage that viewed the Spaulding Summer Estate that years later was bought by Tony and Annabelle Reardon.
- Penelope Spaulding (Joanne Camp in flashbacks), Mother of Alexandra and Alan. Accidentally shot and killed Conrad while aiming for Sharina. Died soon after while giving birth to Alan.
- Dorie Smith von Halkein (Kimi Parks, June 1986 until Spring 1987), adopted by India. One-time foster sister of Dinah Chamberlain.
- Simon Hall (Shawn Thompson, January 2, 1986, until April 1987), Lujack's half-brother via their father Eric Luvonazcek and the late Margaret Hall.
- Vera (Frances Foster), 1985 until end of decade, Alexandra's personal maid. Eventually retires and leaves town in 1995.

=== The Norrises/Thorpes ===
- Barbara Norris Thorpe (Barbara Berjer), written out in December 1981. She made a brief appearance at Philip and Blake's wedding in 1989 and later returned in the mid 1990s on a recurring basis.
- Andrew "Andy" Norris (now played by Ted LePlat), taken to prison on August 28, 1981. Released from prison prior to Holly returning in 1988. Whereabouts unknown.
- Holly Norris Bauer Thorpe Lindsey (Maureen Garrett), married to Ed, Roger and Deitrich Lindsey, written out on September 26, 1980; returned on December 23, 1988.
- Roger Thorpe AKA Adam Malik (Michael Zaslow), son of Adam and Marjorie, character killed off on April 1, 1980, came back from the dead on February 15, 1989, stayed until end of decade.
- Adam Thorpe (Robert Milli), married Dr. Sara McIntyre in early 1981, ceased appearing on August 31, 1981 (though was frequently mentioned until 1983, when he and Sara were said to have moved to Oregon); came back briefly in Spring 1989 and June 1994.
- Dr. Sara McIntyre Thorpe (Millette Alexander), Adam's third wife, left town with him in 1983, moving to Oregon (the two were said to have later divorced), written out on December 24, 1982.
- Blake Thorpe Spaulding, originally known as Christina or Chrissie Bauer (Cheryl Lynn Brown until September 26, 1980; Elizabeth Dennehy, May 1988 until June 27, 1989; Sherry Stringfield, July 21, 1989, until end of decade), daughter of Holly and Roger, stepdaughter of Ed Bauer and Dietrich Lindsey.
- Dietrich Lindsey (talked about but never seen).
- Janet Mason Norris (Ken Norris's ex-wife) and their daughter Emily Norris mentioned but never seen. It was said that Barbara was to have visited them off screen several times.
- Ellen Mason, Janet's widowed mother mentioned but not seen. Ellen lived in San Diego with Janet and Emily. Ellen died prior to Barbara Norris returning to Springfield in 1995.

=== The Marlers ===
- Jackie Scott Marler (Cindy Pickett until June 20, 1980; Carrie Mowery, July 21, 1980, until July 1, 1982), character presumably killed off in July 1982.
- Dr. Emmet Scott (Peter Turgeon, January 4-8, 1982, July 7 until December 17, 1982), character killed off.
- Dr. Justin Marler (Tom O'Rourke), written out on September 23, 1983.
- Ross Marler (Jerry verDorn)
- Elaine "Lainie" Marler Bowden (Kathleen Kellaigh), married Carter Bowden in February 1981, character written out at that time. Jackie during her separation from Justin, visited Carter & a pregnant Lainie with her daughter Samantha in 1982. Mentioned to have been contacted when Jackie Marler was presumed dead in a plane crash that same year. Mentioned again in 1983 when Justin and Phillip discussed the Marler family. Mentioned again in 1986 when Ross and Dinah discussed the Marler family. Mentioned by Ross in 1987 to have been divorced and living in Australia.
- Carter Bowden (Alan Austin), written out in February 1981.
- Carrie Todd Marler (Jane Elliot, March 23, 1981, until July 2, 1982), Ross's first wife, written out.
- Samantha Marler (Suzy Cote, February 23, 1989, until end of decade), SORASed daughter of Jackie and Justin, born on-screen in August 1981, biological sister of Phillip.
- Dinah Carter Morgan Marler (Jennifer Gatti, 1986–1987, Paige Turco, 1987–1989), the biological daughter of Ross and Vanessa Chamberlain when Vanessa was a teenager. Adopted by John and Melissa Carter, sister and brother and law to Gordon Matthews (who was married to Lillian's sister Calla, and was Jessie's father). After their deaths, Gordon placed Dinah in an orphanage, and she was later assigned to a foster family, the Morgans. She bonded with foster sister Adele/Dorie. Dinah ran away as a teenager and joined up with circus carnies Joe and Shelley Kowalski.
- Aunt Bernadette (Bunny), died some years prior to the Marler family being introduced. Talked about but not seen. Lainie had lived with Bunny for a while, while growing up. Justin, Ross and Lainie's late mother's older sister.

=== The Reardons ===
- Beatrice "Bea" Foster Reardon (Lee Lawson, introduced in January 1980, appeared off and on until April 1988).
- Nola Reardon Chamberlain (Lisa Brown, introduced in January 1980, appeared until April 25, 1985), Bea's sixth child, married Quinton "Quint" Chamberlain.
- Lana Reardon Cassidy (talked about but not seen), Bea's fifth child. Worked and lived aboard a cruise ship with her son.
- Doug Cassidy (talked about but not seen), husband to Lana Reardon. Doug had died months earlier prior to Nola and Bea being introduced in 1980.
- Jamie Cassidy, talked about but not seen, son of Lana and Doug.
- Hugh Thomas "Tom" Reardon (talked about but not seen, except in flashbacks in 1983 when he was played by Gregory Beecroft), Bea's husband and father of her seven children, killed by Eli Sims in 1963.
- Anthony "Tony" Reardon (Gregory Beecroft, from August 3, 1981, until June 1985), Bea's fourth child.
- Maureen Reardon Bauer (Ellen Dolan, from January 25, 1982, until March 21, 1986, then Ellen Parker from April 2, 1986, until January 11, 1993), Bea's second child, married Dr. Ed Bauer in February 1983, Ed's fourth wife.
- Dr. James "Jim" Reardon (Michael Woods, from December 1, 1983, until February 15, 1985), Bea's oldest child.
- Sean Reardon (talked about but not seen until 1995), Bea's third child.
- Chelsea Reardon (Kassie DePaiva, from November 1986 until January 1991), Bea's youngest child.
- Kelly Louise Parker, later renamed Anastacia "Stacey" Louise Chamberlain, Nola's child with Floyd Parker, later adopted by Quint.
- Annabelle Sims Reardon (Harley Jane Kozak, June 1983 until June 1985), married Tony Reardon in May 1985.
- Katie Parker (Denise Pence), written out in April 1985 after marrying "Long" John Reed. Returned off-screen. Divorced around the time her brother Floyd was arrested and sent to prison in 1985.

=== The Richards/Staffords ===
- Jennifer Richards Evans, aka Jane Marie Stafford (Geraldine Court, April 8, 1980, until February 4, 1983), Amanda's biological mother, written out. Later mentioned by a visiting Amanda in 1987 to have been living in New York with Morgan and Matthew.
- Walter Richards (talked about but not seen), Jennifer's husband, Morgan's father, killed in a car crash.
- Morgan Richards Nelson (Kristen Vigard from April 8, 1980, until August 14, 1981; Jennifer Cooke from August 17, 1981, until May 25, 1983), Jennifer and Walter's daughter, married Dr. Kelly Nelson in August 1981 (later divorced), written out. Later mentioned by her visiting half-sister Amanda Spaulding in 1987 to be living in New York with their mother Jennifer and half-brother Matthew.
- Logan Stafford (Richard Hamilton, 1980–1981), Jane Marie's father, written out. Later referenced in 1987 by his visiting Granddaughter Amanda Spaulding to have died.
- Chet Stafford (Bill Herndon, 1980 until May 26, 1981), Jane Marie's older brother, character killed by the police in May 1981.
- Mark Evans, aka Samuel Pasquin (Mark Pinter), Jennifer's second husband, character killed by fall off a cliff in May 1983.
- Matthew Evans, Jennifer and Mark's son, written out in August 1983. Last mentioned by a visiting Amanda in 1987.
- Janice Stafford, talked about but never seen, died off-screen. Late sister of Jane Marie/Jennifer and Chet, and daughter of Logan Stafford. One-time lover of Alan Spaulding.

=== The Chamberlains ===
- Henry Chamberlain (William Roerick, April 4, 1980, until end of decade), father of Vanessa and Quinton.
- Vanessa Chamberlain Lewis (Maeve Kinkead, June 2, 1980, until August 28, 1981, then February 1, 1982, until December 31, 1987, and then July 14, 1989, until end of decade; Anna Stuart, September until December 1981), daughter of Henry, married Billy Lewis in February 1984.
- Quinton "Quint" Chamberlain (Michael Tylo, October 2, 1981, until April 25, 1985), also known as Quinton R. McCord and Sean Ryan, the biological son of Henry and Stephanie Ryan, Vanessa's half-brother, married Nola Reardon in June 1983, written out.
- Stephanie Ryan (talked about but not seen), Quinton's mother.
- Anthony James Chamberlain (James Anthony Nielsen, son of Nola and Quinton born in May 1984, written out in April 1985.

=== The Lewises/Shaynes/Sampsons ===
- Patricia "Trish" Lewis Norris (Rebecca Hollen, August 1981 until November 1985), divorced from Andy Norris, first child of H.B. Lewis and Miss Martha Lewis, written out.
- Joshua "Josh" Lewis (Robert Newman, October 1, 1981, until December 1984, then from October 1986 until end of decade), second child of H.B. Lewis and Miss Martha Lewis.
- Harlan Billy "Billy" Lewis II (Jordan Clarke, May 24, 1983, until end of decade), biological child of H.B. Lewis and Miss Sally Gleason.
- Harlan Billy "H.B." Lewis I (Larry Gates, August 24, 1983, until end of decade).
- Melinda Sue "Mindy" Lewis Spaulding Corday Jeffries (Krista Tesreau, May 26, 1983, until April 1989; Kimberley Simms, from July 13, 1989, until end of decade), daughter of Billy Lewis and Diana (no maiden name).
- Diana Lewis (talked about but not seen), mother of Mindy.
- Miss Martha Lewis (talked about but not seen), mother of Trish and Josh.
- Reva Shayne Lewis Lewis Spaulding Lewis (Kim Zimmer, November 28, 1983, until end of decade), the self-proclaimed "Slut of Springfield," oldest child of Hawk and Sarah O'Neal Shayne, married Billy Lewis, H.B. Lewis, Alan Spaulding and Josh Lewis. Also romantically involved with Kyle Sampson.
- Miss Sally Gleason (Patricia Barry, October 1983 until October 30, 1987), mother of Billy Lewis and Kyle Sampson, died of a heart attack when she tried to stop the wedding of Josh and Dr. Sonni Carrera.
- Kyle Sampson (Larkin Malloy, December 31, 1984, until January 23, 1987), biological son of Miss Sally Gleason, a former madam, and a priest, named Cardinal John Kyle Malone, written out. Owner of Sampson Industries. Was engaged to Reva Shayne and was once believed to be H.B.'s son. Last anybody heard Kyle was in a coma in a Swiss Clinic in 1987 following a plane crash that killed his fiancée and father.
- Amy Dupree, mentioned but never seen. Kyle's new fiancée. Amy was killed in a plane crash off screen along with Kyle's father Cardinal John Kyle Malone.
- Harlan Billy "Little Bill" Lewis (Bryan Buffington, July 14, 1989), SORASed son of Vanessa and Billy Lewis, born December 1984.
- Roxie Shayne (Kristi Farrell, September 1984 until May 1988), younger sister of Reva.
- Kurt Corday (Mark Lewis), February 1985 to April 1986), second husband of Mindy.
- Hawk Shayne (Gil Rogers, September 1985 to end of decade), father of Reva, Rusty and Roxie.
- Maeve Stoddard Sampson Reade (Leslie Denniston, August 1985 until August 1988), former wife of Kyle Sampson, married Fletcher Reade in 1988, mother of Ben Reade, killed in a helicopter crash.
- Benjamin "Ben" Reade (Gregory Burke, November 29, 1989, until end of decade), biological son of Maeve and Kyle, adopted by Fletcher, born in 1986.
- Sarah O'Neal Shayne (Audrey Peters, January 1987 until end of decade), wife of Hawk, mother of Reva, Rusty and Roxie.
- Russell "Rusty" Shayne (Terrell Anthony, 1986 until end of decade), second child of Sarah and Hawk.
- Dr. Will Jeffries (Joseph Breen, 1987 until October 1989), third husband of Mindy, later annulled, character killed from a fall off a cliff.
- Marah Lewis (Ashley Peldon, November 1988 until April 1991), daughter of Reva and Josh, born 1987.
- Dr. Sonni Welles y Carrera Lewis (Michelle Forbes, October 19, 1987, until November 30, 1989), presumed deceased in October 1986, came back from the dead in 1987, written out, divorced Josh.
- Rose McLaren Shayne (Alexandra Neil, 1988 until May 5, 1989), married Rusty, character killed in a fight with Will Jeffries.
- Dylan Shayne Lewis (Morgan Englund, May 1989 until end of decade), biological son of Reva and Billy.
- Wanda M. Hite (Carey Cromelin), 1985 until end of decade, administrative secretary at Lewis Oil.

=== The Raines ===
- Lillian Raines (Tina Sloan, May 1983 until September 18, 2009).
- Bradley Raines (James Rebhorn, May 1983 until Spring 1985, and in September 1989).
- Beth Raines (Judi Evans, May 1983 until July 1986, then Beth Chamberlin from October 2, 1989, until end of decade), daughter of Lillian and unknown named man, presumed deceased in July 1986, came back from the dead.
- Calla Matthews (Lisby Larson, 1985–1986), Lillian's sister.
- Gordon Matthews, Calla's ex-husband and father to Jesse. Uncle through adoption of Dinah Carter Morgan Chamberlain. Died offscreen in 1991.
- Jesse Matthews (Rebecca Ann Staab, October 1985 until January 1987), Calla and Gordons daughter.
- Simon Hall (Shawn Thompson, January 2, 1986, until April 1987), Lujacks half-brother via their father Eric Luvonazcek and the late Margaret Hall.
- John & Melissa Carter, talked about never seen. Died off camera. Gordon's sister and brother-in-law who adopted the infant Dinah Chamberlain.

=== The Coopers ===
- Harley Davidson Cooper (Beth Ehlers, first began appearing in October 1987).
- Frank Cooper (Frank Dicopoulos, first began appearing in October 1987), Harley's older brother.
- Nadine Corley Cooper (Jean Carol, first began appearing in December 1988), Frank and Harley's mother.
- Buzz Cooper – presumed dead husband of Nadine Cooper, father of Harley and Frank.
- Alan Michael Spaulding – married to Harley Cooper.

=== Other GL characters ===
- Dr. Stephen Jackson (Stefan Schnabel), written out in June 1981, later referred to as having died in Spring 1982.
- Ann Jeffers (Maureen Mooney), written out in April 1982.
- Ben McFarren (Stephen Yates), written out in November 1982.
- Eve Stapleton McFarren (Janet Grey), written out in early 1983.
- Viola Stapleton (Kate Wilkinson), Rita and Eve's mother, written out in 1981.
- Timothy "Tim" Werner (Kevin Bacon, February 1980 until February 1981, Christopher Mercantel, March 1981 until July 1981, Nigel Reed, Fall 1981 until December 1982), written out.
- Dr. Peter Chapman (Curt Dawson), written out in May 1980.
- Dr. Paul La Crosse (Jacques Roux), character killed off in January 1981.
- Diane Ballard (Sofia Landon Geier), character killed in September 1981.
- Lt. Larry Wyatt (Joe Ponazecki)
- Carmen Monvales (Blanca Camacho), written out in September 1980.
- Lucille Wexler (Rita Lloyd), character killed on October 20, 1980.
- Dr. Mark Hamilton (Burton Cooper), character ceased appearing in 1980.
- Neil Blake (Patrick Horgan), written out in January 1983.
- D.A. Clarence Bailey (Larry Weber, 1982–1985 and then again 1987 until end of decade).
- Floyd Parker (Tom Nielson), character went to prison in May 1985.
- Dr. Gonzalo Moreno (Gonzalo Madurga), character killed off in January 1981.
- Dr. Greg Fairbanks (David Greenan), written out in March 1980.
- Dr. Margaret Sedwick (Margaret Gwinver)
- Dr. Renee DuBois (Deborah May), character killed in February 1980.
- Derek Colby (Harley Venton, 1980–1982), written out in October 1982.
- Duke Lafferty (Gary Phillips, 1980–1981), character went to prison.
- Dr. Frank Nelson (Keith Charles, 1980–1981), Kelly's father.
- Joe Bradley (Michael J. Stark, October 1980 until September 1981), character killed in September 1981.
- Trudy Wilson Werner (Amy Steel, 1980–1981), married Tim, ceased appearing.
- Gracie Middleton (Lori Shelle, August 1981 until June 1983), Nola's best friend, written out.
- Lesley Ann Monroe Andrews (Carolyn Ann Clark, October 5, 1981, until May 29, 1984), character killed in May 1984.
- Gunther Lagosi (George Kappazi, October 1981 until March 1983), Quint's assistant, character killed off.
- Mrs. Violet Renfield (Beulah Garrick, October 1981 until June 1983), Quint's former housekeeper, written out.
- Helena Mancini (Rose Alaio, April 1982 until September 1983), written out. She and Justin Marler broke up months before. Samantha Marler returned to Springfield in 1989.
- Ivy Pierce AKA Brenda Lowery (Deborah May, March 1982 until April 1983), written out.
- Silas Crocker (Benjamin Hendrickson, July 1, 1982, until April 1, 1983), character killed off.
- Mona Enright AKA Rebecca Cartwright (Leslie O'Hara, July 1982 until May 1983), character killed off.
- Paulie Amato (Michael Maderiros, 1982 to 1983), written out.
- Helen Tynan (Micki Grant, 1982 to 1984), written out.
- Clay Tynan (Giancarlo Esposito, 1982 to 1983), Helen's adult son, written out.
- Dr. Matt Davenport (James Carroll, 1982 to 1983), written out.
- Jane Hogan (Mary Pat Gleason, 1983 to 1985), written out.
- Warren Andrews (Warren Burton, May 1983 until June 12, 1987), married to Lesley Ann, character went to prison.
- Dr. Claire Ramsey Jarrett (Susan Pratt, Spring 1983 until December 1986), Michelle's biological mother, written out.
- Jimmy Ramsey, Talked about but never seen, brother of Claire Ramsey.
- Dr. Louie Darnell (Eric Brooks, 1983 until December 1986), written out.
- Lola Fontaine AKA Mary Francis (Megan McTavish, 1983 until December 1984), written out.
- Eli Sims (Stephen Joyce, July 1983 until November 1983), Annabelle's father, character killed.
- Annie Sims (talked about but not seen), killed by Eli in 1963, Annabelle's mother.
- Darcy Dekker (Robin V. Johnson, November 1983 until August 1984, brief reappearance in 1988), character went to prison and was released.
- Gina Daniels (Annabelle Gurwitch, November 1983 until December 1985), written out.
- Lt. Jeff Saunders (David A. Little, November 1983 until December 1985), written out.
- Alicia Rhomer (Cynthia Dozier, December 1983 until July 1985), character went to prison.
- Nick (sidewalk Santa) (Rex Everhart), December 1983, and several subsequent Christmastimes in the 1980s.
- Fletcher Reade (Jay Hammer, first appeared in May 1984), married Maeve, adopted Ben.
- Susan Piper (Carrie Nye, May 1984 until November 1984), presumed deceased.
- Andy Ferris (Victor Slezak, July 1984 until February 1985), character killed by Floyd.
- David Preston (John Martinuzzi, October 1984 until November 1985), character killed by Suzette.
- Charlotte Wheaton (Barbara Garrick, April until June 1985), character killed by Alicia.
- Jackson Freemont (Michael Wilding, Jr., son of Elizabeth Taylor, June 1985 until 1987), written out.
- Suzette Saxon (Frances Fisher, June until December 1985), character went to prison.
- Dr. Mark Jarrett (Keir Dullea, 1986), written out.
- Cameron Stewart (Ian Ziering, October 1986 until September 1988), dated Dinah, written out.
- George Stewart (Joe Lambie, December 1986 until Summer 1988), Cameron's dad, character went to prison.
- Christine Valere (Ariana Chase, Fall 1986 until June 1987), written out.
- Paul Valere (Robin Ward, January until May 1987), character killed by Warren.
- Dr. Eileen Lyndon (Cynthia Hayden), first appeared in March 1987.
- Elise (Calista Flockhart, April 1989), Marah's babysitter.
- Gilly Grant (Amelia Marshall, first appeared in May 1989).
- Hampton Speakes (Vince Williams, first appeared on July 14, 1989).
- Dana Jones (Katell Plevin, first appeared in July 1989).
- Neil Everest (Patrick O'Connell, first appeared in Fall 1989).
- Gary Swanson (William Bell Sullivan, first appeared in Fall 1989).
- Rae Rooney (Allison Daugherty Smith, first appeared in November 1989).
- Suzy (Janet Aldrich, Escort with Roxie in Tulsa, part of her memory loss, first appeared in fall 1986).

== Plot development ==
=== 1980–1983 ===
Bea Reardon and her daughter Nola Reardon were introduced in January 1980 while Roger Thorpe was on the run and trying to kidnap his daughter. Roger disguised himself as a German Professor Schneider who was staying at the Reardon Boarding house. Nola almost turned Roger into the authorities before he kidnapped Rita. The Reardons had always lived in Springfield, and Bea thought her husband Hugh Thomas "Tom" Reardon had abandoned her and their seven children. Nola was the only child still at home at the time the Reardons were introduced.

Nola's introduction would be the crux for the other younger teen characters and teen angst storylines. A couple of days after Roger left and kidnapped Rita, Ed's god son, Speedo-clad and the well-muscled Kelly Nelson came to stay at the Boarding House. Alcoholic Tim Werner also returned, and became friends with Kelly. Although Kelly was now dating Hillary, Hillary would gain competition from both Nola and a totally unforeseen force as the year 1980 continued. Nola, who had many movie fantasies (championing herself as being the next Bette Davis), incorporated Kelly into her romantic movie fantasies, with Kelly none the wiser.

Although Amanda Wexler had married Ben McFarren, Lucille Wexler continued to interfere in her daughter's life, and harbored fantasies of killing Ben. Lucille hired a financial advisor for Amanda, attorney Derek Colby (Harley Venton). Lucille tried to throw Amanda and Derek together in an attempt to break-up Amanda and Ben, but Amanda found Derek to be too provincial and got angry at both. Derek would later go on to work with Ross for a time and also met Hillary Bauer who he found attractive and pined for. Derek continued to advise Amanda on matters of finance. Derek was also revealed to be a former neighbor to the Reardons and had graduated high school at the same time as Nola's yet-to-be-seen older brother, Tony.

Meanwhile, in what seemed a totally unrelated story, Lucille hired as her new housekeeper the newly arrived in town Jennifer Richards. Jennifer had arrived with her husband Walter Richards and their teenage daughter, Morgan. Unfortunately, Walter died in an accident, hit by Mike Bauer's car. Mike felt guilty for Walter's death (although the courts ruled it an accident and Mike helped Jennifer and Morgan in relocating to Springfield). Jennifer hired Kelly as Morgan's tutor, and tried to set up her daughter with Tim Werner. But it soon became apparent that sparks were flying between Kelly and Morgan. But Nola wasn't about to sit still and let the younger Morgan take Kelly away. Nola was about to think of plots to take Kelly away from both Hillary and Morgan (Brown played the role with such gusto that she received more hate mail than any CBS actor since Eileen Fulton). Lucille, now jealous of how close Jennifer and Amanda were becoming, turned her attention to killing Ben to get Jennifer in trouble.

Also reintroduced in the first half of 1980 was Holly's brother Andy Norris, who had become a novelist and had become interested in the intrigue of Alan Spaulding. Andy thought that Alan's story might make a great novel and a wonderful television miniseries. Katie Parker, after being disappointed romantically by Dr. Mark Hamilton (who would suddenly just stop appearing on the show), became involved with Andy. Katie was also working as an assistant to Dr. Sara McIntyre, who had become a sex therapist. When Andy discovered that Katie was working for Sara, he began dating Katie. He stole Katie's keys to Sara's files, copied them, and late at night broke into Sara's office to find out the sexual peccadillo of several Springfield residents, so that he could blackmail them. Andy would later be arrested in August 1981, when Hillary discovered what he was doing.

The woman that Andy dumped to pursue Katie was also new to the show, the darkly beautiful, but very spoiled Vanessa Chamberlain. Vanessa arrived in town shortly after her father, Henry Chamberlain. Henry and Vanessa were very rich, and were Spaulding stockholders. Upon his arrival in town, widower Henry Chamberlain briefly dated Viola Stapleton, Rita and Eve's mother, who had become tired of the stress Springfield and her daughters brought to her life, and moved back to her hometown of Bluefield, West Virginia, before anything could come of it. Henry would go on to date Bea Reardon. The recently divorced Vanessa had been involved with Ross Marler, but had dumped him for a rich boy. Vanessa tried to get reinvolved with Ross, but Ross, who was involved with Eve, would resist Vanessa's attempts at seduction. Vanessa also kissed Ross' younger colleague, Derek Colby as a joke, although Derek later developed unreciprocated feelings for Vanessa, after Derek saved Vanessa's life when she attempted suicide in the fall of 1980. Between Vanessa and Nola's machinations, Guiding Light, written by Doug Marland, was certainly becoming a racy and for many must-see television show.

Lucille Wexler soon found out that her housekeeper Jennifer was the long lost Jane Marie Stafford, when she paid a visit to the Springfield Arms hotel and to Jane Marie's older brother, Chet Stafford. Lucille, who had continued to drive a wedge between Ben McFarren and her "daughter", Amanda and their new marriage (including trying to still kill Ben), became increasingly paranoid that someone would find out that Amanda wasn't her biological daughter but Jennifer and Alan's. After Lucille made anonymous threatening phone calls to Amanda, Lucille arrived home to find Jennifer playing the piano (Alan and Jane Marie's favorite song, Misty by Johnny Mathis) and tried to kill Jennifer, shouting, "JANE MARIE!". Jennifer quickly whirled around to find Lucille behind her about to stab her, and Jennifer started fighting with the older woman. When Amanda came home with Ross, Lucille had ended up stabbing herself, and on her deathbed Lucille falsely told Amanda that Jennifer had stabbed her in cold blood. When Mike defended Jennifer of murder charges, with Ross now District Attorney and out for blood, Jennifer wouldn't offer any defense. Jennifer also refused to meet with either Alan or Jane Marie's brother, Chet. In January 1981, after Derek (now working for Mike) investigated and found Alan's new private investigator in Chet's hotel room, Mike decided to put Jennifer on the witness stand in her own defense while Derek brought both Alan and Chet into the courtroom. In emotional scenes (interrupted by CBS News reports of the end of the Iran hostage crisis; the producers later showed these scenes due to the amount of phone calls into CBS's switchboard angry with the interruption), it was revealed that Amanda was the biological daughter of both Alan and Jennifer. Amanda suffered a miscarriage (of Ben's baby) due to the stress of finding out the truth (in 1997, in a major rewrite, Amanda learned that her father was Brandon Spaulding and Alan was her brother—a move that was unpopular with many long time viewers).

Shortly after the original reveal of Amanda being Alan and Jennifer's biological daughter, Eve Stapleton started being chased around by a stalker. But in the end Amanda, upon finding many of her personal items missing from the Wexler main house, discovered that her uncle Chet was the one stalking Eve when Amanda found a shrine to herself in Chet's hotel room. Fearing that something horrible was about to happen, Amanda rushed to the Wexler estate's cottage, and saw Chet pointing a gun at Eve's head. Amanda and Ben provided a distraction, and Amanda tried to talk her uncle to giving himself up, but Chet refused. After releasing Eve, Chet tried to make a run for it, but the police shot him. As Chet lay dying at Cedars, he admitted to Amanda the only reason he was stalking Eve was to protect her failing marriage to Ben, and Chet told Amanda he loved her with his dying words. A grieved Amanda returned to playing with dolls, but Ben gave her the strength to put away the dolls, and Amanda became a capable businesswoman beside her "father", Alan. Amanda would later grant Ben a divorce, and Ben and Eve would remarry in a quiet ceremony, after which they decided to relocate to Paris, where Ben could focus on his painting; Ben left in November 1982, while Eve remained in Springfield for a few more months, to help Justin with his infant daughter, after Jackie's sudden death, before joining Ben in Paris in early 1983.

While all of this was going on, Nola Reardon was also continuing in her pursuit of Kelly Nelson. To that end, Nola would get herself pregnant. First she gave Morgan birth control pills, in case she wanted to take Tim to bed, knowing that would get Morgan in trouble with Jennifer. She then kept plying Tim with alcohol, despite Ed, Sara and Kelly's best effort to keep Tim clean and sober. Then she set up Tim to see Morgan and Kelly kissing, and set Tim and Kelly against each other several times. Floyd kept being a nuisance to Nola's plan, telling Nola she loved her. But Nola had an idea to use Floyd, especially when her mother, Bea, tried to have Nola see that marrying Floyd might not be the worst thing. Twice Nola plied Kelly with alcohol and put him in her bed nude. Then she had sex with Floyd in another room in the boarding house, with Kelly and Floyd none the wiser, although one time in fall 1980, Bea and Kelly's visiting father nearly caught Nola in the act of setting this up. She got the ever increasingly suspicious Hillary away from Kelly, by telling Kelly that Hillary and Derek Colby were having an affair (with Kelly punching out a confused Derek and calling off his relationship with equally confused Hillary). Nola finally found herself pregnant shortly after Christmas 1980. She told everyone that it was Kelly's child, knowing full well it was Floyd's. Hillary and Bea knew that she was lying, but didn't know how to have Nola tell the truth.

In March 1981, after Kelly and Tim saved Morgan from the clutches of criminal Duke Lafferty, Kelly and Morgan seemed to grow closer—so Nola reminded Kelly that she was pregnant with "his" child. Then a very unlikely person entered this scenario, when Vanessa started becoming closer to Ed after Rita left Springfield, Vanessa hired Joe Bradley to find Rita to make sure she stayed gone for good. Joe was staying at the Boarding House at this time, when Joe's relationship with Diane Ballard started to grow complicated as Diane and Joe tried to one-upmanship in their mutual desire to bring down Alan Spaulding and take over Spaulding Enterprises. When Vanessa visited Joe at the Boarding House she took an instant disliking to Nola (and the feelings were mutual), and Vanessa accidentally caught Nola in one of her lies about the timing of when she became pregnant, and also talking to Tim into getting drunk (which Vanessa knew from her relationship with Ed was the last thing Tim needed). Vanessa thought of Nola as nothing but a guttersnipe, and went to Hillary about her suspicions. Sure enough in a rather violent way, things were about to come to ahead. At their senior prom, Tim was bullied into drinking by some of his classmates who had no clue to Tim's alcoholic past. Tim then got angry with his date, Morgan in the drive home, when Morgan wouldn't deny that she still loved Kelly. Tim wrapped his car around a tree sending Morgan into a coma for several weeks. That's when Hillary found out from Cedars OB-GYN Dr. Margaret Sedwick that something was suspicious about the timing as to when Nola became pregnant. Hillary told Bea about the discrepancy, and just before Morgan awoke from her coma, Bea confronted her daughter about who the father really was. Nola finally had to admit to Bea that she was pregnant not with Kelly's baby, but Floyd's. Unfortunately for Nola, the admission came out well Kelly, Floyd, Tim and Vanessa were all at the Boarding House. After this Kelly read Nola the riot act, and went and married Morgan. The only two people who remained Nola's friends were Gracie Middleton and Derek Colby, both who had no idea what Nola had done. Nola would a bit later consult Derek as a financial advisor which Nola knew would irritate Hillary. Tim finally realized he needed help with his drinking problem, and went to rehab. Later he would marry nurse Trudy Wilson who had pined after Tim for a long time. Around this same time, Sara married her longtime friend, Adam Thorpe, Roger Thorpe's father, and Sara, Adam, Tim and Trudy would all relocate to Oregon, in 1983.

Vanessa considered Nola the town trollop, and Floyd asked Nola to marry him. Nola was tempted to get an abortion, but Nola's older brother, Anthony "Tony" Reardon came back to town and talked Nola out of it. Nola then decided to marry Floyd, but on their wedding day, at the courthouse, instead of Nola saying yes, instead she said, "I don't", and walked away realizing she wasn't in love with Floyd and didn't want to be trapped in a loveless marriage with a man she didn't even respect. Many in Springfield wondered how Nola was going to provide for herself and her baby, and very soon the answer to that was going to be provided in a most surprising way.

Around that time, August – September 1981, then Executive Producer Allen Potter made some major casting changes that didn't necessarily sit well with many viewers of the time. Besides changing the red-haired Kristen Vigard out with the blonde-haired Jennifer Cooke, Potter also changed Mart Hulswit, who had played Dr. Ed Bauer since 1969, with a slightly younger actor named Peter Simon. It did take a while for many viewers to relate to Simon, but eventually they did, but in fall 1981 it was rather jarring. It didn't help matters that at the same time Maeve Kinkead, who played Vanessa was pregnant and Potter granted Kinkead a rather generous maternity leave, until February of the next year. Kinkead was replaced temporarily with actress, Anna Stuart right while the relationship between Vanessa and Ed was heating up and Vanessa was lying many times to Ed. Vanessa as played by Stuart even did the same thing to Ed, she attempted with Ross Marler, and went over to Ed's house clothed in nothing but a fur coat.

In fall 1981, Doug Marland wrote a grand murder mystery revolving around two characters that would involve half the canvas of the show, and would be the introduction of two storylines involving characters who ended up being not who they seemed to be. Shortly before the fall of 1981, Ross Marler ended his relationship with Eve Stapleton McFarren, seeing how Eve was now back with Ben McFarren or at least working on their relationship. Ben also quit as the graphic artist at Spaulding Enterprises, and helped Diane Ballard find another graphic designer. The choice that Ben and Diane came up with was a woman from Milwaukee named Carrie Todd. Elliot was a popular soap opera actress that Marland had known from his days writing for ABC's General Hospital (which was the number one rated soap at that time). Elliot moved from California to New York with the promise by Marland of a fabulous storyline for the character of Carrie. Carrie was introduced to Ross, and it was love at first sight. Carrie was the total antithesis of Ross' character. Whereas Ross was very strict, even to the point of what many would say was "uptight" and didn't really relate to a healthy lifestyle; Carrie was into being carefree (or so it seemed) and led a very healthy lifestyle of eating vegetables, doing yoga and other exercises. Ross never met a woman like Carrie, and the two hit it off with Ross adopting many of Carrie's lifestyle choices (or at least trying to). Very soon Carrie and Ross moved into together, and then got engaged.

As is usually the case on most soap operas, things weren't really that rosy between the two of them. Ross was let on to the secret that his brother Justin Marler and Jackie Marler, who had gotten remarried after Elizabeth Spaulding left the country, were actually the biological parents of Phillip Spaulding. Ross had also used Amanda to further his career, and Diane Ballard knew that Ross still carried a torch for the still emotionally fragile Amanda. Diane also was still after getting control of Spaulding, and started threatening not only Justin, Jackie and Ross, but also Alan (Diane had gotten from Roger Thorpe's apartment the affidavits from de Vilar, and an audiotape that Roger had made detailing his blackmailing of Alan). Diane tried to force Alan, and Ross to remove Phillip from Alan's will. Diane also was blackmailing Henry Chamberlain about the fact that he had an affair with a woman named, Stephanie Ryan before he married Vanessa's mother, and that Henry and Stephanie had a son named, Sean Ryan, that Henry had lost track of and had no idea where he was (Diane would tell Henry she knew where Sean was, whether she did or not is questionable). Diane also had tried to seduce Andy Norris before he was arrested, and while Andy was being set up by Alan and Mike Bauer to be arrested, Diane stole all of the information that Andy had in his possession including the fact that Alan and Rita had an affair, and that Vanessa had Rita's supposed new address in San Francisco (although Joe Bradley might have given Vanessa a false lead). Diane had broken things off with Joe, and she found out some unidentified information about Joe that could ruin his private investigation business. Diane would use the information against Henry and Vanessa, and also the fact that Derek Colby had expressed interest in Vanessa, to have Derek force Henry and Vanessa to sign over their stock in Spaulding to her, or Diane would go to Alan and let him know that Henry had signed a deal with Jocelyn Electronics that would benefit Henry and his daughter over Alan's family. And unknown to everyone else in town, Carrie and Diane had a past, that Carrie and Diane were mortal enemies. Everything came to a head when Alan fired Diane, and Diane threatened Alan that she'd let it be known how Alan had "bought" Phillip as his son and that Phillip wasn't really a Spaulding. Diane had also gotten access to enough stock to force Alan out of his own company. Unfortunately for Diane, before she could oust Alan, she was killed by a blow to the head when she was pushed into her fireplace mantel. (In a gruesome scene Vanessa as played by Stuart came to see Diane and found her body {or Landon Geier's body} strewn against the fireplace mantel her head bludgeoned).

Right away it was known, by the audience, that Joe had stolen all of Diane's blackmail items out of her apartment, and Joe tried to blackmail Alan in turn. Also the affair between Rita and Alan came out when the pregnant Hope Bauer Spaulding (who had overheard an argument between Alan and Henry about the affair) ran her car into a tree and gave birth prematurely to their son, Alan-Michael Spaulding. Joe, in trying to go around Mike and the police to investigate Diane's death, let it be known in flashbacks told to the audience not only was he in Diane's apartment the night she was killed, but so was Henry and Vanessa Chamberlain, Justin and Jackie Marler, and Alan Spaulding. But Joe was confused, because although he had thrown Diane against the fireplace mantel, she was still alive when he left her apartment. As Joe was leaving the crime scene he saw a mysterious woman in a beige overcoat come to Diane's roped off apartment and when Joe finally realized who the woman was (it was Carrie), it was too late. Carrie followed Joe to his hotel room in the nearby town of Clayton (he had since moved out of the Boarding House), where Joe was typing up a further blackmail note to Alan, and as would be learned later Carrie and Joe ended up in a struggle over both the blackmail information from Diane's apartment and Joe's gun. Joe would end up on the losing end of this struggle, and Mike and the police found Joe's body, face down, with a bullet through his chest (a gruesome scene replayed several times with a bloody chested Michael J. Stark, along with Diane being thrown against the fireplace mantel, yet again, by Carrie, into the end of January 1982).

Mike and the police immediately assumed that Alan was Joe's killer, and Mike followed Alan, Hope and Alan-Michael on a honeymoon trip to the island country of Tenerife, in October 1981, where some mysterious one-eyed man (the other eye had a patch over it) was trying to kill Alan, but almost killed Mike (Alan saved Mike's life, when Alan realized he couldn't let his father-in-law die) and returned to Springfield, where eventually he'd be arrested and sent to prison for his role in covering up Roger Thorpe's "death" in June 1979.

Back in Springfield, it would be learned by Ross that Carrie was the murderer of Joe and Diane, when Ross found all of Diane's blackmail information in Carrie's apartment. Ed also found out about Vanessa knowing about Rita's new address when he overheard a conversation between Vanessa and his supposedly soon-to-be brother-in-law, Derek Colby, about Vanessa letting Ed know the truth. Vanessa then mysteriously left town (Stuart also left the canvas). Carrie also mysterious disappeared only to show up in Chicago hitting up Jackie's father, Emmet, for money, so she could have parties and dance all over town. Ross followed Carrie to Chicago and brought her back to Springfield, where Ross defended Carrie in a murder trial (showing how Marland continued to not always have every character know every other character, in town, had one of the jury members be Bea Reardon). When the truth about Diane and Carrie's past in Milwaukee came to light (the short story, Diane and Carrie Anderson had worked at a firm named Laird & Sogard, and so did the first man that Carrie married, Todd MacKenzie. When Diane found out Todd was cooking the books, she started blackmailing him. A pregnant Carrie found out, and when Todd committed suicide, Carrie blamed Diane for his death. And she gave the baby boy up for adoption). Carrie then told the court that when she went to Joe's hotel room she tried to get him to turn in the information he had to the police, but Joe refused, so they got into a struggle where Joe's gun accidentally went off and he was killed. Carrie was exonerated when the jury declared both deaths an accident. Shortly after Carrie and Ross married on Valentine's Day, 1982. Ross took Carrie to Seattle, for their honeymoon, where it turned out that Ross had a surprise for Carrie that her son with Todd was adopted by a couple named Howard and Betty Long. Carrie and Ross seemed to be finally happy, but Marland had other things in store for this couple. Ed would also find his true love (and fourth wife) when Bea's second child, Maureen Reardon came to Springfield, and after some personal struggles, Ed and Maureen (or Mo as she was called) would be married in March 1983.

Nola continued to look for work (to support her and the unborn baby that she continued to deny was Floyd's), and stay with her somewhat ditzy friend and hairdresser, Gracie Middleton. Nola tried to get a job to replace Diane Ballard, but the Spaulding Enterprises' human resources took one look at the punk hairstyle Gracie talked Nola into getting and said an affirmative "no" to Nola. But Marland would soon have Nola paired with the man who she did get employed by, as his house manager. Ultimately, Nola reformed, and had a popular romance with the mysterious archaeologist Quinton "Quint" McCord. (Nola as a fan of old, classic movies, and her storyline with Quint was written to echo the film Rebecca.) Quint was later revealed to be the half-brother of the spoiled Vanessa. (Sean Ryan that Diane Ballard had blackmailed Henry over.) Quint in 1983, after he proposed to Nola and also fought off one of his archeology rivals, the evil Silas Crocker who was killed in a cave-in at Tanquir, changed his last name to Chamberlain.

Nola gave birth to a daughter named Kelly Louise Reardon, shortly after New Year's Day 1982. Nola would try and continue to pass off the child as Kelly's, but Floyd continued to pester her about the child. Dragged into this unwittingly was Hillary Bauer and Derek Colby. Nola's brother, Tony knew Derek from high school, and wasn't particularly happy that Hillary (who Tony had taken a shine to) was engaged to Derek. So a few times, Tony roughed up Derek. Vanessa picking up on some rough patch between Hillary and Derek, and wanting to get Nola in trouble, wrote Derek a letter that Vanessa forged Nola's signature to where she detailed an affair between Hillary and Tony. Derek got mad and left town, after confronting a confused Hillary, never to be seen from again (this was the first of three unpopular cast departures, in the late spring, early summer of 1982, this one for Harley Venton). Tony confronted an equally confused Nola about the letter, at Kelly Louise's christening, in June 1982, and it all came out about the baby being Floyd's biological daughter, and not Kelly's. Nola and Quint would later change Kelly Louise's first name to Anastasia (or "Stacey" for short) for one of Nola's favorite motion picture characters, and the Louise was kept because of Katie and Floyd Parker's mother. Quint would forgive Nola, but Floyd continued to pester her, even though Floyd seemed to find some happiness with new Cedars nurse Lesley Ann Monroe, and especially after Floyd's dreams of a rock star career came to a screeching halt after, Floyd found out about Lesley Ann being pressured by new in town oil businessman Joshua "Josh" Lewis (played by Robert Newman who has held the role of Josh off and on from October 1981 through Guiding Light's 2009 cancellation.) about Lesley Ann's past as a prostitute in Tulsa, Oklahoma, and Floyd punched out Josh.

While not focusing on the working-class Reardon family he so loved, Marland brought in a disco set, with Nola and Maureen's brother, Tony, opening up a nightclub known as "Wired For Sound", with many musical guest stars (Neil Sedaka, Ashford & Simpson, Bee Gees, Bertie Higgins, The B-52's, Judy Collins, and Floyd's rock group, Sour Grapes). Marland also introduced some of Josh's other family, including Trish Lewis (actually shortly before he'd introduce Josh in 1981). Trish had originally been married to Andy Norris (and Andy had been very physically abusive to her; Trish helped Mike, Alan and the Springfield police capture and arrest Andy) and then in a romance with Tony Reardon, but later would be in an affair with Alan Spaulding, after Alan was released from prison, she'd also hook up for a while with Ross Marler in 1983–1984. Josh and Trish would talk about their father Harlan Billy Lewis I (who had found their oil company) that both Alan, and the company Josh, Amanda and Ross founded, Los Tres Amigos both wanted to have working with them, and also talked about their older brother Harlan Billy Lewis II—known as just Billy.

As it turned out, Carrie Marler's problems were due to her having a multiple personality disorder. As one of the split personalities known as Carrie Anderson (or Carrie No. 2 for short), Carrie seduced Josh Lewis into her bed, seduced the next door neighbor boy, Ron Kennedy to lose his virginity to her, and also put herself in bed with Justin (which both Jackie and Ross both found out about) and Carrie No. 2 falsely accused Justin and herself of having an affair. Carrie No. 1 or the original personality, Carrie Todd Marler came to, she was very confused and outraged at Ross' accusations. Things came to a head in May 1982, when Carrie No. 2 came to Josh's office and screamed hysterically, at Josh that he had promised to marry her once she divorced Ross. Derek Colby overheard this, and Carrie No. 2 came out and kissed Derek on the cheek (which totally embarrassed Derek, especially when Ross showed up and Carrie No. 2 ran off; Derek had apparently felt slightly guilty about this kiss when he confronted Hillary about the letter supposedly from "Nola" about Hillary's "affair" with Tony Reardon). Josh would also have an affair with Morgan Nelson, whose modeling career Josh was funding, which would later lead to the break-up of Morgan and Kelly's marriage. Later in the month, Carrie No. 2 would attempt to kill Ross with a pair of sewing scissors, but luckily before Carrie No. 2 could do so, Carrie No. 1 came to, and Ross got her to go to Dr. Sara McIntyre for treatment. Unfortunately, Sara didn't know if she had enough resources to make Carrie whole, but did get a third personality, Carrie McKenzie (or Carrie #3) a childlike personality, to give her strength to Carrie No. 1 to help her heal, and then Carrie was sent off to England for treatment with a specialist. Carrie also called Jackie, to apologize, before she left (Jackie had gone off to stay with her father in May 1982, after "discovering" the "affair" between Justin and Carrie), and Jackie began making her way home to Justin, Phillip and their recently born (also September 1981) daughter, Samantha Marler, but Jackie would be killed in a plane crash before she could make it home.

Vanessa Chamberlain was put into an odd relationship with the lower middle class, Tony Reardon, when her friend Trish Lewis recommended Tony to help with some repairs in her apartment. Tony would break up with Vanessa, after Nola and Hillary let Tony know about Vanessa's role in getting Derek Colby to leave Hillary. (Surprisingly though Derek started dating Katie, who understood about the friendship between him and Nola, where Hillary did not, but Derek and Hillary had very little interaction in scenes as they somehow avoided each other. Derek, as well as Harley Venton the show, would leave Springfield when he started to realize that Katie was really in love with Justin Marler.)

Nola and Quint would marry in a very romantic ceremony (although Nola would have to catch a ride in the back of a fire engine when she was almost late to the ceremony), and then during their honeymoon Nola and Quint were caught up in an oddly written ghost story during their honeymoon (Nola would also give birth to a son, in May 1984, the producers at the time had the audience get caught up in a baby naming contest, and the name that won was Anthony James Chamberlain. But in 1995–1996, when Nola and her son made a return appearance in Springfield, the name of the SORASed son was just, "J" Chamberlain).

The affair between Alan and Trish became more convoluted and when it came out during the time Browne was writing the show in the summer of 1983, it would lead to Hope Bauer Spaulding becoming an alcoholic as her uncle Ed and grandfather had been. (There were some great scenes with Elvira Russell during these episodes, but the writing was considered flat). Hope would take Alan-Michael out of town, to New York City, in November 1983 (the first of several Bauers that would soon leave the show).

Floyd Parker lost all his money and prestige as a rock star, after staying for a time in the Spaulding mansion while Alan was in prison, after punching out his manager Josh Lewis But Floyd would not stop seeing Lesley Ann Monroe. Lesley Ann started to find herself attracted to Cedars Hospital administrator Warren Andrews. Warren was put into place as administrator (after Adam Thorpe, who'd previously held the position, left Springfield), by a health care organization, and immediately butted heads with Dr. Ed Bauer, the longtime Cedars chief-of-staff. Warren would even end up hiring Ed's wife, Maureen, as the vice administrator, after the writers decided to have Maureen miscarry their child (a child Ed at first said to Kelly he felt too old to have). Also Hillary and Katie went very underused as characters.

But probably the most bizarre storyline revolved around the mystery of the men that Marland had set up to kill Alan back in the fall of 1981. The whole mystery seemed to revolve around a man named, Samuel Pasquin, who would turn out to be really Spaulding employee, Mark Evans who got Jennifer Richards to marry him, but then had an affair with her and Alan's daughter, Amanda Spaulding. In the end, in April and May 1983, this storyline would be convoluted to the point of dragging in both Nola Reardon and Quinton Chamberlain. Mark would end up falling to his death taking psychotic ex-lover Mona Enright aka Rebecca Cartwright along with him, as she was about to kill both Amanda and her ex-lover Quint.

A new storyline was introduced that used the returning Bill Bauer (for about a week) and Tony finding some mysterious film in a camera that his father owned. This storyline would introduce to the canvas both H.B. and Billy Lewis, as the mystery of a certain picture developed by Tony deepened. Tony met the love of his life during this story, English professor, Annabelle Sims. But Annabelle's father, navy man, Eli Sims was another matter. For the whole storyline focused on the fact that Eli had not only killed his wife and therefore Annabelle's mother, Annie (Kozak in a dual role), back in 1963, but had also killed Tom Reardon (Gregory Beecroft in a dual role) when he caught not only Tom, but also H.B., Henry Chamberlain, Bill Bauer (not long before he moved to Springfield) and Alan's father, Brandon Spaulding (played in these flashbacks by John Wardell), carrying on with Annie during a fishing expedition just outside Springfield. After Eli was caught, with him almost blowing up half the town (or at least half of the show's canvas of characters), with Ross Marler saving everyone, the mystery of Tom's disappearance and death was cleared up. For a while, Bea was mad at Henry for keeping the mystery a secret, but later forgave him. And the Reardons welcomed Annabelle into their family, with Tony and Annabelle marrying in May 1984.

Warren and Lesley Ann would also marry in spring 1984, but only after a jealous Floyd told Warren all about Lesley Ann's past and Lesley Ann nearly committed suicide, but Katie and Floyd stopped her from doing so.

Before Allen Potter was forced out as Executive Producer, in the middle of 1983, and replaced by Gail Kobe, the characters of Rick Bauer (Ed and Leslie Jackson Bauer's son) and Phillip Spaulding were SORASed, reintroduced as older teenagers, and brought on were the character of Beth Raines and a more prominent role for the Lewises. The decision to feature the Lewises came as a result of the prime-time series, Dallas and the cancellation of Procter & Gamble's soap, Texas The show introduced Billy's vivacious daughter, Melinda Sue "Mindy" Lewis. Beth was living in an abusive situation with her stepfather, Bradley Raines and with her mother Cedars nurse, Lillian Raines. Phillip, Rick, Mindy and Beth would go through high school together, and then college. They would affectionately be known as the Four Musketeers. Bradley though, with Mindy's unwitting help, would find out the truth about Phillip's birth and tell him before Alan and Justin had a chance too, and for a while, Phillip refused to accept both men back in his life. He'd forgive Justin before the end of 1983, but not Alan. Beth would also be raped by Bradley, which would halt the romance building between Phillip and Beth.

In 1983, the show focused on Rick Bauer, Phillip Spaulding, Mindy Lewis and Beth Raines, with Phillip and Beth running away to New York City to escape the dangerous Bradley (who would end up in prison for the rape), Beth and Phillip & then Rick and Mindy nearly became separate married couples (until Billy found out that Mindy was pregnant with Phillip's child and Billy forced Mindy and Phillip to marry. Mindy shortly after miscarried the child and both Phillip and Mindy, divorced and then tried to get back to their first loves, Beth and Rick, but both of them had since moved on).

Trish was gradually phased out and the character and actress left in 1985, with occasional visits afterwards. Josh went from a cad to a brooding young hero. Billy "tamed" Vanessa and in retaliation, and in jealousy Alan brought Billy's ex-wife Reva to town to break them up. Reva soon fell back into the arms of her true love Josh ("Bud"), but along the way managed to marry or have sex with a variety of men, including Josh's own father. (Zimmer would win the first of four Daytime Emmy awards for her portrayal of Reva, in 1985).

=== 1984–1985 ===
In 1984, Long also created the regal Alexandra Spaulding, and the show scored a casting coup by landing Beverlee McKinsey, who had a memorable run as Iris on Another World and Texas. The storyline of the Four Musketeers proved so popular that Guiding Light managed to dethrone then-powerhouse General Hospital from the top ratings spot. Also in 1984, two other popular characters created by Long, were Brandon "Lujack" Luvonazcek and Alexandra's bratty former stepdaughter, India von Halkein. Lujack started out as a leader of an unruly gang called the Galahads, but then it was discovered that he was actually Alexandra's long lost son, that her father Brandon had her give him up. India would blackmail Phillip into marrying her after Phillip and Beth broke up. Lujack would later gain much respectability, after some future run-ins with the law, and after Phillip and Beth broke up Lujack and Beth would become popular lovers. Also introduced during this time was temptress, Dr. Claire Ramsey, who would end up having a one-night stand with Ed Bauer, and having their child, Michelle who was eventually adopted by Ed and Maureen. The success was short-lived though, as Long chose to write out or kill off nearly every Bauer (Hillary, Hope, and Mike) and replace them with yet more new creations. Charita Bauer died in February 1985. (Bert Bauer was said to have gone to stay with her sister-in-law Meta, when the actress first became ill; the character's death occurred off-camera in March 1986.)

Around this time the opening was updated from the Jack Urbont disco-themed opening to a slowed-down version of the disco opening to one using a theme that became popular with much of the audience, My Guiding Light. This slow opening was used, with several different changes, from June 1983 to early in January 1991, and incorporated action or beauty shots of the characters in action or scenes.

From the spring of 1984 to the spring of 1985, several stories seemed to get even more convoluted and bizarre. Such storylines as the Dreaming Death (that killed off the unpopular Lesley Ann Monroe, and meant that Alan Spaulding and his portrayer, Christopher Bernau departed, until 1986), the mystery surrounding the hauntings of Annabelle and Tony Reardon's cottage next to the Spaulding mansion (that near the end would bring in, Alexandra finding out that her father, Brandon was not dead after all—even though viewers had seen him die onscreen, but was living in Barbados with an entire new branch of the Spaulding family. Brandon's mistress Sharina and their daughter Victoria Spaulding). Vanessa giving birth to her and Billy's son and then getting hooked on a variety of different type of prescription drugs (a storyline and character point later revisited in a much better way in 1987), and finally Phillip being involved with a criminal named, Andy Ferris, who would end up blowing up a nightclub being built by Floyd Parker (who ended up winning the lottery in January 1984) and Lujack, that the explosion blinded Beth for a short time and then Andy being killed by being shot at Alexandra's Valentine's Day, 1985 party (with Lujack being arrested and imprisoned for a short time, and Floyd Parker being the one who shot Ferris, but only found out after he kidnapped India who knew the truth, and both Katie and Floyd Parker being written out), did not endear the audience to the show as it had under both Marland and in the early days of the Four Musketeers.

Another character introduced during the "Dreaming death" storyline was newspaper reporter, Fletcher Reade. Near the end of this time, 1985, the Reardons were also nearly totally written out, with Bea coming back in the second half of 1986 (but leaving again, in 1987) and later, in fall 1986, the creation of Chelsea Reardon (the youngest of Bea and Tom's children) helped somewhat, but the writing was on the wall when the ratings dropped, yet again.

Long left the show for a time, and the show went through a number of writers (and atrocious stories such as the "Sampson Girl" pageant, the "Infinity" brainwashing story, the introduction of Vanessa and Ross' long lost love child, daughter, Dinah Marler who was found in a carnival as a roadie, and the "Paul Valere" murder story) until she returned in the summer of 1987. With the departure of Long, the stories became even more convoluted, but fortunately, the casting of the show was still top-notch, with some of the characters and actors cast becoming favorites of much of the audience. Some of the characters introduced during this time were: Kyle Sampson. Kyle, was another Tulsa, Oklahoma businessman (Sampson Industries) who would turn out to be the son of former prostitute, Miss Sally Gleason from an affair she had with a Catholic cardinal, John Malone. Miss Sally also turned out to be the true biological mother of Billy Lewis, when it was revealed that unlike Trish and Josh's mother being "Miss Martha" (H.B.'s deceased wife), instead H.B. and Miss Sally had an affair that produced Billy.

Kyle got involved with Reva Shayne during the time that Josh left Springfield, and they both tried to help Reva's sister Roxie and her boyfriend Rick Bauer, who had gone to Canada after Roxie had lost her memory. Roxie also brought back a Canadian citizen, who Rick almost had arrested for being in the U.S. illegally, Kurt Corday who would end up marrying Mindy Lewis.

A little later, Reva and Roxie's father, Hawk Shayne, showed up in Springfield to help Miss Sally break up the budding romance of Reva and Kyle's, after Reva divorced H.B. But in an odd move, instead Miss Sally used an old family friend, and Springfield Journal newspaper editor, Maeve Stoddard, to break up the couple. Maeve found herself pregnant with Kyle's son (later named, Ben), and this would cause Reva to try to commit suicide. Reva would develop a relationship with Fletcher Reade, until Kyle learned that Fletcher was writing anonymous newspaper stories based on Reva's life.

Phillip (played during this time by John Bolger) had caught on to all of India's schemes to stay married to him, and he slowly got her out of his life (he would later become a novelist, and started dating Beth again shortly before her supposed death in the summer of 1986). India then became involved with a magician named, Simon Hall who was using India to get to his true mark, Alexandra Spaulding. After Lujack was killed in an explosion, Simon showed up in Springfield and tried to pass himself off as the long lost uncle of Lujack and therefore Brandon's son and Alexandra's half-brother (Alexandra would later learn that Simon wasn't related to the Spauldings at all. Simon was Eric Luvonchek's illegitimate son with a woman named Maggie and therefore Lujack's half-brother). Also introduced, around this time, was Calla Matthews, who was the sister of Lillian Raines, and her daughter, Jesse. Calla got re-involved with her high school sweetheart, Ross Marler, and Jesse lobbied for them to marry. Jesse would later get involved with Simon, despite her mom's protests, because Calla was hired as Alexandra's personal assistant. Calla though resisted both Lillian and Jesse's attempt to marry her off to Ross, and Ross and Vanessa at first suspected it was because Jesse was their long lost daughter, but later it would be revealed that Calla had contacted from her ex-husband Gordon Matthews a sexually transmitted disease.

For a while Claire would become Rick's medical school teacher at Cedar's, and nearly flunked him when it became apparent that Ed and Mo wouldn't comply with Claire's demands to give Michelle back to her. Claire would end up getting involved with the new marriage between Kyle and Maeve (as Maeve's doctor, but Fletcher would watch her every move not to hurt more of his friends), but in the meantime so did India, when India figured out that Kyle was paying for Reva's new house. Near the end of this time period, in the summer of 1986, Alan Spaulding (Christopher Bernau until the summer of 1988 and then played by Daniel Pilon until the winter of 1990) would come back to town and get involved with India and get her involved in an art forgery scam (Alan would later try to come between Vanessa and Billy, and much later with Reva and Josh, again). Alan had tried to convince Reva that the child she was pregnant with was really the departed Kyle's, but Reva would find out later that someone had doctored the paternity test results (this would be after Reva was briefly in a coma). It would also be learned that Claire's problems with others stemmed from her having a brain tumor, until a specialist named Mark Jarrett entered the picture and operated on her and removed successfully the tumor. Claire changed Rick's grade back to an "A", and then left town for a long time with Dr. Jarrett, as Mrs. Jarrett.

=== 1986–1988 ===
In the fall of 1986, Grant Aleksander was brought back as Phillip Spaulding and briefly got engaged to Chelsea Reardon. Ed's 3rd cousin Johnny Bauer a friend of Kurt Corday arrived in Springfield. Johnny's late grandfather Otto Bauer was the brother of Papa Frederich Bauer. In 1987 Johnny's younger sister Lacey would visit and leave Springfield. In 1988 Johnny and Lacey's parents Jack Bauer (Otto and Myra's son) and his wife Lainie would also visit and leave Springfield in that same year. Papa Frederich Bauer's late brothers, sisters-in-law, and their families which included Carl and Alice Bauer and their daughter Mary Bauer, Douglas and Ellen Bauer were mentioned at this time.

1987 plots included Vanessa's second bout of having a drug addiction problem, the creation of the Cooper family (a true lower-class family) with the first two Coopers introduced being Harley and Frank (Alan had attempted to smuggle illegal drugs through Frank's garage), Ed's 3rd cousin, airline pilot Johnny Bauer having cancer, and then going in remission with Reva's sister, Roxie becoming mentally ill and being taken to Switzerland, when Roxie who was in love with Johnny and didn't know that he had gone into remission. Long also brought back a SORASed Alan-Michael Spaulding who parachuted into the 1987 July 4 Bauer barbecue. Roxie and Reva's brother, Rusty Shayne who was a policeman, got into a relationship with Mindy Lewis (after Kurt Corday was killed in an oil-rig explosion) and later, Rose McLaren (whom he married). Kyle had left town after his disastrous relationship with Reva and had become involved with a woman named Amy Dupree. Kyle was left comatose in a plane crash that killed his pregnant fiancée Amy and his father Cardinal John Malone. Fletcher adopted Kyle's son with Maeve, Ben, and then married her, only to have Maeve die in a helicopter crash.

Long also began writing the dramatic story of Josh's wife, psychiatrist Soni Carerra (played by Michelle Forbes), and her alternate personality Solita. The story featured a strong performance by Forbes, although the 1988 writers' strike caused the plot to go wildly off course. Sonni would also get involved for a while with Alan.

Long plotted a storyline (before the writer's strike) where Phillip tried to use many people in Springfield (including Reva, Henry, Alexandra and Alan-Michael) to oust Alan as President of Spaulding Enterprises (this story was reminiscent of many of the real-life business scandals taking place at the time; this was also Christopher Bernau's last huge storyline before his departure). There were some wonderful scenes presented where Phillip was able to successfully take down Alan for many of his past crimes, but afterwards Phillip started feeling guilty and didn't know how to handle finally being near the top. A little while later Reva followed Alan to Venezuela to track down Sonni, but met up with the character of Blake Lindsey; (played by Elizabeth Dennehy, Sherry Stringfield, and Elizabeth Keifer, although Keifer was to play the character the longest from July 1992 to the present day), who at first seemed to be working for Alan. But when Blake was introduced to Phillip, Blake turned into an agent provocateur. Just as Sonni's multiple personality disorder storyline had gone off course during the writer's strike, so did the story involving Blake. During the writer's strike, it was revealed that Blake was the SORASed Christina Thorpe, Holly's daughter with Roger. Holly returned to Springfield, followed by the resurrection, in 1989, of Roger Thorpe. For a while, after Alan was sent to prison for nearly killing Blake and Phillip, at their first aborted wedding attempt, Roger would get involved with Sonni Carrera (after she was supposedly "cured" of her multiple personality disorder).

=== 1989 ===
In the last year of the 1980s, it would be revealed to everyone how dangerous the man who had originally helped Soni, covered up her multiple personality disorder was, and also doctored Reva's paternity test results (to keep Josh and Reva apart, so Soni and he could go after the Lewises' money), fellow psychiatrist Will Jeffries when he first kidnapped Marah Lewis; Reva's daughter with Josh (and tried to set up first, Elise played for one day by Calista Flockhart who was Marah's babysitter, then Soni and then his mother as the culprit), then he killed Rose McLaren Shayne and finally tried to kill Mindy, after he married her, until Will ended up falling off a cliff to his death (almost taking Mindy with him, but she was saved by Soni and Josh). Soni would leave Springfield (and Forbes the show) shortly after this, when Soni realized that Roger was not healthy for her continuing recovery.

One other storyline that intrigued viewers during 1989 was one that started during the writer's strike, but Long seemed to flesh out a lot better after the strike. In the fall of 1988, Rick Bauer met, got engaged and then married Fletcher Reade's sister and fellow doctor, Dr. Meredith Reade. Somehow though, during a time when Phillip was questioning his relationship with Blake and also Harley Cooper getting involved and about to marry Alan-Michael, Phillip and Meredith ended up having a romantic tryst. Meredith ended up pregnant with Phillip's child, but told Rick (when he became suspicious that it wasn't his child) that the child was some man she met at a medical conference. Later Rick discovered the truth, when Meredith miscarried the child (out of guilt), and Rick and Phillip, whose friendship was severely tested, ended up having many fights about this (wonderful scenes between O'Leary and Aleksander). Later after Meredith left town, Rick started to become concerned for Phillip's sanity when Phillip became convinced that Beth Raines was still alive (after Phillip had married Blake, this time for real and without Alan and Roger's interference). Of course in the end, Rick and Phillip would make amends when it was revealed that Blake and Roger were trying to cover up Beth really truly being alive in an attempt to keep Blake and Phillip's marriage alive (Blake briefly had Phillip placed in a mental institution).

In 1989, the first fully realized African-American characters were introduced on Guiding Light: Gilly Grant who worked at WSPR-TV with both Holly and Roger, and a friend of Billy's; former professional football player Hampton Speakes, and also introduced the illegitimate son of Billy and Reva's, Dylan Lewis, who had an affair with Harley, earlier, that produced a child named Daisy, who was adopted by the LeMays and renamed Susan (Susan and her adopted father, Jim played by Brittany Snow and Anthony Addabbo, respectively, would become part of the landscape at the end of the 1990s).

Reva's presumed death occurred in 1990. Reva drove her car into the Florida Keys while in a postpartum depression after delivering her son Shayne. Reva's last words, as her car plunged into the ocean, was to a disconcerted Josh waiting on the other side of the unfinished bridge were: "I'm coming Bud!"

1981–1982 Season (HH Ratings)

- 1. General Hospital 11.2
- 4. Guiding Light 8.0

1982–1983 Season

- 1. General Hospital 9.8
- 6. Guiding Light 7.4

1983–1984 Season

- 1. General Hospital 10.0
- 5. Guiding Light 8.1

1984–1985 Season

- 1. General Hospital 9.1
- 4. Guiding Light 7.5

1985–1986 Season

- 1. General Hospital 9.2
- 6. Guiding Light 6.8

1986–1987 Season

- 1. General Hospital 8.3
- 7. Guiding Light 6.3

1987–1988 Season

- 1. General Hospital 8.1 (#1 in viewers)
- 2. The Young and the Restless 8.1 (#2 in viewers)
- 7. Guiding Light 6.2

1988–1989 Season

- 1. The Young and the Restless 8.1
- 7. Guiding Light 6.2
