= Guiding Light (1990–1999) =

American television soap opera

Guiding Light was the longest-running American television soap opera. As of early 1994, it was the daytime soap opera with the highest proportion of female characters. In the 1990s, it also turned the series' "monster", the character of Roger Thorpe, into a protagonist.

== Show development ==
Pam Long, who had served as headwriter from 1983 to 1985 and again beginning in 1987, left the show in early 1991 and was replaced by a triumvirate of writers, Nancy Curlee, Stephen Demorest and James Reilly, the latter who went on to write Days of Our Lives and create Passions for NBC.

The realism of the early 1990s was in stark contrast to the mid-1980s, when self-described "Slut of Springfield", Reva Shayne (played by Kim Zimmer) was Guiding Light's central character and storylines tended to be more campy. In fact, executive producer Jill Farren Phelps believed the show was so good without her she didn't approach Zimmer to return even though Zimmer was available. For a time, Phelps was right; the show had become much more of an ensemble piece, with several key players.

== Executive producers ==
Guiding Light executive producers
Name	Years
Robert Calhoun	July 3, 1989 – July 12, 1991
Jill Farren Phelps	July 15, 1991 – May 26, 1995
Michael Laibson	May 29, 1995 – December 6, 1996
Paul Rauch	December 9, 1996 – December 24, 2002

== Major characters ==
The Bauers

- Dr. Ed Bauer (Peter Simon, 1981–1984, 1986–1996, 2002–2004, 2009; Robert Gentry, 1966–1969, 1997–1998)
- Maureen Reardon Davenport Bauer (Ellen Parker, 1986–1993, 1997, 1998, 1999, 2004)
- Dr. Rick Bauer (Michael O'Leary, 1983–1986, 1987–1991, 1995–2009)
- Michelle Bauer Santos (Rachel Miner, 1989–1995; Rebecca Budig, 1995–1998; Bethany Joy Lenz, 1998–2000)
- Meta Bauer White Roberts Banning (Mary Stuart, 1996–1999, 2000–2002)

The Spauldings

- Alexandra Spaulding (Beverlee McKinsey, 1984–1992; Marj Dusay, 1993–1997, 1998–1999, 2002–2009)
- Alan Spaulding (Ron Raines, 1994–2009)
- Phillip Spaulding (Grant Aleksander, 1982–1984, 1986–1991, 1996–2004, 2005, 2009)
- Alan-Michael Spaulding (Carl T. Evans, 1987–1990, 1997–1998, 2001; Rick Hearst, 1990–1996; Michael Dietz, 1996–1997)
- Beth Raines (Beth Chamberlin, 1989–1991, 1997–2009)
- Nick McHenry Spaulding (Vincent Irizarry, 1991–1996, 1998)
- Lizzie Spaulding (Julie Levine, 1990–1991; Hayden Panettiere, 1996, 1997–2000)
- Amanda Spaulding Thorpe (Toby Poser, 1995–1998)

The Lewises

- H.B. Lewis (Larry Gates, 1983–1988, 1989, 1990–1995)
- Billy Lewis (Jordan Clarke, 1983–1987, 1989–1993, 1996–1998, 1999–2009; Geoffrey Scott, 1993–1994)
- Joshua "Josh" Lewis (Robert Newman, 1981–1984, 1986–1991, 1993–2009)
- Shayne Lewis (Travis Cartier, 1990–1991; Bret Cooper, 1993–1997; Garrett Stevens, 1997–1999; Tony Michael Donnelly, 1999)
- Reva Shayne Lewis Lewis Spaulding Lewis Cooper Lewis Lewis (Kim Zimmer, 1983–1990, 1995–2009)
- Vanessa Chamberlain Lewis Lewis Reardon (Maeve Kinkead, 1980–1981, 1982–1987, 1989–2000, 2002, 2005, 2006–2009)
- Mindy Lewis Spaulding Corday Jeffries Spaulding, (Kimberley Simms, 1989–1992, 1997; Ann Hamilton, 1993; Barbara Crampton, 1993–1995)
- Dylan Lewis (Morgan Englund, 1989–1995, 1997, 1999, 2002, 2006, 2009)
- Bill Lewis III (Bryan Buffington, 1989–1998; Ryan Brown, 1998–2001)
- Marah Lewis (Ashley Peldon, 1988–1991; Kimberly J. Brown, 1993–1998, 2006; Lauren C. Mayhew, 1998–1999; Laura Bell Bundy, 1999–2001)

The Reardons/Chamberlains

- Bridget Reardon Lewis (Melissa Hayden, 1991–1997, 2009)
- Matt Reardon (Kurt McKinney, 1994–2000, 2005, 2006–2009)
- Chelsea Reardon (Kassie DePaiva, 1986–1991)
- Nola Reardon Chamberlain (Lisa Brown, 1980–1985, 1995–1998, 2009)
- Quinton "Quint" Chamberlain (Michael Tylo, 1981–1985, February 27, 1996–1997; Josh Taylor, 1997)
- Anthony James "J" Chamberlain (Ethan Erickson, 1996–1998)

The Marler/Thorpes

- Ross Marler (Jerry verDorn, 1979–2005)
- Christina "Blake" Thorpe Spaulding Spaulding Marler Marler (Sherry Stringfield, 1989–1992; Elizabeth Keifer, 1992–2009)
- Holly Norris Bauer Thorpe Lindsey Reade (Maureen Garrett, 1976–1980, 1988–2006, 2009)
- Roger Thorpe (Michael Zaslow, 1971, 1972–1975, 1975–1977, 1978–1980, 1989–1997; Dennis Parlato, 1997–1998)
- Hart Jessup (Jeff Phillips, 1991–1992; Leonard Stabb, 1993; Sean McDermott, 1993; Marshall Hilliard, 1995–1996; Frank Grillo, 1996–1999)
- Dinah Marler Thorpe Jessup (Wendy Moniz, 1995–1999)
- Samantha Marler (Suzy Cote, 1989–1992)

The Coopers

- Frank Cooper (Frank Dicopoulos, 1987–2009)
- Harley Davidson Cooper Spaulding Mallet Spaulding Aitoro (Beth Ehlers, 1987–1993, 1997–2008)
- Dante "Pops Cooper" Kouperakis (Vince O'Brien, 1987 until February 1990), character killed in the Fifth Street fire
- Nadine Corley Cooper Lewis Cooper (Jean Carol, 1988–1995, 2003, 2004, 2006)
- Eleni Andros Spaulding Cooper (Melina Kanakaredes, 1991–1995; Wendy Kaplan, 1994–1995; Jennifer Roszell, 1995–1999, 2001–2002, 2006, 2008–2009)
- Stavros Kouperakis (Eugene Troobnik, 1991–1995)
- Jenna Bradshaw Thorpe Morgan Cooper (Fiona Hutchison, 1992–1994, 1996–1998, 2006, 2009)
- Buzz Cooper (Justin Deas, 1993–2009)
- Lucy Cooper Spaulding (Sonia Satra, 1993–1997)
- Marina Cooper (Casey Rosenhaus, 1993–1995; Alysia Zucker, 1995–1996; Sasha Martin, 1996–1999)

Other Characters

- Olivia Spencer Lewis Spaulding Spaulding Lewis, (Crystal Chappell, 1999–2009)
- Father Ray Santos (George Alvarez, 1999–2007, 2008–2009)
- Danny Santos (Paul Anthony Stewart, 1998–2005, 2009)
- Lillian Raines, R.N. (Tina Sloan, 1983–2009)
- Dr. Margaret Sedwick (Margaret Gwenver, 1982–2007)
- Dr. Charles Grant (David Wolos-Fonteno, 1995–2000, 2002, 2003, 2004, 2006)
- Vivian Grant (Petronia Paley, 1992–1999)
- David Grant (Monti Sharp, 1992–1995; Russell Curry, 1995–1996; Terrell Tilford, 1998–2001)
- Dr. Eve Guthrie (Hilary Edson, 1992–2994)
- Dana Jones (Katell Plevin, 1989–1990)
- Rae Rooney (Allison Daugherty, 1990)
- Louisa Young (Holly Marie Combs, 1991–1993, 1994–1995)
- Daniel St. John (David Bishins, 1990–1992)
- Francesca Vizzini (Nadia Capone, 1991)
- Bess Lowell (Elizabeth Lawrence, 1993–1994)
- George (Sherilyn Wolter, 1993–1994)
- Tangie Hill (Marcy Walker, 1993–1995)
- Annie Dutton Bauer Lewis (Cynthia Watros, 1994–1998; Signy Coleman, 1998–1999, 2003)
- Fletcher Reade (Jay Hammer, 1984–1998, 1999, 2003–2004, 2009)
- Gilly Grant Speakes (Amelia Marshall, 1989–1996)
- Hampton Speakes (Vince Williams, 1989–1995)
- Kat Speakes (Nia Long, 1991–1994)
- A.C. Mallet (Mark Derwin, 1990–1993)
- Julie Camaletti (Jocelyn Seagrave, 1991–1994)
- Suzanne Deveraux (Juliet Pritner, 1991–1992)
- Sid Dickerson (Kelly Neal, 1994–1995)
- Abigail Blume Bauer (Amy Ecklund, 1995–2000)
- Marcus Williams (Kevin Mambo, 1995–1998)
- Griffin Williams (Geoffrey C. Ewing, 1995–1998)
- Dahlia Crede (Sharon Leal, 1996–1999)
- Cassie Layne (Laura Wright, 1997–2005)
- Tammy Layne (Katie Sagona, 1997–2002)
- Richard Winslow (Bradley Cole, 1999–2002)
- Edmund Winslow (David Andrew Macdonald, 1999–2005, 2006, 2007, 2009)
- Jesse Blue (Paulo Benediti, 1997–2000)
- Drew Jacobs (Tammy Blanchard, 1997–2000)
- Selena Davis (Patti D'Arbanville, 1998–2000)

== Plot development ==
By the early 1990s, the Bauers, Spauldings, Lewises, and the Coopers had been established as core families in the fictional midwestern city of Springfield. Added to the Coopers (Harley and Frank) were Buzz Cooper, who had abandoned his wife Nadine and their two children, Harley and Frank, after his experiences in the Vietnam War.

The Reardons also returned somewhat at this time, Tony and his wife Annabelle had a son named Tom Reardon (name after Tony's dad Hugh Thomas Reardon) who was born prior to Bea briefly appearing back on the show in 1990 via a video tape recording during daughter Chelsea's failed attempt to marry Johnny Bauer and then again in the guise of Bea Reardon's second son (younger than her son Dr. Jim Reardon, who had been involved in the Dreaming Death and the Barbados-Spaulding storylines and then left in February 1985; but older than Tony), Sean Reardon and his wife Mary's children, Bridget Reardon who was introduced and living for a while with Ed and Maureen (Bridget also had the first child that was a grandson of Roger Thorpe's, Peter Lewis Reardon; Roger's long lost son, Hart Jessup), and also Matthew "Matt" Reardon, Bridget's older brother who ended up having a May–December romance and then marriage with Vanessa after Billy was sent to prison for attempting to murder Roger, in 1994. Bridget and Matt's younger siblings Ryan, Megan and Luke Reardon were mentioned but not seen. Chelsea Reardon left in early 1991. To the dismay of longtime viewers the entire Reardon family returned for Maureen's funeral in 1993. In 1998, it was mentioned that Nola Reardon and Quinton Chamberlain's daughter Stacey was attending college in California.

In August 1989, Dana Jones was introduced. She pretended to be Beth Raines. She later became involved with Rick, but the relationship ended when Rick discovered she had been pretending to be Beth. Dana then became involved with Frank Cooper, resulting in an engagement. During this same time Chelsea Reardon and Johnny Bauer also became engaged, and Chelsea's college friend, and teacher, Rae Rooney came to Springfield to be Chelsea's matron of honor. Chelsea was stalked by an unknown person, originally thought to be a crazed fan of Johnny's, due to Johnny being a talk show host and singer on WSPR-TV. Chelsea nearly lost her life twice, once when she was attacked by someone wielding a pair of gardening shears in a park gazebo, and once when her coffee was poisoned. Dana Jones became chief suspect when Rick caught her impersonating Chelsea. Chelsea was a news anchor at WSPR and Dana just wanted to be like her. Later when Dana paid a visit to the control booth at WSPR she caught Rae about to kill Chelsea, again, and so it was Rae who was the stalker. Rae shot Dana, and Dana was temporarily in a coma, at Cedars Hospital. Chelsea, Rick, Johnny and now private investigator Frank Cooper, were unaware that Rae was the stalker. Rae paid a private visit to Dana's hospital room, and seeing Rae in her room caused Dana to die of shock. In April 1990, Rae attempted to murder Chelsea, isolating her in her apartment. Rae despised Chelsea for supposedly making advances towards Rae's younger brother, Bobby. Bobby had committed suicide while in a mental hospital. Rick, Johnny and Frank were able to deduce the stalker's identity, rescued Chelsea, and Rae was sent to prison. Shortly after this, Chelsea and Johnny were written out, when Johnny left to go to be with Roxie Shayne in Switzerland, and Chelsea left to go on tour as a singer. Johhny's mom Lainie Donovan Bauer died (offscreen) at the end of 1990.

Reintroduced to the show was first a SORASed, Samantha Marler (Suzy Cote) (who got involved with Dylan Lewis, and ended up being severely injured and for a time in a wheelchair, when she threw herself out of the car Reva ended up driving off the bridge to her supposed death), and then Dr. Justin Marler who had since broken up with Helen Manzini returned from India to help both his daughter and his brother, Ross. (Although Justin left in the spring of 1991 when he was cured of his malaria that he had contracted while in India). Samantha departed in 1992.

Blake played both ends against the middle with both Alan-Michael Spaulding (pretending to be pregnant and then pretending to have suffered from a miscarriage), Alan-Michael's older adopted brother, Phillip Spaulding, and her lover from her college days, Gary Swanson who tried to kill at various times in 1990, Alan-Michael, Phillip and Blake, kidnapped both Alan-Michael and Blake, and also killed the man who brought an alive, Beth Raines (now played by Beth Chamberlin) back to Springfield, architect, Neil Everest and tried to set up Phillip as Neil's murderer and almost succeeded, until Roger, Ross and a briefly returned to town, India von Halkein figured out his and Blake's plans (Alan-Michael dumped her, and Blake for a while blamed both her parents and Ross for doing this). Gary ended up going to the same prison as Alan was put in back in the summer of 1989. India mentioned her adopted daughter Dorrie was doing well but that her father Leo Von Halkein had died. This was the only time India mentioned her late mother's Sabina name.

After Long left, Holly and Roger were featured at the forefront, along with Roger's contentious marriage to Alexandra, which culminated in a memorable scene where McKinsey's Alexandra decimated Roger in public. Holly got involved (after suffering from migraine headaches), and almost marry for a short time a dangerous man who almost killed her and Harley Cooper, Dr. Daniel St. John (who originally arrived in town with Justin and helped to make Samantha walk again) who killed his former sister-in-law, Jean Weatherill, by knocking her in the head with his own name plate that Holly gave him as a gift, when Jean threatened to go to Holly about the truth that Daniel had killed his wife and Jean's sister, Carol. Daniel let Blake discover Jean's body that was floating face down in the Country Club pool, and later Daniel shot Roger in the shoulder (but Roger shot Daniel dead), at the Bauer cabin. Daniel also tried to kill Harley Cooper by locking her in the Bauer cabin's root cellar during a blizzard (Harley was rescued by Mallet). Samantha Marler, and Cote, who had clued in Harley about Daniel's rage, ended up leaving shortly after this to go to law school and it was later revealed off-camera that Samantha had become a lawyer like her uncle Ross. Holly instead of turning to Roger, as many people (including Roger) thought, she ended up getting engaged to Ross instead.

In the fall of 1993, another sibling was added to the Cooper Family. Lucy Cooper, who was the product of his off-screen relationship with Sylvie, a woman he'd met years earlier and then later "married" in Arizona. Sylvie (who was identified as being from Sweden) was a nurse Buzz had met while at a VA Hospital. Sylvie died sometime later. Lucy got involved with and later married Alan-Michael Spaulding (who had previously been married to Blake Thorpe—as had Phillip Spaulding—and then Harley Cooper and then Frank's eventual wife, Eleni Andros, a Greek immigrant).

Blake, who still blamed Holly for her divorce from Alan-Michael, plotted to steal her mother Holly's fiancé, Ross Marler, but ended up falling for him, and became somewhat "reformed" (Blake and Ross married in a very memorable wedding in June 1994, with even Roger agreeing to accept this union). Holly ended up for a time becoming addicted to pain relievers and alcohol and nearly accidentally killed herself. Harley Cooper, fresh from heartbreak with Josh Lewis, fell for cop AC Mallet and the two married (A.C. later had an affair with an unnamed woman and the two of them divorced with Harley coming back to the show in 1997; A.C. returned but with a different actor playing him in 2005).

Ross Marler also ran for the U.S. Senate, in the fall of 1992, but in a story that nearly mirrored Bill Clinton's problems in the Presidential election that year, Ross had to contend with someone blackmailing him over his love life with the unpredictable Blake (in a surprising move this blackmailer turned out to be a clean and sober, but very angry Holly—still angry at Blake taking Ross away from her --, not Roger—although Roger took the pictures of Ross and Blake in bed). On the election eve, 1992, episode, Ross had a very interesting dream where he couldn't even buy a vote from anyone in town, including the women characters he had formerly been or currently involved with still on the show (Vanessa, Holly, Nadine and Blake). This dream sequence from Ross was apparently well appreciated by the audience and is one of the things still discussed a great deal on the internet.

Also presented by then-headwriter Nancy Curlee was a great story that still showed the capability of the acting of Maeve Kinkead, when Vanessa charged and rightly so, a fellow businessman, Jack Kiley (Tom Tammi), of attempted rape and sexual harassment (this was shortly after Anita Hill had charged Supreme Court justice Clarence Thomas of nearly the same crimes). Maeve delivered great lines, from Vanessa to Billy, about the unfairness still existing in many businessplaces about the "good ol' boy" network that excluded many otherwise hardworking, well-educated, and capable women—especially those with children or older family members who needed their care. This brought Vanessa closer to Holly, since Holly urged Vanessa to continue to press charges against Kiley.

Curlee, Reilly and others also introduced to Springfield several other new African-American characters that interacted with several characters including already established by Long characters, Gilly Grant and Hampton Speakes, amongst those was Gilly's brother, David Grant, who started out as a criminal but later "reformed" into a private investigator, and Hampton's daughter, Katherine "Kat" Speakes who had a relationship with David, until she went to school in Europe.

Then-Executive Producer Phelps herself was a controversial figure among Guiding Light fans. Actress Beverlee McKinsey played Alexandra Spaulding, Alan's older sister, on Guiding Light during the Pam Long years, and executed an option in her contract that, combined with vacation time she had earned, allowed her to leave the show without giving the show notice. This was a great loss to the show, as McKinsey was part of a triangle of sorts, as the interfering party between her newly found son, originally named Nick McHenry who ended up being the twin of Lujack; and also was a newspaper reporter who was later ensnared to be involved with the corporate intrigue at Spaulding, Enterprises) and his new girlfriend Mindy Lewis. (Eventually, veteran actress Marj Dusay took over the role of Alexandra.) It is widely believed that Phelps didn't read McKinsey's contract and thus allowed the show to lose the legendary actress.

Another move considered a blunder by fans was the death of Maureen Reardon Bauer, played by Ellen Parker, since 1986. Phelps' decision to kill off the character of Maureen was based largely on input by focus groups; however, Maureen's death removed the "tentpole character", which Guiding Light has not had since.

After these two strong stories were either derailed or stopped in their tracks, the show lost its momentum, although into the first few months of 1994 things seemed to be okay, although not great, as such events as Nick's former girlfriend from the fictional war torn country of Cambrai, Dr. Eve Guthrie went insane and tried to kill Mindy, until Eve went to a mental institution and when she got out started a relationship with the lonely Ed (Eve and Ed later married, but Eve was killed off from a chemical warfare induced leukemia in May 1995). Of course Ed didn't get off the hook for the way Mo had died, for it turned out that Mo had discovered that Ed had a one-night stand with her best friend, nurse Lillian Raines, when Lillian had a breast cancer scare, and Mo accused Holly of the affair (since Holly and Ed had an affair back in the first half of 1989), until Mo discovered a letter that Lillian had written to Ed right while Mo was cleaning her kitchen (Ed had apparently dropped the letter near the sink while he was trying to repair some pipes). After Mo died, headwriter Curlee presented a wonderful and powerful scene where Roger Thorpe visited Mo's grave, because Mo was the only one who treated Roger with any sympathy. But later when Roger had decided to fire Holly at WSPR television station, and hooked up with an English woman, and former jewel thief, Jenna Bradshaw, who at first claimed she was another daughter of Henry Chamberlain's and later Jenna got involved with and had a child with the remarried to Nadine, Buzz Cooper), it was Holly who became the sympathetic character as she helped Michelle through her first period, and later found out from Ed that he had a one-night stand with another woman (which totally shocked Holly and isolated the two of them, from each other, for a great while; Holly later found herself falling for and marrying Fletcher Reade and they had a daughter with Down syndrome named Meg). (Roger and Jenna married in the summer of 1993 in a rather gothic setting, with a divorced Jenna later telling Vanessa that she was the "Bride of Thorpestein"). Roger also saved Ed's life, in almost a reversal of what happened in April 1980 when Ed nearly fell off a cliff at a hideaway that Michelle and Holly were staying at. (Of course the person who set this up to happen was, Roger himself). And a little later, in November 1993, Roger threatened Jenna not to leave him while she was pregnant with his child (a child she'd later miscarry). Roger crashed Nick and Mindy's engagement party (with some great scenes of Alexandra and Roger going after each other, vocally, at the Country Club ballroom). And a little later a great mystery was had when Roger was shot and left for dead (he later showed up back alive after getting Holly to treat his wounds and coercing Eve Guthrie to attend to him), at the Country Club's potting shed (this was later revealed to be Billy Lewis, at the time being played by Geoffrey Scott, after Clarke had been arrested for drunk driving in Florida and was then fired by Procter & Gamble; Clarke returned in 1996). Billy mentioned to his half-brother Josh Lewis at this time that Josh was the only brother Billy had left living indicating that Billy's other half-brother Kyle Sampson comatose in a Swiss Clinic since 1987 had indeed died sometime prior to 1994. One other actress who later became famous that was on during this time, was one of the Spaulding's maids (originally started out as Jenna's), who played comic relief on the show, Ginger (played by Allison Janney—later, C.J. Cregg of The West Wing fame) with one of the other Spaulding maids, Donna.

But by the spring of 1994 storylines aimlessly wandered, many revolving solely around characters played by new hires who were close friends to Phelps (several episodes featured nothing more than Justin Deas yelling on a rooftop). In spite of their talent, some of these actors, such as Marcy Walker (Tangie Hill; formerly a ward of Roger Thorpe's), Scott Hoxby who later changed his name to Derek Hoxby (Detective Patrick Cutter) and Veronica Cruz (Gabriella Lopez Grant; who married David for a short time to not be deported), were enormously unpopular with viewers. The storylines themselves were often stagnant and silly, such as Alan's (by then played by Ron Raines) return from prison involving his hiding his face at all times and affecting a fake Japanese accent (he was pretending to be a foreign businessman so he could regain his company), Nick becoming more and more distracted by the power of Spaulding Enterprises, Alan shooting and wounding Alan-Michael (and Tangie acting as Alan-Michael's nurse, but caught in a romantic triangle between the father and son).

Matt and Vanessa keeping their romance a secret from family and friends, and Alan and Jenna using a look alike of Ross' named Howie or "Hoss" (Jerry verDorn in a great dual role) to get to Blake's shares of Spaulding stock.

From early-April through May 1995, A storyline involving Reva's ghost tormenting Josh and his new love Annie Dutton was panned by fans and critics as one of the worst in Guiding Light history.

In March 1995, with rumors of cancellation growing stronger, Kim Zimmer's Reva character returned. As written, she had killed herself five years earlier by driving off a bridge in the Florida Keys during a bout with postpartum depression. With her April 1995 return, Reva was revealed to be an amnesiac living as an Amish woman. Also featured was a storyline about psychotic Brent Lawrence, who had raped Buzz's daughter Lucy and was then presumed dead. Lucy befriended a dowdy woman named Marian. Marian was actually Brent, disguised. The storyline garnered much attention due to some controversial twists such as Marian switching Lucy's AIDS test results to make her think she was HIV-positive, Marian killing Nadine Cooper when she found out the truth and then throwing Nadine's body in the river, killing Det. Cutter while on a "date" and beating an HIV-positive woman, Susan Bates, into a coma. Frank Beaty's bravura performance as Brent/Marian carried the show along for months, but unfortunately Beaty became ill near the climax of his storyline and was temporarily replaced by actor Marc Wolf. Beaty finished out his contract in early 1996 but declined the show's offer of a second contract. Brent Lawrence remains institutionalized to this day.

After the Brent/Marian storyline wrapped, new storylines started. One memorable storyline involved Blake thinking that her twin babies had two different fathers, Rick and Ross (Blake later discovered that Ross sired both.) Dinah Marler, Vanessa and Ross' love child was brought back with Wendy Moniz now in the role in January 1995. Dinah had become penniless after partying her way through Europe and being kicked out of college (for failing grades) in Europe. Dinah tried to extort money out of the trust fund set up by her grandfather, Henry Chamberlain by setting up her own kidnapping (which went awry, with her mother's boyfriend, Matt Reardon saving the day). Dinah also tried to seduce Matt, but it backfired royally. Later, Dinah got involved with and married Roger Thorpe to gain access to her inheritance, with no one showing up to the wedding. Many of these scenes turned into Dinah becoming very agitated and yelling at many of the other characters. Matt and Vanessa did marry in a memorable wedding ceremony, in October 1995. Also In 1995, Lillian Told Ross she was going to Visit her sister Calla Matthews (Ross's ex-lover) who just became a grandmother. Jesse and Simon had a boy They named Brandon after Simon's Half-Brother Lujack. Simon and Lujacks twin Nick met one another (offscreen). Janet Mason Norris's mother Ellen Mason died off screen before Barbara Norris returned to Springfield in early 1995.

In spring 1996, several months after the Brent/Marion storyline ended, Zachary Smith was introduced as a mysterious man trying to repair the lighthouse (which had caught fire several times before this), and later it appeared as though he was an angel who got involved with Michelle Bauer because of her resemblance to Mary who was Meta, Bill and Trudy Cousin and the daughter of Karl and Alice Bauer. Douglas and Ellen (not mentioned since 1986)and Otto and Myra and their son Jack Bauer (not mentioned since 1986 and 1990) were also given brief mentions. The Zachary Smith the Angel storyline was never resolved and Zach Disappeared soon after. In the summer of 1996, Buzz Cooper's Uncle Stavros Kouperkis died offscreen in Greece.

Gilly Grant found out that the man she thought was her biological father, wasn't and then ended up having a brief (and nearly sexual) relationship (although this was stopped by her mother) with the man who was her biological father. Her mother, Vivian, stopped the relationship before it could be consummated.

Brought back in April 1996 was Grant Aleksander, who had left when Phillip married Beth in 1991). Phillip came back looking for which member of the Spaulding family had set him up all those years before.

Roger Thorpe was gaslighted and drugged by his new wife, Dinah Marler-Thorpe, and Roger's son, Hart, who had recently returned.

Amanda Spaulding returned from California as a former madam who counted Matt Reardon as one of her high priced escorts. Amanda later turned out not to Alans daughter after all but to be Brandon Spauldings daughter and that Alexandra had known the truth all these years. This re-written piece history infuriated longtime viewers. Notably because the lack of how the writers did not brush up on the Spaulding and Stafford family history. Amanda's half-siblings Morgan Richards and Matthew Evans and their mother Jennifer (Jane–Marie Stafford) Richards were mentioned but did not return. All three had moved from New York City to Paris France and where not able to be tracked down by Amanda. One of the mayor goofs in this storyline was Jane–Marie's alias and married name Jennifer Richards appearing on Amanda's birth certificate.

In 1996, feeling the show needed a matriarch, Ed's aunt, Meta Bauer returned to Springfield. Although Meta was referred to occasionally, the character had not been seen since 1974. Soap legend Mary Stuart was cast in the role. The move was seen as an attempt to reclaim longtime fans of Guiding Light, as well as Search for Tomorrow, on which Stuart had starred for 35 years. She portrayed the role until her death in 2002.

Nola and Quint were also brought back, separately, but mostly ignored by the writers, and Quint left town in January 1997. Ratings continued to sink.

In 1997 the story zeroed in on Josh Lewis' rocky marriage to Annie Dutton. Annie had once been a sweet nurse (and, at one point, Rick Bauer's wife; although this marriage was later ruled to be illegal, as was the one with Josh, when it was revealed Annie had never even divorced her first husband, Eddie Banks) but had become a pill addict. Annie became a raving lunatic who got artificially inseminated to keep Josh at her side, and pretended to be Reva's long-lost sister to guilt her into staying away. When that didn't work and she also lost her baby, she pushed herself down a flight of stairs at the Spaulding mansion, framing Reva for the death of her fetus. A high-stakes murder trial led Annie to have a meltdown on the witness stand, after which she dramatically collapsed and was rendered barren. This somewhat campy material was bulldozed through by actress, Cynthia Watros, whose performance astonished viewers. Annie, with Alan Spaulding's help, then tried to manipulate Reva's real sister Cassie into breaking up Josh and Reva. Watros left the show in early 1998, after Annie was arrested for her past misdeeds at her and Alan's aborted wedding (and also having her attempting to be defended by another recently new character, attorney and also Ross, Justin and Lainie Marler's long lost surprise half-brother, Ben Warren), leaving a big hole in a show that had been largely centered on the Josh/Reva/Annie storyline.

== 1997 to 1999 ==
During the January 1997 60th anniversary episodes, Mike Bauer (Don Stewart) returned for a few cameo appearances which delighted many longtime fans.

Another storyline during 1997 revolved around the return of Jenna Bradshaw, who had secretly given birth to Buzz' son, Henry Coop Bradshaw (later given the last name of Cooper and going by the name of "Coop"), and Harley Cooper, who had left in September 1993, and who had divorced A.C. Mallett. This storyline involved Jenna's return to being a jewel thief, but now being coerced by the criminal Jeffrey Morgan. To break up the couple and get the goods on Jeffrey, Harley pretended to be a prostitute named, Starla and her pretend boyfriend was Phillip. (Showing great chemistry together, Aleksander and Ehlers were written into having a full blown romance, for Harley and Phillip, after Jeffrey was arrested). Later, Harley and Jenna (working undercover, together) helped Reva and Josh find out from Annie that Alan was working with her to keep the whereabouts of Cassie a secret. Jenna though ended up pregnant with Jeffrey's child, and Harley and Phillip had to contend with the return to town of Beth Raines, who dragged her daughter with Phillip into killing the man who Alan had set Beth up with, in Arizona, who turned out to be very abusive named Carl Stevens.

Rick got involved with and eventually married a hearing impaired woman named, Abigail "Abby" Blume (Amy Cox Ecklund. In real life, Ecklund, who was hearing-impaired in real life, received cochlear implants and regained her hearing. On the show, Abby received the same implants, but her relationship with Rick Bauer eventually ended in divorce and she left Springfield. Roger's father Adam Thorpe died in 1998 after having reconciled with his estranged son Roger, who was now living in California with his new wife Amanda Spaulding. Meta Bauer left Springfield in 1999 for a time to visit her younger sister Trudy in New York City.

Other less well-received storylines in 1997, included Nola's stalking of Buzz (Lisa Brown left in January 1998), Vanessa's pretending to be dead (and briefly running off and hiding in a convent in Switzerland), and Michelle's finding of the recipient of her deceased mother's heart, Jesse Blue, and then falling in love with him. Jesse moved onto Drew Jacobs who turned out to be Ben Warren's long lost daughter via his long ago one night stand with former prostitute Selena Davis. During the course of this storyline Drew searching for her real parents adopted a kid named Max Nickerson and eventually become engaged to Jesse Blue Drew, Jesse and Max were written out in July 2000.Selena Davis left for parts unknown in November 2000 after relaying the news that Drew (who had moved from New York with Max) and Jesse were no longer together and confessing to Blake Marler about her past involvements with Carmen's late Husband Miguel and she giving birth to his illegitimate son Miguel Santos Jr who was given up for adoption and though never mentioned it was strongly hinted at that Danny and Pilar were not Miguels children and that Mick Santos was Selena and Miguel's long lost son. In December 2000 Selena's ex-boyfriend Buzz Cooper mentioned that Selena had been reunited with Drew and Max somewhere out of town. It was strongly hinted that the identity of Ben's long lost father had connections with both Brandon and Alan Spaulding, and possibly their late henchmen Bryan Lister.

In 1998 the writers attempted to bring the long lost branch of the Spaulding family back on the show via Brandons' granddaughter Vickie Brandon Spaulding. Vickie came to town following her mother Victoria Spauldings death (off screen) in Barbados. Victoria's mother Sharina Tamerlaine was also mentioned. It was hinted that Vickie's long lost father was an old business associate of her grandfather Brandon Spaulding. Possibly Stanley Norris (Holly, Ken and Andy's late father) Vickie was involved with the controversial clone story and was a very under-used character for much of her time on the show before all together disappearing back to Barbados in 2001.

In 1998, Esensten and Brown wrote a hotly debated story arc that generated considerable controversy around Guiding Light. Reva, who was believed to be dead a second time, was cloned at the request of her grieving husband Josh. When Reva was found alive, the lonely clone (named Dolly, like the sheep) committed suicide by drinking too much aging serum. As she lay on her death bed (actually a couch), Josh fumbled with a cure that would have reversed the effects of the aging serum. Unfortunately, he dropped it behind the couch and it was too late to save Dolly. The controversial plot alienated erudite, intelligent viewers, and hurt the integrity of a once-intelligent, honored series. It was preceded and then followed by other outlandish storylines that usually featured the character of Reva, such as Reva The Ghost, Reva The Amish Amnesiac, Reva The San Cristobelian Queen, and Reva the Time Traveller.

Blake started carrying on a relationship with Ross' half brother, Ben Warren. When one day Ross arrived home and it appeared as though Ben was trying to rape Blake, Ross tried to shoot Ben with a gun he had bought—but accidentally shot and wounded Blake (with Elizabeth Keifer in a wheelchair for several months). Blake also falsely accused Ben of attempting to rape her, but her guilt got the better of her, and for some time Ross and Blake separated—although they had a daughter, Clarissa, in December 1999.

Holly became an alcoholic after Roger and her husband Fletcher abandoned her, and as the "Nursery Rhyme Stalker" and was partly responsible for the death of the popular Jenna Bradshaw Cooper when Jeffrey Morgan came back to town and Holly let it slip that Jenna's youngest son, Rocky, was really Jeffrey's son and not Buzz', she then kidnapped the children of Springfield, with the help of her older brother, Ken who returned to town in September 1998 and left for parts unknown in February 1999. Holly mentioned in November 1999 that Ken was now living near his daughter Emily in San Diego. Holly and Ken's mother appeared back in Springfield from July 1995 to November 1996 leaving town for parts unknown later to be referenced to have returned to Switzerland. Holly's ex-Fletcher Reade also appeared back on the show briefly in 1999 after Holly was found to be the Nursery Rhyme Stalker. He left again with Meg for Toronto Canada. It was briefly referenced that Fletcher's sister Meredith Reade was also now living in Canada. Fletcher who was presumably contacted off-screen did not return for his adopted son Ben Reade's funeral in 2003.

One of the more successful storylines in the late 1990s was the pairing of Danny Santos and Michelle Bauer. Danny came to town late in 1998 to find his brother Mick's killer. Originally Danny suspected Jesse, but Danny soon discovered that Michelle had killed Mick in self-defense. To protect her from his mother, mob boss Carmen Santos, Danny married Michelle, who at the time was still in love with Jesse. Carmen vowed to break up the marriage and seek revenge on Michelle for Mick's death. What started out as a marriage of convenience turned to love and Michelle and Danny renewed their wedding vows at Laurel Falls. Danny promised to leave the "family business" and start a life with Michelle. Carmen continued to try to break them up and find a way to punish Michelle, including framing her for the murder of Ben Warren.

Annie Dutton returned to Springfield with a new face (Signy Coleman), but after the initial impact, the recast proved unsuccessful and Coleman was written out a year later.

Susan Lemay was turned into a teen terror for a while, and was responsible for burning down her grandfather, Buzz Cooper's Fifth Street Diner.

Reva's time away from Springfield was explained: she had been living on the island nation of San Cristobel as "Princess Catherine".

While flying over the mountains of San Cristobel during a snowstorm, a plane carrying Beth Raines, Jim Lemay (who was becoming romantically involved with Beth) and Phillip Spaulding crashed and stranded the trio. Despite Phillip being married to Harley (and the father of a newborn son with Harley) and Beth with Jim, they thought they were going to die, so he and Beth had sex. Their dalliance produced a son they named James, who until, being SORASed in 2009, had hardly been seen.

== GL ratings: 1990–1999 ==
1989–1990 Season (HH Ratings) (1 HH rating = 921,000 Homes)

- 1. The Young and the Restless 8.0
- 2. General Hospital 7.4
- 7. Guiding Light 5.4

1990–1991 Season (HH Ratings)

- 1. The Young and the Restless 8.1
- 2. General Hospital 6.7
- 7. Guiding Light 5.2

1991–1992 Season (HH Ratings)

- 1. The Young and the Restless 8.2
- 2. All My Children 6.8
- 5. Guiding Light 5.6

1992–1993 Season (HH Ratings)

- 1. The Young and the Restless 8.4
- 2. All My Children 7.3
- 7. Guiding Light 5.4

1993–1994 Season (HH Ratings) (1 HH rating = 942,000 Homes)

- 1. The Young and the Restless 8.6
- 2. All My Children 6.6
- 8. Guiding Light 5.4

1994–1995 Season (HH Ratings)

- 1. The Young and the Restess 7.5
- 2. All My Children 6.1
- 8. Guiding Light 4.4

1995–1996 Season (HH Ratings)

- 1. The Young and the Restless 7.7
- 2. Days of our Lives 5.8
- 8. Guiding Light 4.0

1996–1997 Season

- 1. The Young and the Restless 7.1
- 2. Days of our Lives 5.8
- 7. Guiding Light 4.0

1997–1998 Season

- 1. The Young and the Restless 6.8
- 7. Guiding Light 4.0

1998–1999 Season HH Ratings

- 1. The Young and the Restless 6.9
- 8. Guiding Light 3.5
