= Speakes =

Speakes is an English surname. It may refer to:

== People ==
- Larry Speakes (1939–2014), an acting press spokesman for the White House under President Reagan
- Stephen M. Speakes (b. 1952), a United States Army lieutenant general

== Fictional characters ==
- The Speakeses, a family in the soap opera Guiding Light, including Hampton (Vince Williams), Kathryn (Nia Long) and Gilly Speakes (Amelia Marshall).
