= Stephanie Gatschet =

American actress (born 1983)

- Born: Stephanie Lucile Gatschet; March 16, 1983 (age 43); Philadelphia, Pennsylvania, U.S.
- Occupation: Actress
- Years active: 1991–present
- Notable work: Guiding Light

Stephanie Lucile Gatschet (born March 16, 1983, in Philadelphia, Pennsylvania) is an actress, who has appeared on the soap operas Guiding Light (as Tammy Winslow) and All My Children (as Madison North).

== Early life and education ==
As a child, Gatschet took ballet, piano, and acting lessons. Her professional career began at the age of nine, when she appeared in her first play, Oedipus the King, at a local Philadelphia theatre. After performing in a few local plays, Gatschet began to appear in theatrical productions off-Broadway in New York City. She attended Julia R. Masterman School in Philadelphia, for middle school and high school. She also began to make commercials for television and radio, and to make episodic TV appearances in shows such as As the World Turns and Law & Order.

Prior to her role on Guiding Light, Gatschet was pursuing a Bachelor of Fine Arts at the Tisch School of the Arts at NYU. During her first year of college at New York University, Gatschet won roles in a few independent feature films like Roger Dodger and Virgin.

== Career ==
Gatschet is best known for her portrayal of Tammy Layne Winslow, the daughter of Cassie Layne Winslow and her ex-husband, Rob Layne, on the CBS soap opera Guiding Light. She portrayed the character from July 2002 to March 2007.

In 2007, Gatschet earned a Daytime Emmy Award nomination for Outstanding Younger Actress in a Drama Series.

On June 19, 2009, Gatschet began portraying a new character, Madison North, on All My Children on a recurring status. In December 2009, she signed a long-term contract and moved with the soap opera's production from New York to Los Angeles.

In 2015, Gatschet joined her friend and actor, Paul Gosselin, in the digital series, Misguided. She portrays an exaggerated version of herself.

== Personal life ==
She is also a member of the Humane Society.

== Filmography ==
Television roles
Year	Title	Role	Notes
1991	As the World Turns	N/A	1 episode
2002	Law & Order	Matty Helder	1 episode
2002–2008	Guiding Light	Tammy Winslow Randall	Contract role: July 5, 2002 – February 21, 2007; May 4 – 21, 2007; January 22 – February 28, 2008
2007	Guiding Light	Herself	1 episode
2009–2011	All My Children	Madison North	Contract role: June 19, 2009 – September 23, 2011
2015–2019	Misguided	Stephanie	Series Regular

Film roles
Year	Title	Role	Notes
2001	Needle in a Haystack	Penny Broderick	
2001	Revolution #9	Young Model	
2002	Roger Dodger	Angela	
2003	Virgin	Katie Reynolds	
2009	Dirty Movie	The wife	
