= Susan Pratt =

American actress

- Other names: Susan O'Hanlon, Susan Pratt O'Hanlon
- Occupation: Actress
- Years active: 1976–present
- Spouses: George O'Hanlon Jr. (m. 1978; div. 1980) Alfredo Pecora (m. 1981)
- Children: 3

Susan Pratt is an American actress.

Pratt is best known for her roles in daytime television as Anne Logan on General Hospital (1978–1982), Claire Ramsey on Guiding Light (1983–1986, 2000–2002), and Barbara Montgomery on All My Children (1987–1991, 1995, 1997, 1998, February 9-July 12, 2007). She was also credited as Susan O'Hanlon in the role of Captain Nicole Davidoff (16 episodes, 1978–1980) in the Saturday morning series, Jason of Star Command.

== Career ==
Pratt started her career in 1976, and many of her roles were on daytime television. Those roles include sweet nurse Anne Logan (Audrey Hardy's niece) on General Hospital (1978–1982), tough doctor Claire Ramsey (who had an affair with Ed Bauer, giving birth to his daughter, Michelle) on Guiding Light (1983–1986, 2000–2002), and ambitious businesswoman Barbara Montgomery (Travis's ex-wife who married Tom Cudahy but continued to sleep with Travis) on All My Children (1987–1991, 1995, 1997, 1998, February 9-July 12, 2007). She had short-term roles on Loving and As the World Turns before making return appearances to both "AMC" and "GL". For her role as Barbara Montgomery Cudahy, she received a Soap Opera Digest Nomination for Best Supporting Actress.

== Personal life ==
Pratt has been married twice. She was married to George O'Hanlon Jr. from 1976 until their divorce in 1980. In 1981, she married Alfredo Pecora. The couple have three children together: Sophia Pecora, Giancarlo Pecora, and Lorenna Pecora.

== Filmography ==
=== Film ===
Year	Title	Role	Notes
1985	When Nature Calls		
1991	Maximum Breakout	Frat Girl	
1997	Private Parts	Stewardess	

=== Television ===
Year	Title	Role	Notes
1976	Shazam!	Dorothy Kaufman	Season 3, Episode 3: "Ripcord"
1976	The Streets of San Francisco	Tina Wells	Season 5, Episode 4: "The Drop"
1976	Welcome Back, Kotter	Jenny Hansen	Season 2, Episode 7: "Sweathog, Nebraska Style"
1977	Baretta	Street Girl	Season 3, Episode 15: "Open Season"
1977	The Hardy Boys/Nancy Drew Mysteries	Ann	Season 1, Episode 10: "The Mystery of the Fallen Angels"
1977	Carter Country	Beth	Season 1, Episode 2: "Beating the Pounds"
1978-82	General Hospital	Anne Logan	
1978–1980	Jason of Star Command	Captain Nicole Davidoff	Credited as Susan O'Hanlon, 16 episodes
1983-1986; 2000-2002	Guiding Light	Claire Ramsey	List of Guiding Light cast members
1987-1991; 1997; 2007	All My Children	Barbara Montgomery	
1994	Loving	Elizabeth Barnes	List of Loving cast and characters
1994	The Cosby Mysteries	Betsy Walkner	Episode: "The Lottery Winner Murders"
1999	As the World Turns	Charlotte Lindsey	List of As the World Turns cast members
