= Nancy Curlee =

American soap opera writer

Nancy Curlee is an American soap opera writer. She was head writer of Guiding Light from 1990 to 1994. Her time at the helm of GL is often considered a golden period for the show.

Curlee is married to fellow soap opera writer Stephen Demorest. She retired to be a full-time mother. She has been nominated for several Daytime Emmy Awards. In 1993, Curlee and her GL writing team won the Daytime Emmy for Outstanding Drama Series Writing Team.

Her last GL writing team consisted of Stephen Demorest, Lorraine Broderick, James E. Reilly, Nancy Williams Watt, Michael Conforti, Bill Elverman, James Harmon Brown and Barbara Esensten, Roger Newman, Trent Jones, N. Gail Lawrence, Pete T. Rich, Sally Mandel, Patrick Mulcahey, Dorothy Ann Purser, Peggy Schibi, Courtney Simon, and Wisner Washam

== Positions held ==
Guiding Light

- Co-head writer: January 14, 1991 – January 14, 1992; December 15, 1992 - March 14, 1994
- Breakdown Writer: 1987 - January 11, 1991
- Script Writer: 1985 - January 10, 1991

ABC Daytime

- Story Consultant: 1996 - 1998

== Awards and nominations ==
Daytime Emmy Awards

WINS

- (1986, 1990 & 1993; Best Writing; Guiding Light)

NOMINATIONS

- (1989 & 1992; Best Writing; Guiding Light)

Writers Guild of America Award

WINS

- (1992 season; Guiding Light)

NOMINATIONS

- (1989 & 1995 seasons; Guiding Light)
