= Christopher Bernau =

American actor (1940–1989)

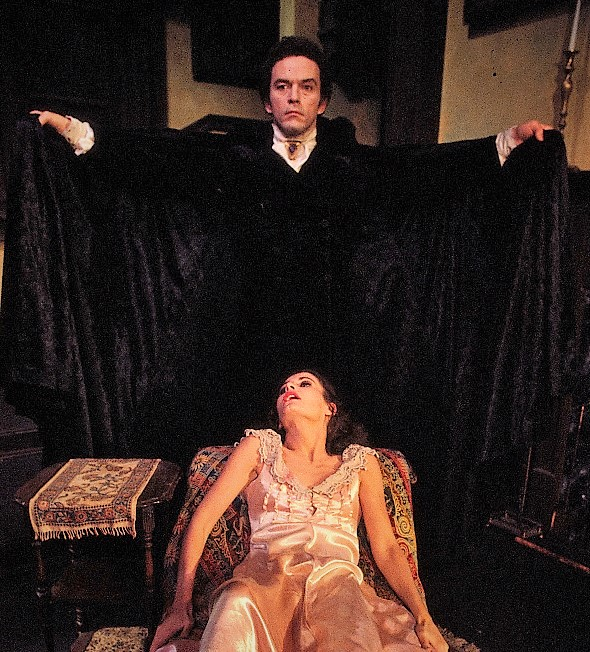
- Bernau with Giulia Pagano in The Passion of Dracula, at the Cherry Lane Theatre in New York City in 1977
- Born: Herbert Augustine Bernau; June 2, 1940; Santa Barbara, California, United States
- Died: June 14, 1989 (aged 49); New York, New York
- Occupation: Actor
- Years active: 1962–1988

Christopher Bernau (born Herbert Augustine Bernau, June 2, 1940 – June 14, 1989) was an American actor, best known for his portrayals as Philip Todd on Dark Shadows and later as the first Alan Spaulding on Guiding Light.

== Life and career ==
Christopher Bernau was born in Santa Barbara, California to Herbert Bernau, a physiotherapist, and Emma Bernau (née Vercellino), a homemaker. Bernau showed a love for the theatre at an early age, and was frequently cast in high school plays.

Bernau trained in the drama department at the University of California before getting his big break, appearing in the New York Shakespeare Festival's production of Antony and Cleopatra in 1962. He continued in that role until 1964, when he toured nationally in the production of Who's Afraid of Virginia Woolf? These roles, in addition to performing at Canada's Stratford Festival, led to an appearance in a brief story arc on Dark Shadows in 1969 and 1970, where he portrayed Philip Todd.

His most famous role, however, was that of villain Alan Spaulding on the soap opera Guiding Light, a role he played from 1977 to 1984 and again from 1986 until 1988. He left the show due to illness shortly before his death in 1989.

Though Bernau's famous character Alan was portrayed as a habitual womanizer, Bernau is considered to be one of the only truly "out" soap opera actors, as it was fairly well known by both the actors he worked with and the soap press at large that he was gay.

== Death ==
Bernau was diagnosed with HIV but continued to work on Guiding Light. He left the show in the summer of 1988, when he became too ill to show up at work, with his role being recast with Daniel Pilon.

Bernau died of a heart attack brought on by complications from AIDS on June 14, 1989, at St. Luke's-Roosevelt Hospital (now Mount Sinai West) in New York City at the age of 49. At first, Bernau's AIDS diagnosis was kept private, with his death certificate listing 'natural causes' as the cause of his death. He is buried at Santa Barbara Cemetery.

== Filmography ==
- Dark Shadows (1969–1970) (Phillip Todd/Opening Voiceover)
- Broadway on Showtime (1980) (Dracula)
- Guiding Light (1977–1988) (Alan Spaulding)
