= Hilary Edson =

American actress

- Occupation: Actress

Hilary Edson is an actress who has appeared in several daytime television soap operas.

== Early years ==
Edson is a native of Sewickley, Pennsylvania. She attended Sewickley Academy and Tufts University but left Tufts to pursue a career in acting. She studied acting while working in New York University's film department in the summer of 1983.

== Career ==
Edson's unsuccessful screen test for a role on The Edge of Night led to her being selected to act on General Hospital. From 1984 to 1987, Edson played Tania Roskov Jones on General Hospital. She then portrayed Stacey Winthrop on Another World from 1989 to 1991. She began a three-year stint on Guiding Light in 1992 as Eve Guthrie and was nominated for a Daytime Emmy Award for Best Supporting Actress in 1994.
