= Jeff Phillips (trainer) =

American fitness trainer (born 1968)

Jeff Phillips (born July 3, 1968) is an American fitness trainer, founder of Jeff Phillips Fitness, specializing in whole body wellness and former actor best known for his work on Guiding Light, As the World Turns and the 1996 film Independence Day.

== Early life ==
Phillips was born on July 3, 1968, in Westwood, New Jersey, as the second of three children, and raised in Hillsdale, New Jersey, where he attended Pascack Valley High School. After attending Ramapo College for a year as a criminal justice major, he decided to turn his attention to acting. He first started his career in theatre in 1990, performing in small plays and traveling back and forth between his home in New Jersey and Los Angeles for auditions while working for a construction company at home.

== Career ==
=== Acting ===
After traveling back and forth between home in New Jersey and auditions in Los Angeles, Phillips caught his big break in 1991, landing a role on Guiding Light, and earning a daytime Emmy Award nomination and Soap Opera Digest Awards nomination. He then landed the role of Kevin Marshall in the soap opera, As the World Turns and had a recurring role as Whip Morgan in the series, The Adventures of Brisco County, Jr. In 1996, Phillips was cast in the film, Independence Day. He then appeared in a number of television shows such as High Tide, Pacific Blue and Pensacola: Wings of Gold before landing recurring roles in Another World and ER. From 2002-2007, Phillips made appearances on television shows, including Fastlane, The Handler, Third Watch and CSI: Miami. In 2010, Phillips was cast in a recurring role as Nick Pearson, in the soap opera, All My Children.

=== Fitness ===
After his acting career, Phillips worked in New Jersey, running and directing a skiing school. After numerous gym session requests and a personal dedication to fitness, Phillips decided to make a career out of fitness training. His first client was Eileen Ryan Penn, mother of Sean Penn, inspiring him to expand his company and build his clientele by word of mouth, specifically through the contacts he had acquired through his acting career.

Jeff's training methods are influenced by Tony Norton, Gunther Peterson, and Tracey Anderson, using a combination of resistance training, yoga, and cardiovascular conditioning. Jeff Phillips Fitness is based in Los Angeles, California, and includes an extensive client list including top Hollywood agents, managers, publicists, executives, and actors such as Joanna Cassidy, Emily Osment, Michelle Stafford, and Daniel Davis.
