= Ray Santos (Guiding Light) =

- Guiding Light character
- Portrayed by: George Alvarez; Jaime Passer
- First appearance: February 17, 1999
- Last appearance: 2009

Father Ray Santos is a fictional character on CBS's daytime drama Guiding Light. He has been portrayed on a recurring basis by George Alvarez since March 30, 1999. The role was portrayed from February 17 to 19, 1999 by Jaime Passer.

== Character information ==
Ray was born into the Santos crime family but managed to keep himself out of the family business. Choosing the priesthood still allowed him to stay close to his family and he remained their trusted confidant. This wasn't without a cost and Father Ray has had to struggle with his conscience on numerous occasions to stay true to his vows. He aided his cousin Danny and wife Michelle in their flight to San Cristobel to escape murder charges and became the moral adviser to his gangster brother Tony, becoming mixed up in his love affairs with Marah Lewis and Catalina Quesada. Always keeping his distance, Ray managed to steer his family on the right path more often than not. The character is presumed to have left Springfield sometime in 2007.

Ray came back to Springfield in late of 2008 to assist in helping out Reva Shayne Lewis and Natalia Rivera & he has been in Springfield ever since. On July 4, 2009, he went to the annual Bauer barbecue party. He was reunited with his cousin Danny, his cousin-in-law Michelle and his niece and nephew - Robert & Hope. He also tried to help out Natalia, who blames herself still for being with Olivia instead of being with Frank Cooper. The stress of this moral conflict within Olivia is taking a toll on her pregnancy and on her relationship with her son, Rafe.
