= Maureen Garrett =

American actress (born 1948)

- Born: 1948 (age 77–78); Rocky Mount, North Carolina, United States
- Spouse: Divorced [source missing]
- Children: 3

Maureen Garrett (born Maureen Mason Garrett; 1948 in Rocky Mount, North Carolina) is an American actress.

Garrett played the role of Holly Norris on Guiding Light, a role she inherited from Lynn Deerfield in 1976. For many years, the character of Holly was featured in a psychologically complex story with Roger Thorpe, played by Michael Zaslow. Villain Roger had, among other things, raped Holly while they were married. The couple of Roger and Holly is considered one of Guiding Light's most memorable couples. In 1980, Garrett left Guiding Light to pursue prime-time television and film. She returned to Guiding Light in the late 80s and continued as a recurring character until the show ended in 2009.

She speaks German and French. She studied at LMU Munich in Germany, and at Temple and Villanova Universities in Pennsylvania, United States.

She has been nominated for three Daytime Emmy awards for Outstanding Supporting Actress in a Drama Series for her role of Holly Norris in 1991, 1992 and 1994 respectively; and has also been nominated for three Soap Opera Digest Awards.

In addition to her role on Guiding Light, she also portrayed the character of Elizabeth Jane "EJ" Ryan on Ryan's Hope. She was instrumental in creating a theater company including her GL castmates performing other works.

In a 2012 interview with Out, Garrett revealed she is a lesbian and had been with her then partner J M Morgan for 20 years. They have three sons.
