= Vince Williams (actor) =

American actor (1957–1997)

- Born: July 11, 1957; Natchitoches, Louisiana, U.S.
- Died: January 6, 1997 (aged 39); Englewood, New Jersey, U.S.
- Education: Northwestern State University
- Spouse: Kathryn Hunter (m.1987)
- Children: 2

Vince Williams (July 11, 1957 – January 6, 1997) was an American actor. He was best known for playing the role of Hampton Speakes on the CBS soap opera Guiding Light from 1989 to 1995.

== Early life ==
Williams was born in Natchitoches, Louisiana. His father was a school principal and his mother was a teacher. He had three sisters and three brothers. Williams was a lifelong musician. He first picked up a trumpet when he was in the second grade, but he struggled to play it because he was a frail child. A few years later, his mother bought him a flute for Christmas. At age eleven, Williams took his brother's saxophone from his closet and began to teach himself to play. He became a gifted saxophonist, eventually incorporating it into his role on Guiding Light.

Williams graduated from Northwestern State University with a bachelor of arts degree. He was encouraged to pursue law, and took acting classes to prepare for it. He then attended Florida State University, receiving a master's degree in fine arts. He also studied at Southern University and the Southern Jazz Institute.

== Career ==
After college, Williams moved to New York. He joined a culturally diverse Shakespearean company that performed for public schools.

Williams made his Broadway debut as Lyons in August Wilson's Fences at the 46th Street Theatre from February 2, 1988 to June 26, 1988. He started as an understudy in the production. He co-starred with Billy Dee Williams.

He briefly appeared as Lamar Griffin on As the World Turns. Williams was then cast as Hampton Speakes on Guiding Light, playing the role from 1989 to 1995. He was the first African-American actor to be on contract on Guiding Light. He then played Dustin Carter on Another World from late 1996 until his death.

== Personal life and death ==
Williams was introduced to Kathryn Hunter in 1986, by a mutual friend who was part of the Shakespeare company he was involved in. They married and had two sons.

He died January 6, 1997, in Englewood, New Jersey from colon cancer. His youngest son was only eight months old at the time of his death.
