= Guiding Light (2000–2009) =

American soap opera

Guiding Light (GL) is an American soap opera from 2000-2009. It was the longest-running American soap opera.

== Show development ==
=== 2000 - 2004 ===
Claire Labine took over as head writer in 2000, but her stories focused on character development and reportedly clashed with Rauchs's plot-heavy style. Labine's team lasted a year, and she was briefly replaced by Lloyd Gold. Millee Taggart took over as the writer, and her tenure received critical acclaim for breaking away from the organized crime and royalty themes that had dominated Guiding Light in recent years.

In early 2003, veteran producer John Conboy and Ellen Weston took charge of the show. Weston had acted on Guiding Light, and had several prime-time movie writing credits, but had never been a head writer for a soap opera. Conboy's first move was to demote several veteran performers, including Maureen Garrett, Beth Chamberlin and Elizabeth Keifer, to recurring status. However, Conboy and Weston were fired after only a year.

Ellen Wheeler, known for her work on Another World and All My Children became executive producer in the spring of 2004. Her regime addressed unresolved plotlines, and she and writer David Kreizman initially received praise from viewers and critics. In 2005, the show won the Writers Guild of America Award for Best Written Daytime Serial, being the only one nominated. But the show's ratings continued to stagnate and in early 2005, it was revealed that Procter & Gamble had ordered Guiding Light to take a large budget cut. The actors themselves would also see a reduction in salary, and long-time stars Michael O'Leary, Jerry verDorn, and Marj Dusay were taken off contract. As a result of being dropped to recurring, verDorn, at that time the longest running Guiding Light actor and character (Ross Marler), left the show and joined ABC's One Life to Live.

Nancy St. Alban, Doug Hutchinson, Paul Anthony Stewart and David Andrew MacDonald were fired as a result of the budget cuts. Stephen Martines asked for and was granted a release from his contract. Daniel Cosgrove, who played Bill Lewis since 2002 opted not to renew his contract and also left the show, but would return again in 2007 with a new three-year contract. The show moved to the old As the World Turns studios on the West Side of Manhattan.

=== 2005 - 2009 ===
On November 14, 2005, Guiding Light introduced a new opening sequence, the first few scenes were presented in widescreen and then followed by a new opening theme song with new video clips, a new logo, and a new musical tune. Episodes became downloadable at CBS.com as a podcast a few hours after their broadcast. Around this time, Guiding Light's sets also changed considerably. Longtime sets such as Company, Josh and Reva Lewis's House, and Cedars Hospital received makeovers, and the Beacon Hotel lobby set were scrapped. The show added a new "Main Street" set which features an outdoor coffee bar (CO_{2} or Company 2) and a new theater. Guiding Light also made over the Cross Creek cabin set and moved the cabin to Springfield for Josh and Reva.

In March 2006, the producers attempted to get Michael O'Leary, Beth Chamberlin, and Elizabeth Keifer to return to contract status. All three turned the offer down, after they were only guaranteed one appearance each week. In June 2006, following his Emmy win, Jordan Clarke was upgraded to contract status. Around this same time, O'Leary ended up changing his mind and signed his own new contract with the show.

In 2007, the show celebrated its 70th anniversary with two special episodes. The first episode aired on January 25 and the second appeared on February 14, depicting the actors' trip to Biloxi, Mississippi to aid in rebuilding three homes damaged by Hurricane Katrina. The theme for the 70th anniversary, "Find Your Light", attempted to return the show to its roots of giving back to the community.

Starting in January 2008, Guiding Light moved from the traditional multi-camera style of filming to hand-held digital cameras. All of the show's traditional sets were scuttled and new four-wall sets were erected in their place, as well as two new permanent outdoor filming locations in New Jersey. Executive producer Ellen Wheeler was quoted in the New York Post as saying that the show didn't feel real, and that the show's new production style would have a completely different and more realistic look.

On an August 29, 2008 episode of Guiding Light, actors Adam West and Burt Ward (two Batman castmates) made their special guest appearances.

On April 1, 2009, CBS announced that Guiding Light would end after 57 years on television. The final episode on the network aired on September 18, 2009.

== Plot development ==
A focus of the show during this decade was a continuation of stories from the earlier introduction of San Cristobel. Richard and Reva discovering they have a son named Jonathan, who had been hidden away to protect him from evil Edmund. Jonathan was being raised by Richard's ex-lover, Olivia's sister, and her husband. Cassie marries Richard and Richard's evil brother Edmund plots to keep them apart. Richard abdicates his throne after discovering that he is illegitimate.

Democratic elections held a few weeks later to decide San Cristobel's political fate are halted in a coup by Edmund, who has himself crowned prince and ruler. After his coronation, he marries Springfielder Beth Raines. Edmund is later deposed by Richard using an army of mercenaries paid for by Beth's ex-husband, Phillip Spaulding. Edmund escapes the island to avoid a trial and the island becomes a democracy with Richard as the elected president. Another election is held less than a year later after a heretofore unknown Winslow son, Prince William aka Alonzo Baptiste, is discovered. This time the people vote to have the monarchy restored under Alonzo, who quickly divorces and exiles his scheming wife Camille Baptiste (who would later perish in a car accident in Europe) and allows Richard and Cassie to keep their adopted son Will.

Another story focus is on the Santos family and the Mob, specifically Michelle Bauer's mobster husband Danny Santos, his sister Pilar, and cousin Tony, and Danny's sociopathic mother, Carmen. Much of Danny and Michelle's story involves fighting against the evil Carmen, until Carmen is injured during a fight with Michelle in 2002. She goes into a coma and is later transferred to a Switzerland clinic, where she dies.

== Cast ==
=== Complete cast members ===
Actor	Character	Status
Grant Aleksander	Phillip Spaulding (#2)	1982–1984, 1986–1991, 1996–2004, 2005, 2009
Murray Bartlett	Cyrus Foley	2007–2009
Laura Bell Bundy	Marah Lewis	1999–2001
Robert Bogue	Anthony "Mallet" Camalletti (#2)	2005–2009
E.J. Bonilla	Rafael "Rafe" Rivera	2007–2009
Beth Ann Bonner	Natasha	2009
Jeff Branson	Joshua "Shayne" Lewis (#7)	2008–2009
Lisa Brown	Nola Reardon Chamberlain	1980–1985, 1995–1998, 2009
Mandy Bruno	Marina Cooper (#6)	2004–2009
Crystal Chappell	Olivia Spencer	1999–2009
Jordan Clarke	Harlan Billy "Billy" Lewis II (#1)	1983–1987, 1989–1993, 1996, 1996–1998, 1999–2009
Bradley Cole	Richard Winslow	1999–2002
Bradley Cole	Jeffrey O'Neill	2003–2009
Zack Conroy	James Spaulding (#3)	2009
Daniel Cosgrove	Harlan Billy "Bill" Lewis III (#4)	2002–2005, 2007–2009
Justin Deas	Frank "Buzz" Cooper Sr.	1993–2009
Bonnie Dennison	Susan "Daisy" Lemay (#3)	2007–2009
Frank Dicopoulos	Frank Cooper Jr.	1987–2009
Morgan Englund	Dylan Lewis (#1)	1989–1995, 1997, 1999, 2002, 2006, 2009
Maureen Garrett	Holly Norris (#2)	1976–1980, 1988–2003, 2003–2006, 2009
Jay Hammer	Fletcher Reade	1984–1998, 1999, 2009
Melissa Hayden	Bridget Reardon Lewis	1991–1997, 2009
Teresa Hill	Eden August	2002–2003
Jessica Leccia	Natalia Rivera	2007–2009
David Andrew MacDonald	Edmund Winslow	1999–2005, 2006, 2007, 2009
Amelia Marshall	Gilly Grant	1989–1996, 2006, 2009
Karla Mosley	Christina Moore Boudreau	2008–2009
Robert Newman	Joshua "Josh" Lewis	1981–1984, 1986–1991, 1993–2009
Michael O'Leary	Frederick "Rick" Bauer (#5)	1983–1986, 1987–1991, 1995–2009
Tom Pelphrey	Jonathan Randall	2004–2007, 2008, 2009
Ron Raines	Alan Spaulding (#3)	1994–2009
Jennifer Roszell	Eleni Andros Cooper (#2)	1995–1999, 2001–2002, 2006, 2008–2009
Marcy Rylan	Elizabeth "Lizzie" Spaulding Lewis (#6)	2006–2009
Lawrence Saint-Victor	Remy Boudreau (#3)	2006–2009
Peter Simon	Dr. William "Ed" Bauer Jr. (#4)	1981–1984, 1986–1996, 2002–2004, 2009
Nancy St. Alban	Michelle Bauer Santos (#5)	2000–2005, 2009
Paul Anthony Stewart	Danny Santos	1998–2005, 2009
Krista Tesreau	Mindy Lewis (#1)	1983–1989, 2002, 2004, 2009
Gina Tognoni	Dinah Marler (#4)	2004–2009
Caitlin Van Zandt	Ashlee Wolfe	2006–2009
Kim Zimmer	Reva Shayne O'Neill	1983–1990, 1995–2009

=== Recurring cast members ===
Actor	Character	Duration
George Alvarez	Ray Santos	1999–2007, 2008–2009
Kim Brockington	Dr. Felicia Boudreau	2002–2004, 2006, 2008–2009
Orlagh Cassidy	Doris Wolfe	1999–2002, 2004–2009
Beth Chamberlin	Elizabeth "Beth" Raines	1989–1991, 1993–1994, 1996–2009
Tyra Colar	Leah Bauer	2008–2009
Carey Cromelin	Wanda Hyatt	1987–1991, 2006–2009
Olivia Dicopoulos	Maureen Reardon	2007–2009
Marj Dusay	Alexandra Spaulding	1993–1997, 1998–1999, 2002–2009
Patrick Gilbert	Robert "Robbie" Santos	2003–2005, 2009
Peter Francis James	Clayton Boudreau	2003–2004, 2006, 2009
Elizabeth Keifer	Christina "Blake" Thorpe Marler	1992–2009
Maeve Kinkead	Vanessa Chamberlain Reardon Lewis	1980–1981, 1982–1987, 1989–2000, 2002, 2005, 2006–2009
Kurt McKinney	Matt Reardon	1994–2000, 2002, 2005, 2006–2009
Narlee Rae	Clarissa Marler	2008–2009
Gil Rogers	Hawk Shayne	1985–1992, 1995–1997, 1999, 2002, 2004, 2005, 2006, 2008–2009
Tina Sloan	Lillian Raines Cooper	1983–2009
Cally & Brooke Tarleton	Hope Santos	2005, 2009
Jacqueline Tsirkin	Emma Spencer-Spaulding	2007–2009
Yvonna Wright	Melissande "Mel" Boudreau	2001–2009
Cory Zimmer	Rebecca Scott Donnelly	1950–2009
Janet Aldrich	Suzy the Escort	1984–1986
Adam West	Himself	2008
Burt Ward	Himself	2008

== Reception ==
=== Guiding Light ratings: 2000–2009 ===
1999–2000 Season (HH Ratings)

- 1. The Young and the Restless (6.8)
- 8. Guiding Light 3.6

2000–2001 Season

- 1. The Young and the Restless (5.8)
- 6. Guiding Light 3.4

2001–2002 Season

- 1. The Young and the Restless (5.0)
- 8. Guiding Light 3.0

2002–2003 Season

- 1. The Young and the Restless (4.7)
- 8. Guiding Light 2.6

2003–2004 Season

- 1. The Young and the Restless (4.4)
- 8. Guiding Light 2.4

2004–2005 Season

- 1. The Young and the Restless (4.2)
- 8. Guiding Light 2.3

2005–2006 Season HH Ratings

- 1. The Young and the Restless (4.2)
- 8. Guiding Light 2.2

2006–2007 Season

- 1. The Young and the Restless (4.2)
- 8. Guiding Light 2.1

2007–2008 Season

- 1. The Young and the Restless (3.9)
- 8. Guiding Light 1.8

2008–2009 Season

- 1. The Young and the Restless (3.7)
- 8. Guiding Light 1.6
