= List of Guiding Light characters =

This is a list of characters who have appeared on the soap opera Guiding Light.

== A ==
=== Sunny Adelman ===
Fay Wolf (2000)

=== Gus Aitoro (deceased) ===
Ricky Paull Goldin (2001–2008)

=== Brad Andrews ===
Brendan Wentworth (1997–1998)

=== Leslie Ann Andrews (deceased) ===
Carolyn Ann Clark (1981–1984)

=== Warren Andrews ===
Warren Burton (1983–1987)

=== Eleni Andros ===
see Eleni Andros Cooper

=== Eden August ===
Teresa Hill (2002–2003)
Deborah Zoe (2003–2004)

=== Madame Ava ===
Marian Seldes (1998)

=== Brad Andrews ===
Brendan Wentworth (1997-1998)

Jack Armstrong (1985)

== B ==
=== Clarence Bailey ===
Philip Bosco (1979)
Larry Weber (1982)

District Attorney.

=== Diane Ballard (deceased) ===
Sofia Landon Geier (1977–1981)

=== Eddie Banks ===
Robert Leeshock (1998)

=== Bruce Banning ===
Les Damon (1952; 1956–1960)

=== Susan Bates Spaulding ===
Nancy Bell (1995–1996)

=== Bertha "Bert" Bauer (deceased) ===
Ann Shepard (1949–1950)
Charita Bauer (1950–1984)

=== Bill Bauer (deceased) ===
Lyle Sudrow (1952–1959)
Ed Bryce (1959–1963; 1965–1969; 1977–1978; 1983)
Eugene Smith (1964)

=== Ed Bauer ===
Pat Collins (1954–1961)
Robert Gentry (1966–1969; 1997–1998)
Mart Hulswit (1969–1981)
Peter Simon (1981–1984; 1986–1996; 2002–2004; 2009)
Richard Van Vleet (1984–1986)

=== Maureen Reardon Bauer (deceased) ===
Ellen Dolan (1982–1986)
Ellen Parker (1986–93; 1997–2000; 2004–05)

=== Friedrich "Papa" Bauer (deceased) ===
Theodore von Eltz (1948–1949)
Theo Goetz (1949–1973)

=== Gertrude "Trudy" Bauer ===
Laurette Fillbrant (1948–1949)
Charlotte Holland (1949–1951)
Helen Wagner (1952)
Lisa Howard (1957–1958)

=== Hillary Bauer (deceased) ===
Linda McCullough (1977–1978)
Marsha Clark (1978–1984)

=== Hope Bauer ===
Jennifer Kirschner (1963–1965)
Paula Schwartz (1968)
Elisa Leeds (1968–1973)
Tisch Raye (1975–1976)
Robin Mattson (1976–1977)
Katherine Justice (1977)
Elvera Roussel (1979–1983)

=== Jack Bauer ===
Alan North (1988)

=== Johnny Bauer ===
James Goodwin (1986–1990)

=== Jude Cooper Bauer ===
Aaron Hart (2005–2007)
Robert Danza, Jr (2007–2008)

=== Lacey Bauer ===
Zoe Trilling (1987–1988)

=== Lanie Bauer ===
Teri Keane (1988)

=== Leah Bauer ===
Marley Wright (2004)
Arielle Renwart (2006–2008)
Tyra Colar (2008–2009)

=== "Mama" Bauer (deceased) ===
Gloria Brandt (1948–1949)
Adelaide Klein (1949)

=== Meta Bauer ===
Gloria Blondel (1948)
Dorothy Lovett (1948–1949)
Jone Allison (1949–1952)
Ellen Demming (1952–1974)
Mary Stuart (1996–2002)

=== Michelle Bauer Santos ===
Anna Tendler (1985–1988)
Rachel Miner (1989–1995)
Rebecca Budig (1995–1998)
Bethany Joy Lenz (1998–2000)
Nancy St. Alban (2000–2005; 2009)

=== Mike Bauer ===
Glenn Walken & Christopher Walken (1954–1956)
Michael Allen (1957–1961)
Paul Prokopf (1962–1963)
Gary Pilar (1963–1965)
Robert Pickering (1968)
Don Stewart (1968–1984; 1997)

=== Rick Bauer ===
Albert Zungolo III (1970–1971)
Gary Hannoch (1972–1976)
Robbie Berridge (1976–1978)
Phil MacGregor (1982–1983)
Michael O'Leary (1983–1986; 1987–1991; 1995–2009)

=== Helene Benedict ===
Kay Campbell (1957–1964)

=== Henry Benedict ===
John Gibson (1958–1960)
John Boruff (1962–1966)
Lester Rawlins (1967)
Paul McGrath (1967)

=== Jack Blue ===
John Doman (1997)

=== Jesse Blue ===
Paulo Benediti (1997–2000)

=== Abigail Blume ===
Amy Ecklund (1995–2000)

=== Christina Boudreau ===
Karla Mosley (2008–2009)

=== Clayton Boudreau ===
Peter Francis James (2003–2009)

=== Felicia Boudreau ===
Kim Brockington (2002–2009)

Doctor.

=== Remy Boudreau ===
Corey Parker Robinson (2001–2002)
Gavin Houston (2002–2005)
Lawrence Saint-Victor (2006–2009)

=== Alex Bowden ===
Ernest Graves (1963–1966)

=== Cooper Bradshaw (deceased) ===
Michael Cugno (1996–1997)
Christopher and Nicholas Consolo (1997–1998)
Zachary Noll (1999–2000)
John Driscoll (2004–2009)

=== Jenna Bradshaw (deceased) ===
Fiona Hutchison (1992–1994; 1996–1998; 2006; 2009)

=== Joel Brooks ===
Charles Baxter (1954–1955)

=== Michael Burke ===
Peter Hermann (1997–1998)

Doctor.

== C ==
=== Julie Camaletti ===
Jocelyn Seagrave (1991–1994)

=== Wally Campbell ===
Jack Ryland (1969)

Lieutenant

=== Anthony James "J." Chamberlain ===
James Anthony Nielsen (1984–1985)
George Pilgrim (1996)
Ethan Erickson (1996–1998; 2009)

=== Henry Chamberlain (deceased) ===
William Roerick (1980–1995)

=== Nola Chamberlain ===
Lisa Brown (1980–1985; 1995–1998; 2009)

=== Quinton Chamberlain ===
Michael Tylo (1981–1985; 1996–1997)
Josh Taylor (1997)

=== Vanessa Chamberlain ===
Maeve Kinkead (1980–1987; 1989–2000; 2002; 2005–2009)

=== Pam Chandler ===
Maureen Silliman (1974–1976)

=== Max Chapman ===
Ben Hammer (1977–1978)

=== Peter Chapman ===
Curt Dawson (1977–1980)

=== Noah Chase ===
Mark Dobies (2000–2001)

=== Brandon Cohen ===
Kevin Collins (2008–2009)

=== Rebecca Collier ===
Ellen Holly (1989-1993)

Judge

=== Jack Conroy ===
Tony Craig (1986)

Senator

=== Linell Conway ===
Christina Pickles (1970–1972)

=== Buzz Cooper ===
Justin Deas (1993-2009)

=== Frank Cooper Jr. ===
Frank Dicopoulos (1987–2009)

=== Eleni Andros Cooper ===
Melina Kanakaredes (1991–1995)
Wendy Kaplan (1994–1995)
Jennifer Roszell (1995–2002; 2006–2009)

=== Harley Cooper ===
Beth Ehlers (1987–1993; 1997–2008)

=== Lucy Cooper ===
Sonia Satra (1993–1997; 1998; 2006–2007)

=== Marina Cooper ===
The character has been portrayed by six different actresses with Mandy Bruno playing the role since May 24, 2004. Marina married A.C. Mallet but is confronted by the return of her ex-boyfriend Shayne Lewis.

Casey Rosenhaus (1993–1994)
Alysia Zucker (1994–1996)
Sasha Martin (1996–2000)
Aubrey Dollar (2001–2004)
Kit Paquin (2004)
Mandy Bruno (2004–2009)

=== Nadine Cooper (deceased) ===
Jean Carol (1988–1995; 2003; 2006)

=== Rich Cosner ===
Kevin Collins (2006–2007)

=== Dahlia Crede ===
Sharon Leal (1996–1999)

=== Silas Crocker ===
Benjamin Hendrickson (1982)

=== Carrie Curruthers ===
Carrie Nye (2003–2006)

=== Patrick Cutter ===
Scott Hoxby (1993–1995)

== D ==
=== Louie Darnell ===
Eric Brooks (1983–1986)

Doctor

=== Selena Davis ===
Patti D'Arbanville (1998–2000)

=== Suzanne Deveraux ===
Juliet Pritner (1991–1992)

=== Sidney "Sid" Dickerson ===
Kelly Neal (1994–1995)

=== Keith Driscoll ===
Ed Moran (2007)

=== Annie Dutton ===
Cynthia Watros (1994–1998)
Signy Coleman (1998–1999; 2003)

=== Duke Lafferty ===
G Rockett Phillips (1980–1981)

== E ==
=== Betty Eiler ===
Madeleine Sherwood (1971–1972)

=== Charles Eiler ===
Graham Jarvis (1971–1972)

=== Einstein ===
Ian Alda (2007)

=== Mark Evans ===
Mark Pinter (1981–1983)

=== Nell Everest ===
Patrick O'Connell (1989–1990)

== F ==
=== Andy Ferris ===
Victor Slezak (1984–1985)

=== Fred Fletcher ===
John Gibson (1958)

Dr. Paul Fletcher's biological father.

=== Johnny Fletcher ===
Don Scardino (1965–1967)
Erik Howell (1967–1972)

=== Paul Fletcher ===
Michael Kane (1956)
Bernard Grant (1956–1979)

Fred Fletcher's biological son. Doctor

=== Leo Flynn ===
Robert LuPone (1990-2000)

=== Cyrus Foley ===
Murray Bartlett (2007–2009)

=== Carlo Fontini ===
James Coco (1986–1987)

=== Sandy Foster ===
Scott Bailey (2003–2006)

=== Whitney Foxton ===
Joseph Maher (1978–1979)

=== Jim Frazier ===
Billy Dee Williams (1966)
James Earl Jones (1966–1967)

Doctor

=== Martha Frazier ===
Ruby Dee (1967)

=== Jackson Freemont ===
Michael Wilding Jr. (1985–1987)

== G ==
=== Doug Gandil ===
Vic Noto (1981)

=== Verne Garrison ===
Barbara Meek (1992)

=== Sally Gleason ===
Patricia Barry (1985–1987)

=== Georgene Belmont Granger ===
Delphi Harrington (1976–1978)

=== Malcolm Granger ===
Ed Seamens (1976)

=== Laura Ashley Grant ===
Katherine N. Anderson (1953)
Alice Yourman (1953–1956)

=== Charles Grant ===
David Fonteno (1995–2000; 2002; 2003; 2004; 2006)

Doctor.

=== David Grant ===
Monti Sharp (1992–1995)
Russell Curry (1995–1996)
Terrell Tilford (1998–2001)

=== Dick Grant ===
James Lipton (1953)

Doctor.

=== Gillian "Gilly" Grant ===
Amelia Marshall (1989–1996)

=== Kathy Grant ===
Susan Douglas Rubeš (1952–1958)

=== Richard Grant ===
Ed Prentiss (1953)

=== Vivian Grant ===
Petronia Paley (1992–1997)

=== Brad Green ===
Michael Swan (2003)
Mark Pinter (2003–2004)

=== Joe Green ===
John Rothman (2007–2009)

Judge.

=== Eve Guthrie (deceased) ===
Hilary Edson (1992–1995)

Doctor

== H ==
=== Greta Halsey ===
Elizabeth Swados (1993; 1999)

=== Noelle Hamilton ===
Elaina Erika Davis (2002)

=== Richard Hanley ===
Mandel Kramer (1953)

District Attorney.

=== Sid Harper ===
Philip Sterling (1952–1954)

=== Chuck Haskell ===
Peter Gallagher (1979)

=== Jack Haskell ===
Paul Larson (1966)

=== George Hayes ===
Philip Sterling (1963–1968)

=== Ramona Herndon ===
Colleen Dion (2003)

=== Adrian "Sugar" Hill ===
Taye Diggs (1997)

=== Tangie Hill ===
Marcy Walker (1993–1995)

=== Wanda Hite ===
Carey Cromelin (2009)

=== Alice Holden ===
Sandy Dennis (1956)
Diane Gentner (1956–1958)
Lin Pearson (1958–1959)

=== Mark Holden ===
Whitfield Connor (1955–1961)

=== Charlie Hubbs ===
Jabari Gray (2006)

Police detective.

=== Luke Huff ===
John Lavelle (2004)

=== Sebastian Hulce ===
Doug Hutchison (2004–2005)

== J ==
=== Stephen Jackson ===
Stefan Schnabel (1966–1981)

Doctor.

=== Drew Jacobs ===
Tammy Blanchard (1997–2000)

=== Karl Jannings ===
Richard Morse (1959)

=== Will Jefferies ===
Joseph Breen (1987–1989)

=== Brenda Jensen ===
Linda Cook (2003)

=== Hart Jessup (deceased) ===
Jeff Phillips (1991–1992)
Leonard Stabb (1993)
Sean McDermott (1993)
Marshall Hilliard (1995–1996)
Frank Grillo (1996–1999)

=== R.J. Jessup ===
Alex Beck (1998–2003)
Christian Kulp (2003–2004)
Miles Williams (2004–2008)

=== Janet Johnson ===
Ruth Warrick (1953–1954)
Lois Wheeler (1954–1956; 1957–1958)

Registered Nurse.

=== Dana Jones ===
Katell Pleven (1989–1990)

=== Harry Jones ===
Mark Margolis (1994)

== K ==
=== Paul Keeler ===
Ed Begley (1952)
Mel Ruick (1953)

Reverend and Doctor.

=== Jim Kelly ===
Paul Potter (1954)

Doctor.

=== Helen Kennedy ===
Nancy Pinkerton (1985)

=== Karen Kennedy ===
Sharon Washington (1992)

=== Jack Kiley ===
Tom Tammi (1992)

=== Sheila Kiley ===
Kristine Sutherland (1992)

=== Dante "Pops Cooper" Kouperakis ===
Vince O'Brien (1995–2009)

=== Stavros Kouperakis ===
Eugene Troobnick (1991–1995)

== L ==
=== Paul La Crosse ===
Jacques Roux (1977–1981)

Doctor

=== Duke Lafferty ===
G. Rockett Phillips (1980–1981)

=== Robin Lang ===
Zina Bethune (1958)

=== Christopher Langham ===
Russ Anderson (2003–2004)

=== Laverne Larkin ===
Rebecca Damon (2008–2009)

=== Jeremy Larson ===
Greg McFadden (2006–2009)

=== Brent Lawrence ===
Frank Beaty (1995–1996)

=== Rob Layne ===
Timothy Adams (2000)

=== Daisy Lemay ===
Brittany Slattery (1989, 1994)
Brittany Snow (1998–2001)
Bonnie Dennison (2007–2009)

=== Jim Lemay ===
Anthony Addabbo (1999–2000)

=== Bill Lewis III ===
Renald White (1984–1986)
Bryan Buffington (1989–1998)
Ryan Brown (1998–2001)
Daniel Cosgrove (2002–2005; 2007–2009)

=== Billy Lewis II ===
Jordan Clarke (1983–1986; 1989–1993; 1996–1998; 1999–2009)
Geoffrey Scott (1993–1994)

=== Dylan Lewis ===
Morgan Englund (1989–1995; 1997; 1999; 2002; 2004, 2006; 2009)
Brian Gaskill (2007–2008)

Son of Reva Shayne and Billy Lewis

=== H.B. Lewis (deceased) ===
Larry Gates (1983–1996)

=== Joshua "Josh" Lewis ===
Robert Newman (1981–1984; 1986–1991; 1993–2009)

=== Marah Lewis ===
Nicole Otto (1987–1988)
Ashley Peldon (1989–1991)
Kimberly J. Brown (1993–1998; 2006)
Lauren C. Mayhew (1998–1999)
Laura Bell Bundy (1999–2001)
Lindsey McKeon (2001–2004)

=== Mindy Lewis ===
Krista Tesreau (1983–1989; 2004; 2006, 2009)
Kimberley Simms (1989–1992; 1997)
Ann Hamilton (1993)
Barbara Crampton (1993–1995)

=== Patricia "Trish" Lewis ===
Rebecca Hollen (1980–1984)

=== Shayne Lewis ===
Travis Cartier (1990–1991)
Bret Cooper (1993–1997)
Garrett Stevens (1997–1999)
Tony Michael Donnelly (1999)
Billy Kay (2000–2003)
Marty West (2003–2004)
Jeff Branson (2008–2009)

=== Ernie Logan ===
Brett Rigby (2007–2009)

=== Brandon "Lujack" Luvonaczek (deceased) ===
Vincent Irizarry (1983–1986; 1989)

=== Eric Luvonaczek ===
Ted Sorel (1991–1992)

== M ==
=== A.C. Mallet ===
Mark Derwin (1990–1993)
Robert Bogue (2005–2009)

=== Blake Marler ===
Gina Foy (1975–1978)
Cheryl Lynn Brown (1979–1980)
Elizabeth Dennehy (1988–1989)
Sherry Stringfield (1989–1992)
Elizabeth Keifer (1992–2009)

Wife of Ross Marler. Daughter of Roger Thorpe and Holly Norris Reade. Also known as Christina/Chrissy.

=== Clarissa Marler ===
Samantha Sterck (2002-2003)
Arielle Fleischer (2006–2008)
Naelee Rae (2008–2009)

=== Dinah Marler ===
Jennifer Gatti (1986–1987)
Paige Turco (1987–1989)
Wendy Moniz (1995–1999)
Gina Tognoni (2004–2009)

Daughter of Ross Marler and Vanessa Chamberlain.

=== Elaine "Lanie" Marler ===
Katheen Kellaigh (1979–1981)

=== Jason Marler ===
Samantha Stein (1996)
Cody Arens (1998)
James & Michael Mackonockie (1998–2002)
Ryan Marsini (2002)
James Kukinski (2002)
Mick Hazen (2006)

=== Justin Marler ===
Thomas O'Rourke (1976–1983)
Christopher Pennock (1990–1991)

=== Kevin Marler ===
Brandon Unger (1996)
Isabelle Farrell (1996–1998)
Brett & Shane Harder (1998–2002)
Jeffrey Scaperrotta (2002–2005)
Eric Nelsen (2006)

=== Ross Marler (deceased) ===
Jerry Ver Dorn (1979–2005)

Husband of Blake.

=== Samantha Marler ===
Suzy Cote (1989–1992)

=== Karen Martin ===
Tudi Wiggins (1971–1972)

=== Grove Mason ===
Vince O'Brien (1967–1970, 1989–1990)

=== Sean McCullough ===
William Bumiller (1998–1999)

=== Eve McFarren ===
Janet Grey (1976–1982)

=== Dr. Sara McIntyre ===
Patricia Roe (1967–1968)
Jill Andre (1968)
Millette Alexander (1969–1983)

=== Rose McLaren ===
Alexandra Neil (1987–1989)

=== Deborah Mehren ===
Olivia Cole (1969–1971)

=== Jeffrey Morgan ===
Ramy Zaza (1997–1998)

=== Joe Morrison ===
Daniel von Bargen (1993)

=== Andrew Murray ===
Dana Elcar (1962)

District Attorney

== N ==
=== Natasha ===
BethAnn Bonner (2009)

=== Rebecca Nash ===
Christopher Norris (1992)

=== Kelly Nelson ===
John Wesley Shipp (1980–1984)

=== Ira Newton ===
Sorrell Booke (1972)

District Attorney

=== Max Nickerson ===
Jesse Lee Soffer (1999)
Paul Wesley (1999–2000)

=== Nolan ===
Stephen Zinnato (2001–2004)

=== Bonnie Noonan ===
Julie Potter (1991–1995)

=== Andrew "Andy" Norris ===
Barney McFadden (1975)
Ted Le Plat (1980–1981)

=== Barbara Norris ===
Augusta Dabney (1970–1971)
Barbara Berjer (1971–1981; 1995–1996)

=== Holly Norris Reade ===
Lynn Deerfield (1970–1976)
Maureen Garrett (1976–1980; 1988–2006; 2009)

=== Kenneth Norris ===
Roger Newman (1970–1972; 1973–1975; 1998–1999)

=== Stanley "Stan" Norris ===
Michael Higgins (1970)

== O ==
=== Carroll O'Malley ===
Will Lyman (1995)

=== Colin O'Neill ===
Chase & Trevor Tonon (2009)

=== Jeffrey O'Neill ===
Bradley Cole (2003–2009)
T.J. Linnard (2006)

=== Sir Clayton Olds ===
Miles Easton (1973–1974)

British Psychiatrist

== P ==
=== Trudy Palmer ===
Helen Wagner (1952)

=== Floyd Parker ===
Tim Nielsen (1980–1985)

=== Katie Parker ===
Denise Pence (1977–1985)

=== Ava Peralta ===
Michelle Ray Smith (2005–2008; 2009)

=== Dan Peters ===
Paul Ballantyne (1954)

=== Susan Piper ===
Carrie Nye (1984)

=== Susan Prescott ===
Casey Hutchison (1960–1985)

== Q ==
=== Catalina Quesada ===
Jessica Jimenez (2000–2002)

=== Quinn ===
Neal Bledsoe (2005)

== R ==
=== Beth Raines ===
Judi Evans (1983–1986)
Beth Chamberlin (1989–1991; 1997–2009)

=== Bradley Raines ===
James Rebhorn (1983–1985; 1989)

=== Lillian Raines ===
Tina Sloan (1983–2009)

Registered Nurse.

=== Claire Ramsey ===
Susan Pratt (1983–1986; 2000–2002)

=== Jonathan Randall ===
Sean Rademaker (1999–2000)
Tom Pelphrey (2004–2009)

=== Sarah Randall ===
Alexa Kaplan (2009)

=== Ben Reade (deceased) ===
Geoffrey Burke (1989–1996)
Matthew Bomer (2001–2003)

=== Fletcher Reade ===
Jay Hammer (1984–1998; 1999; 2009)

=== Bea Reardon ===
Lee Lawson (1980–1985; 1986; 1987–1988; 1990)

=== Bridget Reardon ===
Melissa Hayden (1991–1997; 2009)

=== Chelsea Reardon ===
Kassie DePaiva (1986–1991)

=== Jim Reardon ===
Michael Woods (1983–1985)

=== Matt Reardon ===
Kurt McKinney (1994–2000; 2005; 2006–2009)

=== Maureen Reardon ===
Noel & Natalie Chant (2000)
Jaycie Megan Cohen (2000)
Olivia Dicopoulos (2009)

=== Nola Reardon ===
Lisa Brown (1980–1985; 1995–1998; 2009)

=== Tony Reardon ===
Gregory Beecroft (1981–1985)

=== Peggy Ashley Regan ===
Patricia Wheel (1953–1955)

=== Dalton Reid ===
Matt Walton (2008)

=== Carl Richards ===
Wayne Tippit (1974)

Doctor

=== Jennifer Richards ===
Geraldine Court (1982)

=== Morgan Richards (Nelson) ===
Kristen Vigard (1980–1981)
Jennifer Cooke (1981–1983)

=== Natalia Rivera ===
Jessica Leccia (2007–2009)

=== Joe Roberts ===
Herbert Nelson (1952–1955)

=== Rae Rooney ===
Allison Daugherty (1989–1990)

=== Tim Ryan ===
Jordan Clarke (1974–1976)

Doctor

== S ==
=== Vinnie Salerno ===
John Fiore (2002–2008)

=== Kyle Sampson ===
Larkin Malloy (1985–1987)

=== Wyatt Sanders ===
Keith Christopher (1995–1996)

=== Carmen Santos ===
Saundra Santiago (1999–2000; 2001–2003)

=== Danny Santos ===
Paul Anthony Stewart (1998–2005; 2009)

=== Hope Santos ===
Cally and Brooke Tarleton (2005)
Lucy Palubo (2009)

=== Maria Santos ===
Míriam Colón (2001)

=== Mick Santos ===
Juan Carlos Hernández (1998)

=== Michelle Bauer Santos ===
Rebecca Budig (1995-1998)
Bethany Joy Lenz (1998–2000)
Nancy St. Alban (2000–2005, 2009)

=== Pilar Santos ===
Paula Garces (1999–2001)

=== Ray Santos ===
Jaime Passer (1999)
George Alvarez (1999–2009)

=== Robbie Santos ===
Joshua and Julia Ladd (2001–2002)
Jack O'Rourke (2002–2003)
Patrick Gilbert (2003–2005; 2009)

=== Tony Santos (deceased) ===
Jordi Vilasuso (2000–2003)
Stephen Martines (2003–2005)

=== Ben Scott ===
Bernard Kates (1965–1968)

=== Emmett Scott ===
Kenneth Harvey (1976)
Frank Latimore (1976–1979)

Doctor.

=== Margaret Sedwick ===
Margaret Gwenver (1982–2007)

Doctor

=== Hawk Shayne ===
Gil Rogers (1985–1990; 1995–1999; 2002; 2004; 2006)

=== Reva Shayne ===
Kim Zimmer (1983–1990; 1995–2009)

=== Roxie Shayne ===
Kristi Ferrell (1984–1988)

=== Sarah Shayne ===
Audrey Peters (1987–1991; 1993; 2006)

=== Sheila Slye ===
Kate Miller (2008)

=== Zachary Smith ===
Brody Hutzler (1996–1997)

=== Soto ===
Nick Santino (2002)

Reverend.

=== Alan Spaulding (deceased) ===
Chris Bernau (1977–1984; 1986–1988)
Wayne Tippit (1982, temporary replacement)
Daniel Pilon (1988–1989; 1990)
Ron Raines (1994–2009)

=== Alan-Michael Spaulding ===
Jessica Zutterman (1981–1983)
Carl T. Evans (1987–1990)
Rick Hearst (1990–1996)
Michael Dietz (1996–1997)
Michael Dempsey (2005–2007)

=== Alexandra Spaulding ===
Lydia Bruce (1984)
Beverlee McKinsey (1984–1992)
Marj Dusay (1993–1997; 1998–1999; 2002–2009)
Joan Collins (2002)

=== Amanda Spaulding ===
Kathleen Cullen (1978–1983; 1987)
Toby Poser (1995–1998)

=== Brandon Spaulding (deceased) ===
Ralph Bell (1983)

=== Emma Spaulding ===
Kathryn Hall (2006–2007)
Jacqueline Tsirkin (2007–2009)

=== James Spaulding ===
Desmond and Aidan Young (2000–2001)
Caleb Collins (2001–2008)
Zack Conroy (2009)

=== Lizzie Spaulding ===
Julie Levine (1990–1991)
Hayden Panettiere (1996–2000)
MacKenzie Mauzy (2000–2002)
Allison Hirschlag (2002–2003)
Crystal Hunt (2003–2006)
Marcy Rylan (2006–2009)

=== Nick McHenry Spaulding ===
Vincent Irizarry (1991–1996)

=== Phillip Spaulding ===
Jarrod Ross (1977–1981)
Grant Aleksander (1982–1984; 1986–1991; 1996–2004; 2005; 2009)
John Bolger (1985–1986)

=== Victoria "Vicky" Spaulding ===
Victoria Platt (1998–2000)

=== Zach Spaulding ===
Connor and Keegan Sinclair (1999–2002; recurring)
Nicholas Art (2002–2008; recurring)

=== Hampton Speakes ===
Vince Williams (1989–1996)

=== Kathryn "Kat" Speakes ===
Nia Long (1991–1994)

=== Olivia Spencer ===
Crystal Chappell (1999–2009)

=== Daniel St. John ===
David Bishins (1990–1992)

=== Logan Stafford ===
Richard Hamilton (1981)

=== Eve Stapleton-McFerron ===
Janet Grey (1976–1983)

=== Rita Stapleton-Bauer ===
Lenore Kasdorf (1975–1981)

=== Viola Stapleton ===
Sudie Bond (1976)
Kate Wilkinson (1976–1981)

=== Cameron Stewart ===
Ian Ziering (1986–1988)

=== Maeve Stoddard ===
Leslie Denniston (1985–1988)

=== Gavin "The Mole" Strong ===
Geoffrey Arend (2003)

=== Ralphie Sullivan ===
Lee Reherman (2000)

=== Jack Summers ===
John Behlmann (2007)

=== Gary Swanson ===
William Bell Sullivan (1989–1990)

== T ==
=== Johnny "Dub" Taylor ===
Marko Maglich (1984–1985)

=== Bart Thompson ===
Barry Thomson (1954)

Doctor

=== Adam Thorpe ===
Robert Gerringer (1972–1973)
Robert Milli (1973–1981; 1989; 1994)

=== Roger Thorpe (deceased) ===
Michael Zaslow (1971–1980; 1989–1997)
Dennis Parlato (1997–1998)

=== Carrie Todd ===
Jane Elliot (1981–1982)

=== Joe Turino ===
Joseph Campanella (1959–1960)

=== Clay Tynan ===
Giancarlo Esposito (1982–1983)

=== Helen Tynan ===
Micki Grant (1982–1984)

== V ==
=== Christine Valere ===
Ariana Chase (1986–1987)

=== Paul Valere ===
Robin Ward (1987)

=== Missy Van Houten ===
Cathy Lynn Yonek (1993)

=== Eric Van Gelder ===
Larry Gates (1977–1978)

=== David Vested ===
Peter D. Greene (1970–1971)
Dan Hamilton (1971–1972)

=== Kit Vested ===
Nancy Addison (1969–1974)

=== Jack Vice ===
Sean Patrick Reilly (2004)

=== Francesca Vizzini ===
Nadia Capone (1991)

=== Dorie Von Halkein ===
Kim Fertman (1985–1986)

=== India Von Halkein ===
Mary Kay Adams (1984–1987; 1990; 1998–1999; 2002; 2005)

=== Peter Vreeland ===
Roscoe Born (2001)

== W ==
=== Charlotte Waring (A.K.A. Tracy Delmar Fletcher) ===
Victoria Wyndham (1967–1971)
Felice Camargo (1969)
Dorrie Kavanaugh (1970)
Melinda O. Fee (1971–1973)

=== Ben Warren (deceased) ===
Hunt Block (1997–1999)

=== Joe Werner ===
Ben Hayes (1966–1967)
Ed Zimmermann (1967–1972)
Anthony Call (1972–1976)

Doctor

=== Tim "T.J." Werner ===
T.J. Hargrave (1974–1976)
Kevin Bacon (1980–1981)
Christopher Marcantel (1981–1982)

=== Lucille Wexler ===
Rita Lloyd (1980–1981)

=== Peter Wexler ===
Michael Durrell (1968–1971)

=== Charlotte Wheaton ===
Barbara Garrick (1985)

=== Griffin Williams ===
Geoffrey C. Ewing (1995–1998)

=== Marcus Williams ===
Kevin Mambo (1995–1998)

=== Cassie Layne Winslow ===
Laura Wright (1997–2005)
Nicole Forrester (2005–2008)

=== Edmund Winslow ===
David Andrew Macdonald (1999–2005; 2008–2009)

=== Richard Winslow ===
Bradley Cole (1999–2002)

=== Tammy Winslow (deceased) ===
Katie Sagona (1997–2002)
Stephanie Gatschet (2002–2007)

=== Will Winslow ===
Scott and Zachary Benes (2001–2005)
Seamus Davey-Fitzpatrick (2007–2008)

=== Kirk Winters ===
James Horan (1980–1981)

Detective.

=== Cass Winthrop ===
Stephen Schnetzer (2002)

=== Miss Emma Witherspoon ===
Maureen O'Sullivan (1984)

=== Ashlee Wolfe ===
Caitlin Van Zandt (2006–2009)

=== Doris Wolfe ===
Orlagh Cassidy (1999–2009)

=== Carl Wyatt ===
Gerald S. O'Laughlin (1965)

Lieutenant

== Y ==
=== Anita Ybarra ===
Carla Pinza (1988–1989)

=== John Young ===
Khin-Kyaw Maung (1984)

=== Louisa Young ===
Holly Marie Combs (1990)

=== Yves ===
Reid Mihalko (2001)

== Z ==
=== Zamana ===
Adolph Ceasar (1984)

=== Zamir ===
Cory Nichols (2009)

=== Ziggy ===
Cal Robertson (2007)

=== Zoe ===
Christy Meyers (2005)
