= Alan Spaulding =

- Guiding Light character
- Portrayed by: Christopher Bernau (1977–84, 1986–88); David Bailey (1979); Daniel Pilon (1988–90); Ron Raines (1994–2009); Jeff Branson (2004)
- Duration: 1977–84, 1986–90, 1994–2009
- First appearance: November 7, 1977
- Last appearance: September 16, 2009
- Created by: Bridget and Jerome Dobson
- Introduced by: Allen M. Potter
In-universe information
- Occupation: CEO of Spaulding Enterprises; Executive at Spaulding Enterprises; Part owner of the Lewis Construction building Owner of The Springfield Journal; Board member at Cedars Hospital; President of Spaulding Enterprises; Temporarily owned Lews Oil; Former President of Advantage Systems; Owner of The Mirror newspaper
- Parents: Brandon Spaulding; Penelope Winthrop
- Sisters: Alexandra Spaulding
- Half-sisters: Victoria Spaulding; Amanda Spaulding
- Wife: Elizabeth Granville (until 1979); Jackie Scott (1979–80); Hope Bauer (1980–81); Reva Shayne (2000); Olivia Spencer (2001–02); Beth Raines (2005–07); Doris Wolfe (2007)
- Sons: Gus Aitoro; Phillip Spaulding (adoptive); Alan-Michael Spaulding
- Daughters: Peyton Spaulding
- Grandsons: Rafe Rivera; James Spaulding (GL); James Spaulding (adoptive); Zach Spaulding (adoptive)
- Granddaughters: Lizzie Spaulding; Emma Spaulding (adoptive)
- Nephews: Lujack Spaulding; Nick McHenry
- Nieces: Vicky Spaulding

Alan Spaulding is a fictional character on the CBS soap opera Guiding Light. He was played by Christopher Bernau from the time of the character's introduction in 1977 until 1984, and from 1986 to June 1988, when Bernau left the role due to health problems. David Bailey briefly portrayed the role in 1979. Daniel Pilon stepped into the role from 1988 until the character was sent to prison in 1990. From 1994 to the series 2009 conclusion, the character was played by Ron Raines. Jeff Branson briefly played a young Alan in a flashback scene during Carrie Carruther's murder investigation.

== Storylines ==
Alan Spaulding resides in Chicago with his wealthy family prior to his move to Springfield. At the time, he is married to Elizabeth, and they are the adoptive parents of Phillip Spaulding (though Elizabeth believes Phillip to be her biological son). Shortly after the Spauldings' arrival in Springfield, Alan has an affair with Phillip's governess, Diane Ballard; When Elizabeth senses impropriety between Alan and Diane, she terminates Diane as Phillip's governess, but Alan immediately hires her as his executive assistant at Spaulding Enterprises.

Elizabeth eventually tires of Alan's philandering and divorces him. Alan begins to date the much younger Hope Bauer whom he eventually marries. They have a son, Alan-Michael Spaulding, but divorce after Alan's affair with Rita Bauer, who is married to Hope's uncle, Ed.

Jennifer Richards comes to town, and it is revealed that Amanda Wexler was Alan and Jennifer's illegitimate daughter, a secret Amanda's adoptive mother, Lucille, is desperate to keep. It comes out when Jennifer goes on trial for Lucille's murder.

Alan's affair with Rita may have resulted in a child as it is suggested that Rita is pregnant when she leaves town. Alan is blackmailed by several people who threaten to reveal that Phillip was adopted; his biological parents are Justin Marler and Jackie Marler, maiden name Scott, who later marries Alan. (Eventually the truth is revealed, that Alan and Elizabeth's son was stillborn, and that Alan, who did not believe that Elizabeth could handle the trauma, arranges to replace the deceased baby with another while Elizabeth was under anesthesia during the C-section delivery. The revelations cause Elizabeth to leave Springfield for good, and alienate Phillip from Alan for a time.)

Under duress, he helps Roger Thorpe escape from Springfield although crooked dealings between the two make them lifelong enemies. Alan is a major suspects in Diane Ballard's murder and goes on the run, even though he was innocent. Alan is instrumental in bringing Reva Shayne to town to help him break up Billy Lewis and Vanessa Chamberlain, the latter of whom Alan wants to marry.

Alan was very close to his sister Alexandra growing up, and planned a masked ball in her honor when she comes to town. She initially seeks revenge for his part in their father, Brandon, taking away her illegitimate son, and blackmails him into giving her control of Spaulding when she learns of his dealings with Beth Raines' adoptive father, Bradley. Alan disappears in the jungle during the "Dreaming Death" scare that takes the lives of several Springfield residents.

Two years later, Alan turns up alive, having plotted with India Von Halkein and her father to take over Spaulding. Alexandra and Alan battle but eventually come to an understanding. Alan and Vanessa once again become involved and are briefly engaged, but his fascination with Reva leads to Vanessa leaving town and ending their relationship for good.

Alan learns that new Spaulding employee Blake Lindsey is really Christina Thorpe, Roger's daughter. In the middle of Blake and Philip's wedding, the truth about Roger is revealed, and Alan accidentally shoots Philip while aiming at Roger. He is sent to prison, periodically appearing as he reveals to Philip the secret that Beth Raines, his long-time love, had not drowned, but is still alive, and living with amnesia.

Alan is released early due to good behavior. He shows up in Springfield but remains in hiding while returning to prison on occasion to fool his family into thinking he is still incarcerated. Alan attempts to recover his power at Spaulding.

Aiding Alan in his schemes is Roger Thorpe, whom he promises a future at Spaulding if he can cajole Alexandra into returning Alan's stocks. Alan pretends to be dying in order to gain sympathy. Alexandra relents into returning his shares but is livid when she learns the truth. She eventually forgives him, and they agree to co-chair the company while giving the now adult Alan Michael the C.E.O. position.

When Amanda returns to town, it is revealed that she is not Alan's daughter, but his sister through an affair her mother Jennifer had with Brandon. Philip returns to town and reveals that one of the family members with the initial "A" had framed him for murder in order to get him out of the way. Although Amanda is the obvious suspect, it turns out to be Alan. With Alan Michael married to Lucy Cooper and out of town, Alexandra off to Europe with her son, and Amanda leaving for California with her new husband, Roger, Spaulding Enterprises is left to Philip and Alan for several years, only changing when Alexandra returns.

Alexandra's return brings out the presence of another Spaulding son. Augustico "Gus" Aitoro was the product of an affair between Alan and a Spaulding maid, and knowing that Alan wasn't ready for the responsibility of a family, the young Alexandra arranged for Gus to be adopted. Gus, brought up in a working-class family, doesn't accept the wealthy Spaulding lifestyle, but time brings them closer.

Alan marries Beth Raines, but after a miscarriage, they divorce. Alan soon marries Doris Wolfe due to blackmail regarding Tammy Winslow's death and Alan's involvement. Alan is shot during the reception by his new stepdaughter, Ashlee Wolfe, and remains in critical condition for several weeks. He awakens as a new man full of love and forgiveness, but he soon reverts to his old self. Alan's ex-wife Beth Raines is expecting his child; due to Cassie, he is unaware of this and believes, along with Beth and Rick Bauer, that the child is Rick's, whom Beth married.

Alan and Doris annul their marriage, contrasting the storyline of Alan-Olivia-Phillip when she was married to Alan and pregnant. They believe it is Alan's child but it is Phillip's. Alan and Olivia divorce, and she remarries Phillip has Emma.

Alan plans to have Jonathan Randall killed and make it look like a hit and run. However, Tammy Lane Winslow pushes Jonathan out of the way and sacrifices herself to save her true love. Alan is not convicted of this crime, but everyone knows he did it. This leads to the down-spiraling of Cassie Winslow's sanity at the loss of her daughter. She continues to blame Alan for Tammy's death and is seeking vengeance.

He saves Reva's life, and to keep each other from telling anyone, Reva moves into the Spaulding mansion.

Alan volunteers to have a transplant to save his son Phillip's life. While recovering, Alan attends the Lewis/Cooper wedding.

Alan dies on a bench in front of a lake. He is cremated and his remains put in the same lake where he died.

== The Spaulding Empire ==
- Alexandra Spaulding – Alan Spaulding's older sister, currently chair of Spaulding Enterprises. Inherited bulk of father Brandon Spaulding's fortune after making peace with him before his death and with Alan being presumed dead at the time in 1984. Her son Nick will presumably inherit her estate upon her death.
- Phillip Granville Spaulding – Alan's adoptive son, inherited the bulk of Alan's estate. Currently CEO of Spaulding Enterprises
- Alan-Michael Spaulding – Alan's youngest son . Alan-Michael was said to inherit one penny from his estate.
- Elizabeth "Lizzie" Lillian Spaulding – Alan's granddaughter via Phillip Spaulding and Beth Raines. Lizzie is the apple of Alan's eye and holds a trust fund and a position as an heiress to the Spaulding empire.
- James Alexander Spaulding – Alan's grandson via Phillip Spaulding and Beth Raines. James holds a trust fund and a position as an heir to the Spaulding empire equal to that of his sister Elizabeth.
- Zach Spaulding|Alan Cooper "Zach" Spaulding – Alan's grandson via Phillip Spaulding and Harley Cooper. Harley has refused to allow Zach an inheritance from the Spaulding family until he is of legal age.
- Emma Spaulding – Alan's granddaughter via Phillip Spaulding and Olivia Spencer will receive nothing from the estate due to Alan's disapproval of Olivia's lesbian relationship with Natalia.
- Sarah Elizabeth Randall – Alan's great-granddaughter via Lizzie Spaulding and Jonathan Randall. She is the only great-grandchild heir to the Spaulding fortune.
- Amanda Spaulding – Alan Spaulding's oldest daughter, Later revealed as Alan Sister. Was raised by Lucille Wexler, and did not learn of her connection to the Spaulding family until well into her 20s. Controlled Spaulding Enterprises with Phillip from March 1997 until departure in March 1998. Amanda currently lives abroad.
- Beth Raines Spaulding – Alan Spaulding's 5th wife (2005–2007) and the ex-wife of his son Phillip Spaulding, and the mother of two of Alan's grandchildren. Beth seems to be the current love of Alan's life and holds a trust fund in his will. Recently in 2008, Beth gave birth to Alan's daughter and sometime between 2009 and 2010 remarries Phillip.
- Augustico "Gus" Aitoro – Alan's illegitimate son. Deceased
- 'Raphael "Rafe" Joseph Rivera – Gus Aitoro illegitimate son and Alan's illegitimate grandson. He left enough money to take care of him, but was cut out of much of the will due his disapproval of the lesbian relationship Natalia was in with Olivia.
- Peyton Alexandra Spaulding His newborn daughter Peyton was provided for through a trust to be administered by her mother Beth.
- Victoria Brandon Spaulding – Alexandra & Alan's niece via their late African American sister Victoria Spaulding. Vicky, much like her mother, was not close with Alan.

== The Spaulding family tree ==
- Alexander Spaulding (deceased)
  - Lydia (maiden name unknown, deceased)
    - Samuel Spaulding (deceased)
      - Victoria (maiden name unknown, deceased)
        - Brandon Spaulding (deceased)
          - m. Penelope Winthrop [dissolved] (deceased)
            - Alexandra Spaulding
            - a. Eric Luvonaczek (deceased)
        - c. Brandon "Lujack" Lovonaczek (deceased)
        - c. Nicholas "Nick" McHenry-Spaulding
          - m. Melinda Sue "Mindy" Lewis [divorced] [1994–1995]
          - m. Susan Bates [married] [1996+]
      - m. Baron Leo von Halkein [divorced] [1980–1984]
      - m. Roger Thorpe [divorced] [1990–1991] (deceased)
      - m. Cyrus Foley [divorced] [2007]
    - c. Alan Spaulding (deceased 2009)
      - m. Elizabeth Granville [divorced] [1966–1978]
        - c. Unnamed child (deceased)
        - c. Phillip Spaulding {adoptive}
          - m. Melinda Sue "Mindy" Lewis [divorced] [1984]
            - c. Unnamed child (deceased)
          - m. India von Halkein [divorced] [1985–1986]
          - a. Meredith Reade
            - c. Unnamed child (deceased)
          - m. Christine Blake "Blake" Thorpe [divorced] [1989–1990]
          - m. Elizabeth "Beth" Raines [divorced] [1991–1996]
            - c. Elizabeth "Lizzie" Spaulding
              - m. Jonathan Randall [annulled] [2006–2007]
                - c. Sarah Randall
              - m. Harlan Billy "Bill" Lewis III [2009–]
                - c. Unnamed son (due late 2010)
          - m. Harley Cooper [divorced] [1998–2001]
            - c. Alan Cooper "Zach" Spaulding
          - a. Elizabeth "Beth" Raines
            - c. James Spaulding
          - a. Olivia Spencer
            - c. Emma Spaulding
          - m. Olivia Spencer [divorced] [2004]
          - m. Elizabeth "Beth" Raines [married] [2009–]
      - a. Lucia Renaldi
        - c. Augustus "Gus" Aitoro {placed for adoption} (deceased)
          - a. Natalia Rivera
            - c. Raphael "Rafe" Rivera
              - a. Susan "Daisy" Lemay
                - c. Unnamed child {aborted} (deceased)
          - m. Harley Cooper [divorced] [2005–2007]
          - m. Natalia Rivera [dissolved] [2007]
      - m. Jacqueline "Jackie" Scott [divorced] [1979–1980] (deceased)
        - c. Unnamed child (deceased)
      - m. Hope Bauer [divorced] [1980–1983]
        - c. Alan-Michael Spaulding
          - m. Harley Cooper [divorced] [1989–1990]
          - m. Christine Blake "Blake" Thorpe [divorced] [1990]
          - m. Eleni Andros [divorced] [1991–1993]
          - m. Lucile "Lucy" Cooper [divorced] [1996–2005]
      - m. Reva Shayne [divorced] [1988]
      - m. Olivia Spencer [divorced] [2002–2003]
      - m. Elizabeth "Beth" Raines [divorced] [2005–2007]
        - c. Unnamed child (deceased)
        - c. Peyton Spaulding
      - m. Doris Wolfe [annulled] [2007]
  - a. Sharina Tamerlaine (deceased)
    - c. Victoria Spaulding (deceased)
      - a. Stanley Norris (deceased)
        - c. Victoria "Vicky" Spaulding
  - a. Jane Marie Staffor aka Jennifer Richards
    - c. Amanda Wexler Spaulding {placed for adoption raised by Lucille Wexler}
      - m. Gordon Middeton [divorced] [1970–1979]
      - m. Ben McFarren [divorced] [1980–1981]
        - c. Unnamed child (deceased)
      - m. Roger Thorpe [dissolved] [1998–2004] (deceased)
- Herbert Spaulding 1st (deceased)
  - (unknown woman, deceased)
    - Herbert Spaulding 2nd (Brandon's cousin, deceased)
