= Blake Marler =

- Guiding Light character
- Portrayed by: Gina Foy (1975—1978); Cheryl Lynn Brown (1979–1980); Elizabeth Dennehy (1988–1989); Sherry Stringfield (1989–1992); Elizabeth Keifer (1992–2009); Lindsay Lohan (1993)
- Duration: 1975–1980; 1988–2009
- First appearance: July 9, 1975
- Last appearance: September 18, 2009
- Created by: Bridget and Jerome Dobson
- Introduced by: Allen M. Potter (1975); Joe Willmore (1988)
In-universe information
- Other names: Christina Bauer; Christina Thorpe; Blake Lindsey; C. Blake Thorpe; Darlena LaCrosse; Fern LaPlante; C. Blake Marler
- Occupation: Author; Novelist; Real estate broker; Ordained minister
- Parents: Roger Thorpe; Holly Reade
- Siblings: Sebastian Hulce; Hart Jessup; Meg Reade
- Spouse: Unnamed Shiek (1989); Phillip Spaulding (1989–1990); Alan-Michael Spaulding (1990); Ross Marler (1994–1998, 2003–2005)
- Children: Jason Marler; Kevin Marler; Clarissa Marler
- Grandparents: Adam Thorpe; Marjorie Thorpe; Stanley Norris; Barbara Norris
- Aunts and uncles: Andrew Norris; Ken Norris
- Nieces and nephews: Peter Reardon; R.J. Winslow
- First cousins: Emily Norris

Christina Blake Marler is a fictional character from the CBS daytime soap opera Guiding Light with the role last portrayed by Elizabeth Keifer from August 19, 1992 to September 18, 2009.

== Character information ==
=== Casting ===
Born on screen in July 1975 as Christina Bauer, the role was originated by Gina Foy, who remained with the series until May 1978. In January 1979, the role was recast with Cheryl Lynn Brown, who left the series on September 26, 1980. In May 1988, the character, who now referred to herself as "Blake", was reintroduced as an adult played by Elizabeth Dennehy. Dennehy remained with the series until June 1989. Sherry Stringfield took over the role in July 1989 and remained with the series until August 1992, at which point she was replaced with Elizabeth Keifer. In August 2003, Keifer was downgraded to recurring status, where, despite an offer to return to series regular status in 2006, she remained until the series finale on September 18, 2009. A young Lindsay Lohan played the character in a flashback on May 24, 1993.

=== 1975-1980 ===
Christina Thorpe (Gina Foy), known as "Chrissy", was born in 1975 to Holly Lindsey (Maureen Garrett) as the by-product of an extramarital affair with Roger Thorpe (Michael Zaslow). Holly led everyone to believe that Chrissy was the daughter of her husband, Ed Bauer (Mart Hulswit) but was forced to reveal the truth when Chrissy became ill and required a blood transfusion that Ed was not a match for. After learning the truth, Ed divorced Holly in 1976 but having grown to love Chrissy, he remained friends with Holly for her sake.

In 1979, Holly and Roger began a tumultuous marriage, which ended after Roger raped Holly in a fit of rage. After Holly was imprisoned for allegedly murdering Roger, Chrissy (now Cheryl Lynn Brown), who was too young to understand what was going on, began spending much of her time with the Bauer family. In 1980, after Roger was revealed to be alive, Holly fled with her daughter to the island of Santa Domingo, but an unstable Roger followed closely behind. After failing to kidnap Chrissy, Roger took Holly hostage instead but was rescued by Ed and his brother, Mike (Don Stewart). In the ensuing chaos, Roger fell to his death. With the experience proving too traumatizing for Holly, she and Chrissy left Springfield in 1980, with Holly refusing to discuss Roger and asking the Bauers not to contact them.

=== 1988-1992 ===
In 1988, a now 22 year old Christina (now Elizabeth Dennehy), who was now referring to herself as Blake, anonymously returned to Springfield after her relationship with her mother became strained. After a brief affair with Alan Spaulding (Christopher Bernau) in Mexico, he had sent Blake to Springfield to spy on his son Phillip (Grant Aleksander) who had stolen control of Spaulding Enterprises from him. After being hired as a Public Relations consultant at Spaulding, Blake befriended Johnny Bauer (James Goodwin), who came close to discovering her true identity. While Alan had plans to use Blake to regain control of Spaulding, Blake planned to seek power for herself as revenge for Alan's treatment of her late father but matters became complicated when she began to fall in love with Phillip.

While on a business trip with Phillip, Blake became frustrated and, in a drunken stupor, presumed she had married Phillip's business partner, a Sheik. After discovering that the "Sheik" was in fact a local bartender, Blake realized that Phillip had set her up. Blake was later able to acquire Phillip's confession of his illegal takeover of Spaulding on tape and planned to hand it over to Alan, when Phillip's aunt, Alexandra (Beverlee McKinsey), exposed her and forced Blake to conspire with her against Alan. When Phillip discovered the truth, he bitterly left Blake, who responded in guilt by overdosing on sleeping pills. While recovering at Cedars Hospital, her former stepfather, Ed (now Peter Simon), discovered her true identity and she soon reconciled with not just Phillip but Holly as well. Phillip and Blake later became engaged and were married in May 1989.

However, the wedding itself would end in chaos when Phillip and a man named Adam Malik were both shot. To the horror of all in attendance, Malik was revealed to be a very much alive Roger. Unable to cope with this revelation, Blake left town for several weeks before returning (now Sherry Stringfield) and unsuccessfully attempting to prove to Phillip that Alan had been the shooter. As Alan was sent to prison after Roger identified him as the shooter, he revealed to Phillip that he had falsified the death certificate of Phillip's former love, Beth Raines, leading to suspicion that she could still be alive. Fearing that Beth could indeed be alive and that Phillip would leave her for Beth, Blake set fire to a report that Roger had found proving that the body located in Beth's grave was not her. After Phillip learned from Vanessa Chamberlain (Maeve Kinkead) that Blake had destroyed the report, he became obsessed with learning about Beth, driving Blake into the arms of Gary Swanson (William Bell Sullivan).

Blake herself would soon come face to face with a mute Beth (Beth Chamberlin), who was living in the trailer of recent Spaulding hire Neil Everest (Patrick O'Connell), but said nothing in an effort to hold on to her marriage. After Phillip exhumed Beth's grave, Blake took drastic action and arranged to have him committed to a psychiatric hospital but would regret her decision once Phillip found Beth at the same facility and the two reunited.

In 1990, Blake, who had bitterly refused to grant Phillip a divorce, began an affair with Phillip's brother, Alan-Michael (Carl T. Evans) which stopped when he learned of her manipulations of Phillip and Beth. But Blake then faked a pregnancy, leading to their reconciliation and eventually to their engagement. Blake was unaware that her actions involving the fake pregnancy were videotaped by secret cameras set up by Alan-Michael's ex-wife, Harley Cooper (Beth Ehlers). The tape would later be discovered by Gary, who blackmailed Blake, only to have her blackmail him with the knowledge that his use of faulty materials resulted in a construction accident that killed Neil Everest's family. He was later able to destroy the evidence against him, forcing Blake to remain silent when Neil was killed and Phillip was accused of his murder. While Blake and Alan-Michael were on their honeymoon in Costa Verde, Gary arranged for Alan-Michael to be kidnapped for ransom. He vehemently denied his involvement when Blake confronted him at gunpoint. When Holly and Roger arrived to help Blake save Alan-Michael, Roger proved that Gary was involved and went on to rescue Alan-Michael (now Rick Hearst) from Gary's henchman. Unable to turn Gary over to the police for fear of him exposing Blake's fake pregnancy, Roger savagely beat him and threatened him to quit Spaulding.

Following the events in Costa Verde, and failed attempts to get pregnant, Blake briefly left town and told Alan-Michael that she had suffered a miscarriage. Gary, who quit Spaulding but remained in Springfield, continued to threaten Blake. After the brakes in Alan-Michael's car failed, she was convinced that Gary was responsible and once again threatened him at gunpoint. Suspecting something was off with Blake, Alan-Michael followed her and was accidentally shot when intervened, causing him to fall into a coma. Blake was subsequently sent to a psychiatric hospital for observation. From there, Gary kidnapped, holding her hostage in an abandoned warehouse, and demanded four million dollars in ransom. With the help of A.C. Mallet (Mark Derwin), Roger was able to rescue Blake. When a now recovered Alan-Michael came upon the scene, Gary exposed Blake's fake pregnancy, resulting in Alan-Michael bitterly divorcing her.

In 1991, Blake, hoping to reunite with Alan-Michael, assisted him in becoming the new president of Spaulding Enterprises. By this point, however, Alan-Michael had begun to fall for Greek immigrant Eleni Andros (Melina Kanakaredes). Blake then informed Immigration officials that Eleni was in the United States illegally. When the plan backfired and he married Eleni to keep her in the country, Blake sought comfort in Frank Cooper (Frank Dicopoulos) - who was also in love with Eleni - while she continued to pursue Alan-Michael. Despite a one-stand with Alan-Michael in 1992, she completely lost him to Eleni and also lost her job at Spaulding. Blaming Holly's interference for her problems, Blake sought revenge against her by seducing Ross Marler (Jerry verDorn) whom Holly was falling in love with. Weeks of flirtation between the two would follow and as Blake showed her vulnerable side, Ross would begin to soften toward her. Blake's reputation, however, continued to haunt her. When Ross discovered files on jewel thief Jenna Bradshaw (Fiona Hutchinson) had gone missing, he accused Blake of stealing them as a favor to Roger, who was married to Jenna. In the course of a heated argument between Ross and Blake during a blackout, the pair fell into bed for the first time.

As a result of his senatorial campaign, Ross dated Holly publicly while continuing to sleep with Blake, until Holly found the two of them in bed. By that point, Blake had started to develop genuine romantic feelings for Ross. Meanwhile, Roger had begun to suspect that Ross was carrying on an affair behind Holly's back but could not determine who with. He hired Gilly Grant (Amelia Marshall) to take photos of Ross and his secret lover and she was successful. When confronted by Roger, Blake (now Elizabeth Keifer) claimed that she was attempting to sabotage Ross's campaign but after she was gifted a new car, and believing it to be from Ross, she confessed her feelings for him.

=== Ross Marler and Ben Warren ===
Things got more complicated for the couple as Alan Spaulding began manipulating them and Ross' estranged daughter Dinah returned to tear them apart. Her suspicions of her stepdaughter led her to bug her rooms and create distrust in the family. After a one-night stand with Rick Bauer, she discovered she was pregnant with twins. She went to Roger and Amanda, who tried desperately to hide her transgression from Ross, but it would eventually come out when the twins had to undergo an operation. In 1997, things got worse when his brother Ben Warren came to town and began trying to blackmail her for sex. She eventually gave in, only to be caught by Ross. After accusing Ben of rape, Ross tried to shoot him and shot his wife by accident, paralyzing her. This didn't last because it was purely psychosomatic, yet she continued to charge Ben for rape, despite evidence that it was consensual. The proof fell into the hands of the mob and they were both blackmailed. Under the weight of guilt, she confessed the truth and Ross left her, suing for custody. She moved on with Ben and tried to help her mother when she learned that she was the Nursery Rhyme Stalker. She and Ross bonded over Holly's case and wound up making love.

Suffering through mental breakdowns, psychotic relatives and numerous affairs gave her plenty of fodder for her career as a romance novelist. This would often get her in trouble as her thinly veiled portraits of townspeople often led to their lives becoming endangered. Danger also stalked her when the crazed Tory came to town and attempted to steal Ross and the children away before trying to murder her. She would be constantly torn between loyalty and self-interest as she manipulated or went to ludicrous ends to protect her relationship with Ross, particularly from his daughter. In 1995, Blake had an affair with Rick Bauer and got pregnant and soon learned she was expecting twins. She learned that she was pregnant with children from both men as each man fathered one child. After months of working out the best possible situation for her sons Jason and Kevin, it was revealed that Ross was the father of both children. As Ross returned to his political career, she switched through several careers of her own until his accidental death.

=== Later years ===
Devastated and insecure, she soon entered into a relationship with mayoral rival Jeffrey O'Neill and became the author of the infamous Springfield Burns blog which she used to destroy the lives of her rivals and friends. After sabotaging Jeffrey's campaign, she won the mayoralty race only to be poisoned. The investigation quickly dug up the fact that she was the blogger. In her hospital bed she claimed that she had to lash out at everyone because they made her feel like she didn't exist. After lapsing into a coma for months, she eventually awakened and set her sights on Dinah and Mallet. Blake's schemes resulting in Dinah (who survived being shot in the head by a man from Mallet's past) received backlash from viewers. In 2008 Blake began pursuing Henry Cooper Bradshaw (AKA "Coop") much to the dismay of viewers. In 2009, Blake, while still in a supporting role, began to receive more sympathetic writing and an increase in screentime. She helped Reva Shayne cope after the death of her husband Jeffrey, helped Olivia Spencer and Natalia Rivera process their feelings for each other, and, after taking over as manager at the Cooper family restaurant Company, helped publish Coop's last book, using the advance to stop Company from being foreclosed. During this time Blake decided to finally move on from the memory of her beloved Ross, and she began talking over the computer with a man she met at a dating service. After a few weeks, they met, and the man was, to her surprise, Frank Cooper, her longtime friend and former lover. They decided to go out on a real date, and a year later, were still together.
