= Phillip Spaulding =

- Guiding Light character
- Grant Aleksander as Phillip Spaulding
- Portrayed by: Jarrod Ross (1977–1981); Grant Aleksander (1982–1984, 1986–2009); John Bolger (1985–1986)
- Duration: 1977–1991, 1996–2004, 2009
- First appearance: November 7, 1977
- Last appearance: September 18, 2009
- Created by: Bridget and Jerome Dobson
- Introduced by: Allen M. Potter
In-universe information
- Other names: Don Minyard
- Occupation: CEO and Chairman of Spaulding Enterprises; Owner of Company; Owner of WSPR-TV; President of Spaulding Enterprises; President of Spaulding Foundation; Worked at The Mirror; Author of Zanzibar
- Parents: Justin Marler; Jackie Scott
- Adoptive parents: Alan Spaulding; Elizabeth Granville
- Sisters: Samantha Marler
- Half-brothers: Gus Aitoro (adoptive); Alan-Michael Spaulding (adoptive)
- Half-sisters: Peyton Spaulding (adoptive)
- Wife: Mindy Lewis (1984); India von Halkein (1985–86); Blake Thorpe (1989–90); Beth Raines (1990–96, 2009–); Harley Cooper (1998–2001); Olivia Spencer (2004)
- Sons: Zach Spaulding; James Spaulding
- Daughters: Lizzie Spaulding; Emma Spaulding
- Grandchildren: Sarah Randall
- Grandfathers: Brandon Spaulding (adoptive)
- Grandmothers: Emily Marler; Evelyn Scott; Penelope Winthrop (adoptive)
- Uncles: Ross Marler
- Aunts: Alexandra Spaulding (adoptive); Victoria Tamberlain (adoptive); Amanda Spaulding (adoptive)
- Nephews: Rafe Rivera
- First cousins: Dinah Marler; Jason Marler; Kevin Marler; Clarissa Marler; Lujack Spaulding (adoptive); Nick McHenry Spaulding (adoptive); Vicky Spaulding (adoptive)

Phillip Granville Spaulding is a fictional character from the CBS soap opera Guiding Light. Phillip has been portrayed by three different actors, most notably by Grant Aleksander.

The character is the adopted son of business mogul, Alan Spaulding, and his first ex-wife, Elizabeth. The role was originated in 1977 by Jarrod Ross, who departed the series in 1981. Aleksander first appeared on December 22, 1982, and left in 1984. From 1985 to 1986, John Bolger played the role of Phillip. Aleksander then returned and played the role from 1986 to February 25, 1991. Five years later, in 1996, he returned again, playing Phillip until November 18, 2004, when the character of Phillip was shot onscreen and presumed to be dead. In July 2005, Phillip was revealed to be alive (but not shown onscreen) when he was visited by Alan. In February 2009, the character of Phillip returned to Springfield, and remained until the series finale on September 18, 2009.

Aleksander has received several awards for his portrayal of Phillip.

== Storylines ==
Seven-year-old Phillip Spaulding's world would change forever in 1977 when his mother befriended Jackie Marler; only he wouldn't know it yet. The son of wealthy Alan Spaulding and Elizabeth Granville, Phillip had his every wish catered to and was exceptionally close to his mother. While his parents were going through a nasty divorce in 1978, Phillip was having chest pains and started receiving treatment from Dr. Justin Marler, Jackie's ex-husband. Phillip bonded with Justin and after his parents divorced, he encouraged his mother to marry Justin in 1979. At about the same time, Alan married Jackie. Phillip was content to have Justin and Jackie as stepparents and became close to both. However, in 1980, Justin and Jackie would divorce their prospective spouses and find love again with each other. In 1981, Elizabeth would unexpectedly leave Springfield for Switzerland and left Phillip in the care of the Marlers. Though confused as to why his mother left and why he was living with his "Aunt Jackie" and "Uncle Justin" instead of his father, Alan, Phillip accepted the situation and soon left Springfield to attend Lincoln Prep School. Late that year, while Phillip was on Christmas break from Lincoln Prep, he finally apologized to Mike Bauer about his treatment of Mike during the time Mike and Elizabeth were lovers.

Thrown out of Lincoln Prep School at 17 (SORAS), Phillip returned to Springfield in 1982 to attend Springfield High. He and Freddie [later calling himself Rick] Bauer became best friends when Phillip covered for Freddie after Freddie, who was driving with Phillip in his car, was pulled over for speeding and didn't have his driver's license. By this time, Jackie had died in a plane crash and Justin was seeing an Italian woman named Helena Manzini, a relationship Phillip disapproved of because he felt it was too soon after Jackie's death. Meanwhile, Phillip was hanging out with a rough crowd. When Phillip and Freddie were nearly involved in an accident, they realized perhaps the crowd they were hanging out with really weren't their friends and they stopped associating with them. Not long afterwards, Phillip met his first love, Melinda "Mindy" Sue Lewis, who in 1983, out of insecurity, staged a rather dramatic accident while riding her horse and was consequently hospitalized. During his visits to Mindy in the hospital, he developed a strong attraction to her roommate, Beth Raines.

Both Phillip and Rick were attracted to Beth, but Phillip backed off and continued to endure Mindy's spoiled behavior in deference to Rick's attraction to Beth. At the senior prom Rick and Beth went together, as did Mindy and Phillip but it was Phillip and Beth who were named King and Queen. Finally on the night of Mindy's 18th birthday party at the Country Club, Phillip and Beth finally confessed their true feelings for each other in the stables. However, Beth's stepfather Bradley found them and shocked Phillip by telling him the truth about his parentage: Alan and Elizabeth weren't his real parents; the Marlers were. Apparently, Alan felt his wife was too fragile to handle the fact their baby was stillborn and he bought the child Jackie was giving up. After Phillip learned the truth, he was not only furious at Justin and Alan, but also at Mindy and Rick, who both knew the truth before he did and didn't tell him. Angry and hurt, Phillip told Rick he was in love with Beth. Though he had initially rejected both his fathers, Phillip, upon learning Justin was flying out of town, tracked him down at the airport and not only forgave him for keeping his parentage a secret, but also gave his blessing for Justin and Helena to marry.

It was at this point Beth was raped by Bradley. Ashamed of what happened, she told no one and rejected Phillip. Phillip turned to Mindy for comfort and she seduced him without using birth control. Alan was also relieved to see Phillip and Beth growing apart since as far as he was concerned Beth was from a lower class and didn't deserve his son. Beth soon moved into the boarding house to try to get away from Bradley, but he got a court order and forced her to return home. When Beth returned home, Phillip was waiting, and they jumped out of a window and ran away to New York. After they had been running for a while they found themselves near Central Park and nearly out of money, Beth was working on some artistic sketches when both came upon a sidewalk Santa Claus (who preferred to be called Nick) who asked if they needed help. Though Phillip rudely tried to decline, Beth told the man they were nearly broke and had nowhere to stay and perhaps could not afford a hotel. Nick being the Good Samaritan he was, took pity on the young teenage couple and urged them to follow him through Central Park. Nick had led them to a place where he had led many people who were lost and homeless or poor or down on their luck. Nick turned them over to the others staying there and asked them to watch over Beth and Phillip. Eventually with Nick (Santa's) help, Beth told Phillip about the rape. Phillip promised to protect her and they pledged to never let anything come between them again. Meanwhile, Mindy and Rick had raced to New York to find the pair and the four friends took odd jobs in order to survive and they enjoyed the sights and sounds of New York. Eventually, in January 1984, Bradley tracked them down and in order to evade him they dressed up as clowns and engaged in a mime act in the park. Bradley saw through their disguise and got in a violent struggle with Phillip in Central Park that ended when Bradley almost fell off a cliff. Beth and Phillip saved him though and warned him to back off. With Bradley apparently no longer a threat, Phillip and Beth returned to Springfield.

Back in Springfield, Alan hired Bradley with the intent of transferring him out of town in order to separate Phillip and Beth. Meanwhile, Phillip's Aunt Alex discovered Alan's schemes and revealed it to Phillip. Alex had become extremely protective of Phillip and Beth and when she found out about the rape, she made sure Bradley was arrested. At this time, Beth began to tutor Lujack, the leader of a street gang named the Galahads. Beth hoped this would help Lujack separate himself from his gang. But Darcy, Lujack's jealous girlfriend, had other ideas. Phillip was jealous but he and Beth still planned to marry. At the same time, Mindy was pregnant and told everyone Rick was the father. Then the day of Beth's wedding, Mindy's father, Billy, went to the church where Beth and Phillip were about to be married and confronted Mindy. He wanted to know if it was true the father of her baby was really Phillip. Beth overheard everything and at the altar she slapped Phillip and called off the wedding. Phillip wanted to be part of the baby's life. Mindy agreed but only if Phillip married her. Phillip married Mindy and they spent their honeymoon at Cross Creek. However, the pair divorced after Mindy miscarried.

Once again, Phillip focused his attention on Beth, who by now was in love with Lujack. Feeling very rejected and angry, Phillip then discovered Lujack and Floyd Parker were turning the Galahads old garage into a night club. Phillip hired a crooked tradesman named Andy Ferris to sabotage the construction of the club but Andy went too far, and when the building blew up Beth was injured and blinded. Phillip felt very guilty but he could not bring himself to admit his wrongdoing so he enrolled Beth in a school for the blind. However, India von Halkein learned of the nightclub incident and threatened to tell Beth, thereby blackmailing her way into becoming his second wife. Phillip complied with India's demand but refused to consummate the union. However, when India started to notice Phillip and Beth renewing their friendship, she told Beth how Phillip had caused her blindness. Beth angrily rejected Phillip, but didn't tell Lujack the reason because she did not want to cause any more bad blood between them. At Lujack and Beth's engagement party in February 1985, Phillip, having grown to appreciate India's tenacity and wanting to gain control of Spaulding, announced India was pregnant (untrue, Phillip lied). Meanwhile, Lujack brought Andy to the party to play the blackmail tape and expose Phillip as the one who caused the accident. A scuffle over the tape occurred and Andy was shot and killed, and the tape was stolen. A lengthy murder mystery ensued with Lujack being erroneously convicted. By this time Phillip and India had consummated their marriage and India had faked a pregnancy test to make Phillip believe she was actually pregnant with his child. With the demands of the trial out of the way and Alex more determined than ever to run her out of town, India was more desperate than ever to cement her bond with Phillip. Conveniently an old family friend, Dr. Lyon, came visiting, and India employed the services of his never-fail love potion (sort of a gypsy version of Viagra). India began to mega-dose Phillip with the potion in hopes of making their previous baby announcement come true. But before India's desires came true, Phillip became ill from the potion and India was exposed for drugging Phillip. Eventually Beth convinced Phillip to come clean about his deal with Andy and they became friends again. Ironically the police didn't believe Phillip's story but by now plenty of people shared the suspicion India had murdered Andy. In the end, the real culprit turned out to be Floyd, who was holding India in a cabin where he forced her to sign a false confession. Luckily, Lujack and Beth eventually tracked them down and Floyd went to jail. Feeling a great deal of compassion for India, Phillip discovered they really did have a lot in common and agreed to remain married.

Still jealous of Phillip's relationship with Beth and mistakenly believing that Phillip was ready to end their marriage, India began an affair with Simon Hall and when Phillip caught them kissing in early 1986, he quickly divorced India. After Phillip wrote a novel based on his and Beth's love, he and Beth found their way back to one another since Lujack was by now deceased. The couple's lives would be forever changed when Beth began working at a local museum for a Professor Blackburn, who had gotten his hands on the cornerstone of the Von Halkein estate in Andorra. India knew it contained gold and tried to steal it back from him. But the Professor protected the cornerstone until his death. He knocked India unconscious, shot Phillip, and held Beth hostage on a boat in Stony Lake. Some time later Blackburn's dead body turned up, Beth's shoe and some fabric from her dress were found but she was nowhere to be found. Phillip was devastated and vowed to find her, but Alan fabricated some evidence to make it look like Beth was really dead.

In 1987, Phillip had a relationship with his assistant Chelsea Reardon and they investigated the black art scene. During their investigation, Chelsea learned Alan was also involved in the black art market but only told her sister, Maureen about this since she feared bad blood between father and son. Though Alan secretly burnt down Phillip's house to stop the investigation, Phillip finally learned about it. When Chelsea and Jackson Freemont discovered Warren Andrews killed the head of the black art market, Paul Valère, Warren kidnapped them and Alan, but luckily Phillip saved them and Warren was arrested. Though Phillip was shot by Warren's hit man and left in critical condition, he survived with Rick's help. Chelsea then quit as Phillip's assistant and began to work for Alan at Spaulding while she and Phillip remained as lovers. There was just one problem. Phillip was still obsessed with the love of his life, the late Beth, and that made Chelsea frustrated. At this time, Jackson, noticing Chelsea's singing talent, became her business manager and began to vie with Phillip for her affections. When Chelsea realized they were fighting an old rivalry for Beth rather than a rivalry for her, she lost interest in both men. Phillip wrote her a letter telling her his true feelings for her, but Jackson intercepted it. When Chelsea found out about the letter, she and Phillip got back together and when Phillip forgave Chelsea for her affair with a married man in New York years ago they became engaged However, at this time Phillip was obsessed with wresting power away from Alan and sought the help of Alexandra and the Lewis's to help him. Finally, in 1988, when Chelsea (who wanted Phillip to reconcile with his father) found out about Phillip's plans to wrest control of Spaulding from Alan, she tried to warn Alan, and Phillip locked her up in the Towers. Disgusted, Chelsea bitterly broke up with Phillip.

Not long after, Phillip had an affair with Rick's girlfriend, Meredith Reade after the couple had broken up. Distraught, Phillip agreed not to tell Rick about it and was genuinely relieved when the couple patched things up and got married. Later Meredith found herself pregnant and although Rick knew he wasn't the father, agreed to raise the child as his own without knowing whom the father was. Along came Blake Lindsey, Phillip's PR-agent at Spaulding. Phillip fell in love with her but didn't know Blake was actually paid by Alan to spy on him. After Alex revealed Blake's schemes and her true identity as the daughter of presumed dead Roger Thorpe, Phillip bitterly left Blake but, later, he forgave her and the couple reconciled. Then tragedy struck in April 1989, when during the delivery of Meredith's baby, Rick was forced to choose between Meredith's life and that of the unborn child. Rick chose Meredith. Later, Rick learned from a letter from Alan that Phillip was the father. Though Phillip tried to explain it happened before the couple had married and after they had temporarily broken up, Rick still felt betrayed and it took him a long time to forgive Phillip. Prior to Phillip and Blake's wedding, a series of accidents started occurring. The trouble came to a climax at their wedding when gunfire rang out and Phillip was shot! It was then that the truth came out: Alan was behind the accidents in order to keep Blake from marrying Phillip and accidentally shot Phillip after having a struggle with a very much alive Roger. While Roger was exposed to everyone, Alan wasn't exposed immediately as the shooter. Roger was first suspected but finally convinced Ross, Phillip and Alan-Michael of Alan's crimes so the three decided to trick Alan into walking again. While Alex was in Europe, Roger appeared into the Spaulding mansion and appeared to shoot Phillip and Alan-Michael. Shocked, Alan stood up from his wheelchair, was exposed of all crimes and went to jail. Immediately after his arrest Alan told Phillip he'd forged Beth's death certificate: there was no proof Beth was dead.

Though Phillip tried to reassure Blake he was over Beth, he became convinced she was alive. Not long after, a man arrived in town claiming to have kidnapped Beth and demanded a $1 million ransom. Hoping it was true, Phillip paid the money only to learn he'd been lied to by Dana Jones and her lover, Bruce Daly. At this time Bradley was released from prison. Learning the plot, he confronted Dana's lover and was knocked unconscious. Though Phillip suspected Bradley of swindling him first, he later learned the truth. Though Daly was caught, he escaped, and the money (unknowingly pocketed by Roger) was never recovered. Meanwhile, Phillip was becoming obsessed with finding Beth. Unbeknownst to Phillip, Blake discovered an amnesiac and mute Beth was living with Spaulding employee Neil Everest just outside town. Fearing Phillip would leave her for Beth, when Blake learned Phillip had Beth's grave exhumed, she had him committed in the Willow Hills mental institution for his "delusions" about Beth. For Phillip, he seemed to prove Blake right when he reacted violently towards her. Both Gary Swanson and Neil were please with this development: Gary because Blake now had Phillip's power of attorney, and Neil, because the field was clear for him to marry Beth. Of course as with any plans devious, Blake's attempt to take over Phillip's life was about to hit major snags and fall apart and Neil contributed to it.

While Blake had Phillip committed for having defied a court order to exhume Beth Raines's grave, Neil decided to tell Beth about her past and accompanied her to Lillian's house. But, Beth, seeing her childhood home and remembering Bradley refused to go in and then ran away when she saw Bradley. Beth ran away to Clayton where the Willow Hills Sanitarium was and with her aphasia checked herself her into the sanitarium! Eventually, Phillip ended up seeing Beth, as did Lillian and Rick. Later, Blake tried to keep Phillip in Willow Hills, but Rick and Lillian told the court that Phillip was as sane as they were and he was released. But Blake still had his power of attorney. That was until Blake did one more really stupid thing in her plan to retain control. Phillip had the Spaulding mansion phones wired to monitor every call Blake took. Blake took a call from Neil about the upcoming marriage of him and Beth at the courthouse and Blake lied to Phillip saying the phone call was not from Neil! On Christmas Eve, Neil and Beth were about to marry, at the courthouse, with Blake in attendance, when Phillip and Rick on to Blake's plan crashed the ceremony and whisked Beth away! Although Beth tried to explain otherwise, Phillip was convinced Neil had been involved in Beth's kidnapping and fired him from Spaulding Enterprises. Phillip also found out Neil was suspected of causing the death of his wife and stepchildren in Pittsburgh, when the building they were in Neil had helped build collapsed. He also accused Neil of raping Beth! Neil's cause was not helped when WSPR-TV talk show host, Johnny Bauer accused Neil, over the holiday season, of being the mysterious person buying up property along Fifth Street for dubious ends. Determined to prove his innocence, on January 11, 1990, Neil helped Beth relive her kidnapping at the hands of Professor Blackburn. Beth recalled killing Blackburn when he tried to attack her, and she realized her aphasia stemmed from her lack of guilt over his death. At this point, Phillip found Neil and Beth and when the men began fighting, Beth finally spoke, yelling at them to stop.

As the year continued, Neil's true past came to light when he was able to prove the collapse was due not to his design, but to the faulty materials Spaulding had purchased. Grateful to Neil for helping Beth, Phillip voted for him to be rehired. Anxious to have a future with Beth, Phillip ended his calamitous marriage to Blake. She convinced Gary to spy on Phillip and Beth for her, hoping to get evidence of Phillip's unfaithfulness. A devious Gary agreed, and then tried to score points with Phillip by telling him Blake was having an affair. Despite her extracurricular activities with both Gary and Alan-Michael, Blake vehemently refused when Beth asked her to give Phillip an amicable divorce. Phillip asked Beth to marry him anyway. Not wanting to rush into anything, Beth said no, but their feelings ran deep and on Valentine's Day they made love. Meanwhile, one day in March, when Blake and Gary were rummaging through Neil's trailer to find a way to force Beth to stay with Neil, Beth caught them and after having a major verbal fight with Blake over Blake destroying some of her art sketches, Beth collapsed. When Gary and Blake took Beth to Cedars, they were all shocked to learn from Rick that Beth was pregnant! Beth assumed the baby was Neil's and told Phillip, who suggested they pass the child off as his. Unaware the baby really was Phillip's, Beth decided to be honest with Neil, but Blake, who stole Beth's file from the doctor's office, told Neil before Beth could.! A furious Neil refused to allow Phillip to raise his child. In April, Beth was ecstatic when Dr. Sedgwick showed her a sonogram revealing her child had been conceived in February 1990, and not in December 1989, which meant the child was Phillip's! In the meantime, trying to get back on Alan-Michael's good side, Blake agreed to give Phillip a divorce, no strings attached. However, things were about to get very bad for Phillip. The day he was to meet Neil, Neil knocked him out and left him to die. As Neil was leaving up the stairs, a double-crossing Gary confronted Neil and pushed down a flight of stairs into the garage. Blake showed up to see Gary and Neil fighting, and Gary convinced her Neil had to be subdued when he showed her the bomb Neil had set.

After tying up Neil, Blake saw Phillip also unconscious and was sure Gary had knocked him out. Blake then tricked Gary and was able to tie him up next to Neil. Blake called Roger who set Gary free. Meanwhile, Neil mumbled “Phillip”, leading Roger to suspect that was who hit him. Roger tried and failed to defuse the bomb and Neil died in the explosion. With the audiotape of Neil murmuring "Phillip" as the one who knocked him out, Phillip's wallet being found in the wreckage of the garage, and threats Phillip had made against Neil's life, this was all enough to get Phillip arrested for Neil's murder. Trying to avoid prosecution and find out who the real murderer was, Phillip faked his own death, stealing a corpse (with Rick's help) in order to do so. Phillip fled to the island of Capria, near Mexico, and was shocked to meet India there. He promised India his Spaulding stock if she would keep quiet about his being alive and went to Springfield to discover what happened to Beth since she didn't follow him out of town. After trying to get Phillip's assets from Alan and Alex, India finally gave up and helped Phillip. When Phillip returned to town, he was shocked to discover that Beth and Rick had married to throw the police off track. After Phillip threatened Gary whom he suspected was Neil's murderer, Gary paid a killer to kill Phillip. The plan failed and finally Det. A.C. Mallet and Roger discovered Gary was Neil's accomplice and murderer. At the same time, Phillip revealed himself alive after the birth of his daughter, Lizzie. Though innocent, Phillip, Beth and Rick were sentenced to perform community service out of town for fraud. After marrying in February 1991, Phillip and Beth moved to Arizona with Lizzie to carry out their community service.

Over the next few years, Phillip avoided any contact with the Spauldings when suddenly in April 1996, Alex called him to ask him to attend Alan-Michael's wedding to Lucy Cooper in Orlando, Florida. Although Phillip told Alex he wouldn't come, he indeed had plans to attend the wedding to Beth's dismay. Phillip arrived early and exposed himself to only Rick and told him he had plans to find the one who had cost him five years of his life. Phillip had found out someone else was involved in the incident which left him accused of Neil's murder. Gary had asked Phillip to visit him in prison where he gave him note that he had once found in Neil's trailer, which proved Neil had been paid by an "A. Spaulding" to get Phillip's fingerprints on the bomb. Although Rick advised him to drop his investigation, Phillip refused. During the wedding ceremony, Phillip wore a mask and when Alan was about to make a toast, Phillip stopped him and unmasked himself to the shock of all of the guests. Though Amanda, Alan and Alan-Michael weren't happy to see him, Phillip decided to return to Springfield anyway. While conducting his investigation, Phillip then visited Beth in Arizona but she left him for good since he'd refused to drop his vendetta and return home. Meanwhile, Alan-Michael was trying to prevent Phillip's return to Spaulding and, to set him up, he pretended to make up with his brother and tried to send him to a fake business trip to California so that he could spread lies about Phillip to the board. Phillip didn't leave but arrived during a board meeting to see Alan-Michael's actions against him. Not long after, Amanda exposed Alan-Michael as "A. Spaulding" through a letter from Neil to him. After Phillip asked Alan to support him during his fight against Alan-Michael Alan collapsed due to intense pain in his back and was rushed to Cedars. While recovering in his bed, he confessed to the family he was actually "A. Spaulding" and had hired Neil to set Phillip up since he had been disappointed in Phillip.

Furious, Phillip disowned Alan and later made up with Alan-Michael and made plans to move to New York. As for Alan, he was suffering from paralysis, and giving up, refused to attend physical therapy sessions. Although Phillip arranged for him to be transferred to a rehabilitation clinic, he could not be persuaded by Alan to stay in town. However, Alan still would not admit the seriousness of his injury and refused to heed the doctor's warning he would have to relearn how to use his body. Phillip dropped by the clinic on his way out of town, where Alex tried to convince him of the seriousness of his father's injury. Though Phillip refused to visit Alan, he relented when Alex begged him to stay to see him. The doctor explained to Alan he had a long, arduous journey ahead of him. When Alex and Phillip entered his room, Alan ordered them to leave. Alex left, but Phillip stayed behind and when he saw how resistant Alan was to his physical therapy, Phillip told him how pathetic he was for giving up so easily and he still blamed him for ruining his life. Although Alan-Michael tried to convince Phillip to just leave town and write Alan off for good, Phillip found that he couldn't and remained, staying for a while at the Bauers. Not long after, Phillip was shocked to learn Rick was the father of one of Blake's babies! Although Phillip demanded Ross be told the truth, or else he'd do it, he found he couldn't hurt Ross like that and kept quiet. Meanwhile, Phillip's anger at Alan softened as he sympathized with Alan's physical condition. Knowing Alan was giving up on himself, Phillip and Alan-Michael concocted a plan with Roger and Amanda to make Alan think they were selling Alan's company Advantage Systems to Roger with the hope Alan would get the urge to fight Roger and thus, get the urge to walk again. Their plan was a success. Meanwhile, after Lizzie had visited Phillip on Christmas, Phillip realized how much he missed Beth. It was too late because Lillian had given him divorce papers from Beth. At this time, Roger and Amanda plotted to take Spaulding over while the family tried to stop them. When Alan-Michael and Lucy left town, Phillip became president again.

That spring, Phillip was surprised to see his former sister-in-law, Harley Cooper at the Country Club masquerading as a woman named Starla. In the process of conducting the sting, Phillip and Harley started having feelings for one another which culminated into a kiss. Later, the pair left for New York to trap Jeffrey. Making it seem like "Starla" was going to get money from Phillip, the pair acted as though she was trying to seduce him, proving it by showing Jeffrey a surveillance tape of Phillip and Starla "making love". However, once the camera was shut off, the fake lovemaking became real as Phillip and Harley gave in to their passion. Later Phillip lied to Jeffrey stating he killed Harley during wild sex and when Jeffrey was ready to turn him to the police and to flee with Jenna, he was arrested for fraud when Harley and Jenna exposed him. Meanwhile, Harley and Phillip agreed to forget about happened that night and remain just friends. Then Harley and Jenna decided to join forces and began a detective agency. Their first assignment was to help Reva to find her long-lost sister. Not long after, Harley received a call from Mallet telling her he wanted a divorce since he was in love with another woman. Hurt and angry, Harley was consoled by Phillip. Meanwhile, Jenna and Harley learned Reva's nemesis, Annie Dutton, may have information on Reva's sister, and so they went to the mental hospital where Annie was staying. But when Security caught them snooping around, Jenna passed Harley off as her sister, Caitlin, and, to Harley's dismay, checked her into the mental institution. "Caitlin" then became Annie's roommate and apparently befriended her. Although Phillip tried to get Harley out of there, Harley was determined to follow through with the plan. Annie discovered who her new "friend" was and with help of the guards, drugged Harley with a psychotic drug. Luckily Phillip came to her rescue and admitted he too was falling in love with her.

Just then, Beth returned to town with Lizzie determined to win Phillip. Anxious to get Phillip back, Beth used Lizzie by getting her hopes up and having her lie that she wanted to stay at home rather than go with Phillip for the night. That same evening, Lizzie held up the mistletoe for the pair to kiss; as Phillip leaned in to kiss Beth's cheek, Beth turned and kissed him passionately on the lips. Later, Beth warned Harley she wanted Phillip back, to which Harley responded that would never happen. While pining for Phillip, Beth became friends with attorney Ben Warren, who was far from reputable. When Phillip warned Beth about how unscrupulous Ben was, she told him to mind his own business. However, Ben soon realized Beth was just using him to make Phillip jealous and offered to help. Later, to make Phillip jealous, Beth faked receiving a phone call from Ben, and made New Year's plans with him. Phillip made it known that he didn't want Ben in his house, but Beth said she will go out somewhere with him anyway. She got herself into more trouble by deciding to stay in Springfield and accept a job. Harley, meanwhile, wasn't happy to see Beth either, especially since she was insecure over Phillip's feelings for Beth. Her fears compounded when Phillip expressed his displeasure at Beth's new friendship with Ben Warren. Although Phillip tried to assure Harley his heart belonged to her, Harley couldn't quite be sure. In 1998, Phillip proved his love for Harley by asking her to move in with him. Elated, Harley accepted the offer but was still disconcerted over the bond Phillip and Beth shared. When Beth thanked Harley for finding a lost Lizzie, she antagonized Harley by telling her to give Phillip some time to be with his family and continued to provoke her by mentioning the phone call she made to Mallet. Angry, Harley attacked Beth but was pulled off by Eleni. To Harley's relief, Phillip wasn't angry but instead understood.

Their relationship took a step back when Beth attempted suicide by throwing herself in front of a car. Guilt-ridden, Phillip offered to stay at the mansion to take care of a rattled Lizzie. After overhearing Lizzie ask Phillip not to make her take care of her mommy alone, Harley got suspicious and starting investigating Beth's past in Arizona. In the process she learned Beth had accidents before. She also discovered Beth had a boyfriend in Arizona named Carl. Harley decided to find him in order to ask him about Beth. Learning she was being investigated, Beth blasted Harley, who remained undeterred. Finally, Beth admitted to Harley about her abusive relationship with Carl but left insulted when Harley continued to interrogate her. Beth then told Phillip about Carl and Harley's meddling before Harley got to tell him her side of it. When Harley finally got to Phillip, he knew the whole story and yelled at Harley for interfering and jumped to Beth's defense. Not long after, Carl, upon learning Harley was asking about him, arrived in town threatening Harley to stay out of his business. Although Carl denied hurting Beth, Harley is soon able to trick him into admitting it. Later, she convinced Beth to help her arrest Carl. Using Beth as bait, the plan was for Harley to tape record Carl admitting his abusiveness. Harley, realizing she forgot her gun, left the scene before Carl got there. When she returned, Carl was dead and Beth was the prime suspect. During the investigation, Harley became unnerved at Phillip's attempts to protect Beth, even going as far as him suppressing evidence. Later, when Beth confessed to killing Carl in self-defense, both Harley and Phillip were unconvinced and investigated further. They soon discovered the true killer was Phillip's daughter, Lizzie! Worried about Lizzie, Harley left Phillip so that he could be with his daughter in her time of need. But Phillip wouldn't have it and convinced Harley he could be with her and be a part of his daughter's life at the same time. When Phillip proposed, Harley happily accepted and the couple made plans to marry, however when the wedding plans seemed to get out of hand, the couple decided to elope in New York. However, to their surprise, their elopement wasn't quite the secret they thought it was and they found Buzz and Phillip's Aunt Alex arranged a beautiful wedding for them at City Hall.

Trouble began to brew again with the arrival of Harley's daughter Daisy, now called Susan, who was in search of her real mother now that her adoptive mother had died. In 1999, after telling Harley and Phillip her father had "changed" after her mother's death, Harley allowed Susan to stay the night at her place, to Phillip's disapproval. After calling Susan's father, Jim, Harley suggested they stay in Springfield for the holidays. Pleased to have a mother figure again, Susan was determined to fix Harley up with Jim and kept manipulating them to be alone together. Determined to stay in Springfield, Susan overdosed on medication. The plan worked with a guilt-ridden Harley wishing she could have seen the signs and suggesting that Susan should stay in town. However, Phillip disagreed and tried to encourage Harley to let go and allow Susan and Jim to go on with their lives. As Phillip and Harley continued to debate about Susan's presence in their lives, Harley learned she was pregnant. After learning of Harley's pregnancy, a hurt Susan left Springfield to live with Jim but later corresponded with Harley by phone. Later, Susan called Harley asking for help after she shoplifted a dress, telling her she was at a strange bus station outside Springfield. So, Harley has arrived at the bus station outside of Springfield to collect Susan. While there, a creepy man who had been eyeing Susan turned his attention to Harley. The two of them struggled, and Harley managed to kick him in the groin. Meanwhile, Jim arrived and flattened the perpetrator. When Phillip showed up, he and Jim argued about Harley's involvement in Susan's life with Jim complaining Susan was envious of the life Phillip and Harley lead. Phillip offered to solve the problem by moving the two of them to Springfield and gave Jim a job at Spaulding. Harley was forced to mediate between Phillip and Jim who did not get along with Jim even ended up quitting Spaulding to work at Lewis Construction. However, Phillip continued to grate on Jim, and when Jim threatened to leave town, Harley convinced Phillip to give him a reason to stay. So, to please Harley, Phillip bribed Jim to stay (although by now Jim was dating Beth so he was already planning on staying anyway).

That summer, Harley finally gave birth to a son, who was named Alan Cooper Spaulding, with Harley deciding to nickname him "Zach" after the lead in Phillip's novel. Things couldn't have been better when Harley and her new family agreed to join her best friend, Cassie Layne, and her new fiancé, Prince Richard for a Thanksgiving celebration in San Cristobel. After the celebration, Phillip, Beth and Jim were forced to leave early for business reasons, however, their plane crashed into the mountains. All three were o.k., but Jim opted to leave and brave the cold on his own in an attempt to bring help back. Believing that they were going to die, Phillip and Beth prepared a videotape to be made for Lizzie. Emotions high, they started reminiscing about the past and sought comfort in each other's arms with the video still recording. After being rescued, both decided to keep their lovemaking a secret and go on with their separate lives.

In 2000, the unexpected happened: Beth found herself pregnant with Phillip's child. Convinced Phillip would leave Harley to marry her again, Beth told him about the child. When Phillip refused to marry her, she became afraid Jim would leave her and threatened to have an abortion if Phillip told anyone the child was his. And so worried about Beth's state of mind (as well as his own marriage), Phillip reluctantly agreed to keep the child's true paternity a secret while Beth married Jim, Phillip giving the bride away. Their tryst wasn't a complete secret: the missing video was found by Prince Edmund Winslow who used it to blackmail Phillip when Phillip threatened to fire him from Spaulding. Phillip's hatred of Edmund wasn't lost on Harley and when she demanded to know the cause, Rick covered by saying Edmund was blackmailing him. At the same time, the Spauldings were dismayed when Lizzie was diagnosed with leukemia.. With Lizzie's condition worsening, her only chance of surviving was a bone marrow transfusion from the baby Beth was carrying. When Jim refused to have his child delivered prematurely in order to save Lizzie, Phillip blurted out the horrible truth: the child Beth was carrying wasn't Jim's; it was his. In the end, Harley refused to forgive Phillip and asked for a divorce.

At the same time, Jim died heroically in a fire at Christmastime. Almost immediately after, Beth accepted the friendship and support of Edmund. In 2001, against everyone's advice, Beth became his sole champion and encouraged him to secure the crown for himself when he discovered he was the true heir to the throne. Though Phillip tried to show Beth that Edmund couldn't be trusted by telling her Edmund was fixing the island's election, she went to Edmund who immediately used the information to his advantage and went to the press himself, calling the election invalid and declaring himself ruler of San Cristobel. Edmund had Richard arrested and Phillip talked his way past the prison guard and into Richard's cell. When the guard returned, Richard was gone and Phillip was in his place. When Edmund learned what Phillip had done, he had him shackled in the jail. Although Beth was able to save Phillip by convincing Edmund to simply deport him, Phillip told Beth he was seeking sole custody of their children to keep them away from Edmund. Phillip returned weeks later though when Beth asked that the children come for her and Edmund's coronation. Not long after the coronation, he married Beth who became his princess. Mere weeks later, Beth would learn everything people had been saying about Edmund was true when she learned he was holding Cassie captive! Confronted by Beth, a desperate Edmund locked her away but Beth was able to escape from the tower. Luckily, Phillip and Noah saw what Beth was doing and when she fell to the ground, Luckily, Beth was alright and returned to Springfield. After all those months of intrigue, Phillip returned to Springfield in time to see a very pregnant Harley. Instantly assuming she was pregnant with his child, Phillip railed at her that he was the last to know. On the defensive, Harley pointed out he had spent the better part of the winter consumed with Beth in San Cristobel and then informed him he was not the father of her baby. Weeks later, Phillip would be shocked to learn from Edmund just who was the baby's father: Rick.

Furious, Phillip accused Rick of doing this purposely to hurt him (out of revenge for what happened with Meredith Reade) and refused to forgive him. Not long after, Beth ran to Mexico to get a quickie divorce. Edmund caught up with her and again begged her to go back to him. But Beth refused and ran off. While trying to get away from Edmund, Beth was caught in a flash flood and presumed dead. That fall, Phillip was able to get testimony from two witnesses that Edmund had been chasing after Beth when she died, however, the point became moot when Beth suddenly turned up in Springfield alive! Though she claimed to be suffering from memory lapses, Phillip was increasingly suspicious of her strange behavior and personality change. Not long after Beth's return, Phillip learned Harley had Rick's baby, but refused to see the child. However, around Thanksgiving, when the pair was looking for a lost Lizzie and James, Phillip and Rick talked things over and resumed their friendship. Meanwhile, after doing some digging, in early 2002, Phillip learned the woman in town was an imposter named Lorelei Hills. Though Alan wanted her arrested, Phillip was afraid that would traumatize Lizzie and simply asked Lorelei to leave. Though Alan went against Phillip's wishes and had her arrested anyway, when she became ill, Phillip, against his better judgment, allowed her to be cared for at the mansion. The trouble was, she was now insisting she was Beth! Skeptical at first, the more time he spent with her the more he realized this was truly Beth Raines. Beth was the imposter! By the time Phillip realized this, Beth had left Springfield with Edmund! Tracking her down at an old silver mine, Phillip became trapped. Though Beth reasserted herself and raced to the mine to free Phillip, the mine entrance shut while she was inside, trapping them both. Edmund arrived, causing another split between Beth/Lorelei. Edmund accidentally trapped them in the mine a second time, but Beth managed to free Phillip and they found another exit. After getting Beth, who'd taken on the Lorelei personality to deal with her trauma, the help she needed, the pair reunited.

While Beth and Phillip reunited was a good idea in concept, the reality was more difficult. Phillip was cold and distant, confused by Beth's changes in personality while Beth was skittish and irritated by Phillip's pompous and patriarchal attitude in taking his son Zach away from Harley because of her relationship with Gus Aitoro. Frustrated by Beth, Phillip found himself susceptible to the charms of Olivia Spencer, Alan's fiancée. Then suddenly, a scandal rocked the household: Lorelei's diary was published! Though Beth immediately suspected Olivia, the publisher stated Lorelei had done the deed. Lizzie, Phillip, everyone, including Beth herself, blamed Beth. Confused, Beth went to Alan's lake cottage to clear her head, and ran into Bill Lewis. In an attempt to remember the past, she kissed him passionately. Phillip walked in at just that moment and railed out her. Later, Olivia told Phillip that it was Alan who published Lorelei's diary. To get revenge on Alan, the couple placed themselves on the bed, waiting for him to arrive. Once again they got carried away and began making out. Alan walked in, took one look at them, and had a heart attack. Later when Beth learned the circumstances of Alan's heart attack, she and Phillip agreed they had both changed far too much to be together, and gracefully parted ways.

Though now free, Phillip was too guilty over his father's heart attack and vowed to stay away from Olivia, who agreed to marry Alan as well as sign an extreme prenuptial agreement which said she would lose her half of the Beacon Hotel if she cheated before the wedding. But she and Phillip kissed in the elevator moments before the ceremony, and Alex pocketed the security tape. On Thanksgiving Day, Alexandra revealed Olivia had published Lorelei's Diary. Meanwhile, Alex eventually gave Olivia the security tape. Alan found the tape and saw Olivia and Phillip's smooch was right in front of his eyes. Alan threw her out of the house and into the cold, days before Christmas. Later, after finding out Alan faked his earlier heart attack, Phillip and Olivia saw no reason to deny their feelings now, they wildly made love. The couple's happiness didn't last long. Confused about whether to end her marriage, Olivia went out of town in early 2003 to visit her sister and clear her head. While away, she made her choice and sent Phillip a priority letter saying she wanted to be with him and for him to meet her at the Beacon. Alan intercepted the letter and kept it from Phillip. When Olivia arrived at the Beacon, Alan and not Phillip was there to greet her. Hurt and vulnerable, Olivia let herself be seduced by Alan only to have Phillip arrive at the Beacon the next morning and find the two together. Disgusted that she'd fall into Alan's arms so soon, Phillip walked away. When Olivia tried to explain the situation, Phillip revealed he never got the letter. Though the pair figured out Alan intercepted the letter, that didn't matter to Phillip who decided he'd be better off not chasing after his father's wife. However, when Olivia revealed to Phillip she was pregnant and the child might be his, Phillip agreed to stand by her no matter what. Meanwhile, Phillip swore off Spaulding but was pulled back into the company when Alex informed him Alan was acting erratically.

Faced with a mentally disturbed Alan, Phillip agreed to come back to the company. Not long after, an angry but well Alan was termed innocent of Reva's stalking and informed Phillip he was handing control of Spaulding over to his real son—Gus Aitoro! In addition to his troubles with Alan, Alex's schemes to break up Olivia and Phillip seemed to work after Alex paid someone to doctor the paternity test Phillip had secretly done without Olivia's knowledge which showed Alan was the father. However, Olivia had had her own tests done which proved otherwise. Olivia couldn't forgive Phillip's mistrust and asked him to stay away from her. Weeks later, Olivia would fall down the stairs at the Beacon. Although she and the baby were okay, she refused to see Phillip. Later, Phillip was shocked to learn she thought Lizzie was responsible for her fall. Incredulous, Phillip was dismayed to learn Beth and Lillian shared the fear and spirited the girl away to a cabin without his knowledge. In denial for months over Lizzie's emotional state, Phillip was later horrified when Lizzie threatened to kill herself after being confronted by Beth and Lillian. Though Harley was able to defuse the situation and bring Lizzie home, Phillip finally realized his daughter needed help. The situation with Lizzie brought Phillip to the breaking point and he began making plans for his soon-to-be-born daughter and suffering from panic attacks. Though an anxious Phillip tried to convince Olivia to marry him, she saw he was only asking because he wanted to provide a home for the child she was carrying, not because he loved her. Not long after she gave Phillip a non-answer to his marriage proposal, things finally came to a head with Lizzie. The night of Olivia's baby shower, Lizzie sneaked out of the house on the pretense of giving Olivia a gift. When a frightened Olivia refused the gift and asked Lizzie to leave, Lizzie continued to push the gift on Olivia and finally was escorted home by Christopher. That night, Olivia found something in her baby crib—a doll's head. Though Lizzie tried to deny it and pleaded with her family to believe her, she was unable to convince her family of her innocence.

A horrified Olivia decided she had to get as far away from Lizzie as possible and left Springfield. Convinced he was a horrible father because he couldn't help Lizzie, Phillip's mental state would only get worse. Though agreeing to check himself into Cedars in order to have tests done, Phillip discharged himself early after doctors said there was nothing physically wrong with him. However, those close to Phillip could tell there was something seriously wrong. Phillip finally lost his grip on reality, seeing visions of Olivia everywhere. Finally, Phillip began stalking a pregnant woman and broke into her home, thinking she was Olivia. After that incident, Phillip's family decided to arrange an intervention, the same as they had with Lizzie, in order to convince Phillip to get himself help. By now Phillip had grown increasingly paranoid and delusional, but when he realized that his deteriorating condition was scaring Lizzie, Phillip agreed to go to the hospital for tests. After seeing yet another vision of Olivia (though unbeknownst to him, this one was real), Phillip checked himself into Ravenwood Mental Hospital. By now the family knew Olivia was in town, and believing she could help Phillip, they persuaded her to visit him. Phillip's condition had worsened greatly and unsure of his own sanity, he tried to strangle Olivia, thinking she was an hallucination. Unnerved, days later Olivia returned and told Phillip why she'd come back—their baby had died. Instead of the truth snapping Phillip back into reality, it only made him draw deeper into himself, becoming almost catatonic, and to Olivia's horror Phillip started blaming himself.

As time went by, Phillip seemed trapped in his shell, unaware of what was going on around him. Then in January 2004, his condition seemed to improve somewhat. Although he remained silent, he started responding to people. Meanwhile, Olivia hurriedly got a minister to marry her and Phillip at the institution. Olivia's position as Phillip's wife secure, she set out to solidify her power base at Spaulding and more by having Phillip change his will. Meanwhile, she kept a firm hold on Phillip, limiting his visitors, and often answering questions posed to Phillip herself. Finally, weeks later, Phillip received a shock when Olivia showed Phillip their daughter, Emma, who hadn't died after all. Although Phillip agreed to Olivia's demand of telling no one of Emma's existence, in order to protect the child from Lizzie, in private a vengeful Phillip vowed to make Olivia pay and take the child from her. For Olivia, Phillip proved to be a loose cannon and revealed to others Emma was alive. Although Beth and Rick dismissed Phillip's claims as denial, Lizzie was very suspicious and eventually presented Emma to Phillip. Soon after, Phillip decided he had to take drastic measures to get his life back on track and, on Rick's recommendation, he underwent ECT therapy. Meanwhile, Phillip and Olivia started playing a dangerous game with each other, with Olivia playing the concerned, dutiful wife and with Phillip physically intimidating her. Finally after weeks of therapy, Phillip was released from the hospital and returned home where he and Olivia continued their cat and mouse game. Although Alan suggested Phillip simply get rid of Olivia, Phillip had something devious in mind for his wife. His plan was to frame her for the Antimonious drug scandal that Spaulding was being investigated for. Phillip's plan was foiled with the Feds dropped the investigation before they discovered the evidence. Not long after Phillip got his revenge on Olivia by blackmailing her with the knowledge she had illegally purchased Spaulding stock. With the choice between prison and staying married, Olivia was forced to bow down to Phillip's wishes. cold and calculating, Phillip to set out to embarrass Olivia and keep her under his thumb. In addition, he had Olivia trailed and cut off access to her bank accounts, in the event she'd try to leave. For his final act of revenge, he demanded Olivia resign from Spaulding, giving her a prepared speech on what to say. Finally, on the day of Harley's almost wedding to Gus, Phillip finally gave Olivia what she wanted—a divorce.

That was the only good thing that would happen that day. For on that day, Harley discovered not only was Alexandra an accomplice in the Antimonious drug deal, but Gus knew. In short order, Harley called the wedding off, Frank (framed for the crime) held a gun on Alan, and Buzz turned Alex in to the police. Seeing a grave injustice to his family, Phillip went after the Coopers, specifically Company. Deciding to rebuild the city of Springfield, Phillip, in a cold and calculating manner worthy of Alan, went through the government and secured permission to go forth with his plans. When Harley and Buzz learned who was behind the takeover of Company, they were furious. However, Phillip remained cold and unapologetic stating it was just business and offered to compensate Buzz fairly. But Buzz refused to give up and decided to fight. Phillip refused to make it easy on the Coopers, visiting Company at every turn and basically rubbing salt in the wound. However, the Coopers weren't the only family Phillip was after. In order to create his own version of Springfield, Phillip needed to acquire more property and made it appear as if he wanted to take over Cross Creek in order to distract them from their other properties. Meanwhile, very soon after, Phillip overheard Bill pleading with one of his employees, to reconsider resigning. Impressed with this middle-aged woman, named Ruth Karloff, Phillip interviewed her and found her to be no-nonsense, efficient and loyal and he hired her as his personal assistant. As the days went by, Phillip was growing more and more callous with each passing day. When he learned Lizzie had drugged her boyfriend, Joey Lupo, he inexplicably took Lizzie's side and blackmailed Joey into leaving town by threatening to foreclose on Mrs. Lupo's house. Days later, Phillip was enraged when his plans for Company were foiled when it was discovered the area was a nesting place for a rare bird. Angry that he'd lost, Phillip vindictively tore down Harley's house. Phillip's malice towards the Coopers wasn't lost on Zach, who distanced himself from Phillip. Although the Coopers denied it, Phillip was certain they were poisoning Zach's mind against him. In the meantime, Lizzie was having her own problems and confessed to Phillip she believed she'd hit Sandy Foster with her car. Desperate to protect his daughter, Phillip urged her to keep quiet while he took care of everything. Meanwhile, Phillip was becoming paranoid that someone at Spaulding was working against him and asked Gus to run a background check on all key employees. In the meantime, Gus was becoming concerned the mole was actually Ruth, Phillip's now trusted assistant. Phillip expressed his doubts.

When Ruth began asking questions about the hit and run, he quickly realized Gus was right and decided Ruth needed to be neutralized to protect Lizzie. To accomplish this, he arranged for a man to run Ruth down! His plan failed however, when Gus ended up saving her life. In the midst of all this, Phillip's diabolical behavior concerned everyone, including those closest to him. In an effort to get through to Phillip, Rick arranged for Phillip to be kidnapped so they could talk. Although Rick tried reasoning, he only succeeded in making Phillip angry. That same day, Phillip learned something startling from Zach—Ruth was Harley in disguise! Still dealing with that revelation, Phillip was shocked to learn Lizzie was at the police station, about to confess to the hit and run! Although he tried to demand she keep quiet, Lizzie openly defied her father and admitted the truth. Believing everyone was against him, Phillip decided to leave Springfield with the only people he cared about—his children. After luring all the children to his private jet, Phillip informed everyone he had the children. Harley attempted to appeal to the human side of him, but to no avail. Not long after, Phillip arranged for Lizzie to be brought to him, however when she refused to go with him, he became enraged and vowed to destroy the people who have cost him his daughter's love. That same night, he asked several people to meet him at Company at 9 pm, telling each person if they came, and told no one else of the meeting, their children would be returned to them. At 9 pm, various citizens of Springfield converged at Company to find Phillip shot. Although he was rushed to the hospital, it was too late and Phillip was declared dead.

After a short investigation, Harley was arrested, and the spring of 2005, convicted of Phillip's murder. Months after her conviction, Phillip's real shooter was revealed—it was Alan. However, that wasn't the end of the story. Having been revealed to be Phillip's killer, Alan knew he had to leave town and paid a visit to an abandoned warehouse where he met with none other than Phillip. Apparently Alan's concerns about Phillip's state of mind caused him to take drastic action in order to protect his son and his grandchildren: he shot Phillip and faked his death. Unknown to everyone else in Springfield, a completely delusional Phillip was living out his life as CEO of Spaulding in an abandoned warehouse office made to look like his Spaulding office. When Alan was arrested no one believed his story about Philip being alive. Not only that, but the medical staff stopped looking after Phillip because Alan couldn't pay. Phillip disappeared and later called Rick, stating he needed his help. Despite Rick's reluctance, Phillip pleaded with his friend to keep his situation a secret. Phillip was almost discovered by Mallet the day Harley married Gus but managed to escape. Meanwhile, frantic that a mentally disturbed Phillip was a danger to himself as well as to others, Alan went to desperate lengths to lure him into the open. To draw Phillip out, Alan married none other than Beth.

In the Spring of 2006, Phillip's Uncle Ross was apparently killed when his plane went down on the way to San Gabriel. After some investigating, Harley learned Alan was telling the truth—Phillip was alive. Rick confirmed it and admitted Ross suspected the truth and set out to find him. Determined not to be found, Phillip asked Rick to have the plane sabotaged so Ross couldn't take off. Tragically, the plane went up anyway and Ross was killed. In late 2007, the specter of Phillip continued to loom over Springfield. It started at Emma's seventh birthday party where she received a gift apparently from her father. Panicked, Olivia went to Alan for protection, unaware it was Alan who sent the gift as a way to manipulate Olivia into helping him. When Olivia tried to bow out, Alan upped the ante by hiring someone to break into her room and trash it. Not long after, Alan unexpectedly hired Harley to find Phillip. Though distressed at the thought of him returning, Harley decided it might be best to know his whereabouts and took the case. It didn't take long to learn Beth had received a gift from Phillip for her unborn baby. However, it came from a courier and she had no clue where Phillip was. At one point, Phillip sent Harley a card telling her to stop looking for him; she'll see him when he is ready. Afterwards, Harley spotted Zach's new sneakers and the boy was forced to admit they came from Phillip. Told Phillip would be at his ballgame, Harley and her partner Cyrus Foley waited and Cyrus tackled a hooded man they thought was Phillip. It was Remy who claimed to have run into Phillip after losing some gambling money in Clayton. Remy claimed Phillip paid him to deliver this package (which contained Phillip's old high school sports jersey) to Zach. Remy told the duo he didn't know where Phillip was, but doubted he was returning to town.

Sometime later, Bill Lewis became involved with Lizzie, and was falsely accused of being responsible for Lizzie's kidnapping (orchestrated by Dinah Marler and executed by Grady Foley). Despite her insistence that she believed Bill was not responsible for her kidnapping, Lizzie's faith in Bill began to wain and she slowly turned into Alan's pawn, distancing herself from Bill. In an effort to make Lizzie see reason, Bill (along with his father, Billy), set out to find Phillip in an effort to get him to help her. Bill was unsuccessful in his search, but things would work out in a way he never expected.

On February 9, 2009, in an effort to prevent Beth from marrying Alan, Coop Bradshaw was involved in a car accident on his way to the church. Badly injured, Coop was pulled from the wreckage by Phillip. In the following episode, Phillip spoke with Alan alone, at Phillip's mock grave site. He then pulled a gun on Alan, but told him he had no intention of shooting him. He even thanked Alan for straightening him out during his time of mental illness. Later that day, he stopped an enraged Buzz Cooper from physically attacking Alan.

Phillip's return jolted the entire Spaulding family, and they barely had time to adjust when Beth's and Phillip's 19-year-old son, James, returned from boarding school. James was running a Ponzi scheme and even when Phillip helped clear the charges against him, he resented Phillip's return. Beth was torn between the love of her life and the son who had only known the worst of his father. During this time Beth also helped her daughter Lizzie marry Bill Lewis.

Eventually, Phillip learned he was dying. He didn't tell anyone, aside from Lillian, and tried to repair the relationships in his life with the time he had left. Beth found out in what were supposed to be Phillip's last days, and she felt devastated as well as betrayed by Phillip and by her mother. Fortunately for Phillip, Alan agreed to a bone marrow transplant, and saved his son's life, but a few days later, Alan quietly died after attending the double wedding of Lillian and Buzz Cooper and Vanessa Chamberlain and Billy Lewis. Beth was forced to break the news to her young daughter Peyton. Shortly before Alan's death, Phillip had proposed to Beth, and she had happily accepted. James and Phillip were now reconciled and Lizzie was trying for a baby. Beth also decided to return to her first love, drawing. A year later, Beth and Phillip were happily married, and were celebrating the upcoming nuptials of their best friends Rick and Mindy.

== Notable relationships ==
Phillip is known for having many wives.

=== Mindy Lewis ===
Phillip's first wife was Mindy Lewis, daughter of Billy Lewis and his deceased first wife Diana. Mindy originally was the lover of Rick Bauer and Phillip was engaged to Beth Raines. However, after Phillip and Mindy had a one-night stand (because they thought Rick and Beth slept together), Mindy became pregnant. Phillip decided to do the right thing by marrying Mindy in 1984. Not long after, Mindy suffered a miscarriage and the marriage crumbled. Phillip maintained his feelings for Beth, while Mindy still longed for Rick. Within six months, the couple opted for an amicable divorce in 1985.

=== India von Halkein ===
India, Alexandra's stepdaughter from her marriage to the Baron Leo von Halkein, arrived in town in 1984. India's homeland was Andorra, where she and her father lived. Phillip became smitten with the worldly India. Soon after arriving in Springfield, India began a vendetta against the Spaulding family. She blackmailed Phillip into marriage in 1984, and became a member of the board of directors at Spaulding Enterprises. Phillip and India's wedding is regarded as one of the most memorable nuptials in soap opera history. After India's affair with Simon Hall, she and Phillip divorced in early 1986. India remained on the Spaulding Enterprises board of directors indefinitely. Later, India helped Phillip fake his death and go on the run to discover who killed Neil Everest.

=== Christina "Blake" Thorpe ===
Phillip believed Beth to be dead, so he moved on with the scheming Blake Thorpe. They married in mid 1989. Blake and Phillip's marriage immediately began to crumble when it appeared that Beth was in fact alive. Thereafter, Beth and Phillip consummated their relationship. Phillip divorced Blake later that year, and Blake sought revenge by romantically pursuing his brother, Alan-Michael Spaulding.

=== Elizabeth "Beth" Raines ===
Phillip married the love of his life, Beth Raines in 1991. Phillip's wedding to Beth is also considered to be memorable, in that it featured one of the show's most popular couples to finally say their "I do's." The couple's first dance as man and wife was to Lionel Richie's 1982 debut solo "Truly," which is also remembered as the song Phillip and Beth danced to at their high school prom where they were named king and queen. In later years, Beth had already given birth to a healthy baby girl named Lizzie Spaulding and together she and Phillip left Springfield. They were happy offscreen for quite a while and Phillip returned to Springfield in 1994 to find out who framed him for a number of criminal acts. Phillip moved on with Harley Cooper, but Beth returned. She and Phillip tried to reconnect, but eventually the marriage failed because of the time apart. They separated in 1995. Beth continued to try to separate Phillip from his attachment to Harley, but their divorce was finalized in 1997 after Beth coaxed Lizzie into trying to interfere with Phillip's newfound happiness. At the end of the series Phillip and Beth found happiness.

=== Harley Cooper ===
Phillip married Harley in a surprise family ceremony officiated by the mayor of New York, Rudy Gulliani, in 1997. The wedding was organized by Phillip's Best Friend, Rick; Harley's stepmother, Jenna and Phillip's Aunt Alexandra. In a surprise moment, Phillip asked Alan to be his best man. Harley gave birth to their son, Alan Cooper "Zach" Spaulding. The marriage had its share of ups and downs; and ultimately, the couple divorced in 2001 after Phillip had lied about his unborn child resulting from an affair with Beth.

=== Olivia Spencer ===
Olivia Spencer was married to Phillip's father Alan, but after an affair and a pregnancy, Alan kidnapped Olivia and held her away on an island. Phillip rescued her and ultimately, with the use of blackmail, Alan gave Olivia a divorce in 2003. Olivia and Phillip continued to court each other until they ultimately married in 2004 when she gave birth to Emma Spaulding. Eventually, thanks to Harley, Buzz Cooper, and Frank Cooper, Phillip developed a vendetta against the Cooper family and literally went insane. After having him committed, Olivia divorced him and ran away with her daughter Emma.

== Reception ==
Grant Aleksander has been nominated for a Daytime Emmy Award four times throughout his tenure on the show. In 1998, he was nominated for Outstanding Supporting Actor and in 2003, 2004 and 2005, Aleksander was nominated for Outstanding Lead Actor.
