= Ashlee Wolfe =

- Guiding Light character
- Portrayed by: Caitlin Van Zandt
- Duration: 2006–2009
- First appearance: April 25, 2006
- Last appearance: September 18, 2009
- Created by: David Kreizman and Donna Swajeski
- Introduced by: Ellen Wheeler
In-universe information
- Occupation: Student at UC Berkeley; Broadcast Intern
- Mother: Doris Wolfe
- Stepfather: Alan Spaulding (2007)
- Uncles: Bob Wolfe

Ashlee Wolfe is a fictional character on CBS's daytime drama Guiding Light. She was portrayed by Caitlin Van Zandt from April 25, 2006 to the show's ending in September 2009. The character was subjected to various pressures due to her being overweight and attempted to rise above the ridicule by dating Henry Cooper Bradshaw and change her life. Van Zandt's decision to have the lap-band surgery influenced her character's storyline when Ashlee received it as well. The storyline received much press attention as Van Zandt became a supporter and image of healthy living and eating habits.
