= Frank Dicopoulos =

American actor

- Born: Frank Dickos; January 3, 1957 (age 69); Akron, Ohio
- Occupation: Actor
- Years active: 1985–present

Frank Dicopoulos (born January 3, 1957) is an American actor. He is the oldest of three children. Dicopoulos played the role of Frank Achilles Cooper Jr. on Guiding Light, a character he played from 1987 until the show's final episode on September 18, 2009.

== Biography ==
Born in Akron, Ohio to Catherine and Harry Dicopoulos, Frank Dicopoulos majored in psychology and minored in art and drama at Kenyon College in Gambier, Ohio. He was active in football, basketball, and lacrosse, and he also set a National Collegiate Athletic Association Division III track record in high hurdles. At first he thought of becoming an orthopedic surgeon specializing in sports medicine. But then he enrolled in drama courses – and became hooked.

Following college graduation, he moved to Texas. After managing a tire store in Houston and working as an auto mechanic, he began posing for print photography ads and doing television commercials. In a nationwide talent search in Dallas, he became one of four finalists out of 770 candidates to screen-test for the Larry Wilcox replacement role on the television series CHiPs. Although he did not get the job, he did get a small film part and had the lead in an MTV video documentary called Wild Rides, narrated by Matt Dillon. He also hosted On the Move for ESPN and the Miss Teen America Pageant in Dallas.

In 1984, Dicopoulos moved to Los Angeles where he appeared in numerous primetime series, including The Tracey Ullman Show, Silver Spoons, Hotel, Dynasty, and Falcon Crest, as well as the soap operas The Young and the Restless, Capitol, and, General Hospital. He also acted in feature films before joining Guiding Light.

In 2010, Dicopoulos joined the cast of River Ridge: The Series as Isaac Rylan. The new series is about the smothering foundations of a small town and a group of its inhabitants.

== Family ==
Dicopoulos has been married to Teja Anderson since October 20, 1990, and they have two children, Jaden and Olivia. Olivia Dicopoulos played teenaged "Maureen Reardon" on Guiding Light for several years in the 2000s. He has been a resident of Marlboro Township, New Jersey.
