= Doris Wolfe =

- Guiding Light character
- Portrayed by: Orlagh Cassidy
- Duration: 1999–2009
- First appearance: February 23, 1999
- Last appearance: September 18, 2009
- Created by: James Harmon Brown and Barbara Esensten
- Introduced by: Paul Rauch
In-universe information
- Other names: Doris Spaulding
- Occupation: Mayor; District Attorney; Lawyer
- Brothers: Bob Wolfe
- Spouse: Alan Spaulding (2007)
- Children: Ashlee Wolfe

Doris Wolfe is a fictional character on CBS's daytime drama Guiding Light. She has been portrayed by Orlagh Cassidy from February 23, 1999 to September 18, 2009. Doris is perceived as a no-nonsense politician who will do just about anything to get ahead in life, often referred to as a "woman people love to hate."

== Character information ==
Doris Wolfe pulled herself up from relative poverty with little more than her own burning ambition. Raising her daughter, Ashlee, alone in a trailer park, she fought her way up the ladder to become one of Springfield's most successful lawyers. When she landed work in the District Attorney's office, she first came to prominence for her harsh and unrelenting prosecution style. She threatened Vanessa while she aided Dinah after Hart's shooting and went after Annie Dutton with a strong case that was defused when prime witness Reva Shayne refused to cooperate at the last minute. She later went after Reva herself for disconnecting Richard Winslow's life support and got her sentenced to two years (it was later dropped). Her years of work fell by the wayside however when the mayor appointed the virtually unknown Jeffrey O'Neill to the office of district attorney.

Unforgiving, Doris began a vendetta against Reva and her family. She went after Jonathan and Tammy for arson, but relented on putting Tammy away when Jeffrey offered her his job to let her off. The case against Jonathan fell apart when Sandy Foster confessed to setting the fire. Undeterred, she took the next opportunity, and Ashlee's drunken adventures with Jonathan, to go after him again. Jonathan continued to taunt her by spending time with Ashlee, but Alan dissuaded her from pursuing this. He began flirting with her and used her to try to get Lizzie's baby away from her even before it was born. Finding what she had long wanted in Alan, she used the evidence she had of his involvement in Tammy's death as a brokering tool to get him to marry her. Although Beth tried to fight to keep her husband, Doris threatened both Alan and Lizzie and Beth was forced out. Soon, Doris and Alan were wed in January 2007 but he was mysteriously shot in the elevator during the ceremony. With her new husband in a coma, Doris sought to evict his former wife and her family from the mansion while moving in with Ashlee but the marriage was eventually annulled.

Doris became heavily featured in the notable Otalia storyline after Emma Spaulding presented a school project, "My Two Mommies." Doris blasted Emma's mother Olivia Spencer and her friend Natalia Rivera Aitoro about how bad of an influence they were on Emma and the community. After Olivia was struggling with her newfound romantic feelings for Natalia, on March 11, 2009, Doris ran into her at ladies night at a local bar. Doris revealed that she is a lesbian but that no one knows because no one would have elected a gay mayor. She also reveals that Ashlee doesn't know. In September 2009, Doris was forced to tell Ashlee about her sexuality. Ashlee was upset that her mother kept this lifelong secret.
