= Ron Raines =

American actor (born 1949)

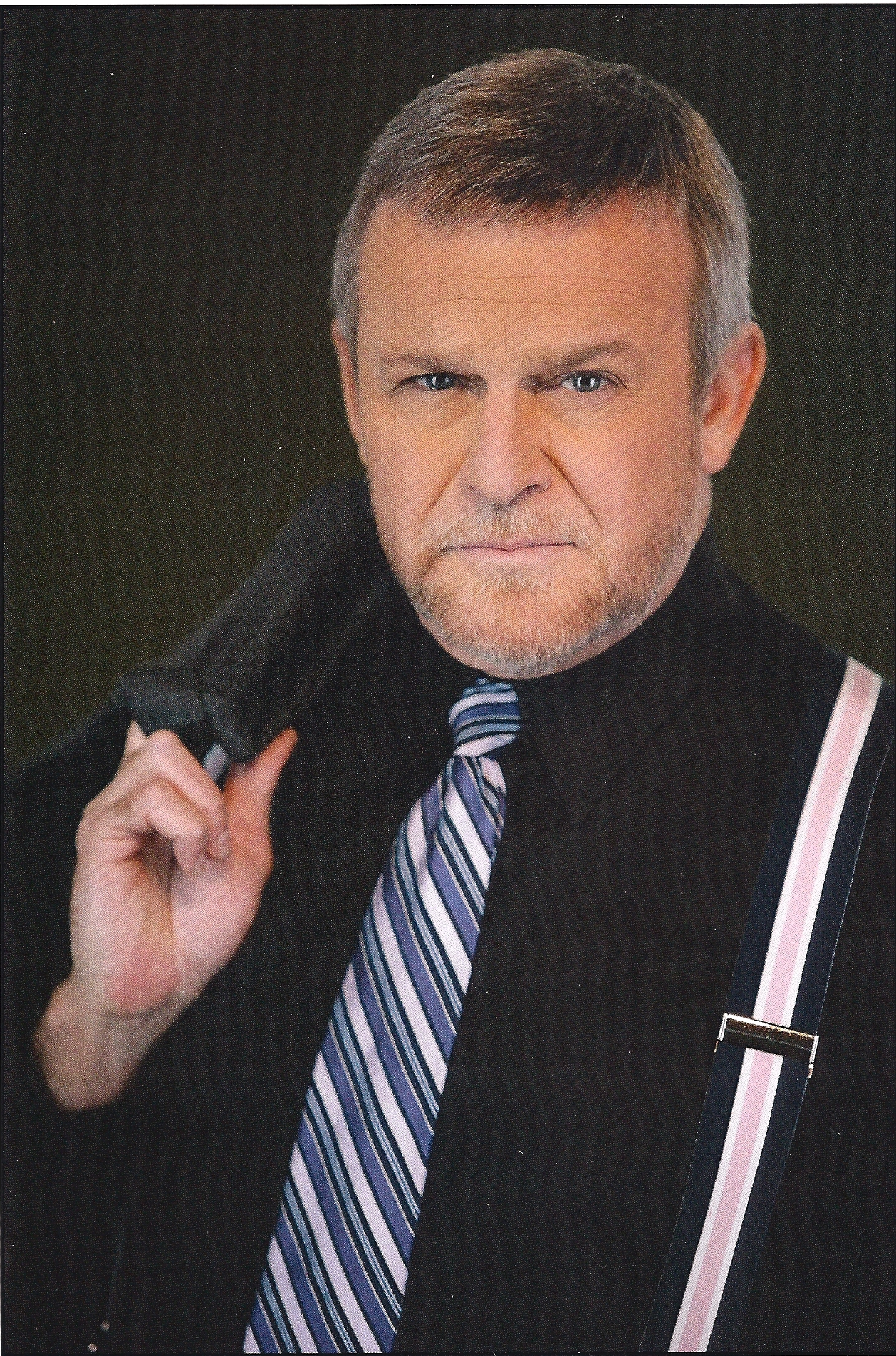
- Born: December 2, 1949 (age 76); Texas City, Texas, U.S.
- Occupations: Actor, singer
- Spouse: Dona D. Vaughn
- Children: 1

Ron Raines (born December 2, 1949) is an American actor and singer. He is known for the role of Alan Spaulding on the television soap opera Guiding Light. Raines also performs in musical theatre and in concert with symphony orchestras.

== Career ==
=== Early years ===
Raines was born in Texas City, Texas. His father was a Church of the Nazarene minister, and Raines became interested in music through the church. He was once in a band called Renaissance. He graduated from Nacogdoches High School in Nacogdoches, Texas, graduated from Oklahoma City University and later attended Juilliard. He decided to pursue a career in performing after he finished Juilliard. Oklahoma City University, where he received his undergraduate degree, awarded him an honorary Doctor of Musical Arts degree in 2021.

=== Television ===
Raines joined Guiding Light in 1994 in his first television role. He is the third actor to play the part of the sinister, nefarious Alan Spaulding, a role which has earned him three Emmy nominations. He remained on Guiding Light through its cancellation in 2009. In 2013 he appeared in an episode of the CBS drama Person of Interest as Bruce Wellington. In 2014 he made a guest appearance on the CBS drama Elementary as Ian. In 2020, Raines joined the cast of The Blacklist portraying Dominic Wilkinson, replacing Brian Dennehy after the latter's death.

=== Web series ===
In 2013, Raines joined the online reboot of One Life to Live as Carl Peterson

In 2014, Raines played Senator William Preston in the soap opera web series Beacon Hill.

=== Operas/Operettas ===
He made his debut at New York City Opera as "Danilo" in The Merry Widow. Subsequently, he has appeared in Naughty Marietta, Rose-Marie, The Gypsy Princess, The Desert Song, The New Moon and Die Fledermaus.

=== Musical theatre ===
Raines appeared on Broadway in the 1983 Broadway revival of Show Boat (as "Ravenal"); the 1987 Broadway production of Teddy & Alice and as "Billy Flynn" in the long-running revival of Chicago in 2002.

He has also appeared in productions of South Pacific, Annie, Kiss Me, Kate, Can-Can, The King and I, Brigadoon, Oklahoma!, Carousel, The Pajama Game, Guys and Dolls, A Little Night Music, Kismet and Man of La Mancha. He played the role of Johnny Brown in the Debbie Reynolds US tour of The Unsinkable Molly Brown in 1990.

In 1994, he was offered a part in the national touring production of The Sound of Music with Marie Osmond on the same day he was offered the role of Alan Spaulding on Guiding Light. He decided to take the TV role.

He appeared in the Kennedy Center production of Follies from May 7, 2011, through June 19, 2011, as Ben Stone, with Bernadette Peters, Jan Maxwell, Danny Burstein and Elaine Paige. He had played this role previously in the 1988 Michigan Opera production (with Juliet Prowse and Nancy Dussault). He reprised his role in the Broadway engagement at the Marquis Theatre from August 7, 2011 (in previews) through January 22, 2012. Raines continued with this production in the Ahmanson Theatre, Los Angeles, California engagement, from May 3, 2012, through June 9, 2012. Raines received a Tony Award nomination for Best Leading Actor in a Musical for this role.

He appeared in the Broadway musical Newsies as Joseph Pulitzer from October 9, 2012, through December 16, 2012, as a temporary replacement for John Dossett. He also appeared in the Broadway revival of Annie as Daddy Warbucks from December 10, 2013, until it closed on January 5, 2014, as a replacement for Anthony Warlow.

=== Concerts and recordings ===
As a concert performer, Raines has appeared as soloist with the symphony orchestras in Atlanta, Baltimore, Cleveland, Columbus, Utah, Dallas, Minnesota, Omaha, Pittsburgh (with Marvin Hamlisch), Philadelphia Pops (with Peter Nero), San Diego, San Francisco, Tulsa and Washington, D.C.. He also appeared with the Boston Pops (with John Williams and Keith Lockhart).

He has performed with BBC Concert Orchestra in London, the Royal Philharmonic, the Jerusalem Symphony and the Israeli Philharmonic.

Raines has appeared in several PBS Great Performances specials and has recorded two solo albums: So In Love With Broadway (2004) and Broadway Passion, along with several musicals including Man of La Mancha and Pajama Game on the Jay Records album label.

== Personal life ==
Raines and his wife Dona D. Vaughn have a daughter, Charlotte. He is a cousin to American self-help author Jaclyn Johnston.
