= Caitlin Van Zandt =

American actor (born 1985)

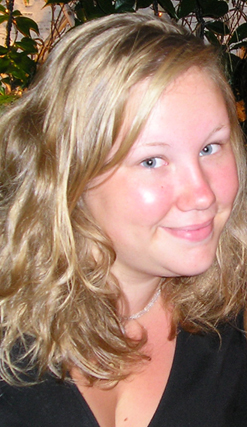
- Van Zandt in 2004
- Born: July 17, 1985 (age 41); New York City, New York, U.S.
- Other name: Caitlin VanZandt
- Occupation: Actor

Caitlin Van Zandt (born July 17, 1985, in New York City) is an American actor. She is best known for her role on Guiding Light as Ashlee Wolfe, and as Allegra Marie Sacrimoni on the HBO series, The Sopranos.

== Career ==
Van Zandt got her first film role debut in 2003 in the movie Camp as Ilana. Then in 2006, she won the role of Allegra Marie Sacrimoni on the hit HBO series, The Sopranos.

She has also appeared on Hope & Faith and Queens Supreme.

== Personal life ==
Van Zandt underwent lap band surgery in 2008; she lost 90 pounds (41 kg) in the year following surgery. Despite appearing on the same show (The Sopranos), she is not related to Steven Van Zandt.

== Filmography ==
=== Film ===
| Year | Title | Role | Notes |
|---|---|---|---|
| 2003 | Camp | Ilana | |
| 2005 | Stephanie Daley | Satin | |
| 2007 | Gardener of Eden | Sarah | |

=== Television ===
| Year | Title | Role | Notes |
|---|---|---|---|
| 2003 | Queens Supreme | Chelsea | Episode: "The Eyes Have It" |
| 2005 | Hope & Faith | Kathy Johnson | Episode: "21 Lunch Street" |
| 2006–2007 | The Sopranos | Allegra Sacrimoni | 3 episodes |
| 2006–2009 | Guiding Light | Ashlee Wolfe | 223 episodes |
