= Nancy St. Alban =

American actress

Nancy St. Alban is an American actress.

Born as Nancy Worrell Franklin, she grew up in Baltimore as one of eight siblings. A ballet dancer since the age of seven, St. Alban attended the Baltimore Actors' Theatre Conservatory, a small private high school for the arts. She later graduated from Syracuse University with a BFA in musical theatre.

Prior to joining the cast of Guiding Light in October 2000 in the role of Michelle Bauer Santos, St. Alban appeared in over 50 commercials, as well as in the CBS Hallmark Hall of Fame television movie, Durango (1999). She also recently appeared in the independent feature, Some Fish Could Fly, (1999). Her theater credits include Chicago, Kiss Me, Kate, Crimes of the Heart and Verona Wall.

St. Alban and her husband, photographer Chris Puleo have been married since November 14, 1998; they have two daughters, Francesca and Luciana, and a son James.
