= Elizabeth Keifer =

American actress (born 1961)

- Born: November 14, 1961 (age 64); Pacific Palisades, California, U.S.
- Occupation: Actress
- Years active: 1981 – present
- Spouse(s): Brett Porter (m. 1986; div. 1988) Robert Convertino (m. 1996)
- Children: 2

Elizabeth Keifer (born November 14, 1961) is an American actress.

== Biography ==
Keifer was born in Pacific Palisades, California. She played the role of Christina "Blake" Marler on Guiding Light from August 1992 until the program ended in September 2009. In addition to her portrayal of Blake, Keifer has also appeared on other soaps, including, The Young and the Restless, One Life to Live, Days of Our Lives, and General Hospital.

== Personal life ==
Married to Robert Convertino since 1996, Keifer is the mother of two children: a daughter, Isabella (born on April 28, 1998) and a son, Keifer (born on January 8, 2000).

== Filmography ==
List of roles in film and television
Year	Title	Role	Notes
1981	Lou Grant	Wendy	Episode: "Violence"
1981	The Other Victim	Neighbor	TV film
1981	Happy Days	Noreen	Episode: "Fonzie the Substitute"
1982	The Devlin Connection	Daughter	Episode: "Ring of Kings, Ring of Thieves"
1982–1983	The Young and the Restless	Angela Lawrence	TV series
1983	Thursday's Child	Tina	TV film
1984–1985	One Life to Live	Connie O'Neill	TV series
1985	Cheers	Lisa	Episode: "Woody Goes Belly Up"
1985	Days of Our Lives	Amy Cooper	TV series
1986	The Facts of Life	Belinda	Episode: "The Reunion"
1986	Dallas: The Early Years	Cherie	TV film
1986	General Hospital	Sister Mary Camellia McKay	TV series
1987	Full House	Corrina Spicer	Episode: "Jesse's Girl"
1987	21 Jump Street	Debbie Eaton	Episode: "Fear and Loathing with Russell Buckins"
1988	The Highwayman	Leslie	Episode: "Summer of '45"
1989	My Two Dads	Jenny	Episode: "The God of Love"
1989	Rising Storm	Blaise Hart	Theatrical film
1989	Charles in Charge	Julie Mercer	Episode: "A Sting of Pearls"
1989	Mick and Frankie	Diane	TV film
1989	Married... with Children	Ginger	Episode: "He Ain't Much, But He's Mine"
1990	The Adventures of Superboy	Loretta / Yellow Peri	Episode: "Yellow Peri's Spell of Doom"
1990	Freddy's Nightmares	Kim Lewis / Tania	Episode: "Interior Loft"
1990	Valerie	Jennifer Swift	2 episodes
1991	They Came from Outer Space	Paula	Episode: "Animal Magnetism"
1991	Adam-12	Robin	Episode: "Eye of the Beholder"
1992	Ladykiller	Carol Longfellow	TV film
1992–2009	Guiding Light	Blake Marler	TV series
2005	Law & Order: Criminal Intent	Marie Adair	Episode: "My Good Name"
2007	Law & Order: Special Victims Unit	Mrs. Mills	Episode: "Impulsive"
2008	The Clique	Judy Lyons	Direct-to-video film
2010	Morning Glory	Jerry's Wife	Theatrical film
2010–2012	Venice the Series	Amber	TV series
2012	Built for Two	Doris	Short film
2013	John	Dr. Fischer	Short film
2016	Ookie Cookie	June	Short film
2021	Bea, Seriously	Mom	Short film
2021	Blue Bloods	Iris Williams	Episode: “Firewall”
2024	Trivia at St. Nick's	Sherry	TV film

== Video games ==
List of voice performances in video games
Year	Title	Role	Notes
2018	Red Dead Redemption 2	Miss Marjorie	

== Bibliography ==
- CBS Daytime Bio
