= Allen M. Potter =

American screenwriter

- Born: September 5, 1919; Plainfield, New Jersey
- Died: June 5, 1995 (aged 75); Stuart, Florida
- Occupation: Television producer

Allen M. Potter (September 5, 1919 – June 5, 1995) was an American television soap opera producer. His longest tenure as executive producer for daytime series was for The Doctors and Guiding Light. He was GL's head writer during the 1981 Writers Guild of America strike.

== Early life and education ==
Potter was born in Plainfield, New Jersey. He graduated from Rutgers University. He served in the United States Army in World War II.

== Career ==
Potter served as the first producer on Another World in 1964. He produced several other shows, including The Aldrich Family, As the World Turns, The Brighter Day, The Doctors, Guiding Light, How to Survive a Marriage,, Our Private World, Schlitz Playhouse of Stars, and We the People.

== Accolades ==
Daytime Emmy Award

- Win, 1980, 1982, Drama Series, Guiding Light

Primetime Emmy Award

- Nomination, 1973, Drama Series, The Doctors
- Win, 1972, Drama Series, The Doctors
