= David Cherrill =

American television actor (born 1941)

David Cherrill (born Christopher David Colson; December 23, 1941) is an American television actor, writer and director.

== Credits ==
- Days of Our Lives (2008–2017)
- One Life to Live (hired by Michael Malone; 1995–1997, 2001–2004)
- Another World (hired by Dorothy Ann Purser; 1984–1989)
- As the World Turns (Actor: Tom Hughes 1973–78) (1998–1999)
- Search for Tomorrow (1983)
- The Doctors (1977–1982)
- Shipman
- The Last Minute
- Far from the Madding Crowd
- A Touch of Frost
- Shadowchaser
- Soldier Soldier
- The Bill
- Adderly
- Boon
- A Woman of Substance
- Space Riders
- On the Third Day
- Minder
- The Professionals
- A Passage to India
- Eureka
- Dunkirk
- How to Be a Little Sod

== Awards and nominations ==
He's been nominated for 6 Daytime Emmy Awards (1985, 1989, 1994–1996 and 2002); winning in 1994, and a Writers Guild of America Award. His first nomination was shared with Gary Tomlin, Samuel D. Ratcliffe, Judith Donato, Richard Culliton, Judith Pinsker, Frances Myers, Roger Newman, Carolyn Culliton, David Colson, Lloyd Gold, and Cynthia Saltzman.
