= Jake McKinnon =

- Another World character
- Portrayed by: Tom Eplin
- Duration: 1985–86; 1988–2002
- First appearance: February 4, 1985
- Last appearance: July 8, 2002
- Created by: Gary Tomlin
- Introduced by: Stephen Schenkel (1985); Michael Laibson (1988); Christopher Goutman (1999)
- Crossover appearances: As the World Turns
In-universe information
- Occupation: Editor of City Times; Owner and Publisher of Bay City's "The Herald"; Owner of McKinnon Publishing; CEO of Cory Publishing; Video director at KBAY-TV; Directed videos for D&M Productions; Ran a video-production company "Visions"; Bartender at Cafe Paradise; Bartender at Mary's Place
- Parents: Tim/Ray McKinnon; Helen/Alice McKinnon (Note: In 1985, Jake's parents were Tim & Helen McKinnon however, in 1992, their names were changed to Ray & Alice without explanation.)
- Siblings: Kevin Anderson
- Wife: Marley Love (1986–89); Paulina Cory (1991–92, 1994–96); Vicky Hudson (1997–99); Molly Conlan (2001–02)
- Children: Bridget McKinnon; Michelle McKinnon
- Stepchildren: Abigail Williams
- Uncles: Vince McKinnon
- Nephews: Sean McKinnon
- First cousins: Kathleen McKinnon; Cheryl McKinnon; Ben McKinnon; M.J. McKinnon

Jake McKinnon is a fictional character, portrayed by Tom Eplin throughout its entirety. Debuting on NBC's daytime drama, Another World, after its cancellation, the character crossed over to the CBS daytime drama, As the World Turns.

== Character history ==
=== Another World ===
Jake grew up in Lassiter, Pennsylvania, with his parents, Ray and Alice McKinnon. Ray died when Jake was a teen, and his mother took off not long afterwards. If it hadn't been for Bridget Connell and her charge Vicky Hudson, his childhood best friend and sometimes lover, Jake probably would have just struck out on his own.

Jake and Vicky came to Bay City to con her biological family, the Loves, out of a fortune. The plan was for him to pretend to fall in love with Vicky's identical twin sister, Marley, but he ruined their plan when he REALLY fell in love with her. Marley was the first love of his life, and the two wed as teenagers, leaving town shortly after.

Marley returned to town alone, because Jake was cheating on her. Jake followed her and hoped for a reconciliation, but Marley was not interested. Proving old habits die hard, Jake and Vicky slept together in a moment of weakness. Vicky became pregnant and told everyone the baby was Jamie Frame's. Jake helped Vicky deliver her son Steven Michael Frame and was named his godfather. Vicky was forced to confess to Jamie that Jake might be Steven's father, but she lied and said that Jake had raped her. In a rage, Jamie attacked Jake who told him Vicky was lying. Jake decided he had enough of Vicky and wanted full custody of Steven if he turned out to be his father. Jake and Marley got back together and formed a united front, which enraged Vicky. Despite having the same blood type as Jake, Steven turned out to be Jamie's son after all. The damage to both marriages proved to be too great, Marley and Jake divorced as did Vicky and Jamie.

Jake spent the next year scheming his way through Bay City. He slept with Vicky and Marley's mother, Donna, who was married to their father Michael. Donna later lost custody of her adopted son Mikey because she was blackmailed by Stacey Winthrop over their one-night-stand. He began working with Iris Wheeler to prove that Paulina Cantrell was not really Mac Cory's daughter. He thought he had uncovered the proof he needed, and began blackmailing Paulina, while also sleeping with her. Jake also blackmailed Iris that he would tell her family about her schemes against Paulina. He also reunited with Marley and the two became engaged again. When Marley learned that he was two-timing her with Paulina, she confronted him and ended their engagement. Unable to accept that he was losing the woman he loved, Jake viciously raped Marley. Marley told Vicky that Jake had only tried to rape her, but that was enough for Vicky to want revenge. He was shot later that night, but survived. Marley, Vicky, Iris, Paulina, and Donna were all in the frame for the crime. Marley stood trial for Jake's attempted murder, but was let off when Donna confessed (though she did not shoot him either and was only protecting her daughter).

It turned out it was really Paulina who had shot him. Rather than turn her in, Jake blackmailed Paulina into marrying him so he could get his hands on the Cory fortune. Jake still refused to let go of Marley, who was now with Jamie. Marley wanted nothing to do with Jake, but he kept pushing himself into her life. Jake and Paulina ended genuinely falling in love, but Paulina felt she could not be with Jake. Jake was torn between reconciling with Paulina and getting Marley back. When Marley left town, Jake wormed his way back into Paulina's life. Paulina agreed to give their marriage another chance, but Jake put things in jeopardy when he went along with Vicky's scam to pretend that her son, Kirkland, was a foundling that Paulina had discovered (Vicky was trying hide Kirkland from his father Grant Harrison). Jake ruined his marriage to Paulina when he got in over his head with loan sharks and was presumed dead. Stricken with amnesia, he made himself a ton of cash as Bunny Eberhardt. Jake returned to Bay City, to find Paulina had moved on—she was in love with private detective Joe Carlino. Paulina had had enough of Jake's scheming and made it clear their marriage was over for good. Jake did his best to break up Jake and Vicky, but eventually had to accept that Paulina, like Marley, had moved on.

Jake became fixated on Vicky, who was twice divorced and raising two young boys. Jake wanted his best friend to be more than just a friend, but Vicky was not ready to move on after the death of her fiancé Ryan Harrison. Jake continued to try to get closer to Vicky, and might have succeeded, if Bobby Reno, a mysterious carpenter, had not showed up on Vicky's doorstep. Vicky and Bobby fell in love and Jake was left in the cold.

Jake had almost given up all hope when Vicky learned the truth about Bobby—his real name was Shane Roberts, and he was a fugitive on the run, accused of killing his lover. Shane was eventually cleared, but the knowledge that Shane had lied about his past and that he was still married to a woman named Lila, put a wedge between them. Vicky grew close to Jake again and she accepted his marriage proposal. Kirkland was struck by a car on their wedding day so Jake and Vicky married at his hospital bedside.

Jake and Vicky were separated briefly after Shane and Michael died, because Jake learned that Vicky had lied to him that night, and had gone to the Love family cabin with Shane. During this time, Marley returned to town, and was run down by her mother in the cemetery. After radical surgery that altered her face, Jake began spending more and more time with Marley. Marley began to believe that Jake still felt the way he used to about her and became obsessed with getting him back. Jake and Vicky reconciled, but their happiness didn't last long once Vicky disappeared after Grant Harrison was shot. For months Jake despaired over the loss of his wife, turning more and more to Marley. He was shocked to discover that it was Marley who had kidnapped Vicky, believing that it would help her and Jake get back together. Jake refused to forgive and forget, bringing Marley's past up constantly, all the while ignoring his own substantial role in her break down. He has moved out of the house, but the sudden arrival of Sean (who turns out to be the son his brother Kevin Anderson fathered as a young teenager and never mentioned) throws the two of them back together. Jake and Vicky are later thrilled to find out they are expecting twin girls.

=== As the World Turns ===
Jake McKinnon's arrival in Oakdale was sudden and unexpected. Jake was unexpectedly thrust into one of Oakdale's biggest stories when he inadvertently hired the baby nurse who helped to hold Emily Stewart hostage. After helping to get the nurse to confess, he followed Tom Hughes to Oakdale to get a story. Almost immediately upon arriving in town, he was offered a job as Managing Editor of the City Times. Anxious for the chance to work at a larger paper in a larger town, Jake accepted.

Jake's first big story was the investigation into the life of Alec Wallace. Jake was determined to get the entire story behind Wallace's illegal activities and stood up to his boss, Lucinda, when she tried to get him to go for the quick and easy headline. Soon, Jake got too close to the story and an attempt was made on his life. Fearing for his wife's safety, Jake convinced her to get a bodyguard and leave the country, only to have her plane crash due to the guard's sabotage. Jake tried to deal with his loss with help from Lucinda as well as rival reporter, Julia Lindsay. However, it wasn't Julia who would change Jake's life, but Molly Conlan. Jake admired Molly's spunk and was sympathetic about all the troubles she'd had since he had plenty skeletons in his own past. When Molly was injured and in a coma, Jake took it upon himself to visit her often. When she finally came to, she was touched by his friendship and dedication and the pair became very close.

Then Molly started experiencing visions of Jake's ex-wife, Vicky. Though skeptical, Jake decided to humor Molly and investigate. Through the course of the investigation, the pair fell in love and discovered a startling fact: Vicky's babies did not die with her in the plane crash; she gave birth before she died. Learning that the two girls were being raised by a farmer in Canada, Jake brought the girls, Michelle and Bridget, with him to Oakdale and then asked Molly to marry him.

Soon after their engagement, Jake and Molly's life started to take a tragic turn. The trouble began with the arrival of Nick Scudder, an old high school boyfriend of Molly's. Though he seemed to be a great guy, Molly didn't trust him for a second and when the twins disappeared, she blamed Nick. However, with Nick's help the real culprit was found, the twins' nanny, Mary. Though Nick was now a hero in Abigail's eyes, Molly was still very wary of him. At the same time, while planning her wedding to Jake, Molly was dismayed when her criminal record was plastered on The City Times' webpage. Ashamed of her racy past, Molly wanted to break off her engagement to Jake, but he wouldn't let her. Instead Jake reassured her that he loved her no matter what and the two married in a beautiful ceremony at the Walsh estate. Though ecstatically happy, Molly continued to be wary of Abigail's friendship with Nick, and for good reason. Months after her wedding, Molly found out that Abigail was planning to run off with Nick. Disgusted, Molly warned him to stay away from her daughter, which he agreed to do for a huge amount of money. Not long after, Nick was found dead and Abigail (who had since learned of Nick's deception) was found unconscious with no memory of Nick's death.

Trying to protect her daughter, Molly confessed to the crime, but soon evidence came forth showing Abigail to be the prime suspect. Working with Jake to investigate Nick's death, they discovered another suspect: their former nanny, Mary, who was in love with Nick. Though Mary initially denied the charge, Abigail's memory eventually came back and, after a confrontation with Mary, she remembered that Mary was the killer. Abigail's brother, Aaron, was on hand to hear Mary confess and the charges against Abigail were dropped. The nightmare was far from over. Her secret uncovered, Mary became unhinged and took Molly hostage in exchange for one million dollars. Without police help, Jake stormed in to rescue Molly and, though he succeeded, it was at the cost of his own life as he was shot while wrestling a gun away from Mary. After Jake's death, Bridget and Michelle were taken back to Bay City by Vicky's mother and sister.
