= Bob Schwarz =

American television director

Bob Schwarz is an American television director. He served as Director on Search for Tomorrow, Sesame Street, Candid Camera, The Electric Company, Spin-off, As the World Turns and Another World (1996).

== Awards and nominations ==
Schwarz has been nominated for eight Daytime Emmy awards for his work on Another World and As the World Turns, in the categories Outstanding Direction for a Drama Series and Outstanding Drama Series Directing Team. His nominations range from 1985 to 1995, with one win in 1992. His first nomination was shared with Maria Wagner, Richard Dunlap, Paul Lammers, Richard Pepperman, Portman Paget, and Joel Aronowitz, while his win was shared with Michael Eilbaum, Casey Childs, Susan C. Strickler Carol Sedwick, Mary Madeiras, and Janet Andrews.
