= Iris Wheeler =

- Another World character
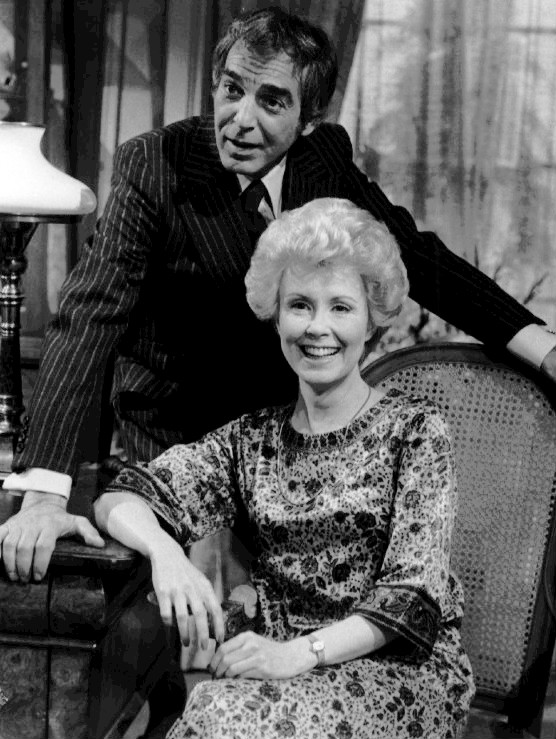
- Beverlee McKinsey as Iris Wheeler, along with Paul Stevens as Brian Bancroft
- Portrayed by: Beverlee McKinsey (1972–1981); Carole Shelley (1980); Carmen Duncan (1988–1994)
- Duration: 1972–1981; 1988–1994
- First appearance: December 22, 1972
- Last appearance: September 19, 1994
- Created by: Harding Lemay
- Introduced by: Paul Rauch (1972, 1980); Michael Laibson (1988)
- Spin-off appearances: Texas
- Carmen Duncan as Iris Wheeler
In-universe information
- Other names: Iris Cory
- Occupation: Socialite; CEO of Cory Publishing; Editor-in-Chief of Sophisticates; Chairman of the Board of Directors of Bay City Memorial Hospital
- Parents: Mac Cory; Sylvie Kosloff
- Adoptive parents: Emily Cory
- Siblings: Sandy Cory; Paulina Carlino; Amanda Cory; Matthew Cory (legal)
- Spouse: Eliot Carrington (1960s–1974); Robert Delaney (1976–1977); Brian Bancroft (1977–1980); Alex Wheeler (1980–1981)
- Children: Dennis Wheeler
- Grandchildren: Sarah Matthews-Wheeler
- Grandparents: Alexandra Cory
- Aunts and uncles: Alfred Cory; Myrtle Benson
- Nieces and nephews: Dante Carlino; Alex Cory; Maggie Cory; Alli Fowler; Remy Woods; Jasmine Cory (legal)
- First cousins: Neal Cory; Adam Cory

Iris Wheeler is a fictional character from the daytime soap opera Another World. First portrayed by Beverlee McKinsey from 1972 until 1980, Iris was one of the show's most iconic characters and received her own short-lived spin-off, Texas. Carmen Duncan took over the role from 1988 until 1994.

== Casting ==
Having previously appeared on Another World as Emma Frame in May 1972, Beverlee McKinsey so impressed Harding Lemay (then-head writer), he created the role of Iris for her to return. Manipulative and scheming Iris was a staunch contrast to meek and dowdy Emma.

== Character history ==
=== Backstory ===
Iris was a glamorous socialite who traveled the world looking for excitement. She had a happy and privileged childhood as the daughter of wealthy publisher, Mac Cory and his wife, Emily. Iris was the product of an affair between Mac and Sylvie Kosloff. Sylvie was sent to prison while pregnant with Iris. She asked Emily to adopt her daughter and she agreed. Iris grew up believing Emily was her birth mother, while Mac believed Iris was adopted.

While being pursued by Eliot Carrington (James Douglas), Iris had a brief fling with Alex Wheeler (Bert Kramer), who eventually left her. Upon discovering she was pregnant with Alex's child, Iris accepted Eliot's marriage proposal so her child could have a father. She gave birth to a son named Dennis (Mike Hammett). Iris grew tired of domestic life and left Dennis and Elliot to return to globe-trotting.

=== Life in Bay City ===
Iris arrived at Eliot's New York City apartment to find a beautiful woman by the name of Alice Talbot (Jacqueline Courtney) working as Dennis's nanny. Eliot was pursuing Alice and Iris schemed to break the two up since she had been hoping for a reconciliation. Dennis was diagnosed with a heart condition and Eliot took him to Alice's hometown of Bay City to receive treatment. Iris also moved there and was soon joined by her beloved father, Mac. Iris loved Mac to the point of desperation and believed she should be the number one priority in his life. Mac decided to stay in Bay City and set up an office of his publishing house, Cory Publishing, much to Iris's delight.

Dennis recovered and Eliot left town, leaving him with Iris. Iris began dating Dr. Russ Matthews (David Bailey), who had taken care of Dennis. Iris set Mac up with Russ's aunt, Liz Matthews (Irene Dailey). Liz and Mac dated for a short time, but it was another, much younger woman who stole his heart: Rachel Frame (Victoria Wyndham). Iris was disgusted that her father had fallen in love with a lower-class woman like Rachel, who was younger than Iris no less. Nonetheless, Mac and Rachel married. Iris spent the next few years doing just about everything to break them up, including hiring Long Island playboy Philip Wainwright (James Luisi) to try and seduce Rachel and encouraging Mac's ex-girlfriend Tracy DeWitt (Caroline McWilliams) to woo him away from Rachel. All of Iris's schemes failed and drove a wedge in between her and Mac. Russ had also grown tired of Iris's antics and broke off their engagement. Rachel became pregnant and, one day, felt sharp pain in her abdomen. When she called out to Iris for help, Iris ignored her and Rachel had a miscarriage. When Mac discovered this, he disinherited Iris.

Iris set her sights on an architect named Robert Delaney (Nicolas Coster), who was dating Clarice Hobson (Gail Brown). When they broke up, he and Iris got together. Iris found out that Clarice was pregnant with Robert's baby, but she still married him. Iris told Clarice to keep her mouth shut about her child's paternity and terrorized the helpless woman with threats of taking her baby away from her. When Robert discovered her deception, he left her.

Dennis became ill again, leading to Mac and Iris reconciling. Iris began dating attorney Brian Bancroft (Paul Stevens). Brian did not treat Iris like the other men she had been with had treated her. He did not try to change her, but at the same time called her out on her behavior. They eventually got married.

Rachel gave birth to Iris's little sister, Amanda (Nicole Catalanotto). It was accidentally revealed by Mac that Iris was adopted when she heard him say that Amanda was his firstborn child. Iris was devastated by this revelation. She decided to find her birth parents and eventually tracked down her birth mother, Sylvie Kosloff (Leora Dana). Although she was disappointed to learn that Sylvie was lower-class, the two managed to form a solid relationship. Around the same time, Iris met Kirk Laverty (Charles Cioffi) and they began an affair. Kirk wanted to take over Cory Publishing and convinced Iris to vote against Mac in a takeover bid, but Kirk's plan backfired. Kirk was murdered by Jeff Stone (Dan Hamilton), but it was Iris who became the number one suspect. Luckily, she was able to clear her name.

Iris also managed to find time to interfere in her son's life. She was horrified when she found out Dennis (now played by Jim Poyner) was having an affair with a much older Elena DePouglinac (Christina Pickles). She tried to set him up with Elena's daughter, Cecile DePouglinac (Susan Keith). However, Cecile wanted Iris's stepbrother (Rachel's son), Jamie Frame (Richard Bekins), who was also Dennis's best friend. Iris paid a woman to seduce Jamie away from Cecile so Dennis could have her. Cecile found out and told Brian, who asked Iris for a divorce because he was tired of her manipulations. Dennis moved to Houston, Texas to become an art buyer for a gallery.

=== Life in Texas ===
Iris joined Dennis in Texas not long after his move. While there, she ran into her former lover, Alex Wheeler. The two reignited their love affair and Iris revealed that Alex was Dennis's father, not Eliot, leaving Dennis devastated. Iris and Alex married however, but he died less than a year later. Alex had helped quell Iris's conniving ways, but after his death Iris became bitter and vengeful yet again. She zeroed her rediscovered vindictiveness in on Dennis's new wife Paige Marshall (Lisby Larson), with whom Iris shared an already contentious relationship. Unearthing Paige's past as a porn star, Iris schemed to use the information to drive Paige out of town, but it only led to the appearance of Paige's seedy former lover Chris Shaw (Benjamin Hendrickson), who had forced a young Paige into making illicit underground films years before in New York City. Eventually, Shaw was murdered, with Iris, Paige and Dennis as the leading suspects. When this situation was cleared up, Iris found herself receiving the arrival of Alex's younger brother Grant Wheeler (Donald May), who took over Alex's worldwide oil company and settled his own family into Texas. Needing a fresh start, Iris handed the Wheeler mansion over to her brother-in-law and left Texas, returning yet again to her globe-trotting, socialite ways.

=== Iris returns ===
Iris (now played by Carmen Duncan) returned to Bay City in 1988. Mac was happy to see his daughter again while Rachel still had her reservations about Iris, but opted to remain civil about it for Mac's sake. Iris came back with some surprising news: the previous year she had visited Sylvie, who was on her deathbed, and she had revealed that Iris was in fact Mac's biological daughter. This made Iris more determined than ever to win over her father once and for all.

Iris began scheming as soon as she arrived in Bay City. She hired her lover, Evan Frame (Charles Grant), to seduce a married Amanda (now played by Sandra Ferguson) to disgrace her in Mac's eyes. This planned failed when Evan felt guilty and confessed everything to Amanda. She set up a fake company called Bennett Publishing to bring Cory Publishing to the brink of destruction so she could rush in, save it, and make Mac proud. The only thing that was known about this mysterious publishing house was that it was run by someone called "The Chief." Rachel teamed up with Donna Hudson (Anna Stuart) to discover The Chief's identity. Once it was discovered it was Iris, Rachel confronted her and demanded she tell Mac. Iris tearfully told her father the truth. Mac was furious and disowned Iris yet again. He left for Maine to think things over shortly afterwards but died of a heart attack before he could return. Iris was devastated that her father never forgave her before his death.

Mac did not completely disown Iris since he left her large shares in Cory Publishing. However, he also left equal shares to Rachel and Amanda. Rachel and Iris battled over who would become CEO. When the vote came down it was a tie between Rachel and Iris and it was none other than Jamie's estranged wife, Vicky (Anne Heche), who could break the tie. Vicky voted for Iris since Rachel had refused to give her custody of her and Jamie's son, Steven. Iris became CEO of Cory Publishing, proudly continuing on her father's legacy. Later on, at the suggestion of Cory Board member, Ross Gordon, Iris was named president while Rachel was named CEO and chairman of the board.

A complication arose when a woman named Paulina Cantrell (Cali Timmins) arrived in Bay City and claimed to be Mac's daughter. Iris did not want another person to battle over her family's wealth. She paid Jake McKinnon (Tom Eplin) to prove Paulina was a liar. By this time, Rachel and Iris were on good terms and she did not want Rachel to know about her scheme against Paulina, who Rachel had welcomed into the family. Jake blackmailed Iris, telling her he would expose her to Rachel if she did not pay up. When Jake was shot, Iris was one of many suspects. Jake fell into a coma and, with no other witnesses, the perpetrator remained unknown. Jake's ex-wife, Marley Hudson (Anne Heche), was charged with his attempted murder. It turned out that Paulina had shot Jake, but this was never exposed, because rather than turn her in, Jake blackmailed Paulina into marriage to get his hands on the Cory fortune. At their wedding, Iris acknowledged Paulina (now played by Judi Evans) as her sister, though she was disgusted that Jake was now a part of her family. Dennis (now played by Chris Bruno), who Iris had had limited contact with over the years, came to town for the wedding and he agreed to start over with his mother.

For a period of time, Iris mellowed out. She formed a close relationship with Dennis and got along well with her family. She became engaged to Lucas (John Aprea), who comforted her in the aftermath of Mac's passing, but they broke up when he returned to his ex-wife, Felicia Gallant (Linda Dano). She later dates Spencer Harrison (David Hedison) for a year, but they broke up when they realized they did not want a commitment from each other. Iris next began dating Hank Kent (Steve Fletcher), who was unlike any man Iris had ever been with. Hank was working-class and unimpressed with Iris's high-class lifestyle. Iris formed a close bond with Hank's young son, Tommy (Cory Lee Rogers), who playfully called her "I.W." Iris tried to settle into a domestic life with the Kents, but it soon became apparent it was not for her. Over time, Iris became so caught up with her family's problems that Hank had enough and broke off their engagement.

Iris also became a grandmother when Dennis had a baby with Russ's daughter, Olivia Matthews (Allison Hossack). At first, she did not like the idea of Dennis having a baby with Olivia, who she believed was a gold digger, and tried to pay her off. When Iris saw how much Dennis wanted to be in the baby's life, she became more supportive. Olivia left town and gave birth to their daughter, Sarah. Iris comforted Dennis, who was devastated he could not see his daughter.

Iris was enraged when Rachel fell in love with the Cory family's sworn enemy, Carl Hutchins (Charles Keating). When Rachel and Carl announced their engagement, Iris plotted to ruin their wedding. She decided to fire blanks at Carl while he stood at the altar to scare him. Her plan went horribly wrong when a newly returned Evan (now played by Eric Scott Woods) put real bullets into her gun. Iris ended up actually shooting Carl and almost killing him. She was arrested and charged with attempted murder. She was found guilty and sentenced to eight years in prison.

== Reception ==
A writer from Soap Opera Digest called McKinsey's Iris "the show’s centerpiece." In 2024, Charlie Mason from Soaps She Knows placed Iris 11th on his ranked list of Soaps' 40 Most Iconic Characters of All Time, writing, "Daytime may never have known a bigger bitch than the one that the late Beverlee McKinsey played from 1972-80; the character was so popular, she was given her own spinoff!"
