= Carolyn Culliton =

American daytime radio and television writer

Carolyn Culliton (née DeMoney) is an American daytime radio and television writer. Born in Indiana, she graduated from Northwestern University. Her husband is fellow daytime serial writer Richard Culliton.

== Positions held ==
All My Children

- Breakdown Writer: March 2, 1992 - May 20, 1994

Another World

- Head Writer: November 21, 1994 - August 18, 1995
- Associate Head Writer: 1984 - 1985, 1986–1991, 1998 - June 25, 1999
- Script Writer: 1985, 1998

Culltion's AW Team: November 21, 1994 - August 18, 1995; her writing team consisted of Sharon Epstein, Peter Brash, Elizabeth Page, Sofia Landon Geier, Janet Iacobuzio, Victor Miller, Samuel D. Ratcliffe, Craig Carlson, Judith Pinsker, Lorraine Broderick, Mimi Leahey, and Kathleen Kennedy.

As the World Turns

- Co-Head Writer: 1999 - 2001
- Associate Head Writer: October 15, 2001 - October 31, 2002, Spring 2004 - August 27, 2004

Days of Our Lives

- Script Editor : 2010–2023
- Script Writer: February 22, 2010 – October 20, 2023

General Hospital

- Co-Head-Writer: 1997

Guiding Light

- Head Writer: 1983
- Co-Head Writer: November 18, 2002 - September 12, 2003
- Associate Head Writer: 1984, 1995, 2003

Loving

- Associate Head Writer: 1995

One Life to Live

- Script Writer: August 31, 2005 – November 15, 2007
- Script Editor: October 2007 - February 7, 2008, April 23, 2008 – 2010)

Port Charles

- Co-Head Writer: June 1, 1997 - October 13, 1997

Sunset Beach

- Script Writer: 1999

The City

- Associate Head Writer: November 13, 1995 - March 28, 1997
- Secretary to Paul Rauch in 1983

== Awards and nominations ==
Daytime Emmy Awards

WINS

- (2001, 2002 & 2005; Best Writing; As the World Turns)
- (2008; Best Writing; One Life to Live)
- (2012; Best Writing; Days of Our Lives)

NOMINATIONS

- (1985; Best Writing; Guiding Light)
- (1985, 1989 & 1996; Best Writing; Another World)
- (1993; Best Writing; All My Children)
- (2000 & 2003; Best Writing; As the World Turns)
- (2006 & 2009; Best Writing; One Life to Live)
- (2011 & 2014; Best Writing; Days of Our Lives)

Writers Guild of America Award

WINS

- (2014 season; Days of Our Lives)

NOMINATIONS

- (1985 season; Guiding Light)
- (1994 season; All My Children)
- (1995 & 1996 seasons; Another World)
- (2006, 2009, 2010 & 2011 seasons; One Life to Live)
- (2013 & 2015 seasons; Days of Our Lives)

== Head writing tenure ==
Preceded by L. Virginia Browne; Gene Palumbo	Head Writer of Guiding Light (with Richard Culliton and Gary Tomlin); April 4 - June 24, 1983	Succeeded by Pam Long; Richard Culliton
Preceded by Peggy Sloane	Head Writer of Another World; November 21, 1994 – August 18, 1995	Succeeded by Tom King; Craig Carlson
Preceded by none	Head Writer of Port Charles (with Richard Culliton); June 1 – October 13, 1997	Succeeded by Lynn Marie Latham
Preceded by Lorraine Broderick; Hal Corley; Addie Walsh	Head Writer of As the World Turns (with Leah Laiman: June 28, 1999 - June 12, 2000) (with Hal Corley and Stephen Demorest: June 13, 2000 - July 13, 2001) (with Hogan Sheffer: June 13, 2000 - September 20, 2002) (with Jean Passanante: June 16, 2001 - September 20, 2002); June 28, 1999 – September 20, 2002	Succeeded by Hogan Sheffer; Jean Passanante
Preceded by Lloyd Gold; Christopher Dunn	Head Writer of Guiding Light (with Millee Taggart); November 18, 2002 - September 12, 2003	Succeeded by Ellen Weston; Donna Swajeski
