= Laibson =

Laibson is a surname. Notable people with the surname include:

- David Laibson (born 1966), American economist
- Michael Laibson, American television producer and theatre director

== See also ==
- Lainson
