= Victoria Hudson =

Victoria Hudson may refer to:

- Vicky Hudson, a character in the NBC daytime soap opera Another World and the CBS daytime soap opera As the World Turns
- Victoria Hudson (athlete) (born 1996), Austrian athlete
