= Peggy Sloane =

American writer (1943–2009)

- High school yearbook photo of Margaret Merrill Sloane, from 1961
- Born: Margaret Merrill Sloane; October 18, 1943; Bryn Mawr, Pennsylvania, U.S.
- Died: May 11, 2009 (aged 65); Peabody, Massachusetts, U.S.
- Other name: Peggy Sloane Wallace
- Occupation: Television writer

Peggy Sloane (October 18, 1943 – May 11, 2009) was an American television soap opera script writer for more than 23 years, until 1999. She won two Daytime Emmy Awards and a Writers Guild of America Award for her work.

== Early life and education ==
Margaret Merrill "Peggy" Sloane was born in Bryn Mawr, Pennsylvania, the daughter of Joseph Curtis Sloane Jr. and Marjorie Merrill Sloane. Her father was an art historian and college professor. She graduated from Chapel Hill High School in North Carolina in 1961, and in 1965 graduated from Wellesley College, where she was elected to Phi Beta Kappa, was a Durant Scholar, and won the Judith Brown Cook Prize in English.

== Career ==
Sloane was a writer or co-writer on several television programs, especially soap operas, including Hocus Focus (TV series) (1979-1980), Capitol (1982–1987), All My Children (1987–1989, 1997–1998), Another World (1990–1992, head writer 1992–1994), Guiding Light (1994–1995), One Life to Live (1995-1996, co-head-writer 1996-1997), and As the World Turns (1998–1999). She won Daytime Emmy Awards in 1988 and 1998 for the writing on All My Children, and was nominated in 1994 and 2000 for writing on Another World and As the World Turns, respectively. She also won a Writers Guild of America Award in 1999, for All My Children, and was nominated six other times. Sloane was known for handling storylines with sensitive themes, such as a character learning he has bipolar disorder.

== Head writing tenure ==
Preceded by Donna Swajeski	Head writer of Another World (with Samuel D. Ratcliffe); November 30, 1992 – November 18, 1994	Succeeded by Carolyn Culliton
Preceded by Michael Malone	Head writer of One Life to Live (with Jean Passanante) (with Leah Laiman: April 1, 1996 – December 27, 1996); April 1, 1996 – June 27, 1997	Succeeded by Claire Labine; Matthew Labine

== Personal life ==
Sloane was married to businessman David Wallace. She died in 2009, after living more than a decade with Alzheimer's disease, in Peabody, Massachusetts.
