= 13th Daytime Emmy Awards =

- Date: July 17, 1986
- Location: Waldorf-Astoria Hotel
- Presented by: National Academy of Television Arts and Sciences

Highlights
- Outstanding Drama Series: The Young and the Restless
- Outstanding Game Show: The $25,000 Pyramid

Television/radio coverage
- Network: NBC

The 13th Daytime Emmy Awards were held on Thursday, July 17, 1986, on NBC to commemorate excellence in daytime programming from March 6, 1985 to March 5, 1986. The telecast, lasting from 3-4:30 p.m., preempted Santa Barbara.

Winners in each category are in bold.

== Outstanding Daytime Drama Series ==
- All My Children
- As the World Turns
- General Hospital
- **The Young and the Restless**

== Outstanding Actor in a Daytime Drama Series ==
- **David Canary (Adam Chandler and Stuart Chandler, All My Children**)
- Scott Bryce (Craig Montgomery, As the World Turns)
- Larry Bryggman (John Dixon, As the World Turns)
- Robert S. Woods (Bo Buchanan, One Life to Live)
- Nicolas Coster (Lionel Lockridge, Santa Barbara)
- Terry Lester (Jack Abbott, The Young and the Restless)

== Outstanding Actress in a Daytime Drama Series ==
- Susan Lucci (Erica Kane, All My Children)
- Elizabeth Hubbard (Lucinda Walsh, As the World Turns)
- Peggy McCay (Caroline Brady, Days of Our Lives)
- Kim Zimmer (Reva Shayne, Guiding Light)
- **Erika Slezak** (**Victoria Lord**, **One Life to Live**)

== Outstanding Supporting Actor in a Daytime Drama Series ==
- Louis Edmonds (Langley Wallingford, All My Children)
- Gregg Marx (Tom Hughes, As the World Turns)
- **John Wesley Shipp** (**Douglas Cummings, As the World Turns**)
- Larry Gates (H.B. Lewis, Guiding Light)
- Al Freeman, Jr. (Ed Hall, One Life to Live)

== Outstanding Supporting Actress in a Daytime Drama Series ==
- Eileen Herlie (Myrtle Fargate, All My Children)
- Kathleen Widdoes (Emma Snyder, As the World Turns)
- **Leann Hunley** (**Anna DiMera**, **Days of Our Lives**)
- Uta Hagen (Hortense, One Life to Live)
- Dame Judith Anderson (Minx Lockridge, Santa Barbara)

== Outstanding Young Man in a Daytime Drama Series ==
- **Michael E. Knight (Tad Martin, All My Children**)
- Don Scardino (Chris Chapin, Another World)
- Brian Bloom (Dusty Donovan, As the World Turns)
- Jon Hensley (Holden Snyder, As the World Turns)
- Vincent Irizarry (Lujack Luvonaczek, Guiding Light)

== Outstanding Ingenue in a Daytime Drama Series ==
- Debbi Morgan (Angie Hubbard, All My Children)
- **Ellen Wheeler (Vicky Hudson and Marley Hudson, Another World**)
- Martha Byrne (Lily Walsh, As the World Turns)
- Robin Wright (Kelly Capwell, Santa Barbara)
- Jane Krakowski (T.R. Kendall, Search for Tomorrow)

== Outstanding Daytime Drama Series Writing ==
- General Hospital
- As the World Turns
- **Guiding Light (John B Kuntz)**
- The Young and the Restless

NOTE: The award was originally given to The Young and the Restless until a tally miscount forced The Young and the Restless to hand over the award to Guiding Light.

== Outstanding Daytime Drama Series Directing ==
- As the World Turns
- Guiding Light
- **The Young and the Restless**
- Days of our Lives
- One Life to Live

== Outstanding Game Show ==
- **The $25,000 Pyramid** - A Bob-Sande Stewart Production for CBS (Syn. by 20th Century Fox)
- Family Feud - A Mark Goodson Production for ABC (Syn. by Viacom)
- Jeopardy! - A Merv Griffin Production (Syn. by KingWorld)
- The Price Is Right - A Mark Goodson Production for CBS (Syn. by Television Program Source)
- Wheel of Fortune - A Merv Griffin Production for NBC (Syn. by KingWorld)

== Outstanding Game Show Host ==
- **Dick Clark** (The $25,000 Pyramid)
- Bob Barker (The Price Is Right)
- Pat Sajak (Wheel of Fortune)

== Outstanding Animated Program ==
- **Jim Henson, Margaret Loesch, Lee Gunther, Bob Richardson, John Gibbs and Jeffrey Scott (Muppet Babies)**
- Paul Bogrow, Buzz Potamkin, Steve Lumley, Allan Stevens and Chris Cuddington (CBS Storybreak)
- Lee Mendelson, Bill Melendez and Charles M. Schulz (The Charlie Brown and Snoopy Show)
- Bill Cosby, Lou Scheimer, Marsh Lamore, Steve Gerber and Phil Harnage (Fat Albert and the Cosby Kids)
- William Hanna, Joseph Barbera, Gerard Baldwin, Bob Hathcock, Ray Patterson, Patsy Cameron and Tedd Anasti (The Smurfs)
