= Summer Desire =

Summer Desire is the name of the first and only night-time special aired under the Another World soap opera banner. Touted as special event programming, the hour-long episode aired just before the Daytime Emmy Awards on June 23, 1992.

Unlike other soaps, which also aired one-off specials at night, the Another World special followed existing storylines, in the hopes that viewers tuning in early for the Daytime Emmys would be intrigued with what they saw and, by extension, would watch the show in the afternoon.

The universal theme was love, and the stories followed four existing (and popular) couples in the series. To appeal to many demographics, thirtyish couple Cass (Stephen Schnetzer) and Frankie (Alice Barrett) were featured, as well as twentysomethings Ryan and Vicky (Paul Michael Valley and Jensen Buchanan) and Jake and Paulina (Tom Eplin and Judi Evans Luciano). Teen supercouple Dean and Jenna (Ricky Paull Goldin and Alla Korot) received most of the story in the special episode, as a party was being thrown in honor of his new album. On the show, Dean was a budding singer, and an album was produced. One of his songs, Ladykiller, became wildly popular and was played on the Times Square Jumbotron in the special episode.

Other stories revolved around Jake and Paulina seeking out a justice of the peace to get married, only to end up calling it off, while Ryan and Vicky fought their attraction to one another, only to give in to their desires at the end of the episode.

The special brought in low ratings, ranking 78th out of 96 programs that week with a 6.1/11 rating/share, ranking a distant third in its timeslot, behind Full House (#11, 12.7/24) and Home Improvement (#3, 14.8/27) on ABC, and Rescue 911 (#14, 12.3/23) on CBS. Another AW nighttime special was not attempted, although its sister show, Days of Our Lives, produced more one-off episodes.
