= Bill Wolff (announcer) =

American announcer (1927–2014)

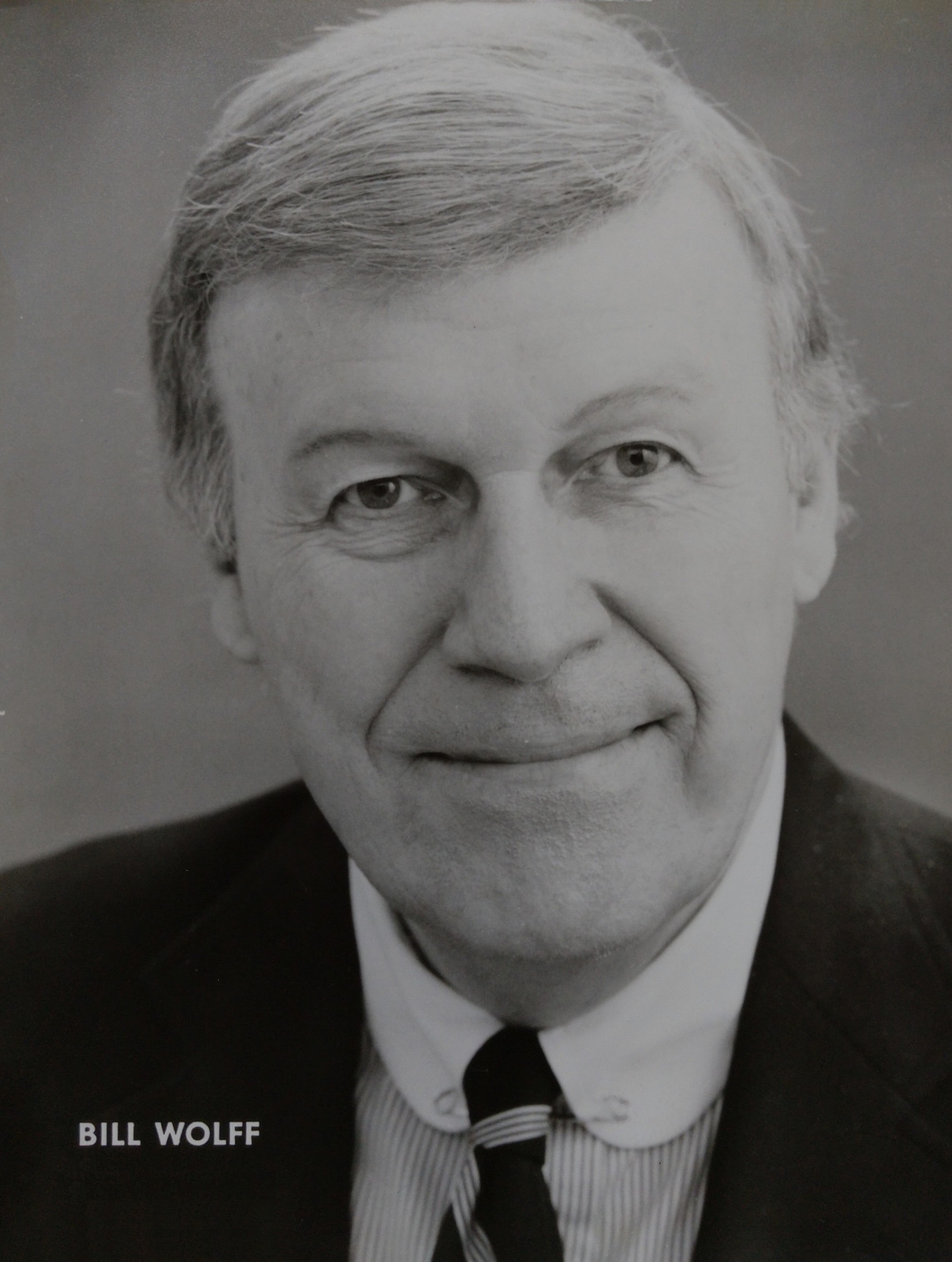
- Wolff in 1995
- Born: William Bernard Wolff; June 2, 1927; Cincinnati, Ohio, United States
- Died: February 27, 2014 (aged 86); Floral Park, New York, United States
- Other name: William "Bill" Wolff
- Occupation: Announcer
- Years active: 1942–2005
- Known for: Announcer for Another World
- Bill Wolff Narration Wolff narrates terrain over Alaskan coastline.

Bill Wolff (June 2, 1927 – February 27, 2014) was a staff announcer for WNBC and the NBC network who worked for over six decades as a radio and television announcer. He is best known for announcing the soap opera Another World from 1964 until 1987.

== Early career ==
Wolff began his career in American broadcasting at the age of 15 for WKRC in Cincinnati, a CBS affiliate, in 1942.

Wolff began his television broadcasting career at the age of 26, by this time he was already a seasoned announcer. Following his Navy service in World War Two, Wolff began free lance television work with WLW-T in Cincinnati, WLW-D in Dayton and WLW-C in Columbus. At WLW-T he worked on a television show called "Live It Again", which he deemed his most difficult announcing assignment, as it involved his "memorizing over 15 minutes of Dates, Names and Places" for each half-hour show. Also featured on the show were the McGuire Sisters on the Arthur Godfrey Programs.

Wolff's deep, authoritative voice made him a natural as a newscaster with Paramount-Movietone News on WCPO-TV Cincinnati. In 1950, Wolff was offered a position at WHFC station in Chicago, where he handled a variety of announcing and broadcasting assignments. Wolff was added to the WBBM staff in April 1953 as a summer relief, but proved to be too good to lose and quickly became a full-time staff announcer.

At WBBM, Wolff hosted the Saturday afternoon show Music, Inc. and became known for his on-the-air personality and choices in popular music. This made his radio show a smooth and sophisticated music program. Wolff also had a WBBM newscast every Sunday night and a Saturday evening sports review show. He also hosted the WBBM "Music for You", the CBS Network "Chicagoans" and the musical broadcasts from Melody Mill, Argon and Truanon, renowned ballroom venues in Chicago.

In 1960, Bill Wolff moved to New York City and began his career with National Broadcasting Company (NBC).
