= David Forsyth (actor) =

American soap opera actor

David Forsyth is an American actor who was born September 18, 1947 in Long Beach, California.

Forsyth was born into a military family and served with the Marines from 1967 to 1971, during the Vietnam War. He served as a paramedic during the war and after the war worked as a paramedic and fireman in Florida.

Forsyth became interested in acting and was cast on several soap operas. He played T.J. Canfield on the short lived Texas (1981–1982), and Burke Donovan on As the World Turns in 1983. He played Henderson Herald reporter Hogan McCleary in Search for Tomorrow, a role he played until that show ended in 1986. He left the show in 1984, but returned seven months later in 1985.

Forsyth's longest stint was as Vietnam vet and physician John Hudson on Another World from 1987 to 1997. Forsyth credited then-executive producer John Whitesell with the idea to bring his own Vietnam experiences to the role of John, which helped him process his own complicated experiences in the war.

He was nominated for Outstanding Supporting Actor in a Drama Series at the Daytime Emmy Awards for his role in Another World. He was nominated again in 1996 for the same role.

Forsyth replaced Roscoe Born in the role of Jim Thomasen on All My Children in 1997 to wrap up the story after Born abruptly left the show.

He also had a cameo in one episode of Sex and the City as Miranda's boss.

On the April 30, 2020 episode of The Locher Room, a YouTube series interviewing actors and behind the scenes professionals who worked on soap operas, actress Anna Holbrook, a former acting partner of Forsyth, revealed that he had recent health struggles, including a stroke which necessitated a feeding tube for a time.
