= Susan Strickler =

American television director

- Occupation: television director
- Years active: 1987-present
- Known for: Another World
- Awards: Daytime Emmy Award, Directors Guild of America Award

Susan C. Strickler is an American television, documentary and theatre director. She has been nominated for three Daytime Emmys (1992, 1993, 2005) and won once in 1992. She was also nominated for two Directors Guild of America Awards and won once in 1992. The DGA win was shared with Mary Madeiras, Dennis Cameron, Cynthia Flood Jacobsen, Arthur Lewis and Karen Wilkins.

== Directing/Producing credits ==
- "The Vow From Hiroshima" (2020) Full Length Documentary (https://www.bullfrogcommunities.com/thevowfromhiroshima)
- The Young and the Restless (September 2007 – 2009)
- All My Children (2004–2005)
- Guiding Light (1997–2005)
- 13 Bourbon Street (Producer 1996)
- One Life to Live (1995–1997)
- General Hospital (1994)
- Valley of the Dolls (1994)
- Another World (Producer: 1987–1991) (Director 1991–1993)
