= 2nd Daytime Emmy Awards =

- Date: May 15, 1975
- Location: Aboard the S.S. Dayliner
- Presented by: National Academy of Television Arts and Sciences
- Hosted by: Monty Hall and Stephanie Edwards

Highlights
- Outstanding Drama Series: The Young and the Restless
- Outstanding Game Show: Hollywood Squares

Television/radio coverage
- Network: ABC

The 2nd Daytime Emmy Awards were held on Thursday, May 15, 1975, and broadcast on ABC to commemorate excellence in daytime programming from the previous year (1974). The event was hosted by Monty Hall and Stephanie Edwards. It was uniquely held on board the S.S. Dayliner in the Hudson River between New York City and New Jersey. It had cast off from New York's Pier 81 with 600 invited guests being accommodated for a luncheon before the awards telecast between 1:30-3 p.m. Eastern Daylight Time. The telecast preempted Let's Make a Deal, The $10,000 Pyramid and The Big Showdown.

Winners in each category are in bold.

== Outstanding Daytime Drama Series ==
- Another World
- Days of Our Lives
- **The Young and the Restless**

== Outstanding Actor in a Daytime Drama Series ==
- **Macdonald Carey** (Dr. Tom Horton, Days of our Lives)
- Bill Hayes (Doug Williams, Days of our Lives)
- John Beradino (Dr. Steve Hardy, General Hospital)

== Outstanding Actress in a Daytime Drama Series ==
- Ruth Warrick (Phoebe Tyler, All My Children)
- **Susan Flannery** (Laura Spencer, Days of our Lives)
- Susan Seaforth (Julie Olson, Days of our Lives)
- Rachel Ames (Audrey Hardy, General Hospital)

== Outstanding Actor in a Daytime Drama Special ==
- **Bradford Dillman** (The ABC Afternoon Playbreak - episode "Last Bride of Salem" (#2.6))

== Best Actress in a Daytime Drama Special ==
- **Kay Lenz** (The ABC Afternoon Playbreak)
- Diane Baker (The ABC Afternoon Playbreak)
- Julie Kavner (The ABC Afternoon Playbreak)

== Outstanding Individual Director in a Daytime Drama Series ==
- Ira Cirker (Another World)
- Joseph Behar (Days of our Lives)
- **Richard Dunlap** (The Young and the Restless)

== Outstanding Daytime Drama Series Writing ==
- **Another World**
- Days of our Lives
- The Young and the Restless

== Outstanding Daytime Drama Special ==
- **The ABC Afternoon Playbreak**: Ira Barmak (executive producer); Lila Garrett (producer); ABC - for episode "The Girl Who Couldn't Lose".
- The ABC Afternoon Playbreak: Robert Michael Lewis(executive producer); George Paris (producer); ABC - for episode "The Last Bride of Salem".

== Outstanding Game or Audience Participation Show ==
- **The Hollywood Squares** - Heatter & Quigley; NBC
- Jeopardy! - Robert Rudin; NBC
- The $10,000 Pyramid - Bob Stewart; ABC
- Let's Make a Deal - Stefan Hatos; ABC

== Outstanding Host in a Game Show or Audience Participation Show ==
- **Peter Marshall** (Hollywood Squares, NBC)
- Gene Rayburn (Match Game '74, CBS)
- Monty Hall (Let's Make a Deal, ABC)

== Outstanding Entertainment - Children's Series ==
- **Star Trek: The Animated Series** - Lou Scheimer, Norm Prescott (producers); NBC
- Captain Kangaroo - Jim Hirschfeld (producer); CBS
- The Pink Panther Show - Friz Freleng (producer); NBC
