= Craig Carlson =

American soap opera writer

Craig Carlson is an American soap opera (Daytime television) writer.

== Positions held ==
All My Children

- Breakdown Writer (1997 - 2002)

Another World

- Co-Head Writer (1995 - 1996; 1997)
- Breakdown Writer (1993 - 1995; 1996 - 1998)

Capitol

- Script Writer (1984)

Guiding Light

- Breakdown Writer (1995)

Loving

- Script Writer (1992-1993)

One Life to Live

- Co-Head Writer (1990-1991)
- Breakdown Writer (1985-1990)
- Script Writer (1982-1985)

== Awards and nominations ==
Daytime Emmy Awards

Wins

- (1987; Best Writing; One Life to Live)
- (1998; Best Writing; All My Children)

Nominations

- (1983, 1990 & 1992; Best Writing; One Life to Live)
- (1994 & 1996; Best Writing; Another World)
- (1999, 2001, 2002 & 2003; Best Writing; All My Children)

Writers Guild of America Award

Wins

- (1994 season; Loving)
- (1999, 2001 & 2002 seasons; All My Children)

Nominations

- (1984 season; Capitol)
- (1987 season; One Life to Live)
- (1994, 1995 & 1998 seasons; Another World)
- (1996 season; Guiding Light)
- (2000 season; All My Children)

== Head writing tenure ==
Preceded by S. Michael Schnessel	{{{title}}} September 17, 1990-September 6, 1991	Succeeded by Michael Malone
Preceded by Carolyn Culliton	Head Writer of Another World (with Tom King); August 21, 1995-May 17, 1996	Succeeded by Margaret DePriest
Preceded by Margaret DePriest	Head Writer of Another World (with Tom King) (with Elizabeth Page: January 30, 1997 - March 21, 1997); January 30, 1997-April 18, 1997	Succeeded by Michael Malone
