= Another World (TV series) =

American soap opera

- Genre: Soap opera
- Created by: Irna Phillips; William J. Bell
- Starring: Series cast
- Theme music composer: Charles Paul (1964–75); Bob Israel (1975–81); Jonathan L. Segal (1981–87); John Loeffler & Ralph Dion Schuckett (1987–96); Dominic Messinger (1996–99)
- Opening theme: "Another World Theme" (1964–87 and 1996–99); (various separate themes used during the two timespans with this title); "(You Take Me Away To) Another World" (instrumental, 1987; performed by Crystal Gayle and Gary Morris, 1987–96)
- Country of origin: United States
- Original language: English
- No. of seasons: 35
- No. of episodes: 8,891

Production
- Executive producers: Allen M. Potter (1964–66, 1983–84); Doris Quinlan (March–July 1965); Paul Robert (1965–66); Mary Harris (1966–71); Lyle B. Hill (1969–71); Paul Rauch (1971–83); Stephen Schenkel (1985–86); John Whitesell (1986–88); Michael Laibson (1988–93); Terri Guarnieri (1993–94); John Valente (1994–95); Jill Farren Phelps (1995–96); Charlotte Savitz (1996–98); Christopher Goutman (1998–99)
- Running time: 30 minutes (1964–75); 60 minutes (1975–79, 1980–99); 90 minutes (1979–80)
- Production company: Procter and Gamble Productions

Original release
- Network: NBC
- Release: May 4, 1964 – June 25, 1999

Related
- As the World Turns; Guiding Light; Lovers and Friends; Search for Tomorrow

Another World is an American television soap opera that aired on NBC from May 4, 1964, to June 25, 1999. It was created by Irna Phillips along with William J. Bell, and was produced by Procter & Gamble Productions at NBC Studios, 1268 East 14th Street in Brooklyn.

Set in the fictional town of Bay City, the series originally opened with announcer Bill Wolff intoning its epigram, "We do not live in this world alone, but in a thousand other worlds," (Note: Derived from a quote by John Keats: "I feel more and more every day, as my imagination strengthens, that I do not live in this world alone, but in a thousand worlds.") which Phillips said represented the difference between "the world of events we live in, and the world of feelings and dreams that we strive for." Another World focused less on the conventional drama of domestic life as seen in other soap operas, and more on exotic melodrama between families of different classes and philosophies.

In 1964, Another World was the first soap opera to talk about abortion when such subjects were taboo. It was the first soap opera to do a crossover, with the character of Mike Bauer from Guiding Light, which was also created by Irna Phillips, coming from Springfield to Bay City. It was also the first to expand to one hour, then to ninety minutes, and then back to an hour. It was the first soap opera to launch two spin-offs, Somerset and Texas, as well as an indirect one, Lovers and Friends, which would be renamed For Richer, For Poorer. Another World was also the second soap opera with a theme song to chart on the Billboard record charts, "(You Take Me Away To) Another World" by Crystal Gayle and Gary Morris, in 1987.

On April 12, 1999, NBC announced it was canceling Another World. Its final episode aired on June 25, 1999. It was replaced with another soap opera, Passions, on July 5, 1999.

== Development ==
Another World's best-known title sequence, seen from June 1966 to September 4, 1981, making it one of the longest-running continuous title sequences on television.

In 1963, NBC approached PGP about Irna Phillips creating a new serial for them. She decided to base it on the concept of living not only in real life, but simultaneously living in an alternate world of hopes and desires. Attorney Mitchell Dru (played by Geoffrey Lumb), who had previously been a character on As the World Turns, became a character on Another World during the early years of the program (1964–1971). Two characters from another CBS soap opera, The Guiding Light—attorney Mike Bauer and his daughter Hope—did cross over in 1966, remaining for a year before returning to The Guiding Light. Expectations were so high that Another World had six weeks of commercial time sold in advance.

On November 22, 1963, a group of executives (including executive producer Allen M. Potter and director Tom Donovan) met at the VMLY&R ad agency in New York to discuss the show's opening story, the death of William Matthews, when they heard the news of another death in Dallas: the assassination of President Kennedy.

After opening with a death in the core Matthews family, Irna planned to follow up with an out-of-wedlock pregnancy, a septic abortion, a shooting, and a murder trial. As Allen M. Potter explained, "Irna just didn't want to take a chance on waiting for the ratings. She felt that with this kind of showy story she could build an audience more quickly." Said Tom Donovan, "In construction, Irna was attempting to follow the structure of As the World Turns. Irna would never conceive of a story not based on a family."

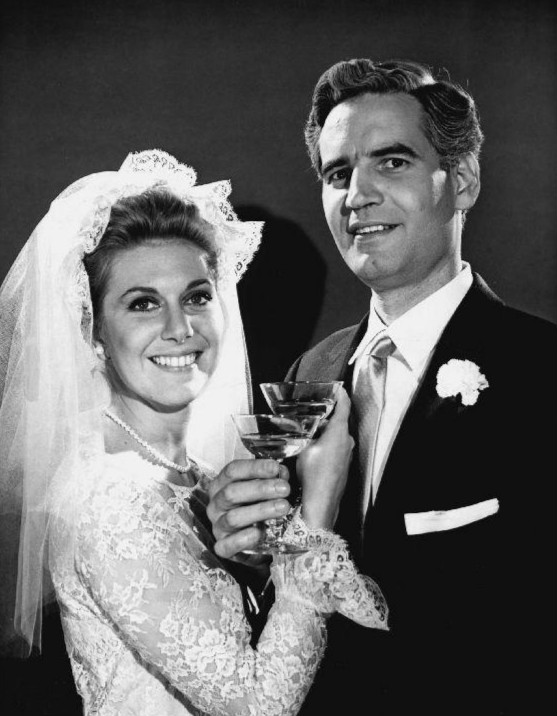
John and Pat are married, 1965.

== Cancellation ==
On April 12, 1999, as part of a shakeup of the network's daytime and early morning schedules (in which NBC also canceled NBC News at Sunrise (with newcomer Early Today replacing it as the network's early-morning newscast) and picked up the daytime talk show Later Today (a short-lived spinoff of Today) in exchange for the withdrawal of the talk show Leeza (which was renewed for the 1999–2000 season and subsequently sold into first-run syndication) from the network's schedule), NBC announced that it would not renew Another World, ending the series' run after 35 years once the show's previous renewal agreement ended that June. Many reasons abounded for Another World's cancellation, with one of the more notable events occurring in the summer of 1998: the network's San Francisco affiliate at the time, KRON-TV (now a CW owned-and-operated station)—at the time one of NBC's highest-rated stations—stopped airing the show altogether to air the syndicated Howie Mandel Show in its timeslot, leaving Days of Our Lives and Sunset Beach as the only NBC soap operas that the station cleared on its schedule, and resulting in additional erosion of the program's already below-mediocre ratings. Independent station KICU-TV picked up the show and aired it for the rest of its run (with NBC logo bugs and end-credit vocal network promotions removed), but the series still experienced a steep ratings decline in the Bay Area market as KRON refused to guide viewers to the program's new home.

== Cast ==
Actor	Character	Duration
David Ackroyd	Dave Gilchrist	1974–77
Mason Adams	Frank Prescott	1976–77
Denise Alexander	Mary McKinnon	1986–89, 1991
Vera Allen	Grandma Matthews	1964
Christopher Allport	Tim McGowan	1973–74
Christine Andreas	Taylor Benson	1990–91
Gerald Anthony	Rick Madison	1991–92
John Aprea	Lucas Castigliano	1989–93
John Aprea	Alexander Nikos	1997–98
Elizabeth Ashley	Emma Frame Ordway	1990
Lewis Arlt	David Thatcher	1983–84
Lewis Arlt	Ken Jordan	1990–91
Humbert Allen Astredo	Joe Bruno	1970
Richard Backus	Ted Bancroft	1979
David Bailey	Russ Matthews	1973–81, 1989, 1992
Christine Baranski	Beverly Tucker	1983
Joseph Barbara	Joe Carlino	1995–99
Judith Barcroft	Lenore Moore	1966–71
Judith Barcroft	Pharmacist	1988
Margaret Barker	Leueen Parrish	1978–79
Alice Barrett	Frankie Frame	1989–96, 1999
Alice Barrett	Anne O'Donnell	1999
Brad Bedford	Jamie Frame	1972–73
Richard Bekins	Jamie Frame	1979–83
Doris Belack	Madge Murray	1966–68
Joy Bell	Caroline Stafford	1988–91
Barbara Berjer	Bridget Connell	1985–98
Jack Betts	Louis St. George	1982–83
Theodore Bikel	Henry Davenport	1982–83
Pamela Blair	Bonnie Broderick	1994
Stephen Bogardus	Sandy Cory	1993
John Bolger	Gabe McNamara	1995–97
Laura Bonarrigo	Lindsay	1991
Jay Bontatibus	Russell Boyd	1996
Linda Borgeson	Alice Matthews Frame	1981–82
Carla Borelli	Reena Bellman	1979–80
Jennifer Bransford	Pamela	1982
Lisa Brenner	Maggie Cory	1995–96
Jacqueline Brookes	Beatrice Gordon	1975–76
Anne Rose Brooks	Diana Frame Shea	1981–82
Randy Brooks	Marshall Lincoln Kramer III	1994–95
Gail Brown	Clarice Hobson Ewing	1975–86
Kimberlin Brown	Shelly Clark	1999
Kale Browne	Michael Hudson	1986–93, 1995–98
Chris Bruno	Dennis Wheeler	1991–93
Jensen Buchanan	Marley Hudson	1991–94, 1997–98
Jensen Buchanan	Vicky Hudson	1991–99
Richard Burgi	Chad Rollo	1986–88
Warren Burton	Jason Dunlap	1980–82
Jordi Caballero	Pedro	1993
Jane Cameron	Nancy McGowan	1984–87, 1989, 1993
David Canary	Steve Frame	1981–83
John Capodice	Luigi	1987
Amy Carlson	Josie Watts Sinclair	1993–98
Kevin Carrigan	Derek Dane	1989–90
Gabrielle Carteris	Tracy Julian	1988
Justin Chambers	Nick Hudson	1995
Liza Chapman	Janet Matthews	1964–66
Jordan Charney	Sam Lucas	1967–70, 1973–74
Hank Cheyne	Scott LaSalle	1986–88
Robin Christopher	Lorna Devon	1994–97
Charles Cioffi	Kirk Laverty	1979
Brent Collins	Wallingford	1984–88
Kevin Conroy	Jerry Grove	1980–81
John Considine	Vic Hastings	1974–76
John Considine	Reginald Love	1986–88
Alicia Coppola	Lorna Devon	1991–94
Nicolas Coster	Robert Delaney	1970, 1972–76, 1979–80
Jacqueline Courtney	Alice Matthews Frame	1964–75, 1984–85, 1989
Christopher Cousins	Greg Houston	1986–87
Matt Crane	Matthew Cory	1988–99
Steven Culp	Tom Nelson	1982
John Cunningham	Dr. Dan Shearer	1970–71
Russell Curry	Carter Todd	1984–86
Augusta Dabney	Laura Baxter	1964–65
Patti D'Arbanville	Christy Carson	1992–93
Irene Dailey	Liz Matthews	1974–86, 1987–94
Leora Dana	Sylvie Kosloff	1978–79
Linda Dano	Felicia Gallant	1983–99
Terry Davis	Stacey Winthorp	1982–84
Wanda De Jesus	Gomez	1986
Judy Dewey	Blaine Ewing Cory	1984–85
Colleen Dion	Brett Gardener	1992–94
Robert Doran	Jamie Frame	1973–78
James Douglas	Eliot Carrington	1972–74
Val Dufour	Walter Curtin	1967–72
Carmen Duncan	Iris Wheeler	1988–94
Charles Durning	Gil McGowan	1972
Virginia Dwyer	Mary Matthews	1964–75
Hilary Edson	Stacey Winthrop	1989–91
Robert Emhardt	Mac Cory	1973–74
Tom Eplin	Jake McKinnon	1985–86, 1988–99
William Gray Espy	Mitch Blake	1979–82, 1986–90
Judi Evans	Paulina Cory Carlino	1991–99
Sandra Ferguson	Amanda Cory Sinclair	1987–93, 1998–99
Jose Ferrer	Reuben Moreno	1983
John (Jerry) Fitzpatrick	Willis Frame	1975–76
Steve Fletcher	Hank Kent	1992–94
Ann Flood	Rose Livingston	1986–87
Constance Ford	Ada Lucas Hobson	1967–92
Faith Ford	Julia Shearer	1983–84
David Forsyth	John Hudson	1987–97
Nancy Frangione	Cecile DePoulignac	1981–84, 1986, 1989, 1993, 1995–96
Elizabeth Franz	Alma Rudder	1982–83
Morgan Freeman	Roy Bingham	1982–84
Ed Fry	Adam Cory	1986–89
Sharon Gabet	Brittany Peterson	1985–87
Joseph Gallison	Bill Matthews	1964–69
Priscilla Garita	Kathy Wolikowski	1993
Robert Gentry	Philip Lyons	1979–81
Timothy Gibbs	Gary Sinclair	1995–98
Thomas Gibson	Sam Fowler	1990
Joanna Going	Lisa Grady	1987–89
Ricky Paull Goldin	Dean Frame	1990–93, 1995, 1998
James Goodwin	Kevin Anderson	1991–93
Elain R. Graham	Etta Mae Burrell	1996–99
Kelsey Grammer	Dr Canard	1982
Charles Grant	Evan Frame	1988–90
Micki Grant	Peggy Nolan	1965–72
Brian Lane Green	Sam Fowler	1991–93
Cathy Greene	Sally Ewing	1975–78
Kim Morgan Greene	Nicole Love	1983–84
Thomas Ian Griffith	Catlin Ewing	1984–87
Robyn Griggs	Maggie Cory	1993–95
Sam Groom	Russ Matthews	1966–71
Sam Groom	Jacob McAllister	1999
Troy Hall	Tito Banacek	1998–99
Mike Hammett	Dennis Wheeler	1972–78
Jennifer Harmon	Judge Trullinger	1993
Susan Harney	Alice Matthews Frame	1975–79
Harriet Sansom Harris	Cathy Harris	1983
Steve Richard Harris	Zak Wilder	1998–99
Jackée Harry	Lily Mason	1983–86
Edmund Hashim	Wayne Addison	1969
Anne Heche	Marley Love	1987–91
Anne Heche	Vicky Hudson	1987–91
David Hedison	Spencer Harrison	1991–96, 1999
Laurie Heineman	Sharlene Hudson	1975–77
Alice Hirson	Marsha Davis	1970
Robert Hogan	Vince McKinnon	1987–89, 1991
Anna Kathryn Holbrook	Sharlene Frame Hudson	1988–91, 1993–97, 1999
Seth Holzlein	Jamie Frame	1970
Tim Holcomb	Jamie Frame	1978–79
Kaitlin Hopkins	Kelsey Harrison	1992–94
James Horan	Denny Hobson	1981–82
Allison Hossack	Olivia Matthews	1989–92
Robert Hover	Russ Mathews	1971–72
Anne Marie Howard	Nicole Love	1987–89, 1993
Tresa Hughes	Emma Frame Ordway	1975–76
Michelle Hurd	Dana Kramer	1991–97
Sarah Hyland	Rain Wolfe	1997–98
Maggie Impert	Rachel Cory Hutchins	1971–72
Clifton James	Striker Bellman	1979–80
B.J. Jefferson	Ronnie Lawrence	1988–91
Barry Jenner	Evan Webster	1976–77
Georgann Johnson	Ellen Bishop Grant	1970
Christine Jones	Amy Gifford	1977
Christine Jones	Janice Frame Cory	1978–80, 1989
John Karlen	Casey	1970
Billy Kay	Jeremy	1998
Charles Keating	Carl Hutchins	1983–85, 1991–99
Susan Keith	Cecile DePoulignac	1979–81
Robert Kelker-Kelly	Sam Fowler	1987–90
Robert Kelker-Kelly	Shane Roberts	1996–98
Mary Page Keller	Sally Frame Ewing	1983–85
Ted King	Ron Nettles	1993
Charles Kimbrough	Dr. Abbott	1988
Maeve Kinkead	Angie Perrini	1977–80
Christopher Knight	Leigh Hobson	1980–81
Alla Korot	Jenna Norris	1991–93
Jane Krakowski	Tonya	1989
Brian Krause	Matthew Cory	1997–98
Ilene Kristen	Madeline Thompson	1995
Eriq La Salle	Charles Thompson	1987
Sofia Landon Geier	Jennifer Thatcher	1983
Sofia Landon Geier	Donna Love	1990–91, 1993
Laurie Landry	Nicole Love	1986–1987
Laurence Lau	Jamie Frame	1986–1990
Kathleen Layman	M.J. McKinnon	1984–1986
Jennifer Leak	Olive Randolph	1976–1979
Mark Lenard	Dr. Ernest Gregory	1964–1965
Rosetta LeNoire	Gloria Metcalf	1972
Rhonda Lewin	Vicky Hudson	1986
Tom Ligon	Ted Briar	1990
Jennifer Lien	Hannah Moore	1991–92
Audra Lindley	Liz Matthews	1964–69
Ray Liotta	Joey Perrini	1978–81
Cleavon Little	Captain Hancock	1982
John Littlefield	Gary Sinclair	1998–99
Lindsay Lohan	Alli Fowler	1996–97
Mitch Longley	Byron Pierce	1991–92
Geoffrey Lumb	Mitchell Dru	1964–71
Robert LuPone	Neal Cory	1985–86
Dorothy Lyman	Gwen Parish Frame	1976–80, 1989
Carol Lynley	Judge Martha Dunlay	1989
David Andrew Macdonald	Jordan Stark	1998–99
Elizabeth MacRae	Gertrude Beaudine	1980
Elizabeth MacRae	Aunt Rose	1988
William H. Macy	Frank Fisk	1982
Laura Malone	Blaine Ewing Cory	1978–84
Kristen Marie	Cheryl McKinnon	1986–88
Daniel Markel	Sam Fowler	1990–91
Hugh Marlowe	Jim Matthews	1969–82
Ben Masters	Vic Strang	1982
Patricia Mauceri	Angie Perrini	1976–77
Donald May	Grant Wheeler	1982
Kevin McClatchy	Nick Hudson	1995–96
Grayson McCouch	Morgan Winthrop	1993–96
Malachy McCourt	Priest	1989
John C. McGinley	Ned	1985–86
Maeve McGuire	Elena DePoulignac	1982–83
Beverlee McKinsey	Emma Frame Ordway	1972
Beverlee McKinsey	Iris Carrington	1972–80
Julian McMahon	Ian Rain	1993–95
Aiden McNulty	Jamie Frame	1972
Anne Meacham	Louise Goddard	1972–82
Stephen Mendillo	Policeman	1981
Stephen Mendillo	Hank	1992
Joanna Merlin	Dr. Emily Cole	1982
Joanna Merlin	Vivian Cory	1987
Taylor Miller	Sally Frame Ewing	1985–86
Mike Minor	Royal Dunning	1983–84
Mark Mortimer	Nick Hudson	1996–99
Joe Morton	Abel Marsh	1983–84
Joe Morton	Leo Mars	1983–84
Laura Moss	Amanda Cory Sinclair	1996–98
James Noble	Rev. Harris	1977
Christopher Noth	Dean Whitney	1988
David O'Brien	Alan Glaser	1986–87
Jodi Lyn O'Keefe	Maggie Cory	1995
Gretchen Oehler	Vivien Gorrow	1978–80, 1983–84, 1988–90
David Oliver	Perry Hutchins	1983–85
Julie Osburn	Kathleen McKinnon	1984–86, 1989, 1991, 1993
Beverley Owen	Paula McCrea	1971–72
Petronia Paley	Quinn Harding	1981–87
Lee Patterson	Kevin Cooke	1979–80
Pamela Payton-Wright	Hazel Parker	1979–80
Lisa Peluso	Lila Roberts	1997–99
Beverly Penberthy	Pat Matthews Randolph	1967–82, 1989
Luke Perry	Kenny	1988–89
Valarie Pettiford	Courtney Walker	1988–90
Wesley Ann Pfenning	Alice Matthews Frame	1979
Jeff Phillips	Matthew Cory	1998
Julie Phillips	Sally Frame Ewing	1979–80
James Pickens, Jr.	Zack Edwards	1986–90
Christina Pickles	Elena DePoulignac	1977–79
Mark Pinter	Grant Harrison	1991–99
John Pititto	Manny	1990–93
Brad Pitt	Chris	1987
Rick Porter	Larry Ewing	1978–86, 1989
Jim Poyner	Dennis Carrington Wheeler	1978–80
Clayton Prince	Reuben Lawrence	1988–90
William Prince	Ken Baxter	1964–65
Nicholas Pryor	Tom Baxter	1964
Dack Rambo	Grant Harrison	1990–91
Luke Reilly	Ted Bancroft	1983–84
George Reinholt	Steve Frame	1968–75, 1989
Ving Rhames	Czaja Carnek	1986
Kim Rhodes	Cindy Brooke	1996–99
Christopher Rich	Sandy Cory	1981–85
Joan Rivers	Meredith Dunston	1997
Eric Roberts	Ted Bancroft	1977
Chris Robinson	Jason Frame	1987–89
Barbara Rodell	Lee Randolph	1967–69
Michael Rodrick	Cameron Sinclair	1998–99
Howard Rollins	Ed Harding	1982
Julius La Rosa	Renaldo	1980
Rhonda Ross Kendrick	Toni Burrell	1997–99
Carol Roux	Melissa Matthews	1964–70
Hansford Rowe	Louis Washburn	1981
Jennifer Runyon	Sally Frame Ewing	1981–83
William Russ	Burt McGowan	1977–78
Leon Russom	Willis Frame	1976–80
Jack Ryland	Vince McKinnon	1984–85
Michael M. Ryan	John Randolph	1964–79
Gary Sandy	Michael Thayer	1969
Carlos Sanz	Victor Rodriguez	1993–94
Ruben Santiago-Hudson	Billy Cooper	1990–93
Dahlia Salem	Sofia Carlino	1995–98
Philece Sampler	Donna Love Hudson	1987–89
John Saxon	Edward Gerald	1985–86
Don Scardino	Chris Chapin	1985–86
Stephen Schnetzer	Cass Winthrop	1982–99
Fred J. Scollay	Charley Hobson	1977–80
Kyra Sedgwick	Julia Shearer	1982–83
Robert Sedgwick	Hunter Bradshaw	1984–85
Diego Serrano	Tomas Rivera	1994–97
Ted Shackelford	Ray Gordon	1975–77
Jonathan Sharp	Sergei Radzinsky	1999
Carole Shelley	Iris Wheeler	1980
Charles Siebert	Stuart Philbin	1972
Henry Simmons	Tyrone Montgomery	1997–99
Joseph Siravo	Barry Denton	1994
Tina Sloan	Dr. Olivia Delaney	1980–81
Marcus Smythe	Peter Love	1985–87
Sally Spencer	M.J. McKinnon	1986–87
Taylor Stanley	Remy Woods	1998–99
Helen Stenborg	Helga Lindeman	1977–78
Nadine Stenovitch	Josie Watts Sinclair	1998–99
Frances Sternhagen	Jane Overstreet	1971
Paul Stevens	Brian Bancroft	1977–85
Rich Stevens	Himself	1987–89
Robin Strasser	Rachel Cory Hutchins	1967–72
Duke Stroud	Vince McKinnon	1986
Shepperd Strudwick	Jim Matthews	1964–69
Anna Stuart	Donna Love Hudson	1983–86, 1989–99
Eric Morgan Stuart	Chris Madison	1996–99
Susan Sullivan	Lenore Moore	1971–75
Dolph Sweet	Gil McGowan	1972–77
Robin Thomas	Mark Singleton	1983–85
Victoria Thompson	Janice Frame Cory	1972–74
Jonathan Tiersten	Kid With Basketball	1981
Cali Timmins	Paulina Cory Carlino	1990–91
Russell Todd	Jamie Frame	1990–93
Gary Tomlin	Morgon Simpson	1979
Patrick Tovatt	Zane Lindquist	1985–86
Joey Trent	Russ Matthews	1964–65
Susan Trustman	Pat Matthews Randolph	1964–67
Vana Tribbey	Alice Matthews Frame	1981
Christine Tucci	Amanda Cory Sinclair	1993–95
Janine Turner	Patricia Kirkland	1986–87
Michael Tylo	Lord Peter Belton	1980
Mark Valley	Father Pete	1993
Paul Michael Valley	Ryan Harrison	1990–97
Paul Wasilewski	Sean McKinnon	1999
Cynthia Watros	Vicky Hudson	1998
Douglass Watson	Mac Cory	1974–89
Ann Wedgeworth	Lahoma Lucas	1967–70
Ellen Wheeler	Marley Love	1984–86, 1998–99
Ellen Wheeler	Vicky Hudson	1985–86
Betty White	Brenda Barlowe	1988
Persia White	K.C. Burrell	1999
Nancy Wickwire	Liz Matthews	1969–71
Kathleen Widdoes	Rose Perrini	1978–80
Kate Wilkinson	Clara Hudson	1987–89
Murial Williams	Helen Moore	1965–68, 1970–76
Alicia Leigh Willis	Alexandra Fowler	1999
Alexandra Wilson	Josie Watts Sinclair	1988–91
Henry Winkler	Intern	1972
Eric Scott Woods	Evan Frame	1994–95
Victoria Wyndham	Rachel Cory Hutchins	1972–99
Victoria Wyndham	Justine Duvalier	1995, 1997
Stephen Yates	Jamie Frame	1983–85

== Spin-offs ==
The show spawned two spin-offs: Somerset (1970–1976) and Texas (1980–1982). (In 1970, the two shows were known as Another World: Bay City and Another World: Somerset before reverting to their unique names.) One primetime special aired in 1992: Another World: Summer Desire.

A "viewer-directed," text-based continuation of the series called Another World Today existed online, initially sanctioned by TeleNext Media, the production arm of Procter & Gamble.

== Airtimes ==
While individual NBC affiliates had the right to air any show whenever they wished, most of the affiliates aired the show when it would be transmitted to the network's direct affiliates.

In 1975, Another World became the first soap opera to standardize an hour-long episode. On March 5, 1979, the show moved to 90 minutes, making it the first US soap opera to do so. The show moved back to 60 minutes on August 1, 1980.

In the mid-to-late 1990s, when Another World was in its final ratings slump, many affiliates swapped Another World's time slot with Days of Our Lives, which usually aired an hour earlier. Other affiliates transferred Another World to their morning schedule. One station, KXAS, aired Another World on a different local channel (KXTX) that had a programming and promotion agreement with KXAS, for a time in the late 1990s.

The network aired the show at the following times throughout its history:

- May 4, 1964 to January 3, 1975: 3:00–3:30 p.m.
- January 6, 1975 to March 2, 1979: 3:00–4:00 p.m.
- March 5, 1979 to August 1, 1980: 2:30–4:00 p.m.
- August 4, 1980 to June 25, 1999: 2:00–3:00 p.m.

== Theme songs ==
A number of theme songs were used throughout the run of the series. The most sustained was "(You Take Me Away to) Another World," which was performed by Crystal Gayle and Gary Morris. The song was used from 1987 to 1996.

Morris's and Gayle's song was only the second daytime serial theme to become a chart hit; released as a country pop single in 1987, it rose to number 4 on the Billboard Hot Country Singles chart. (The first was "Nadia's Theme" from The Young and the Restless, which had charted on the Billboard Hot 100 in 1976.)

== Notable alumni ==
Many well-known film and television actors and celebrities appeared on Another World early in their careers:

- Scott Bakula (Quentin Mills)
- Christine Baranski (Beverly Tucker)
- Laurie Bartram (Karen Campbell)
- Chris Bruno (Dennis Wheeler)
- Amy Carlson (Josie Watts)
- Gabrielle Carteris (Tracy Julian)
- Justin Chambers (Nick Hudson)
- Alicia Coppola (Lorna Devon)
- Marcia Cross (Tanya)
- Faith Ford (Julia Shearer)
- Morgan Freeman (Roy Bingham)
- Marcus Giamatti (Jeff)
- Joanna Going (Lisa Grady)
- Kelsey Grammer (Dr. Canard)
- Thomas Ian Griffith (Catlin Ewing)
- Jackeé Harry (Lily Mason)
- Anne Heche (Marley Hudson / Vicky Hudson)
- Ruben Santiago-Hudson (Billy Cooper)
- Sarah Hyland (Rain Wolfe)
- Michael Jeter (Arnie Gallo)
- Mary Page Keller (Sally Frame)
- Charles Kimbrough (Dr. Abbott)
- Christopher Knight (Leigh Hobson)
- Jane Krakowski (Tonya)
- Eriq LaSalle (Charles Thompson)
- Matt Lauer (art gallery patron)
- Audra Lindley (Liz Matthews)
- Ray Liotta (Joey Perrini)
- Lindsay Lohan (Alli Fowler)
- Dorothy Lyman (Gwen Parrish Frame)
- Wendie Malick (henchwoman)
- Terrence Mann (Griffen Sanders)
- Nancy Marchand (Irene Kimbalt / Therrese Lamonte)
- Hugh Marlowe (Jim Matthews)
- Rue McClanahan (Caroline Johnson)
- John C. McGinley (Ned Barry)
- Nancy McKeon (birthday party guest)
- Julian McMahon (Ian Rain)
- Debra Messing (Daisy)
- Donna Murphy (Morgan Graves)
- James Noble (Rev. Harris)
- Chris Noth (Jimmy / Dean Whitney)
- Jodi Lyn O'Keefe (Maggie Cory)
- Ed O'Neill (Lenny)
- Paul Perri (Joey Perrini)
- Luke Perry (Kenny)
- James Pickens, Jr. (Zack Edwards)
- Brad Pitt (Chris)
- Billy Porter (Billy Rush)
- Ving Rhames (Czaja Carnek)
- Christopher Rich (Sandy Cory)
- Kim Rhodes (Cindy Brooke)
- Eric Roberts (Ted Bancroft)
- William Converse-Roberts (Blue)
- Howard E. Rollins, Jr. (Ed Harding)
- Gary Sandy (Michael Thayer)
- Don Scardino (Chris Chapin)
- Kyra Sedgwick (Julia Shearer)
- Ted Shackelford (Ray Gordon)
- Tony Shalhoub (Phillipe)
- Henry Simmons (Tyrone Montgomery)
- Jean Smart (bus passenger)
- Rena Sofer (Joyce Abernathy)
- John Spencer (Frank Julian)
- David Strathairn (Dave Wilcox)
- Susan Sullivan (Lenore Moore)
- Dolph Sweet (Gil McGowan)
- Janine Turner (Patricia Kirkland)
- Mark Valley (Father Pete)
- Paul Wesley (Sean McKinnon)
- Dondre Whitfield (Jesse Lawrence)
- Billy Dee Williams (asst. district attorney)

Others who were dayplayers or extras included: Dan Futterman, Zach Grenier, Melissa Joan Hart, Frankie Muniz, Donna Pescow, Reginald VelJohnson, and Ming-Na Wen.

- Elizabeth Ashley (Emma Frame Ordway)
- Atlantic Starr (themselves)
- Theodore Bikel (Henry Davenport)
- Charles Durning (Gil McGowan)
- Dick Cavett (Oliver Twist (a magician))
- Jose Ferrer (attorney Reuben Marino)
- Roberta Flack (herself)
- Crystal Gayle (herself)
- Anita Gillette (Loretta Shea)
- Virginia Graham (herself)
- Donna Hanover (Judge Ellen Landregan)
- David Hedison (Spencer Harrison)
- Liberace (himself)
- Darlene Love (Judy Burrell)
- Marla Maples (dinner date)
- Ronnie Milsap (himself)
- Michael Minor (Royal Dunning)
- Gary Morris (himself)
- Dack Rambo (Grant Harrison)
- Joan Rivers (Meredith Dunston)
- Al Roker (himself)
- John Saxon (Edward Gerard)
- Alexander Scourby (Lowell Pendleton)
- Ann Sheridan (Kathryn Corning)
- Betty White (Brenda Barlowe)
- Chely Wright (herself)

== Accolades ==
Another World was nominated for sixty-nine Emmy Awards across nineteen categories. It received nominations for Outstanding Drama Series four times, winning once. It received six nominations in the Outstanding Lead Actor in a Drama Series category, winning three times. For Outstanding Lead Actress in a Drama Series, it received thirteen nominations and secured three wins. For supporting roles, it received seven nominations in the category of Outstanding Supporting Actor in a Drama Series, with three nominations in the category of Outstanding Supporting Actress in a Drama Series, winning in 1996. Another World received three nominations for Outstanding Ingenue / Younger Actress in a Drama Series, two of which it won: Ellen Wheeler in 1986, and Anne Heche in 1991. Rhonda Ross Kendrick received the third nomination, in 1998.

It was also nominated in multiple technical categories. In 1974, it tied with The Young and the Restless for Outstanding Art Direction or Scenic Design. It was nominated in the category for Outstanding Costume Design for a Drama Series four times, winning thrice, with the win in 1990 being a tie with All My Children. It received nominations for Achievement in Technical Excellence in a Daytime Drama Series in 1979 and 1980, and a nomination for Oustanding Design in a Daytime Drama Series, also in 1980. The directing team of Another World received eight nominations in the category of Outstanding Directing in a Drama Series / Drama Series Directing Team, winning in 1992. It also received nominations in the category of Outstanding Hairstyling for a Drama Series four times, each of which it won. In 1995, it received nominations in both the Outstanding Music Direction and Composition for a Drama Series and Outstanding Original Song categories, both of which it won. In 2000, the show received another nomination for Outstanding Music Direction and Composition. The writing team for Another World was nominated in the category of Outstanding Writing in a Drama Series / Drama Series Writing Team six times, winning in 1975. The show's writing team was disqualified from winning the award in 1994 due to a submission error, though they had received a nomination.

Prior to the Daytime Emmy Awards being separated from the Primetime Emmy Awards, the show received a nomination in the category of Special Classification of Outstanding Individual Achievement in a Daytime Drama at the 24th Primetime Emmy Awards.

In 1993, Susan Strickler won the Directors Guild of America Award for Outstanding Directorial Achievement in Daytime Serials for episode 7022. The show has been nominated four times for the Writers Guild of America Award for Best Television Writing in Daytime Serials – in 1994, 1995, 1996, and 1998.

The show's theme song, "Another World", was nominated for a Grammy Award in the category of Best Country Vocal Duet in 1988.

Emmy awards and nominations
Year(s)	Category	Recipient(s)	Role(s)	Result	Ref.
1972	Special Classification of Outstanding Individual Achievement in a Daytime Drama	Technical director: John L. Coffey; Cameramen: Louis Gerrard; Gene Martin; Selwyn Reed		Nominated	
1974	Outstanding Art Direction or Scenic Design	Otis Riggs, Jr.		Tie with The Young and the Restless	
1974	Outstanding Costume Design	Lewis Brown		Nominated	
1975	Outstanding Drama Series	Executive producer: Paul Rauch; Producers: Mary E. Bonner; Joe Rothenberger; Creators: William J. Bell; Irna Phillips		Nominated	
1975	Outstanding Directing in a Drama Series	Ira Cirker		Nominated	
1975	Outstanding Writing in a Drama Series	Tom King; Charles Kozloff; Harding Lemay; Douglas Marland; Jan Merlin		Won	
1976	Outstanding Drama Series	Executive producer: Paul Rauch; Producers: Mary S. Bonner; Joe Rothenberger		Won	
1977	Outstanding Drama Series	Executive producer: Paul Rauch; Producers: Mary S. Bonner; Joe Rothenberger		Nominated	
1977	Outstanding Lead Actress in a Drama Series	Beverlee McKinsey	Iris Cory Carrington	Nominated	
1977	Outstanding Directing in a Drama Series	Ira Cirker		Nominated	
1977	Outstanding Writing in a Drama Series	Barry Berg; Kathy Callaway; Arthur Giron; Tom King; Harding Lemay; Jan Merlin; Peter Swet		Nominated	
1978	Outstanding Lead Actress in a Drama Series	Laurie Heineman	Sharlene Frame	Won	
1978	Outstanding Lead Actress in a Drama Series	Beverlee McKinsey	Iris Cory Carrington	Nominated	
1978	Outstanding Lead Actress in a Drama Series	Victoria Wyndham	Rachel Cory	Nominated	
1978	Outstanding Directing in a Drama Series	Ira Cirker		Nominated	
1979	Outstanding Lead Actress in a Drama Series	Irene Dailey	Liz Matthews	Won	
1979	Outstanding Lead Actress in a Drama Series	Beverlee McKinsey	Iris Cory Carrington	Nominated	
1979	Outstanding Lead Actress in a Drama Series	Victoria Wyndham	Rachel Cory	Nominated	
1979	Outstanding Directing in a Drama Series	Melvin Bernhardt; Ira Cirker; Robert Calhoun; Paul Lammers		Nominated	
1979	Achievement in Technical Excellence in a Daytime Drama Series	Technical Team		Nominated	
1980	Outstanding Drama Series	Executive producer: Paul Rauch; Producers: Mary S. Bonner; Robert Costello		Nominated	
1980	Outstanding Lead Actor in a Drama Series	Douglass Watson	Mac Cory	Won	
1980	Outstanding Lead Actress in a Drama Series	Beverlee McKinsey	Iris Cory Carrington	Nominated	
1980	Outstanding Supporting Actor in a Drama Series	Julius La Rosa	Reynoldo	Nominated	
1980	Outstanding Directing in a Drama Series	Melvin Bernhardt; Robert Calhoun; Ira Criker; Jack Hofsiss; Barnet Kellman; Andrew Weyman		Nominated	
1980	Achievement in Technical Excellence in a Daytime Drama Series	Technical directors: Steve Cimino; Frank DeRienzo; Frank Gaeta; Electronic camera: Carl Eckett; Wayne Norman; Olonzo Roberts; David Weinberg; Audio engineers: Philip Berge; Mel Hench; Video engineers: Arnold Dick; Harold Mofsen; Associate directors: Kevin Kelly; John Libretto; Videotape editors: Lloyd Campbell; John O'Connor; Music composer/director: Score Productions		Nominated	
1980	Oustanding Design in a Daytime Drama Series	Art director: Robert Franklin; Scenic Designers: Russell Christian; Richard Hankins; Lighting designers: Leo Farrenkopf; Maury Verschoore; Costume designer: Lewis Brown; Hair designer: Frank Rubertone; Make-up designer: Edward Jackson		Nominated	
1981	Outstanding Lead Actor in a Drama Series	Douglass Watson	Mac Cory	Won	
1983	Outstanding Supporting Actor in a Drama Series	Howard E. Rollins Jr.	Ed Harding	Nominated	
1984	Outstanding Supporting Actor in a Drama Series	Paul Stevens	Brian Bancroft	Nominated	
1984	Achievement in any area of Creative Technical Crafts - Directing	Ira Cirker		Nominated	
1984	Special Classification of Technical Achievement – Technical Direction / Electronic Camerawork	Noreen Falk		Nominated	
1985	Outstanding Writing in a Drama Series	David Cherrill; David Colson; Carolyn Culliton; Richard Culliton; Judith Donato; Lloyd Gold; Roger Newman; Francis Myers; Judith Pinsker; Samuel D. Ratcliffe; Cynthia Saltzman; Gary Tomlin		Nominated	
1986	Outstanding Ingenue in a Drama Series	Ellen Wheeler	Vicky Hudson; Marley Love	Won	
1986	Outstanding Younger Leading Man in a Daytime Drama Series	Don Scardino	Chris Chapin	Nominated	
1989	Outstanding Lead Actor in a Drama Series	Douglass Watson	Mac Cory	Nominated	
1989	Outstanding Supporting Actor in a Drama Series	David Forsyth	John Hudson	Nominated	
1989	Outstanding Drama Series Writing Team	David Colson; Carolyn Culliton; Fran Myers; Roger Newman; Donna J. Swajeski; Chris Whitesell		Nominated	
1989	Outstanding Costume Design for a Drama Series	Margarita Delgado; Charles Schoonmaker		Won	
1990	Outstanding Lead Actor in a Drama Series	Stephen Schnetzer	Cass Winthrop	Nominated	
1990	Outstanding Hairstyling for a Drama Series	Annette Bianco; Angel De Angelis; John Quaglia; Joyce Sica		Won	
1990	Outstanding Costume Design for a Drama Series	Margarita Delgado; Charles Schoonmaker		Tie with All My Children	
1991	Outstanding Young Actress in a Drama Series	Anne Heche	Vicky Hudson; Marley Love	Won	
1992	Outstanding Supporting Actor in a Drama Series	Charles Keating	Carl Hutchins	Nominated	
1992	Outstanding Supporting Actress in a Drama Series	Linda Dano	Felicia Gallant	Nominated	
1992	Outstanding Drama Series Directing Team	Janet Andrews; Casey Childs; Michael Eilbaum; Mary Madeiras; Bob Schwarz; Carol Sedwick; Susan Strickler		Won	
1992	Outstanding Hairstyling for a Drama Series	Annette Bianco; Angel De Angelis; John Quaglia; Joyce Sica		Won	
1993	Outstanding Lead Actress in a Drama Series	Linda Dano	Felicia Gallant	Won	
1993	Outstanding Supporting Actor in a Drama Series	Charles Keating	Carl Hutchins	Nominated	
1993	Outstanding Drama Series Directing Team	Janet Andrews; Casey Childs; Michael Eilbaum; Mary Madeiras; Bob Schwarz; Carol Sedwick; Susan Strickler		Nominated	
1993	Outstanding Hairstyling for a Drama Series	Annette Bianco; Angel De Angelis; John Quaglia; Joyce Sica		Won	
1994	Outstanding Lead Actor in a Drama Series	Charles Keating	Carl Hutchins	Nominated	
1994	Outstanding Lead Actress in a Drama Series	Linda Dano	Felicia Gallant	Nominated	
1994	Outstanding Drama Series Writing Team	Peter Brash; Lorraine Broderick; Craig Carlson; Sharon Epstein; Kathleen Kennedy; Kathleen Klein; Mimi Leahey; Victor Miller; Elizabeth Page; Judith Pinsker; Samuel D. Ratcliffe; Peggy Sloane; Janet Stampfl		Nominated	
1994	Outstanding Hairstyling for a Drama Series	Annette Bianco; Stanley Steve Hall; Joyce Sica		Won	
1994	Outstanding Costume Design for a Drama Series	Margarita Delgado; Charles Schoonmaker		Won	
1995	Outstanding Drama Series Directing Team	Janet Andrews; Michael Eilbaum; Linda Laundra; Mary Madeiras; Bob Schwarz; Carol Sedwick		Nominated	
1995	Outstanding Original Song	A. J. Gundell; Gloria Sklerov	"I Never Believed in Love"	Won	
1995	Outstanding Music Direction and Composition for a Drama Series	Wes Boatman; Ron Brawer; Barry De Vorzon; Ed Dzuback; Richard Hazard; John Henry; Susan-Beth Markowitz; Rick Rhodes; Robert Sands; Carole Severson-Weiss		Won	
1996	Outstanding Lead Actor in a Drama Series	Charles Keating	Carl Hutchins	Won	
1996	Outstanding Lead Actress in a Drama Series	Jensen Buchanan	Vicky Hudson; Marley Love	Nominated	
1996	Outstanding Lead Actress in a Drama Series	Linda Dano	Felicia Gallant	Nominated	
1996	Outstanding Supporting Actor in a Drama Series	David Forsyth	John Hudson	Nominated	
1996	Outstanding Supporting Actress in a Drama Series	Anna Holbrook	Sharlene Frame Hudson	Won	
1996	Outstanding Drama Series Writing Team	Shelly Altman; Peter Brash; Lorraine Broderick; Craig Carlson; Carolyn Culliton; Kathy Ebel; Sharon Epstein; Sofia Landon Geier; Janet Iacobuzio; Kathleen Kennedy; Tom King; Mimi Leahey; Harding Lemay; Michelle Poteet Lisanti; Victor Miller; Loren Segan; Elizabeth Page; Betsy Snyder; Chris Whitesell		Nominated	
1997	Outstanding Lead Actress in a Drama Series	Jensen Buchanan	Vicky Hudson; Marley Love	Nominated	
1998	Outstanding Supporting Actress in a Drama Series	Amy Carlson	Josie Watts	Nominated	
1998	Outstanding Younger Actress in a Drama Series	Rhonda Ross Kendrick	Toni Burrell	Nominated	
2000	Outstanding Music Direction and Composition for a Drama Series	Music directors: James Kowal; Pamela Magee; Composers: Wes Boatman; Mark Breeding; Barry De Vorzon; Ed Dzubak; Fred Hand; Richard Hazard; John Henry; Dominic Messinger; Chieli Minucci; Rick Rhodes; Robert Sands; Brian Siewert		Nominated	

Other notable awards and nominations
Ceremony	Category	Recipient(s)	Result	Ref.
1988 Grammy Awards	Best Country Vocal Duet	Crystal Gayle; Gary Morris; – for "Another World"	Nominated	
1993 Directors Guild of America Awards	Outstanding Directorial Achievement in Daytime Serials	Susan Strickler	Won	
1994 Writers Guild of America Awards	Best Television Writing in Daytime Serials	Peter Brash; Craig Carlson; Sharon Epstein; Janet Iacobuzio; Kathleen Kennedy; Lisa Kern; Kathleen Klein; Mimi Leahey; Matthew Lombardo; Victor Miller; Elizabeth Page; Judith Pinsker; Sam Ratcliffe; Peggy Sloane; Janet Stampfl	Nominated	

== Executive Producers / Head Writers ==
The following helmed Another World during its 35-year run:

Years	Executive Producer(s)	Head writer(s)
May 4, 1964 – March 16, 1965	Allen M. Potter	Irna Phillips with William J. Bell
March 17 – November 5, 1965	Doris Quinlan	James Lipton
November 8, 1965 – February 17, 1969	Paul Robert 1965–1966; Mary Harris 1966–1969	Agnes Nixon
February 18, 1969 – August 30, 1971	Mary Harris; Lyle B. Hill	Robert Cenedella
August 31, 1971 – May 11, 1979	Paul Rauch	Harding Lemay
May 14, 1979 – November 16, 1979	Paul Rauch	Tom King
November 19, 1979 – December 22, 1980	Paul Rauch	Tom King, Robert Soderberg
December 23, 1980 - November 6, 1981	Paul Rauch	L. Virginia Browne
November 9, 1981 – November 12, 1982	Paul Rauch	Corinne Jacker
November 15-26, 1982	Paul Rauch	Robert Soderberg
November 29, 1982 – December 23, 1983	Paul Rauch; Allen M. Potter	Robert Soderberg, Dorothy Ann Purser
December 26, 1983 – February 29, 1984	Allen M. Potter	Dorothy Ann Purser
March 1 – June 29, 1984	Allen M. Potter	Richard Culliton
July 2, 1984 – January 4, 1985	Allen M. Potter	Richard Culliton, Gary Tomlin
January 7 – July 31, 1985	Stephen Schenkel	Gary Tomlin
August 1, 1985 – March 26, 1986	Stephen Schenkel, John Whitesell	Sam Hall, Gillian Spencer
March 27, 1986 – January 15, 1988	John Whitesell	Margaret DePriest
January 18 – April 15, 1988	John Whitesell; Michael Laibson	Sheri Anderson
April 18 – September 9, 1988	Michael Laibson	Donna Swajeski (WGA Strike)
September 12, 1988 – November 10, 1988	Michael Laibson	Harding Lemay
November 11, 1988 – November 27, 1992	Michael Laibson	Donna Swajeski
November 30, 1992 – November 18, 1994	Michael Laibson; Terri Guarnieri; John Valente	Peggy Sloane, Samuel D. Ratcliffe
November 21, 1994 – August 18, 1995	John Valente; Jill Farren Phelps	Carolyn Culliton
August 21, 1995 – May 17, 1996	Jill Farren Phelps	Tom King, Craig Carlson
May 20, 1996 – January 29, 1997	Jill Farren Phelps; Charlotte Savitz	Margaret DePriest
January 30 – March 14, 1997	Charlotte Savitz	Elizabeth Page, Tom King, Craig Carlson
March 17 – April 18, 1997	Charlotte Savitz	Tom King, Craig Carlson
April 21 – December 26, 1997	Charlotte Savitz	Michael Malone
December 29, 1997 – May 22, 1998	Charlotte Savitz	Richard Culliton
May 25 – July 6, 1998	Charlotte Savitz	Richard Culliton, Jean Passanante
July 7-23, 1998	Charlotte Savitz	Jean Passanante
July 24, 1998 – June 25, 1999	Charlotte Savitz; Christopher Goutman	Leah Laiman, Jean Passanante

== On location tapings ==
Another World production left the studio to film exterior scenes several times. Some of these locations included:

- Arizona, United States
- Central Park, Manhattan, New York, United States
- Lake Louise, Banff National Park, Alberta, Canada
- Mallorca, Spain
- New York (state), United States
- Saint Croix, U.S. Virgin Islands
- Wyoming, United States

== Pop culture references ==
In the progressive rock band Pink Floyd's 1979 album The Wall, in the intro to the song "One of My Turns", the main character to the album Pink, is heard watching Another World while Valley girl, played by Trudy Young tries to converse with Pink.

In Pink Floyd – The Wall, the sounds of Another World are replaced with The Dam Busters.

== See also ==
- List of Another World characters

== Bibliography ==
- Kaplan, Mike, ed. (1989). Variety's Directory of Major U.S. Show Business Awards. New York: R.R. Bowker. ISBN 0-8352-2666-2. LCCN 84018734 – via Internet Archive.
- Keats, John (1969). Milnes, Lord Houghton, Richard Monckton (ed.). The life and letters of John Keats (Reprinted ed.). London: Dent [u.a.] p. 141. ISBN 0460008013 – via Internet Archive.
- Lackmann, Ron (1976). Soap Opera Almanac. New York: Berkley Publishing Corporation. ISBN 0-425-03234-5.
- LaGuardia, Robert (September 1974). The Wonderful World of TV Soap Operas. New York: Ballantine Books. ISBN 0-345-25482-1 – via Internet Archive.
- O'Neil, Thomas (July 2000). The Emmys: The Ultimate, Unofficial Guide to the Battle of TV's Best Shows and Greatest Stars (3rd ed.). New York: Penguin Putnam. ISBN 0-399-52611-0 – via Internet Archive.
- Poll, Julie (April 27, 1999). Another World 35th Anniversary Celebration. HarperEntertainment. ISBN 0060193042.
- Waggett, Gerard J. (September 4, 1999). The Ultimate Another World Trivia Book. Renaissance Books. ISBN 1580630812.
