= Beverlee McKinsey =

American actress (1935–2008)

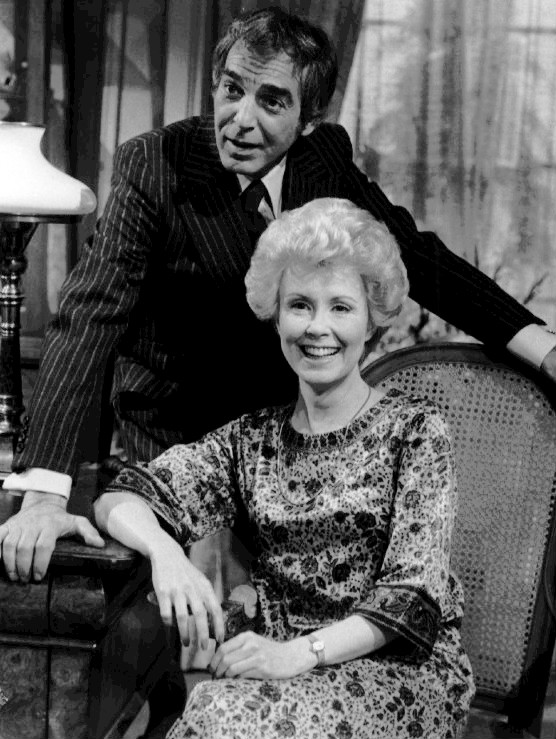
- McKinsey as Iris Carrington with Paul Stevens as Brian Bancroft on Another World, 1977
- Born: Beverlee Magruder; August 9, 1935; McAlester, Oklahoma, U.S.
- Died: May 2, 2008 (aged 72); Los Angeles, California, U.S.
- Occupation: Actress
- Years active: 1960–1994
- Spouse(s): Mark McKinsey (1956–1962; divorced); Angus Duncan (1963–1968); Berkeley Harris (1971 – September 17, 1984; by his death)
- Children: 1

Beverlee McKinsey (born Beverlee Magruder; August 9, 1935 – May 2, 2008) was an American actress. She is best known for her roles on daytime serials, including Iris Cory Carrington on Another World and the spin-off series Texas from 1972 to 1981 and Alexandra Spaulding on Guiding Light from 1984 to 1992.

== Early life ==
McKinsey was born Beverlee Magruder in McAlester, Oklahoma, on August 9, 1935. She was the daughter of Mr. and Mrs. Warren S. Magruder of Tulsa.

McKinsey graduated from the University of Oklahoma in 1956 with a degree in drama. She taught in schools in four states before she was married.

== Early career ==
In 1960, McKinsey was host of Make-Believe Clubhouse, a Monday-Friday afternoon children's program on WGBH-TV in Boston and WENH-TV in Durham, New Hampshire.

She understudied the leading role of newlywed Corie in the original Broadway production of Barefoot in the Park and was given the opportunity to perform the role opposite Robert Redford several times. She also co-starred as Honey in the London production of Who's Afraid of Virginia Woolf?, starring Uta Hagen and Arthur Hill. She started her career in off-Broadway theater, often appearing alongside James Earl Jones and Doris Belack. Her other work on Broadway included performing in Mert and Phil and being an understudy for Man and Boy.

McKinsey moved to Hollywood in the late 1960s, and after several appearances in episodic television shows, she appeared on daytime TV. She played Diana Martin, a reporter, on Love of Life, and was then cast in the contract role of Martha Donnelly/Julie Richards (1970–1971) on Love Is a Many Splendored Thing, where she worked with future husband, Berkeley Harris.

== Daytime television career ==
=== Iris Carrington ===
After a brief appearance as Emma Frame on Another World in May 1972, she so impressed then-head writer Harding Lemay that he subsequently cast her in a drastically different role, from dowdy Emma to that of manipulative, scheming Iris Carrington. McKinsey played the role from December 1972 to July 1980. During much of her tenure on Another World, McKinsey's portrayal of Iris was part of an unconventional triangle - the character was trying to break up her father Mackenzie Cory and his new wife, Rachel Davis Frame.

McKinsey was made the star of the soap's spin-off series, Texas, which debuted August 4, 1980. She remains one of three actors on daytime television to be given a star billing on a soap opera, the others being Rosemary Prinz of All My Children and How to Survive a Marriage, and Dana Andrews of Bright Promise and Macdonald Carey of Days Of Our Lives .

After McKinsey left the role of Iris in November 1981, NBC's Texas eventually lost one million viewers in the Nielsen ratings and was canceled in 1982.

McKinsey received four Daytime Emmy nominations for her work as Iris.

=== Alexandra Spaulding ===
After a hiatus from daytime, Gail Kobe, then executive producer of Guiding Light, lured McKinsey to Guiding Light, on CBS, in February 1984 in the newly created character of wealthy matriarch Baroness Alexandra Spaulding Von Halkein.

As Alexandra, McKinsey's initial work was portraying Alexandra's love for power and the desire to best brother Alan Spaulding, as well as to reclaim the affection, love, and approval of Lujack/Nick, her twin sons who were forcibly taken away from her at birth. Alexandra also cared deeply for her nephews, Phillip and Alan-Michael, but was irritated by Phillip's ex-wives, India and Blake.

While Alexandra could be a snob (and ruthless) at times, she also could let her hair down, as when she went bowling with then-beau H.B. Lewis (Larry Gates). Her ruthlessness was revealed when Alexandra married Roger Thorpe (Michael Zaslow), then subsequently discovered he was involved in an affair with the younger Mindy Lewis. The scene where Alexandra humiliates Roger in public at the country club is now considered a Guiding Light classic scene.

In 1992, McKinsey took advantage of an out in her contract, and abruptly left the show. Soap journalist Michael Logan wrote about the turn of events:

Interviewing McKinsey was a dream. There were never any "I just love everyone I work with" cliches. After she exited Guiding Light, McKinsey cited her "not very pleasant" work environment for one of the reasons she chose to leave the daytime serial. Looking at her contract, she discovered she could leave the show after every six-month period. So McKinsey took advantage of the contract the day before her annual eight-week vacation. McKinsey went on permanent vacation. McKinsey adamantly defended her choice to exit the show. Her bosses felt they had been bamboozled. "They're bent out of shape because, for once, somebody beat 'em at their own game," she said. "I had warned Jill (the show's then-executive producer Jill Farren Phelps) – although I don't think she paid attention to me – that I was not happy. I was not happy with the story line." She had confided in Phelps previously that she was frustrated enough to quit, and was told in response that perhaps she should read her contract.

McKinsey later quipped that perhaps Phelps and the rest of the Guiding Light production team were who should have read the contract. "They didn't read the contract! I read it very closely. I knew every word. The next day, they were all combing over the contract. Somebody said, 'Maybe Beverlee's not familiar with the contract.' Well, of course she was! She wrote it, you bozos. She wrote it! I've had this out clause since 1986. I asked for it and it was P&G that determined how much notice they wanted me to give – and they chose eight weeks."

In addition to her issues with storytelling, which she said would not have motivated her to leave if her working environment had been happier, McKinsey noted that acting had simply stopped being fun for her. "The hours just made me crazy. They were too long," she explained.

== Personal life ==
She was married three times, and had one son, Scott McKinsey from her marriage to Mark McKinsey. Her son is a director on the soap opera General Hospital (on which she briefly appeared in 1994).

After being married to Angus Duncan, McKinsey married Berkeley Harris, a co-star from Love Is a Many Splendored Thing, in 1971, and cared for him during his illness from terminal brain cancer prior to his death in 1984.

In 1994, she made a brief appearance as Myrna Slaughter on General Hospital. In an interview, she said she took the role to qualify for her medical insurance, but otherwise adamantly considered herself retired from soaps from that moment in 1992 when she last left the set of Guiding Light. She had resisted all entreaties to return to daytime television. After some health issues, including a kidney transplant, McKinsey retired to Southern California and made few public appearances.

== Death ==
Beverlee McKinsey died on May 2, 2008, at the Olympic Medical Center in Los Angeles, from complications due to a kidney transplant, which she had undergone in 1998.

== Filmography ==
=== Film ===
Film
Year	Title	Role	Notes
1969	They Shoot Horses, Don't They?	Dancer	Uncredited
1969	The Reivers	Girl by the Boon's Car	Uncredited
1980	Bronco Billy	Irene Lily	

=== Television ===
Television
Year	Title	Role	Notes
1964	The Reporter	Ann	Episode: "Murder by Scandal"
1965	The Doctors and the Nurses	Eileen Moore	Episode: "Where There's Smoke"
1965	The Defenders	Karen McDermott	Episode: "Only a Child"
1965	Seaway	Millie	Episode: "Shipment from Marseilles"
1966	Hawk	Mattie Mulroy	Episode: "War of Silence"
1968	The Second Hundred Years	Flo	Episode: "Love on the Double"
1969	Mannix	Carol Chase	Episode 13 (season 2): "Death Run"
1969; 1972	The Mod Squad	Claudine Ensign; Evelyn Ellis	Episode: "A Hint of Darkness, a Hint of Light"; Episode: "Another Final Game"
1969	The Virginian	Abby Clayton	Episode: "The Substitute"
1969	Hawaii Five-O	Jo Louise Mailer	Episode: "The Joker's Wild, Man, Wild!"
1970	Death Valley Days	Maud Gage Baum	Episode: "The Wizard of Aberdeen"
1970	The F.B.I.	Cathy Wheaton	Episode: "Summer Terror"
1970–1971	Love Is a Many Splendored Thing	Martha Donnelly / Julie Richards	Unknown episodes
1971	Longstreet	Sue Hazelton	Episode: "A World of Perfect Complicity"
1971	Medical Center	Beth	Episode: "The Shattered Man"
1971	McMillan & Wife	Laurie Forrest	Episode: "Husbands, Wives and Killers"
1972; 1972–1980	Another World	Emma Frame Ordway; Iris Wheeler	Unknown episodes
1972	The Delphi Bureau	Goldie	Episode: "The Man Upstairs-The Man Downstairs Project"
1973	Cannon	Rita Bell	Episode: "The Dead Samaritan"
1973	The ABC Afternoon Playbreak	Lorraine Collins	Episode: "The Other Woman"
1980–1981	Texas	Iris Wheeler	Unknown episodes
1983	The Demon Murder Case	Charlotte Harris	TV movie
1983	Remington Steele	Alexis Vandermeer	Episode: "Vintage Steele"
1984–1992	Guiding Light	Alexandra Spaulding	Unknown episodes
1994	General Hospital	Myrna Slaughter	Unknown episodes (final television appearance)

=== Theatre ===
Theatre
Year	Title	Role	Venue
1962	P.S. 193	Miss Nichols	Off-Broadway
1963	The Love Nest	Polly Seekfest	Off-Broadway
1963	Barefoot in the Park	Corie Bratter (replacement)	Broadway
1963	Man and Boy	Carol Penn (understudy); Countess Antonescu (understudy)	Broadway
1964	Who's Afraid of Virginia Woolf?	Honey	West End
1964	Dutchman	Lula (replacement)	Off-Broadway
1974	Mert & Phil	Lavoris	Broadway

== Awards and nominations ==
Year	Award	Category	Series	Result
1977	Daytime Emmy Awards	Outstanding Lead Actress in a Drama Series	Another World	Nominated
1977	Soapy Awards	Favorite Villainess	Another World	Won
1978	Daytime Emmy Awards	Outstanding Lead Actress in a Drama Series	Another World	Nominated
1978	Soapy Awards	Favorite Villainess	Another World	Won
1979	Daytime Emmy Awards	Outstanding Lead Actress in a Drama Series	Another World	Nominated
1980	Daytime Emmy Awards	Outstanding Lead Actress in a Drama Series	Another World	Nominated
1986	Soap Opera Digest Awards	Outstanding Actress in a Supporting Role on a Daytime Serial	Guiding Light	Nominated
1991	Soap Opera Digest Awards	Outstanding Lead Actress: Daytime	Guiding Light	Nominated
1992	Soap Opera Digest Awards	Outstanding Lead Actress: Daytime	Guiding Light	Nominated
1993	Soap Opera Digest Awards	Outstanding Lead Actress	Guiding Light	Nominated
