= Ellen Wheeler =

American actress, director and producer

- Born: Ellen Jayne Wheeler; October 9, 1961 (age 64); Glendale, California, U.S.
- Occupations: Actress, director, producer
- Years active: 1983–2009
- Spouse: Tom Eplin (m. 1985; div. 1988)

Ellen Jayne Wheeler (born October 9, 1961 in Glendale, California) is an American actress, director and producer. Her work, both on screen and in production, has been primarily in American daytime drama.

== Early life and career ==
Wheeler's parents both had a background in theater and entertainment; her father was an assistant director at MGM, while her mother was an actress. She was raised Mormon, and attended Brigham Young University to study acting.

Wheeler has appeared in several soap operas, including Another World and All My Children. In 1986, she won the Daytime Emmy Award for Outstanding Younger Actress in a Drama Series for her work as twins Marley and Vicky Love Hudson on Another World. In 1988, she won another Daytime Emmy for Outstanding Supporting Actress in a Drama Series for her work as Cindy Parker Chandler on All My Children. Wheeler's character was one of the first characters with AIDS on daytime television. Wheeler also made a memorable guest appearance as Phyllis Wicke in the 1991 primetime revival of the gothic soap opera Dark Shadows.

In 1996, she starred in the Star Trek: Deep Space Nine episode, "The Quickening".

In 1998, she briefly reprised the role of Marley on Another World. Rather than have the same actress play the role of both twins, the show made the decision to have Wheeler, the first actress to play the twins, portray Marley, and have actress Jensen Buchanan continue to play Vicky; their differences in appearance (other than a considerable height and build difference which were never addressed) were explained by plastic surgery after Marley was disfigured in a fire.

Wheeler was once married to her Another World costar, Tom Eplin. They were married during the time that their characters Vicky/Marley and Jake were involved.

== Directing and producing ==
During the final season of Another World, Wheeler drew on her stage directorial experience and was invited by AW's executive producer, Chris Goutman, to direct a few episodes of the show.

After the cancellation of Another World in 1999, she continued her focus on directing. While continuing to act, she directed several episodes of As the World Turns and finally became part of the directorial team at As the World Turns.

After two seasons with ATWT, Wheeler worked as an associate producer at another Procter & Gamble serial, Guiding Light. She returned to ATWT and directed episodes of the show for several years, until she was appointed executive producer of Guiding Light in April 2004, a position she would hold until the final episode of the show in September 2009. Under her direction, the show named a new head writer, David Kreizman, and in 2008, she created a four-person head writing team; in addition to Kreizman, that team includes Lucky Gold, Chris Dunn and executive story editor (and eventual head writer) Jill Lorie Hurst.

In response to budget cuts and changing production methods, Wheeler led Guiding Light's transition to a new filming method. The show moved away from traditional three-camera filming in a "proscenium" stage setting, and in early 2008 began to broadcast episodes that were recorded on digital cameras. The show rebuilt smaller, more realistic sets in its studio and utilized several other interior and exterior sets in a New Jersey town (adjacent to New York City, where GL is produced).

In 2007, Wheeler launched Guiding Light's 70th anniversary (the longest running show in history) by volunteering her cast and crew on a charity and service campaign known as "Find Your Light", encouraging viewers to participate alongside actors, directors and crew members in work for the homeless and other deserving groups and individuals across the country.

Despite Wheeler's efforts to save the show, CBS cancelled the program on April 1, 2009. The final episode was broadcast on September 18, 2009.

=== Glenn Beck collaboration ===
In 2015, Glenn Beck announced that Wheeler would join his team to help create and produce content.

== Personal life ==
Wheeler is a member of the Church of Jesus Christ of Latter-day Saints. As of April 2008, she was living with her husband and children in Utah.

== Roles ==
All My Children

- Actress: Cindy Parker Chandler (1987–1989, 2001) and Karen Parker (1989)

Another World

- Actress: Marley Love (1984—1986, 1998–1999) and Vicky Hudson (1985–1986)

The Bold and the Beautiful

- Actress: Sarah (1995; guest)

As the World Turns

- Director (August 1999-July 2002 (hired by Christopher Goutman), January 2003 – March 2004, February 4, 2010 – September 17, 2010)
- Actress: Marley Hudson (Cameos from 2000 to 2003)

Dark Shadows

- Actress: Phyllis Wicke (1991, five-episode guest appearance)

Guiding Light

- Executive Producer (March 16, 2004 – September 18, 2009)
- Head writer (March 2008 – April 2008)
- Producer (July 2002 – January 2003)

== Awards and nominations ==
- Daytime Emmy WIN (2007; Best Drama Series; Guiding Light)
- Daytime Emmy NOMINATION (2001-2003; Best Directing; As the World Turns)
- Daytime Emmy WIN (1988; Best Supporting Actress; All My Children)
- Daytime Emmy WIN (1986; Best Younger Actress; Another World)
