= Marley Love =

- Another World character
- Ellen Wheeler as Marley Love
- Portrayed by: Ellen Wheeler (1984–86, 1998–2003); Anne Heche (1987–91); Jensen Buchanan (1991–94, 1997–98)
- Duration: 1984–94; 1997–2003
- First appearance: May 14, 1984
- Last appearance: October 16, 2003
- Created by: Richard Culliton
- Introduced by: Stephen Schenkel (1984); Charlotte Savitz (1997); Christopher Goutman (1999)
- Crossover appearances: As the World Turns
In-universe information
- Other names: Marley McKinnon; Marley Hudson; Marnie Stone
- Father: Michael Hudson
- Mother: Donna Love
- Sisters: Vicky Hudson
- Half-brothers: Nicholas Hudson
- Spouse: Jake McKinnon (1986–89)
- Adoptive children: Bridget McKinnon; Michelle McKinnon
- Grandfathers: Reginald Love
- Grandmothers: Elizabeth Love; Clara Hudson
- Uncles: John Hudson; Peter Love; Scott LaSalle (adoptive)
- Aunts: Nicole Love
- Nephews: Steven Frame; Kirkland Harrison
- Nieces: Bridget McKinnon; Michelle McKinnon
- First cousins: Gregory Hudson

Marley Love is a fictional character from the NBC daytime soap opera Another World. After AW was cancelled, the character crossed over to the CBS daytime soap opera As the World Turns for guest appearances between 2000 and 2003.

== Storylines ==
Marley was born into the wealthy Love family and led a privileged life. Despite her upbringing, Marley was kind, modest, and shy. Neither did Marley know she had an identical twin sister Vicky Hudson and their biological parents were teenage sweethearts Michael Hudson and Donna Love. Vicky was placed for adoption while Marley grew up believing Donna's parents, Reginald and Elizabeth, were her parents and Donna was her sister. When she was very young, Elizabeth died and Reginald faked his death, leaving her to be raised by her "older siblings."

Peter Love was the first family member, introduced working for Cory Publishing in Bay City. His snobbish older sister Donna interfered in his love life. Marley arrived from boarding school in Switzerland to finish her education at Bay City High School. Marley got the shock of her life when a girl named Vicky Carson, who looked exactly like her, blew into town. The truth then came out that Donna was their mother and had no idea that she had given birth to twins. It turned out Reginald placed Vicky for adoption without Donna's knowledge. Vicky had come to town with her lover, Jake McKinnon, and foster mother Bridget Connell, to take her half of Marley's trust fund. Jake got close to his cousin Ben's girlfriend Marley in order to film her so Vicky could study the videos and impersonate her twin. Marley innocently fell in love with Jake and he with her, despite Vicky's jealousy.

Marley was diagnosed with haemosynthosis and needed a bone marrow transplant, so Vicky revealed herself in order to donate to her ailing sister. After Marley’s recovery, the twins developed a strong bond, though there was always some tension beneath the surface. Marley and Vicky met their biological father Michael and they became very close, with both Marley and Vicky taking his name. Marley and Jake married and left town.

Marley returned to town after she found out Jake was cheating on her. Jake had been hoping to reconcile, but he and Marley could not work things out. Vicky became pregnant and claimed the baby belonged to Jamie Frame (Laurence Lau). Jamie and Vicky married, while Marley and Jake managed to reunite. Marley was thrilled to become an aunt when Vicky's son Steven was born. Everybody's happiness was short-lived when Jake realized that he could actually be Steven's father due to a one-night stand with Vicky. Jake and Marley formed a united front and decided to fight for full custody of Steven. When a DNA test proved Jamie was in fact Steven's father, Marley and Jake were devastated. The damage done to their marriage was irreparable and Jake and Marley divorced. Afterwards, Marley left town to travel around Europe.

Marley returned to town and grew close with Jake again. While on vacation in Nice, France, she ran into Jamie, who was now divorced from Vicky. They ended up falling in love, but Marley still felt she should be with Jake. When Jake proposed to her, Marley accepted. Unbeknownst to Marley, Jake had slept with Donna months earlier and was cheating on her with Paulina Cantrell.

Marley discovered Jake's affair with Paulina and broke off their engagement. Jake became enraged and raped her. After the rape, Marley returned home where Vicky questioned why she was so distraught. Marley lied and told Vicky that Jake had only tried to rape her. When Vicky went to confront Jake at his TV studio, she found him shot. Jake survived and Marley became one of the prime suspects in his shooting. A witness came forward and claimed he had seen Marley leave Jake's studio around the time he was shot and Marley was arrested and charged with attempted murder. Cass Winthrop became her attorney and she confided in him about the rape. Marley panicked before the start of the trial and left town. To keep her sister out of trouble, Vicky took her place in court. Marley eventually returned to face the music. Though he promised he wouldn't, Cass made Marley confess on the stand that Jake had raped her. The whole courtroom was stunned and it caused Donna to confess to the murder, though she too was innocent (Paulina was the real perpetrator). In her fake confession, Donna admitted she had slept with Jake, and Marley turned her back on her mother.

Marley's whole life had fallen apart, but Jamie helped her through it. They became engaged and began planning a family. Jake still wanted Marley, but Marley made it clear she wanted nothing to do with him. Jake continued to interfere in her relationship with Jamie, but they managed to survive his sabotage. Marley had discovered it would be difficult for her to become pregnant and she sought out treatment. She was determined to give Jamie another child, but her treatments were not working. Dennis Wheeler, Jamie's best friend and step-nephew, returned to town and an attraction grew between him and Marley. The strain of her infertility issues, not to mention her closeness with Dennis, ended her relationship with Jamie.

Marley was reluctant to jump into another relationship and held off on dating Dennis. Olivia Matthews came to Marley with an offer to adopt the baby she was carrying. Marley was thrilled to finally get the chance be a mother. Then she found out Dennis was the father. This complicated matters between them, but they both tried to be there for Olivia. Olivia changed her mind about the adoption and left town to give birth. Marley and Dennis had now both lost a baby.

Marley briefly dated Byron Pierce, who pushed her and Dennis together when he saw they had feelings for each other. Dennis and Marley realized they should be together and began officially dating. They were happy for a time, but it became clear neither of them wanted anything too serious. Marley realized she and Dennis were not meant to be and broke up with him. Dennis subsequently left town.

Marley continued to be the shoulder to cry on for her friends and family, particularly her sister. Marley eventually moved to San Francisco for a new life. She appeared for Vicky's wedding to Jake, where she gave them her blessing. She also came back for Michael's funeral.

A few years later, Marley returned to live in Bay City full-time. She had a terrible accident and was badly burned. Vicky and Jake helped her through it and Jake and Marley were finally able to put the past behind them. Marley believed her and Jake were meant to be together and decided to get her sister out of the way. She kidnapped Vicky and made everyone believe she had died. Jake felt something was not right about Vicky's "death" and decided to find out what Marley was up to. He discovered Vicky was alive and Marley was sent to a mental institution. When Marley was released, Vicky forgave her and asked her to move in. Jake was furious and moved out. He later reconciled with Vicky, and came around to forgiving Marley. Marley met lawyer Tyrone Montgomery and they began dating.

== Reception ==
For her portrayal of Marley and Vicky, Wheeler won the 1986 Outstanding Ingenue in a Drama Series at the 1986 13th Daytime Emmy Awards.
