= Anne Rose Brooks =

American actress

Anne Rose Brooks (born July 15, 1963, in Plainview, New York) is an American soap opera actress.

== Career ==
Brooks most predominant roles were on soaps in the early 1980s, specifically Diana Frame on Another World (1981 to 1982) and Stephanie Aldrich on The Doctors (1982). Her first job, a print ad, was for a never released cereal product, Morning Power.

On Another World, Brooks was required to play the role of Diana Frame with an Australian accent, but in reality, Brooks was born and raised in the United States.

== Personal life ==
Brooks's parents were poet and lawyer Eugene Brooks (1921–2001; born Eugene Ginsberg), the older brother of poet Allen Ginsberg, and his wife Constance. She had four brothers.
