= Lainson =

Lainson is a surname. Notable people with the surname include:

- Harvey Lainson (c. 1935–2005), Canadian minister, politician, and businessman
- Ralph Lainson (1927–2015), British parasitologist
- Thomas Lainson (1825–1898), British architect
