= Mimi Leahey =

American screenwriter

Mimi Leahey was an actor in the 1970s who became an American television soap opera script writer.

== Biography ==
Leahey acted in community theatre at the Elmwood Playhouse in Nyack, New York, where she played Mrs. Margery Pinchwife in The Country Wife in the 1974–75 season. She went on to spend 25 years writing and editing scripts for the daytime soap operas Another World, As the World Turns and All My Children, and also worked on two original series for Sony Pictures in Moscow. Over her writing career she received nine Daytime Emmy Award nominations and three Writers Guild of America Awards. She later co-wrote the book for Surfin' Days, a musical by composer Joseph Mulroy that was staged at Irvine Valley College in April 2024. Leahey has remained active at the Elmwood Playhouse, where she has produced several productions and chairs the play selection committee.

== Positions held ==
All My Children

- Script Editor (July 1999 - May 13, 2004)

Another World

- Script Writer (1988–1998)

As the World Turns

- Script Writer (January 18, 2007 - August 10, 2007)

== Awards and nominations ==
Daytime Emmy Award

- Nomination, 2001–2004, Best Writing, All My Children
- Nomination, 1994 & 1996, Best Writing, Another World

Writers Guild of America Award

- Win, 2000, 2001 & 2003, Best Writing All My Children
- Nomination, 1999, Best Writing, All My Children
- Nomination, 1995 & 1997, Best Writing, Another World
