= Vicky Hudson =

- Another World character
- Jensen Buchanan as Vicky Hudson
- Portrayed by: Ellen Wheeler (1985–86); Rhonda Lewin (1986); Anne Heche (1987–91); Jensen Buchanan (1991–2001); Cynthia Watros (1998)
- Duration: 1985–2001
- First appearance: April 11, 1985
- Last appearance: February 20, 2001
- Created by: Gary Tomlin
- Introduced by: Stephen Schenkel (1985); Christopher Goutman (1999)
- Crossover appearances: As the World Turns
In-universe information
- Other names: Vicky Love; Vicky Carson; Vicky McKinnon
- Occupation: Senator's Aide; Employee at Cory Publishing
- Father: Michael Hudson
- Mother: Donna Hudson
- Adoptive father: Philip Carson
- Adoptive mother: Grace Carson
- Sisters: Marley Love
- Half-brothers: Nicholas Hudson
- Spouse: Jamie Frame (1989); Grant Harrison (1993–94); Jake McKinnon (1997–99)
- Sons: Steven Frame; Kirkland Harrison
- Daughters: Bridget McKinnon; Michelle McKinnon
- Grandfathers: Reginald Love
- Grandmothers: Elizabeth Love; Clara Hudson
- Uncles: John Hudson; Peter Love; Scott LaSalle (adoptive)
- Aunts: Nicole Love
- First cousins: Gregory Hudson

Vicky Hudson is a fictional character that appeared on the NBC daytime soap opera Another World and the CBS daytime soap opera As the World Turns. The character was introduced in 1985 as the secret twin sister of Marley Love, and the twins were played by Ellen Wheeler, who left the following year due to exhaustion. Rhonda Lewin then portrayed Vicky from September to December 1986, before the role of both twins were then played by Anne Heche from 1987 to 1991. Vicky was last played by Jensen Buchanan, who debuted on July 25, 1991. The character was killed in a plane crash in November 1999, but remained as a ghost through 2001. Cynthia Watros also portrayed the role temporarily in 1998.

== Storylines ==
Victoria "Vicky" Carson and her twin sister, Marley, are born to teenagers Michael Hudson (Kale Browne) and Donna Love (Anna Stuart). Michael never knew Donna was pregnant and Donna was unaware that she had given birth to twins. Marley was raised as Donna's sister and enjoyed all the privileges of coming from a wealthy family. Vicky was stolen by her grandfather, Reginald Love (John Considine), and given up for adoption. Vicky was adopted by Phillip and Grace Carson and grew up poor in Lassiter, Pennsylvania. She was raised by Bridget Connell (Barbara Berjer) after her parents' death.

Teenage Vicky discovered that there was an heiress named Marley Love that looked exactly like her living in Bay City. Her boyfriend Jake McKinnon (Tom Eplin) came to Bay City before Vicky. The plan was for Jake to film Marley so that Vicky could study videos and impersonate her for long enough to access her trust fund and take the half to which she was entitled. With Vicky's arrival, the truth about what Reginald did all those years ago came out and Vicky was welcomed into the Love family. Jake ended up falling in love with Marley, leaving Vicky heartbroken since she and Jake had been lovers. Despite the wedge between them, Vicky saved leukemia-stricken Marley's life when she donated her bone marrow to her. Vicky came around eventually and formed close bonds with Marley, Donna, Michael, and the rest of her family. She reluctantly gave her blessing to Jake and Marley's marriage.

Vicky got into a car accident and was in a coma for a few months. Jamie Frame (Laurence Lau) was Vicky's doctor during her coma and helped to bring Vicky back to life. Vicky started to fall for Jamie but he didn't return her feelings because he was in love with Lisa Grady (Joanna Going), niece of Felicia Gallant (Linda Dano). Both Lisa and Jamie regarded Vicky as a friend, but that did not matter to Vicky who was determined to have Jamie for herself. After trying for months to put a wedge between them, Vicky finally got her way when she and Jamie had sex. She also slept with Jake, who was separated from Marley, around that time. Vicky found out she was pregnant and was unsure of who the father was. Vicky told Jamie the baby was his, causing his and Lisa's relationship to deteriorate. Jamie and Vicky married and welcomed a son, Steven Michael Frame. After Jamie grew suspicious, Vicky confessed that Jake might be Steven's father, but then lied that he had raped her. Jamie attacked Jake who revealed that the sex was consensual. A DNA test was done to determine Steven's paternity. Jake and Marley had reconciled and decided they would sue for full custody of Steven if Jake turned out to be his father. Vicky was infuriated by this and made it clear that her sister and best friend were now dead to her. The DNA test proved Jamie was Steven's father, but the damage was done and both Hudson sisters saw their marriages end.

Jamie sued for and won full custody of Steven. Vicky was devastated and vowed to get her son back. She had been left stock in Cory Publishing by Reginald and decided to use it as leverage when the position of CEO at Cory Publishing was up for vote and it was between Jamie's mother, Rachel Cory (Victoria Wyndham), and his stepsister Iris Wheeler (Carmen Duncan). Vicky offered to vote for Rachel in exchange for Steven, but Rachel refused. The vote came down to a tie with Vicky having the deciding vote. Vicky walked into the Cory Publishing boardroom and announced her vote for Iris, getting her revenge on Jamie and Rachel.

One day, while riding her horse at the country club, Vicky met the love of her life, Ryan Harrison (Paul Michael Valley). Ryan was instantly smitten with brazen, feisty Vicky, while Vicky was unimpressed with him. They began dating, but Vicky was only using Ryan to make Jamie, who was now dating Marley, jealous. Eventually, Vicky realized she cared deeply for Ryan and they began seriously dating. Vicky fell head over heels in love with Ryan. Vicky's relationship with Ryan also helped her give up her devious ways, although she was often jealous of Ryan's close friendship with his private eye partner Frankie Frame (Alice Barrett).

Meanwhile, Jake had gone into a downward spiral of depravity since his split with Marley. One of his most heinous acts was sleeping with Donna, who was now married to Michael. Vicky was disgusted when she found out about their one-night-stand, but agreed not to tell anyone to keep her family together. One night, Marley came home distraught and claimed that Jake had tried to rape her (Marley was lying since Jake actually did rape her). Vicky was furious and decided to take care of Jake herself, but someone beat her to it, because she found Jake shot. Jake survived and Marley, who was innocent, was charged with his attempted murder. When Marley panicked and fled the country, Vicky took her place at trial so she would not get into trouble. When Vicky found out from Marley's lawyer, Cass Winthrop (Stephen Schnetzer), that Jake had actually raped Marley, she was devastated.

Marley eventually returned to face the music. When it appeared Marley was going to go down for the crime, Donna confessed to shooting Jake, even though she was also innocent. In her "confession," Donna had to admit she slept with Jake. Luckily, Donna was cleared, but her marriage to Michael was over and Marley wanted nothing to do with her. The Hudson family was in tatters, but Ryan was there for Vicky every step of the way. Ryan proposed and Vicky happily accepted.

As much as Vicky loved Ryan, she also felt suffocated by him. She wanted excitement, and Ryan's older brother, Grant (Mark Pinter), offered that. She began to work for him and an mutual attraction grew. One night, they had sex. Vicky immediately regretted it, but Grant did not. She hoped Ryan would never find out, but he managed to piece things together. Vicky begged Ryan to forgive her, but he could not and broke up with her.

To get over Ryan, Vicky became involved with Grant and eventually married him. Vicky was still in love with Ryan, something Grant knew, but hoped would go away. While they were honeymooning in Canada, Vicky was kidnapped by Carl Hutchins. Ryan rescued her and while trapped in a cave, they had sex. Vicky confessed this to Grant and he forgave her. Vicky was kidnapped again, this time by Ian Rain. While trying to rescue her, Grant accidentally shot Vicky. However, Grant made Vicky believe Ian had shot her. Grant was desperate to get Vicky away from Ryan and whisked her off to Switzerland under the pretense of getting her treatment for her injury. Vicky began to suspect that Grant was up to something. She found out that the drugs she was taking were not for her health, but were just meant to keep her in a drugged state so she would not leave. She also discovered it was Grant who had shot her. Vicky escaped with Steven in tow and ran into Ryan, who had come to rescue her. They declared their love for each other and decided to be together again. Vicky told Grant she did not love him and their marriage was over. Surprisingly, Grant backed off and let Ryan and Vicky reunite. The future seemed bright for the pair- until Vicky found out she was having Grant's baby. Vicky lied to Grant that Ryan was the father and decided to have an abortion. Ryan confessed to Grant he was the baby's father and Grant begged Vicky not to go through with the abortion. Vicky agreed to have the baby and Ryan promised he would stand by her.

Vicky gave birth to a son named Kirkland Grant Harrison. Grant immediately became possessive of the child and Vicky decided to flee with him. Months later, Vicky returned to town and passed off another baby as Kirkland so she could hide the real Kirkland from Grant. Grant discovered this and decided to get revenge on Vicky by shooting himself and framing her for it. Vicky was charged with Grant's attempted murder, but his scheme was uncovered and Vicky was cleared.

Vicky and Ryan remained strong throughout Grant's schemes against them, but then tragedy struck. Grant and Ryan's presumed-dead mother, Justine Duvalier, came to town and immediately began terrorizing everybody she could. Justine kidnapped Kirkland; Grant and Ryan tracked her down and things came to a head on a train track. When it appeared Ryan was going to shoot Justine, Grant panicked, since only Justine knew where Kirkland was, and shot Ryan. Ryan was critically injured, but there was still hope he could pull through. Sadly, it was not meant to be and Ryan died with Vicky by his side.

Vicky tearfully buried her soulmate and tried to find a way to get on with her life. Grant had made everybody believe that it was Justine who had shot Ryan. Vicky grew close with Grant again and it soon became apparent Grant was hoping for a second chance. However, Vicky found out the truth about Grant shooting Ryan and decided to manipulate a confession out of him. She even went so far as to pretend to marry him by hiring an actor to officiate their ceremony. Grant found out what Vicky was plotting and attempted to kidnap her, Kirkland, and Steven. He was caught before they could leave and charged with Ryan's murder. Months later, Grant saved the life of the governor's daughter and was pardoned. Vicky's loved ones rallied around her to protect her from Grant, who was determined more than ever to have Kirkland to himself. Vicky and Jake also became closer than they had ever been. Jake wanted more, but Vicky just wanted friendship.

Vicky met a man named Bobby Reno (Robert Kelker-Kelly) when he came to do work on her home. She immediately felt an inexplicable attraction to him. She and Bobby developed a friendship, but he was reluctant to open up to her. Eventually, Vicky discovered that Bobby had received Ryan's corneas in a transplant, which explained their connection. Vicky and Bobby began falling for each other. Bobby had a mysterious past which he promised to tell Vicky about if she ran away with him. Vicky agreed, but before they could leave, Grant rigged a bomb to Bobby's truck and it exploded on a snowy mountain road with Bobby and Vicky inside. While Vicky was unconscious after the explosion, Ryan's ghost came to visit her. Ryan and Vicky shared a brief, sweet reunion where they finally married. Ryan told Vicky her family needed her and she needed to live. Vicky walked out of the light and back into the real world, finally letting Ryan go.

Grant was charged with the attempted murder of Vicky and Bobby, but there was not enough evidence and the charges were dropped. Bobby revealed his real name was Shane Roberts and he was on the run for murder he did not commit. He was eventually caught and sent back to prison. With Jake's help, Vicky found the real murderer and Shane was released. It seemed like Shane and Vicky were finally going to be happy together, but then his estranged wife, Lila Roberts (Lisa Peluso), came to Bay City and was determined to win him back. Lila coming between them put a huge strain on their relationship and Vicky grew even closer to Jake. Jake wanted a future with Vicky, which left her with a tough choice to make. Eventually, Vicky decided Jake was the one for her and accepted his marriage proposal. Shane begged Vicky not to marry Jake. Vicky felt conflicted, but stuck by Jake. After many delays, their wedding day finally arrived. It was cancelled when Kirkland was struck by a car. Vicky and Jake later married in the hospital at Kirkland's bedside.

Shane refused to believe he and Vicky were over and continued to pursue her. Vicky agreed to meet Shane at the Love family cabin. While there, she and Shane kissed. There was nothing stopping Vicky and Shane from having sex, but then Vicky realized that Jake was all she wanted. Jake had suspected something was going on and also went to the cabin. When they realized Jake was there, Vicky hid while Shane got Jake to leave. Tragically, Shane and Michael were killed in a head-on collision that same night. Vicky was devastated at losing her father and the man she had once loved. She blamed herself since Shane was on his way home from their meet-up. Vicky decided not to tell Jake about her meeting with Shane, fearing he would leave her. Jake was later arrested for causing Shane's death. Vicky admitted on the witness stand that she was at the cabin with Shane. Jake was cleared for Shane's death, but he wanted nothing to do with Vicky. He eventually forgave her and they reconciled. Unfortunately, they still had to deal with the meddling of Grant and Lila.

Marley moved back to Bay City full-time. She had an accident and her face was badly burned. Vicky was there for her sister, as was Jake, who managed to finally repair his relationship with Marley. Marley became convinced her and Jake were meant to be and decided to get Vicky out the picture by kidnapping her. Marley took Vicky's place while everyone believed Vicky had died. Jake found out what Marley was up to and rescued his wife. Marley was sent to institution while Jake and Vicky tried once again to put their lives back together. When Marley was released from the institution, Vicky decided to forgive her and even asked her to move in with her and Jake. Jake vehemently opposed any association with Marley and moved out. Jake came to his senses and reconciled once again with Vicky.

After years of putting up with Grant, Vicky decided to get him out of her life once and for all. She began collecting evidence to use against him, but he caught on to her plan. He told her was going to take Kirkland out of the country and attempted to tie her up, but Vicky hit him over the head with a marble statue. She thought she had killed him, but it was actually Tito Banacek who had supposedly finished him off (Grant was later revealed to be alive, having faked his death and fled to the island of Tanquir).

Vicky and Jake decided to start a family of their own. Vicky became pregnant and they were thrilled to find out they were expecting twin girls.

== Reception ==
For her portrayal of Marley and Vicky, Wheeler won the 1986 Outstanding Ingenue in a Drama Series at the 1986 13th Daytime Emmy Awards. Charlie Mason from Soaps She Knows called Watros' temporary portrayal of Vicky as one of the best soap opera temporary recasts in American soap operas due to Watros' talent.
