= Michael Eilbaum =

American television soap opera director

Michael Eilbaum is an American television soap opera director.

== Directing Credits ==
Another World

- Director (1980-1999)

As the World Turns

- Director (1999-2010)

One Life to Live

- Director (September 2010-January 2012)

Hollywood Heights

- Director (June 27-October 3, 2012)

The Young and the Restless

- Director (October 17, 2012 – present)

== Awards and nominations ==
Daytime Emmy Award

- Win, 2000, 2001, 2007 Directing Team, As the World Turns
- Nomination, 2002, 2003, Directing Team, As the World Turns
- Nomination, 1992, 1993, 1995, Directing Team, Another World
- Win, 1992, Directing Team, Another World
