= Judith Pinsker =

American screenwriter (1940–2014)

Judith Ann Pinsker (January 17, 1940, Kenmore, New York - April 26, 2014, Englewood, New Jersey) was an American television writer.

Pinsker co-wrote (with Claire Labine) the 1995 New York Times bestseller General Hospital tie-in novel Robin's Diary, based on the AIDS storyline between characters Stone Cates and Robin Scorpio.

== Writing credits ==
- Ryan's Hope (Hired by Claire Labine; 1976-1984)
- Another World (1984-1994)
- General Hospital (Hired by Claire Labine; 1995-1998)

== Awards and nominations ==
Daytime Emmy Awards

WINS

- (1978, 1979, 1980, 1983 & 1984; Best Writing; Ryan's Hope)
- (1995; Best Writing; General Hospital)

NOMINATIONS

- (1985 & 1994; Best Writing; Another World)

Writers Guild of America Award

WINS

- (1979 season; Ryan's Hope)
- (1996 & 1998 seasons; General Hospital)

NOMINATIONS

- (1980 season; Ryan's Hope)
- (1994 & 1995 seasons; Another World)
- (1997 season; General Hospital)
