= Mary Madeiras =

American television soap opera director

- Occupation: television director
- Known for: Another World
- Awards: Daytime Emmy Award, Directors Guild of America Award

Mary Madeiras is an American television soap opera director.

== Directing credits ==
All My Children

- Occasional Director (2003)

Another World

- Associate Director (1991–1999)

Days of Our Lives

- Occasional Director (2001–2003)

General Hospital

- Director (2003)
- Occasional Director (2002)

Passions

- Occasional Director (1999)

== Awards and nominations ==
Daytime Emmy Award

- Win, 2004, Directing, General Hospital
- Nomination, 1993, Directing, Another World
- Win, 1992, Directing, Another World

Directors Guild of America Award

- Win, 1993, Directing, Another World
