= Jensen Buchanan =

American soap opera actress

- Born: July 18, 1962 (age 63); Montgomery, Alabama, U.S.
- Occupation: Actress
- Years active: 1987–2002; 2015–present
- Spouses: Gray O'Brien (m. 1991; div. 1999) Sam Gores (m. 2003; div. 2013)
- Children: 2

Jensen Buchanan (born July 18, 1962, in Montgomery, Alabama) is an American soap opera actress, known for portraying Sarah Gordon on One Life to Live (1987–90) and twins Vicky Hudson and Marley Love on Another World.

== Early life ==
Buchanan was born in Montgomery, Alabama, on July 18, 1962. She was the only child of William and Mary Buchanan, who divorced when she was a toddler. She was raised in Neenah, Wisconsin. She attended Boston University on scholarship from 1980 to 1984, eventually earning a degree in music theory.

== Career ==
Buchanan originated the role of Sarah Gordon on the ABC soap opera One Life to Live, playing the character from 1987 to 1990. In 1991, she moved to the NBC soap opera Another World. She played Vicky Hudson from 1991 to 1999. She also played Vicky's twin, Marley Love, from 1991 to 1994, with reappearances in 1997 and 1998. Buchanan was nominated for two Lead Actress Daytime Emmy Awards in 1996 and 1997. She moved to As the World Turns in a short term capacity to play the role of Vicky, who was killed in a plane crash in November 1999, but she continued to make appearances until 2001. In 2001, she started playing the role of Melissa Bedford, R. N. on General Hospital. She exited the role in 2002.

From 2015 to 2016, Buchanan appeared on the soap opera The Young and the Restless, playing Elise Moxley, a member of the Genoa City social set.

== Personal life ==
On December 28, 1991, Buchanan married Gray O'Brien. They had two sons, John Conor O'Brien (born April 22, 1994) and Angus O'Hagan O'Brien (born February 26, 1996). They divorced in the late 1990s.

In 2003, she married Sam Gores, Paradigm Talent & Literary Agency, President and CEO. The couple separated in October 2013 and are now divorced .

In 2016, Buchanan was arrested for driving under the influence and colliding head on with another driver on California State Route 154. In October 2017, she was sentenced to one year in jail at Santa Barbara County Jail and five years' probation. In January 2018, Buchanan was once again arrested, this time for allegedly drinking while under felony probation. Following a court appearance, she was ordered to remain in jail pending another hearing. On April 6, 2018, Buchanan was acquitted of probation violation and released from jail.
