= Stephen Schenkel =

Stephen Schenkel (September 25, 1934 - December 14, 2009) was an American TV producer and network executive. Schenkel produced a number of soap opera programs; in particular he is known for being executive producer of All My Children, Another World, and The Edge of Night.

== Early life and education ==
Schenkel was a graduate of Columbia University, class of 1956.

== Career ==
Schenkel served as an executive at NBC, CBS, ABC and Benton & Bowles. He developed and produced variety, mini-series, and game shows programs as well as Discovery Channel documentaries. He was also co-creator and creative consultant on Ryan's Hope and ABC After School Specials.

Schenkel was hired as a producer on the daytime serial Another World in 1985; he then became executive producer of All My Children in 1987, but resigned in 1989, citing ill health.

== Personal ==
Schenkel married Penny Bergman in 1990 after meeting her on the set of All My Children. He died on December 14, 2009, aged 75.
