= Michael Laibson =

American television producer

Michael D. Laibson is an American television producer and theatre director who is notable for producing soap operas such as As the World Turns (1986–1988), Another World (AW) (1988–1993), All My Children (Senior Producer) and Guiding Light (1995–1996).

He earned a B.A. from UCLA, and taught for the Saratoga Arts Festival.

== Writing career ==
He was a writer on AW during the 1988 Writers Guild of America strike. The stories were written by Donna Swajeski (then head writer) and Harding Lemay.

== Awards/Nominations ==
He's garnered 4 Daytime Emmy Awards nominations and 1 win.
