= Samuel D. Ratcliffe =

American screenwriter

Samuel D. Ratcliffe (1945–December 14, 1995) was an American screenwriter for daytime television. He won an Emmy for his work on Santa Barbara in 1991.

== Early life and education ==
Born in Winter Haven, Florida, Ratcliffe grew up in Birmingham, Alabama and graduated from Birmingham–Southern College, where he was a member of Omicron Delta Kappa and Alpha Psi Omega.

== Acting career ==
He moved to New York City in 1968 to pursue a career as an actor. From 1968 until the mid-seventies, he appeared in commercials, films and theatre. He performed in the chorus of Fiddler on the Roof on Broadway, was Matt in the long-running off-Broadway play, The Fantasticks and starred in the Broadway musical Hurry Harry.

He also performed at in the Olney Theater in a 1971 production of Whispers on the Wind, and at the Washington Theater Club in a 1972 production of The Comedy of Errors.

== Writing career ==
In 1976, Ratcliffe began to write for daytime television dramas. He worked as an associate writer on Guiding Light.

He won a Daytime Emmy in 1991 for his work as Head Writer for NBC Daytime's Santa Barbara. He also served as head writer for NBC's Texas and Another World.

== Death ==
He died in his home in New York City on December 14, 1995 due to complications from AIDS.

== Accolades ==
Daytime Emmy Awards

WINS

- (1991; Best Writing; Santa Barbara)

NOMINATIONS

- (1985; Best Writing; Guiding Light)
- (1985, 1994 & 1996; Best Writing; Another World)

Writers Guild of America Award

WINS

- (1991 & 1992 seasons; Santa Barbara)

NOMINATIONS

- (1985 season; Guiding Light)
- (1993 season; Santa Barbara)
- (1994, 1995 & 1996 seasons; Another World)
