= Harding Lemay =

American screenwriter (1922–2018)

Harding Lemay (March 16, 1922 – May 26, 2018), also known as Pete Lemay, was an American screenwriter and playwright who was the head writer for the soap opera Another World.

== Career ==
Lemay was head writer of the soap opera Another World, from 1971 to 1979. The series earned a Daytime Emmy Award for Outstanding Drama Series in 1976. By 1979, Lemay decided not to continue writing the series for a ninth straight calendar year, and first handed over to a new writer before leaving for good later that year. He also wrote out three of the show's most popular actors: George Reinholt (Steve Frame), Jacqueline Courtney (Alice Matthews Frame), and Virginia Dwyer (Mary Matthews), in 1975.

Lemay co-created Lovers and Friends with Paul Rauch, later retooled and referred to as For Richer, For Poorer. Lemay was also a playwright, whose works have been produced both off-Broadway and on Broadway. He was also a friend and mentor to Douglas Marland, who was his subwriter on Another World and later became one of daytime TV's most prolific writers as head writer for Guiding Light, General Hospital and As the World Turns.

== Personal life ==
Lemay was born on March 16, 1922, near the Mohawk Indian reservation in North Bangor, New York, where his mother grew up. He ran away to New York City at age 17 where he attended the Neighborhood Playhouse School of the Theatre.

From September 1947 to 1953, he was married to Priscilla Amidon. He married his second wife, Dorothy Shaw on September 19, 1953; she died in 1994. His third wife was Gloria Gardner. Lemay died on May 26, 2018, at the age of 96.

== Positions held ==
Another World

- Story consultant (1995–1997)
- Head writer (1971–1979; 1988)

As the World Turns

- Story consultant (1985–1987)

The Doctors

- Head writer (1981–1982)

Guiding Light

- Consultant (1995)
- Writer (1980-1981)

Lovers and Friends/For Richer, For Poorer

- Co-creator
- Head writer (1977)

One Life to Live

- Story consultant (1998–1999)

== Awards and nominations ==
Daytime Emmy Awards

Wins

- (1975; Best Writing; Another World)
- (1981; Best Writing; Guiding Light)

Nominations

- (1977 & 1996; Best Writing; Another World)

== Head write tenure ==
Preceded by Robert Cenedella	Head writer of Another World; August 31, 1971 – May 11, 1979	Succeeded by Tom King
Preceded by Aaron Scott & Anne Marie Barlow	Head writer of The Doctors (with Stephen Lemay); December 21, 1981 – June 4, 1982	Succeeded by Elizabeth Levin
Preceded by Donna Swajeski (de facto)	Head writer of Another World; September 12, 1988 – November 10, 1988	Succeeded by Donna Swajeski

== Works ==
- Inside, Looking Out: A Personal Memoir. New York: Harper's Magazine Press. 1971. ISBN 0061263001.
- Eight years in Another World. Atheneum. 1981. ISBN 9780689111495.
