= Donna Swajeski =

American writer

Donna Swajeski is an American writer known for her work on television soap operas. She has been a head writer, a co-head writer and a breakdown writer on award-winning daytime dramas for NBC Daytime, ABC Daytime and CBS Daytime. Before beginning her writing career on daytime dramas, she was Director of the East Coast Daytime Programs for NBC.

== Awards and nominations ==
As co-head writer for Guiding Light, Swajeski and her team won the 2007 Daytime Emmy Award for Outstanding Writing. The show was also recognized as the 2007 Daytime Emmy winner for Outstanding Drama Series. She is also a winner of a Writers Guild of America Award for best Daytime writing, also for Guiding Light. She is currently working with children at the Delaware Children's Theater. She is a director, producer and actress.

Daytime Emmy Awards

WINS

- (2007; Best Writing; Guiding Light)

NOMINATIONS

- (1989; Best Writing; Another World)
- (1999, 2005 & 2008; Best Writing; Guiding Light)
- (2012; Best Writing; All My Children)

Writers Guild of America Award

WINS

- (2005 season; Guiding Light)

NOMINATIONS

- (1999 & 2007 seasons; Guiding Light)
- (2012 season; All My Children)

== Positions held ==
All My Children

- Program Executive: 1980s
- Co-Head Writer (with David Kreizman): March 15, 2010 – April 1, 2011

Another World

- Head writer: November 1988 - November 1992

The Bold and the Beautiful (hired by Bradley Bell)

- Script writer: September 24, 2009 - March 23, 2010

Guiding Light

- Associate head writer: 1999 - 2001, March 2004 - 2009
- Co-head writer: September 2003 - March 2004, 2005 - February 29, 2008, April 14, 2008 - August 21, 2008

Port Charles

- Screenwriter: 2001 - 2003

== HW History ==
Preceded by Sheri Anderson	De facto head writer of Another World during Writers Guild of America strike April 18 – September 9, 1988	Succeeded by Harding Lemay
Preceded by Harding Lemay	Head writer of Another World; November 11, 1988 – November 27, 1992	Succeeded by Peggy Sloane
Preceded by Ellen Weston; Carolyn Culliton	Co-Head writer of Guiding Light (with Ellen Weston: September 15, 2003–July 5, 2004) (with David Kreizman: July 6, 2004–February 29, 2008); September 15, 2003 - February 29, 2008	Succeeded by WGA Strike)
Preceded by WGA Strike	Co-Head writer of Guiding Light (with David Kreizman); April 14, 2008 - August 21, 2008	Succeeded by David Kreizman; Christopher Dunn; Lloyd Gold; Jill Lorie Hurst
Preceded by Lorraine Broderick (interim)	Co-Head writer of All My Children; May 12, 2010 – June 24, 2011; With: David Kreizman	Succeeded by Lorraine Broderick

== Personal life ==
Swajeski lives in Arden, Delaware with her husband, radio talk show host Mike Opelka.
