= Opelka =

Opelka is a Czech surname. Notable people with the surname include:

- Mike Opelka (born 1957), American radio broadcaster and television producer
- Reilly Opelka (born 1997), American tennis player
