= Kimberley Simms =

American actress

- Born: Toledo, Ohio, U.S.
- Education: UCLA
- Occupation: Actress
- Years active: 1983-1997
- Spouse: Christopher Blobaum (m. 2001)
- Children: 1

Kimberley Simms (born July 27) is an American actress. She is best known for playing the role of Mindy Lewis on the CBS soap opera Guiding Light from 1989 to 1992.

== Early life ==
Simms was born in Toledo, Ohio. Her father was a real estate developer. She is the second of five children. Her family moved to Melbourne, Florida when she was 15. Simms worked as a model and performed in community theater during her school years. She graduated from Eau Gallie High School.

She was badly injured in a car accident at age eighteen and had to have her face reconstructed with plastic surgery. She attended the University of California, Irvine and also UCLA, where she earned a degree in theater.

== Career ==
Simms appeared on stage in numerous school and regional productions, including Loose Ends, Crimes of the Heart, Spoon River Anthology, Misalliance, Grease, and Bus Stop. Her other early roles include appearances on Kids Are People Too and the CBS soap opera Capitol. She appeared in the films Caught, Buster's First Date, and Fury to Freedom.

Simms was cast as Mindy Lewis on Guiding Light, first airing in July 1989. The role had previously been played by Krista Tesreau. Simms won a Soap Opera Digest Award in 1991 for Outstanding Female Newcomer for her role on Guiding Light. Simms was dismissed from the role when she couldn't come to an agreement with the executive producer, Jill Farren Phelps, about the length of her new contract. Simms told Soap Opera Digest that she wanted to stay on the series for another year, but the show would only agree to a two-year deal. Her final airdate was June 26, 1992. The role was recast with Ann Hamilton. Simms returned to Guiding Light for two episodes in September 1997.

After leaving Guiding Light, Simms appeared in films and an episode of Burke's Law, titled "Who Killed the Soap Star?"

== Personal life ==
She has been married to chef Christopher Blobaum since 2001. The couple have a daughter, whom they adopted from China.
