= Jill Lorie Hurst =

American writer (born 1901)

Jill Lorie Hurst is an American television soap opera writer and producer.

Hurst is a native of Detroit. She studied theater at Wayne State University, then moved to New York City. For several years, she was a waitress during the day and would see Broadway shows in the evening.

She was initially hired at Guiding Light as a receptionist, and was then promoted to writer's assistant, eventually becoming part of the writing team and, in the last several years of the show, head writer.

== Positions held ==
Guiding Light

- Head writer (with David Kreizman, Lloyd Gold, Christopher Dunn): August 22, 2008 – 2009
- Story Producer: June 11, 2007 – August 21, 2008
- Associate head writer: 2001, August 15, 2006 – June 7, 2007
- Script writer: 1999 - 2001, 2002 – August 14, 2006
- Assistant to the writers: 1994–1999

== Awards and nominations ==
Daytime Emmy Award

- Win, 2007, Best Writing, Guiding Light
- Nomination, 2005, Best Writing, Guiding Light
- Nomination, 2003, Best Writing, Guiding Light
- Nomination, 1999, Best Writing, Guiding Light

Writers Guild of America Award

- Nomination, 2006, Best Writing, Guiding Light
- Win, 2004, Best Writing, Guiding Light
- Nomination, 2002, Best Writing, Guiding Light
- Nomination, 2001, Best Writing, Guiding Light
- Nomination, 1998, Best Writing, Guiding Light
