= Beth Chamberlin =

American actress

- Born: October 1, 1963 (age 62); Danville, Vermont
- Years active: 1989–present
- Spouse: Peter Roy (m. 1994)
- Children: 1

Beth Chamberlin (born October 1, 1963) is an American actress, known for her role as Beth Raines on the CBS soap opera, Guiding Light.

== Early life ==
Chamberlin was born in Danville, Vermont. She studied ballet with the American Ballet Theatre before enrolling at New York University as a dance/theater major. Chamberlin has a number of regional theater credits, include The Taming of the Shrew, Godspell, Flowers for Algernon and You Can't Take It with You.

== Career ==
Chamberlin is best known for her portrayal of Beth Raines Spaulding LeMay Winslow Spaulding Bauer Spaulding on the CBS daytime soap opera Guiding Light. She was the second actress to portray the role and initially portrayed Beth for a two-year stint from 1989 to 1991. She returned to the role in November 1997 full-time and remained with the show until its cancellation in 2009. She also played the role of Lorelei Hills, Beth's dissociative identity disorder personality, from 2001 to 2002. She was nominated for the 2010 Daytime Emmy Award for Outstanding Supporting Actress in a Drama Series for her portrayal as Beth Raines on the final season of Guiding Light. Additionally, Chamberlin was nominated two other times for Soap Opera Digest Awards, once in 1991 for Outstanding Super Couple and again in 1998 for Outstanding Villainess.

On primetime television, Chamberlin guest starred on Columbo, Silk Stalkings, Cashmere Mafia, Law & Order: Special Victims Unit, Blue Bloods, and Chicago Med. She co-starred in two television pilots; Murder in Manhattan for ABC in 2013, and Untitled Wall Street Project for CBS in 2014. In 2022, she was cast as a series regular in the third season of the crime drama series La Reina del Sur playing Jane Kosar.

== Personal life ==
Chamberlin has been married to Dr. Peter Roy since 1994.

In March 2008, Chamberlin released "The Kettlebell Way To Your Perfect Body" and launched a health and fitness website. She released her second kettlebell DVD, "The Kettlebell Way, Volume 2 - Empire State" in the November, 2008. Chamberlin is a certified kettlebell trainer and a member of National Strength and Conditioning Association.

On December 4, 2025, Chamberlin revealed in a series of Instagram videos that she had been diagnosed with endometrial cancer in October of that year and had undergone a hysterectomy. She revealed that the cancer was in its early stages and had not spread to anywhere else in her body, stating that she was "lucky."

== Filmography ==
Year	Title	Role	Notes
1989	The Big Picture	Stewardess	
1989–91, 1997–2009	Guiding Light	Beth Raines Spaulding LeMay Winslow Spaulding Bauer Spaulding	Series regular Nominated — Daytime Emmy Award for Outstanding Supporting Actress in a Drama Series (2010); Nominated — Soap Opera Digest Award for Outstanding Villainess (1999); Nominated — Soap Opera Digest Award for Outstanding Super Couple: Daytime (1991)
1990	Best Shots	Blonde out of Gas	
1992	Silk Stalkings	Barbara Dunham	Episode: "Shock Jock"
1992	Columbo	Cindy	Episode: "No Time to Die"
1993	Days of Our Lives	Nancy Trent	Recurring role
1998	The Right Way		
2008	Cashmere Mafia	Cynthia Tate	Episode: "Yours, Mine and Hers"
2010	Steamboat	Tabitha	Web-series
2011	Cell	Brenda	Episode: "My Name Is Sarah"; Nominated — Indie Series Award for Outstanding Guest Appearance
2011	Law & Order: Special Victims Unit	Georgia Stanton	Episode: "Spiraling Down"
2013	Blue Bloods	Amy Seabrook	Episode: "No Regrets"
2013	Murder in Manhattan	Sheila Ramsey	TV pilot
2013	Grand Theft Auto V	Abigail Mathers	Videogame
2014	Untitled Wall Street Project	Molly Conklin	TV pilot
2015	Chicago Med	Courtney Cole	Episode: "Mistaken"
2017	Law & Order: Special Victims Unit	Gwendolyn Gates	Episode: "The Newsroom"
2018	Power	Vivian	Episode: "Second Chances"
2018	House of Cards	Tabitha Peters	Episode: "Chapter 66"
2019	FBI	Martina	Episode: "Scorched Earth"
2019	Venice: The Series	Zelda	8 episodes
2020	Billions	Lisa	Episode: "The Limitless Sh*t"
2022–2023	La Reina del Sur	Jane Kosar	Series regular, 26 episodes
