= Beth Raines =

American soap character

- Guiding Light character
- Beth Chamberlin as Beth Raines Spaulding
- Portrayed by: Judi Evans (1983–1986); Beth Chamberlin (1989–2009); Gloria Biegler (1990)
- Duration: 1983–1986; 1989–1991; 1997–2009
- First appearance: May 1983
- Last appearance: September 18, 2009
- Created by: Pam Long
- Introduced by: Gail Kobe (1983); Robert Calhoun (1989); Paul Rauch (1997)
- Judi Evans as Beth Raines
In-universe information
- Other names: Elizabeth Raines; Elizabeth Bauer; Elizabeth Spaulding; Elizabeth Lemay; Princess Elizabeth Winslow; Lorelei Hills
- Occupation: Businesswoman
- Mother: Lillian Raines
- Stepfather: Buzz Cooper
- Spouse: Rick Bauer (1989–1990, 2007–2008); Phillip Spaulding (1991–1997, 2009–present); James Lemay (2000); Edmund Winslow (2001); Bill Lewis (2001); Alan Spaulding (2005–2007)
- Sons: James Spaulding
- Daughters: Lizzie Spaulding; Peyton Spaulding
- Stepsons: Zach Spaulding
- Stepdaughters: Emma Spaulding
- Granddaughters: Sarah Randall
- Aunts: Calla Matthews
- First cousins: Jessie Matthews Hall
- Other relatives: Brandon Hall; Frank Cooper Jr.; Harley Cooper; Lucy Cooper; Cooper Bradshaw; Rocky Cooper

Beth Raines is a fictional character from the long-running American soap opera, Guiding Light. Beth is the stepdaughter of the late Bradley Raines and daughter of Lillian Raines. She is the mother of Lizzie, James, and Peyton Spaulding and is known for her tumultuous relationship with her husband Phillip Spaulding. The character was originally portrayed by actress Judi Evans from her introduction in 1983 until 1986 and then by Beth Chamberlin who portrayed the character on and off from her re-introduction in 1989 until the finale in 2009.

== Background ==
The character of Beth Raines has been half of two supercouples: Beth and Lujack Luvonaczek (Vincent Irizarry) and Beth and Philip Spaulding (Grant Aleksander). Beth has also been married to Philip's father, Alan Spaulding (Ron Raines) and Philip's best friend Rick Bauer (Michael O'Leary). Beth, Philip, Rick and Mindy Lewis (Krista Tesreau) called themselves "The Four Musketeers" in the 1980s. Together they were four best friends with an unbreakable bond.

== Storylines ==
=== 1983–86 ===
From the start, the character of Beth Raines was a recognized fan favorite. Soap Opera Digest named her 1984's Most Beleaguered Heroine, called her a part of "one of the top triangles ever to grace daytime" and compared later storylines to General Hospital's romantic/adventure couple Luke and Laura.

Beth Raines first appeared on Guiding Light in the spring of 1983. Beth was acknowledged to have been born March 16, 1966. Her biological father was killed in Vietnam. Her mother, Lillian, a nurse, had remarried Bradley Raines. In 1983, a 17-year-old Beth was admitted to Cedars Hospital as an unconscious victim of an abusive stepfather. Her roommate was Mindy Lewis. Mindy was friends with two orderlies, Phillip Spaulding and Rick Bauer. The four of them formed a fast friendship, nicknamed "The Four Musketeers" which quickly developed into a romantic quadrangle. Beth was a shy, artistic teenager. Philip and Mindy, both heirs to two of Springfield's premier families, were dating when Philip fell for Beth who was dating Rick. Fate seemed to be pushing Philip and Beth together when they were named king and queen at their high school prom. When a traumatized Beth became nearly catatonic after being raped by her stepfather, the two of them ran away to New York City. The storyline took place at Christmas time and introduced the character of Nick, a Santa-like figure who would make later appearances on the show throughout the years around the holiday season. The location shoot was plagued by bad weather and a need for many reshoots. However, the result was a charming memorable love story that Grant Aleksander (Philip) said was worth the extra effort. They returned to be married, but discovered that Mindy, Beth's maid of honor, was pregnant with Philip's child, and Philip married Mindy instead.

Beth moved on with a gangleader named Brandon Luvoneczek, who called himself Lujack . Lujack eventually learned that Alexandra Spaulding was his mother. Beth was temporarily blinded in an explosion, when a jealous Philip hired someone to blow up a bar that Lujack was building with one of his past theft victims, Floyd Parker (Tom Nielsen). Lujack was accused of the murder of Andy Ferris (whom Philip had paid to blow up Lujack's bar). Lujack was eventually cleared and pursued his music career, but was killed in an explosion on a ship, leaving a heartbroken Beth to eventually reunite with Philip briefly before being kidnapped and presumed dead in 1986.

=== 1989–1991 ===
In 1989, paintings of Beth surface and Philip becomes convinced that she is still alive. Meanwhile, Beth has returned to Springfield with Neil Everest, but with amnesia and unable to speak. A run-in with Bradley leads to her recovering her memory and eventually making amends with her stepfather. That December, Philip and Beth are reunited at the Willow Hills Sanitarium, where Philip stops Beth's marriage to Neil and Beth regains her speech. In 1990, Neil helps Beth recall what really happened when she was believed to be dead. She reveals that she killed her abductor, Professor Blackburn, when he tried to attack her. She sleeps with Philip who is at this time married to Blake, who refuses to grant him a divorce. When she finds out she's pregnant, she's unsure of the baby's paternity. She thinks it is Neil but later finds out that it's Philip. Neil is killed in an explosion that Philip is accused of causing. Philip, with the help of Rick and Beth, fakes his death to escape jail time. Beth and Rick marry to throw off suspicion related to Philip's fake death. Philip returns in October, and Beth gives birth to a daughter, Elizabeth Spualding (Lizzie), in November. In December, Beth and Rick divorce. Rick becomes Lizzie's godfather. The following year (1991) Philip and Beth marry and moved to Arizona with Lizzie.

=== 1997–2001 ===
In 1996, Philip and Beth were divorced off-screen.

In 1997, Beth returns to Springfield with Lizzie (played by Hayden Panettiere). Philip is dating Harley Cooper. Beth begins to date Ben Warren and announces to Philip that she intends to stay in town. In 1998, she teams up with Annie Dutton to try to win Philip back from Harley. She is named as a suspect in the murder of Carl Stevens. It is later revealed that young Lizzie shot and killed Carl because he had abused her mother. She protects Lizzie and unhappily allows her to be in Philip and Harley's wedding. In 1998, Beth makes a play for Matt Reardon, but later dates Jim Lemay (legally father to Harley's daughter Susan, who she gave up for adoption as a teen mom). When Beth, Philip and Jim are in a plane crash, Jim escapes to find help. Beth and Philip, thinking they are about to die make love. After being rescued, Beth accepts Jim Lemay's proposal. In 2000, Beth found out that she was pregnant with Philip's baby. She convinced Philip to allow her to pass the baby off as Jim's, to preserve both of their marriages. However, that same year, Lizzie is diagnosed with leukemia. Jim refuses to allow the doctors to induce labor to use the stem cells from the cord blood to save Lizzie's life. After breaking up and then reconciling, Jim saves Lizzie and baby James from a fire but died shortly afterward.

In 2001, Beth allows herself to be seduced by Prince Edmond Winslow of San Christobel and conspires with him to overthrow his brother, Prince Richard Winslow. She became a princess but divorced Edmond when she found out that he was holding Cassie prisoner. When she found out about it Edmund kept her in the same place he had been holding Cassie. She escaped and was saved by her ex Phillip. In 2001, Beth is presumed dead again when she is caught up in a flash flood in San Christobel.

=== 2002–2009 ===
Edmund later meets a country girl named Lorelei Hills who looks exactly like Beth. He convinces her to come to Springfield and scam the Spauldings out of Beth's fortune by convincing them that Beth wasn't really dead. The con is successful and Philip began to fall in love with "Beth." When he realizes that she is an impostor, Lorelei and Edmond are jailed. In jail, Lorelei has flashbacks of Beth's life and it is revealed that she really is Beth, only she that had amnesia all this time. Her fingerprints match and it is confirmed that she is the real Beth. Lorelei/Beth now struggles with her split personality. Lorelei dominates temporarily and runs off with Edmund. Eventually Beth's personality wins out and she is reunited with Philip and Lizzie. Just as they start to get back on track, a lover from Lorelei's past comes to Springfield in the unlikely person of Bill Lewis, the son of Billy Lewis and Vanessa Chamberlin Reardon, who was last seen as a teenager and is now a young college student.

In 2004, Philip was presumed dead, after having been shot by his father, Alan. In 2006 Beth was shocked to learn that Rick not only helped him fake his death, but had kept that information from her and everyone in Springfield. Beth married Philip's father Alan to obtain security for herself and her children. When she miscarried their baby, he became obsessed with a Lizzie's pregnancy and trying to gain custody of the child, fathered by Jonathan Randall, son of Alan's one-time wife, Reva Shayne. Beth divorced Alan Spaulding, but despite his short-lived marriage to Doris Wolfe, and his near death at the hands of her daughter Ashley, Beth and Alan continued to bounce back and forth in their relationship. At one point, during the investigation to find out who shot Alan, Beth attempted to seduce Alan's other son, Alan-Michael, but was unsuccessful.

Beth focused on protecting Lizzie and her baby from Alan and reconnected with Rick, who was at the time married to Mel Boudreaux and father to their daughter Leah. Beth, Rick and Alan formed an on-again/off-again triangle. The affair was revealed by Jonathan Randall in an angry outburst. Rick and Mel divorced and Beth became pregnant, but paternity was uncertain. A distraught Cassie tampered with the paternity test to show that Rick was the father of Beth's baby, and Beth was married to Rick on the Fourth of July by Josh Lewis, who had become a preacher. Cassie blamed Alan for the death of her daughter Tammy, and wanted ostensibly to "protect Beth's child from having Alan Spaulding as a father." Lizzie was dismayed and angry that she hadn't been invited and was one of the last people to find out. Thinking the baby was a Bauer, Beth named the baby Bernadette as a tribute to Bert Bauer, Rick's grandmother. At Bernadette's baptism, Reva blurted out the truth to save her own son from Alan's wrath. Beth decided instead after some additional thought to rename her daughter Peyton Alexandra Raines instead of Bernadette Bauer.

Beth decided to go to law school, but her personal life remained more murky. When Alan had a brain tumor and started having visions of his dead son Gus, Beth started a relationship with Henry Cooper "Coop" Bradshaw who had been previously engaged to her daughter Lizzie. The relationship was supposed to be kept secret so Alan wouldn't find out but eventually everyone knew except Alan. When Alan found out he threatened to take Peyton from Beth and kill Coop if she didn't marry him. On the way to stop the wedding Coop got into a car accident. Phillip, who had been presumed dead for nearly five years, had recently decided to return to Springfield, and found Coop after the accident. He took him to the hospital, then went to the church to tell everyone what had happened. Beth was shocked to see Phillip alive, and then jolted to learn that Coop was clinging to life. Beth visited Coop on his deathbed, and his sacrifice made her decide not to marry Alan. During the relationship of Beth and Coop he wrote a book about their love and it was eventually published. Phillip's return jolted the entire Spaulding family, and they barely had time to adjust when Beth's and Phillip's 19-year-old son, James, returned from boarding school. James was running a Ponzi scheme and even when Phillip helped clear the charges against him, he resented Phillip's return. Beth was torn between the love of her life and the son who had only known the worst of his father. During this time Beth also helped her daughter Lizzie marry Bill Lewis.

Eventually, Phillip learned he was dying. He didn't tell anyone, aside from Lillian (who was a nurse), and tried to repair the relationships in his life with the time he had left. Beth found out in what were supposed to be Phillip's last days, and she felt devastated as well as betrayed by Phillip and by her mother. Fortunately for Phillip, Alan agreed to a bone marrow transplant, and saved his son's life, but a few days later, Alan quietly died after attending the double wedding of Lillian and Buzz Cooper and Vanessa Chamberlain and Billy Lewis. Beth was forced to break the news to her young daughter Peyton. Shortly before Alan's death, Phillip had proposed to Beth, and she had happily accepted. James and Phillip were now reconciled and Lizzie was trying for a baby. Beth also decided to return to her first love, drawing. A year later, Beth and Phillip were happily remarried, and were celebrating the upcoming nuptials of their best friends Rick and Mindy.

== Portrayers ==
Judi Evans debuted in the role in May 1983 and remained with the show until July 1986. Evans won a Daytime Emmy Award for Outstanding Supporting Actress in 1984 for her portrayal of the character.

After Lisa Loughridge stepped in as a temporary replacement, Beth Chamberlin assumed the role from October 2, 1989, to February 25, 1991, and November 1, 1997, to September 18, 2009. In 2010, Beth Chamberlin secured a nomination for Outstanding Supporting Actress.

=== Lorelei's Diary ===
Inspired by a story where the character of Beth had an alter ego, Lorelei Hills, Chamberlin wrote a novel, Lorelei's Guiding Light: An Intimate Diary. The book was published under the pen name of the Lorelei character by St. Martin's Press in 2002.
