= Ellen Weston =

American actress (1939–2026)

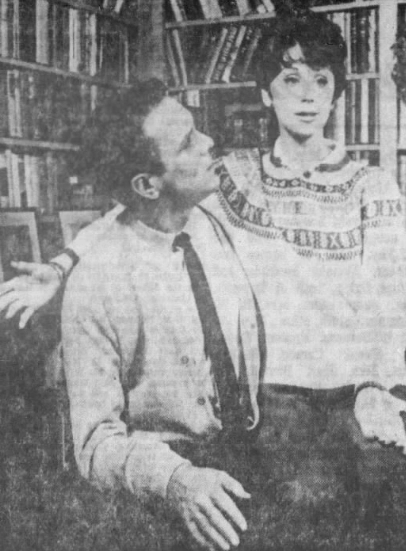
- Weston (right) with John Lasell, 1962
- Born: Ellen Rachel Weinstein; April 19, 1939; New York City, U.S.
- Died: May 28, 2026 (aged 87); Los Angeles, California, U.S.
- Occupations: Actress; producer; writer

Ellen Weston (born Ellen Rachel Weinstein; April 19, 1939 – May 28, 2026) was an American actress, songwriter, producer and writer.

== Early years ==
Born on April 19, 1939 in New York City, Weston was the daughter of educators; her mother was a teacher, and her father was a superintendent of schools. She attended Performing Arts High School, Hofstra University, New York University, and Hunter College. She completed work on her Bachelor of Arts degree two years after she dropped out to act full-time.

== Career ==
Weston's Broadway credits include Toys in the Attic, A Far Country, and Mary, Mary.

Her first notable television role was a stint as Robin Fletcher on Guiding Light from 1963 to 1964, followed by another daytime role as Karen Gregory on Another World. From 1978 to 1980, she appeared as Derek's ex-wife, Suzanne Thurston on The Young and the Restless. She portrayed Betty Harrelson in S.W.A.T. and Dr. Steele in Get Smart.

She also appeared in The Ghost and Mrs. Muir, Bonanza, Wonder Woman, Bewitched, Hawkins, and The Bob Newhart Show and in television movies such as Letters from Three Lovers (1973), Miracle on 34th Street (1973), The Questor Tapes (1974), and Revenge of the Stepford Wives (1980). The only feature film in which Weston has appeared was Dangerous Relations.

In 1972, Weston co-wrote seven songs with singer Lesley Gore for Gore's MoWest debut album Someplace Else Now. Weston also co-wrote all of the songs on Lesley's 1976 album "Love Me By Name" produced by Quincy Jones.

Her first television writing job was as a staff writer for the CBS soap opera Capitol. She was hired to write made-for-TV movies, including Lies Before Kisses, See Jane Run, The Disappearance of Vonnie, and As The Beat Goes On: The Sonny and Cher Story. She was also a producer on several of these.

In 2003, John Conboy, executive producer of Guiding Light, hired Weston — who had worked for him on The Young and the Restless and Capitol — as the head writer. Weston's central story was the Maryanne Carruthers mystery. The story brought actress Carrie Nye, a friend of Weston, back to the show. The story was criticized for its resemblance to a similar plot that Guiding Light had broadcast 20 years earlier and for the substantial revisions to history that the story made for five main characters. Weston was replaced with new head writer David Kreizman in 2004.

== Death ==
Weston died at Cedars-Sinai Medical Center in Los Angeles, California, on May 28, 2026, at the age of 87.
