= Mindy Lewis =

- Guiding Light character
- Portrayed by: Krista Tesreau (1983–1989, 2002–2009); Kimberley Simms (1989–1992, 1997); Ann Hamilton (1993); Barbara Crampton (1993–1995)
- Duration: 1983–1995; 1997; 2002; 2004; 2009
- First appearance: May 16, 1983
- Last appearance: September 18, 2009
- Created by: L. Virginia Browne and Gene Palumbo
- Introduced by: Gail Kobe (1983); Paul Rauch (1997, 2002); Ellen Wheeler (2004, 2009)
In-universe information
- Other names: Monica Brown
- Occupation: Fashion Designer; Bartender; Business Executive; Spokeswoman; Pianist
- Father: Billy Lewis
- Mother: Dina Lewis
- Stepmother: Vanessa Chamberlain
- Half-brothers: Dylan Lewis; Bill Lewis
- Spouse: Phillip Spaulding (1984); Kurt Corday (1985); Will Jeffries (1988); Nick McHenry–Spaulding (1994–1995); Rick Bauer (2010–present)
- Stepchildren: Jude Bauer; Leah Bauer
- Grandfathers: H.B. Lewis
- Grandmothers: Sally Gleason
- Uncles: Kyle Sampson; Joshua Lewis
- Aunts: Trish Lewis
- Nieces: Daisy Lemay
- First cousins: Marah Lewis; Shayne Lewis; Ben Reade
- Other relatives: Henry Cooper Lewis

Melinda Sue "Mindy" Lewis is a fictional character in the town of Springfield on the CBS daytime drama, Guiding Light, originated and, most notably, portrayed by actress, Krista Tesreau.

== Character History ==
=== 1983–1989 ===
Mindy Lewis, lovingly called "Princess" by her beloved daddy, Billy, grew up in Tulsa, Oklahoma. Mindy, whose mother died when she was only five years old, grew up spoiled and rich. Mindy came to Springfield in June 1983, with her father following very soon after. Mindy was instrumental in convincing Billy to marry Vanessa Chamberlain, whom she adored. She then started dating Phillip Spaulding, but the heir to Spaulding millions did not pay enough attention to her, so Mindy, in a ploy for attention, made it look like her horse, Boss, trampled her and landed herself in Cedars Hospital. Her roommate was Beth Raines and their new friendship set in motion the friendship between Rick, Phillip, Beth and Mindy that would henceforth be referred to as The Four Musketeers. Phillip and Rick were both smitten with Beth, but Phillip backed off and continued to date Mindy. When Mindy accidentally heard Justin and Alan talking about Phillip being not Alan's but Justin's son, she told Rick, while Beth's stepfather, Bradley Raines heard every word.

Meanwhile, Phillip and Rick planned a surprise party for Mindy on her 18th birthday at the Country Club and, while everyone was congratulating Mindy at the party, Phillip confronted Alan and Justin about his parentage (Bradley Raines had told him the truth). Later, when Beth told Mindy that Phillip was about to leave town, Mindy visited him and told him that she wanted to go with him and the pair had sex for the first time. However, Mindy did not really want to go anywhere and, to keep Phillip in town, she asked Beth to convince him to stay. While Mindy begged Rick not to tell Phillip that she had known the truth before him, Alan did and, as a result, Phillip left Mindy during a conversation at Cedars. Mindy vowed to herself to win Phillip back, and one day, she and Rick witnessed Beth and Phillip confessing their love for each other at the stables. Angry, when Mindy learned that Phillip had arranged for Beth to have a secret room at the stables where she could draw paintings, she spitefully leaked this info to Bradley. Bradley took action by threatening Phillip and raping Beth. Later, when Mindy realized Bradley's true nature, she confessed her schemes to Rick and warned Alan about Bradley. At this time, Beth left Phillip and Mindy used this to her advantage by comforting Phillip and having sex with him again. This time, she did not take her birth-control pills. Soon after, when Beth and Phillip ran off to New York, Mindy and Rick followed and formed a bond while working at Circus Underground.

In New York, a sidewalk Santa named Nick assisted Rick and Mindy in their search after Rick saved Nick's life from a heart attack. When Trudy, Rick and Mindy's boss, bought one of Beth's drawings—a portrait of Phillip as a clown—for $20, the picture led Rick and Mindy to right to Phillip and Beth. By January 1984, the group was back in Springfield and Mindy had fallen in love with Rick. Mindy discovered that she was pregnant by Phillip. Mindy told Rick the truth and he told Ed and Maureen while Mindy told her stepmother, Vanessa, and swore her to secrecy. Meanwhile, Phillip and Beth made plans for their February wedding. After Mindy changed her mind about having an abortion, Rick decided that the baby needed a father so he proposed but Mindy turned him down by saying that they were too young and not ready for marriage. Rick told Billy that he wanted to marry Mindy but Billy agreed that the pair was not ready. When Rick announced that they HAD to get married since there was a baby involved, a furious Billy went to Ed and yelled at him for not keeping a closer eye on Rick. Ed shot back that Phillip was the father, not Rick.

Billy went to the church where Beth and Phillip were about to be married and confronted Mindy about Phillip being the father of her baby. Mindy was forced to confess the truth. Beth was standing nearby and overheard and left Phillip at the altar. Meanwhile, Phillip wanted to be part of the baby's life but Mindy would only permit this if he married her. Though Phillip agreed, the marriage would dissolve, when Mindy miscarried the baby. Afterwards, Mindy became attracted to Lujack Luvonaczek, who only had eyes for Beth. So once again Mindy was thrown over for the sweet Beth. In the meantime, Rick became involved with Roxie Shayne, Mindy's old rival from Tulsa and a jealous Mindy brought Roxie's abusive boyfriend Dub Taylor to town to break them up. When Dub revealed that Mindy had brought him there, Rick was appalled and grew closer to Roxie.

In 1985, Mindy turned to shady Kyle Sampson for comfort. However, Kyle was only using Mindy to get information about Billy in order to take over Lewis Oil. When Mindy found out about his vendetta against her father, Mindy got drunk and shot Kyle in his arm. Not long after, Kyle invited the Lewises to a family dinner and, still under pressure, Mindy broke down and confessed to everyone what she had done to Kyle. To her surprise, Kyle protected her. In the meantime, when Kyle's assistant, David Preston, kidnapped Kyle and demanded $10 million, he hid the money in a juke box but Mindy found it and kept it for her own since she felt it justified all the pain Kyle caused her family. Later, Mindy was exposed and she was forced to return the money. About this time, Mindy began working at Company with Roxie and Roxie's boyfriend from Alaska, Kurt Corday. When Mindy fell in love with Kurt and planned to marry him, a jealous Rick alerted the authorities that Kurt was an illegal alien from Canada. To save Kurt from being deported, Roxie, who had married Kurt in Alaska when she was suffering from amnesia, crashed Kurt and Mindy's wedding and married Kurt herself to keep him in the country. The marriage was quickly annulled. Soon after, Billy demanded that Kurt properly propose to Mindy and give the engagement some time before having a proper wedding.

Later in the spring of 1985, June, Warren Andrews opened up a new nightclub, the Blue Orchid. After Kurt asked her to marry him, Mindy, who loved the ambience of the Blue Orchid, suggested that they have a lavish wedding there. Kurt agreed and the date was for November 1985. Mindy and Kurt had a grand wedding, with Mindy in a gorgeous gown and veil and Kurt in a tuxedo with a white coat and golden pants and white gloves, and Billy gave Mindy away. At the reception, tragedy struck when Billy, who unbeknownst to everyone had been brainwashed by the Largo Organization, pulled a gun and aimed it at Kyle. When her grandfather, H.B., called out Billy's name in the ensuing melee, David Preston was shot instead. Billy looked about to be convicted, until at the 11th hour, Suzette Saxon confessed to shooting and killing David Preston.

Later, In January 1986, Kyle started a new campaign with Jackson Freemont's help to start a new cosmetics line. Kyle, on Jackson's and Beth's advice, decided to have a beauty contest to name the new "Sampson Girl" who would advertise the cosmetics. Rivals Mindy Lewis, Roxie Shayne and Jessie Matthews all vied for the competition to be the "Sampson Girl". As with most beauty contests, there was much backstabbing, nailbiting and a little bit of backstage intrigue. Jackson prematurely created a victory poster for Beth, whom he was falling in love with. Kyle threatened Roxie about her past as a prostitute, after her father, Hawk Shayne, threatened to blackmail Kyle over his illegal ownership of Reva's former house, Reva Bend, Roxie dropped out prematurely from the contest. Mindy used her ability to sell her sexy looks to sway the votes of the judges, much to Kurt's chagrin, and the voting was close with Mindy winning the contest and being named "Sampson Girl". However, Mindy had more to lose—namely, her marriage. As the "Sampson Girl", she traveled, schmoozed and interviewed with the likes of Dick Cavett, while hubby Kurt was busy building their dream house and keeping Company running smoothly. Kurt looked forward to the day when Mindy would become a full-time wife and they could start a family. Kurt was blissfully unaware that Jackson had talked Mindy into signing a no-pregnancy clause for the next five years. Things came to a halt though when Alexandra Spaulding and Hawk Shayne, out of a mutual enmity towards Kyle, fabricated evidence that the "Sampson Girl" contest was a fraud and Mindy's name was mud.

Mindy went to the construction site of the new house, where she found Kurt and Roxie asleep in each other's arms. Mindy did not know Roxie had been helping Kurt with the house, and they had varnished themselves into a corner and had to remain there until the varnish dried. Jealous and angry, Mindy beat a hasty exit, knocking over a kerosene lamp in the process. A fire broke out, and Hawk risked his life to save Roxie and Kurt. The house was destroyed and since Hawk realized it was Mindy's fault, he blackmailed her for money for his silence. Eventually, Mindy soon realized she could not play housewife to a traditional, working-class husband and admitted to starting the fire. Afterwards, a disillusioned Kurt left to work on a Lewis Oil rig off the coast of Venezuela. Although Kurt had plans to return and to build another house with Mindy, he was killed in an explosion.

Grieving over Kurt's death, Mindy went to Cross Creek for some rest but was kidnapped and taken to a stable by a criminal named Pierce who wanted her Uncle Josh dead. Ironically, he was also member of an organization called Diamondhead who wanted to take over Lewis Oil and was also responsible for Kurt's death. Josh and Reva did not know about Mindy's kidnapping until Pierce kidnapped them as well. Luckily, Mindy ended up saving Josh and Reva by hitting Pierce with a board, sending him falling into a wildcat pit where he broke his neck. With help of Reva's little brother Rusty, whom Mindy never liked, an employee at Lewis Oil, Cat Brixton, was found to be a member of the organization and in 1987 he kidnapped Mindy and Roxie. When Cat was abusive to Mindy, Roxie saved her by attacking Cat but she had no chance and Cat beat her up until Rusty arrived to rescue them. While Roxie was injured in Cedars, Mindy realized her good nature and finally befriended her old rival. With the organization destroyed, Mindy's next chance at love was with Rusty. Later, Rusty would arrest drug user Rose McLaren and he and Mindy helped her. However, Rusty fell in love with Rose and he and Mindy broke up in 1988.

After an unsuccessful relationship with Frank Cooper, Mindy became involved with Will Jeffries, Josh's best friend who had amnesia and they impulsively married with H.B.'s blessing. Later, Will was kidnapped by Rusty, Josh and Reva prevented Mindy from seeing him. Confused, Mindy visited Billy and finally learned about Will's villainous nature. Desperate to get her back, in 1989, Will kidnapped Mindy's cousin Marah and left her with his unstable mother. About this time, Rusty's new wife, Rose, was killed. After attending Josh and Reva's wedding at Cross Creek, Mindy returned to Springfield but, to everyone's shock, she claimed that she still loved Will and even moved back in with him. Not long after, Will had the feeling that the late Rose was stalking him; he even saw her and heard her voice on the answering machine. Will almost went crazy, while Rusty realized Mindy's games. Confronted, Mindy confessed to Rusty that she was gaslighting Will to get him to confess to Rose's murder. Rusty teamed up with Mindy and they found a dead ringer for Rose named Ann and Ann unwillingly agreed to help them by pretending to be Rose.

Meanwhile, Will suddenly surprised Mindy by planning to go on a honeymoon to the hills with her. Something in his attitude startled her and Mindy suddenly realized that Will had figured out that she was gaslighting him. Will then drugged her, holding her at gunpoint at an hotel in the hills. He left a note saying "the game is over" and told Mindy that if they were not meant to be together on earth, then they would be in death. Meanwhile, Rusty, Sonni Carrerra and Josh rushed to save Mindy and, after Sonni found Mindy drugged, Rusty climbed on the balcony, whereupon Will confessed to Sonni all his crimes. As Will was about to jump over the balcony with Mindy, Rusty shot him and Will fell to his death, while Josh was able to save Mindy. Now lying unconscious in Cedars, Mindy had a vision of Kurt and Rose who convinced her to hold onto her life. Soon after, Rusty and Mindy became closer again but when Rusty was offered a job as the chief of detective's in Tulsa, Mindy did not want to follow him, so he left Springfield alone. In the meantime, the Lewis family was rocked to discover that Billy had a son, Dylan, from a one-night stand with Reva Shayne. Although Mindy was, initially, jealous of the attention Billy gave his new son, in time she and Dylan formed a close relationship.

=== 1990–1997 ===
In 1990, Mindy decided venture out on her own by becoming a fashion designer, which did not sit well with Billy because he had problems dealing with the fact that his "princess" had grown up. Later, Billy asked Mindy to spy on his nemesis, Roger Thorpe, but when Mindy did so, she fell in love with Roger despite the fact that he was married to Alexandra Spaualding. After Roger lost the Waterview Towers to Billy, Mindy let herself be seduced by him and they started a secret affair, while Mindy fell for Roger's claims that he would leave Alex for her. In the meantime, Mindy resumed her relationship with Rick. At about the same time, Mindy was shocked to learn that Phillip was on trial for Neil's murder. To Mindy's grief, Phillip then apparently died in a car accident. Later, a man named Mallet saved Mindy from a nosy reporter trying to push his way into her apartment. Mallet claimed to be writing a book about Phillip and Mindy befriended him. Soon, she learned that Mallet was actually a cop who wanted to find Phillip alive and, through the listening device that he planted in Mindy's apartment, Mallet learned of her affair with Roger. Not long after, Rick asked Mindy to marry him but, still holding out for Roger, Mindy turned him down. When it became clear that Roger was not going to divorce Alex, Mindy regretted the affair and tried to rekindle her romance with Rick. She was too late since Rick was now married to Beth, so Mindy let herself be comforted by Mallet.

Though she thought about having a future with Mallet, she still was not able to leave Roger. Later, Mindy was shocked to learn that Phillip was indeed alive and had faked his death with Beth and Rick's help. As a result, she felt insulted because she was the only of the "Four Musketeers" who had not known the truth. As 1991 began, Mindy was still carrying on with Roger and became pregnant. The stress of keeping their affair a secret became too much for Mindy and she miscarried in May. Unfortunately, the night she lost the baby, Roger was too wrapped up in his own life—mainly the revelation that Hart Jessup was his son. Disillusioned, Mindy ended her relationship with Roger for good. Mindy's worst nightmare was Billy finding out everything. That seemed a possibility when Alexandra told Mindy that she found Mindy's earring at the Spaulding mansion. Alex threatened to publicly announce the affair if Mindy ever hurt her again.

Afterwards, Mindy went to New York and almost fainted when she saw a man named Nick McHenry, since he was the spitting image of Alexandra's deceased son, Lujack. Intrigued, Mindy spoke with Nick about his double and the two shared a few dates. After a shocked Nick found a photo of Lujack, he followed Mindy to Springfield to see what he could find out about his double. As the weeks wore on, it became evident that Nick could be Lujack's twin brother, hence, Alex's son. Alex soon became obsessed with Nick and Mindy warned him that Alex would not give up until she got him. Later, Nick went back to New York for a job and, although Mindy did not want to follow him, she changed her mind but missed the plane. To Mindy's delight, Nick returned since Alex had sabotaged his job offer to keep him in town. Afterwards, Mindy and Nick had sex for the first time in the lighthouse. Alex caught them and kept her promise by publicly humiliating Mindy and revealing her affair with Roger. Billy beat up Roger and disowned Mindy but they reconciled after H.B. intervened. As for Nick, he stood by Mindy and they became engaged in February 1992. By this time the evidence was growing that Nick could be a Spaulding when Alex's old lover, Eric Luvonaczek, arrived and claimed to be Nick's father. Nick still refused to believe it and, after Mindy pleaded with him, Eric confessed that he lied because Alex paid him to and left town. However, later, Eric confessed to Mindy in a letter that Nick was in fact a Spaulding and he let her decide if she would tell Nick the truth. Mindy kept quiet and, after finding a photo of Nick's adoptive-mother Mary McHenry just before Nick's birth that showed she was definitely not pregnant, she erased the date on it with to protect Nick from the truth. Meanwhile, Eric had left a blood sample in Cedars for a DNA test and, to Mindy's shock, Nick agreed to do the test to get rid of Alex.

Scared that Alex would do everything in her power to break them up, a desperate Mindy broke into Cedars and changed the results to show that Alex was not Nick's mother. At this point, Roger wanted to make peace with Mindy and although she refused at first, she changed her mind when Roger publicly turned against the Spauldings. In addition, Mindy wanted to get pregnant by Nick but did not succeed. One day at the beach, Mindy met an unknown woman and befriended her, and saw the same woman again on a party at the Blue Moon. Mindy learned that the woman was an old friend's of Nick from Cambrai named Eve Guthrie. In the meantime, Mindy got a letter from Eric who wanted to come to Mindy and Nick's wedding since he thought that Mindy had told Nick the truth. A panicked Mindy burned the letter but Dylan caught her and tried to get her to tell Nick everything. Mindy scratched the white out off Mary's photo to get the date back, but just as she was about to tell Nick the truth, Eve interrupted and convinced Nick to go to Cambrai to save her husband, Paul. Finally, on the day of their wedding, Nick did not show up and Alex confronted Mindy and convinced Mindy that Nick had left her to be with Eric in Paris because he had learned about her schemes. Alex also had Mary's photo and since the Spaulding Jet returned without Nick, Mindy thought that he had left her. Unable to face him, Mindy wrote Nick a letter in which she confessed everything, she returned her engagement ring in the envelope and left Springfield without a trace.

At the end of the year, Dylan went to New York with his girlfriend, Julie Camaletti, and, on New Year's 1993, he met with Mindy who was now working for a designer named Matt Weiss. Though Mindy refused to come home, she relented after quitting her job after an argument with Weiss. Back in town, Mindy was relieved to learn that Alex had left. Believing she might still have a chance with Nick, Mindy rushed to the boathouse and was shocked to see him with Eve. After they were finally able to talk, a few days later, Mindy confessed that she wanted to get him back but Nick was committed to Eve. Later, Nick informed Mindy that the reason he was late for their wedding was because Roger had Nick arrested in Cambrai. Convinced that she had lost Nick, Mindy did her best to keep her distance but substances threw them together at every turn. Finally, although Nick was still angry at Mindy, he kissed her one evening in the club, only to make her clear that Eve belonged in his life now. Then one day, Mindy threw a party at the lighthouse with Nick and Eve attending and after the party, Mindy was shocked to find all pictures of her and Nick destroyed in her bedroom. She immediately blamed Eve for the crime but Eve denied it and they both blamed each other of being crazy. Nick stood by Eve and Eve continued to harass Mindy by telling her that, unlike Mindy, she was able to bear Nick's kids. In response, an angry Mindy threw a bucket at Eve but Eve told Nick a different story and Nick believed Eve's claims that Mindy smashed Eve's windshield with her own shovel. As a result, a hurt Mindy wanted nothing more to do with Nick. Not long after, Mindy organized a bridal fashion show to mark her return as a designer and the show was a big success. However, while driving home with Bill, Mindy suddenly passed out and drove her car into the tree.

Luckily, both were unhurt and, although alcohol was found in her blood, Mindy knew that she had only drunk water. Meanwhile, Nick had left Eve but soon returned to her, to Mindy's dismay. However, Nick only went back to Eve in an effort to help Mindy because Nick himself had come to the realization that Eve was obsessed with Mindy and needed help. Eve acted and dressed like Mindy and had broken into Mindy's medical records as well. In fact, Eve was the one who had drugged Mindy's bottle of water and manipulated her blood results so that alcohol would be found. Eve overheard Nick telling Mindy the truth and went crazy. One evening during a storm, Eve hid in Mindy's closet and when she was about to cut the hair off a sleeping Mindy, Mindy woke up and Eve knocked her out during their fight. Nick, who was searching for Eve, found Mindy but Eve injected with a drug and threatened to jump off the observation deck, until Ed Bauer talked her down. Now Eve went to a psychiatric center for treatment and Mindy, at Ed's urging, did not press charges against her.

Though Mindy no longer believed in a future with Nick, after a few weeks, they reunited. After Eve was released from the sanatorium, Nick caught Mindy's ire by trying to help Eve start a new life. Mindy still saw Eve as a threat in their lives and Nick's willingness to help her lead to many arguments until Nick decided they should separate for a while. At the same time, Mindy befriended cop Macauley "Mac" West, who had once investigated the murder of a man named Davenport for which an innocent David Grant had been imprisoned. Since David was now wanted for the murder of Vinnie Morrison, Nick investigated to help David while he warned Mindy about Mac. Mindy was certain that Nick was only jealous until she learned that Mac was apparently in touch with Vinnie's uncle who wanted avenge for Vinnie's murder. As a result, Mindy cooperated with Nick to get information against Mac, even helping Nick to break into Mac's apartment. In the end, it was discovered that Mac was covering for his old girlfriend, Norrie Ryan. After Nick found Norrie and the police finally resolved the case, Mac confessed to Mindy that he had fallen in love with her and asked her to move with him to Chicago but Mindy refused. After Mac left, Mindy and Nick reunited. Not long after, Alex returned to town. Although they still could not stand each other, Mindy tried to make peace with Alex for Nick's sake and let her stay at the boat house since Alex was homeless after Jenna Bradshaw and Roger had taken over Spaulding.

Not long after, Mindy and Nick got engaged and Alex apparently accepted it. Although Alex did attend Mindy and Nick's engagement party at the Country Club, she made a public scene by provoking and arguing with Roger. That same night, Roger would be shot. The police, and Mindy, believed that Alex had shot Roger. Mindy was, especially, convinced since she knew that Alex had had blood on her dress. In January 1994, Mindy lost her home, the lighthouse, after a killer named Ray had started a fire there to kill her friend Tangie Hill and Bill (but Josh saved them). As a result, Mindy and Nick had to move into the Spaulding house. In addition, Alex gave Nick Jenna's half of WSPR. Mindy disapproved of Alex's influence at Nick and she and Alex continued to argue. Meanwhile, to Mindy's shock, Billy was suddenly arrested for the attempted murder of Roger. Later, Nick showed Mindy Billy's weapon that he had found in Mindy's bag and Mindy was shocked to learn that Billy had started drinking again, a fact Nick had known already. Mindy was also shock to learn that Beth knew too, and Mindy was now at a cross-roads with her best friend. Later, the Lewis family was shocked when Billy confessed to shooting Roger to prevent him of taking away his adoptive-son Peter. Mindy tearfully said good-bye to her daddy and she and Nick finally became husband and wife.

While dealing with living at the Spaulding mansion with Alexandra, Mindy also had to deal with the custody trial between Vanessa and Bridget for Peter Lewis. Upset that Vanessa divorced Billy to have a better chance at getting custody of her adoptive son, Mindy, nonetheless, supported Vanessa by breaking into Ross Marler's office to steal papers regarding the custody case. Later, to everyone's delight, Vanessa and Bridget finally agreed to share custody of Peter. In the meantime, Mindy and Alex's relationship continued to be strained and, after Mindy returned from a business trip to Milan, she talked Nick into letting Dylan build them their own house. Meanwhile, Mindy felt neglected by Nick because of his job at Spaulding and decided that they should adopt a baby. In the meantime, Mindy became concerned that corporate intrigue at Spaulding had changed Nick. Soon the marriage became strained and Mindy moved out. Finally, in 1995, the adoption agency wrote that the couple had been approved to adopt a little girl. Although Mindy was still insecure of her future with Nick, she agreed to have the baby and moved back to the Spaulding house with him, this time surprisingly with Alex urging Nick to fight to keep the marriage together. Mindy then became obsessed by the preparation for the baby. Nick noticed this and lied to Mindy that there case had been rejected after a case worker visit. Brokenhearted, Mindy confessed to Nick that she had only returned to him because of the baby and that she no longer loved him. Later, Mindy asked the case worker, Mrs. DeWitt, why they were rejected and was shocked to learn that Nick himself had called her off. Although angry, Mindy realized that it was the best this way and she and Nick officially parted ways but remained friends. Some months later, Eve died of an illness and Rick confessed to Mindy that Ed actually turned off her life support machines and he was covering for him. Shocked, Mindy feared that she had been called to testify and left Springfield to start a new life in Paris.

In 1997, Mindy briefly returned to Springfield, along with most of the Lewis family, to mourn their beloved HB. She also reunited with Billy, for the first time after his release from prison, and gave him advice on his feelings for Cassie Layne before returning to France. Mindy was occasionally mentioned by longtime friends Phillip and Rick, and was credited with Marah's makeover when Marah came back from a Paris visit in 1999.

=== 2002-2009 ===
After an absence of 5 years, Mindy came back for a brief visit, in 2002, to attend Josh and Reva's third wedding. There she shared a bittersweet dance with old flame Frank. While in town, she also met Rick's new bride, Mel, and participated in a long-overdue Four Musketeers reunion at Rick's hospital bedside. Later that year, Mindy returned again and, after checking in with brother Bill and being shocked by his relationship with Beth, she revealed that she was in town to attend, along with all of Phillip's other ex-wives, the board meeting to determine whether Alexandra or Alan would control Spaulding Enterprises. As she and Phillip had remained close over the years, he was surprised when she voted for Alex, but understood when he realized that Alex had been blackmailing her with compromising photographs. After saying goodbye to Phillip, Mindy left after giving a final warning to all the other exes to never trust Alex under any circumstances.

In 2004, Mindy contacted Marah with fantastic news. Apparently, Mindy showed some designers in Paris Marah's designs and one of them was interested in hiring her. Ecstatic, Marah accepted Mindy's offer to stay with her in Paris. Later that year, Mindy returned to Springfield for a solemn occasion—Phillip's funeral. With the Four Musketeers down to three, Mindy, Rick and Beth reminisced about the Phillip they knew and loved, not the ruthless man that he became just prior to his death. While in town, Mindy clashed with her sister-in-law, Olivia Spencer, when a tipsy Olivia, another one of Phillip's ex-wives, starting making disparaging remarks about Phillip.

In 2009, Mindy returned to Springfield for her high school reunion. By this point, Phillip had returned to town and was back to his old self. At the reunion, Mindy announced that they were going to recreate a moment from their class and had Philip and Beth crowned King and Queen of the Prom. Though both Rick and Mindy wondered if Phillip was truly alright, they continued to treat him as a friend—something that Phillip noticed and thanked them for. Mindy returned again to town to attend the annual Bauer BBQ and Bill's wedding to Phillip's daughter, Lizzie. Months later, Mindy returned for another very happy occasion—Billy's marriage to Vanessa. At the wedding, Mindy thrilled Billy with the news that she was moving to Springfield permanently. By the following year, Mindy was celebrating her own wedding to one of her oldest and dearest friends—Rick.

== Actor history ==
- Krista Tesreau (May 16, 1983 to April 1989; June 7 to 11, 2002; October 16 to 18, 2002; November 16 to 18, 2004; March 6, 2009 to September 18, 2009)
- Kimberley Simms (July 10, 1989 to June 29, 1992; September 11 to 18, 1997)
- Ann Hamilton (January 4, 1993 to April 27, 1993)
- Barbara Crampton (April 29, 1993 to May 26, 1995)

== Sources ==
- Mindy Lewis - Soapcentral.com
