= Krista Tesreau =

American actress

- Occupation: Actress
- Years active: 1983–present

Krista Tesreau is an American actress.

== Career ==
Tesreau is best known for her role as Melinda “Mindy” Lewis on the CBS soap opera Guiding Light, which she portrayed from 1983 to 1989. In 1987 Tesreau was nominated for a Daytime Emmy Award for Outstanding Ingenue for the role, and received a Soap Opera Digest Award nomination in 1988.

Tesreau also played Andie Klein on Santa Barbara from August 20, 1992, to January 15, 1993, and "whirling dervish" Tina Lord on One Life to Live from July 6, 1994, to January 24, 1997. She returned to Guiding Light as Mindy briefly in 2002, 2004, and again starting March 6, 2009.
