= David Kreizman =

American writer (born 1974)

David Kreizman (born 1974) is an American writer known for his work on television soap operas. He is a graduate of the University of Virginia. He was signed as a head writer at World Wrestling Entertainment (WWE) from March 21, 2013, to August 15, 2014. He is the founder of Gen Z Media. His debut book "The Year They Fell" was published in 2019.

Kreizman was a member of the writing team for the CBS Daytime soap opera Guiding Light since the late 1990s. In 2004, he was promoted to the position of Head Writer by newly appointed Executive Producer Ellen Wheeler. He replaced writer Ellen Weston. Much was made of Kreizman's age, 29, at the time of his appointment as Head Writer.

In July 2009, Kreizman accepted the position of Co-Head Writer at another CBS soap opera, As the World Turns. After As the World Turns's cancellation was announced, he became Co-Head Writer of All My Children in March, 2010. He and co-head writer Donna Swajeski would share those duties until they were both replaced a year later.

== Guiding Light ==
Under Kreizman's watch, several new stories were introduced, most notably the introduction of Reva Lewis's illegitimate son Jonathan Randall, who proved to be much darker and volatile than many previous GL characters. The story engendered further controversy with Jonathan's actions; before anyone realized his true identity, he seduced his cousin Tammy, which initially caused her much anguish after his identity was revealed. The story wandered into further controversy when Tammy and Jonathan became a couple. Kreizman also created Josh and Cassie as a married couple, despite a huge Josh/Reva fan following.

=== Ratings ===
GL reached a record low of 2,009,000 viewers for the week of May 30, 2008. Its previous lows were 2,025,000 viewers (week of July 13, 2007), and 2,080,000 viewers (week of May 1, 2008). Ratings continued to slide for most soap operas into 2009, including Guiding Light, which set a new record low viewership of 1,810,000 for the week of June 8, 2009. However, Kreizman and his team won the Daytime Emmy Award for Outstanding Writing in a Drama Series, and the serial tied for Outstanding Drama Series in 2007. It is difficult to determine the effect of Kreizman's writing on the final ratings because the show adopted a radical new production model in 2008 that divided opinion among viewers. When Kreizman took over as head writer in 2004, the show was already facing budget cuts and the threat of cancellation, and lasted several more years after that.

== Other writing projects ==
He and several other writers launched Gen Z Media, and are part of the creative team of Six Minutes, a new scripted audio podcast aimed at young listeners. The Unexplainable Disappearance of Mars Patel won a Peabody Award in 2016. Former daytime scribe Tom Casiello is a writer on the show.

Kreizman is also the author of the young adult novel The Year They Fell.

== Personal life ==
Kreizman's parents are Ira and Joan Kreizman. Ira Kreizman is a superior court judge in Freehold, New Jersey, and Joan is a school principal. Kreizman married Natasha Katzive, an associate director on Guiding Light, on April 15, 2000. He has three children with Natasha, Dashiell, Fiona and Oliver.

== Positions held ==
=== WWE ===
- Head writer: March 21, 2013 – August 15, 2014

=== All My Children ===
- Co-head writer (with Donna Swajeski): March 15, 2010 - April 1, 2011 (first air date: May 12, 2010; last air date: June 24, 2011)

=== As the World Turns ===
- Co-head writer (with Jean Passanante): July 8, 2009 - March 2010 (first air date October 6, 2009; last air date June 4, 2010)

=== Days of our Lives ===
- Script writer: (November 11, 2016 – present)

=== General Hospital ===
- Breakdown writer/Script writer: October 24, 2011 – May 9, 2012

=== Guiding Light ===
- Co head writer: August 22, 2008 – September 18, 2009
- Head writer: (July 6, 2004 - February 29, 2008; April 14, 2008 – August 21, 2008)
- Associate head writer: (2001 – July 5, 2004)
- Script writer: (1999–2000)
- Assistant to the producer: (1997–1998)
- Production coordinator: (1995–1996)
- Production intern: (1995)

=== Spyder Games ===
- Writer: 2001

== Awards and nominations ==
Daytime Emmy Awards

- Win (2007, Best Writing, Guiding Light)
- Nominations: (1999, 2003, 2008, Best Writing, Guiding Light, and 2010, 2011, Best Writing, As The World Turns)

Writers Guild Of America Award

- Win (2010 season; As the World Turns - shared with Susan Dansby, Lucky Gold, Janet Iacobuzio, Penelope Koechl, Leah Laiman, David A. Levinson, Leslie Nipkow, Jean Passanante, Gordon Rayfield, and David Smilow)
- Win (2004 season; Guiding Light)
- Nominations: (1998, 2001, 2002 season; Guiding Light)

Peabody Awards 2017.
