= Mike Opelka =

American radio broadcaster

- Born: Michael Vincent Opelka; July 9, 1957 (age 69); Chicago, Illinois, U.S.
- Education: Trinity University
- Spouse: Donna Marie Swajeski
- Family: Reilly Opelka (nephew)
- Presenting career
- Stations: WPHT, WILM
- Country: United States
- Website: Pure Opelka

Mike Opelka (born July 9, 1957) is an American radio broadcaster and television producer, in Houston, New York, Delaware, and nationally.

== Early life ==
Opelka was born in the South Side section of Chicago, back when it was a "dicey area". As a big sports fan, he and his brothers would skip "school for opening day at Wrigley Field." They would compete to be their "dad’s plus one for Bears games.”

Wanting out of Chicago, his father moved the family to Glenview, Illinois, where Opelka attended Catholic schools. Despite moving to the "north shore", he has remained faithful to Chicago-area sports team, e.g., the White Sox, Bulls, Blackhawks, and Bears.

As the "runt of the litter", Opelka used humor as a defense in his family. “My older brothers and my sense of humor were the only things that saved me from getting my ass kicked all the time,” he says. His grandfather taught Opelka about comedy. "He took me aside each New Year’s Eve and we’d watch the Marx Brothers and W.C. Fields movies.”

== Goya Foods protest ==
Opelka initiated a "buy-cott" of Goya Foods products in July 2020 after their CEO, Robert Unanue, of Goya Foods was criticized for praising U.S. President Donald Trump at a Hispanic Prosperity Initiative event held at the White House. Former HUD secretary Julian Castro and others called for a boycott of Goya Food products following Unanue's remarks.

Opelka's brother came up with the idea to encourage people to purchase $10 worth of Goya products and donate them to local food banks. Opelka claims to be trying to fight anger with love. With the enormous response to his appeal, he said, "It looks like love is winning and that's really what this is about, taking a negative and turning it into a positive that works for the employees of Goya and the people who need food right now."

== Shows ==
In the early-1980s, Opelka was hired by Houston’s 93 Q’s Morning Zoo as a writer. He also did comedy bits and parodies for them. “I did a pretty good Bill Murray voice," he says.

Opelka's show Pure Opelka airs on WILM in Wilmington, Delaware, and he hosts a show on WPHT every Saturday night from 8-11pm. Starting in April 2018, he began co-hosting the Angie Austin & Mike Opelka Show, nationally syndicated and on demand via Genesis Communications Network). He now guests hosts on other radio shows, including that of Chris Plante on WMAL-FM and Rich Zeoli on WPHT. In his self-styled role as “America’s Guest Host,” Opelka also sits in for Joe "Pags" Pagliarulo, Simon Conway, and Mike Broomhead in Phoenix.

Mike Opelka currently works as a regular fill-in host on several syndicated radio talk shows heard daily across the country. From Chris Plante, Joe Pags and Simon Conway to local stars like Rich Zeoli in Philly, Drew Steele in Ft Myers, FL and Mike Broomhead in Phoenix t

Opelka takes nominations for the "woke olympics" during his shows. He gained attention for his "bashing" of President Joe Biden for his priorities, saying via Twitter, “Our @POTUS has not found time to visit Waukesha and meet with the families destroyed by the (accused) murderer & racist who mowed down dozens,” but “He did make it to MN to sell his massive (spending) bill . .”

His first agent was Korean-born but had been adopted by an Orthodox Jewish family from Brooklyn. “He sounded like Gilbert Godfried but looked like a relative of Kim Jong-un,” recalls Opelka. Asked by his agent to pitch television show concepts for the FX Network Fox was developing, Opelka proposed five ideas and they bought three. So he spent the next three and a half years making television content for FOX and FX before returning to radio, which he prefers. “Television is a less forgiving environment,” Opelka says. “Radio is more like family. You can trust people.” As producer and actor, he is known for Personal FX: The Collectibles Show (1994), Sgt. Kabukiman N.Y.P.D. (1990), and Fox After Breakfast (1996).

He constructed a home studio in 2018.

== The Blaze ==
Opelka worked at The Blaze as an editor/writer for seven years before being laid off in August 2017 when they downsized.

== Personal life ==
Opelka has been married to screenwriter Donna Swajeski since February 29, 1992, and lives with her in Arden, Delaware, a village outside Wilmington. They moved from New York City to Delaware when his in-laws were ill, subsequently taking the Acela high-speed train daily into the city. Opelka grew up with fellow radio show host Chris Plante in Glenview, Illinois. His older brother Gregg, composer and lyricist for stage musicals, is a contributor to the Wall Street Journal.

Professional tennis player Reilly Opelka is his nephew.
