= Guiding Light =

American radio and television soap opera

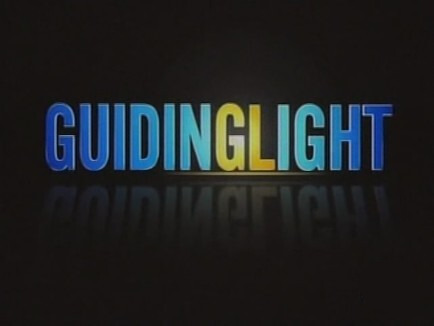
- Also known as: The Guiding Light (original name); GL
- Genre: Soap opera
- Created by: Irna Phillips; Emmons Carlson
- Written by: Christopher Dunn; Lloyd Gold; Jill Lorie Hurst; David Kreizman; Tita Bell; Kimberly Hamilton; Rebecca Hanover; David Rupel; Donna Swajeski; Ellen Weston; Brett Staneart; Casandra Morgan; Penelope Koechl; David Smilow; Gillian Spencer
- Directed by: Bruce S. Barry; Joe Cotugno; Rob Decina; Matthew Lagle; Brian Mertes; Adam Reist; Robert Scinto; Jo Anne Sedwick; Susan Strickler; Ellen Wheeler; Karen Wilkens
- Starring: Series cast
- Country of origin: United States
- Original language: English
- No. of seasons: NBC and CBS: 19 (radio); CBS: 57 (television; includes four years on both TV and radio); Total: 72
- No. of episodes: NBC and CBS-Radio: 2,500 (radio); CBS: 15,762 (radio [1952–1956] & TV [1952–2009]); Total: 18,262

Production
- Executive producers: Lucy Ferri Rittenberg (1952–1975); Allen M. Potter (1976–1982); Gail Kobe (1982–1986); Joe Willmore (1986–1989); Robert Calhoun (1989–1991); Jill Farren Phelps (1991–1995); Michael Laibson (1995–1996); Paul Rauch (1996–2002); John Conboy (2002–2004); Ellen Wheeler (2004–2009)
- Producers: Alexandra Johnson-Gamsey; Maria Macina; Jan Conklin; Christopher Cullen; Janet Morrison
- Production locations: Chicago, Illinois (1937–1947); Los Angeles, California (1947–1949); New York City, New York (1949–2009)
- Running time: 15 minutes (1937–1968); 30 minutes (1968–1977); 60 minutes (1977–2009)
- Production companies: Procter & Gamble Productions (1952–2008); TeleNext Media, Inc. (2008–2009)

Original release
- Network: NBC/CBS Radio
- Release: January 25, 1937 – June 29, 1956
- Network: CBS
- Release: June 30, 1952 – September 18, 2009

Related
- Another World

Guiding Light (also known as The Guiding Light before 1975) is an American daytime soap opera. It aired for 57 years on television between June 30, 1952, and September 18, 2009, but it began even earlier as a radio serial on January 19, 1937. With 72 years of radio and television runs, it is the longest-running American soap opera, ahead of General Hospital. (Note: By number of episodes: In terms of total duration, at 13,763 hours, As the World Turns was longer than Guiding Light, at 3,940 hours 30 minutes.)

When the show debuted on radio in 1937, it centered on Reverend John Ruthledge and people whose lives revolved around him. The "Guiding Light" in the show's title originally referred to the lamp in Ruthledge's study that people used as a sign for them to find his help when needed. When the show transitioned to television in the 1950s, the Bauers, a German immigrant family first introduced in 1948, became the focus of the program. Other core families were introduced over the show's run, including the Norrises in the 1960s; the Marlers and the Spauldings in the 1970s; and the Coopers, the Lewises, and the Reardons in the 1980s.

Guiding Light was created by Irna Phillips and Emmons Carlson and began as an NBC Radio serial on January 25, 1937. On June 2, 1947, the series was transferred to CBS Radio, before starting on June 30, 1952, on CBS Television. It continued to be broadcast on radio until June 29, 1956. The series was expanded from 15 minutes to a half-hour during 1968 (and also switched from broadcasting live to pre-taping around this same time), and then to a full hour on November 7, 1977. The series broadcast its 15,000th television episode on September 6, 2006.

Although Guiding Light was the longest-scripted program in broadcasting history during the time, CBS canceled the series on April 1, 2009, after many years of declining ratings. The show taped its final scenes on August 11, 2009, and its final episode would air on the network on September 18, 2009.

== Origins, plot development, and cast ==
Guiding Light has had a number of plot sequences during the series' long history, on both radio and television. These plot sequences include complex storylines, and different writers and casting.

=== 1930s and 1940s ===
The series was created by Emmons Carlson and Irna Phillips, who based it on personal experiences. After giving birth to a still-born baby at age 19, Phillips found spiritual comfort listening to the radio sermons of Preston Bradley, a famous Chicago preacher and founder of the People's Church, a church which promoted the brotherhood of man. These sermons inspired the creation of The Guiding Light, which began as a radio series, with a minister as the central character. The original radio series was first broadcast as 15-minute episodes on NBC Radio, starting on January 25, 1937. The series was transferred to CBS Radio in 1947.

=== 1950s ===
The Guiding Light was broadcast first by CBS Television on June 30, 1952, replacing the canceled soap opera The First Hundred Years. These episodes were also 15 minutes long. During the period from 1952 to 1956, The Guiding Light existed as both a radio and television serial, with actors recording their performances twice for each day that the shows were broadcast. The radio broadcast of The Guiding Light ceased production during 1956, ending this overlap.

With the transition to television, the main characters became the Bauers, a lower-middle class German immigrant family who were first introduced in the radio serial in 1948. Many storylines revolved around Bill Bauer (son of patriarch Friedrich "Papa" Bauer) and his new wife Bertha (nicknamed "Bert"). Papa Bauer, who came to the United States during World War I with just a few dollars in his pocket, was a salt of the earth character who succeeded in offering opportunities to his children by working hard, and he instilled that work ethic into his children. Bert had dreams of climbing the social ladder and keeping up appearances, and it was up to Bill (and sometimes Papa Bauer) to bring her down to earth.

The Guiding Light ranked as the number one-rated soap opera during both 1956 and 1957, before being replaced during 1958 by As the World Turns. After Irna Phillips was transferred to As the World Turns during 1958, her protégé Agnes Nixon became head writer of The Guiding Light.

The first television producer of The Guiding Light was Lucy Ferri Rittenberg, who produced the show for over 20 years.

=== 1960s ===
Agnes Nixon relinquished her role as chief writer during 1965 to work on Another World. On March 13, 1967, The Guiding Light was first broadcast in color. On September 9, 1968, the program was expanded from 15 to 30 minutes.

The 1960s featured the introduction of Black characters, played by Billy Dee Williams, James Earl Jones, Ruby Dee, and Cicely Tyson. The emphasis of the series shifted to Bill and Bert's children, Mike and Ed; the character of Bill Bauer was written out in July 1969, presumed dead after a plane crash. The show also became a bit more topical during the 1960s, with such storylines as Bert Bauer's diagnosis of uterine cancer in 1962.

A number of new characters were introduced during the mid- to late 1960s, including Dr. Sara McIntyre, who remained a major character through the early 1980s.

=== 1970s ===
Much of the story during the first half of the 1970s was dominated by Stanley Norris' November 1971 murder and the subsequent trial, as well as the exploits of villainesses Charlotte Waring and Kit Vested. Charlotte (at the time played by Melinda Fee) was murdered by Kit (Nancy Addison) on August 26, 1973. The following year, Kit was shot by Joe Werner (Anthony Call) in self-defense on April 24, 1974, after she had attempted to poison Sara McIntyre.

Roger Thorpe was introduced on April 1, 1971, and became a pivotal character. The role of Roger was originally proposed to be a blond, fair-skinned, preppy type, a man who was dating his boss's daughter Holly. Ultimately, Michael Zaslow, a dark-haired actor, was hired for the role instead by long-time casting director, Betty Rea. Zaslow portrayed Roger as a complicated and multifaceted villain.

Cast member Theo Goetz, who played Papa Bauer, died in 1972. Producers decided that Papa Bauer would die onscreen. The cast paid tribute to Goetz and Papa Bauer in a special memorial episode which aired on February 27, 1973.

Pressured by newer, more youth-oriented soap operas such as All My Children, Procter & Gamble hired head writers Bridget and Jerome Dobson in 1975, who started writing in November. The Dobsons introduced a more nuanced, psychologically layered writing style, and included timely story lines, including a complex love/hate relationship between estranged spouses/step-siblings Roger and Holly. They also introduced several new characters, including Rita Stapleton, whose complex relationships with Roger and Ed propelled much of the story for the remainder of the decade, as well as mogul Alan Spaulding and brash lawyer Ross Marler.

In 1977, the character of Bill Bauer was reintroduced. GL had told a story where Bill died in an airplane crash in July 1969, so his reappearance was a surprise. Bill was subsequently charged for a murder of a man in Vancouver (he was acquitted, with Mike's help) and by April 1978 Bill had left town again. The character of Bill returned briefly in November 1978, April 1980, and then again in July and November 1983. Bill's return introduced the audience and the Bauers to another character that stayed on the show until September 1984, Hillary Kincaid, R. N. (Bauer), Bill's daughter, and thus Ed and Mike's half-sister. (Bill had accidentally killed the man that Hillary originally thought was her father, but was actually her step-father.)

Jerome and Bridget Dobson killed off the show's young heroine, Leslie Jackson Bauer Norris Bauer, in June 1976, when Lynne Adams left the show. Leslie was killed in a hit and run accident by Spence Jeffries, estranged husband of Mike's secretary Anne. Her father, Steve Jackson, remained on the show for the remainder of the 1970s, serving as a senior physician at Cedars, and as a friend and companion to Bert Bauer.

In November 1975, the name was changed in the show's opening and closing visuals from The Guiding Light to Guiding Light. On November 7, 1977, the show expanded to a full hour and was broadcast from 2:30 to 3:30 pm daily.

=== 1980s ===
Bridget and Jerome Dobson moved on to the head writing duties of As the World Turns in late 1979. Former actor Douglas Marland assumed the writing reins of Guiding Light in 1979. He introduced many new characters, including the Reardon family. During May 1980, Guiding Light won its first Outstanding Drama Series Daytime Emmy. One of Marland's stories featured the character of Carrie Todd Marler, played by Jane Elliot. Carrie was diagnosed with multiple personalities. Marland had barely delved into her psychosis when Elliot's contract was abruptly terminated by Executive Producer Allen M. Potter in 1982. As a result, Marland resigned in protest.

During the early 1980s, the show began to emphasize younger characters more, as an attempt to compete with the younger-skewing ABC serials. A number of longtime characters were eliminated during this time, including Ben and Eve McFarren, Diane Ballard, Dr. Sara McIntyre, Adam Thorpe, Barbara Norris Thorpe, Justin Marler and Steve Jackson. Actress Lenore Kasdorf quit the show in 1981, and producers decided not to recast the role of Rita Stapleton Bauer, given how popular Kasdorf had been. The Bauer family matriarch, Bertha 'Bert' Bauer, died in March 1986, following the real-life death of Charita Bauer in 1985. During Guiding Light's 50th anniversary year in 1987, a commitment was pledged to showcase the Bauer family in primary roles as much as possible, after audience reaction to the Oklahoma-bred Lewis and Shayne families turned out to be mixed. As a result, the tradition of the Bauer July 4 family barbecue began that year, and continued until 2009, the serial's final year on CBS Television.

Pam Long, actress and writer for NBC's Texas from 1981 to 1982, became head writer during 1983, joined by Gail Kobe as executive producer. During Long's first stint as writer, the show shifted focus to the young love quadrangle of Rick Bauer, Phillip Spaulding, Mindy Lewis, and Beth Raines. Bauer, Spaulding, Reardon, and Raines families. Long also introduced several other characters, including Alexandra Spaulding, played by notable daytime actress Beverlee McKinsey, of Another World and Texas fame; and Reva Shayne, played by Kim Zimmer. After a break, Pamela K. Long returned for a second head writer stint from 1987 to 1990.

The characters of Roger Thorpe and Holly Norris returned to the series during the late 1980s. Maureen Garrett reprised her role of Holly in 1988, followed by Michael Zaslow as Roger in 1989.

=== 1990s ===
With the new decade, the series' storytelling transitioned from Long's homespun style to a more realistic style with a new group of chief writers. The Bauer, Spaulding, Lewis, and Cooper families had been established as core families, and most major plot developments concerned them. The show generally held on in the middle of the pack as far as ratings went throughout the decade.

The show experienced a series of challenges in 1993, including the exit of three of the show's leading actresses – Beverlee McKinsey, Kimberley Simms, and Sherry Stringfield – within the space of a few months. In particular, McKinsey's Alexandra had been a catalyst for several stories. The decision to kill off the character of Maureen Bauer proved deeply unpopular with the audience, and is often cited as one of the show's biggest mistakes.

Executive producer Jill Farren Phelps cast a number of actors she'd worked with at other shows, particularly at Santa Barbara, in new roles at GL. Among them: Justin Deas, in the role of long lost Cooper patriarch Buzz; and Marj Dusay as the new actress to play Alexandra Spaulding.

In 1994, the show brought former Santa Barbara actress Marcy Walker to the canvas to play antiheroine Tangie Hill, but the pairing of Tangie with Josh Lewis proved unpopular, and Walker decided not to renew her contract

In 1995, Guiding Light brought back fan favorite Nola Chamberlain, played by Lisa Brown. However, Nola returning to the canvas on her own without husband Quinton Chamberlain was unpopular with viewers. Soap opera veteran Mary Stuart joined the cast in 1996 as Meta Bauer (though referred to many times over the years, the character originally played by Ellen Demming had not been seen onscreen since 1974); the character remained on the show until Stuart's death during 2002.

As the decade progressed, Guiding Light began to feature stories with more outlandish plot twists, seemingly to compete with shows like Passions and Days of Our Lives. A number of these stories involved the character of Reva Shayne, played by Kim Zimmer. Reva had been presumed dead for the previous five years, after having driven her car off of a bridge and into the water off the Florida Keys.

The outlandish plots for Reva included her time as an amnesiac Amish woman, the former queen of San Cristobel, and a story where Reva experienced time travel. The most notable of these plot twists was when Josh, believing again that Reva had died, had her cloned.

=== 2000s ===
The 2000s began with the division of the show into two locales: Springfield and the fictional island nation of San Cristobel. In Springfield, the Santos mob dynasty created much of the drama. Meanwhile, the royal Winslow family had their own series of intrigues with which to deal. During 2002, however, San Cristobel was eliminated from the series and the mob's influence in the story was subsequently diminished and, with the departure of character Danny Santos during 2005, eliminated altogether. Also, Guiding Light celebrated its 50th anniversary as a television show on June 30, 2002.

During 2004, former director and actress Ellen Wheeler (Emmy Award winner as an actress for the series All My Children and Another World) took over as executive producer of Guiding Light. She and writer David Kreizman made numerous changes to the sets, stories, and the cast. Several veteran actors were eliminated, mainly because of budget decreases. Because of the lack of veteran influence, Wheeler reemphasized the youth of Springfield, especially the controversial pairing of cousins Jonathan and Tammy.

During 2006, an episode featured character Harley Cooper gaining heroic abilities. The episode was semi-continued in an 8-page story in select Marvel Comics productions.

The series had its 70th broadcast anniversary during 2007. The anniversary was commemorated with the initiation of website FindYourLight.net and a program of outreach, representing Irna Phillips' original message. There was also a special episode during January 2007, with current cast members playing Phillips and some of the earlier cast members. The series also introduced special beginning credits commemorating the anniversary. The show had a rotating slate of writers, including veteran GL writers Lucky Gold, Chris Dunn, and Jill Lorie Hurst, who was eventually named head writer.

Despite low ratings, the show won 2007 Daytime Emmy Awards for Best Writing and Best Show (sharing Best Show with The Young and the Restless).

==== Cancellation and final episode ====
On April 1, 2009, CBS announced that it would not renew Guiding Light, and the last broadcast date would be September 18, 2009. Because April 1 is also April Fools' Day, a day heavily associated with jokes and pranks, many people—even some of the cast and crew members—did not believe the news, thinking that it was another April Fools' Day prank. Procter & Gamble initially announced that they would attempt to find another outlet to distribute the series, but later admitted that they had been unsuccessful in doing so, and that on September 18, 2009, after 57 years on television (preceded by 15 years on radio for a total broadcast history of 72 years), Guiding Light would end its broadcast history on CBS.

Storylines were resolved in the final weeks of the series, and numerous characters from the series' past passed through Springfield one last time. Among the returnees were the characters of Nola, Holly and Mindy; Josh told Reva that he was leaving Springfield for a job for the next year, but proposes that he return one year from that date and, if by that time, she wants to reunite with him, she should meet him at the lighthouse and, if she is not there, he will assume she is not interested.

The final episode is pleasant, featuring many of the characters gathering in the park for a large picnic. Toward the end of the episode, it jumps forward one year, by which time, Phillip and Beth have reunited, as have Rick and Mindy. Olivia and Natalia, happy with their new baby, pick up Rafe as he returns from the army. The episode concludes with Josh arriving at the lighthouse, as promised, and finding Reva there. They declare their undying love. James, Ashlee, and Daisy leave Springfield and relocate to Santa Barbara, California. Josh asks if Reva is packed, to go on an adventure. The two grab the luggage, and with Reva's young son, they climb into Josh's pick-up truck. Josh says to Reva, "You ready?" She replies "always," a callback to her promise of "Always, Bud" that Reva uttered to Josh many times on the show. As the truck drives away with the lighthouse in the background, "The End" appears on the screen before a final fadeout. The song heard playing in the background during the final scene is "Together" by Michelle Branch.

The final episode also included the original tag line, with some revision, printed on the screen with the words "There is a destiny that makes us FAMILY" (replacing the word 'brothers'), as well as quick film clips of each of the show's title cards and announcers during the nearly six decades it was on television, leading to the show's former long-time beginning announcement: "And now, The Guiding Light".

== Production and locales ==
Guiding Light was broadcast from three locations: Chicago (where creator Irna Phillips resided), from 1937 until 1946; Hollywood, from 1947 until 1949; and New York City starting during 1949. It was relocated from Chicago to Hollywood (despite objections of both Phillips and Arthur Peterson) to take advantage of the talent pool. Production was subsequently relocated to New York City, where the majority of soap operas were produced during the 1950s, 1960s and much of the 1970s; it remained based in New York City until the show's conclusion. Its final taping location was the CBS studios in midtown Manhattan. From the 1970s to the 1990s it was filmed at the Chelsea Studios. From soon before February 29, 2008, outdoor scenes were filmed on location in Peapack, New Jersey. The location filming coincided with another significant production change, as the series became the first American weekday soap opera to be recorded digitally. The production team chose to film with Canon XH-G1 HDV camcorders in standard definition mode. Unlike the old production model with pedestal-style cameras and traditional three-sided sets, handheld cameras allowed producers to choose as many locations as they wished.

=== Final CBS seasons ===
During the daytime drama's 57th season on television and 72nd overall season, the series had changed its look to a more realistic experience in an attempt to compete with the growing popularity of reality television. The new look of Guiding Light included free-hand camera work and less action shown on traditional studio sets. Producer Ellen Wheeler introduced a "shaky-cam" style, present in a number of movies, featuring extreme-closeups and frequent cuts, including those that "broke the axis" (which proved disorienting to viewers accustomed to shows with the traditional "soap opera look"). Also new was the filming of outdoor scenes in actual outdoor settings. Even many indoor scenes had more of an "on location" feel, repurposing real locations, such as Guiding Light's production offices, to be motel rooms, nail salons, quick-mart and other businesses or locations. Thereby, the series had numerous sets without the cost of numerous separate locations. CBS and the show's producers had hoped that the new look would increase ratings, but the plan was ultimately unsuccessful.

On April 1, 2009, CBS canceled Guiding Light after 72 years, with the series finale on the network airing on September 18, 2009, making it the second-to-last Procter & Gamble soap opera to end.

=== Production summary ===
Production summary
| Start date | End date | Time slot (ET/CT) | Run time (minutes) | Network | Filming location | Notes |
|---|---|---|---|---|---|---|
| January 25, 1937 | October 13, 1939 | — | 15 | NBC Red Radio | Chicago | Canceled by Procter & Gamble, resulting in 75,000 protest letters. |
| January 22, 1940 | March 15, 1942 | — | 15 | NBC Blue Radio | Chicago | Sponsored by Procter & Gamble |
| March 16, 1942 | November 29, 1946 | — | 15 | NBC Red Radio | Chicago | Canceled by General Mills. |
| June 2, 1947 | September 23, 1949 | 12:45 pm / 11:45 am | 15 | CBS Radio | Hollywood | Sponsored by Procter & Gamble |
| September 26, 1949 | June 29, 1956 | 12:45 pm / 11:45 am | 15 | CBS | New York City | Sponsored by Procter & Gamble |
| July 2, 1956 | September 6, 1968 | 12:45 pm / 11:45 am | 15 | CBS Television | New York City | Sponsored by Procter & Gamble |
| September 9, 1968 | September 1, 1972 | 2:30 pm / 1:30 pm | 30 | CBS Television | New York City | — |
| September 4, 1972 | November 28, 1975 | 2:00 pm / 1:00 pm | 30 | CBS Television | New York City | — |
| December 1, 1975 | November 4, 1977 | 2:30 pm / 1:30 pm | 30 | CBS Television | New York City | — |
| November 7, 1977 | February 1, 1980 | 2:30 pm / 1:30 pm | 60 | CBS Television | New York City | — |
| February 4, 1980 | September 18, 2009 | 3:00 pm / 2:00 pm | 60 | CBS Television | New York City | As early as 1993, some affiliates began airing the show at 9:00 am, 10:00 am, or noon local time in favor of local programming airing at 3:00 pm on some CBS affiliates. |

The action has also been set in three different locales – it was based in the fictional towns of Five Points and Selby Flats before its final locale of Springfield.

== Broadcast history ==
Unlike most popular radio serials transitioning to television, The Guiding Light had no difficulty holding onto its old listening audience and simultaneously earning a new television fanbase. For at the time The Guiding Light made its television debut, neither ABC nor NBC had broadcast programs on their respective networks at 2:30 p.m. Eastern/1:30 Central, where CBS first placed The Guiding Light. However, six months into the run, the network moved the serial to a timeslot that gave it great popularity with its housewife audience: 12:45 p.m./11:45 a.m. It kept the new timeslot for the next 19 years and eight months, sharing the half-hour with its sister Procter & Gamble-packaged soap opera, Search for Tomorrow.

The Guiding Light handled the competition breezily, even against otherwise-legendary shows such as Queen for a Day on ABC (briefly in 1960) and NBC's Truth or Consequences. Usually, The Guiding Light ranked second in the Nielsen ratings behind another serial, As the World Turns. 1968, however, saw changing viewership trends that prompted CBS to expand its last two 15-minute daytime dramas, disrupting long-standing viewing habits. Search for Tomorrow took over the entire 12:30–1/11:30–Noon period, with The Guiding Light returning to its first timeslot, 2:30/1:30, albeit in the now-standard half-hour format, on September 9. This twin bill of expansions also caused the dislocation of The Secret Storm and the beloved Art Linkletter's House Party, as well as the cancellation of the daytime To Tell the Truth. It also put the serial in direct competition with NBC's The Doctors, which was beginning to peak in its popularity. Thus, the early 1970s saw the popularity of The Guiding Light dip somewhat.

After four years of airing at 2:30/1:30, CBS acceded to a demand made by The Guiding Light producer Procter & Gamble and moved its sibling series, The Edge of Night, to the earlier hour from its previous home at 3:30/2:30. Moving back one half hour, The Guiding Light stayed steadily on course against NBC's Days of Our Lives and ABC's The Newlywed Game. In late 1974, ABC replaced The Newlywed Game with The $10,000 Pyramid, which went on to garner strong ratings, but not greatly at The Guiding Light's expense. In 1975, the show officially dropped the word "The" from its title, although it was still referred to as The Guiding Light on air for several years after.

As the year progressed, CBS was looking to expand one of its daytime soap operas. All of its serials were now thirty minutes in length and had been since Guiding Light and Search For Tomorrow made the move in 1968. NBC had found ratings success with expanding Another World and Days of Our Lives to one hour earlier in 1975. CBS thought it too could find success, so the decision was made to expand As the World Turns, which was airing before Guiding Light at 1:30/12:30. Thus, in December, Guiding Light moved back to 2:30/1:30 in place of The Edge of Night, which switched networks and began airing on ABC. ABC had a short-lived hit the next year with an updated version of the game show Break the Bank. To complicate the picture further, ABC opted to make its first show expansions, those of One Life to Live and General Hospital, in July 1976; each of those shows occupied one-half of a 90-minute block until November 4, 1977.

With this in mind, ABC and CBS acted to give a contending chance to both General Hospital and Guiding Light by expanding them to an hour in length. CBS started first by expanding Guiding Light to an hour on November 7, 1977. This gained particular importance when ABC finally expanded both One Life to Live and General Hospital to an hour on January 16, 1978, so that Guiding Light straddled those two programs, as well as the first half of sister P&G show Another World on NBC. Despite that General Hospital surprising all observers by skyrocketing from near-cancellation to the top place in the ratings with the various storylines, Guiding Light held its own while in direct competition with General Hospital, still hit an upswing as the decade ended.

On February 4, 1980, CBS bumped Guiding Light down again, to 3 p.m./2c, and its sister P&G soap As The World Turns to 2 p.m./1c, in the midst of a major scheduling shuffle intended to give The Young and the Restless (itself now expanding to an hour length) a shot at beating ABC's All My Children. NBC did the same with its soap operas as well with all three networks now going head-head in every time slot. It remained in this time slot for the rest of its run, facing General Hospital and NBC entries such as Texas (a spin-off of Another World), The Match Game-Hollywood Squares Hour and Santa Barbara. None of these shows – not even General Hospital – had any significant impact on the ratings of Guiding Light at 3:00 p.m. during this period.

Overall, the first half of the 1980s saw a revival in Guiding Light's popularity, with a top-five placing achieved in most years and even a brief dethroning of then-powerhouse General Hospital from the #1 ratings spot for three consecutive weeks. However, as the decade progressed, the ratings slipped a bit, although it was still performing solidly. In 1995, beginning with CBS flagship station WCBS-TV in New York, Guiding Light began airing at 10 a.m. Eastern time in several markets. Its once-solid performance began to crumble by the mid-1990s, when its ratings sunk as low as ninth place out of ten. However, during the controversial clone storyline in 1998, the ratings experienced a brief resurgence, moving up to fifth for many weeks that summer. Nielsen reported Guiding Light had 5 million viewers in 1999.

Up until its CBS finale in 2009, stations in a number of markets aired Guiding Light in the morning either at 9 or 10 a.m. local time: Miami, Chicago, Baltimore, Boston, Detroit, New York City, Los Angeles, San Francisco, Philadelphia, Pittsburgh, Dallas-Fort Worth, Orlando, Atlanta, Columbia, SC, Fort Wayne, IN, South Bend, IN, Portland, OR, Quad Cities, Buffalo, Reno, Portland, ME, Milwaukee, Albany, NY, and Scranton-Wilkes Barre, PA. Guiding Light aired at 12 noon local time in Honolulu, Hawaii. In Savannah, GA, it aired at 4:00 pm local time.

Before 2004, stations that aired Guiding Light in the morning were always one episode behind those that aired the program at its official timeslot of 3:00 pm (ET). This changed in March 2004, during the first day of the NCAA March Madness basketball tournament, in which stations airing the show at 10:00 am were able catch up with stations that televised it at 3:00 pm. Starting in 2006, stations that televised Guiding Light at 9:00 am were also offered a same-day feed to catch up with the rest of the network. As a result of this, daily episodes for the remaining years of GL were the same on all stations regardless of timeslot.

Guiding Light maintained strong ratings in Pittsburgh, despite being moved to 10:00 am in 2006. According to a 2006 article in the Pittsburgh Post-Gazette, Dr. Phil had not been able to pull in the same numbers that Guiding Light did in that time slot a year prior, while Guiding Light was maintaining its audience share.

One CBS affiliate that did not air the show was KOVR-TV in Sacramento, California, which had become a CBS affiliate in 1995. Before CBS affiliated with KOVR, it had been affiliated in Sacramento with KXTV, which had dropped Guiding Light from its schedule in 1992 and did not air it again. As such, the show was preempted in the Sacramento area from 1992 to the show's cancellation. WNEM-TV in Flint/Saginaw/Bay City, Michigan, which also became a CBS affiliate that year, initially ran the soap before dropping it in 1996 because of disappointing ratings. In the fall of 2006, WNEM began running Guiding Light on its digital channel WNEM-DT2 (affiliated with MyNetwork TV and then-branded as "My 5") at 10 am, airing there for the remainder of its run.

On September 18, 2009, Guiding Light aired its final episode at 3:00 pm ET/2:00 pm CT on CBS. Reruns of The Price Is Right took over the Guiding Light time slot between September 21 and October 2, 2009, for two weeks. On October 5, 2009, CBS replaced Guiding Light with an hour-long revival of Let's Make a Deal, hosted by Wayne Brady.

=== Broadcast history in Canada ===
In Canada, Guiding Light was available to viewers directly through CBS-TV network affiliates from border cities or cable TV feeds until the show's ending in 2009. In addition, Guiding Light was also aired on several Canadian television networks through the 1980s up until its last air date.

Atlantic Satellite Network (ASN) – a supplementary service to its ATV system of CTV affiliates exclusively for Atlantic Canada – aired the soap simultaneously with the CBS feed from 1983 to 1984; then, the broadcast was moved to 12 noon until 1985.

The show also aired in French in Quebec. TVA, a Quebec privately owned French-language television network, rebroadcast episodes in French translation, twelve months behind, for a short period in 1984.

In the late 1980s into the early 1990s, the Canadian Broadcasting Corporation (CBC) briefly aired the P&G serial nationally at 3:00 p.m. in each specific local Canadian time zone. The CBC Television broadcast of Guiding Light was also on its schedule during the latter part of the 1960s during the serial 15-minute format. On both occasions, the daytime drama was only aired for a few seasons.

After a hiatus from Canadian television stations for many years, the series came back on CHCH-TV, exclusively for the Ontario market. In September 2007, Global picked up the show nationwide after CHCH-TV dropped it, claiming the Passions former time slot. Guiding Light returned to CHCH for the rest of its run when Global decided to air the 2008 TV series The Doctors.

== Awards ==
=== Daytime Emmy Awards ===
==== Show ====
- 1980 Outstanding Daytime Drama Series
- 1981 Outstanding Writing for a Daytime Drama Series
- 1982 Outstanding Daytime Drama Series
- 1982 Outstanding Writing for a Daytime Drama Series
- 1982 Outstanding Achievement in Any Area of Creative Technical Crafts (Technical Direction/Electronic Camerawork)
- 1983 Outstanding Achievement in Any Area of Creative Technical Crafts (Lighting Direction)
- 1984 Outstanding Achievement in Design Excellence for a Daytime Drama Series
- 1985 Outstanding Direction for a Drama Series
- 1985 Outstanding Achievement by a Drama Series Design Team – Ronald M. Kelson
- 1986 Outstanding Drama Series Writing Team
- 1986 Outstanding Achievement in Hairstyling for a Drama Series
- 1986 Outstanding Achievement in Costume Design for a Drama Series
- 1987 Outstanding Achievement in Makeup for a Drama Series
- 1987 Outstanding Achievement in Hairstyling for a Drama Series
- 1990 Outstanding Drama Series Writing Team
- 1991 Outstanding Original Song: "Love Like This"
- 1991 Outstanding Music Direction and Composition for a Drama Series
- 1992 Outstanding Original Song: "I Knew That I'd Fail"
- 1992 Outstanding Music Direction and Composition for a Drama Series
- 1992 Outstanding Achievement in Graphics and Title Design
- 1993 Outstanding Drama Series Writing Team
- 1993 Outstanding Achievement in Multiple Camera Editing for a Drama Series
- 1994 Outstanding Drama Series Directing Team
- 1994 Outstanding Music Direction and Composition for a Drama Series
- 1995 Outstanding Lighting Direction for a Drama Series
- 1995 Outstanding Achievement in Makeup for a Drama Series
- 1996 Outstanding Music Direction and Composition for a Drama Series
- 1996 Outstanding Achievement in Makeup for a Drama Series
- 1996 Outstanding Live and Direct-to-Tape Sound Mixing for a Drama Series
- 1996 Outstanding Lighting Direction for a Drama Series
- 1998 Outstanding Music Direction and Composition for a Drama Series
- 1998 Outstanding Lighting Direction for a Drama Series
- 1998 Outstanding Original Song: "Hold Me"
- 2007 Outstanding Writing Team for a Daytime Drama Series
- 2007 Outstanding Daytime Drama Series (tie, with The Young and the Restless)
- 2007 Outstanding Achievement in Music Direction and Composition for a Drama Series
- 2008 Outstanding Achievement in Music Direction and Composition for a Drama Series
- 2008 Outstanding Achievement in Live & Direct To Tape Sound Mixing for a Drama Series
- 2008 Outstanding Achievement in Multiple Camera Editing

==== Individuals ====
- 1983 Lifetime Achievement Award: Charita Bauer (Bert Bauer)
- 1984 Outstanding Supporting Actress in a Drama Series: Judi Evans Luciano (Beth Raines)
- 1985 Distinguished Service to Daytime Television: Charita Bauer (Bert Bauer) [posthumous]
- 1985 Outstanding Lead Actress in a Drama Series: Kim Zimmer (Reva Shayne)
- 1985 Outstanding Supporting Actor in a Drama Series: Larry Gates (H.B. Lewis)
- 1987 Outstanding Lead Actress in a Drama Series: Kim Zimmer (Reva Shayne)
- 1990 Outstanding Lead Actress in a Drama Series: Kim Zimmer (Reva Shayne)
- 1991 Outstanding Younger Actor in a Drama Series: Rick Hearst (Alan-Michael Spaulding)
- 1992 Outstanding Supporting Actress in a Drama Series: Maeve Kinkead (Vanessa Chamberlain)
- 1993 Outstanding Supporting Actress in a Drama Series: Ellen Parker (Maureen Bauer)
- 1993 Outstanding Younger Actor in a Drama Series: Monti Sharp (David Grant)
- 1994 Outstanding Lead Actor in a Drama Series: Michael Zaslow (Roger Thorpe)
- 1994 Outstanding Supporting Actor in a Drama Series: Justin Deas (Buzz Cooper)
- 1994 Outstanding Younger Actress in a Drama Series: Melissa Hayden (Bridget Reardon)
- 1995 Outstanding Lead Actor in a Drama Series: Justin Deas (Buzz Cooper)
- 1995 Outstanding Supporting Actor in a Drama Series: Jerry verDorn (Ross Marler)
- 1996 Outstanding Supporting Actor in a Drama Series: Jerry verDorn (Ross Marler)
- 1996 Outstanding Younger Actor in a Drama Series: Kevin Mambo (Marcus Williams)
- 1997 Outstanding Lead Actor in a Drama Series: Justin Deas (Buzz Cooper)
- 1997 Outstanding Younger Actor in a Drama Series: Kevin Mambo (Marcus Williams)
- 1998 Outstanding Lead Actress in a Drama Series: Cynthia Watros (Annie Dutton)
- 2002 Outstanding Supporting Actress in a Drama Series: Crystal Chappell (Olivia Spencer)
- 2003 Outstanding Younger Actor in a Drama Series: Jordi Vilasuso (Tony Santos)
- 2006 Outstanding Lead Actress in a Drama Series: Kim Zimmer (Reva Shayne)
- 2006 Outstanding Supporting Actor in a Drama Series: Jordan Clarke (Billy Lewis)
- 2006 Outstanding Supporting Actress in a Drama Series: Gina Tognoni (Dinah Marler)
- 2006 Outstanding Younger Actor in a Drama Series: Tom Pelphrey (Jonathan Randall)
- 2008 Outstanding Supporting Actress in a Drama Series: Gina Tognoni (Dinah Marler)
- 2008 Outstanding Younger Actor in a Drama Series: Tom Pelphrey (Jonathan Randall)
- 2009 Outstanding Supporting Actor in a Drama Series: Jeff Branson (Shayne Lewis)

=== Other awards ===
- Writers Guild of America Award (1980, 1992, 2005)
- Directors Guild of America Award (2005)

== Executive producers and head writers ==
=== Executive producers ===
Guiding Light executive producers
| Name(s) | Duration |
|---|---|
| Joe Ainley and Carl Waster | January 25, 1937– November 29, 1946 (Note: From 1937 to 1952, Guiding Light broadcast solely on radio. From 1952 to 1956, both radio and television broadcasts were simultaneously produced.) |
| Gordon Hughes | June 2, 1947– September 23, 1949 |
| David Lesan | September 26, 1949– May 14, 1954 |
| Lucy Ferri Rittenberg | May 17, 1954– June 22, 1970 |
| Peter Andrews | June 23, 1970– November 16, 1970 |
| Harry Eggart | November 17, 1970– January 31, 1973 |
| Lucy Ferri Rittenberg | Fzbruary 1, 1973– February 20, 1976 |
| Allen M. Potter | February 23, 1976– February 11, 1983 |
| Gail Kobe | February 14, 1983– May 16, 1986 |
| Joe Willmore | May 19, 1986– June 30, 1989 |
| Robert Calhoun | July 3, 1989– July 12, 1991 |
| Jill Farren Phelps | July 15, 1991 – May 26, 1995 |
| Michael Laibson | May 29, 1995– December 6, 1996 |
| Paul Rauch | December 9, 1996 – December 24, 2002 |
| John Conboy | December 26, 2002– March 15, 2004 |
| Ellen Wheeler | March 16, 2004– September 18, 2009 |

=== Head writers ===
Guiding Light head writers
| Name(s) | Duration |
|---|---|
| Irna Phillips | January 25, 1937– January 31, 1958 (Note: From 1952 to 1956, Phillips simultaneously wrote for both radio and television broadcasts of Guiding Light.) |
| Agnes Nixon | February 3, 1958 – January 7, 1966 |
| Agnes Nixon and John Boruff | January 10 – December 2, 1966 |
| Theodore and Mathilde Ferro | December 5, 1966 – December 22, 1967 |
| Irna Phillips | December 25, 1967 – May 24, 1968 |
| Gillian Houghton | May 27, 1968 – August 16, 1968 |
| Jane & Ira Avery | August 19, 1968 – January 28, 1969 |
| Robert Soderberg and Edith Sommer | January 29, 1969 – July 20, 1973 |
| James Gentile | July 23, 1973 – March 15, 1974 |
| Robert Cenedella | March 18, 1974 – January 3, 1975 |
| James Lipton | January 6- April 18, 1975 |
| Bridget and Jerome Dobson | April 21, 1975 – January 30, 1980 |
| Douglas Marland | January 31, 1980 – September 24, 1982 |
| Pat Falken Smith | September 27 – November 26, 1982 |
| L. Virginia Browne and Gene Palumbo | November 29, 1982 – March 18, 1983 |
| Carolyn Culliton, Richard Culliton and Gary Tomlin | March 21 – April 29, 1983 |
| Richard Culliton and Pamela Long Hammer | May 2 – November 18, 1983 |
| Pamela Long Hammer | November 21, 1983 – January 20, 1984 |
| Pamela Long Hammer and Jeff Ryder | January 23, 1984 – February 21, 1986 |
| Jeff Ryder | February 24 – May 1, 1986 |
| Mary Ryan Munisteri and Ellen Barrett | May 2– October 1, 1986 |
| Joseph D. Manetta | October 2-30, 1986 |
| Joseph D. Manetta and Sheri Anderson | October 31, 1986– September 9, 1987 |
| Pamela K. Long | September 10, 1987 - December 21, 1990 |
| Pamela K. Long and James E. Reilly | December 24, 1990 – January 11, 1991 |
| Nancy Curlee, Stephen Demorest and James E. Reilly | January 14, 1991 – January 14, 1992 |
| Lorraine Broderick, Nancy Curlee, Stephen Demorest and James E. Reilly (Note: From February to December 15, 1992, Curlee was on maternity leave.) | January 15 – December 11, 1992 |
| Lorraine Broderick, Nancy Curlee and Stephen Demorest | December 14, 1992 – July 5, 1993 |
| Nancy Curlee and Stephen Demorest | July 6, 1993 – February 24, 1994 |
| Nancy Curlee, Stephen Demorest and Patrick Mulcahey | February 25 – March 14, 1994 |
| Patrick Mulcahey | March 15 – 16, 1994 |
| Patrick Mulcahey and Nancy Williams Watt | March 17 – April 15, 1994 |
| Stephen Demorest, Patrick Mulcahey and Nancy Williams Watt | April 18 – June 3, 1994 |
| Stephen Demorest, Patrick Mulcahey, Nancy Williams Watt, Leah Laiman and Millee Taggart | June 6 – September 2, 1994 |
| Stephen Demorest, Nancy Williams Watt, Leah Laiman and Millee Taggart | September 6 – October 25, 1994 |
| Stephen Demorest and Millee Taggart | October 26 – November 28, 1994 |
| Stephen Demorest | November 29 – December 9, 1994 |
| Douglas Anderson | December 12, 1994 – April 14, 1995 |
| Douglas Anderson, Nancy Williams Watt and Peggy Sloane | April 17, 1995 - July 14, 1995 |
| Megan McTavish | July 17, 1995 – October 24, 1996 |
| Victor Miller, Michael Conforti and Nancy Williams Watt | October 25, 1996 – March 28, 1997 (Note: From 1996 to 1997, the credited head writers were interim-status.) |
| James Harmon Brown and Barbara Esensten | March 31, 1997 – August 4, 2000 |
| Claire Labine | August 7, 2000 – July 13, 2001 |
| Lloyd Gold | July 16 – September 10, 2001 |
| Lloyd Gold and Christopher Dunn (co-head writer) | September 17, 2001 – November 15, 2002 |
| Millee Taggart and Carolyn Culliton (co-head writer) | November 18, 2002 – September 12, 2003 |
| Ellen Weston and Donna M. Swajeski (co-head writer) | September 15, 2003 – July 5, 2004 |
| David Kreizman and Donna M. Swajeski (co-head writer) | July 6, 2004 – August 21, 2008 (Note: In 2008, for one month's duration: March to April, no head writer was credited, due to the 2007–08 Writers Guild of America strike.) |
| Christopher Dunn, Lloyd Gold, Jill Lorie Hurst and David Kreizman | August 22, 2008 – September 18, 2009 |

== Home media ==
On January 19, 2012, SoapClassics released a four-disc DVD collection of 20 selected episodes. The oldest episode on the collection dates from April 1, 1980, while the latest episode is from September 14, 2009, during the show's final broadcast week.

The company has since released special collections celebrating Reva Shayne and Phillip Spaulding.

On May 23, 2012, SoapClassics released the final ten Guiding Light episodes on a two-disc DVD set.

Also beginning in June 2012, the series was released on DVD in Germany beginning with the episodes from 1979.
