= The Case of: JonBenét Ramsey =

2016 TV documentary miniseries

- Genre: Documentary
- Country of origin: United States
- Original language: English
- No. of episodes: 2

Production
- Running time: 120 minutes

Original release
- Network: CBS
- Release: September 18 – September 19, 2016

The Case of: JonBenét Ramsey is a 2016 documentary miniseries about the murder of JonBenét Ramsey in Boulder, Colorado on December 25, 1996. The miniseries aired on CBS on September 18, and 19, 2016.

== Investigative team ==
The investigative team said they reviewed the case, including the 911 call, ransom note, and other aspects of the case in re-created rooms of the Ramsey house. The documentary mixed past investigative footage with re-enactments of what they believe happened, along with that of this investigative team, which included former FBI agent Jim Clemente, forensic scientist Dr. Henry Lee, former Boulder Police Department officer and Telluride Marshal's Department Chief Marshal Albert James Kolar, forensic pathologist Dr. Werner Spitz, former FBI agent James R. Fitzgerald, former Scotland Yard criminal behavior analyst Laura Richards, and former FBI agent Stan Burke.

In his lawsuit against CBS, Burke Ramsey's lawyers said that the CBS documentary contained no new investigation, but was a rehash of a 2012 book on the case by one of the participating investigators, Jim Kolar.

== DNA evidence ==
The team examined the theory about an outsider depositing DNA on JonBenet's underwear and concluded that this trace amount of evidence could have been transferred when the underwear were made and packaged. (Note: In 2008, the Ramseys had been exonerated when it was determined that the DNA found on JonBenet's underwear did not belong to a family member.)

Former FBI profiler Candice Delong has stated "This is a DNA case." In an interview sampled on the Dr. Phil show she laughingly dismissed the idea that the same touch DNA could have shown up on multiple items of JonBenét's clothing stemming from the same factory worker in China.

== The 911 call ==
The team used modern equipment and an interview with the 911 dispatcher, Kimberly Archuleta, to examine the 911 call and claimed that there were three voices on the tape: Patsy, John and Burke. They believed one of the three voices was a boy. At the end of the call, the 911 dispatcher heard Patsy say "OK, we've called the police, now what?" By slowing down the last six seconds of the recording of the call, they heard three people talking. Patsy was deemed to have said "What did you do?" and "Help me, Jesus." John saying "We're not speaking to you." A child, likely Burke, saying "What did you find?"

Twenty years before, the Secret Service and the FBI had listened to the same tape and heard nothing to indicate that Burke's voice could be heard. In 2003, NBC had also sent out the recording to their own experts, who agreed that nothing of substance could be made out in the seconds after Patsy finished talking.

The wording used during the call was concerning to the team: During the call Patsy did not mention the name of her daughter. Also, she said "I'm the mother" and "we have a kidnapping".

== Ransom note ==
Text of the ransom note

Mr. Ramsey,

Listen carefully! We are a group of individuals that represent a small foreign faction. We ~~do~~ respect your bussiness [sic] but not the country that it serves. At this time we have your daughter in our posession [sic] She is safe and unharmed and if you want her to see 1997, you must follow our instructions to the letter.

You will withdraw $118,000.00 from your account. $100,000 will be in $100 bills and the remaining $18,000 in $20 bills. Make sure that you bring an adequate size attache to the bank. When you get home you will put the money in a brown paper bag. I will call you between 8 and 10 am tomorrow to instruct you on delivery. The delivery will be exhausting so I advise you to be rested. If we monitor you getting the money early, we might call you early to arrange an earlier delivery of the money and hence a [sic] earlier ~~delivery~~ pick-up of your daughter.

Any deviation of my instructions will result in the immediate execution of your daughter. You will also be denied her remains for proper burial. The two gentlemen watching over your daughter do ^{not} particularly like you so I advise you not to provoke them. Speaking to anyone about your situation, such as Police, F.B.I., etc., will result in your daughter being beheaded. If we catch you talking to a stray dog, she dies. If you alert bank authorities, she dies. If the money is in any way marked or tampered with, she dies. You will be scanned for electronic devices and if any are found, she dies. You can try to deceive us but be warned that we are familiar with law enforcement countermeasures and tactics. You stand a 99% chance of killing your daughter if you try to out smart [sic] us. Follow our instructions and you stand a 100% chance of getting her back.

You and your family are under constant scrutiny as well as the authorities. Don't try to grow a brain John. You are not the only fat cat around so don't think that killing will be difficult. Don't underestimate us John. Use that good southern common sense of yours. It is up to you now John!

Victory!

S.B.T.C

— Original text

According to E! News, "One of the strangest parts of the Ramsey case has always been the ransom note, which [...] made no sense given the fact that JonBenét's body was found in the house a few hours later". Fitzgerald believed that misspellings and other mistakes were intentional, to make it appear that English was not the writer's native language.

The note demanded $118,000, the rounded amount of John Ramsey's bonus after taxes the previous year. It took the experts 21 minutes or more just to copy the ransom note. The pen and paper appeared to have been put back where they belonged after the note was written. Many lines from the letter were taken from Speed, Dirty Harry and other films.

Fitzgerald said that the note appeared to be written by a "maternal" person. A US Federal Court had ruled that Patsy had almost certainly not written the note, and that "abundant evidence" demonstrated the innocence of all the Ramseys.

The letters ‘S.B.T.C’ have also been a mystery. There have been many guesses about what the letters could stand for, but none have been confirmed.

== Cause of death theory ==
JonBenét was determined by police to have "suffered a blow to the head and had also been strangled with a garrote."

The investigators concluded that JonBenét could have been killed, perhaps accidentally, by a blow from a flashlight by a 10-year-old boy, based upon experiments performed using a child and fake skulls with wigs. They were also able to recreate the injury that JonBenét sustained to her head by having the boy in the experiment use a flashlight, similar to one found in the kitchen of the Ramsey's home.

== The Ramseys ==
John, Patsy and Burke have denied involvement in the death of JonBenét. No charges have been filed in the case, as of September 2016. (Note: In 1999, a Colorado grand jury called for the indictment of John and Patsy Ramsey regarding the death of their daughter, but Alex Hunter, the district attorney, had decided not to indict them. The indictment cited "two counts each of child abuse" and "did unlawfully, knowingly, recklessly and feloniously permit a child to be unreasonably placed in a situation which posed a threat of injury to the child's life or health, which resulted in the death of JonBenét Ramsey, a child under the age of sixteen." In 2002, the statute of limitations on the charges expired.) Several days prior to the airing of this mini-series, Burke Ramsey was interviewed on the Dr. Phil show in a three-episode series about the death of his sister. It was his first public interview. (Note: During the interview, he told Dr. Phil that he did not kill JonBenet and thought she was likely murdered by a pedophile who had followed her in beauty pageants.) The Ramsey family lawyer, L. Lin Wood, threatened to sue CBS for libel (defamation) based on its conclusion that JonBenét was killed by Burke. In time lawsuits were filed on behalf of Burke Ramsey and John Ramsey against CBS, as well as against various participants in the program, seeking close to $1 billion in total. Attempts at having the suit dismissed were unsuccessful. Eventually, all the defamation lawsuits related to the show were retired outside of court in a confidential settlement.

== Critical review ==
The review of the mini-series by Variety questioned the objectivity of the team, particularly in taking "hazy" assertions and declaring them as fact. For example, during the show it is stated that John Ramsey called out that he had found JonBenet before he turned on the light to the dark basement room where the body lay, but the source or veracity of the statement was not clear. Rolling Stone magazine found that there were three ways in which the investigation was flawed: 1) "Confirmation bias, selective hearing and the misleading 911 call analysis", 2) "Dismissing the DNA evidence entirely" and 3) "Overselling linguistic forensics and behavioral analysis as conclusive". They found that since the investigation did not unearth any new evidence, the conclusions were not new but subjective, and based upon the initial "flawed" police investigation.

E! News, on the other hand, offered three "bombshells" from the series regarding: 1) The 911 call, 2) The Ransom Note, and 3) Cause of Death.

Bob Grant, former Adams County District Attorney who was brought in to advise the Boulder District Attorney office on the case, voiced skepticism about any of the 2016 television show's abilities to unearth a new theory or solidify an existing theory in the case. He said, "The case will always be, in my mind, one where there are two likely scenarios. And to prove one, you have to disprove the other." He states that without a viable confession, it is unlikely that there will be resolution in the case.

CNN commentator John Philips called the show "shameful", and suggested that CBS should earn a "Fake News Award" for passing on information he termed "reckless".

Attorney Dan Abrams, who is a legal commentator for ABC, called the allegation that Burke killed his sister "total BS".

== See also ==
- Getting Away with Murder: The JonBenet Ramsey Story
