= Butters' Very Own Episode =

- South Park episode
- Episode no.: Season 5 Episode 14
- Directed by: Eric Stough
- Written by: Trey Parker
- Production code: 514
- Original air date: December 12, 2001

Episode chronology
← Previous "Kenny Dies"	Next → "Jared Has Aides"
- South Park season 5

"Butters' Very Own Episode" is the fourteenth and final episode of the fifth season of the animated television series South Park, and the 79th episode of the series overall. "Butters' Very Own Episode" originally aired in the United States on Comedy Central on December 12, 2001. In the episode, Butters Stotch survives a murder attempt by his own mother after discovering his father's homosexual dalliances and must travel back to South Park in time for his parents' wedding anniversary at Bennigan's. Meanwhile, Butters' parents join John and Patsy Ramsey, Gary Condit, and O. J. Simpson in lying to the press about who murdered Butters.

The episode was written by series co-creator Trey Parker and directed by animation director Eric Stough on his last solo directorial work for the series. It is the first episode to center solely on Butters and is a parody of 1950s sitcoms.

== Plot ==
Butters Stotch expresses excitement about his parents' upcoming anniversary, which they are going to celebrate at Butters' favorite restaurant, Bennigan's. A few days before their anniversary, his mother, Linda, asks Butters to spy on his father, Chris, in order to find out what his gift for her will be so that her own will not fall short. While spying, Butters watches Chris enter first an adult theater for gay men (to watch "Fisting Firemen 9") and then a gay bathhouse, but Butters is too naive to understand the nature of his father's activity. Upon returning home, Butters reports to his mother about his father's whereabouts, leaving her appalled by the news of her husband's proclivities, becoming visibly distraught and unhinged. Butters later catches Chris at the club, who tries to explain it to him. Linda then attempts to murder Butters by dumping her car in a river with him inside while Chris was in shock that he already told her.

Hours later, Chris enters the home to find his wife attempting to hang herself. He rushes to her side and explains that his homoerotic tendencies stem from chatting with other bi-curious and married men on the Internet. He insists he still loves her and does not want to lose his family over his "addiction". Linda then admits to having drowned Butters, to which Chris promises that he will not let her go to jail. The next day, the Stotches confront the press about their son, stating that he was abducted by "some Puerto Rican guy". As the media centers in on the "missing child" case, the pair are inducted into a club of infamous, highly publicized characters whose loved ones have also been "taken from them by Some Puerto Rican Guy", including Gary Condit, O. J. Simpson, and John and Patricia Ramsey.

Butters, however, survives his mother's attempt to kill him in similar fashion to the infamous Susan Smith murder of her children, and brushes off the incident as an accident. He then sets off home, eager to get back in time to celebrate his parents' anniversary with them. He first does some singing and dancing at a seedy 'dance' club, and then heads down a scary road after getting directions from an Old Mechanic. He returns home to find his parents fighting over all the lies they have told. Upon hearing what the quarrel was about, he snaps and then scolds them for lying and trying to teach him to lie.

Deciding to follow in their son's footsteps, they come clean to the media about the cover-up, revealing many unsettling facts to Butters in the process. Afterwards, Stan Marsh, Kyle Broflovski and Eric Cartman mock Butters about his unhinged parents. Although he attempts to make light of the situation, Butters admits that he is now probably scarred for life, the boys are going to ridicule him, and sometimes lying really can be for the best.

== Production ==
Written by series co-creator Trey Parker and directed by animation director Eric Stough, "Butters' Very Own Episode" was rated TV-MA in the United States, and originally aired on December 12, 2001, on Comedy Central. In the DVD commentary, Parker and Stone indicate they planned to make Butters the fourth group member after Kenny was written off the show, and created this episode as a prelude to his assuming a more prominent role in the series.

== Reception ==
IGN gave "Butters' Very Own Episode" a positive rating of 8.5, stating, "There are several classic moments in this episode, but it all works so well because of the setup."

== Legacy ==
At the time of the episode, suspicion hung over Gary Condit regarding the disappearance of Chandra Levy, and the Ramseys regarding the murder of their daughter JonBenét. However, someone else was later convicted for the murder of Chandra Levy and Condit was thought to be exonerated. Subsequently, prosecutors dropped all charges on July 28, 2016, after an associate of the sole witness came forward with secret recordings in which the witness admitted to falsifying testimony about the murder of Chandra Levy. The murder of Chandra Levy therefore remains unsolved. The district attorney in the Ramsey case declined an indictment of the parents in JonBenét's death. In a 2011 interview, South Park creators Trey Parker and Matt Stone stated that they regretted how Condit and the Ramseys were portrayed in the episode.

== Home media ==
"Butters' Very Own Episode", along with the fourteen other episodes from South Park: the Complete Fifth Season, were released on a three-disc DVD set in the United States on February 22, 2005. The set includes brief audio commentaries by Parker and Stone for each episode. The episode was also released on the two-disc DVD collection A Little Box of Butters.

== See also ==
- South Park (Park County, Colorado)
- South Park City
