= Perfect Murder, Perfect Town =

2000 television miniseries directed by Lawrence Schiller

- Home media cover
- Based on: Perfect Murder, Perfect Town by Lawrence Schiller
- Teleplay by: Tom Topor
- Directed by: Lawrence Schiller
- Starring: Kris Kristofferson; Marg Helgenberger; Ronny Cox; Dyanne Iandoli; Tyler Sharp; Scott Cohen; Ken Howard; John Heard; Peter Friedman; John Rubinstein; Jane Powell; Dennis Boutsikaris; Ann-Margret
- Music by: John Cacavas
- Country of origin: United States
- Original language: English

Production
- Producer: Jack L. Warner
- Cinematography: Peter Sova
- Editors: Freeman A. Davies; Tom Rolf
- Running time: 178 minutes

Original release
- Network: CBS
- Release: February 27 – March 1, 2000

Perfect Murder, Perfect Town is a 2000 American television miniseries directed by Lawrence Schiller. The teleplay by Tom Topor is based on Schiller's book of the same title.

Including historic news and talk show footage, it covers in great detail what was considered a botched investigation into the murder of six-year-old JonBenét Ramsey, whose body was found in the basement of her Boulder, Colorado home on December 26, 1996. The police and district attorney openly feuded about how the case should be investigated. Their focus on the girl's parents drew intense worldwide media attention that ultimately made the adults appear guilty to the public. It was revealed in 2013 that a grand jury was willing to indict John and Patsy Ramsey with child abuse resulting in death and accessory to first-degree murder. The prosecutor decided against prosecution due to the unlikelihood of a conviction.

The miniseries originally was broadcast by CBS.

== Principal Cast ==
The case includes:

- Kris Kristofferson as Lou Smit
- Marg Helgenberger as Patsy Ramsey
- Ronny Cox as John Ramsey
- Dyanne Iandoli as JonBenét Ramsey
- Tyler Sharp as Burke Ramsey
- Scott Cohen as Steve Thomas
- Ken Howard as Alex Hunter
- John Heard as Larry Mason
- Peter Friedman as Peter Hofstrom
- John Rubinstein as Reverend Hoverstock
- Jane Powell as Dance Instructor
- Dennis Boutsikaris as Chief Koby
- Ann-Margret as Nedra Paugh

== Principal production credits ==
- Executive producers – Lawrence Schiller, Richard Waltzer
- Original music – John Cacavas
- Cinematography – Peter Sova
- Production design – Steven Legler
- Art direction – Kevin Egeland
- Set decoration – Eric Weiler
- Costume design – Marilyn Matthews

== Critical reception ==
In his review in Variety, Michael Speier said, "While Perfect Murder, Perfect Town isn't the most intellectual project on CBS' docket, it's certainly not the car wreck a lot of people are expecting. Patient and extremely detailed, this look at the Boulder, Colo., tabloid magnet gets high marks for steering clear of sweeps sensationalism ... There are some weak links, especially when it comes to Patsy's behavior. Helgenberger is a good sport, doing her best to get inside the mind of a flighty woman, but her portrayal often comes off as cartoonish and far-fetched. More on the mark is Cox, who creates an aloof millionaire who can't cope with a sudden loss of control ... Credit Schiller, however, for somehow making everybody credible and for crafting a search that leaves no stone unturned. Archival footage of real-life talkshows and local news footage is a nifty addition to an overall solid production."

The Entertainment Weekly critic observed, "The telefilm ... is mostly a tedious slog through the legal details interrupted periodically by noxious images ... Cox and Helgenberger are called upon to do so much weeping and wailing during the first half hour that you wonder if they'll make it through the full four. Cox's John remains a cipher, but Helgenberger manages to convey much of the melodramatic emotionalism that Patsy has frequently displayed without giving a melodramatic performance herself — that's an achievement, even in a big piece of schlock like Perfect Murder ... Taking into account acting performances, script, and direction, Perfect Murder, Perfect Town averages out to a C; combine it with the F-grade moral scruples it took to embark on this exploitive abomination in the first place, however, and you get an all-too-generous D."

Caryn James of The New York Times called the film "leaden" and "competently made but dull", but praised Marg Helgenberger and Scott Cohen. She said they "rose above the script" while calling Ronny Cox bland and Kris Kristofferson drab.

== See also ==
- Getting Away with Murder: The JonBenet Ramsey Story
- The Case of: JonBenét Ramsey
- My Sister, My Love
