= Cold Case: Who Killed JonBenét Ramsey =

American documentary series

- Genre: Documentary
- Directed by: Joe Berlinger
- Country of origin: United States
- Original language: English
- No. of episodes: 3

Production
- Executive producers: Joe Berlinger; Craig D'Entrone; Jon Kamen; Jen Isaacson
- Running time: 58-62 minutes
- Production companies: RadicalMedia; Third Eye Motion Picture Company

Original release
- Network: Netflix
- Release: November 25, 2024

Cold Case: Who Killed JonBenét Ramsey is an American documentary series directed and produced by Joe Berlinger. It explores the killing of JonBenét Ramsey, reexamining the case, missteps made by the media and law enforcement.

It premiered November 25, 2024, on Netflix.

== Premise ==
The documentary series reexamines the killing of JonBenét Ramsey, investigating missteps made by law enforcement and the media. The series also highlights measures that could potentially solve the case. Key people involved are interviewed in the series, including John Bennett Ramsey.

== Episodes ==
| No. | Title | Directed by | Original release date |
|---|---|---|---|
| 1 | "Keep Your Babies Close" | Joe Berlinger | November 25, 2024 |
| 2 | "Umbrella of Suspicion" | Joe Berlinger | November 25, 2024 |
| 3 | "The Truth Is Going to Prevail" | Joe Berlinger | November 25, 2024 |

== Production ==
John Ramsey, who appears in the series, was not paid and had no editorial input.

In October 2024, it was announced Joe Berlinger had directed and executive produced a documentary series revolving around the Killing of JonBenét Ramsey, with RadicalMedia set to produce, and Netflix to distribute.
