= St. James Episcopal Cemetery =

Cemetery in Cobb County, Georgia, US

St. James' Episcopal Cemetery Marietta, Georgia
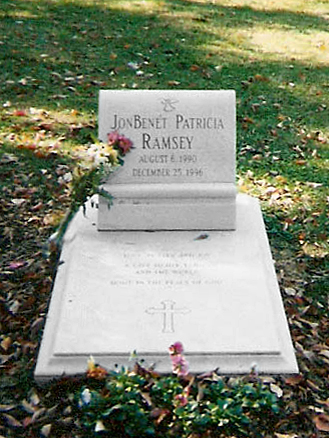
- JonBenét Ramsey’s grave at Saint James Episcopal Cemetery in Marietta, Georgia
- Interactive map of St. James' Episcopal Cemetery Marietta, Georgia

Details
- Established: 1849
- Location: Marietta, Georgia
- Country: United States
- Coordinates: 33°57′17″N 84°33′22″W
- Type: Private
- Find a Grave: St. James' Episcopal Cemetery Marietta, Georgia

St. James' Episcopal Church Cemetery was founded in 1849, as a parish burial ground that was laid out on the furthest corner of the 20-acre St. James' Episcopal Church property, at the corner of Winn Street and what is now Polk Street in Marietta, Georgia. However, much of the space between the cemetery and St. James' is now owned by First United Methodist Church.

The cemetery is completely surrounded by an iron fence. It can be accessed through a gate on Polk Street. The cemetery is open daily, except for major holidays and severe weather events.

Some of the most famous families in Cobb County are represented in this cemetery including the Glovers (John Glover was the first mayor of Marietta and his wife would donate the land for the Confederate Cemetery), Lawrences, Sessions', Whitlocks, Hunts, Schillings, Northcutts, and many other first families. A columbarium and the "Garden of Peace" are located in the southeast corner of the cemetery. The cemetery was originally mapped in 1955, but the map was revised in 2013.

It is rumored that during the Civil War, slaves were buried in the southwest corner of the cemetery in unmarked graves. However, no evidence proving this has ever been found. Most of the southwest corner of the cemetery is currently taken up by marked graves from the 1960s and 1970s.

In 1996, child murder-victim JonBenét Ramsey was interred in Saint James Episcopal Cemetery in Marietta, next to her half-sister Elizabeth Pasch Ramsey (daughter of John Bennett Ramsey and his first wife), who died in a 1992 car accident at the age of 22. JonBenet's mother, Patsy Ramsey, was buried next to her upon her death in 2006.

== Governing ==
The St. James' Cemetery Board, operating at St. James' Episcopal Church, governs the cemetery.
