= Lou Smit =

American police detective

Lou Smith
- Born: Andrew Louis Smit; April 14, 1935; Colorado Springs, Colorado, United States
- Died: August 11, 2010 (aged 75); Pikes Peak Hospice, Colorado Springs, Colorado, United States
- Occupation: Police detective

Andrew Louis "Lou" Smit (April 14, 1935 – August 11, 2010) was an American police detective in Colorado Springs, Colorado who worked on a number of notable cases before his retirement in 1996. He was later recalled to work on the murder of JonBenét Ramsey.

== Life and career ==
Smit having tried various businesses and failed, prayed for a solution and saw as an answer from God a call he received from a cousin who served on the Colorado Springs Police Department suggesting that he apply to serve. Smit fell just short of the department's minimum height of five feet and nine inches, but was able to join the force in 1966 after he had his cousin hit him over the skull with a nightstick, allowing him to meet the height minimum when he was remeasured the following day with the bump on his head. Working his way up to the rank of detective, Smit was involved in a number of notable cases including the conviction of spree killer Freddie Glenn for a series of murders, including the 1975 killing of Karen Grammer, younger sister of actor Kelsey Grammer. In 1995, he arrested Robert Charles Browne for the 1991 murder of Heather Dawn Church. Church's father had been one of the original suspects in his daughter's murder, but Browne ultimately confessed to a total of 48 murders and was sentenced to life imprisonment. Smit retired in 1996 from the El Paso County, Colorado Sheriff's department where he had served as captain of detectives. Some of Smit's cases, such as the Grammer and Church murders, were featured on the Investigation Discovery series Homicide Hunter.

In 1997, three months after the murder of JonBenét Ramsey, Smit was asked by the district attorney's office to come out of retirement to assist with the investigation. While initial suspicions had been that Patsy Ramsey was responsible for the murder and that John Ramsey had been protecting his wife, Smit resigned from the case after 18 months having concluded that the Ramseys were not responsible for the murder and that the Boulder Police Department had been unjustifiably pursuing the Ramseys as suspects despite DNA and other evidence that showed that some other person was responsible for the killing. In his September 1998 resignation letter, Smit stated that "the Ramseys did not do it" and cited "substantial, credible evidence of an intruder and a lack of evidence that the parents are involved". Smit later worked for the Ramseys in helping establish their innocence.

After the Ramsey case, Smit continued to work on cold cases. As a detective, Smit boasted that he "never lost a homicide case" in a career in which he worked on more than 200 murder cases in which a suspect had been arrested and tried for their crime.

Smit went to a doctor in April 2010 after experiencing abdominal pain. After a CAT scan identified a tumor as the cause of the pain, surgeons discovered that the cancer had spread throughout his body and was untreatable. Smit died at age 75 on August 11, 2010, at the Pikes Peak Hospice in Colorado Springs due to colon cancer. John Ramsey came to pray at his bedside shortly before Smit's death. Smit was survived by three daughters, a son and nine grandchildren.

== Portrayals ==
Smit has been portrayed by Kris Kristofferson in the CBS television miniseries Perfect Murder, Perfect Town (2000); Hrothgar Mathews in Lifetime's Who Killed Jonbenet (2016) and Will Patton in the Netflix miniseries The Murder of JonBenét Ramsey (2026).
