= Murder of Brianna Denison =

Murder of American student

Brianna Denison
- Born: Brianna Zunino Denison; March 29, 1988
- Died: January 20, 2008 (aged 19); Reno, Nevada, U.S.
- Education: Santa Barbara City College

Brianna Zunino Denison (March 29, 1988 – January 20, 2008) was an American college student who was abducted on January 20, 2008, from a friend's house in Reno, Nevada. Her body was discovered on February 15, 2008, in a field near a Reno business park after being raped and murdered. A man named James Michael Biela was convicted of the murder and sentenced to death.

== Background ==
Brianna Denison attended Reno High School in Reno, Nevada, graduating in June 2006. Denison was at home during winter break from Santa Barbara City College, where she was studying psychology. She and her friends had attended events tied to a Summer Winter Action Tours LLC (a travel agency that caters to students), Martin Luther King Jr. weekend in Reno; Denison had reportedly attended this event in the past. She was last seen alive on January 20, 2008, at about 4 am Pacific Time at her friend's house near the University of Nevada campus. This residence is on Mackay Court in Reno, where she was staying after attending a party at the Sands Regency on North Arlington Avenue. Her friend woke up at around 9:00 am and could not find Denison. A small bloodstain was found on the pillow Denison used that night, which led her friend to alert Denison's parents and local authorities. Denison had left the house without her shoes, cell phone, or purse. Authorities believed she was wearing only sweats and a white tank top. Her body was later found dressed only in bright orange-colored socks.

In the following days, the Reno Police Department conducted a forensic investigation of the MacKay Court residence where Denison was staying when she was abducted and found touch DNA belonging to an unidentified male on the doorknob. They also discovered that blood on the pillow was Denison's. Investigators began focusing on a kidnapping scenario.

=== Search ===
On January 21, 2008, detectives began sweeping the University of Nevada, Reno area in search of Denison. The Federal Bureau of Investigation (FBI) also joined in the search efforts. Investigators later learned that the male DNA found on the couch where Denison was sleeping the night when she disappeared was linked with at least two previous sexually motivated attacks in the same area, one on November 13, 2007, and the second on December 16, 2007.

On January 29, 2008, a Reno woman claimed she knew another victim who said she was raped at gunpoint in a parking garage on the University of Nevada, Reno campus in October 2007 but had not reported the crime. Police began interviewing nearly 100 registered sex offenders who live within a mile of the MacKay Court home.

Around 1,700 volunteers helped with the search of a 100-square-mile (260 km^{2}) area during the time Denison was missing, including Nevada's then-First Lady Dawn Gibbons (wife of then-Governor Jim Gibbons).

On February 15, 2008, Albert Jimenez was returning from his lunch break at a Subway restaurant. As he was walking by the road, he noticed bright orange-colored fabric standing out among a pile of discarded tree limbs lying in a ditch. When he got closer, he discovered the neon orange was socks, attached to feet. What at first he thought was a mannequin turned out to be a deceased woman. Jimenez had heard about Brianna Denison's kidnapping but didn't think that the victim resembled the photographs which he had seen on billboards. Jimenez didn't have a cell phone, so he quickly returned to his place of employment, EE Technologies, to call the Reno police. When police arrived to the South Reno lot, Jimenez was told that the victim was Denison. On February 16, 2008, an autopsy report confirmed that the body found in a field near a Reno business park was Brianna Denison.

== Perpetrator ==
James Michael Biela

On January 29, 2008, Reno police released a description of the unknown perpetrator. The person in question was also linked to at least two attempted sexual assaults in November and December 2007, and the woman who claimed to have been raped in a parking garage in October. Previous victims also gave enough detailed information for police to sketch the suspect. An item of underwear was found near Denison's body along with the DNA of the perpetrator and the DNA of an unknown female. Police said that the clothing item did not belong to Denison and that it might have been left near her body to taunt the investigators. Police asked that anyone who recognized the clothing item as theirs come forward as they might know the identity of the perpetrator.

=== Arrest ===
On Tuesday, November 12, 2008, James Michael Biela, 27, of Sparks, Nevada, was arrested and booked at the Washoe County Jail on charges of murder, first-degree kidnapping, and sexual assault. The arrest occurred while he was dropping his son off at the Stepping Stones Children's Center in Reno. A DNA sample was collected from Biela. He had previously been arrested in 2001 for threatening his former girlfriend's neighbor with a knife.

In a press conference held by the Reno Police Department on Wednesday, November 26, 2008, it was confirmed that the DNA collected from Biela matched the DNA found at the crime scene, positively linking him to the murder of Brianna Denison and a previous sexual assault.

At this same press conference, it was also stated that a friend of his girlfriend had turned in Biela via the Secret Witness program on November 1, 2008. Biela's girlfriend had confided to this friend that she had found underwear unknown to her in Biela's truck as they were returning from Washington state, where Biela had taken a job in March. Widespread news media reports began circulating, including a police sketch of a suspect and a description of a vehicle used in another rape the month before Brianna's abduction.

According to Reno Police Department Chief Michael Poehlman, detectives questioned Biela after the Secret Witness tip came in. He denied involvement, and declined to provide a DNA sample. Biela's girlfriend was also questioned, and gave police permission to obtain DNA from her 4-year-old son, whom Biela had fathered. The test indicated that the child's direct relative had left DNA at the home where Brianna Denison was abducted and at the other rape that had taken place the prior month. With this evidence, Reno police obtained both an arrest warrant and a warrant for Biela's DNA.

Chief Poehlman announced at a press conference that the Washoe County Sheriff's Department crime lab had tested Biela's DNA and found it matched DNA from the Denison case and another rape. Washoe County District Attorney Dick Gammick told reporters at the news conference he would be prosecuting the case with one of his lead criminal deputies, Elliot Sattler, and that his office would be seeking the "maximum penalty" for Biela, up to and including the death penalty.

It was also announced that, on his way to Washington, Biela had sold his truck, which matched the description of the vehicle used in the previous sexual assault. At the press conference, officials said the vehicle was being returned to Reno to be searched and used as evidence in the case against him.

=== Trial and sentencing ===
On Thursday, May 27, 2010, Biela was found guilty of the murder of Brianna Denison. After deliberating for about nine hours, the jury returned a guilty verdict for all counts against Biela, which included kidnapping, sexual assault, and murder. Defense attorneys argued against the death penalty, stating that Biela suffered an abusive childhood due to an alcoholic father, that he had been a productive member of society before his crimes, and that he was a model prisoner. Jurors did not accept these mitigating factors and handed down the death sentence. On July 30, 2010, Judge Robert Perry sentenced Biela to four additional life sentences for multiple counts of rape and kidnapping associated with attacks on two victims before Denison's abduction and murder. Biela has appealed to the Nevada Supreme Court to reverse the denial of his 2012 writ of habeas corpus by the Washoe County second judicial district court. His appeal was most recently denied on June 12, 2019, whereby the Nevada Supreme Court "considered Biela's arguments and concluded that they do not warrant relief, we ORDER the judgment of the district court AFFIRMED."

== Aftermath ==
The sale of handguns, stunguns and pepper spray increased dramatically in the University of Nevada, Reno area after Denison's body was found.

On February 23, 2008, hundreds of people attended a vigil held in Reno for Denison.

=== Media attention ===
The case received prominent national media attention, including coverage by national news services Fox News Channel, CNN, ABC News, MSNBC, and CBS News. It was televised in 2008 on an episode of Dr. Phil and was featured as Case #7 in the 2009 E! Entertainment special, Young Beautiful & Vanished: 15 Unthinkable Crimes. The case was also on 20/20 on OWN, and on ID's Unusual Suspects, Vanished in Reno season 6 episode 1. Nevada also implemented Brianna's Law, which mandates that anyone arrested for a felony must give a DNA sample.

== See also ==
- List of solved missing person cases (2000s)
- List of death row inmates in the United States § Nevada
