= Laura Richards (advocate) =

British psychologist and criminal behavior analyst

Laura Richards (born 1976) is a criminal behavioral analyst who previously served in Scotland Yard, and an international expert on domestic violence, stalking, sexual violence, homicide and risk assessment. Richards is the founder of Paladin in 2013, the world's first National Stalking Advocacy Service.

In 2014 Richards was awarded one of Marie Claire's 'Women At the Top'. Richards has a BSc in Psychology and Sociology, an MSc in Forensic and Legal Psychology and is a member of the British Psychological Society.

Richards' work, along with her involvement with the charity Protection Against Stalking is credited with helping to legislate anti-stalking laws and the coercive control law in the UK. Richards is often quoted saying stalking is, "murder in slow motion."

== Podcasts ==
Richards is the co-creator and co-host of the podcast Real Crime Profile distributed by Wondery.

She also created and currently hosts the podcast The Crime Analyst.

== Television ==
Richards is the co-creator and executive producer of the television series The Case of: JonBenét Ramsey on CBS in 2016 and The Case of: Caylee Anthony on Oxygen in 2018.

Richards was consulting producer and on screen expert on 'Dirty John, The Dirty Truth' on Oxygen and Netflix in 2019 and host of the six part show 'Killer in the Family' on Netflix in 2009.

Richards is Executive Producer for Jennifer 42.
