= Patsy Ramsey =

American beauty pageant winner (1956–2006)

- Patsy Ramsey with her daughter JonBenét as a baby.
- Born: Patricia Ann Paugh; December 29, 1956; Parkersburg, West Virginia, U.S.
- Died: June 24, 2006 (aged 49); Roswell, Georgia, U.S.
- Resting place: St. James Episcopal Cemetery; Marietta, Georgia, U.S.
- Education: West Virginia University (BA)
- Spouse: John Bennett Ramsey (m. 1980)
- Children: 2, including JonBenét

Patricia Ann Ramsey (née Paugh; December 29, 1956 – June 24, 2006) was an American beauty pageant winner and the mother of JonBenét Ramsey, a six-year-old child beauty pageant contestant who was found murdered in the Ramsey family home in Boulder, Colorado, on December 26, 1996.

== Background ==
Patricia Ann Paugh was born on December 29, 1956, in Parkersburg, West Virginia, the daughter of Nedra Ellen Ann (née Rymer) and Donald Ray Paugh, an engineer and manager at Union Carbide. She graduated from Parkersburg High School in 1975. She attended West Virginia University, where she belonged to the Alpha Xi Delta sorority, and from which she graduated with a B.A. in journalism in 1978.

She won Miss West Virginia in 1977. Her sister, Pamela Ellen Paugh, won Miss West Virginia at age 24 in 1980.

Patsy was 23 when she married businessman John Ramsey on November 5, 1980. He had three children from his first marriage to Lucinda Pasch from 1966 to 1978, which ended in divorce.

Patsy and John's son, Burke Ramsey, was born on January 27, 1987. She gave birth to their second child, daughter JonBenét, on August 6, 1990, in Atlanta. The family moved to Boulder, Colorado in 1991 for her husband's business. Starting from when her daughter was young, Patsy entered her in children's beauty contests, and she won some titles before the age of six.

== JonBenét's death ==
On the morning after Christmas Day 1996, Patsy telephoned the police at 5:52 a.m. MST, stating that JonBenét was missing and that a lengthy ransom note had been left claiming that she had been kidnapped, demanding $118,000 for her return. Seven hours after Patsy contacted authorities, JonBenét's body was found in an isolated area of the Ramseys' basement. She had been killed by strangulation and a blow to the head. Afterwards, Boulder law enforcement officials declared that Patsy and her husband were "under an umbrella of suspicion" because of their possible involvement in the crime. The couple spent the next 10 years defending themselves against the allegations by insisting that an intruder killed their daughter.

In 1999, a grand jury voted to indict the parents on charges of child abuse resulting in death. Boulder District Attorney Alex Hunter did not sign the indictment. Multiple sources, including members of the grand jury, have confirmed to the Daily Camera that Hunter refused to sign the indictment because he did not think there was sufficient evidence to prove the case beyond a reasonable doubt.

At around the same time, Lou Smit, a homicide detective who had been brought in to solve the case, opined that the Ramseys had been unfairly targeted, and that an intruder was likely responsible for the murder and its staging.

On July 9, 2008—nearly 12 years after their daughter's death and two years after Patsy's death—Boulder District Attorney Mary Lacy issued a letter stating that John Ramsey and his late wife should no longer be considered suspects in their daughter’s death. The decision was based on new DNA evidence that was collected from JonBenét's clothing, which belonged to an unidentified male not part of the family. This particular type of DNA analysis did not exist at the time of the killing.

Boulder County District Attorney Mary Lacy said new DNA tests point to an "unexplained third party" as possibly responsible for the killing. Modern "touch DNA" suggests that a male of Hispanic origin, per updates on DNA and DNA found under JonBenét's fingernails two weeks after the murder, to which Hunter had access, left traces on two separate clothing articles: the undergarment panties and leggings. The official exoneration was done against normal practice, and the Boulder police have still not cleared them.

In 2015, Mark Beckner, retired Boulder Chief of Police, claimed that Mary Lacy had always strongly believed that a mother could not possibly be responsible for the death of her daughter in that fashion, and so sought to exonerate Ramsey, and that the trace DNA found on JonBenét's underwear, believed by the Colorado Bureau of Investigation to be either sweat or saliva, was in such minute quantities (nanograms) that it could have come from the clothing's manufacturing process.

In October 2016, new forensic analysis with more refined techniques revealed that the original DNA deposits contain genetic markers from two persons other than the victim herself. They have never been identified through any government databases.

== Defamation lawsuits ==
Several defamation lawsuits have proceeded through the courts since JonBenét's death. Lin Wood was the plaintiff's lead attorney for John and Patsy Ramsey and for their son, Burke, and has prosecuted defamation claims on their behalf against St. Martin's Press, Time, Inc., The Fox News Channel, American Media, Inc., Star, The Globe, Court TV and The New York Post.

John and Patsy Ramsey were also sued in two separate defamation lawsuits arising from the publication of their book, The Death of Innocence, brought by two individuals named in the book as having been investigated by Boulder police as suspects in JonBenét's death. The Ramseys were defended in those lawsuits by Lin Wood and three other Atlanta attorneys, James C. Rawls, Eric P. Schroeder, and S. Derek Bauer, who obtained dismissal of both lawsuits. In an in-depth decision, U.S. District Court Judge Julie Carnes ruled that "abundant evidence" in the homicide case pointed to an intruder having committed the crime, while "virtually no evidence" implicated the Ramseys.

== Illness and death ==
Ramsey was diagnosed with stage 4 ovarian cancer in 1993 at age 36. After treatment, she remained in remission for nine years until the cancer recurred in 2002. She died at age 49 on June 24, 2006, at her father's house, with her husband by her side. Ramsey was buried at St. James Episcopal Cemetery in Marietta, Georgia, next to her daughter, JonBenét.

== In media ==
Ramsey has been portrayed by Marg Helgenberger in the miniseries Perfect Murder, Perfect Town (CBS); by Judi Evans in the TV movie Getting Away with Murder: The JonBenet Ramsey Story (Fox) (both 2000) ; by Julia Campbell in Lifetime's Who Killed Jonbenet (2016) and Melissa McCarthy in the upcoming limited series The Murder of JonBenét Ramsey for Netflix (2026).

Ramsey was portrayed by Alex Borstein, opposite Michael McDonald as her husband, in two MADtv sketches; Jane Lynch voiced her in the Family Guy episode, "Brian Wallows and Peter's Swallows".

Ramsey was portrayed in the 2001 South Park episode, "Butters' Very Own Episode". The episode strongly implied that Patsy and her husband were responsible for the death of JonBenét. In a 2011 interview, South Park creators Trey Parker and Matt Stone stated that they regretted how the Ramseys were portrayed in the episode.
