= The Murder of JonBenét Ramsey =

Upcoming American true crime drama series

- Genre: True crime drama
- Created by: Harrison Query; Tommy Wallach
- Starring: Melissa McCarthy; Clive Owen; Emily Mitchell; Garrett Hedlund; Alison Pill; Shea Whigham; Owen Teague; Clifton Collins Jr.; Angus K. Caldwell; Jamie Ray Newman
- Country of origin: United States
- Original language: English

Production
- Executive producers: Richard LaGravenese; Harrison Query; Tommy Wallach; David C. Glasser; Ron Burkle; Bob Yari; David Hutkin; Melissa McCarthy; Anne Sewitsky
- Production company: 101 Studios

Original release
- Network: Netflix

The Murder of JonBenét Ramsey is an upcoming American true crime drama miniseries. It stars Melissa McCarthy and Clive Owen as Patsy and John Ramsey, before and after the murder of their daughter JonBenét Ramsey.

== Premise ==
Explores the life of the Ramsey family, before and after the murder of JonBenét Ramsey.

== Cast and characters ==
=== Main ===
- Melissa McCarthy as Patsy Ramsey
- Clive Owen as John Bennett Ramsey
- Emily Mitchell as JonBenét Ramsey
- Garrett Hedlund as Detective Steve Thomas
- Alison Pill as Detective Linda Arndt
- Shea Whigham as District Attorney Alex Hunter
- Owen Teague as Jeff Shapiro
- Clifton Collins Jr. as Detective Thomas Trujillo
- Angus K. Caldwell as Burke Ramsey
- Jamie Ray Newman as Amelia Hunt

=== Recurring ===
- Rory Cochrane as Detective Commander John Eller
- Chris Bauer as Police Chief Tom Koby
- Will Patton as Lou Smit
- Jeremy Bobb as Pete Hofstrom
- Josh Stamberg as Reed Hunt
- John Billingsley as Bill McReynolds

=== Guest ===
- Margo Martindale as Nedra Paugh, Patsy’s mom
- Tzi Ma as Dr. Henry Lee

== Episodes ==
No.	Title	Directed by	Written by	Original release date
1	TBA	TBA	Harrison Query & Tommy Wallach and Richard LaGravenese	December 10, 2026
2	TBA	TBA	Harrison Query & Tommy Wallach and Richard LaGravenese	December 10, 2026
3	TBA	TBA	Harrison Query & Tommy Wallach and Richard LaGravenese	December 10, 2026
4	TBA	TBA	Harrison Query & Tommy Wallach and Richard LaGravenese	December 10, 2026
5	TBA	TBA	Harrison Query & Tommy Wallach and Richard LaGravenese	December 10, 2026
6	TBA	TBA	Harrison Query & Tommy Wallach and Richard LaGravenese	December 10, 2026
7	TBA	TBA	Richard LaGravenese	December 10, 2026
8	TBA	TBA	Richard LaGravenese	December 10, 2026

Anne Sewitsky served as director of the series.

== Production ==
=== Development ===
In March 2024, it was announced MTV Entertainment Studios and 101 Studios had an untitled series revolving around JonBenét Ramsey in development, with Paramount+ potentially distributing. In September 2024, the series was greenlit by Paramount+. In January 2025, it was announced to be titled Unspeakable: The Murder of JonBenét Ramsey.

By August 2025, Paramount Television Studios had taken over production of the series following the merger of MTV Entertainment Studios' parent company Paramount Global with Skydance Media into Paramount Skydance. That same month, Paramount+ opted against releasing the series nor retaining credit, with Netflix acquiring the series.

=== Casting ===
In September 2024, Melissa McCarthy, Clive Owen, Shea Whigham, Will Patton, Garrett Hedlund, Emily Mitchell, Alison Pill, Owen Teague, Clifton Collins Jr., Chris Bauer, Rory Cochrane, Angus K. Caldwell, Jaime Ray Newman and Josh Stamberg joined the cast in series regular and recurring capacity, respectively. In October 2024, John Billingsley and Jeremy Bobb joined the cast in recurring roles.

=== Filming ===
Principal photography commenced in September 2024, in and around Calgary.

== Release ==
In late 2025, following the merger of Skydance Media and Paramount Global, Paramount+ decided to place the completed series in turnaround after a cut of the series was screened and reviewed by the company's new management. In July 2026, Netflix acquired worldwide rights to the series from producer 101 Studios, planning to release it that winter. In September, it was announced that the series would premiere on December 10, 2026.
