= Judi Evans =

American actress

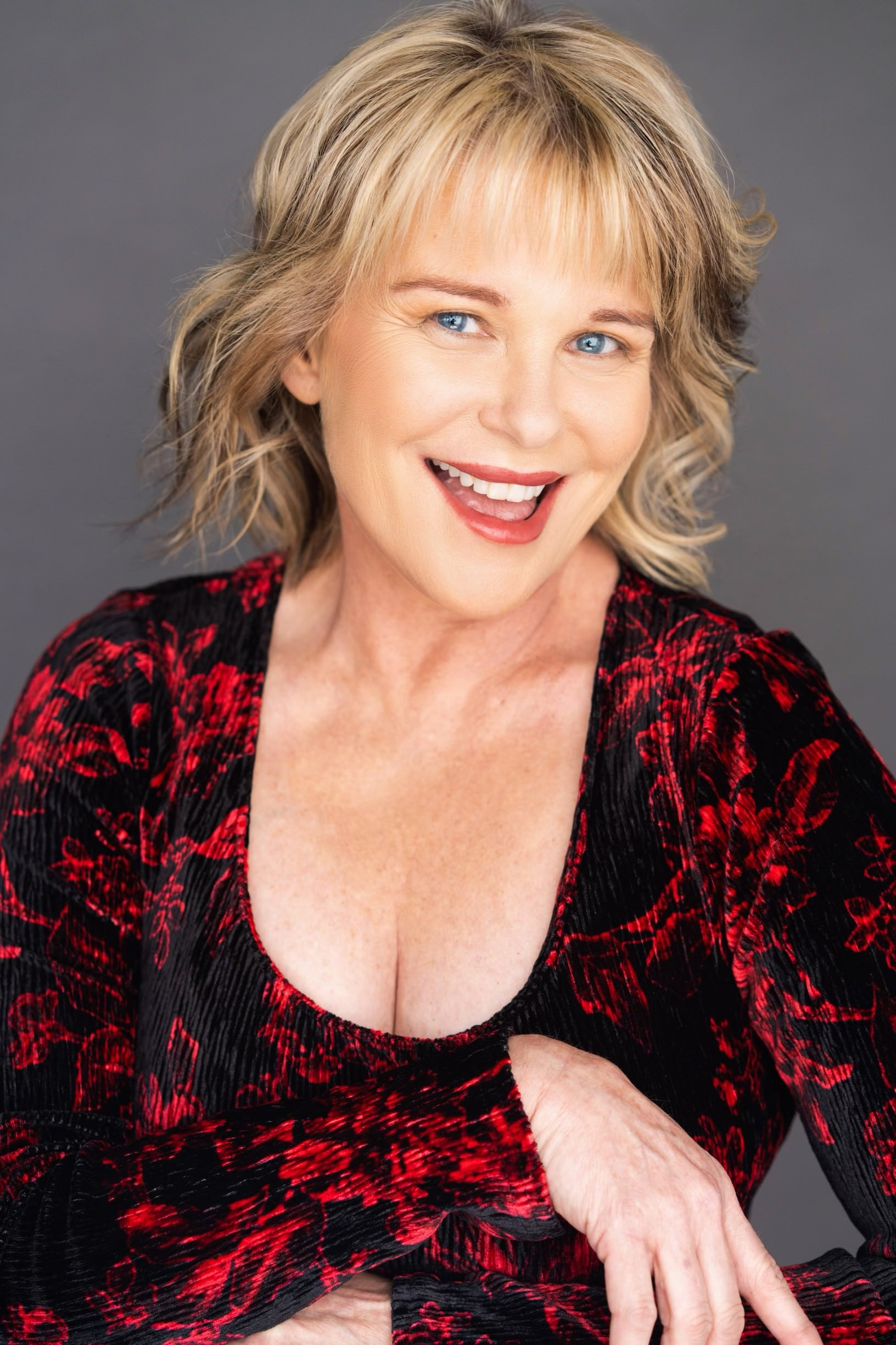
Judi Evans in 2023

Judi Evans (also credited as Judi Evans Luciano, born July 12, 1964) is an American actress.

Evans began her career in daytime in 1983 when she was cast as Becki on Days of Our Lives. She shot to fame shortly after when she was cast as Beth Raines on Guiding Light, for which she won a Daytime Emmy Award at the age of 19.

In 1986, she left Guiding Light and immediately joined the cast of Days of Our Lives as Adrienne Johnson Kiriakis. In 1991, she took over the role of Paulina Cory Carlino on Another World, a role she would continue until the show ended in 1999.

She currently recurs as Bonnie Lockhart on Days of Our Lives.

== Career ==
Judi Evans is a professional "soap-hopper" with multiple, successful appearances on four Daytime Soap Operas.

She began her career, in 1983, on Guiding Light as Beth Raines. In 1986, she moved over to Days of Our Lives to take on the role of Adrienne Johnson-Kiriakis. In 1991, she moved to New York to take over the role of Paulina Cory on Another World. After the conclusion of Another World in 1999, Evans moved back to Los Angeles to begin recurring again on Days of Our Lives, this time taking on double duty as Bonnie Lockhart and Adrienne Johnson-Kiriakis. In 2009, she took on the role of Maeve Stone on As The World Turns.

She currently recurs as Bonnie Lockhart-Kiriakis on Days of Our Lives opposite her longtime co-star Wally Kurth.

In addition to her roles in Daytime, Evans has had a very successful television movie career including roles in Getting Away with Murder: The JonBenet Ramsey Mystery, Love Is on the Air, I Am Not For Sale: The Fight to End Human Trafficking, and Blood Runs Thick.

She guest-starred on the hit CBS show The Mentalist from 2012-2013 and was a series regular on Venice: The Series playing the role of Logan. She also guest-starred on The Bay (online soap opera) in the role of Katherine Blackwell.

== Personal ==
Evans was born in Montebello, California. In 1993, she married Michael Luciano. They had one son, named Austin Michael Luciano, who died unexpectedly in late 2019 at age 23.

In 2020, nearly six months after losing her son, Evans contracted COVID-19 while at the hospital recovering from an accidental injury she incurred during horseback riding. Doctors considered amputating both her legs as part of her treatment, but she, luckily, made a full recovery.

== Filmography ==
Credits
Year	Title	Role	Notes
1983–1986	Guiding Light	Beth Raines	Series regular
1986	Dreams of Gold: The Mel Fisher Story	Penelope Cabot	Television film
1986–1991, 2003–2008, 2010–present	Days of Our Lives	Adrienne Johnson/ Bonnie Lockhart-Kiriakis	Series regular
1991–1999	Another World	Paulina Cory Carlino	Series regular
2000	Getting Away with Murder: The JonBenet Ramsey Mystery	Patsy Ramsey	Television film
2008	Screening Party	Amy	Television film
2009	As the World Turns	Maeve Stone	Contract role
2010	Healing Hands	Connie	Television film
2011–2014	Venice: The Series	Logan	24 episodes
2013	The Grove	Prissy	Television film
2012–2013	The Mentalist	Senator Eillen Dawkins	3 episodes
2014	Ron and Laura Take Back America	Diana	Television film
2014	The Bay	Catherine Blackwell	6 episodes
2016	Mr. And Mrs. Smit	Madam Secretary	1 episode
2018	The Dawn of Zombie Apocalypse	Doctor E	Television film
2018	Deadly Patient	Nurse May Williams	Television film
2019	I Am Not For Sale: The Fight To End Human Trafficking	Judie	Television film
2019	John Wynn's Mirror Mirror	Debbie Wilson	Television film
2021	Love Is on the Air	Miriam Cassidy	Television film
2021	Blood Runs Thick	Catherine	Television film

== Awards ==
Daytime Emmy Awards

- (1984) Daytime Emmy Award for Outstanding Supporting Actress in a Drama Series for Guiding Light (Won)
- (2008) Daytime Emmy Award for Outstanding Supporting Actress in a Drama Series for Days of our Lives (Nominated)

Soap Opera Digest Awards

- (1986) Soap Opera Digest Award Outstanding Daytime Supercouple on a Daytime Serial for Guiding Light (shared with Vincent Irizarry) (Nominated)
- (1993) Soap Opera Digest Award Hottest Female Star for Another World (Nominated)
- (1998) Soap Opera Digest Award Outstanding Supporting Actress for Another World (Won)
- (2005) Soap Opera Digest Award Favorite Return for Days of our Lives (Won)
