= Alice Barrett =

American actress

- Born: December 19, 1956 (age 68); New York, New York, U.S.
- Other names: Alice Barrett-Mitchell
- Education: Hunter College (BA)
- Occupation: Actress
- Children: 2

Alice Barrett (born December 19, 1956) is an American actress.

== Early life and education ==
She was born in New York, New York. She graduated from Hunter College with a bachelor's degree in theatre.

== Career ==
Among her TV and movie credits, Barrett is best known for her portrayal of offbeat, psychic private investigator Frankie Frame Winthrop on the soap opera Another World from 1989 to 1996. She played Jacqui McCormick on The Catlins from 1984 to 1985 and also appeared on As the World Turns and Ryan’s Hope. She guest starred on the season 12 finale of Law & Order: Special Victims Unit in the episode entitled "Smoked".

== Personal life ==
Barrett is also credited by her married name, Alice Barrett-Mitchell. She is the mother of two daughters.

== Filmography ==
=== Film ===
| Year | Title | Role | Notes |
|---|---|---|---|
| 1979 | Incoming Freshmen | Boxing student | |
| 1982 | Mission Hill | Laura | |
| 1999 | Sonic Impact | Shelly Peterson | |
| 2005 | Break a Leg | Lisa | |
| 2007 | The Sandpiper | Vickie Lang | |
| 2008 | Choke | Lanky Woman on Airplane | |
| 2010 | Twelve | White Mike's Mother | |
| 2010 | 13 | Leanne Ferro | |
| 2010 | Weakness | Jean | |
| 2011 | No Expectations | Laura | |
| 2015 | Behind Some Dark Cloud | Sylvia | |
| 2018 | No Alternative | Diane O'Brien | |
| 2019 | Depraved | Mrs. Beaufort | |
| 2019 | Breaker | Linda | |
| 2021 | Soulmate(s) | Rita | |

=== Television ===
| Year | Title | Role | Notes |
|---|---|---|---|
| 1983 | The Catlins | Jacqui McCormick | Episode #1.420 |
| 1989–1999 | Another World | Frankie Frame/Ann O'Donnell | 455 episodes |
| 1997 | Profiler | Colleen Brennehan | Episode: "Old Acquaintance" |
| 2000 | Getting Away with Murder: The JonBenet Ramsey Story | Reporter | Television film |
| 2001 | The District | Sgt. Georgia Carson | Episode: "Night Moves" |
| 2003 | Miracles | Jason's Manager | Episode: "Paul Is Dead" |
| 2006 | Conviction | Kathleen Perry | Episode: "Indebted" |
| 2008 | New Amsterdam | Dr. Evelyn Prender | Episode: "Soldier's Heart" |
| 2008–2010 | One Life to Live | Dr. Morrison | 6 episodes |
| 2010 | Mercy | Mrs. Cone | Episode: "I Did Kill You, Didn't I?" |
| 2011–2015 | Law & Order: Special Victims Unit | Various roles | 3 episodes |
| 2015 | The Following | Jan Tower | Episode: "Flesh & Blood" |
| 2015 | Power | Mrs. Walters | Episode: "Consequences" |
| 2018 | Chicago Med | Ms. Campbell | Episode: "Devil in Disguise" |
| 2018, 2019 | Billions | Anne Jeffcoat | 2 episodes |
| 2021–2023 | Heels | Carol Spade | 15 episodes |
| 2022 | The Thing About Pam | Cathy Singer | 4 episodes |
| 2023 | Cobell Energy | Senator Flanders | 1 episode |
| 2025 | You | Joyce Flannery | 1 episode |
