= John Bennett Ramsey =

American businessman and father of JonBenèt Ramsey (born 1943)

- Born: December 7, 1943 (age 82); Lincoln, Nebraska, U.S.
- Education: Michigan State University (BS, MBA)
- Occupation: Computer firm executive
- Political party: Republican
- Spouses: Lucinda Pasch (m. 1966; div. 1978) Patricia Ann Paugh (m. 1980; died 2006) Jan Rousseaux (m. 2011)
- Children: 5, including JonBenét

John Bennett Ramsey (born December 7, 1943) is an American businessman who is best known as the father of JonBenét Ramsey, the victim of an unsolved homicide.

== Early life and education ==
John Bennett Ramsey was born on December 7, 1943, in Lincoln, Nebraska, the son of Mary Jane (née Bennett) (1919–1978) and James Dudley "Jay" Ramsey (1916–1992), a decorated World War II pilot. He attended Okemos High School in Michigan. In 1966, he graduated from Michigan State University (MSU) with a bachelor's degree in electrical engineering. Ramsey earned a master's degree in business administration from MSU in 1971.

Ramsey joined the Navy in 1966, served as a Civil Engineer Corps officer in the Philippines for three years, and in an Atlanta reserve unit for an additional eight years.

== Career ==
In 1989, Ramsey formed the Advanced Product Group, one of three companies that merged to become Access Graphics. He became president and chief executive officer of Access Graphics, a computer services company that became a subsidiary of Lockheed Martin in 1991.

In 1996, Access Graphics grossed over $1 billion, and Ramsey was named "Entrepreneur of the Year" by the Boulder Chamber of Commerce. Immediately following the murder of his daughter he was "temporarily replaced so the company did not have to bother him about business matters as he grieved", according to Lockheed Martin spokesman Evan McCollum, but Ramsey returned to his job within weeks.

Ramsey, along with his wife Patsy and young son Burke, moved back to Atlanta shortly thereafter. In 1997, Access Graphics was sold to General Electric.

In 2015, Ramsey told Barbara Walters in an interview that the death of JonBenét and the ensuing investigation and cost of the case had drained his finances, and that the notoriety of the case made it difficult for him to find work.

== Case file for JonBenét murder ==
The murder of Ramsey's six-year-old daughter, JonBenét, was the only murder in Boulder, Colorado, in 1996.

The Boulder police considered various scenarios regarding who had committed the murder, with Rolling Stone magazine naming eight possible suspects including John.

Linda Arndt, the detective first assigned to the case, stated in a deposition that she believed John Ramsey was responsible for the murder.

== Grand jury indictment ==
In 1999, a grand jury voted to indict the parents of murdered 6-year-old beauty pageant winner JonBenét Ramsey on charges of child abuse resulting in death and of being accessories to a crime. The indictment alleges that between Christmas Day and December 26, 1996, John and Patsy Ramsey "unlawfully, knowingly, recklessly and feloniously [permitted] a child to be unreasonably placed in a situation which posed a threat of injury to the child's life or health," which resulted in her death.

=== District Attorney is split ===
On July 9, 2008, the Boulder County District Attorney's office announced that, as a result of newly developed DNA sampling and testing techniques known as Touch DNA analysis, the Ramsey family members were no longer considered suspects in the case. In light of the new DNA evidence, Boulder County District Attorney Mary Lacy gave a letter to John Ramsey that same day. Stan Garnett, the current Boulder County DA, regarding Lacy's exoneration letter, said, "This letter is not legally binding. It's a good-faith opinion and has no legal importance."

== Defamation lawsuits ==
Several defamation lawsuits have ensued since JonBenét's murder. L. Lin Wood was the attorney for the Ramsey family, filing defamation claims on their behalf against St. Martin's Press, Time, Inc., The Fox News Channel, American Media, Inc., Star, The Globe, Court TV, and The New York Post.

John and Patsy Ramsey were sued in two separate defamation lawsuits arising from the publication of their book, The Death of Innocence. These suits were brought by two persons named in the book as having been investigated by Boulder police as suspects in JonBenét's murder. The Ramseys were defended in those lawsuits by Lin Wood and three other Atlanta attorneys, James C. Rawls, Eric P. Schroeder, and S. Derek Bauer, who obtained dismissal of both lawsuits, including an in-depth decision by U.S. District Court Judge Julie Carnes that "abundant evidence" pointed to an intruder having committed the murder.

== Political campaign ==
In 2004, Ramsey campaigned for a seat in Michigan's House of Representatives for the 105th district. He received 24.3 percent of the vote in the Republican Party primary, finishing in second place to Kevin Elsenheimer.

== Personal life ==
Ramsey married Lucinda Pasch in 1966. They had three children. The couple divorced in 1978. His eldest daughter, Elizabeth, was killed in a car crash at age 22 in 1992.

Ramsey married his second wife, Patsy Ramsey, in 1980. The couple had two children, Burke and JonBenét. Patsy died of ovarian cancer in 2006 at age 49.

After his wife's death, Ramsey met Beth Holloway, mother of missing Natalee Holloway. It was reported that the two began dating. Ramsey played down their relationship, stating that they "developed a friendship of respect and admiration" out of common interests related to their children.

Ramsey relocated to Moab, Utah, and met his third wife, Jan Rousseaux, in 2011. They later married and purchased a second house in Michigan.

== In media ==
- Ramsey has been portrayed by Ronny Cox in the miniseries Perfect Murder, Perfect Town (CBS); by Cliff DeYoung in the TV movie Getting Away with Murder: The JonBenet Ramsey Story (Fox) (both 2000); by Michel Gill in Lifetime's Who Killed JonBenet (2016) and Clive Owen in The Murder of JonBenét Ramsey for Netflix (2026).
- The Ramseys were also portrayed in the 2001 South Park episode "Butters' Very Own Episode". In a 2011 interview, South Park creators Trey Parker and Matt Stone stated that they regretted how the Ramseys were portrayed in the episode.
- The Ramseys were also portrayed in two MADtv sketches, one parodying Hollywood Squares, with John portrayed by Michael McDonald and Patsy by Alex Borstein.
- Ramsey appears in the documentary series Cold Case: Who Killed JonBenét Ramsey directed by Joe Berlinger for Netflix.
