= L. Lin Wood =

American former attorney (born 1952)

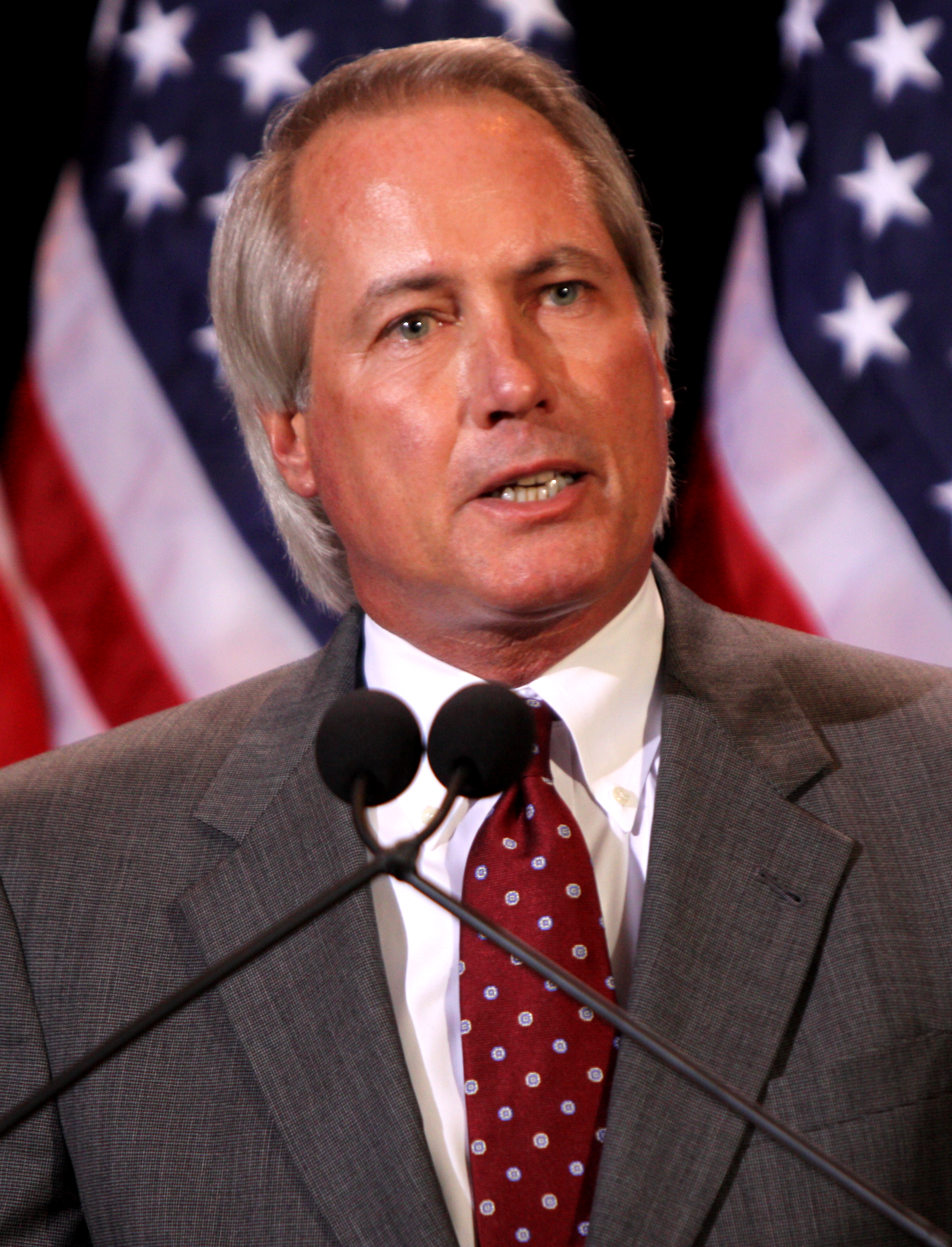
- Wood in 2011
- Born: Lucian Lincoln Wood Jr. October 19, 1952 (age 74); Raleigh, North Carolina, U.S.
- Education: Mercer University (BA, JD)
- Occupation: Attorney
- Years active: 1977–2023
- Political party: Republican
- Website: linwoodlaw.com

Lucian Lincoln Wood Jr. (born October 19, 1952) is an American former attorney who made claims about the existence of widespread election fraud during the 2020 US presidential election. He has faced legal sanctions for lawsuits made in furtherance of these claims in the state of Michigan. In July 2023, while facing investigation and possible disciplinary action by the State Bar of Georgia for violating the Georgia Rules of Professional Conduct, Wood retired and surrendered his law license rather than face disbarment.

Following his graduation from law school in 1977, Wood worked as a personal injury lawyer, focusing on medical malpractice litigation. He became known as a "celebrity lawyer" specializing in defamation lawsuits. Wood represented Richard Jewell, the security guard falsely accused in the Centennial Olympic Park bombing in Atlanta in 1996. Wood's representation of Jewell helped transform him from a personal injury lawyer to a nationally known defamation lawyer. He also represented the family of JonBenét Ramsey and former U.S. representative Gary Condit in defamation suits. He was also hired by Republican political candidate Herman Cain to respond to allegations of sexual harassment.

By 2020, Wood promoted conspiracy theories, both in his capacity as a lawyer and as a political commentator and social media personality. After Joe Biden won that year's presidential election, Wood promoted conspiracy theories on behalf of President Donald Trump, who he claimed actually won the election with 70% of the vote. Wood claimed that a secret cabal of international communists, Chinese intelligence, and Republican officials had contrived to steal the election from Trump. Sometimes in association with Trump's attorney, Sidney Powell, Wood litigated on the president's behalf in many failed lawsuits, which sought to prevent the certification of ballots in the presidential election. In the latter part of 2020, Wood's calls for the imprisonment of Georgia Governor Brian Kemp and Secretary of State Brad Raffensperger, based on the theory that the two Republican officials worked with the Chinese to help rig the vote for Biden, and the execution of Vice President Mike Pence "by firing squad" attracted considerable attention.

Judge Craig A. Karsnitz of the Superior Court for the State of Delaware revoked Wood's permission to appear pro hac vice before the Court. In August 2021, U.S. District Judge Linda Parker of the Eastern District of Michigan formally sanctioned Wood, Powell, and seven other pro-Trump lawyers for their suit seeking to overturn Trump's election loss.

== Early life and education ==
Wood was born in Raleigh, North Carolina, and was raised in Macon, Georgia, from the age of three. He stated that his family struggled financially, with frequent episodes of domestic abuse involving his parents. He has one sister, Diane Wood Stern, born February 1951, deceased in 2023, and a half-sister, Linda Martin Riggins, born in 1946. After a school dance, the then 16-year-old Wood returned home to find his father had beaten his mother to death. L. Lin Wood Sr. pleaded guilty to involuntary manslaughter, a charge reduced from first-degree murder. He served a little over two years in prison. Wood has stated that it was this experience that solidified his earlier decision to become a lawyer.

Wood lived with friends and graduated from Mark Smith High School in Macon, Georgia, in 1970. He attended Mercer University, graduating cum laude in 1974, and Mercer University School of Law, graduating cum laude in 1977. He was admitted to the Georgia Bar. From 1977 to 1996, Wood litigated personal injury cases and medical malpractice cases in the State of Georgia.

== Career ==
Lin Wood rose to prominence after representing Richard Jewell, who was falsely accused of perpetrating the 1996 Centennial Olympic Park bombing in Atlanta, and he subsequently represented clients in high-profile defamation cases.

=== Notable clients ===
==== Richard Jewell ====
Wood's first libel and defamation client was Richard Jewell, the security guard accused in the Centennial Olympic Park bombing in Atlanta in 1996. Wood sued a number of media outlets, as well as Jewell's employer. Wood reached monetary settlements from Jewell's employer, CNN, and NBC, while Time published a clarification, but paid no settlement. In 2012, after fifteen years of litigation, the Georgia Supreme Court upheld trial court decisions ruling against Jewell in his libel suit against the Atlanta Journal-Constitution.

==== John and Patsy Ramsey ====
Jewell was quickly followed by other high-profile cases, including John and Patsy Ramsey, the parents of JonBenét Ramsey, whose 1996 murder is still unsolved. Wood represented John and Patsy Ramsey and their son Burke, pursuing defamation claims on their behalf against St. Martin's Press, Time Inc., The Fox News Channel, American Media, Inc., Star, The Globe, Court TV and The New York Post. The lawsuit against Star was settled.

John and Patsy Ramsey were also sued in two separate defamation lawsuits arising from the publication of their book, The Death of Innocence. The suit was brought by two individuals named in the book as having been investigated by Boulder police as suspects in JonBenét's murder. The Ramseys were defended in those lawsuits by Lin Wood and three other Atlanta attorneys, James C. Rawls, Eric P. Schroeder, and S. Derek Bauer. The lawsuits against the Ramseys were dismissed.

In 2016, Wood represented Burke Ramsey, older brother of murder victim JonBenet Ramsey, in a pair of related lawsuits stemming from the CBS network docuseries The Case of JonBenét Ramsey. The first suit was filed against Dr. Werner Spitz, a Michigan-based forensic pathologist, over his assertion in a promotional CBS Detroit radio interview that Burke killed his sister when she was a young child. The other suit was against CBS and other parties involved in the docuseries, where the same allegations were made. Both lawsuits were settled out of court.

==== Kyle Rittenhouse ====
Teenager Kyle Rittenhouse was charged with homicide in August 2020, and detained on bail pending his trial. Wood and lawyer John Pierce formed Rittenhouse's initial defense team, although neither were licensed to practice in Wisconsin, where the case was filed. For Rittenhouse's defense, they solicited donations to the "FightBack Foundation", a Texas-based nonprofit they had both founded. The Journal Sentinel quoted several defense lawyers criticizing their involvement and potential conflict of interest over their control of the donated money. In November, Pierce posted Rittenhouse's $2 million bail with money donated to FightBack. Wood left the defense team in early December, repurposing FightBack for his election-related litigation. Days later, the prosecutor in the case alleged that FightBack was an "unregulated and opaque ‘slush fund’", and that the donations to the defense should have instead been held in a trust.

Rittenhouse later said that the foundation had fundraised without his family's permission, and that he had fired Wood due to the latter's belief in QAnon and election fraud. Rittenhouse and his mother alleged that Wood had wanted to postpone paying Rittenhouse's bail, because Wood believed that society would break down after the election and that Rittenhouse would be safer in jail. Law&Crime obtained a recording supporting this allegation.

In September 2021, Wood said that FightBack was owed Rittenhouse's $2 million bail money. FightBack was eventually awarded $925,000.

==== Other clients ====
Wood represented former U.S. Congressman Gary Condit, and the alleged victim in the Kobe Bryant case.

In November 2011, Wood was hired by then-presidential candidate Herman Cain, in his efforts to fight off sexual harassment accusations.

Wood was a lead attorney in a whistleblower case against DaVita Healthcare. The suit was settled in 2015 for $450 million plus up to $45 million in fees.

Wood was the lead attorney in Nicholas Sandmann's defamation suits against a number of media companies, including CNN and The Washington Post. Sandmann, a student at Covington Catholic High School, was a party to the January 2019 Lincoln Memorial confrontation. In January 2020, Wood settled with CNN, and in July 2020, the suit was settled with The Washington Post.

In December 2019, Wood lost a multi-million defamation case for Vernon Unsworth against Elon Musk who had branded him a "pedo guy". The case was lost because the jury felt that Musk's tweet did not properly identify Unsworth, as he was not mentioned by name.

In 2020 and 2021, Wood represented U.S. representative for Georgia's 14th congressional district, Marjorie Taylor Greene. He also represented Mark and Patricia McCloskey, the couple who aimed firearms towards Black Lives Matter protestors in St. Louis in June 2020.

=== 2020 elections and QAnon ===
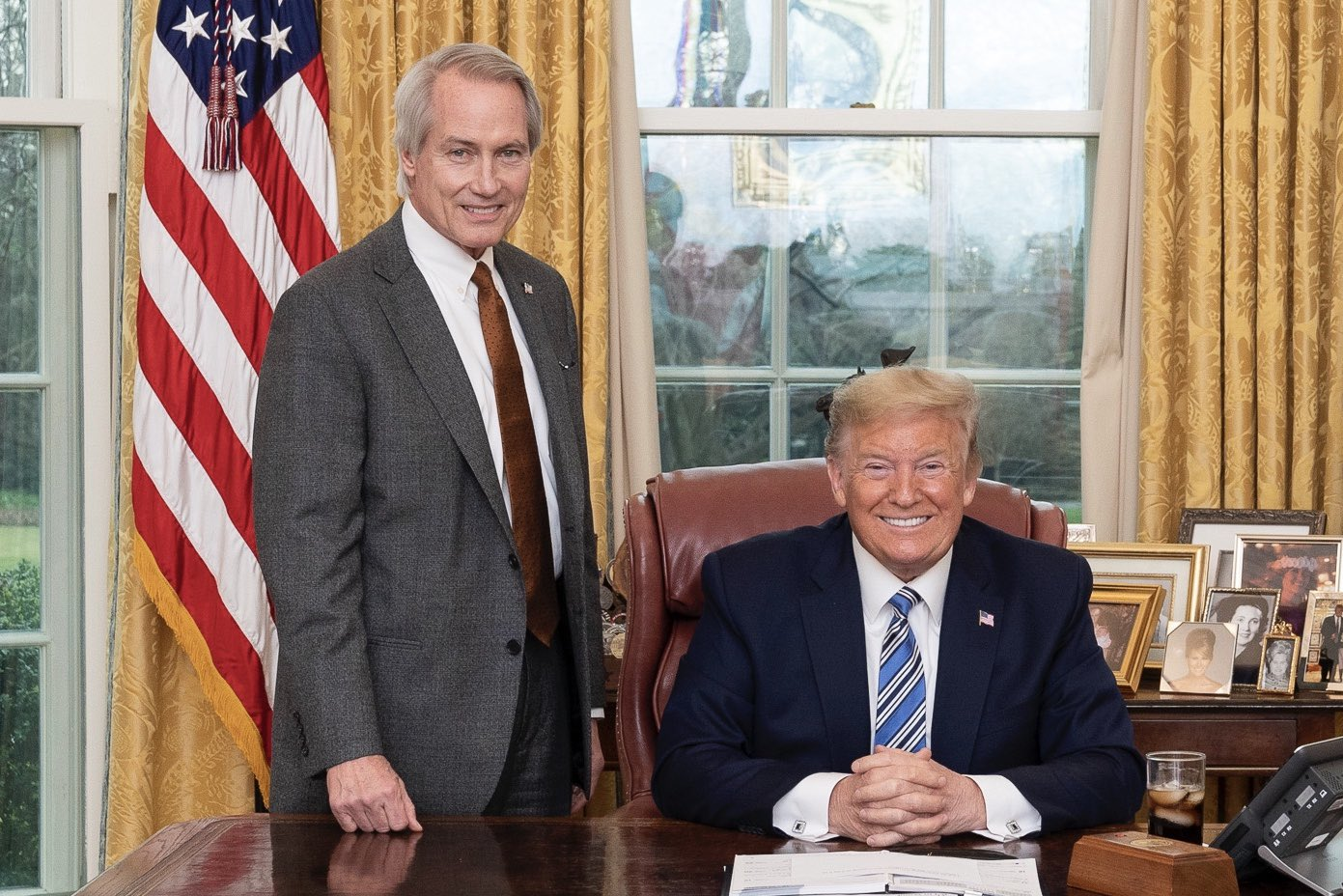
Wood with President Donald Trump in March 2020

Wood has claimed that President Trump won the 2020 presidential election with 70% of the vote (which would have been the largest popular vote margin in American history), and that a secret cabal of international communists, Chinese intelligence, and Republican officials had conspired to steal the election from Trump. While litigating on Trump's behalf, he asserted to the media and in court that more votes were cast in Michigan during the 2020 presidential election than the entire population of eligible voters in the state, a conclusion he drew from a mistaken comparison of the Michigan vote total with Minnesota population data.

Wood has circulated multiple videos alleging that Cobb County, Georgia shredded evidence of voter fraud in the November 2020 general election, and his Twitter profile includes the hashtag #WWG1WGA (where we go one, we go all), a slogan associated with the far-right QAnon conspiracy theory.

Wood called for would-be Republican voters to "threaten to withhold your votes" and monetary support for Georgia's Republican candidates for the Senate, incumbents David Perdue and Kelly Loeffler, if they did not demand "investigations" into the election.

At the end of December 2020, Wood launched a series of allegations on Twitter: he implied that Chief Justice John Roberts was involved in the death of Justice Antonin Scalia, suggested that Roberts was a child trafficker, declared that the deceased Jeffrey Epstein was actually alive, and that Epstein could reveal the truth about Roberts. At the start of January 2021, Wood declared his belief that Vice President Mike Pence would "face execution by firing squad" for "treason", after Pence's lawyers fought a lawsuit which was aimed at making Pence refuse to count electoral votes for Joe Biden. Wood also called for Roberts and Senate Majority Leader Mitch McConnell to be arrested for treason. Wood was criticized for these comments, and responded by insisting that he is not insane.

In early January 2021, Wood continued promoting conspiracy theories linked to QAnon, alleging that Roberts had committed child rape and child murder, and was being blackmailed for this by ten intelligence agencies of various nations. Wood said that hacker group Lizard Squad obtained the information; a former member of Lizard Squad denied this. Wood also claimed that QAnon supporter Isaac Kappy was murdered for attempting to transmit the information to then-President Trump (Kappy committed suicide in 2019). On January 11, 2021, Delaware Superior Court Judge Craig A. Karsnitz gave Wood's social media postings in his published reasons for an order revoking Wood's right to appear before the court. Karsnitz described the allegations about Roberts as "too disgusting and outrageous to repeat," and stated that he had "no doubt" that Wood's tweets (along with "many other things") played a role in inciting the attack on the Capitol that occurred a few days before.

On January 6, 2021, before the College vote count, through a Twitter Post, Wood called for the immediate resignation of Vice President Mike Pence, Deputy Attorney general Rod Rosenstein and Supreme Court Justice John Roberts and asserted that charges should be brought against Pence and Rosenstein. His Twitter account was permanently suspended after the January 2021 storming of the Capitol by a pro-Trump mob. After the attack on the Capitol, Wood claimed that members of the pro-Trump mob were antifa activists in disguise and that Vice President Mike Pence was a "child molester". Wood subsequently called for the execution of Pence on Parler, writing, "Get the firing squads ready. Pence goes FIRST." Parler removed several of Wood's posts due to violations of their community guidelines, including the one calling for Pence's execution.

==== Georgia ====
On November 13, 2020, after Joe Biden defeated Trump in the presidential election in Georgia, Wood filed a lawsuit in the federal district court in Atlanta, naming himself as plaintiff. Wood claimed that Georgia's procedures for handling absentee ballots had been unconstitutional since March 2020 and sought to block certification of the state's election results. Wood later also claimed that Georgia's recounting of votes was flawed.

Wood's lawsuit failed on November 19, 2020, when U.S. District Judge Steven Grimberg, who was appointed by Trump, found "no basis in fact or in law" to stop Georgia's certification of its election results at such a late stage, as this would "breed confusion and potential disenfranchisement". The judge ruled that Wood had no legal standing to bring the lawsuit, and had brought the case too late. Wood failed to show that he had been harmed, while his proposal would "harm the public in countless ways".

A three-judge panel on the U.S. Court of Appeals for the Eleventh Circuit unanimously affirmed the district court's dismissal of the suit on December 5, 2020. The court found that Wood had failed "to allege a particularized injury" and his request to delay certification was in any case moot because Georgia had by then already certified its election results.

On December 18, 2020, Wood filed another lawsuit in the U.S. District Court for the Northern District of Georgia. Wood sought an emergency injunction to halt the Senatorial runoff election for the two United States Senate seats from Georgia. The complaint contained a remarkable typographical error in that it was verified by Wood "under plenty of perjury" rather than "under penalty of perjury". U.S. District Judge Timothy Batten denied Wood's request for a temporary restraining order on December 28, 2020, stating that Wood lacked standing to file the lawsuit, that his claims of potential voter fraud were "too speculative," and that overall the lawsuit had "no basis in fact or law."

==== Michigan ====
On December 7, 2020, Wood lost the federal lawsuits he litigated with Sidney Powell in Michigan, where they had argued to overturn Joe Biden's victory in the state and award the victory to President Donald Trump. In denying their request for relief, U.S. District Judge Linda V. Parker stated that the plaintiffs had only offered "theories, conjecture, and speculation" of potential vote switching, that the "ship has sailed" for most of the relief requested, and that much of what was sought "is beyond the power of any court". Parker also suggested that Wood and Powell's motive for filing the case was not to win, but to shake "people's faith in the democratic process and their trust in our government" and that granting their requests would "greatly harm the public interest."

In January 2021, the City of Detroit filed a motion to call for sanctions against Wood, Powell, and other lawyers who filed the unsuccessful case challenging Michigan's election results. In a July 2021 court hearing, Wood argued that he could not be sanctioned. He said his name was "placed on" the complaint, but he "had no involvement whatsoever with it". Wood said that he had "generally indicated" to Powell that if she required a "trial lawyer", he would "certainly be willing or available to help her", while Powell said she believed that she added Wood to the case with him knowing about it, but also said that may have been a "misunderstanding". Although the court prohibited "broadcasting of judicial proceedings", Wood posted a two-minute video of the court hearing on the Telegram messaging application, later deleting it.

On August 25, 2021, the Court ruled that Wood, Powell, and the other plaintiff's counsel "filed this lawsuit in bad faith and for an improper purpose"; ordered them to pay attorney's fees of some of the defendants; and referred them to their respective state bars for disciplinary action. The court determined that the pro-Trump attorneys had participated in "a historic and profound abuse of the judicial process," namely filing a baseless, frivolous lawsuit in order to undermine public confidence in the democratic process.

==== Delaware ====
Based on his actions in election-related cases, Judge Karsnitz ordered Wood to show cause why his right to appear pro hac vice in a Delaware Superior Court defamation case where he was representing Carter Page; Wood's right to appear was revoked on January 11, 2021, even though Wood had requested to withdraw his application for pro hac vice admission and his appearance in the Page case. Wood made this request to withdraw even after having made a legal argument that revocation of his pro hac vice admission was not warranted.

In explaining his decision, Judge Karsnitz wrote that Wood's actions in the Georgia and Wisconsin election-related lawsuits "exhibited a toxic stew of mendacity, prevarication, and surprising incompetence." Karsnitz claimed that a “Court's finding in Georgia...indicates” that one of two cases filed by Mr. Wood as a plaintiff was "textbook frivolous litigation". Yet, the Supreme Court of the State of Delaware pointed out that “neither the Georgia trial court nor the Eleventh Circuit of Appeals, to which Wood appealed, made any findings that Wood's complaint was frivolous or filed in bad faith.”

Disregarding both the fact that Wood never signed the Wisconsin pleadings and that Wood was listed as “Counsel of Notice,” Judge Karsnitz nonetheless concluded that Wood was responsible for the Wisconsin case filed by Sidney Powell, the pleadings of which Judge Karsnitz further opined "would not survive a law school civil procedure class."

Karsnitz was highly critical of Wood's social media postings, though he stated that his decision was based on Wood's litigation conduct. Judge Karsnitz concluded that he was satisfied that "it would be inappropriate and inadvisable to continue Mr. Wood's permission to practice before this court."

On January 19, 2022, the Delaware Supreme Court vacated Karsnitz's decision to revoke Wood's pro hac vice to practice in Delaware, permitting Wood to withdraw voluntarily. The Court found the lower court's “insinuation” that Wood was even partially responsible for January 6 without any supporting evidence or opportunity for Wood to respond was “indicative of an unfair process” was beyond the scope of the Rule to Show Cause. The Delaware Supreme Court likewise found the [lower] court's opinion suggested its intent to smear Wood's reputation. finding that the revocation “was an abuse of discretion.”

==== Grand Jury Testimony ====
On November 9, 2022, Mr. Wood was one of 61 witnesses who testified before a special purpose grand jury, convened by Fulton County prosecutor Fani Willis in the matter of President Donald Trump, Georgia v. Trump et al. Case# 23SC188947

=== Law firm break-up ===
In August 2020, Wood was sued by three of his former law firm colleagues, in a lawsuit which alleged that Wood owed them money because he breached a contract regarding a settlement between them when the trio tried to leave his law firm. The lawsuit also alleged that Wood had assaulted one of them, and that between late 2019 and February 2020, Wood sent "abusive" and "incoherent" communications and referred to himself as the "Almighty".

Wood responded that the lawsuit was a "shakedown" for money, claiming that the communications were "irrelevant" and from "a difficult time in my personal life arising primarily from my family's reaction to my faith in Jesus Christ."

On June 5, 2023, Wood was sanctioned $5,000.00 for criminal contempt, and on September 18, 2023, ordered to pay Plaintiff's attorneys’ fees of $42,445.00 in violation of the October 8, 2020 Injunction Order, for “Wood's willful violations of the injunction on, at a minimum, five separate occasions”.

On August 5, 2024, the Fulton County Court's (live video) extended motions, his second criminal contempt hearing determined Wood violated the non-disparagement order.

On September 9, 2024 Judge Scott F. McAfee ruled that Wood violated his June 5, 2023 warning of additional sanctions for violating the original non-disparagement order and was ordered to pay the Plaintiffs $105,000 for seven separate incidents, within fourteen days. He warned Wood that any future violation of the nondisparagement order would elicit a $25,000 fine and could strip him of his defenses in the ongoing case.

==== Breach of Contract/Fraud Trial ====
The breach of contract/Fraud trial of WGW et al. v. Wood et al. Case# 2020cv339937 commenced May 5, 2025 through May 15, 2025. On Day 3 of the trial, the judge opined without the jury present, that defendant Wood was "essentially unmanageable".

On May 30, 2025, the total judgment was revised from a jury verdict of $11,445,376.99 to $9,661,177.00, with interest accruing daily. The Judge ruled that plaintiffs must elect either the remedy of breach of contract or fraud; that “separate transactions” were not established to justify two separate awards. Plaintiffs elected fraud.

On September 10, 2025, Wood filed a Notice of Appeal, but no supersedeus bond was posted.

On November 5, 2025, the presiding judge ordered defendant Wood to obtain a $1 million supersedeus bond within 30 days or be subject to property seizure.

On April 13, 2026 the Georgia Court of Appeals Case# A26A1640 dismissed Wood's Motion for Reconsideration to obtain a Supersedeus Bond due to lack of jurisdiction.

“A notice of appeal must be filed within 30 days of entry of the judgment or trial court order sought to be appealed. OCGA § 5-6-38 (a). The proper and timely filing of a notice of appeal is an absolute requirement to confer appellate jurisdiction on this Court. Perlman v. Perlman, 318 Ga. App. 731, 739(4) (734 SE2d 560) (2012). Wood did not file his notice of appeal until 34 days after the court's November 5 order. And though Wood filed his appeal within 30 days of the order denying his motion for reconsideration, the denial of such a motion is not subject to direct appeal.”

On May 28, 2026, Judge Scott McAfee denied Wood's status for indigence and granted the plaintffs’ long pending motion for Writ of Fieri Facias.

On June 1, 2026 Wood pro se filed his appellate brief, Case# A26A1639. Oral arguments are pending.

On October 29, 2026, the appellate court affirmed the lower court ruling, without oral argument and without publication.

==== Federal defamation trial ====
commenced August 7, 2024. Prior to trial, partial summary judgment was awarded to plaintiffs, Wade, Grunberg, and Wilson. On August 15, a jury decided in favor of the three former colleagues, awarding them $3.75 million. On August 16, 2024, phase II, the jury returned a verdict for attorney's fees of $750,000, although the time sheets accrued $610,834.46.

On August 11, 2025, Wood filed his appellate brief, Case#24-12999. Oral arguments are pending.

=== State Bar investigation ===
In 2021, the Georgia State Bar commenced an investigation to determine whether Wood violated the state's rules of professional conduct in his election-related litigation. As part of that investigation the state bar sought a mental health examination of Wood, which Wood unsuccessfully attempted to block. Wood was later, separately referred to the Georgia State Bar for possible discipline over the Michigan election litigation in which he participated, a lawsuit the Michigan judge found was filed "in bad faith and for improper purpose."

=== Surrender of law license ===
On July 4, 2023, facing sanctions up to and including possible disbarment due to his election litigation, Wood requested to change his status from "active" to "retired," and surrendered his license to practice law in Georgia. In return, the State Bar agreed to drop all disciplinary proceedings against Wood. According to letters Wood posted to his Telegram account, his request to retire was "unqualified, irrevocable and permanent", and he can never practice law in the United States again. State Bar officials said that Wood's retirement had "achieved the goals of disciplinary action, including protecting the public and the integrity of the judicial system and the legal profession."

== Views ==
Wood is a 9/11 truther, claiming "no planes" hit the World Trade Center and Pentagon on September 11, 2001, and that the planes visible in the footage are CGI.

He has expressed flat Earther sentiments, posting on Telegram, "Is the Earth flat or is it a spinning ball??? The answer is found in the Holy Bible. Do the research. Connect the dots. Draw your own conclusion."

== Personal life ==
Wood lived in Atlanta, Georgia from 1980 until 2020. In April 2020 he purchased property in South Carolina, and moved there later that year. He formally changed his legal residency to South Carolina in February 2021. In February 2021, Georgia Secretary of State Brad Raffensperger's office announced that it was investigating the possibility that Wood had committed voter fraud due to questions over whether Wood had been a legal resident of the state when he cast his vote in the 2020 elections in Georgia. According to Georgia law, if someone moves to another state with the intention of establishing residence, they are no longer a resident of Georgia.

Wood has five children, two of whom are attorneys, and the eldest is director of admissions at University of Georgia School of Law. According to documents submitted in court, Wood is estranged from his adult children and his five biological grandchildren.

In 2016, Wood and Mercer University announced a one million dollar fund set up by Wood at his alma mater to be called the "L. Lin Wood Fund for the Enhancement of Mercer Law School".
