= Ronny Cox =

American actor (born 1938)

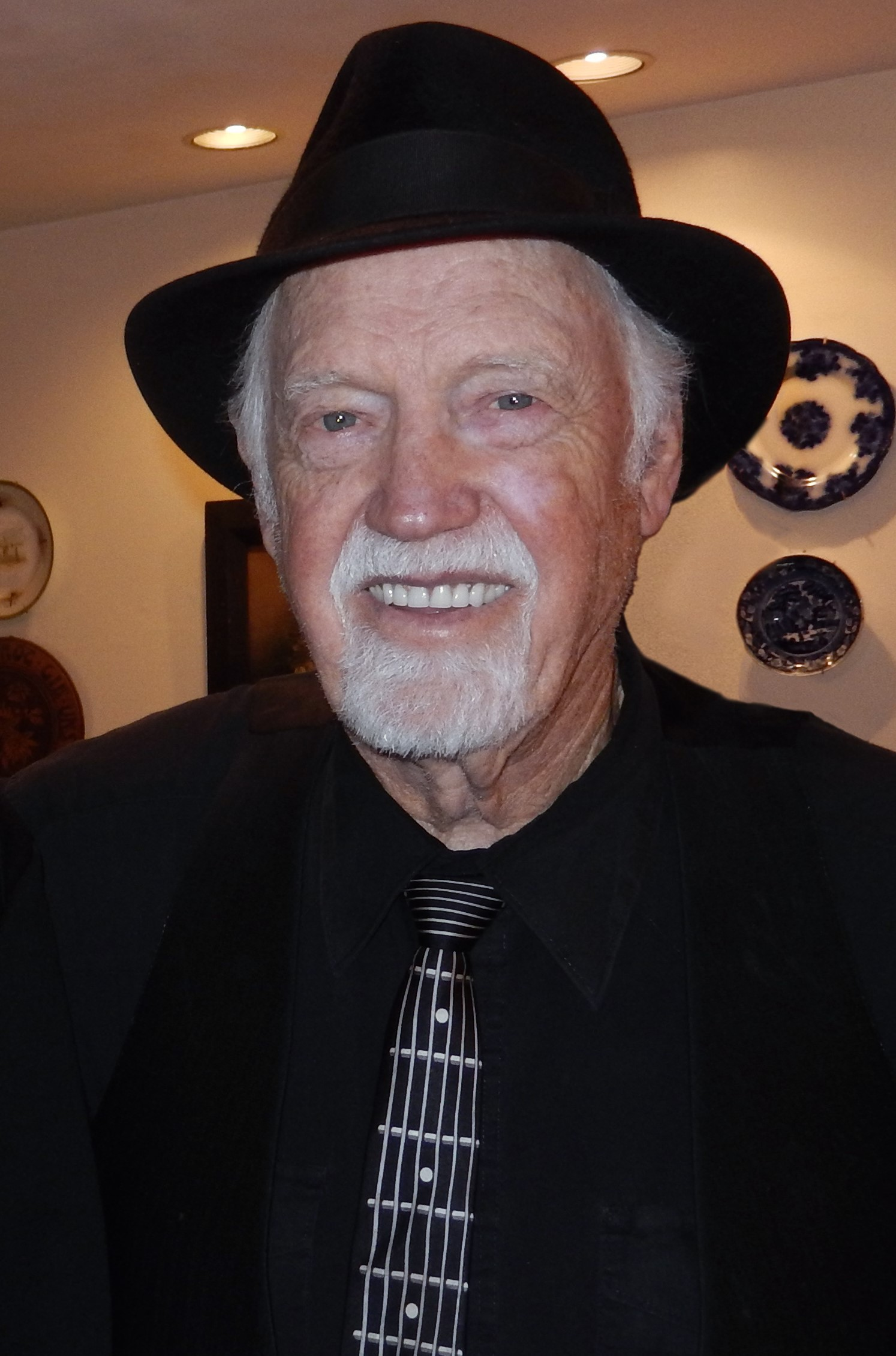
- Cox in 2019
- Born: Daniel Ronald Cox; July 23, 1938 (age 88); Cloudcroft, New Mexico, U.S.
- Education: Eastern New Mexico University
- Occupations: Actor; singer; songwriter; storyteller
- Years active: 1972–present
- Spouse: Mary Cox (m. 1960; died 2006)
- Children: 2
- Website: ronnycox.com

Daniel Ronald Cox (born July 23, 1938) is an American actor and musician. He has appeared in numerous films and television series since his acting debut in Deliverance (1972). He is best known for his roles in Beverly Hills Cop (1984), RoboCop (1987), and Total Recall (1990). He is also active as a musician, performing over 100 times per year at festivals and theaters as of 2012.

== Family life ==
Daniel Ronald Cox was born on July 23, 1938 in the mountain town of Cloudcroft, New Mexico, the third of five children to Lounette (née Rucker) and Bob P. Cox, a carpenter who also worked at a dairy. He grew up in Portales, New Mexico.

Cox met his wife Mary when she was 11 and he was 14. They began dating when she was 15 and he was 18. They married in 1960 and had two sons. Cox graduated from Eastern New Mexico University in 1963 with a double major in theater and speech correction. Mary died in 2006, 50 years to the day of their first date. Cox often talks about her during his music performances.

== Acting career ==
Cox made his debut in the 1972 film Deliverance. In one scene, he plays the instrumental "Dueling Banjos" on his guitar with a banjo-playing mountain boy, played by child actor Billy Redden. He was hired for the role because he could play the guitar. Cox published his autobiography in 2012, recounting his experiences making the film.

In 1974, Cox starred in the short-lived family-oriented series entitled Apple's Way, created by Earl Hamner, creator of The Waltons. He also appeared as Mr. Webb in a television production of Our Town. In 1977, he appeared in the episode "Devil Pack" from the series Quinn Martin's Tales of the Unexpected. In 1984, 12 years after Deliverance, Cox again played a member of a small group of men who are lost, this time in the Nevada desert, and being chased by bloodthirsty locals in the low-budget film Raw Courage. One of Cox's roles was that of Dr. John Gideon during the final season of the television medical drama St. Elsewhere. His character was mooned by Dr. Donald Westphall (Ed Flanders) at the end of the third episode of season six. Cox's first role in a big-budget film came in 1984 as Lt. Andrew Bogomil in Beverly Hills Cop, and he returned to the role in Beverly Hills Cop II in 1987. That same year, Cox appeared in the Paul Verhoeven film RoboCop as corporate arch-villain Richard "Dick" Jones. In 1986, Cox played the mayor in season 3, episodes 1 and 2, "Death Stalks the Big Top", of the TV series Murder, She Wrote.

In 1990, Cox co-starred as Los Angeles Police Chief Roger Kendrick in the short-lived Cop Rock, presenting a striking physical resemblance to the real-world incumbent Chief Daryl Gates. He also appeared as the antagonistic Mars Administrator Vilos Cohaagen in Total Recall the same year. Cox had a guest role on Star Trek: The Next Generation as Captain Edward Jellico in the two-part episode "Chain of Command". He also played Henry Mason, the father of Bree Van de Kamp (Marcia Cross) on Desperate Housewives. In 1997, Cox portrayed the fictional President of the United States Jack Neil in the movie Murder at 1600. Cox also portrayed John Ramsey in the 2000 TV film Perfect Murder, Perfect Town and Senator/Vice President Robert Kinsey in Stargate SG-1.

Cox had a role in The Starter Wife. He played Pappy McCallister, the husband of Molly Kagan's best friend Joan. He occasionally has done animation work, lending his voice to the Tyrusian deserter Doc in Invasion America and Senator McMillan in Todd McFarlane's Spawn. Cox guest-starred in an episode of Matthew Perry's 2011 series Mr. Sunshine.

Cox played Walter Kenney in Dexter, season six, episode three ("Smokey and the Bandit"). His character was a serial killer known as "The Tooth Fairy", whom Dexter had idolized while growing up. He guest-starred in an episode of Diagnosis Murder entitled "The Pressure to Murder", episode 9, season three. Cox played Gideon Claybourne on season 6 of Nashville in 2018.

Starting in 2022, Cox reprised his role as now-Admiral Edward Jellico in several episodes of Star Trek: Prodigy.

== Music career ==
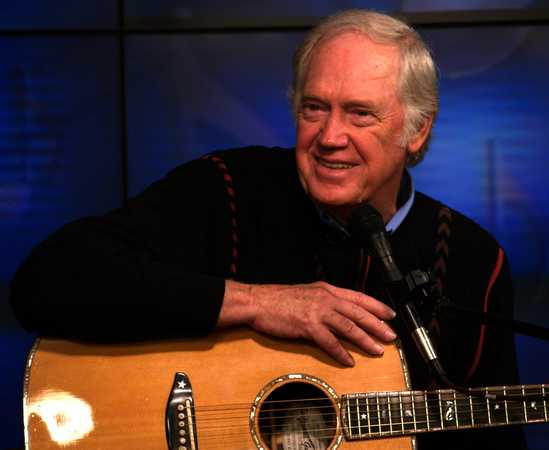
Cox in 2006

Despite having a successful acting career, Cox said that music now comes first in his life. He turns down about 90% of the acting jobs he is offered to play over 100 shows at festivals and theaters each year. He is accompanied by his band. Cox also leads a musical tour to Ireland each year.

On November 2, 2019, Cox was inducted into the New Mexico Music Hall of Fame.

On July 25, 2021, Cox won the New Mexico Music Awards with the Norman Petty Producers Award going to Tom (Panda) Ryan for his recording of Ronny Cox's Live at the Kitchen Sink featuring the 2021 Best Folk Music Award with his song, "Portales". Live at the Kitchen Sink was recorded at The Kitchen Sink Recording Studio in Santa Fe, New Mexico.

== Filmography ==
- 1972 Deliverance as Drew Ballinger
- 1972 The Mind Snatchers as Sergeant Boford Miles
- 1972 Bonanza, episode "New Man" as Lucas
- 1974 Apple's Way (TV) 2 seasons as George Apple
- 1974 A Case of Rape as David Harrod
- 1975 Who Is the Black Dahlia? as Sergeant Finis Brown
- 1976 Bound for Glory as Ozark Bule
- 1977 Quinn Martin's Tales of the Unexpected, episode "Devil Pack" (TV) as Jerry Colby
- 1977 The Car as Deputy Luke Johnson
- 1977 The Girl Called Hatter Fox (TV) as Dr. Teague Summer
- 1977 Our Town (TV film) as Charles Webb
- 1978 Gray Lady Down as Commander David Samuelson
- 1978 Fantasy Island (TV) episode "Reunion" / "Anniversary" as Tom Elgin
- 1978 Harper Valley PTA as Willis Newton
- 1979 The Onion Field as Sergeant Pierce R. Brooks
- 1980 The Courage of Kavik the Wolf Dog as Kurt Evans
- 1980 Alcatraz: The Whole Shocking Story (TV) as Bernard Coy
- 1981 Taps as Colonel Kerby
- 1981 Fallen Angel (TV film) as Frank Dawson
- 1982 The Beast Within as Eli MacCleary
- 1982 Tangiers as Bob Steele
- 1982 Two of a Kind as Ted Hahn
- 1982 Some Kind of Hero as Colonel Powers
- 1984 The Jesse Owens Story (TV) as Coach Larry Snyder
- 1984 Beverly Hills Cop as Lieutenant Andrew Bogomil
- 1984 Raw Courage (also writer and producer) as Pete Canfield
- 1984–1985 Spencer as George Winger
- 1985 Vision Quest as Larry Swain
- 1986 Hollywood Vice Squad as Captain Jensen
- 1987 Steele Justice as Bennett
- 1987 Beverly Hills Cop II as Captain / Chief Andrew Bogomil
- 1987 RoboCop as Richard "Dick" Jones
- 1987–1988 St. Elsewhere as Dr. John Gideon
- 1987 Amazon Women on the Moon as General Balentine (segment "The Unknown Soldier") (uncredited)
- 1988 In the Line of Duty: The F.B.I. Murders as FBI Special Agent Ben Grogan
- 1989 One Man Force as McCoy
- 1989 Martians Go Home as The President
- 1990 Loose Cannons as Bob Smiley
- 1990 Total Recall as Vilos Cohaagen
- 1990 Captain America as President Tom Kimball
- 1990 Cop Rock as Chief Roger Kendrick
- 1991 Scissors as Dr. Stephan Carter
- 1992 Star Trek: The Next Generation (two episodes) as Captain Edward Jellico
- 1992 Perry Mason: The Case of the Heartbroken Bride as Mr. Parrish
- 1993 L.A. Law as Mason Paine
- 1997 Murder at 1600 as President Jack Neil
- 1998–2005 Stargate SG-1 (11 episodes) as Senator Robert Kinsey / Vice President Robert Kinsey
- 1998 Puraido: Unmei no Toki as Chief Justice Sir William Webb
- 1998 Frog and Wombat as Principal Larry Struble
- 1999 Forces of Nature as Hadley
- 1999 The Outer Limits, episode "Deja Vu" as Lieutenant Colonel Lester Glade
- 1999 Deep Blue Sea as Franklin's Boss (uncredited)
- 1999 FreeSpace 2 as Admiral Aken Bosch (voice)
- 2000 Perfect Murder, Perfect Town as John Ramsey
- 2001 The Agency (2001) as Director Alex Pierce III
- 2001 The Boys of Sunset Ridge as Ben Thorpe
- 2001 American Outlaws as Doc Mimms, Zee's Dad
- 2001 Losing Grace as Dave Reed
- 2002 Crazy As Hell as Delazo
- 2004 Killzone (Video Game) as Stuart Adams (voice)
- 2004 Angel in the Family as Buddy
- 2005 Law & Order: Special Victims Unit as Dr. McManus
- 2005 The L.A. Riot Spectacular as The Chief
- 2006 Desperate Housewives (TV Series) as Henry Mason
- 2006 Commander in Chief as Senator Joe Peck
- 2007 Tell Me You Love Me as John
- 2008 Cold Case as Daniel Patterson '08
- 2009 Imagine That as Tom Stevens
- 2011 Dexter as Walter Kenney
- 2012 Leverage as Peter McSweeten
- 2013 Age of Dinosaurs as Justin
- 2014 Beyond the Reach as Sheriff Robb
- 2018 Nashville as Gideon Claybourne
- 2019 The Car: Road to Revenge as The Mechanic
- 2021 Being the Ricardos as Older Bob Carroll
- 2022–2024 Star Trek: Prodigy as Admiral Edward Jellico (voice)
- 2023 RoboDoc: The Creation of RoboCop as himself

== Discography ==
Year	Title
2020	Ronny Cox – Live at the Kitchen Sink
2014	Ronny Cox Live in Concert – The Official Bootleg
2012	Ronny, Rad and Karen
2009	Songs... with Repercussions
2008	How I Love Them Old Songs...
2006	Ronny Cox at the Sebastiani Theatre
2006	Ronny Cox: Songs, Stories... and Out & Out Lies (DVD)
2004	Ronny Cox Live
2002	Cowboy Savant
2000	Acoustic Eclectricity
1993	Ronny Cox

== Books ==
- Cox, Ronny. Dueling Banjos: The Deliverance of Drew. Decent Hill, 2012. ISBN 978-1-936085-58-3 (paperback); 9781936085590 (hardcover); 9781936085606 (eBook)
