= Werner Spitz =

German forensic pathologist (1926–2024)

- Born: August 22, 1926; Stargard in Pommern, Pomerania, Prussia, Germany
- Died: April 14, 2024 (aged 97); St. Clair Shores, Michigan, U.S.
- Education: Hebrew University of Jerusalem
- Occupation: Forensic pathologist
- Years active: 1953–2024
- Children: 3

Werner Uri Spitz (August 22, 1926 – April 14, 2024) was a German-American forensic pathologist who worked on a number of high-profile cases, including the investigations of the assassinations of President John F. Kennedy and Reverend Martin Luther King Jr. He also testified at the trials of Casey Anthony and Phil Spector, the 1996 civil trial against O. J. Simpson, and consulted on the investigation of JonBenét Ramsey's 1996 death.

Spitz wrote and with his son Daniel co-edited the book Spitz and Fisher's Medicolegal Investigation of Death: Guidelines for the Application of Pathology to Crime Investigation.

== Biography ==
Werner Spitz was born in 1926 to a Jewish family in Stargard (now Poland); his parents, Siegfried and Anna Spitz, were both physicians. Given the growing antisemitism in Germany, his family fled to Mandatory Palestine when he was a child. When Spitz was a youth, his father got him a job working in a medical examiner's office, where he was charged with cleaning and other small duties. Spitz eventually began assisting with autopsies, and he later recalled assisting with the autopsy of Morris Meyerson, the husband of future Israeli politician and Prime Minister Golda Meir.

Spitz returned to Europe for medical school, where he started studies at Geneva University in Switzerland. After he had spent four years in Geneva, the Hebrew University in Jerusalem established its Medical School and Spitz transferred there. He received his medical doctorate after an additional three years of studies and clinical work. He graduated at the age of 27.

Spitz immigrated to the United States in 1959. His decision to leave Israel was partly inspired by the lack of regional need for his chosen career path. "In seven years in Israel, there was only one murder." He said. "It just wasn't the right place for a forensic pathologist." Spitz later served as Deputy Chief Medical Examiner in Baltimore, Maryland, and Chief Medical Examiner for Wayne County, Michigan (Wayne County includes the city of Detroit).

In Wayne County, he made many controversial changes, and in 1976, he was charged with taking parts from bodies without getting permission from the next of kin, privately charging for his services, and improperly conducting ballistic experiments on dead bodies. Although Spitz admitted some of the charges, the Wayne County Prosecutor declined to prosecute him, saying that "He was just being a doctor."

== Work as a forensic pathologist ==
In 1969, Spitz testified on behalf of Joseph and Gwen Kopechne, the parents of Mary Jo Kopechne, who died following a car accident in the vehicle of Ted Kennedy at Chappaquiddick Island. Kopechne was presumed to have died from drowning after Kennedy's car swerved off a small bridge and plunged into the water. Kopechne's parents were seeking to prevent her body from being exhumed and autopsied. Spitz testified that the autopsy was unnecessary, and the available evidence was sufficient to conclude that Kopechne died from drowning. The judge sided with Kopechne's parents and denied the request for exhumation.

In 1970, while Spitz was the deputy chief medical examiner for Maryland, he determined that Sister Cathy Cesnik, a 26-year-old Catholic nun who disappeared in November 1969, had been murdered by a blow to the head. In 1994, a witness came forward and said a priest took her as a young teen, to see Cesnik's body shortly after she had gone missing. She said that he was threatening her not to say anything about the sexual abuse that was allegedly occurring at her Catholic school. The witness told police she remembered maggots on Cesnik's corpse, but was not believed. The police said that maggots were unlikely in November. However, in 2016, when Spitz's original autopsy was made public, it had documented that there were maggots present. Werner confirmed this when interviewed for the 2017 Netflix series The Keepers, about Cesnik's murder.

In 1975, Spitz was asked to work as an advisor to both the Rockefeller Commission and the House Select Committee on Assassinations. He reviewed the autopsy performed 12 years earlier on president John F. Kennedy by military pathologists. "They botched that autopsy," Spitz said. "They had absolutely no experience in forensic pathology." He attributed the flaws in the investigation to the fact that at that time in the United States, forensic pathology was in its infancy. Despite his conclusion that the original investigation was flawed, he agreed with the Warren Commission's conclusion that Lee Harvey Oswald acted alone in the shooting.

In 1979, Spitz consulted with the same committees on the assassination of Martin Luther King Jr. in 1968. The committee determined that King was killed by one rifle shot by James Earl Ray.

In 2011, Spitz testified for the defense in the trial of Casey Anthony for the death of her daughter, Caylee. He disagreed with the prosecution's medical examiner Jan Garavaglia, who had said that the death could be ruled as a homicide based on the autopsy, and described her work as "shoddy". Garavaglia acknowledged that the cause of death could not be ascertained by the autopsy she performed, but ruled the death a homicide based on the circumstances. Spitz criticized her for failing to open the skull and test sediment found in the skull; he believed that was proof that Caylee had decomposed while lying on her side, rather than the position in which she was found. He disagreed with the state's theory that duct tape found next to Caylee's body was used as a murder weapon, saying it was much more likely that the duct tape was placed after her death to hold the mandible in place when moving the body. He also believes that the placement of Caylee's hair was staged by someone before being photographed.

In a CBS Detroit interview in September 2016 and in the documentary series The Case of: JonBenét Ramsey (2016), Spitz accused Burke Ramsey of killing his sister, although the pathologist had not performed an autopsy of the girl. On October 6, 2016, Burke filed a defamation lawsuit against Spitz, seeking a total of $150 million in damages since Burke had never been considered a suspect by the Boulder police. In 2003, DNA evidence found from an unidentified male appeared to have cleared each family member from suspicion, as their DNA was excluded from matching. New testing in 2016 revealed there was DNA from two persons other than JonBenét Ramsey.

Spitz was a professor of pathology at Wayne State University School of Medicine in Detroit, Michigan and an adjunct professor of pathology at the University of Windsor in Canada. He wrote a book entitled: Spitz and Fisher's Medicolegal Investigation of Death: Guidelines for the Application of Pathology to Crime Investigation.

== List of notable cases ==
- Assassination of John F. Kennedy
- Assassination of Martin Luther King Jr.
- Florence Ballard
- Death of Lisa McPherson
- Richard Ramirez
- "Preppy Murder Trial" of Robert Chambers
- O. J. Simpson's civil trial
- Killing of JonBenét Ramsey
- Killing of Caylee Anthony
- Lana Clarkson's death at the hands of Phil Spector
- Mary Jo Kopechne
- Murder of Sister Cathy Cesnik
- Murder of Renisha McBride
- Rodney Reed
- Killing of Antonio Zambrano-Montes
- Killing of Patrick Lyoya

== Personal life and death ==
Spitz was the father of Daniel Spitz, who is also a pathologist, Jonathan Spitz, a surgeon, and Rhona Spitz, a lawyer. He had a sister, Karni Frank, who also lived in Michigan until her death in 2020.

Werner Spitz died in St. Clair Shores, Michigan, on April 14, 2024, at the age of 97.
