= Getting Away with Murder: The JonBenet Ramsey Story =

2000 television documentary film

- Genre: Documentary
- Written by: Michael A. Graham; Ted Haimes
- Directed by: Edward Lucas
- Country of origin: United States
- Original language: English

Production
- Executive producers: Chris Cowan; Jean-Michel Michenaud
- Producers: Ted Haimes; Michael Shevloff
- Running time: 44–45 minutes
- Production company: Rocket Science Laboratories

Original release
- Network: Fox
- Release: February 16, 2000

Getting Away with Murder: The JonBenet Ramsey Story is an American docudrama broadcast by the Fox Broadcasting Company (Fox). The one-hour film premiered on February 16, 2000, and it was produced by the American television production company Rocket Science Laboratories. Directed by Edward Lucas, the film is based on the 1996 killing of JonBenét Ramsey. The film starred Julia Granstrom as JonBenét Ramsey.

== Plot ==
On December 25, 1996, in Boulder, Colorado, an asleep JonBenét Ramsey (Julia Granstrom) is carried by her parents, John (Cliff DeYoung) and Patsy Ramsey (Judi Evans Luciano), into their residence after attending a Christmas party. The family admires their Christmas tree, as the film intercuts with scenes of JonBenét's autopsy. Before JonBenét is put to bed, John leads her in the Christian child's prayer "Now I Lay Me Down to Sleep". The following morning, Patsy finds a ransom note on the kitchen staircase. The note demands $118,000 in exchange for the return of JonBenét; it further claims that JonBenét will be executed if John and Patsy refuse to pay the ransom. Investigators arrive to the Ramsey residence and question John and Patsy in an effort to determine who wrote the ransom note. The residence is then thoroughly searched by the investigators, who discover JonBenét's corpse in the basement. The investigators call for an ambulance, as they remove duct tape from JonBenét's mouth and a cord that is tied around her wrists. As JonBenét's body is brought upstairs, John and Patsy become hysterical. A reverend leads the couple in prayer in an effort to calm them down.

Assigned to write a story about JonBenét's death, a reporter (Alice Barrett-Mitchell) travels to Boulder. Upon arrival to the city, she interviews the Ramsey's friends and neighbors, in addition to city officials. As she watches a televised interview with John and Patsy, the reporter begins to grow suspicious of the couple. She receives a call from a detective (Brad Greenquist) who claims that he wants her to know the truth about JonBenét's death. The detective, however, has second thoughts and ends the call. As investigators begin to consider John and Patsy as suspects, the reporter receives a second call from the detective. The detective claims that John and Patsy murdered JonBenét, however, he asks the reporter to not run the story over concerns that it will be traced back to him. As news coverage of the killing increases, the reporter receives a call from another detective (Albert Hall). This detective claims that John and Patsy are innocent, and that the Boulder Police Department are attempting to frame the couple. He alleges that JonBenét was actually killed by Bill McReynolds, Randy Simons, or Jeff Merrick, all of whom have connections with the Ramsey family. Confused over who was actually responsible for JonBenét's death, the reporter ultimately writes that the truth will only be discovered within time.

== Production ==
The documentary film centered on the 1996 killing of JonBenét Ramsey, a six-year-old child beauty queen. The film, which was produced by Rocket Science Laboratories, suggested that Ramsey's parents were responsible for her death.

== Cast ==
- Alice Barrett-Mitchell as Reporter
- Cliff DeYoung as John Ramsey
- Julia Granstrom as JonBenét Ramsey
- Brad Greenquist as Detective Guilty
- Albert Hall as Investigator Innocent
- Judi Evans Luciano as Patsy Ramsey

== Reception ==
Caryn James of The New York Times claimed the film was "tacky", and she criticized Judi Evans Luciano's portrayal of Patsy Ramsey.

== See also ==
- Perfect Murder, Perfect Town
