= Killing of JonBenét Ramsey =

1996 unsolved murder in Boulder, Colorado, US

JonBenét Ramsey
- Ramsey in June 1996
- Born: JonBenét Patricia Ramsey; August 6, 1990; Atlanta, Georgia, U.S.
- Died: c. December 26, 1996 (aged 6); Boulder, Colorado, U.S.
- Cause of death: Asphyxia by strangulation Craniocerebral trauma
- Resting place: St. James Episcopal Cemetery, Marietta, Georgia, U.S. 33.95501°N 84.55637°W
- Height: 3 ft 11 in (119 cm)
- Parents: John Bennett Ramsey (father); Patsy Ramsey (mother)

Late on the night of December 25 or during the early morning hours of December 26, 1996, six‑year‑old JonBenét Patricia Ramsey was murdered in her family's home at 755 15th Street in Boulder, Colorado. (Note: The house has since been renumbered 749 15th Street.) She was reported missing early on December 26, and her body was found about seven hours later in the basement of the house. Her skull had an 8.5 inch fracture on the right side of her head, and a garrote was tied around her neck. The autopsy determined that the cause of death was asphyxia by strangulation associated with craniocerebral trauma, and the case was ruled a homicide.

The Boulder Police Department initially focused on the Ramsey family, particularly a handwritten ransom note found in the house, which investigators believed had been written by JonBenét's mother, Patsy Ramsey. Police theorized that the note and the condition of JonBenét's body had been staged by Patsy and her husband, John Bennett Ramsey, to conceal responsibility for the killing. In 1999, both the police and the district attorney stated that JonBenét's nine‑year‑old brother, Burke, was not a suspect. That same year, a grand jury voted to indict the Ramseys for child abuse resulting in death and for accessory to a crime. Then-district attorney Alex Hunter declined to sign the indictment, saying there was insufficient evidence to prove the charges at trial.

In 2002, a new district attorney, Mary Lacy, assumed control of the case and advanced the theory that an intruder had entered the home and committed the killing. In 2003, trace DNA recovered from JonBenét's clothing was found to belong to an unidentified male, and the Ramseys were excluded as contributors. In 2008, Lacy sent the family a letter stating that they were cleared by the DNA results. Subsequent district attorney Stan Garnett would say, in 2016, that Lacy's decision was not legally binding, and that Lacy never should have written the letter. In 2009, the Boulder Police Department resumed control of the investigation and continues to treat the case as an open homicide.

The killing drew extensive national and international media attention, fueled by JonBenét's participation in child beauty pageants, the family's wealth, and the unusual evidence associated with the case. Media coverage scrutinized the police response, advanced competing theories, and prompted multiple defamation suits by Ramsey family members and associates. The case remains unsolved, and the Boulder Police Department provides periodic public updates.

== Life and murder ==
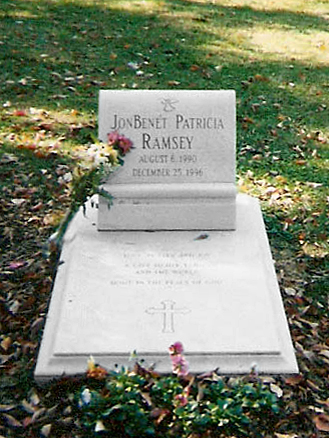
JonBenét's grave at St. James Episcopal Cemetery in Marietta, Georgia

JonBenét Patricia Ramsey was born on August 6, 1990, in Atlanta, Georgia, the younger of two children of Patricia "Patsy" Ramsey (1956–2006) and John Bennett Ramsey (born 1943). She had an older brother, Burke (born 1987), and three older half-siblings from her father's first marriage.

Her given name was created by combining her father's first and middle names, while her mother's first name was used as her middle name. During the 1996-97 school year, she was enrolled in kindergarten at High Peaks Elementary School in Boulder, Colorado.

On December 26, 1996, JonBenét's body was discovered in the basement of her family's Boulder home. She was buried on December 31, at St. James Episcopal Cemetery in Marietta, Georgia, where she was interred beside her half-sister Elizabeth Pasch Ramsey, who had died in a car crash nearly five years earlier at age 22.

== Parents ==
John Ramsey is a businessman who was the president of Access Graphics, a computer company that later became a subsidiary of Lockheed Martin. His first marriage ended in divorce in 1978. In 1991, John had moved with Patsy, his second wife, and family to Boulder, where Access Graphics' headquarters was located.

Patsy Ramsey entered JonBenét in various child beauty pageants, where she won the titles of America's Royale Miss, Little Miss Charlevoix, Little Miss Colorado, Colorado State All-Star Kids Cover Girl, and National Tiny Miss Beauty. JonBenét's active role in child beauty pageants and Patsy's reported "pageant mother" behavior were reported by the media after the murder.

Six months after JonBenét's death, the Ramseys moved to a new home in Atlanta after a summer at their vacation retreat in Charlevoix, Michigan. Patsy died of ovarian cancer at age 49 in 2006. She is interred next to her daughter.

== Evidence ==
=== 911 call and initial search for the child ===
The only people known to be in the house on the night of JonBenét's death were her immediate family: Patsy and John Ramsey and their son Burke. The ransom note contained specific instructions against contacting police and friends, but Patsy telephoned the police at 5:52 a.m. MST. She also called family and friends. Two police officers responded to the 9-1-1 call and arrived at the Ramsey home within three minutes. They conducted a cursory search of the house but did not find any sign of forced entry. (Note: It was later determined that some windows and a door had been left unlocked that night. In addition, a basement window was previously broken by John Ramsey when he was locked out of the house. Lou Smit, a retired homicide detective, was brought in to investigate the case. He quickly became a proponent of the theory that an intruder had been behind the killing, believing that the intruder entered through a window in the basement of the Ramsey residence. A suitcase was found on the floor almost directly underneath this window. Smit theorized the attacker(s) planned to use this suitcase either to take JonBenét alive as a kidnap victim or move her body out of the house, but this proved impossible.)

Officer Rick French went to the basement and came to a door that was secured by an additional wooden latch at the top of the door frame. He paused for a moment in front of the door, but walked away without opening it. French later explained that he was looking for an exit route used by the kidnapper; since the wooden latch was holding the door closed from inside the house, the kidnapper could not have used this door and then closed the latch from the inside, ruling this out as a possible exit. JonBenét's body was later found behind the door.

With JonBenét still missing, John made arrangements to pay the ransom. A forensics team was dispatched to the house. The team initially believed that the child had been kidnapped, and JonBenét's bedroom was the only room in the house that was cordoned off to prevent contamination of evidence. No precautions were taken to prevent contamination of evidence in the rest of the house. Meanwhile, friends, victim advocates, and the Ramsey family's minister arrived at the home to show support. Visitors tidied up and cleaned surfaces in the kitchen, possibly destroying evidence. Boulder detective Linda Arndt arrived at about 8:00 a.m. MST, in anticipation of receiving further instructions by the kidnapper(s), but there was never an attempt by anyone to claim the money.

=== Discovery of the body ===
At 1:00 p.m. MST, Detective Arndt asked John Ramsey and Fleet White, a family friend, to search the house to see if "anything seemed amiss." They started their search in the basement. John opened the latched door which Officer French had overlooked; his daughter's body lay in one of the rooms. JonBenét's mouth was covered with duct tape, a nylon cord was found around her wrists and neck, and her torso was covered by a white blanket. John picked up her body and rushed upstairs. When JonBenét was moved, the crime scene was further contaminated, and critical forensic evidence was disturbed for the returning forensics team. (Note: Former FBI profiler John E. Douglas, who was brought in to assist the Ramseys' lawyers on the case in January 1997 to assess whether the Ramseys were involved, stated that if a family member was involved in a murder, they would generally construe events so that another person found the body. In this case, John found the body and his friend followed him into the basement room. According to Douglas, when a family member is involved in a murder, they are likely to cover their child's body in a protective manner, covering all but their head. In this case, just the torso was covered, which did not denote the kind of act a parent would generally perform. In addition, John removed the duct tape from her mouth and loosened the cord around her, which goes against the theory of "staging" the body. Arndt made an error when she moved JonBenét into the living room.)

Each of the Ramseys provided handwriting, blood, and hair samples to the police. John and Patsy participated in a preliminary interview for more than two hours, and Burke was also interviewed within the first couple of weeks following JonBenét's death.

=== Witness statements ===
Scott Gibbons, a neighbor, claimed that around midnight, while looking from his kitchen window, he saw the upper kitchen of the Ramsey residence lit up with dimmed lights. Neighbor Melody Stanton reported that she awoke shortly after midnight to the sound of a child's scream coming from the Ramsey residence.

=== Ransom note ===
Patsy Ramsey reported that she found a two-and-a-half-page handwritten ransom note on their kitchen staircase. The note demanded US$118,000 for JonBenét's return. John pointed out to the first police on the scene that the amount was nearly identical to his Christmas bonus of the prior year, which suggested that someone who would have access to that information would be involved in the crime. Investigators looked at several theories behind the dollar amount demanded, considering employees at Access Graphics who might have known the amount of John's prior bonus. They also considered the possibility that the ransom demand was a reference to Psalm 118 and spoke to religious sources to determine possible relevance.

The ransom note appears to echo film dialogue. The films Ruthless People, Ransom, Escape from New York, Speed and Dirty Harry are considered to be potential sources.

The ransom note was unusually long. The Federal Bureau of Investigation (FBI) told the police that it was very unusual for such a note to be written at the crime scene. The police believed that the note was staged, because it did not have any fingerprints except for Patsy's and authorities who had handled it, and because it included an unusual use of exclamation marks and initialisms. The note and a practice draft were written with a pen and notepad from the Ramsey home.

According to a Colorado Bureau of Investigation (CBI) report, there were "indications that the author of the ransom note is Patricia Ramsey." However, the evidence fell short of a definitive conclusion. Michael Baden, a board-certified forensic pathologist, who had consulted with both sides of the case, said he had never seen a note like it in his 60-year experience and that he did not think it was written by an outside stranger.

A federal court ruled it highly unlikely that Patsy wrote the note, citing six certified handwriting experts. The court lamented the self-proclaimed experts—without credentials—interfering in the case by accusing Patsy with no scientific basis.

Text of the ransom note

Mr. Ramsey,

Listen carefully! We are a group of individuals that represent a small foreign faction. We ~~do~~ respect your bussiness [sic] but not the country that it serves. At this time we have your daughter in our posession [sic]. She is safe and unharmed and if you want her to see 1997, you must follow our instructions to the letter.

You will withdraw $118,000.00 from your account. $100,000 will be in $100 bills and the remaining $18,000 in $20 bills. Make sure that you bring an adequate size attache to the bank. When you get home you will put the money in a brown paper bag. I will call you between 8 and 10 am tomorrow to instruct you on delivery. The delivery will be exhausting so I advise you to be rested. If we monitor you getting the money early, we might call you early to arrange an earlier delivery of the money and hence a [sic] earlier ~~delivery~~ pick-up of your daughter.

Any deviation of my instructions will result in the immediate execution of your daughter. You will also be denied her remains for proper burial. The two gentlemen watching over your daughter do ^{not} particularly like you so I advise you not to provoke them. Speaking to anyone about your situation, such as Police, F.B.I., etc., will result in your daughter being beheaded. If we catch you talking to a stray dog, she dies. If you alert bank authorities, she dies. If the money is in any way marked or tampered with, she dies. You will be scanned for electronic devices and if any are found, she dies. You can try to deceive us but be warned that we are familiar with law enforcement countermeasures and tactics. You stand a 99% chance of killing your daughter if you try to out smart [sic] us. Follow our instructions and you stand a 100% chance of getting her back.

You and your family are under constant scrutiny as well as the authorities. Don't try to grow a brain John. You are not the only fat cat around so don't think that killing will be difficult. Don't underestimate us John. Use that good southern common sense of yours. It is up to you now John!

Victory!

S.B.T.C

=== Autopsy ===
The autopsy revealed that JonBenét was killed by strangulation and a skull fracture. The official cause of death was "asphyxia by strangulation associated with craniocerebral trauma." There was no evidence of conventional rape, although sexual assault could not be ruled out. Although no semen was found, there was evidence that there had been a vaginal injury. Evidence also suggested that the paintbrush used in the garrote was also used for sexual assault. At the time of the autopsy, the pathologist recorded that it appeared her vaginal area had been wiped with a cloth. Her death was ruled a homicide.

A garrote that was made from a length of nylon cord and the broken handle of a paintbrush was tied around JonBenét's neck and had apparently been used to strangle her. Part of the bristle end of the paintbrush was found in a tub containing Patsy's art supplies, but the bottom third of it was never found despite extensive searching of the house by the police in subsequent days.

The autopsy revealed a "vegetable or fruit material which may represent pineapple," which JonBenét had eaten a few hours before her death. Photographs of the home taken on the day when JonBenét's body was found show a bowl of pineapple on the kitchen table with a spoon in it. However, neither John nor Patsy said they remembered putting the bowl on the table or feeding pineapple to JonBenét. Police reported that they found Patsy Ramsey's fingerprints on the bowl.

=== Blood samples ===
In December 2003, forensic investigators extracted enough material from a mixed blood sample found on JonBenét's underwear to establish a DNA profile. That DNA belonged to an unknown male person, and excluded the DNA of each of the Ramseys. The DNA was submitted to the FBI's Combined DNA Index System (CODIS), a database containing more than 1.6 million DNA profiles, but the sample did not match any profile in the database. In October 2016, a report said that new forensic analysis with more sensitive techniques revealed that the original DNA contained genetic markers from two individuals other than JonBenét.

A. James Kolar, who was a lead investigator for the DA's office, said that there were additional traces of male DNA found on the cord and paintbrush that Boulder district attorney Mary Lacy did not mention, and that there were six separate DNA samples belonging to unknown individuals that were found by the test. Former FBI profiler Candice Delong believes that the DNA, having shown up identically in several different places on multiple surfaces, belongs to the killer.

Former Adams County, Colorado, District Attorney Bob Grant, who has assisted the Boulder DA's office on the case for many years, also believes that the DNA evidence is significant, saying that any resolution of the case would have to explain how the DNA showed up on several pieces of JonBenét's clothing. Forensic pathologist Michael Baden said, "Trace amounts of DNA can get on places and clothing from all different, nonsuspicious means. There is no forensic evidence to show that this is a stranger murder."

== Investigation ==
Experts, media commentators, and the Ramseys have identified potential suspects in the case. Boulder police initially focused almost exclusively upon John and Patsy, but by October 1997 had more than 1,600 people in their index of persons of interest for the case.

Errors that were made in the initial investigation complicated the resolution of the investigation and applicable theory. Those errors included loss and contamination of evidence, lack of experienced and technical staff on the investigation, evidence shared with the Ramseys, and delayed informal interviews with the parents. (Note: A Boulder defense attorney, Lee Hill, commented that: "The public feels that the police have coddled the Ramseys because they are rich and influential in Boulder.") Other issues include misleading information intentionally leaked by Boulder Police in hopes of creating public pressure on John and Patsy Ramsey to better cooperate with police interview requests, which contributed to the intense media attention surrounding the family.

Lou Smit was a detective who came out of retirement in early 1997 to assist the Boulder County District Attorney's office with the case. In May 1998, he presented his findings to the Boulder police with other staff members of the DA's Office, concluding that the evidence pointed away from the Ramseys. They were unable to successfully challenge the police department's belief that the Ramseys were guilty. The DA's office sought to take control of the investigation. Due to the animosity between the police and the DA's office, and the pressure to obtain a conviction, Colorado governor Roy Romer interceded and named Michael Kane as special prosecutor to initiate a grand jury.

Two of the lead investigators in the case had opposing views. Both Lou Smit and Steve Thomas ultimately resigned—Smit because he believed that the investigation had incompetently overlooked the intruder hypothesis, and Thomas because he believed the DA's office had interfered with and failed to support his hypothesis of the case.

A grand jury was convened beginning September 15, 1998, to consider indicting the Ramseys for charges relating to the case. In 1999, the grand jury returned a true bill to charge the Ramseys with placing the child at risk in a way that led to her death, based on the probable cause standard applied in such grand jury proceedings. Boulder County District Attorney Alex Hunter did not prosecute them, because he did not believe that he could meet the higher standard of proving guilt beyond a reasonable doubt that is required for a criminal conviction.

Mary Lacy, the next Boulder County District Attorney, took over the investigation from the police on December 26, 2002. In April 2003, she agreed with a federal judge who sat on a 2002 libel case that evidence in the suit is "more consistent with a theory that an intruder murdered JonBenét than it was with a theory that Mrs. Ramsey did". On July 9, 2008, the Boulder District Attorney's office announced that, as a result of newly developed DNA sampling and testing techniques (touch DNA analysis), the Ramsey family members were excluded as suspects in the case. Lacy publicly exonerated the Ramseys.

On February 2, 2009, Boulder police chief Mark Beckner announced that Stan Garnett, the new Boulder County District Attorney, was turning the case over to his agency, and that his team would resume investigating it. Garnett found that the statute of limitations for the crimes identified in the 1999 grand jury true bill had expired, and did not pursue review of the case against the Ramseys.

In October 2010, the Boulder police reopened the cold case. New interviews were conducted following a fresh inquiry by a committee that included state and federal investigators. Police were expected to use the latest DNA technology in their investigation. There was no new information gleaned from those interviews. It was reported in September 2016 that the investigation into JonBenét's death continues to be an active homicide case, per Boulder Police Chief Greg Testa. (Note: Boulder Police Chief Greg Testa stated in September 2016 that "To date, the Boulder Police Department has processed more than 1,500 pieces of evidence, including the analysis of over 200 DNA samples. [...] Our major crimes unit has received and reviewed or investigated over 20,000 tips, letters or emails. Our detectives have traveled to over 18 states and interviewed or spoken with more than 1,000 individuals.")

In 2015, Beckner disagreed with exonerating the Ramseys, stating, "Exonerating anyone based on a small piece of evidence that has not yet been proved to even be connected to the crime is absurd." He also stated that the unknown DNA from JonBenét's clothing "has got to be the focus of the investigation" at this point in time and that, until one can prove otherwise, "the suspect is the donator of that unknown DNA."

In 2016, Gordon Coombes, a former investigator for the Boulder County District Attorney's office, also questioned total absolution of the Ramseys, stating, "We all shed DNA all the time within our skin cells. It can be deposited anywhere at any time for various reasons, reasons that are benign. To clear somebody just on the premise of touch DNA, especially when you have a situation where the crime scene wasn't secure at the beginning ... really is a stretch." Steven E. Pitt, a forensic psychiatrist hired by Boulder authorities, said, "Lacy's public exoneration of the Ramseys was a big slap in the face to Chief Beckner and the core group of detectives who had been working on the case for years."

== Theories and suspects ==
There are two primary theories about JonBenét's death. In the family-member theory, JonBenét was killed by one or more family members. In the intruder theory, an intruder committed the crime.

=== Family-member theory ===
Boulder police initially concentrated almost exclusively upon JonBenét's parents. According to Gregg McCrary, a retired FBI profiler, "statistically, it is a 12-to-1 probability that it's a family member or a care giver" who is involved in the homicide of a child. The police saw no evidence of a forced entry, but they did see evidence of staging of the scene, such as the ransom note. They did not find the Ramseys cooperative in helping solve the case. (Note: James Brooke of The New York Times reported, "The Ramseys have consistently maintained their innocence. But for four months after the murder, they declined to talk to the police. Instead, they mounted a defense team that sounds like a defense lawyer's Christmas carol: eight lawyers, four publicists, three private investigators, two handwriting analysts and one retired F.B.I. profiler.") The Ramseys had said that their reluctance was due to their fear that there would not be a full investigation for intruders, and that they would be hastily selected as the key suspects in the case, according to the Daily Camera.

John Edward Douglas, a former FBI special agent and a criminal profiler, contends that John and Patsy Ramsey did not kill their daughter. He was critical of the way the media and the public viewed the case: "Many crimes are tried in the court of public opinion long before they reach a court of law. But I know of no other case in which the majority of people have decided the solution based on statistics. I know of no other case in which the public substantially believes what has been reported in the tabloids. I know of no other case in which the mainline media have let the tabloids take the lead and then reported on their reporting. And I know of no other case in which largely respectable television programs have so tried to outdo each other in sensationalism."

One theory is that Patsy struck JonBenét in a fit of rage after a bedwetting episode, and strangled her to cover up what had happened after mistakenly thinking she was already dead. JonBenét's brother Burke Ramsey later said, "We didn't get spanked, nothing of the sort, nothing close, nothing near laying a finger on us, let alone killing your child."

Theoretically, the strangulation could have been a red herring to conceal other elements of the assault and killing.

Burke, who was nine years old at the time of JonBenét's death, was interviewed by investigators at least three times. The interviews did not raise any concerns. A review by a child psychologist stated that it appeared that the Ramseys had "healthy, caring family relationships". In 1998, Boulder Police Chief Mark Beckner said during an interview with a news reporter that Burke was not involved in the killing of his sister. In May 1999, the Boulder County District Attorney's office reiterated that Burke was not a suspect. The investigators had never considered him a suspect.

The Ramseys offered a $100,000 reward in a newspaper ad dated April 27, 1997. Three days later, more than four months after the body of their daughter was found, they submitted for the first time to separate formal interviews at the Boulder County Justice Center.

In 1999, Colorado Governor Bill Owens spoke out, telling the Ramsey couple to "quit hiding behind their attorneys, quit hiding behind their PR firm".

A Colorado grand jury voted in 1999 to indict the parents. (Note: Burke testified at a 1999 grand jury hearing. Burke's attorney, Jim Jenkins, sought to prevent his testifying at the grand jury and to eliminate him as a suspect, but the DA's office said that Burke was not and never had been a suspect.) The indictment cited "two counts each of child abuse" and said the parents "did unlawfully, knowingly, recklessly and feloniously permit a child to be unreasonably placed in a situation that posed a threat of injury to the child's life or health, which resulted in the death of JonBenét Ramsey, a child under the age of sixteen."

Among the experts who testified in the case were DNA specialist Barry Scheck and forensic expert Henry Lee. On October 13, 1999, district attorney Alex Hunter refused to sign the indictment, saying that the evidence was insufficient for prosecution. The public thought that the grand jury investigation had been inconclusive. In 2002, the statute of limitations on the grand jury's charges expired.

The grand jury's vote to indict was not revealed publicly until October 25, 2013, when previously sealed court documents were released. (Note: In September 2013, Daily Camera reporter Charlie Brennan and the Reporters Committee for Freedom of the Press filed a lawsuit to press DA Stan Garnett to release the grand jury's indictment. The police sought to interview Burke Ramsey again in September 2010, according to L. Lin Wood, a high-profile libel (defamation) attorney whom the Ramsey family hired in 1999. In 2012, the book Foreign Faction – Who Really Kidnapped JonBenet? by A. James Kolar, a former investigator under Boulder County District Attorney Lacy, was published. The book discounts the intruder theory and proposes scenarios of Ramsey family involvement in JonBenét's death. In mid-October 2013, a judge ruled that the DA must show why the indictment should remain sealed. The Denver Post (a sister paper of the Daily Camera) published an editorial calling for the indictment to be unsealed.)

The Case of: JonBenét Ramsey, a show broadcast on CBS on September 18 and 19, 2016, used a group of experts to evaluate the evidence. The group theorized that Burke hit his sister in the head with a heavy object (possibly a flashlight) after she stole a piece of pineapple from his bowl, perhaps not intending to kill her. They suggested that the ransom letter was an attempt to cover up the circumstances of JonBenét's death. On behalf of Burke Ramsey, his counsel filed defamation lawsuits against CBS, the producers of the program, and several of its participants, based on many of its claims.

=== Intruder theory ===
The police and the prosecutors followed leads for intruders partly due to the unidentified boot mark left in the basement room where JonBenét's body was found.

Early persons of interest included neighbor Bill McReynolds; Chris Wolf, a local reporter whose then-girlfriend reported him as a suspect; family housekeeper Linda Hoffmann-Pugh; and a man named Michael Helgoth, who died in an apparent suicide shortly after JonBenét's death. Hundreds of DNA tests were performed to find a match to the DNA recovered during her autopsy. In a 2003 defamation lawsuit related to the case (Wolf v. Ramsey), involving the Ramseys publicly identifying an early suspect in the case, Judge Julie E. Carnes wrote:

[T]here is virtually no evidence to support [Wolf's] theory that [the Ramseys] murdered their child, but abundant evidence to support their belief that an intruder entered their home at some point during the night of December 25, 1996, and killed their daughter.

Lou Smit, a detective in the case, assessed the evidence and concluded that an intruder had committed the crime. On the night JonBenét was killed, two windows had been left slightly open to allow the passage of electrical cords for the outside Christmas lights, and there were also a broken basement window and one unlocked door. Smit's theory was that someone entered the Ramsey home through the broken basement window. Critics have questioned this theory, because there was an intact cobweb in the basement window. The steel grate that covered the window also had undisturbed cobwebs, and the foliage around the grate had been undisturbed. There were also cobwebs in the tracks of various windows, and dust and debris were on some sills. Smit believed that the intruder subdued JonBenét using a stun gun and took her down to the basement. JonBenét was killed and a ransom note was left.

Smit's theory was supported by former FBI agent John E. Douglas, who had been hired by the Ramsey family. (Note: In his book The Cases That Haunt Us, former FBI agent John E. Douglas (hired by the Ramsey family) writes that he quibbled with a few of Smit's interpretations but generally agreed with his investigation and conclusions. Douglas particularly praised Smit's discovery in autopsy photos of what appeared to be previously overlooked evidence of a "stun gun" having been used to subdue JonBenét.) Believing that the Ramseys were innocent, Smit resigned from the investigation on September 20, 1998, five days after the grand jury was convened against the Ramseys. While no longer an official investigator on the case, Smit continued to work on it until his death in 2010.

Author Stephen Singular in his book Presumed Guilty (1999, revised 2016) refers to consultations with cyber-crime specialists to argue JonBenét attracted the attention of child pornographers and pedophiles affiliated with the child pageant scene. Singular further believes the investigation was overly focused on the Ramsey parents, hampering investigation into alternate scenarios, and the Ramseys were not responsible for the murder other than perhaps unwittingly exposing their daughter to sexual predators. Singular speculates this scenario explains why the grand jury did not recommend indicting the Ramsey parents for murder, but for child abuse or endangerment for placing their daughter in a risky situation.

It was determined that there had been more than 100 burglaries in the Ramseys' neighborhood in the months before JonBenét's murder. There were 38 registered sex offenders living within a 2-mile (3.2 km) radius of the Ramseys' home. In 2001, former Boulder County prosecutor Trip DeMuth and Boulder County Sheriff's Detective Steve Ainsworth stated that there should be a more aggressive investigation of the intruder theory.

One of the individuals whom Smit identified as a suspect was Gary Howard Oliva, who was arrested for "two counts of attempted sexual exploitation of a child and one count of sexual exploitation of a child" charges in June 2016. Oliva, a registered sex offender, was publicly identified as a suspect in an October 2002 episode of 48 Hours Investigates.

In The Killing of JonBenét: The Truth Uncovered, broadcast by A&E on September 5, 2016, DNA and forensic scientist expert Lawrence Kobilinsky stated that, based on forensic DNA analysis of evidence, "an unidentified male committed this crime".

The District Attorney's office investigating pedophiles indicated to former Denver prosecutor Craig Silverman that the District Attorney's office followed the intruder theory. The Ramseys developed a relationship with District Attorney Mary Lacy and her office, which was criticized by authorities such as the city's mayor, Leslie L. Durgin. (Note: The city's mayor Leslie L. Durgin said, "I'm extremely concerned about the relationship between the district attorney's office and the Ramsey attorneys. The perception is that they are closer than we thought." Ann Louise Bardach, Vanity Fair journalist, wrote that there were weekly breakfast meetings between a Ramsey defense lawyer and Peter Hofstrom, the prosecutor's liaison to the Ramsey family.) Silverman said, "Once you have conceded the possibility of an intruder, I don't see how any Ramsey could ever be successfully prosecuted."

=== Karr confession ===
John Mark Karr, a 41-year-old school teacher, was arrested in Bangkok, Thailand, on August 15, 2006, following a false confession to murdering JonBenét. Karr claimed to have drugged, sexually assaulted, and accidentally killed JonBenét. According to CNN, "Authorities also said they did not find any evidence linking Karr to the crime scene."

In the confession, Karr had provided only basic facts that were publicly known and failed to provide any additional convincing details. The claim that JonBenét was drugged cast further doubt on the confession because the autopsy indicated no drugs were found in her body. Furthermore, Karr's DNA did not match DNA found on JonBenét's body. (Note: Authorities had tracked Karr down by using the Internet after emails were sent regarding the case to Michael Tracey, a journalism professor at the University of Colorado. After Karr was arrested and brought back to the US, he was released to face extradition for child pornography charges that originated in Sonoma County, California. These charges against him were subsequently dismissed due to lack of evidence. While he was under investigation, the press coverage of Karr's false confession was described as a media frenzy. He was ultimately never charged in the case.)

== Defamation lawsuits ==
L. Lin Wood, the Ramsey family libel attorney, filed defamation lawsuits against several people and companies that had reported on the case, starting in 1999. The family sued Star magazine and its parent company, American Media, Inc., on their son's behalf in 1999. Defamation suits have been filed by the Ramseys and their friends against several unnamed media outlets. A defamation suit was filed in 2001 against the authors and publisher of JonBenét: Inside the Ramsey Murder Investigation (2000). The suit against Don Davis, Steven Thomas, and St. Martin's Press was settled out of court the following year.

John and Patsy Ramsey were sued in two defamation lawsuits arising from the publication of their book, The Death of Innocence (2001). These suits were brought by two people named in the book who were said to have been investigated by Boulder police as suspects in the case. The Ramseys were defended in those lawsuits by Lin Wood and three other Atlanta attorneys, James C. Rawls, Eric P. Schroeder, and S. Derek Bauer. They obtained a dismissal of both lawsuits.

In November 2006, Rod Westmoreland, a friend of John Ramsey, filed a defamation suit against an anonymous web surfer using the pseudonym "undrtheradar" who had posted two messages on Internet forums implicating Westmoreland in the murder.

During a September 2016 interview with CBS Detroit and in The Case of: JonBenét Ramsey documentary television program, forensic pathologist Werner Spitz accused Burke Ramsey of killing his sister. On October 6, 2016, Burke filed a defamation lawsuit against Spitz. Burke and his attorneys, who include Lin Wood, sought a total of $150 million in punitive and compensatory damages. Wood said he would also file a suit against CBS at the end of October 2016.

On December 28, 2016, Burke Ramsey's lawyers filed an additional civil lawsuit that accused CBS, the production company Critical Content LLC, and seven experts and consultants of defamation of character. They sought $250 million in compensatory damages and $500 million in punitive damages.

In January 2018, a judge denied the CBS motion to dismiss, and the suit was allowed to proceed. In January 2019, Wood announced that the lawsuit had been settled "to the satisfaction of all parties."

== In popular culture ==
JonBenét has been portrayed by Dyanne Iandoli in the miniseries Perfect Murder, Perfect Town (CBS) (2000); by Julia Granstrom in the TV movie Getting Away with Murder: The JonBenet Ramsey Story (Fox) (2000); by Payton Lepinski in Lifetime's Who Killed Jonbenet (2016); and Emily Mitchell in the Netflix miniseries The Murder of JonBenét Ramsey (2026).

Industrial metal performer SKYND has published a song 'JonBenét Ramsey' with a visualizer video on 20th of November 2026.

== See also ==
- List of murdered American children
- Disappearance of Madeleine McCann
- Death of Paulette Gebara Farah
