= Touch DNA =

Forensic method for analyzing DNA evidence

Touch DNA, also known as Trace DNA, is a forensic method for analyzing DNA left at the scene of a crime. It is called "touch DNA" because it only requires very small samples, for example from the skin cells left on an object after it has been touched or casually handled, or from footprints. Touch DNA analysis only requires seven or eight cells from the outermost layer of human skin. The technique has been criticized for high rates of false positives due to contamination—for example, fingerprint brushes used by crime scene investigators can transfer trace amounts of skin cells from one surface to another, leading to inaccurate results. Because of the risk of false positives, it is more often used by the defense to help exclude a suspect rather than the prosecution.

The technique is very similar to Low Copy Number DNA analysis, to the extent that court rulings have sometimes confused the two. However, in LCN DNA analysis, the DNA goes through additional cycles of PCR amplification.

== Method ==
Touch DNA relies on the STR analysis of cells collected off of objects. Upon collection, the cells' DNA is extracted, and 13 genomic locations that vary among individuals are assessed to confirm suspects or exonerate those that are innocent.

== Notable use cases ==
=== United States ===
- The duct tape found with the remains of Caylee Anthony was tested for the presence of touch DNA during the criminal case against her mother, Casey Anthony. Richard Eikelenboom testified for the defense that none of Caylee's DNA was found on the tape.
- Touch DNA was introduced in the third trial of David Camm by the defense. The DNA profile of another man, Charles Boney, was found on a number of objects at the crime scene, including the panties of Camm's wife Kim and a fingernail that is thought to have broken off during the struggle. The DNA evidence aided in his acquittal of the murders.
- In 2008, the parents of JonBenet Ramsey were cleared as suspects in her 1996 murder following an analysis of touch DNA on her clothing. The family had long been the target of suspicion by the media, the police, and the public in the death of 6 year old JonBenet. The DNA also cleared John Mark Karr, a teacher who was arrested for the murders in 2006. The DNA was determined to belong to an unknown male. The case remains unsolved.
- The prosecution used touch DNA to help build their case against James Biela for the murder of Brianna Denison. Touch DNA was collected from the doorknob of the residence where Brianna was staying when she was abducted. A DNA sample obtained from panties found near the body was later matched to the touch DNA and to Biela himself.
- In December 2012, a homeless man named Lukis Anderson was charged with the murder of Raveesh Kumra, a Silicon Valley multimillionaire, based on DNA evidence. Anderson was drunk and nearly comatose, hospitalized, under constant medical supervision, the night of the murder. Anderson's DNA was accidentally transferred to the crime scene by paramedics who had arrived at Kumra's residence. The paramedics had treated Anderson earlier the same day—accidentally transferring Anderson's DNA to the crime scene hours later. The case was presented to the annual American Academy of Forensic Sciences meeting in Las Vegas, as a definitive example of a DNA transfer implicating an innocent person.
- In December 2015, police officer Daniel Holtzclaw was convicted of 18 felony counts, charges stemming from allegations of sexual assault, based on Touch DNA found on one of the alleged victims.

== See also ==
- LCN DNA – a similar method to obtain DNA profiles from very small samples.
