= Murder of Joyce Malecki =

Unsolved 1969 murder in Maryland, US

Joyce Malecki
- Malecki, c. 1969
- Born: Joyce Helen Malecki; June 12, 1949; Baltimore, Maryland, U.S.
- Died: November 11, 1969 (aged 20); Anne Arundel County, Maryland
- Cause of death: Strangulation
- Body discovered: Patuxent River, Anne Arundel County, Maryland
- Resting place: Loudon Park Cemetery, Maryland, U.S. 39.1654°N 76.4047°W (approximate)
- Occupation: Credit Control Administrator
- Known for: Victim of unsolved murder
- Height: 5 ft 7 in (1.70 m)

The murder of Joyce Malecki is an unsolved case which occurred in Baltimore, Maryland, on November 11, 1969 in which a 20-year-old office clerk was abducted and murdered before her body was discarded within the Little Patuxent River on the perimeter of Fort Meade. Her body was discovered two days later. An autopsy revealed she had been sexually assaulted, bludgeoned, stabbed in the throat, then strangled to death.

Despite contemporary police efforts, Malecki's murder remained unsolved and the case gradually became cold. The investigation into her murder was renewed following the screening of the 2017 Netflix documentary series The Keepers. In December 2023, Malecki's body was exhumed in efforts to extract DNA evidence from her body in the ongoing effort to identify her murderer or murderers.

Malecki's murder has been speculated to have been committed by the same individual responsible for the murder of Catherine Cesnik and/or the murder of up to four other individuals committed within the Baltimore region between 1970 and 1981, although these theories have never been proven and no physical evidence exists to substantiate these claims.

== Biography ==
Joyce Helen Malecki was born on June 12, 1949, in Baltimore County, Maryland, to Casimir Patrick and Doris Marion (née Johnson) Malecki. She had four brothers: Casimir Patrick Jr. (known as "Pat"); Donald Joseph; Michael Jerry; and Darryl. She also had one sister named Darlene. Malecki was of Polish and British ancestry. Her family was Catholic, and regularly attended service at St. Clement Roman Catholic Church.

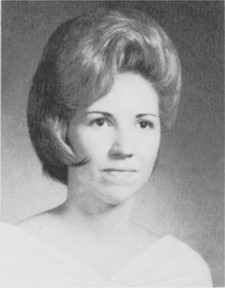
Malecki, c. 1967

The Malecki family lived on Laverne Avenue in Lansdowne. Joyce worked as a Credit Control Administrator at a southwest Baltimore liquor distribution firm named Key Wine and Liquor Company. She has been described as a vivacious, family-oriented and compassionate individual who invariably treated others with kindness and respect. By November 1969, she had been dating a soldier named James Gault, who was stationed at nearby Fort Meade, for approximately seven weeks.

== November 11, 1969 ==
On the afternoon of Tuesday November 11, 1969, Joyce asked her parents if she could drive their 1967 Chevrolet Impala to the Harundale Mall in Glen Burnie, with view to early Christmas shopping and later meeting her boyfriend for a date. Her parents agreed and Joyce drove to the mall alone in their vehicle as opposed to her own vehicle. The last individual in the family to speak with Joyce was her 17-year-old brother, Darryl. She was wearing a green jacket, a brown turtleneck sweater, and plaid slacks.

When Joyce failed to return home that evening, her family assumed she had chosen to spend the night with a female friend. As such, she was not reported missing until the following morning.

=== Disappearance ===
Approximately two hours after Malecki was reported missing, one of her older brothers drove to Fort Meade to speak with Gault, only to learn she had failed to arrive at the base the evening prior. While driving home, her brother discovered Malecki's vehicle parked approximately 10 feet (3.0 m) from a phone booth in front of the Vegas Club in Odenton with the keys still in the ignition, her driving glasses on the dashboard, and her purchases from the Harundale Mall upon one of the passenger seats. Human bloodstains were also evident upon the rear seat of the vehicle.

Subsequent police enquiries revealed that although Malecki had called Gault from the Harundale Mall at approximately 9:45 p.m. to inform him she was on her way to collect him from Fort Meade and would arrive in approximately fifteen minutes, she had failed to arrive at the base. Her overall demeanor throughout the brief call had conveyed no sense of trouble or anxiety. Gault himself had waited for Malecki until midnight before returning to his barracks.

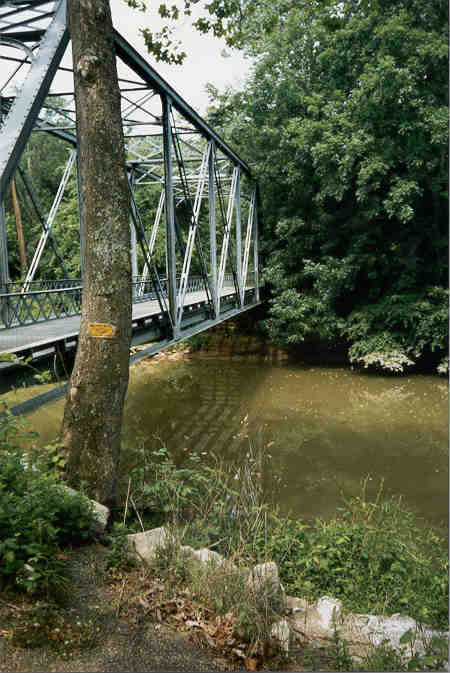
The Little Patuxent River. Malecki's body was discovered o the banks of this river on November 13, 1969.

== Body discovery ==
On the morning of November 13, two deer hunters intending to construct a hunting blind on the western perimeter of Fort Meade's Soldier Park training area discovered Malecki's body partially submerged on the bank of the Little Patuxent River. She was discovered fully clothed save for her shoes and lying face-down with her hands bound behind her back. Her shoes were soon located upon the bank of the river, close to her body. An examination of the crime scene revealed no footprints or signs of a struggle, indicating that Malecki's murder had not occurred at this location and that her body had been discarded over a six-foot bank overlooking the crime scene and had evidently rolled into the river.

FBI agents and military police secured the crime scene and Malecki's body was transported to the Baltimore City Morgue to undergo an autopsy. (Note: No forensic pathologist was present upon Fort Meade on the date of the discovery of Malecki's body. As such, her body was transported to the Baltimore City Morgue to undergo an autopsy.) Her body was formally identified by her family later the same day.

=== Autopsy ===
Malecki's autopsy was performed by Dr. Isidore Mihalakis on the afternoon of November 14. His report determined the cause of death to be strangulation. Mihalakis also found clear evidence Malecki had been subjected to a sexual assault prior to death, with numerous scratches, bruises and abrasions upon Malecki's face, forehead and body—in addition to fifteen superficial knife cuts to the neck—indicating she had evidently struggled with her assailant or assailants prior to her murder. Skin and flesh scrapings were also discovered beneath her fingernails. Furthermore, she had most likely been deceased when her body was placed in the river.

In addition to the numerous superficial cuts inflicted to Malecki's throat, her throat also bore a single, deep knife wound; however, this wound was insufficient to cause her death. Furthermore, Malecki's wrists had been bound behind her body with knapsack cord prior to her body being placed over the embankment, and a section of loose cord remained between the knotted ends of this binding.

=== Funeral ===
Joyce Malecki was laid to rest on the morning of November 18, 1969. Her interment followed a wake held the previous evening, followed by a 9 a.m. Requiem Mass held at St. Clement Roman Catholic Church in accordance with her Roman Catholic faith. She was laid to rest within Loudon Park Cemetery in Baltimore, Maryland.

== Initial investigation ==
Malecki's body was discovered upon federal property. As such, the case therefore fell under the jurisdiction of the FBI. Ten agents were assigned to investigate Malecki's murder and although several leads were pursued and the special agent in overall charge of the Baltimore field office, Edwin Raymond Tully, claimed to have a number of suspects, (Note: Malecki's boyfriend, Private James Gault, was extensively questioned by FBI agents on November 13 and 14; he was quickly eliminated from the inquiry.) all leads of inquiry ultimately failed to bear fruit.

Both the FBI and local investigators were unable to discount a possible link between Malecki's abduction and murder and the recent disappearance of Catherine Cesnik, which had occurred just four days prior to Malecki's abduction, although an Anne Arundel County Police Department (AACPD) spokesman did emphasize no conclusive evidence existed to connect the cases. (Note: Catherine Cesnik was a Catholic religious sister who taught at Archbishop Keough High School.) In addition to the abductions occurring just four days apart, both women had been shopping at the Harundale Mall shortly before their abductions and were of similar build. Furthermore, the cars of both women were located with the keys still in the ignition. However, the FBI was unable to conclusively link the two cases.

Controversy remains as to which government agency assumed and maintained overall command of the original investigation into Malecki's murder, just how much evidence and documentation was shared between respective investigative agencies, the potential ramifications of this dispute and/or these decisions, and as such, why the contemporary investigation gradually became cold. Although consensus remains Malecki's body was discovered upon federal property and that the FBI had assumed initial responsibility for the investigation, in later years, the FBI would insist they had delegated overall command of the investigation to the AACPD upon determining the case was not a federal issue; however, the Anne Arundel County Police would later insist the investigation into Malecki's murder was never fully assigned to them and that resultingly, they themselves had never actively investigated Malecki's murder to the degree they would have had they believed full responsibility for the case fell upon themselves.

== Later developments ==
=== Potential link to murder of Catherine Cesnik ===
In 1994, two former Archbishop Keough High School students who had suffered alleged sexual abuse at the hands of Father Joseph Maskell filed a lawsuit against the Archdiocese of Baltimore. Maskell had been the priest of St. Clement Roman Catholic Church—where the Malecki family had worshipped—between 1966 and 1968; he also worked as a counselor and chaplain at Archbishop Keough High School between 1967 and 1975 in addition to serving as a military chaplain at Fort Meade.

Throughout his tenure at Archbishop Keough High School, Maskell is alleged to have sexually abused numerous girls before his 1975 dismissal following several complaints from parents pertaining to his alleged misconduct. One of the staff members at Archbishop Keough High School was 26-year-old Sister Catherine Cesnik, who is strongly believed to have discovered Maskell and other staff members—including Father Edward Neil Magnus—had been sexually abusing pupils shortly before her November 7, 1969 murder. Cesnik's body was discovered in a remote area of Lansdowne on January 3, 1970. The cause of death was determined to be extensive blunt force trauma to the skull.

Although Cesnik's murder remains unsolved, she is strongly believed to have been murdered to prevent her notifying authorities of the ongoing child sexual abuse occurring within Archbishop Keough High School. (Note: One of the former pupils to file the 1994 lawsuit, Jean Hargadon Wehner, has alleged that Maskell had driven her to a wooded area days after Cesnik's disappearance to show her Cesnik's body.)

Malecki had known Maskell via her church and had harbored a strong dislike for him—even informing her family and friends they should "stay away" from him. However, although she is known to have once attended a week-long religious retreat in which Maskell had served as a spiritual advisor, no evidence exists to suggest she had been one of his abuse victims.

Maskell was removed from the priesthood in 1992 shortly after further allegations of his sexual abuse of minors were filed against the Catholic Church; he subsequently fled the country and died of natural causes at age 62 on May 7, 2001. He and Magnus are believed to have sexually abused a minimum of thirty-nine minors—the vast majority, though not all, female—throughout the 1960s and 1970s.

On February 28, 2017, Maskell's body was exhumed in order to undergo DNA testing for comparison against a DNA profile developed from evidence recovered at the scene of Cesnik's murder. Although Maskell's DNA did not match the original 1970 forensic profile, this development does not definitively discount him as a suspect in Cesnik's murder.

=== Other homicides ===
The murders of Malecki and Cesnik have been speculated to be linked to four further murders committed within the Baltimore region between 1970 and 1981. All four of these murder victims were teenagers, three of whom had alleged connections to Maskell and Magnus and/or two Catholic Baltimore-area parishes where Maskell had served or lived during the years the murders had occurred. Only two of these four murders—those of 16-year-old Pamela Lynn Conyers and 13-year-old Heather Ann Porter—have since been solved, and the respective perpetrators of both murders are not known to have committed any other homicides or to have had any links to the Catholic Church.

Pamela Lynn Conyers disappeared from Harundale Mall on October 16, 1970. Her body was discovered less than a week later in Anne Arundel County, placed between the eastbound and westbound lanes of what was then Maryland Route 177 (now Maryland Route 100).

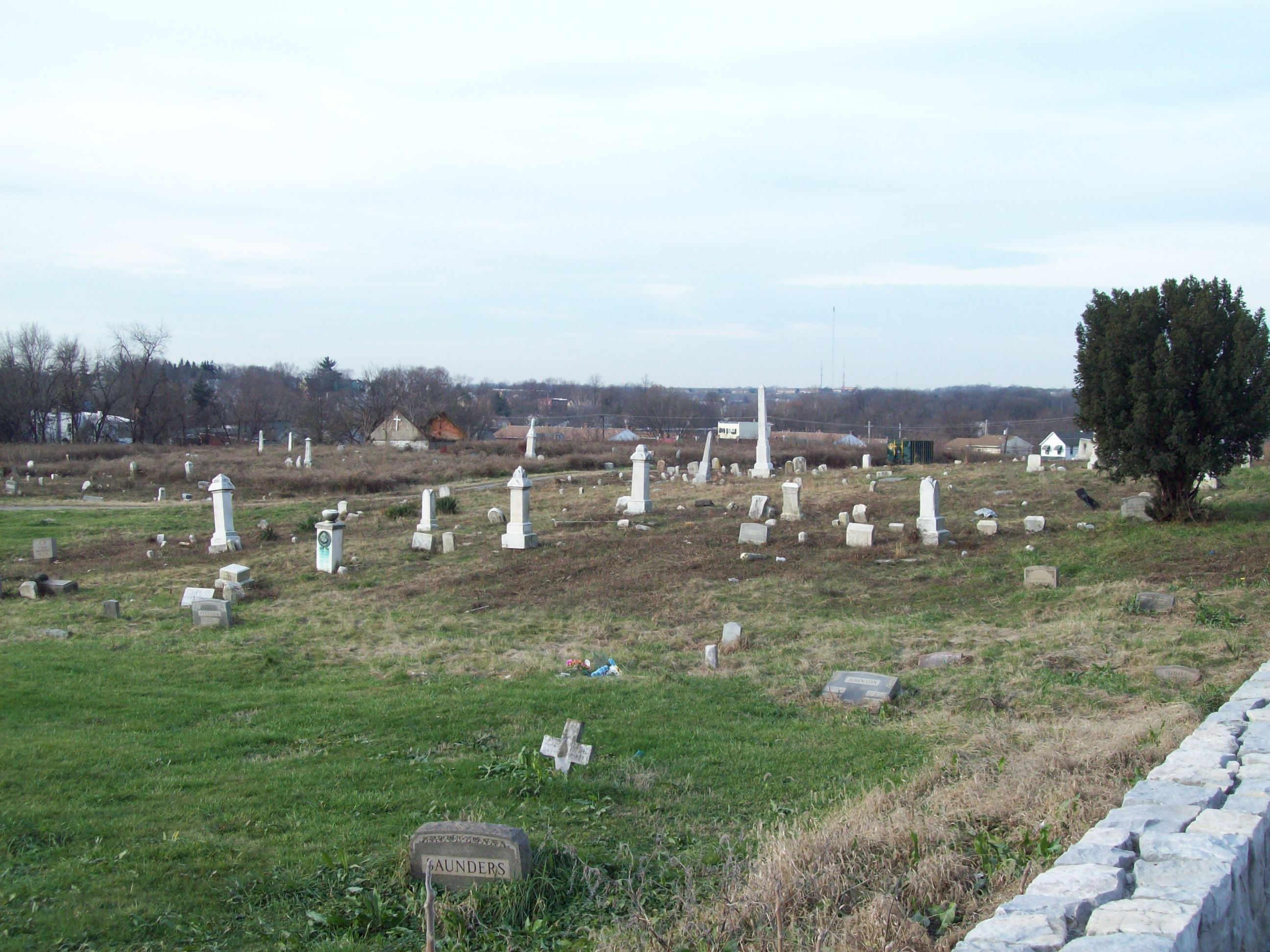
Mount Auburn Cemetery. Montanye's body was discovered at this location on September 29, 1971.

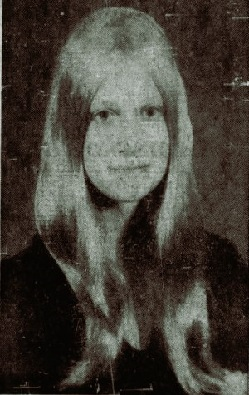
Grace Montanye

On September 27, 1971, a 16-year-old Franklin High School cheerleader named Grace Elizabeth Montanye disappeared from a shopping center in Reisterstown. Her bludgeoned body was found discarded behind a Catholic Church close to Mount Auburn Cemetery in South Baltimore two days later.

Francis Daniel Crocetti, a 14-year-old altar boy, was stabbed to death with an ice pick on the evening of March 24, 1975; his body was discovered in woodland behind the Our Lady of Victory Church in Catonsville. At the time of Crocetti's death, Maskell had served within and resided at the rectory of this church. Six years later, in September 1981, a 14-year-old parishioner of the Our Lady of Victory Church, Heather Ann Porter, was abducted in Halethorpe; her strangled body was discovered in nearby woodland the following day.

Via DNA profiling, Porter's murderer was identified as John Anthony Petrecca, Jr. in September 2021. Petrecca—a convicted rapist—had lived in Halethorpe and was 38 years old at the time of Porter's murder; he had died of natural causes at the age of 56 in January 2000.

In March 2023, investigators announced they had identified the perpetrator of Pamela Lynn Conyers' murder as Forrest Clyde Williams III. This identification was facilitated via the use of genetic testing and forensic genealogy. Williams—21 years old at the time of Conyers' murder—had died of natural causes at the age of 69 in March 2018.

"They want justice out of this thing. Even though it was fifty-four years ago, it would certainly help [the family] to know what happened."

— Kurt Wolfgang, executive director of the Maryland Crime Victims Resource Center, referencing the lasting impact of Malecki's murder upon her family (2023).

== Ongoing investigation ==
Public interest pertaining to the murders of Malecki and Cesnik was renewed following the 2017 release of the documentary series The Keepers. Consequently, the Baltimore County Police Department reopened the investigation into Cesnik's murder—also reviewing a possible connection between Cesnik's murder and that of Joyce Malecki.

The FBI remains the lead agency investigating Malecki's murder, although some of the evidence pertaining to the original investigation is believed to have been lost. Current overall command of the investigation has not been delegated to the Anne Arundel County Police Department.

With the consent of her family, on December 14, 2023, the FBI exhumed Malecki's body in efforts to extract potential DNA evidence as part of the ongoing investigation into her murder. The exhumation was conducted in private, although Malecki's surviving relatives were allowed to be present. Her body was later placed in a new coffin and re-interred in the same grave. The FBI's Baltimore field office declined to comment to the media as to the specifics regarding the exhumation, citing "respect for the ongoing investigation" into Malecki's murder.

== Media ==
=== Bibliography ===
- Newton, Michael (2004). The Encyclopedia of Unsolved Crimes. New York: Facts on File. ISBN 978-0-8160-7818-9.
- Okonowicz, Ed (2009). True Crime: Maryland: The State's Most Notorious Criminal Cases. Pennsylvania: Stackpole Books. ISBN 978-0-811-74171-2.

=== Television ===
- The seven-part documentary series The Keepers focuses upon the murder of Joyce Malecki in the first episode of the series. Commissioned by Netflix, this series was first broadcast on May 19, 2017, with the first episode — titled "The Murder" — exploring the possibility Malecki's murder was committed by the same individual responsible for the murder of Catherine Cesnik just four days prior to Malecki's death.

== See also ==
- Cold case
- Crime in Maryland
- List of solved missing person cases: 1950–1999
- List of unsolved murders (1900–1979)

== Cited works and further reading ==
- Branson, Jack; Branson, Mary (2011). Delayed Justice: Inside Stories from America's Best Cold Case Investigations. Amherst, New York: Prometheus Books. ISBN 978-1-616-14392-3.
- Buchanan, Edna (2009). The Corpse Had a Familiar Face. New York City: Gallery Books. ISBN 978-1-439-14114-4.
- Dunning, John (1987). Mindless Murders. London: Mulberry Editions. ISBN 978-1-873-12333-1.
- Evans, Colin (1996). The Casebook of Forensic Detection: How Science Solved 100 of the World's Most Baffling Crimes. New York: John Wiley & Sons Inc. ISBN 978-0-471-07650-6.
- Fisher, Bonnie S.; Lab, Steven P. (2010). Encyclopedia of Victimology and Crime Prevention. Los Angeles: Sage Publishing. ISBN 978-1-412-96047-2.
- Halber, Deborah (2014). The Skeleton Crew: How Amateur Sleuths Are Solving America's Cold Cases. Cambridge: Cambridge University Press. ISBN 978-1-107-04145-5.
- Jeffers, H. Paul (1991). Profiles In Evil: Chilling Case Histories From the Files of the FBI's Violent Crime Unit. London: Warner Books. ISBN 978-0-708-85449-5.
- Katz, Hélèna (2010). Cold Cases: Famous Unsolved Mysteries, Crimes, and Disappearances in America. Santa Barbara: Greenwood Publishing Group. ISBN 978-0-313-37692-4.
- Mellins, Maria; Moore, Sarah (2022). Critiquing Violent Crime in the Media. New York: Springer International Publishing. ISBN 978-3-030-83758-7.
- Nash, Jay Robert (1983). Open Files: A Narrative Encyclopedia of the World's Greatest Unsolved Crimes. London: The Rowman & Littlefield Publishing Group, Inc. ISBN 978-0-070-45907-6.
- Pettem, Silvia (2013). Cold Case Research: Resources for Unidentified, Missing, and Cold Homicide Cases. Boca Raton: CRC Press. ISBN 978-1-466-57053-5.
