= Carroll E. Stansbury =

Chief of the Baltimore County Police Department

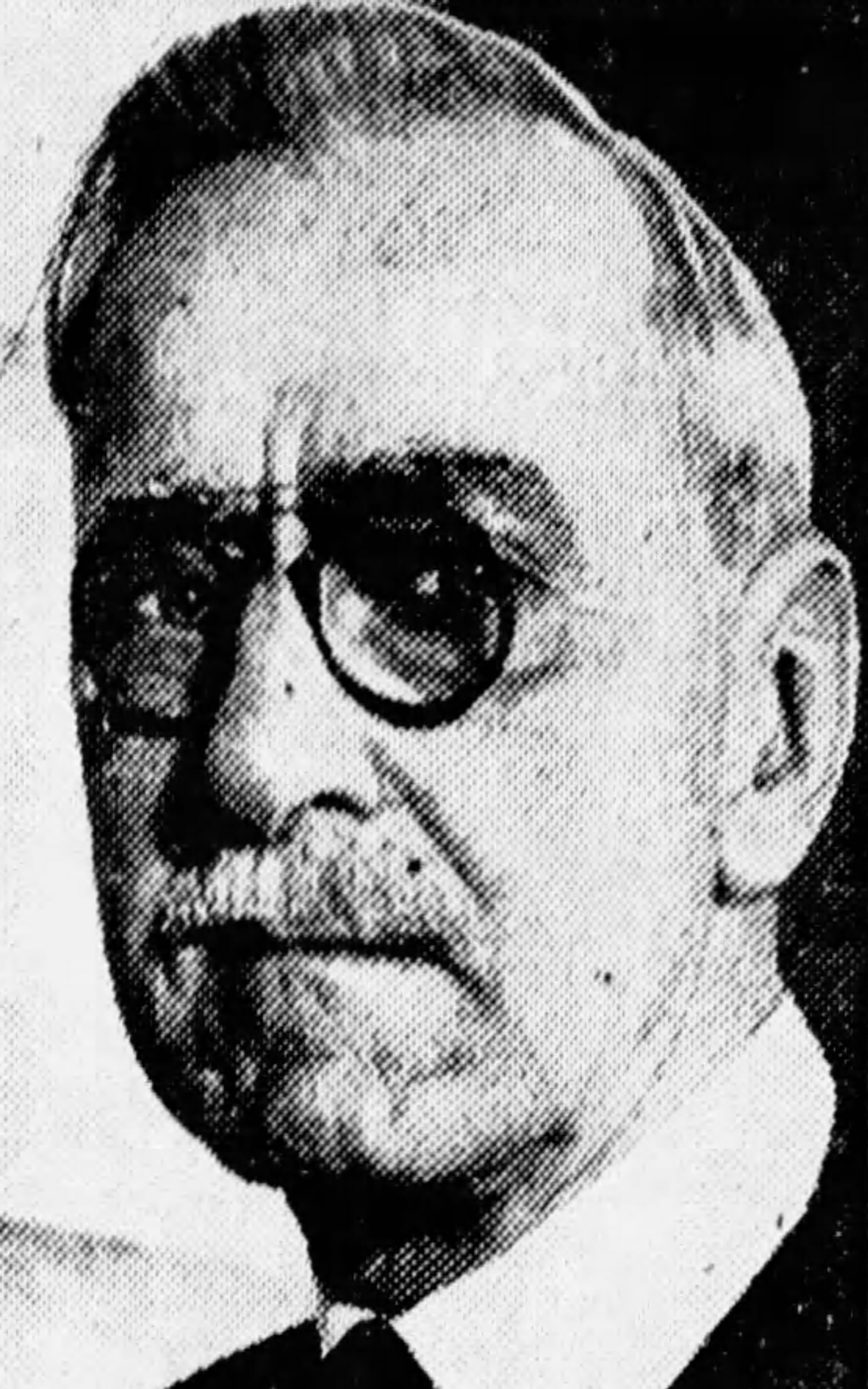
- Stansbury, c. 1936

Chief of the Baltimore County Police Department (marshal until 1931) (Note: Stansbury's official title was changed from "marshal" to "chief" in 1931; he was interchangeably referred to as "chief" or "marshal" for the rest of his tenure.)
- In office December 10, 1918 – May 1, 1939
- Preceded by: John C. Cockey
- Succeeded by: Herman H. Meyer

Personal details
- Born: 1874 or 1875
- Died: June 20, 1947 (aged 72); Pikesville, Maryland, U.S.
- Spouse: Annie Maude Bowen
- Children: 3

Carroll E. Stansbury (1874 or 1875 – June 20, 1947) was an American police officer who served as marshal of the Baltimore County Police Department (BCoPD) from 1918 to 1931, then as chief from 1931 to 1939. Throughout his 20-year tenure – the longest of any BCoPD head – Stansbury led the department through the Roaring Twenties and Great Depression and helped the department recover from the annexation of areas of Baltimore County into the independent city of Baltimore.

== Biography ==
Stansbury was born in 1874 or 1875. He was known for his collection of tobacco pipes; he smoked a pipe named "Sherlock Holmes" during tough criminal investigations. He was married to Annie Maude Stansbury (née Bowen) at the time of his death and had a son – John T. Stansbury – and two daughters. He died at his home in Pikesville, Maryland, on June 20, 1947, at the age of 72, of a heart condition. His funeral was held at his home and he was buried at Druid Hill Cemetery.

== Career ==
=== Appointment and early tenure ===
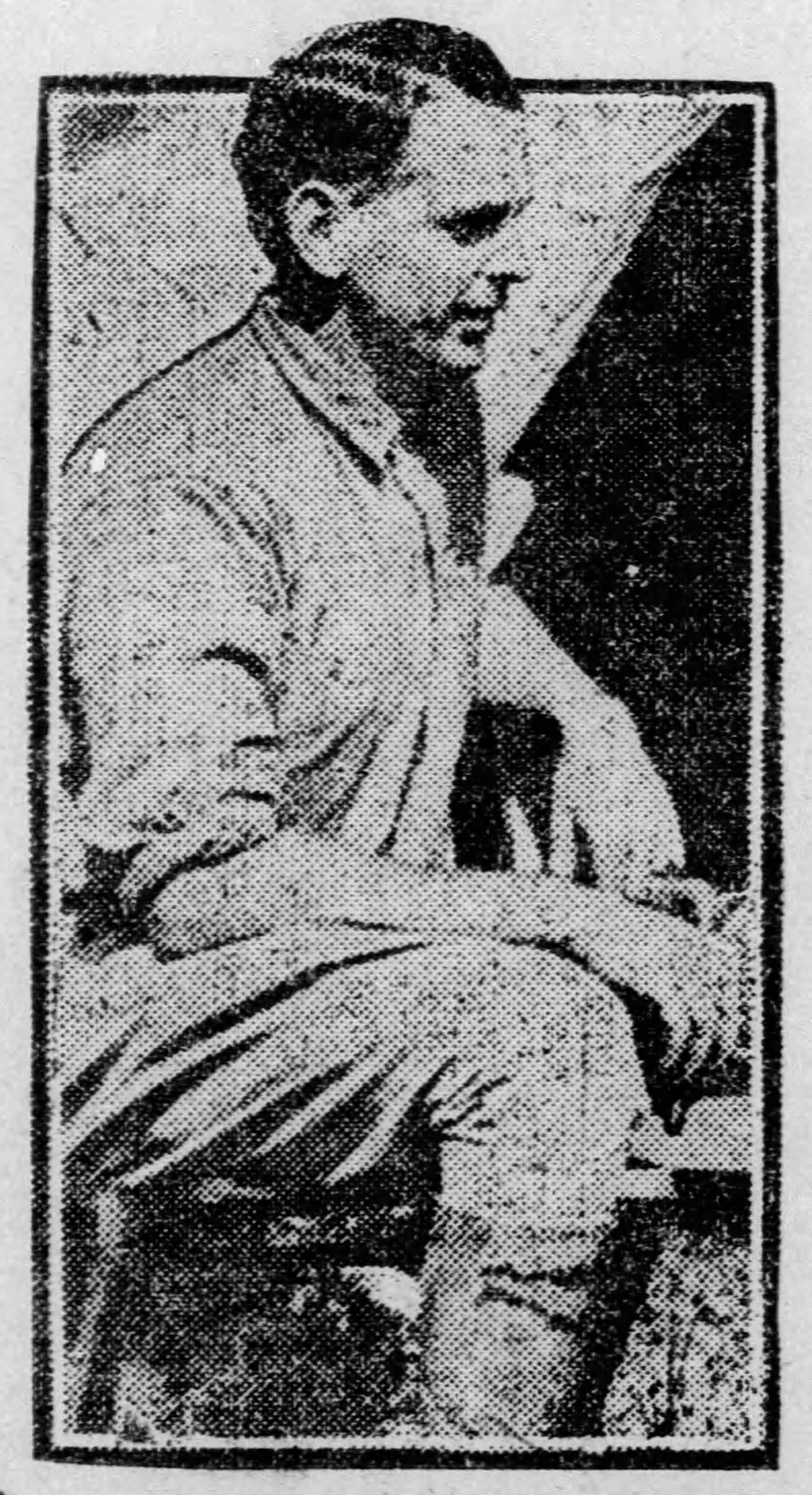
Stansbury succeeded John C. Cockey, who died in office.

Previous marshal John C. Cockey died on October 30, 1918, at the age of 34, of the Spanish flu. Alongside the annexation of areas of Baltimore County into the independent city of Baltimore, the strength of the BCoPD was severely reduced. While the annexation caused questions of whether the BCSD was sufficient to patrol the remaining area, the Baltimore board of county commissioners decided to retain the BCoPD and appoint Stansbury, who was then a sergeant, as marshal on December 10. The new BCoPD had 18 officers in total – Stansbury, two sergeants, and 15 patrolmen.

=== 1920s ===
Throughout the Roaring Twenties, the BCoPD grew and established professional procedures under Stansbury. The Maryland General Assembly passed several laws to help reform the BCoPD, including establishing a board of police examiners in 1920, who checked each potential officer. The General Assembly also reduced the maximum age for applicants from 45 to 40 in 1922.

The county commissioners awarded a $153,347 (roughly $2.75 million in 2024) contract to the G. Walter Lowell Contractors to build five stations in Baltimore County; they were built in Dundalk, Fullerton, Essex, Halethorpe, and Pikesville. After the Halethorpe station was opened, the St. Denis one was closed.

The Roaring Twenties brought increased access to automobiles, which led to an increased need for traffic enforcement; the department focused on speeding and reckless driving. In 1926, the BCoPD issued 709 traffic citations; a county grand jury reported that the BCoPD was as efficient as possible with its limited personnel.

In 1927, a new BCoPD headquarters was built in Towson, costing $3,900 ($70,596 in 2024). In the same year, Stansbury reorganized the department, establishing a second lieutenant position, which commanded the western area of the county, and promoting sergeant Edward A. Poehlmann to it. He reassigned lieutenant William B. Dorsey, who had commanded the western area, to the eastern area, which had experienced population growth.

During Prohibition, the BCoPD was criticized for poor enforcement, especially in the "Great Black Way", an area of Towson along York Road where illegal alcohol and gambling was common. Following a grand jury order, a sergeant led a raid of the Great Black Way, which arrested five and seized 246 bottles of whisky and gambling paraphernalia. The department was also criticized for its handling of the death of chemist John A. Kerner, who was suspected to have been killed by bootleggers, but the BCoPD ruled it a suicide.

=== 1930s ===
By 1930, 12 years after the annexation, the BCoPD had expanded to 48 officers covering a 656 square miles (1,700 km^{2}) area. Due to its large area, supervision was difficult, as there was no communication system, supervisors did not know officers' locations, and the officers would have to stop at their station to know if they were needed. Stansbury's title was changed from marshal to chief in 1931; despite his official title changing, he was interchangeably referred to as "chief" or "marshal" for the remainder of his tenure.

Amid the Great Depression chicken theft became a major issue in Baltimore County in 1931, and Stansbury assigned additional night officers to combat the thefts. In 1931, unemployment in Baltimore city reached 19.2%, and the unemployment stretched into Baltimore County. Crime also became an increasing issue in rural Baltimore County, which was highlighted by multiple burglaries throughout the county in mid-1934. The burglaries were hard to counter, as it was unknown when the burglaries happened and who perpetrated them.

The lack of available disciplinary actions against misbehaving officers hindered the department, as only the commissioners could remove officers; Stansbury could only reassign them. The commissioners gave him the ability to discipline officers and issued an order that "rather than transferring [misbehaving officers] and jeopardizing other stations thereby penalizing men who are performing their duty, the Marshal is to file charges with us requesting their dismissal".

Seeking to modernize the department, the BCoPD installed shortwave radio receivers in each patrol car in September 1937; while the radios received BPD signals and the BCoPD had to call the BPD to transmit messages, it improved communications. All cars also had sirens installed in 1937.

To address problems with traffic enforcement, Stansbury sent three representatives – sergeants Fred Brown and LeRoy Kane and officer Earl Smith – to a two-week University of Maryland traffic school. After the school, the officers were expected to help create traffic laws.

While inmates at county jails began to be photographed and fingerprinted in 1920, a classification system had not yet been developed. The department appointed Oscar Grimes to develop a bureau of identification in 1927; they later appointed John Lauman to assist him. The department began inviting citizens to collect their fingerprints in April 1938; it was the first rural police department in the U.S. to launch a bureau of identification.

==== Resignation ====
In early 1939, rumors began to circulate that Stansbury would be replaced; while he remained popular, department sentiment shifted towards appointing a stricter chief. He resigned on May 1, 1939; his tenure of 20 years, 4 months, and 21 days was the longest in BCoPD history. The Turner Publishing Company retrospectively described Stansbury's tenure as "what the County Department needed to establish some stability and growth". Former U.S. Army major Herman H. Meyer was appointed chief to replace Stansbury; he resigned a month later.
