= Edmondson Village, Baltimore =

Coordinates: 39°17′49″N 76°40′51″W

Edmondson Village Edmondson
- Neighborhood of Baltimore
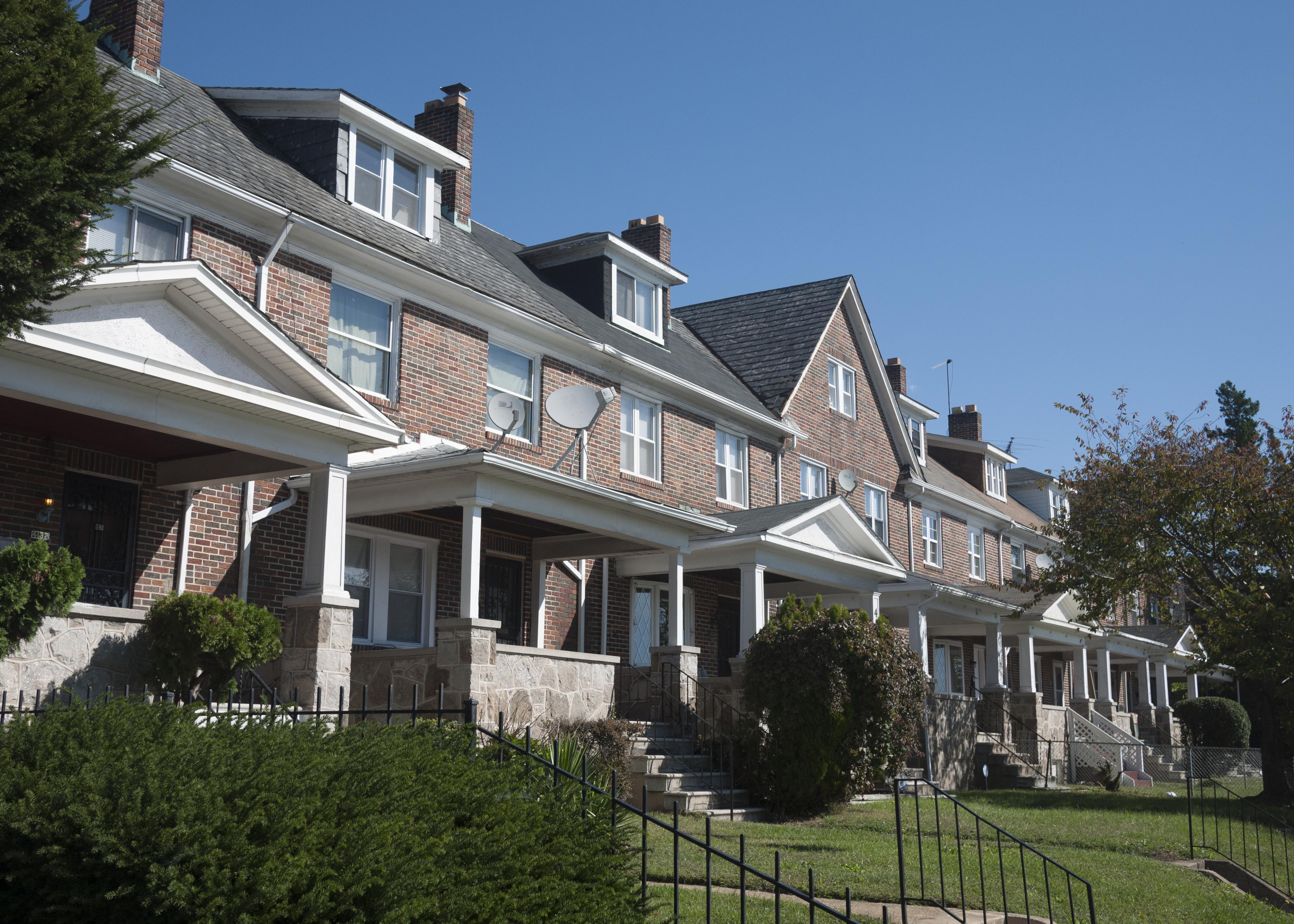
- Rowhouses along Edmondson Avenue

- Location within Baltimore
- Country: United States
- State: Maryland
- City: Baltimore
- Time zone: UTC-5 (Eastern)
  - Summer (DST): EDT
- ZIP code: 21229
- Area code: 410, 443, and 667

Edmondson Village is a neighborhood in the southwestern section of Baltimore, Maryland, encompassing most of the Edmondson Avenue corridor in 21229. The Edmondson Village area is made up of several smaller communities. Its communities include Hunting Ridge, Uplands, Rognel Heights, Wildwood, West Mulberry, Allendale, Edgewood, and Lower Edmondson Village. It is located north of Frederick Avenue, and south of the Gwynns Falls Parkway, Leakin and Gwynns Falls Parks. Communities in the area range from middle class to lower income. A notable shopping center opened in the neighborhood in 1947.

== History ==
In 1947, Joseph and Jacob Meyerhoff built Edmondson Village Shopping Center, which featured a bowling alley, movie theatre, and acres of free parking. Retail establishments at the shopping center included Hess Shoes, Food Fair, Tommy Tucker, Whelan's Drugs, and Hochschild, Kohn & Co.

Racial succession and white flight occurred in Edmondson Village as a result of the real estate sales process of blockbusting between 1955 and 1965. According to The Corner: A Year in the Life of an Inner-City Neighborhood, it was not uncommon at this time for communities within the Edmondson Village area to shift from 100% White to 100% Black in a span less than one year.

== Education ==
The neighborhood is home to Edmondson High School. Other schools in Edmondson Village include wildwood Elementary/middle school, Mary E. Rodman Elementary, and Rognel Heights Elementary/Middle, And Thomas Jefferson Elementary/Middle.

== Public transportation ==
The Edmondson Village area is served by Baltimore Link, provided by the Maryland Transit Administration.

== In popular culture ==
Bunk Moreland and Omar Little, both fictional characters from HBO's The Wire, grew up in the Edmondson Village area. Bubbles' sister lived in Edmondson Village in The Wire, and Bubbles lived in her basement for a period of time.

Edmonson Village Shopping Center was a featured location of interest in the Netflix 2017 documentary series The Keepers about the disappearance and murder of Catherine Cesnik.
