= Joseph Maskell =

American Catholic priest (1939–2001)

The Abuser Joseph Maskell
- Born: Anthony Joseph Maskell; April 13, 1939; Baltimore, Maryland
- Died: May 7, 2001 (aged 62); Stella Maris, Timonium, Maryland
- Resting place: Holy Family Cemetery, Randallstown, Baltimore County, Maryland
- Other names: A. Joseph Maskell; Tony Maskell
- Occupation: Roman Catholic priest
- Parent(s): Joseph Francis Maskell; Susie Helen Jenkins Maskell

Anthony Joseph Maskell (April 13, 1939 – May 7, 2001) was an American Catholic priest who was removed from the ministry in 1994 for sexually abusing students in several schools in Archdiocese of Baltimore, including Archbishop Keough High School between 1969 and 1975. He served the Archdiocese of Baltimore as a counselor from 1965 to 1994. The Netflix documentary series The Keepers alleges Maskell's involvement in the murder of Catherine Cesnik in 1969, after a former Keough student and abuse victim, Jean Hargadon Wehner, claimed he showed her Cesnik's body to threaten Wehner into silence. Maskell denied all accusations until his death in 2001.

== Early life ==
Anthony Joseph Maskell was born in Baltimore, Maryland, to Joseph Francis Maskell and Susie Helen Jenkins, and grew up in Northeast Baltimore. He preferred to be called Joseph in deference to Saint Joseph. After graduating from Calvert Hall College High School, Maskell went to St. Mary's Seminary in Roland Park for priesthood training. His father died in 1963.

Maskell was ordained on May 22, 1965, at the age of 26. His peers described him as "deeply intelligent" and "fascinated with psychology". In 1972, Maskell earned a master's degree in school psychology from Towson State University, and then a certificate of advanced study in counseling from Johns Hopkins University.

== Career ==
After his ordination, Maskell worked at Sacred Heart of Mary in Baltimore from 1965 to 1966, then transferred to St. Clement Church in Lansdowne, where he worked from 1966 to 1968, and then to Our Lady of Victory from 1968 to 1970. He simultaneously worked at the all-girls Archbishop Keough High School in Baltimore from 1967 to 1975 as a counselor and chaplain, but was removed from the school by a new headmistress after she received complaints about him from parents. Maskell was transferred to the Division of Schools from 1975 to 1980, served at Annunciation from 1980 to 1982 and at Holy Cross from 1982 to 1992.

The Archdiocese of Baltimore sent Maskell for treatment at The Institute of Living, a psychiatric facility in Connecticut, from 1992 to 1993 over allegations of sexual abuse. He was finally sent to St. Augustine Roman Catholic Church in Elkridge as a pastor from 1993 to 1994, before being "prohibited" from the ministry after further abuse allegations surfaced in 1994.

Maskell had also concurrently in his career served as chaplain for the Maryland State Police, the Baltimore County Police Department (BCPD), the Maryland National Guard, and the Air National Guard where he was a lieutenant colonel. He kept a police scanner and a loaded gun in his car.

== Abuse ==
Prior to accusations of sexual abuse against female students at Keough High School, Maskell was first accused of forcing an altar boy at St. Clement Church, Charles Franz, to drink wine before sexually abusing him. Franz and his mother came forward in 1967. The next year, instead of charging or removing Maskell from the ministry, the Archdiocese of Baltimore simply removed him from St. Clement and sent him to a neighboring parish, Our Lady of Victory. There, his duties included acting as the moderator of the Catholic Youth Organization (CYO). During CYO dances, Maskell frequently left a BCPD auxiliary officer to act as security while he went on ride-alongs with other BCPD officers. When sent to Our Lady of Victory, he was also assigned the position of chaplain/counselor at the all-girl Keough High School. While there, his alleged abuse continued and became progressively worse.

=== Archbishop Keough High School ===
Jean Hargadon Wehner, a student at Keough, alleged she first confided in Father E. Neil Magnus (1937–1988) in 1968 regarding sexual abuse she was subjected to at the hands of her uncle when she was a child, that began at age 14, and continued from 1968 to 1972.

Wehner alleges Magnus then sexually abused her and blamed her for being promiscuous. Wehner alleges Maskell joined in the abuse. Wehner stated she was far more frightened of Maskell, who she found to be more intimidating and threatening. Wehner alleges Maskell repeatedly called her a "whore" and forced her to swallow his semen, claiming she was "receiving the Holy Spirit."

Teresa Lancaster, another alleged victim at Keough, stated that on Halloween of 1970, Maskell drove her to a popular location where students gathered. Two police officers arrived and directed other students to leave, then raped Lancaster while Maskell waited outside the car.

According to a 2023 report released by the Attorney General of Maryland, at least 39 people have claimed that Maskell was sexually abusive towards them or someone that they know.

=== Murder of Catherine Cesnik ===
In 1969, toward the end of the school year, Wehner allegedly confided about the abuse to Catherine Cesnik, a popular nun among the students. Cesnik promised she would help, but was then transferred along with her friend, Sister Helen Russell Phillips, to Western High School for a public school outreach teaching program. Cesnik disappeared on November 7, 1969, and her body was eventually discovered on January 3, 1970. Four days after her disappearance, 20-year-old Joyce Malecki also disappeared in a nearby region. Wehner alleged that shortly after Cesnik's disappearance, Maskell took her to a wooded area to see Cesnik's decomposing body and stated, "You see what happens when you say bad things about people?"

After his death, Maskell's body was exhumed and his DNA was tested against DNA discovered on Cesnik's body. Although his DNA did not match, he was not formally ruled out as a suspect.

== Lawsuit ==
In 1992, the second sexual abuse allegation against Maskell was made public by Wehner. He was removed from the ministry that year, and sent for evaluation and "treatment" at The Institute of Living. Maskell was reinstated in 1993 after the Archdiocese claimed it was unable to corroborate the allegation through an internal investigation. However, on September 8, 1993, criminal charges regarding Wehner's allegation were filed through Maryland Deputy Attorney General Ralph S. Tyler III. The lawsuit was dropped after the court rejected repressed memories as a scientifically proven memory mechanism. In 1994, another lawsuit was filed by Wehner, this time with Lancaster and four others, included allegations against gynecologist Christian Richter, who engaged in abuse with Maskell. Lawyers representing the Archdiocese were able to have the second lawsuit dropped due to the statute of limitations.

Maskell was removed from the ministry on July 31, 1994. That same year, following the abuse allegations, Maskell fled to Wexford, Ireland, and was placed on "temporary leave". He was ordered not to perform any of his priestly duties. However, Maskell continued to practice psychology. According to Lancaster, "We do have word that there are two victims coming forward in Ireland."

The Diocese of Ferns was not made aware of Maskell's presence in Ireland by the archdiocese and it was only discovered after Maskell celebrated Mass without approval. Ferns Diocese kept a file on Maskell dating from April 19, 1995, to September 22, 1998. On June 25, 1996, Ferns Diocese, after requesting information from Baltimore regarding Maskell, was informed that he was placed on leave following accusations of sexual abuse and that his whereabouts were unknown to the Archdiocese.

== Death ==
He claimed his innocence until his death due to a stroke on May 7, 2001. Maskell's body was exhumed on February 28, 2017, prior to the release of the Netflix documentary series The Keepers, for DNA testing involving the murder of Cathy Cesnik. Maskell's DNA did not match the forensic profile from 1970, although investigators noted that this did not definitively rule him out as a suspect. Though never formally charged, the Archdiocese of Baltimore had settled with sixteen of Maskell's possible victims for a total of $472,000.

== HSE investigation in Ireland ==
In July 2017, the Health Service Executive (HSE) in Ireland opened an investigation into the employment of Maskell. As of October 2019, the HSE refused to offer any timeframe for the investigation. Abbie Schaub, a former student of Cesnik, expressed frustration that the HSE refused to release documentation to her concerning how Maskell was hired by the Eastern Health Board in 1995. She said: "Fr Maskell's employment, working with youngsters for the Irish health board, after he fled a trial for sexual abuse of minors in America, is cause for public concern. If there were problems in the background check system, these should be discussed and corrected."
