= Bernadette Armiger =

Roman Catholic nun, nurse and academic (1915–1979)

Sister Bernadette Armiger D. C.
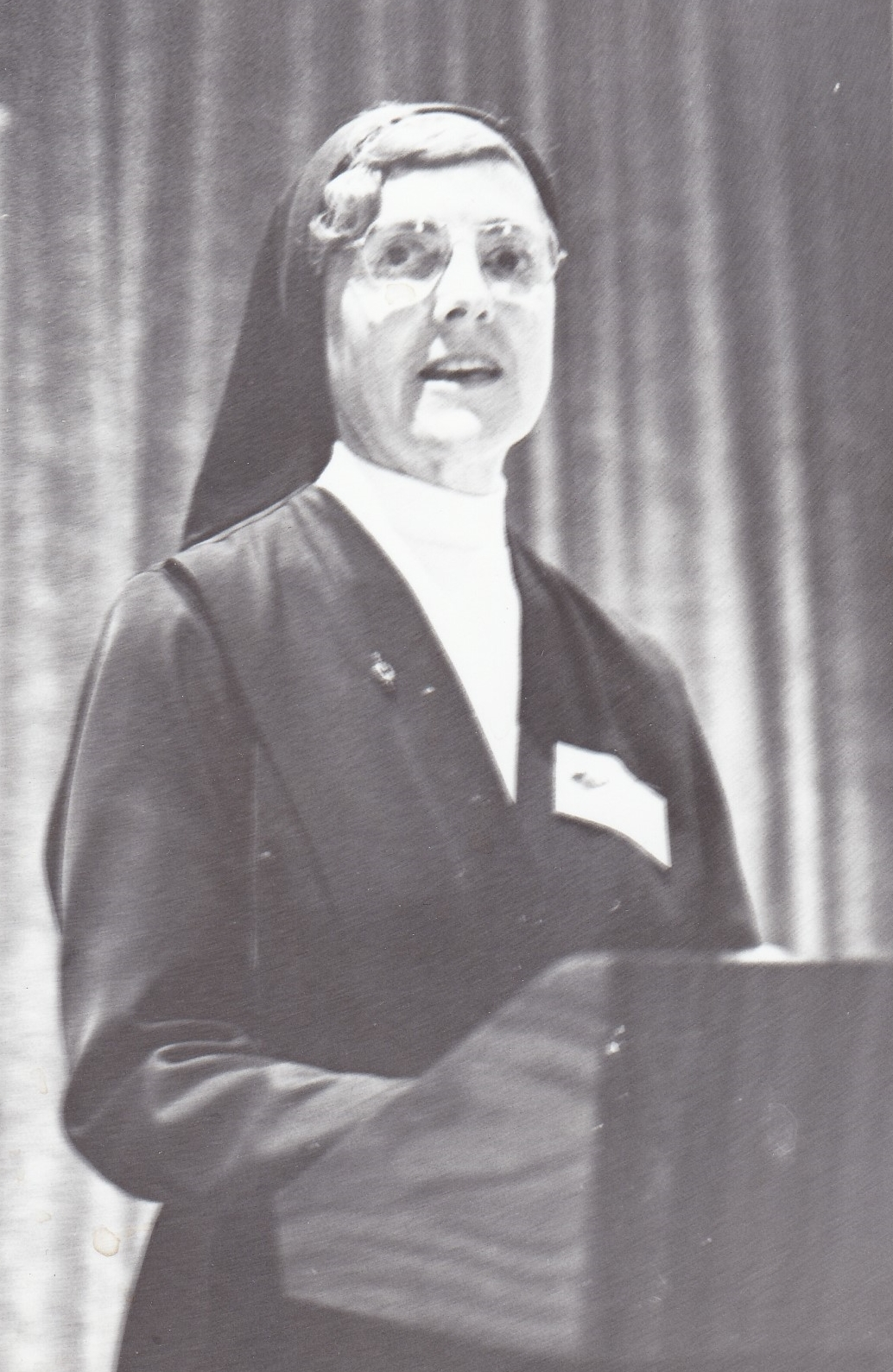

Personal life
- Born: Mary Elsa Armiger; April 7, 1915 Baltimore, Maryland
- Died: May 21, 1979 (aged 64) Buffalo, New York
- Known for: Nursing leadership, Mental health advocacy

Religious life
- Religion: Catholic

Bernadette Armiger, DC (April 7, 1915 – May 21, 1979) was an American Catholic religious sisters' who served as a nursing college dean, mental health advocate, and president of the American Association of Colleges of Nursing from 1972 to 1974. The AACN gives the Sister Bernadette Armiger Award to nurses in the US who show outstanding leadership in education at the collegiate level. She was a member of the Daughters of Charity of Saint Vincent de Paul.

== Early life and education ==
She was born Mary Elsa Armiger (Elsa) to Sara L. Harcourt Armiger (known as Sallie, Sally, or Muma) and Joseph Griffith Armiger, an accountant for the Internal Revenue Service. Elsa was the middle of seven children. She attended St. Martin's Grade School and then when the family moved switched to the parish of Our Lady of Lourdes in Utica, Maryland, both run by Daughters of Charity.[CITE] Then she went to Seton High School, later known as Seton Keough High School, and now closed. Her contact with the Daughters of Charity of St. Vincent de Paul inspired her to enter the order in 1933 (some sources say 1931). She graduated from Catholic University of America with a B.S. in nursing in 1944. She continued for a master's degree in nursing education administration, and a minor in guidance counseling in 1947, and she would eventually publish her master's thesis (The History of the Hospital Work of the Daughters of Charity of St. Vincent de Paul in the Eastern Province of the United States, 1823-1860). In 1964 she began her studies for a doctorate in psychology at St. John's University in Jamaica, New York, graduating in 1968. She received further education in health and health delivery systems at the University of Tel Aviv, Israel, in a program sponsored by the Israeli Nurses Association and the National League for Nursing.

== Teaching and nursing ==
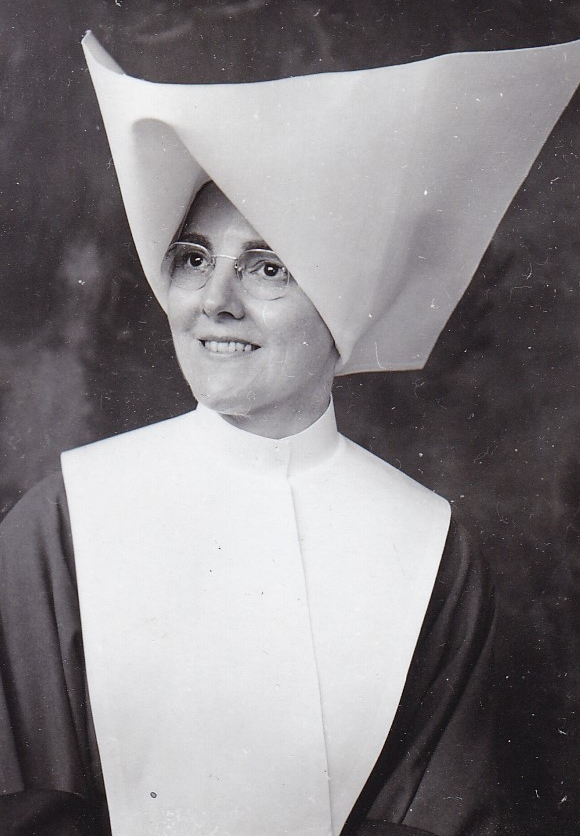
Armiger wearing the cornette that she and other Daughters of Charity nurses and sisters wore. Image provided by the Archivist of the Daughters of Charity, Emmitsburg, Maryland.

She entered the Daughters of Charity right after high school, on September 14, 1933. Before deciding on a nursing career, she spent 10 years teaching in Catholic primary grade schools, St. Francis School in Staunton, Virginia, and Lourdes School in Utica, Maryland. She completed her basic nursing training at Providence Hospital in Washington, DC, founded by the Daughters of Charity. Her first assignment was as a clinical instructor of student nurses. A fellow nurse recalled, "She put a high priority on the academic and technological preparation of the professional nurse who would literally be entrusted with the lives of many... in order to meet the total needs of ill, discouraged, frightened, or hurting people." She gave people cards with the saying, "...thus we will merrily meet in heaven..."

After earning her master's degree in 1947, she moved into leadership quickly, working as an assistant professor of graduate nursing students and directing undergraduates at Catholic University of America's Providence division at Providence Hospital, a prominent medical facility founded by her religious congregation. She was Director of Nursing at DePaul Hospital (now Bon Secours DePaul Medical Center) in Norfolk, Virginia, and in the mid-1950s director of surgical and medical nursing at the Catherine Labouré School of Nursing at Labouré College in Boston, Massachusetts, then run by the Sisters of Charity of St. Vincent de Paul, but now independent. She was part of the team overseeing the amalgamation of several programs into what became the Carney Hospital in Dorchester, Massachusetts. Then she went on to serve on the faculty at St. Joseph's Hospital School of Nursing in Emmitsburg, Maryland from 1955 to 1963, before going to doctoral studies in New York. She also served on the Board of Examiners of Nurses. While she was a doctoral candidate, she was also Administrative Chair of the Department of Nursing Education at St. John's. On August 1, 1968, after completing her doctorate, she became Dean of the Niagara University College of Nursing, a post she held for seven years, until 1975. In that role she also did individual and group psychological counseling. In 1972 she was elected President of the American Association of Colleges of Nursing. That same year she raised 1.2 million for a building for the nursing school, and she worked on its design, which the College and University Conference later cited for excellence. She received the President's Medal from Niagara university in 1975, and resigned that same year to go to Rhinebeck, New York, to spend one year leading a child guidance clinic.

== Sigma Theta Tau ==
Armiger and two others, Frances Wollner, MSN, and Mary Kornguth, MS, founded Niagara University's Nursing Honor Society in 1975, in order to become eligible for Sigma Theta Tau. Founded in 1922, Sigma is the premier honor society for the nursing profession. Armiger's fledgling honor society was granted a formal charter for membership to Sigma on March 4, 1978. Armiger was also a member of the National Nurses Association and the National League for Nursing.

== Mental health care for clergy ==
In 1976 Armiger became the first director of the Consultation Center for Clergy and Religious of the Archdiocese of Baltimore, on the grounds of Mt. St. Joseph High School, winning the post over 30 other national candidates. At that time the notion of sisters and priests with emotional problems was novel. Her center's opening came just four years after Thomas Eagleton was forced to leave the race for U.S. vice president after admitting to having sought treatment for depression, so mental health treatment as a responsible activity was very much in the news, with many considering the Eagleton outcome a disgrace and a setback. She told reporter Weldon Wallace of The Baltimore Sun that sisters and priests are expected to "have it all together--spiritually, emotionally, intellectually..." Her center would address broad-range concerns from depression to alcoholism to career and vocational suitability. She also served with the Archdiocesan Association for Spiritual Renewal and Development.

She died of leukemia at the Roswell Park Memorial Institute in Buffalo, after having concealed her illness until the last six weeks of her life. She had gone to New York for intensive treatment. Some newspapers incorrectly listed her age as 54, but she was 64. In 1982, the AACN created the Sister Bernadette Armiger Award. Besides the award, Niagara University also has a Sister Bernadette Armiger Memorial Fund for graduate studies in nursing.

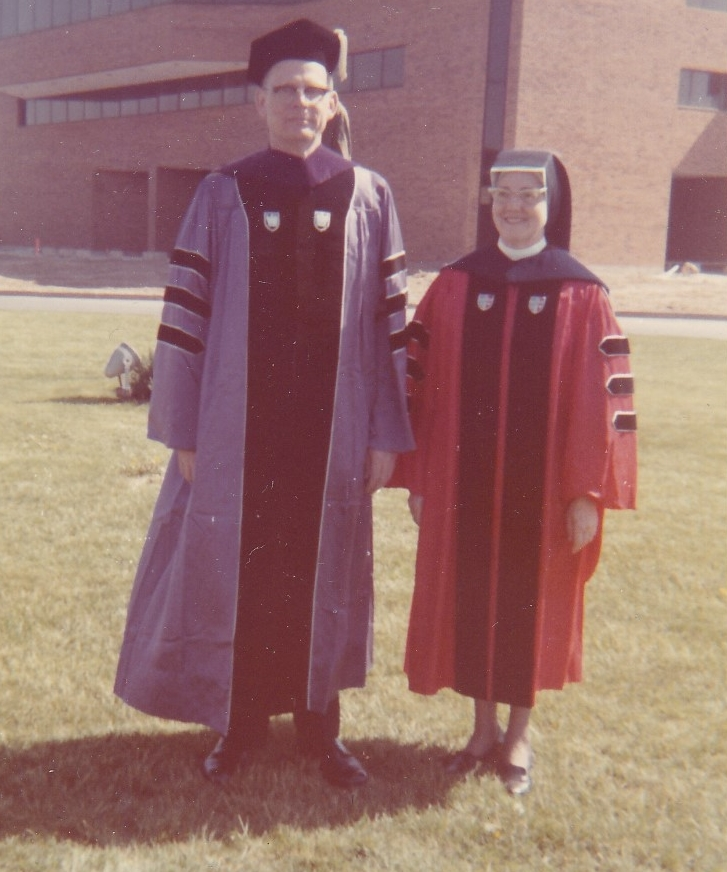
Armiger and Father John G. Nugent at Niagara University. She was the dean of the College of Nursing, and he was the president of the university.

== Other positions and awards ==
- Board member, Counseling Center for Clergy and Religious of the Diocese of Buffalo, New York
- Board member: New York State division of the American Cancer Society
- Board member: Niagara chapter of the American Red Cross
- Board member: Health Association of Niagara County, Inc.
- Advisory board: The American Journal of Nursing
- Member, American Nurses Association
- Member, American Psychological Association
- Sigma Theta Tau
- Psi Chi
- Delta Epsilon Sigma
- Service: Nursing, Research, and Education Advisory Committee, U.S. Department of Health, Education and Welfare. 1973 certificate of recognition.

== Publications ==
This list came from American Nursing: A Biographical Dictionary, and is the compilation of Kathleen Smyth. It was cross-referenced with A Bibliography of Nursing Literature 1859-1960, Alice M. C. Thompson, editor (London: Library Association for the Royal College of Nursing and National Council of Nurses of the United Kingdom, 1968).

=== Books ===
- Proceedings of the Mental Health Institute on Psychotherapy (New York: St. John's University Press, 1965).

=== Chapters in books ===
- "Patient-Centered Clinical Instruction in Medical and Surgical Nursing," in The Dynamics of Clinical Instruction in Nursing Education: The Proceedings of the Workshop on the Dynamics of Clinical Instruction in Nursing Education, Conducted at the Catholic University of America, June 11 to 22, 1954 (Washington. D.C.: Catholic University of America Press, 1955), 119-.
- "Ethics in Nursing Responsibility," in Samuel Standard, MD, and Helmuth Nathan, MD, editors, Should the Patient Know the Truth? A Response of Physicians, Nurses, Clergymen, and Lawyers (New York: Springer, 1955).
- "Patient-Centered Clinical Instruction," in The Year Book of Modern Nursing (New York: Putnam, 1956).
- "American Association of Colleges of Nursing, and the Department of Baccalaureate and Higher Degree Programs: Purposes, Roles and Relationships" in National League for Nursing Publications (New York: National League for Nursing, 1974).

=== Articles ===
- "Planning and Carrying Out a Clinical Teaching Program," Hospital Progress 38 (June 1957), 77-79.
- "Objectives of Nursing Education," The Maryland State Medical Journal 8 (April 1959), 152-54.
- "Personnel Management: Action Research Supervisory Development," Hospital Progress 41 (September 1960), 94-98.
- "Concepts and Practices: Evaluation of Student Nurses," Hospital Progress 43 (January 1962), 70-71, 162-63.
- "Tools and Techniques: Evaluation of Student Nurses," Hospital Progress 43 (March 1962), 76-79, 134.
- "Appraisal Interview: Evaluation of Student Nurses," Hospital Progress 43 (April 1962), 96-97, 162-63.
- "Challenge and Opportunity: Society's Need for Nursing," Catholic Nurse 10 (June 1962), 32-35.
- "Sister-Nurses Claimed by Cholera," Nursing Outlook 12 (September 1964), 54-56.
- "Mutual Expectations of Lay and Religious," Hospital Progress 47 (April 1966), 75-78.
- "Questioning the Right to Die: Reprise and Dialogue," Nursing Outlook 16 (October 1968), 26-28.
- "Is There a Nursing Shortage?" Nursing Outlook 21 (May 1973), 312-16.
- "The Scholarship in Nursing," Nursing Outlook 22 (March 1974): 160-62.
- "An Educational Crisis in Preparation of Deans," Nursing Outlook (March 1976).
- "Information: Prescription Against Pain," Nursing Research 20 (September–October 1976).
