= Murder of Catherine Cesnik =

Unsolved American murder case

- Born: Catherine Anne Cesnik; November 17, 1942; Pittsburgh, Pennsylvania, U.S.
- Disappeared: November 7, 1969 (aged 26); Baltimore County or Baltimore City, Maryland, U.S.
- Cause of death: Intracerebral hemorrhage caused by skull fracture
- Body discovered: January 3, 1970 (aged 27)
- Burial place: Saint Mary's Cemetery, Sharpsburg, Pennsylvania, U.S.
- Occupations: Teacher, religious sister
- Employer: Archbishop Keough High School

Catherine Anne Cesnik SSND (born November 17, 1942; disappeared November 7, 1969) was a Roman Catholic religious sister and a teacher at Archbishop Keough High School in Baltimore, Maryland, United States. On November 7, 1969, Cesnik disappeared. Her body was discovered on January 3, 1970, near a garbage dump in the Baltimore suburb of Lansdowne. Her unsolved murder served as the basis for the Netflix documentary series The Keepers in 2017.

== Biography ==
Catherine Anne Cesnik was born on November 17, 1942, in the Lawrenceville neighborhood of Pittsburgh, Pennsylvania. She was the eldest child of Joseph and Anna Omulac Cesnik. Her paternal grandparents, John (Jan) and Johanna Tomec Česnik, were Slovenians who emigrated from Yugoslavia, while her maternal grandfather, Joseph Omulac, came from Yugoslavia and maternal grandmother, Martha Hudok, came from Austria. Cesnik had three siblings.

Cesnik attended St. Mary's School on 57th Street and St. Augustine High School, both in Lawrenceville. She was valedictorian at the graduation of her high school class in 1960, after being the May Queen and the president of the senior class and the student council.

She joined the School Sisters of Notre Dame when she was 18.

== Disappearance and death ==
In the fall of 1969, Cesnik was teaching drama and English at Archbishop Keough High School in Baltimore, Maryland, a private Catholic school for girls opened in 1965. On November 7, 1969, she left the apartment she shared with Helen Russell Phillips at the Carriage House Apartments, at 131 North Bend Road in Catonsville, en route to the Edmondson Village Shopping Center to purchase a gift for her sister's engagement at Hecht's jewelry store. She cashed a paycheck at First National Bank in Catonsville that night. She may have made a purchase at Muhly's Bakery in Edmondson Village, since a box of buns from that bakery was found in the front seat of her car. At 4:40 am the next morning, Russell's friends, Father Peter McKeon and Father Gerard J. Koob; both Catholic priests, found Cesnik's car, in muddy condition, and illegally parked across from her apartment complex. Residents at the apartment complex noticed Cesnik in her car that night at approximately 8:30 pm, and others spotted her car illegally parked across the street about two hours later.

== Search and discovery of body ==
Immediately after Cesnik's disappearance, police searched the area for her body without success. On January 3, 1970, her body was found by a hunter and his son in an informal landfill located on the 2100 block of Monumental Road, in a remote area of Lansdowne. The cause of death was determined to be blunt force trauma to the head.

== Background ==
Teresa Lancaster and Jean Wehner (née Hargadon), former students at Keough, say that they were sexually abused by Keough's chaplain, the Catholic priest Joseph Maskell. The first public allegations that Maskell was connected to the murder were made in 1994. In 1995, they filed a lawsuit against Maskell, the school, gynecologist Christian Richter, the School Sisters of Notre Dame, the Archdiocese of Baltimore, and Cardinal William H. Keeler. The trial court dismissed the action as time-barred by the statute of limitations. The plaintiffs appealed. A writ of certiorari was granted by the Maryland Court of Appeals, which upheld the lower court decision, ruling in part, "... that the mental process of repression of memories of past sexual abuse does not activate the discovery rule. The plaintiffs suits are thus barred by the statute of limitation."

Wehner said that Cesnik once came to her and asked, "Are the priests hurting you?" Both women have said that she was the only member of the school's staff who helped them and other girls abused by Maskell and his compatriots, and they believe she was murdered prior to discussing the matter with the archdiocese of Baltimore. The Baltimore Sun reported in late 2016 that since 2011 the archdiocese has paid out settlements to Maskell's victims.

Wehner further alleges that, two months before Cesnik's body was discovered, and only a day or two after Cesnik disappeared in November 1969, Maskell drove her to a wooded site near Fort Meade and showed her the body. Wehner says she remembers trying repeatedly to brush off the maggots crawling on Cesnik's face while frantically repeating the words, "Help me, help me." Her account was brought into question by scientific evidence showing that it would have been impossible for maggots to be alive at that time of year. However, Werner Spitz, who worked on the case, later confirmed that there had been maggots in both the victim's mouth and trachea when found. Meteorological records also reveal that temperatures during the week in question were warm enough for maggots to hatch. The Huffington Post reported that Maskell told Wehner, "You see what happens when you say bad things about people?"

Several days later, on November 13, 1969, the body of Joyce Malecki, a 20-year-old woman who looked like Cathy, was discovered by two hunters in the same wooded location where Maskell had driven Wehner.

Cesnik's body was not found until January 3, 1970, and its discovery by two hunters was not in the same area, but on the open hill trash dump of a small business property in Lansdowne.

In 2016, the Baltimore County Police Department (BCoPD) reassigned the case, prompting new interviews and further investigation into the alleged sexual abuse at Keough. After obtaining permission from the state's attorney's office, the BCoPD exhumed the body of Maskell, who died of a major stroke in 2001, but did not find a DNA match to evidence from the crime scene. Police spokeswoman Elise Armacost announced that this discovery does not exclude Maskell from being a suspect in the case.

In 2015 The Huffington Post, and in 2017 CBS Baltimore repeated the three women's allegations that during Cesnik's tenure at Archbishop Keough High School, two priests at the school, Maskell and E. Neil Magnus, were sexually abusing the girls at the school in addition to trafficking them to others.

In 2023 investigation of similar crimes in the Baltimore area has shed new light on this case.

The murder of Sister Cesnik contributed to the 2023 bankruptcy decision of the Baltimore Catholic Archdiocese.

== Academic opinion ==
Cesnik's death and the surrounding controversy have been the subject of academic study including the book The Horror of Police.

== In popular culture ==
Netflix produced a seven-part documentary series about the case called The Keepers, which debuted on May 19, 2017. The series features interviews with women who were Cesnik's students, with some who say they were sexually abused by Maskell and others.

== See also ==
- Crime in Baltimore
- List of unsolved murders (1900–1979)
