= Living for the Dead =

2023 American reality tv series

- Official promotional poster
- Genre: Reality television; Comedy; Paranormal
- Created by: Kristen Stewart; C.J. Romero
- Starring: Roz Hernandez; Juju Bae; Logan Taylor; Ken Boggle; Alex LeMay
- Country of origin: United States
- Original language: English
- No. of seasons: 1
- No. of episodes: 8

Production
- Executive producers: Kristen Stewart; Rob Eric; Renata Lombardo; CJ Romero
- Running time: 45–48 minutes
- Production company: Scout Productions

Original release
- Network: Hulu
- Release: October 18, 2023

Living for the Dead is an American paranormal reality television series created by Kristen Stewart and C.J. Romero for Hulu. The series follows a group of LGBTQ paranormal experts traveling to haunted locations to communicate with supernatural spirits. The eight-episode series was released on October 18, 2023. The first season was removed from Hulu in October 2024 without an official statement from the platform.

== Synopsis ==
A group of queer people with connections to the paranormal travel around the United States to various haunted locales "to heal the beings who occupy them--dead or alive."

== Paranormal experts ==
- Roz Hernandez, a paranormal researcher and podcaster
- Logan Taylor, a psychic medium
- Ken Boggle, a tarot card reader and medium
- Juju Bae, a witch and spiritual healer
- Alex LeMay, a ghost hunter

== Production ==
The series was created by C.J. Romero and actress Kristen Stewart. Executive producer Rob Eric of Queer Eye stated that the series is different from other ghost hunter series in that the purpose is to communicate with, not provoke, the dead. Stewart is also the series narrator. The series showrunner is Elaine White.

Hulu removed the series from its platform in October 2024 with no official cancellation announcement.

== Release ==
All eight episodes of the series were released on Hulu in the united states, Disney+ under the Star banner internationally and Star+ In Latin America. on October 18, 2023.

== Critical reception ==
Owen Myers of The Guardian described Living for the Dead in a positive review, "While Living for the Dead has its touching moments, the show knows exactly what it is: sassy, spooky entertainment for Halloween party pre-gaming, best enjoyed with cocktail in hand." In a mainly positive review for Decider, Joel Keller wrote, "The ghost hunting part is sometimes played up for camp and at other times taken very seriously by members of the team. Listen, those parts are going to either be wildly entertaining or come off as complete horseshit, depending on what you believe about the presence of spirits. But the emotions expressed by the team and the bond they’re forging with each other and the people they help is real."

== Awards and nominations ==
=== 2024 ===
- Nominee, GLAAD Award for Outstanding Reality Series
- Nominee, Queerty Queerties Award for Reality/Docuseries
- Nominee, Daytime Emmy Award for Outstanding Cinematography
