= Roz Hernandez =

American actress and comedian

- Born: 1990-1991; Grand Rapids, Michigan, U.S.
- Occupations: Comedian; paranormal investigator
- Years active: 2010–present
- Website: rozhernandeztour.com

Roz Hernandez is an American comedian and paranormal expert. She is known for her role in the Hulu reality TV show Living for the Dead and her podcast Ghosted! by Roz Hernandez.

== Career ==
Hernandez began her performance career as a clown, inspired by her father, who was also a clown. She started doing stand-up in drag in 2010, and eventually had a monthly show under the name Roz Drezfalez.

Hernandez played the character of Janice Ian in the Peaches Christ "Mean Gays" show, and had a role in the feature film Moon Manor.

Her podcast, Ghosted! by Roz Hernandez, was inspired by the conclusion of Celebrity Ghost Stories. The show joined the Exactly Right Podcast Network in 2023. Guest Busy Philipps said that Hernandez and Sam Pancake saved her life by thwarting an attempted murderer at her home.

Hernandez had the role of paranormal researcher in Living for the Dead, a "Gay Scooby-Doo" show produced by Kristen Stewart. She has said that ghosts would touch her feet at night, and tried to escape to sleep at nearby hotels.

Hernandez was featured in the 2024 Netflix documentary Outstanding: A Comedy Revolution and reflected on difficulties faced by transgender women comedians from the prevalence of jokes made at their expense. She later told Vulture: "It’s time for transgender women to be the ones making jokes about transgender women on major platforms."

Hernandez appeared in the second season of GLAAD's Dímelo series in 2024, and was described as "the most fabulous ghost hunter ever born" in Vulture's Best New Up-and-Coming Comedians to Watch in 2024.

== Personal life ==
Hernandez is a transgender woman of Mexican and Irish descent from a Catholic family. She believes that her childhood home in Grand Rapids, Michigan, was haunted. She is also a recovering addict.
