= List of Catholic universities and colleges in the United States =

There are 181 U.S. members of the Association of Catholic Colleges and Universities (ACCU) as of 2026. They make up a significant number of the total of Catholic universities and colleges in the world.

== Affiliated with religious orders ==
=== Adorers of the Blood of Christ ===
- Newman University (Wichita, Kansas)

=== Assumptionists (Augustinians of the Assumption) ===
- Assumption University (Worcester, Massachusetts)

=== Augustinian (Order of Saint Augustine) ===
- Merrimack College (North Andover, Massachusetts)
- Villanova University (Villanova, Pennsylvania)

=== Basilian (Congregation of St. Basil) ===
- University of St. Thomas (Houston, Texas)

=== Benedictine (Order of Saint Benedict) ===
- Belmont Abbey College (Belmont, North Carolina)
- Benedictine College (Atchison, Kansas)
- Benedictine University (Lisle, Illinois)
- College of Saint Benedict (St. Joseph, Minnesota)
- College of St. Scholastica (Duluth, Minnesota)
- Donnelly College (Kansas City, Kansas)
- Mount Marty University (Yankton, South Dakota)
- Saint Anselm College (Goffstown, New Hampshire)
- Saint John's University (Collegeville, Minnesota)
- Saint Joseph Seminary College (Saint Benedict, Louisiana)
- Saint Leo University (St. Leo, Florida)
- Saint Martin's University (Lacey, Washington)
- Saint Vincent College (Latrobe, Pennsylvania)
- University of Mary (Bismarck, North Dakota)

=== Brothers of Christian Instruction ===
- Walsh University (North Canton, Ohio)

=== Christian Brothers (Congregation of Christian Brothers) ===
- Iona University (New Rochelle, New York)

=== Congregation of Sisters of St. Agnes ===
- Marian University (Fond du Lac, Wisconsin)

=== De La Salle Christian Brothers / Lasallian (Institute of the Brothers of the Christian Schools) ===
- Christian Brothers University (Memphis, Tennessee)
- La Salle University (Philadelphia, Pennsylvania)
- Lewis University (Romeoville, Illinois)
- Manhattan University (Riverdale, Bronx, New York)
- Saint Mary's College of California (Moraga, California)
- Saint Mary's University of Minnesota (Winona, Minnesota)

=== Dominican (Order of Preachers) ===
- Albertus Magnus College (New Haven, Connecticut)
- Aquinas College (Grand Rapids, Michigan)
- Aquinas College (Nashville, Tennessee)
- Aquinas Institute of Theology (St. Louis, Missouri)
- Barry University (Miami Shores, Florida)
- Bayamón Central University (Bayamón, Puerto Rico)
- Caldwell University (Caldwell, New Jersey)
- Dominican School of Philosophy and Theology (Berkeley, California)
- Dominican University (River Forest, Illinois)
- Dominican University New York (Orangeburg, New York)
- Dominican University of California (San Rafael, California)
- Edgewood University (Madison, Wisconsin)
- Molloy University (Rockville Centre, New York)
- Mount Saint Mary College (Newburgh, New York)
- Ohio Dominican University (Columbus, Ohio)
- Providence College (Providence, Rhode Island)
- St. Thomas Aquinas College (Sparkill, New York)

=== Edmundite (Society of Saint Edmund) ===
- Saint Michael's College (Colchester, Vermont)

=== Franciscan ===
==== First Order of Saint Francis (Order of Friars Minor) ====
- Franciscan School of Theology (Oceanside, California)
- Quincy University (Quincy, Illinois)
- St. Bonaventure University (Olean, New York)
- Siena University (Loudonville, New York)

==== Third Order of Saint Francis ====
- Alvernia University (Reading, Pennsylvania) - Bernardine Sisters of St. Francis
- Alverno College (Milwaukee, Wisconsin) - School Sisters of St. Francis
- Briar Cliff University (Sioux City, Iowa) - Sisters of St. Francis of Dubuque
- Felician University (Lodi, New Jersey) - Felician Sisters
- Franciscan Missionaries of Our Lady University (Baton Rouge, Louisiana) - known as Our Lady of the Lake College until 2016
- Franciscan University of Steubenville (Steubenville, Ohio) - Franciscan Friars of the Third Order Regular
- Hilbert College (Hamburg, New York) - Franciscan Sisters of St. Joseph
- Madonna University (Livonia, Michigan) - Felician Sisters of Livonia
- Marian University (Indianapolis, Indiana) - Sisters of St. Francis Oldenburg
- Neumann University (Aston, Pennsylvania) - Sisters of St. Francis of Philadelphia
- St. Francis College (Brooklyn Heights, New York) - Franciscan Brothers of Brooklyn
- Saint Francis University (Loretto, Pennsylvania) - Franciscan Friars of the Third Order Regular
- University of Saint Francis (Fort Wayne, Indiana) - Sisters of St. Francis of Perpetual Adoration
- University of St. Francis (Joliet, Illinois) - Sisters of St. Francis of Mary Immaculate
- Villa Maria College (Buffalo, New York) - Felician Sisters
- Viterbo University (La Crosse, Wisconsin) - Franciscan Sisters of Perpetual Adoration

=== Grey Nuns ===
- D'Youville University (Buffalo, New York)

=== Holy Cross (Congregation of Holy Cross) ===
- Holy Cross College (Notre Dame, Indiana) - also associated with Brothers of Holy Cross
- King's College (Wilkes-Barre, Pennsylvania)
- St. Edward's University (Austin, Texas)
- Saint Mary's College (Notre Dame, Indiana) - Sisters of the Holy Cross
- Stonehill College (Easton, Massachusetts)
- University of Holy Cross (New Orleans, Louisiana)
- University of Notre Dame (Notre Dame, Indiana)
- University of Portland (Portland, Oregon)

=== Jesuit (Society of Jesus) ===
- Boston College (Chestnut Hill, Massachusetts)
- Canisius University (Buffalo, New York)
- College of the Holy Cross (Worcester, Massachusetts)
- Creighton University (Omaha, Nebraska)
- Fairfield University (Fairfield, Connecticut)
- Fordham University (Bronx, New York, New York, New York & West Harrison, New York)
- Georgetown University (Washington, D.C.)
- Gonzaga University (Spokane, Washington)
- John Carroll University (University Heights, Ohio)
- Le Moyne College (DeWitt, New York)
- Loyola Marymount University (Los Angeles, California)
- Loyola University Chicago (Chicago, Illinois)
- Loyola University Maryland (Baltimore, Maryland)
- Loyola University New Orleans (New Orleans, Louisiana)
- Marquette University (Milwaukee, Wisconsin)
- Regis University (Denver, Colorado)
- Rockhurst University (Kansas City, Missouri)
- Saint Joseph's University (Philadelphia, Pennsylvania)
- Saint Louis University (St. Louis, Missouri)
- Saint Peter's University (Jersey City, New Jersey)
- Santa Clara University (Santa Clara, California)
- Seattle University (Seattle, Washington)
- Spring Hill College (Mobile, Alabama)
- University of Detroit Mercy (Detroit, Michigan)
- University of San Francisco (San Francisco, California)
- University of Scranton (Scranton, Pennsylvania)
- Xavier University (Cincinnati, Ohio)

=== Missionaries of the Precious Blood ===
- Calumet College of St. Joseph (Whiting, Indiana)
- Saint Joseph's College (Rensselaer, Indiana)

=== Norbertine (Order of Canons Regular of Prémontré) ===
- St. Norbert College (De Pere, Wisconsin)

=== Oblates of St. Francis de Sales ===
- DeSales University (Center Valley, Pennsylvania

=== School Sisters of Notre Dame ===
- Mount Mary University (Milwaukee, Wisconsin)
- Notre Dame of Maryland University (Baltimore, Maryland)

=== Sinsinawa Dominican Sisters ===
- Dominican University (River Forest, Illinois)
- Edgewood University (Madison, Wisconsin)

=== Sisters of Charity ===
- Clarke University (Dubuque, Iowa), Sisters of Charity of the Blessed Virgin Mary
- University of Mount Saint Vincent (Riverdale, Bronx, New York), Sisters of Charity of New York
- Mount St. Joseph University (Cincinnati, Ohio), Sisters of Charity of Ohio
- Saint Elizabeth University (Morristown, New Jersey), Sisters of Charity of Saint Elizabeth of New Jersey
- Seton Hill University (Greensburg, Pennsylvania), Sisters of Charity of Seton Hill of Greensburg
- Spalding University (Louisville, Kentucky), Sisters of Charity of Nazareth
- University of the Incarnate Word (San Antonio, Texas), Sisters of Charity of the Incarnate Word
- University of Saint Mary (Leavenworth, Kansas), Sisters of Charity of Leavenworth

=== Sisters of Christian Charity ===
- Assumption College for Sisters (Denville, New Jersey)

=== Sisters of Divine Providence (Congregation of Divine Providence) ===
- La Roche University (McCandless, Pennsylvania), Sisters of Divine Providence, Maria de la Roche Province
- Our Lady of the Lake University (San Antonio, Texas)

=== Sisters of the Holy Family of Nazareth ===
- Holy Family University (Philadelphia, Pennsylvania)

=== Sisters of Mercy ===
- Carlow University (Pittsburgh, Pennsylvania
- College of Saint Mary (Omaha, Nebraska)
- Georgian Court University (Lakewood, New Jersey)
- Gwynedd Mercy University (Gwynedd Valley, Pennsylvania)
- Maria College (Albany, New York)
- Mercy College of Health Sciences (Des Moines, Iowa)
- Mercy College of Ohio (Toledo, Ohio)
- Mercyhurst University (Erie, Pennsylvania)
- Misericordia University (Dallas, Pennsylvania)
- Mount Aloysius College (Cresson, Pennsylvania)
- Mount Mercy University (Cedar Rapids, Iowa
- Saint Joseph's College of Maine (Standish, Maine)
- Saint Xavier University (Chicago, Illinois)
- Salve Regina University (Newport, Rhode Island)
- Trocaire College (Buffalo, New York)
- University of Detroit Mercy (Detroit, Michigan)
- University of Saint Joseph (West Hartford, Connecticut)

=== Sisters of Notre Dame de Namur ===
- Emmanuel College (Boston, Massachusetts)
- Notre Dame de Namur University (Belmont, California), offering graduate programs only since 2021
- Trinity Washington University (Washington, D.C.)

=== Sisters of the Presentation of Mary ===
- Rivier University (Nashua, New Hampshire)

=== Sisters of Providence (Montreal) ===
- University of Providence (Great Falls, Montana)

=== Sisters of Providence of Saint Mary-of-the-Woods ===
- Saint Mary-of-the-Woods College (Terre Haute, Indiana)

=== Sisters of St. Basil the Great (Ukrainian Catholic Church in the US) ===
- Manor College (Jenkintown, Pennsylvania)

=== Sisters of St. Joseph ===
- Avila University (Kansas City, Missouri)
- Chestnut Hill College (Philadelphia, Pennsylvania)
- Elms College (Chicopee, Massachusetts)
- Mount St. Mary's University (Los Angeles, California)
- Regis College (Weston, Massachusetts)
- St. Catherine University (St. Paul, Minnesota)
- St. Joseph's University (Brooklyn and Patchogue, New York)

=== Sisters, Servants of the Immaculate Heart of Mary ===
- Immaculata University (Malvern, Pennsylvania)
- Marywood University (Scranton, Pennsylvania)

=== Society of the Divine Word ===
- Divine Word College (Epworth, Iowa)

=== Society of the Holy Child Jesus ===
- Rosemont College (Rosemont, Pennsylvania)

=== Society of Mary (Marianists) ===
- Chaminade University of Honolulu (Honolulu, Hawaii)
- St. Mary's University (San Antonio, Texas)
- University of Dayton (Dayton, Ohio)

=== Spiritans (Congregation of the Holy Spirit) ===
- Duquesne University of the Holy Spirit (Pittsburgh, Pennsylvania)

=== Ursuline (Sisters of Mount Saint Joseph) ===
- Brescia University (Owensboro, Kentucky)

=== Vincentian (Congregation of the Mission) ===
- DePaul University (Chicago, Illinois)
- Niagara University (Lewiston, New York)
- St. John's University (Jamaica, New York)

== Diocesan ==
- Carroll College (Helena, Montana), Diocese of Helena
- Catholic International University (Charles Town, West Virginia), Diocese of Wheeling–Charleston
- Donnelly College (Kansas City, Kansas), Archdiocese of Kansas City in Kansas
- Gannon University (Erie, Pennsylvania), Diocese of Erie
- Loras College (Dubuque, Iowa), Archdiocese of Dubuque
- Mount St. Mary's University (Emmitsburg, Maryland), Archdiocese of Baltimore
- St. Ambrose University (Davenport, Iowa), Diocese of Davenport
- St. Thomas University (Miami Gardens, Florida), Archdiocese of Miami
- Seton Hall University (South Orange, New Jersey), Archdiocese of Newark
- Thomas More University (Crestview Hills, Kentucky), Diocese of Covington
- University of Saint Mary of the Lake (Mundelein, Illinois), Archdiocese of Chicago
- University of St. Thomas (Saint Paul, Minnesota) Archdiocese of Saint Paul and Minneapolis

== Pontifical ==
- Catholic University of America (Washington, D.C.)
- Pontifical Catholic University of Puerto Rico (Ponce, Puerto Rico)

== Independent ==
- Augustine Institute (Florissant, Missouri)
- Ave Maria University (Ave Maria, Florida)
- Bellarmine University (Louisville, Kentucky)
- Christendom College (Front Royal, Virginia)
- Divine Mercy University (Sterling, Virginia)
- Dominican University of California (San Rafael, California),
- Holy Apostles College and Seminary (Cromwell, Connecticut)
- Holy Spirit College (Atlanta, Georgia)
- John Paul the Great Catholic University (San Diego, California)
- Marymount University (Arlington, Virginia)
- Maryville University (St. Louis, Missouri)
- Mexican American Catholic College (San Antonio, Texas)
- Sacred Heart University (Fairfield, Connecticut)
- Thomas Aquinas College (Santa Paula, California)
- Thomas More College of Liberal Arts (Merrimack, New Hampshire)
- Universidad del Sagrado Corazón (San Juan, Puerto Rico)
- University of Dallas (Irving, Texas)
- University of San Diego (San Diego, California)
- Wheeling University (Wheeling, West Virginia)
- Wyoming Catholic College (Lander, Wyoming)
- Xavier University of Louisiana (New Orleans, Louisiana), the only Catholic HBCU, founded by the Sisters of the Blessed Sacrament

== Catholic dental schools ==
- Creighton University School of Dentistry (Omaha, Nebraska)
- Marquette University School of Dentistry (Milwaukee, Wisconsin)
- University of Detroit Mercy School of Dentistry (Detroit, Michigan)

== Catholic engineering schools ==
- Benedictine College School of Engineering (Atchison, Kansas)
- Catholic University School of Engineering (Washington, D.C.)
- Christian Brothers University School of Engineering (Memphis, Tennessee)
- Fairfield University School of Engineering (Fairfield, Connecticut)
- Gannon University College of Engineering and Business (Erie, Pennsylvania)
- Gonzaga University School of Engineering and Applied Science (Spokane, Washington)
- Loyola Marymount University College of Science and Engineering (Los Angeles, California)
- Manhattan University School of Engineering (Riverdale, New York)
- Marquette University College of Engineering (Milwaukee, Wisconsin)
- Saint Louis University Parks College of Engineering, Aviation and Technology (St. Louis, Missouri)
- Sacred Heart University (Fairfield, Connecticut)
- Saint Martin's University Hal and Inge Marcus School of Engineering (Lacey, Washington)
- St. Mary's University School of Science, Engineering and Technology (San Antonio, Texas)
- Santa Clara University School of Engineering (Santa Clara, California)
- Seattle University College of Science and Engineering (Seattle, Washington)
- University of Dayton School of Engineering (Dayton, Ohio)
- University of Detroit Mercy College of Engineering and Science (Detroit, Michigan)
- University of Mary School of Engineering (Bismarck, North Dakota)
- University of Notre Dame College of Engineering (South Bend, Indiana)
- University of Portland Shiley School of Engineering (Portland, Oregon)
- University of St. Thomas School of Engineering (St. Paul, Minnesota)
- University of San Diego Shiley-Marcos School of Engineering (San Diego, California)
- Villanova University College of Engineering (Villanova, Pennsylvania)

== Catholic law schools ==
- Ave Maria School of Law (Naples, Florida)
- Barry University School of Law (Orlando, Florida)
- Boston College Law School (Newton, Massachusetts)
- Columbus School of Law (The Catholic University of America, Washington, D.C.)
- Creighton University School of Law (Omaha, Nebraska)
- DePaul University College of Law (Chicago, Illinois)
- Duquesne University School of Law (Pittsburgh, Pennsylvania)
- Fordham University School of Law (New York, New York)
- Georgetown University Law Center (Washington, D.C.)
- Gonzaga University School of Law (Spokane, Washington)
- Loyola Law School (Los Angeles, California)
- Loyola University Chicago School of Law (Chicago, Illinois)
- Loyola University New Orleans College of Law (New Orleans, Louisiana)
- Marquette University Law School (Milwaukee, Wisconsin)
- Notre Dame Law School (Notre Dame, Indiana)
- Pontifical Catholic University of Puerto Rico School of Law (Ponce, Puerto Rico)
- St. John's University School of Law (Jamaica, New York)
- Saint Louis University School of Law (St. Louis, Missouri)
- St. Mary's University School of Law (San Antonio, Texas)
- St. Thomas University School of Law (Miami, Florida)
- Santa Clara University School of Law (Santa Clara, California)
- Seattle University School of Law (Seattle, Washington)
- Seton Hall University School of Law (Newark, New Jersey)
- University of Dayton School of Law (Dayton, Ohio)
- University of Detroit Mercy (Detroit, Michigan)
- University of St. Thomas School of Law (Minneapolis, Minnesota)
- University of San Diego School of Law (San Diego, California)
- University of San Francisco School of Law (San Francisco, California)
- Villanova University School of Law (Villanova, Pennsylvania)

== Catholic medical schools ==
- Creighton University School of Medicine (Omaha, Nebraska)
- Duquesne University School of Osteopathic Medicine (Pittsburgh, Pennsylvania)
- Georgetown University School of Medicine (Washington, D.C.)
- Loyola University Chicago - Stritch School of Medicine (Maywood, Illinois)
- Marian University College of Osteopathic Medicine (Indianapolis, Indiana)
- Saint Louis University School of Medicine (St. Louis, Missouri)
- University of the Incarnate Word School of Osteopathic Medicine (San Antonio, Texas)
- -Pending- Benedictine College School of Osteopathic Medicine (Atchinson, Kansas)

== Catholic schools of professional psychology ==
- Divine Mercy University, Institute for the Psychological Sciences (Arlington, Virginia)

== Catholic Honor Society ==
- Delta Epsilon Sigma is the official national scholastic honor society for students, faculty, and alumni of colleges and universities with a Catholic tradition.

== Formerly Catholic universities and colleges ==
Schools that have ended or renounced their affiliation with the Church:

- Daemen University (Amherst, New York) – founded by the Sisters of St. Francis of Penance and Christian Charity
- Lynn University (Boca Raton, Florida) – formerly Marymount College of Boca Raton
- Manhattanville University (Purchase, New York) – ended affiliation with the Catholic Church in 1971
- Marist University (Poughkeepsie, New York) – ownership transferred to a lay board of trustees in 1969; was declared a secular institution in 2003
- Medical College of Wisconsin (Milwaukee, Wisconsin) – formerly Marquette University College of Medicine
- Mercy University (Dobbs Ferry, New York) – renounced affiliation with the Catholic Church in the 1970s
- Nazareth University (Rochester, New York) – founded by the Sisters of St. Joseph (SSJ) of Rochester
- New York Medical College (Valhalla, New York) – now part of Touro University System
- St. John Fisher University (Rochester, New York) – founded by the Basilian Fathers (CSB); renounced affiliation with the Catholic Church in 1968
- Stevenson University (Stevenson, Maryland) – formerly Villa Julie College; founded by the Sisters of Notre Dame de Namur in 1947; renounced affiliation with the Catholic Church in 1967
- Webster University (Webster Groves, Missouri) – founded by the Sisters of Loretto; renounced affiliation with the Catholic Church in 1967

== Defunct Catholic universities and colleges ==
- Anna Maria College (Paxton, Massachusetts)
- Barat College (Lake Forest, Illinois)
- Cabrini University (Radnor, Pennsylvania)
- Cardinal Cushing College (Brookline, Massachusetts)
- Cardinal Newman College (St. Louis, Missouri)
- Cardinal Stritch University (Milwaukee, Wisconsin) – founded by the Sisters of St. Francis of Assisi
- Claver College (Guthrie, Oklahoma)
- College of New Rochelle (New Rochelle, New York) – founded in 1904 as New York state's first Catholic college for women; merged into Mercy University (Dobbs Ferry, New York)
- College of St. Joseph (Rutland, Vermont)
- College of Saint Mary-of-the-Wasatch (Salt Lake City, Utah)
- College of Saint Rose (Albany, New York)
- College of Saint Teresa (Winona, Minnesota)
- College of Saint Thomas More (Fort Worth, Texas)
- College of Santa Fe (Santa Fe, New Mexico) – became secular as Santa Fe University of Art and Design, then closed
- Duchesne College (Omaha, Nebraska)
- Dunbarton College of the Holy Cross (Washington, D.C.)
- Fontbonne University (St. Louis, Missouri)
- Holy Family College (Manitowoc, Wisconsin)
- Holy Name College (Washington, D.C.)
- Holy Names University (Oakland, California)
- Immaculate Heart College (Los Angeles, California)
- Ladycliff College (Highland Falls, New York)
- Lexington College (Chicago, Illinois)
- Lourdes University (Sylvania, Ohio)
- Magdalen College of the Liberal Arts (Warner, New Hampshire)
- Marian Court College (Swampscott, Massachusetts)
- Mary Manse College (Toledo, Ohio) – active from 1922 to 1975, was operated by the Ursuline Order of nuns
- Marycrest College (Davenport, Iowa)
- Marygrove College (Detroit, Michigan)
- Marylhurst University (Portland, Oregon)
- Marymount California University (Rancho Palos Verdes, California)
- Marymount College (Salina, Kansas)
- Marymount College (Tarrytown, New York)
- Marymount Manhattan College (New York, New York) – founded by the Religious of the Sacred Heart of Mary; became secular, then merged with Northeastern University
- Mount Saint Mary College (Hooksett, New Hampshire)
- Notre Dame College (Manchester, New Hampshire)
- Notre Dame College (South Euclid, Ohio)
- Oblate College (Washington, D.C.)
- Ottumwa Heights College (Ottumwa, IA) - Founded by the Sisters of the Humility of Mary. Once defunct the campus later became the site of Indian Hills Community College.
- Presentation College (Aberdeen, South Dakota)
- St. Catharine College (St. Catharine, Kentucky)
- St. Gregory's University (Shawnee, Oklahoma)
- St. Mary of the Plains College (Dodge City, Kansas)
- St. Viator College (Bourbonnais, Illinois)
- Siena Heights University (Adrian, Michigan)
- Southern Benedictine College (Cullman, Alabama)
- Southern Catholic College (Dawsonville, Georgia)
- Trinity College of Vermont (Burlington, Vermont)
- University of Albuquerque (Albuquerque, New Mexico)
- Ursuline College (Pepper Pike, Ohio) – merged with Gannon University

== See also ==
- History of Catholic education in the United States
