= Aureta Thomollari =

Albanian American luxury consultant (born 1981)

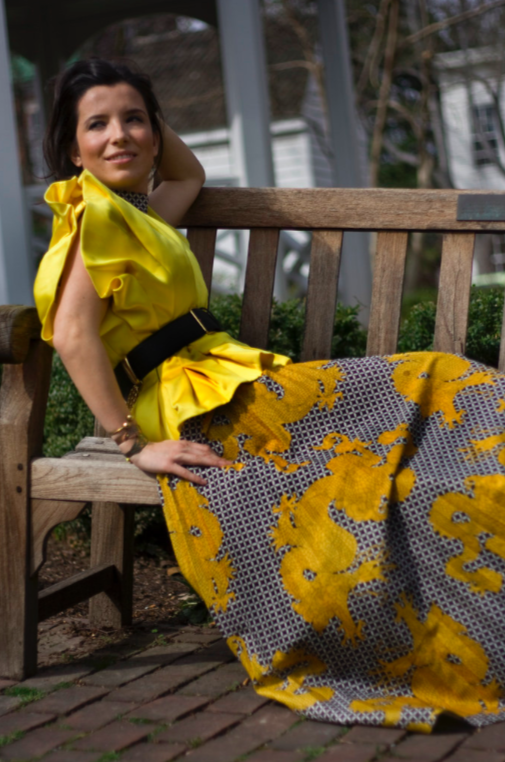
- Born: August 16, 1981 (age 44)
- Occupations: Creative director; socialite
- Known for: Fashion influencer and creative direction

Aureta Thomollari (born 16 August 1981) is an Albanian American creative director, art collector and luxury consultant. She was represented by NEXT Model Management in Los Angeles.

== Career ==
=== Los Angeles ===
Thomollari spent nearly a decade in Los Angeles, where she co-founded and erected the first Daniel Espinosa Jewelry store in the States.

=== Charitable work ===
Thomollari participated in Bulgari's Save the Children campaign with Rumi Neely, which supported the fashion house's philanthropic efforts in conjunction with the charitable organization.

== Recognition ==
She was recently chosen for the third year in a row by Washington Life Magazine as one of the 250 most influential Washingtonians under the age of 40, in their "Young and the Guest List."

The Washington Post recently recognized Aureta, for the second year in a row, in their quarterly style magazine, Fashion Washington, as one of six "Scene Stealers," and Washingtonian Magazine named her one of their "Style Setters" in 2010.

== Media coverage ==
In January 2011, she was on the cover of Anabel, Albania's highest-selling fashion magazine. In September 2011, she was named a Rag & Bone DC ambassador.Her closet was featured in a recent issue of Capitol File magazine.

She has been featured in SELF China, Marie Claire Belgium, Elle Bulgaria, Grazia India, MOJEH Saudi Arabia, Refinery29, Guest of a Guest, Washingtonian, Angeleno, NBC's The Feast etc. for her prominent personal style.

She recently appeared on NBC4 Washington

In February 2012, she was chosen by Net-A-Porter Magazine as one of the hottest blogs to bookmark for 2012.

== Personal life ==
Thomollari is a member of Delta Mu Delta and Delta Epsilon Sigma honor societies. She is of Albanian descent.
