= Juju Bae =

American author and podcaster (born 1992)

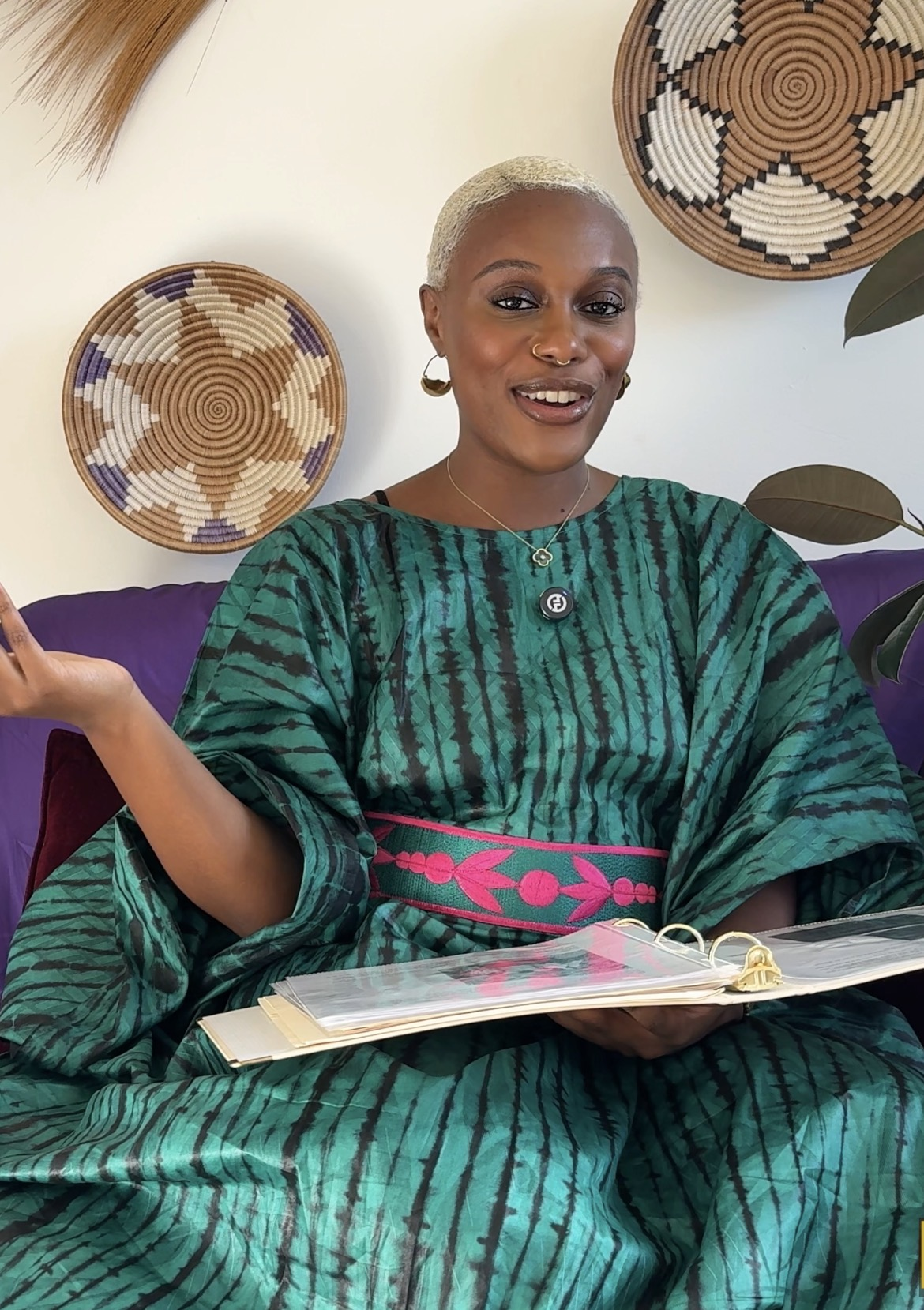
- Bae in 2026
- Born: 1992 (age 33–34); Baltimore, Maryland, U.S.
- Occupations: Oshun priest, spiritual healer, hoodoo woman, writer, podcaster
- Years active: 2018–present
- Known for: A Little Juju (podcast), "Living for the Dead" (reality tv)
- Notable work: The Book of Juju (2024)

Juju Bae (born 1992) is an African American author, spiritual educator, Osun priestess and podcaster. She uses her platform to help her listeners navigate the practice of African traditional religions. She is best known for her podcast A Little Juju, which was nominated for Best Religion and Spirituality Podcast at the 2020 iHeartRadio Podcast Awards. She is a main cast member on the Hulu series Living for the Dead. Bae released her debut book, The Book of Juju, on June 18, 2024, under Sterling Ethos.

== Career ==
Bae began her spiritual journey and practice of African traditional religions during adulthood, after she was directed by her ancestors. Beyoncé's visual album Lemonade, which includes imagery related to the Orishas, was another touchstone that helped her continue her study. She first began to practice the African American tradition of hoodoo in 2016, and later added the Yoruba practice of ifá in 2018.

Bae gained notability through her podcast, A Little Juju, which she launched in 2018 after she began to practice hoodoo. The podcast centers Juju's explorations of the connections between Black modern life and African traditional religions. In 2020, the podcast was nominated for Best Spirituality & Religion Podcast at the iHeartRadio Podcast Awards.

The name she uses professionally, Juju Bae, is a nod to the catch-all term "juju", which encompasses African medicine, spiritual practices and magic, and has negative connotations at times. One of her objectives is to demystify African traditional religions, which have been stigmatized by Abrahamic religions. Ancestral connection is a prominent feature of Bae's spiritual practice and education because it is a central tenet of many African traditional religions. As of 2023, Bae was working as a psychic, and communicates messages from the dead for her predominantly-Black clientele. She uses divination techniques as part of her practice.

In 2023, Bae appeared on the Hulu reality series Living for the Dead, where she and the other LGBTQ cast members use spiritual tools to assist ghosts and paranormal entities that haunt various locales around the United States.

Bae's debut book The Book of Juju: Africana Spirtuality for Healing, Liberation and Self-Discovery was released on June 18, 2024, under Sterling Ethos. She stated that her intention with the book was to answer many of the questions she is frequently asked, such as "What if I don't know my ancestors? What if I don't have gifts? What if I'm adopted? What if my ancestors weren't good people?". In a positive review, Publishers Weekly stated, "Throughout, she conveys the wide scope of the topic without losing sight of her focus on how readers can adapt African religious practices to seek joy, success, and ancestral connection in their own lives. Those looking to broaden their spiritual horizons will find plenty to celebrate".

== Personal life ==
Bae was born and raised in Beechfield, Baltimore, Maryland. She was raised Catholic. She graduated from Seton Keough High School in 2010. She received her bachelor's degree in psychology from Spelman College.

Bae is bisexual.

== Accolades ==
=== For A Little Juju ===
- 2020 – Nominee, iHeartRadio Podcast Awards, Best Religion and Spirituality Podcast
- 2024 – Winner, Signal Awards, Best Indie Podcast, Bronze
- 2024 – Winner, Signal Awards, Best Indie Podcast, Listener's Choice

== Works ==
=== Podcast ===
- 2018–present, A Little Juju, iHeartRadio

=== Book ===
- The Book of Juju: Africana Spirituality for Healing, Liberation, and Self-Discovery, 2024, United States, Sterling Ethos ISBN 978-1-4549-5128-5, 18, June 2024
