= Robert Magliola =

American philosopher

Roberto Rino Magliola (born 1940) is an Italian-American academic specializing in European hermeneutics and deconstruction, comparative philosophy, and inter-religious dialogue. He is retired from the National Taiwan University and Assumption University of Thailand.

== Career ==
Magliola received his doctorate in 1970 from Princeton University in comparative literature, with a dissertation in phenomenology and hermeneutics. He took up a position at Purdue University in 1969, and was promoted to professor in 1981. From 1983 to 1984, Magliola taught and researched at Tamkang University in Taiwan while on sabbatical from Purdue. In 1985, Magliola moved to Asia where he held posts in the interfaith graduate school of philosophy and religions at Assumption University (Thailand), where he was the professor of philosophy and religious studies; and at the National Taiwan University, where he held a distinguished chair in the graduate school of liberal arts.

In Asia, Magliola published writings on Buddhism and deconstruction. As a lay Carmelite (1982–present) [3], he also began to write both on the application of Derridean thought motifs to Catholic theology and on Catholic meditation, and made an invited presentation in 1999 on 'Catholic meditation in Tibetan Vajrayana form' for the Pontifical Council for Culture and the federation of Asian Bishops. In Thailand, Magliola researched Theravada Buddhism and in 1994, trained in Vipassanā-Satipatthana meditation (Wat Mahathat, Bangkok).

From 2002 to 2007, Magliola was a co-editor for volumes in the book series "seminars on culture and values" for the council for research in values and philosophy of the Catholic University of America. He is a co-editor (since 2008) of the DES Journal, the academic journal of Delta Epsilon Sigma. Magliola was a seminar associate (2002–2011) of the seminar in Buddhist studies at Columbia University, and studied (autumn 2010–summer 2012) the meditative mode of Ajaan Lee Dhammadharo at the downtown New York meditation community (Manhattan; vipassanā). From spring 2012, Magliola practiced at Villa Vangelo e Zen ("The Gospel and Zen"), in Desio, Lombardia, Italy, and in March 2013, received an official certificate from Vangelo e Zen which declares that he is qualified to teach meditation "as transmitted in Zen and in other Oriental forms" to "priests, religious, and laity of the Catholic Church," by "the spirituality of dialogue promoted by Vatican Council II."

== Jacques Derrida and Buddhism ==
Magliola is a specialist in European hermeneutics and deconstruction, in comparative philosophy, and in Buddhist – (Roman) Catholic dialogue. He has explored at length in Derrida on the Mend, 1984) possible intersections between Jacques Derrida's thought and Buddhism, especially Madhyamika Buddhism and its "founder," Nagarjuna:

- "As far as I know, Magliola is the first person to study Derrida from a Buddhist perspective, and he does this with a higher degree of speculative engagement than has been attained in similar studies of Nietzsche, Wittgenstein, and Bergson." Joseph S. O'Leary, in his review of Derrida on the Mend in Japanese Journal of Religious Studies, Vol. 12, No. 4, p. 362.
- "Since Robert Magliola's 1984 publication Derrida on the Mend, which involved his pioneering comparison of Derrida and Nagarjuna, ..." – Youru Wang, in his review of Youxuan Wang, Buddhism and Deconstruction: Towards a Comparative Semiotics, in Philosophy East and West, Vol. 55, No. 3 (July 2005)
- "It took Magliola, in Derrida on the Mend, to bring Nagarjuna and other Buddhist voices into the arena of the discourse on deconstruction, and the efforts of the academy to marginalize his work have been considerable." E. H. Jarow, "Zen Flesh, Bones, and Blood: Deconstructing Inter-Religious Dialogue," in Buddhisms and Deconstructions, ed. J.Y. Park, p. 228.

== Books ==
- Phenomenology and Literature (Purdue University Press, 1977, 2nd printing 1978), 208 pp.
- Derrida on the Mend (Purdue University Press, 1984; 2nd edition, 1986), 238 pp. Reprint, Purdue University Press, 2000–2011, 2013-.
- On Deconstructing Life-Worlds: Buddhism, Christianity, Culture (Scholars Press, American Academy of Religion, 1997; Oxford University Press, 2000), 202 pp.
- Facing Up to Real Doctrinal Difference: How Some Thought-Motifs From Derrida Can Nourish the Catholic-Buddhist Encounter (Angelico Press, 2014), 224 pp.

== See also ==
- J. Hillis Miller
- East Asian Mādhyamaka
- Postmodern literature
- Lay theologian
- American philosophy
- List of American philosophers
- List of Italian Americans
- Continental philosophers
- Existential philosophy
