= The Keepers =

2017 American documentary series

- Promotional poster
- Genre: Documentary
- Based on: Murder of Catherine Cesnik
- Directed by: Ryan White
- Country of origin: United States
- No. of seasons: 1
- No. of episodes: 7

Production
- Executive producers: Ryan White; Jessica Hargrave; Josh Braun; Ben Cotner; Jason Spingarn-Koff; Lisa Nishimura; Matthew Goldberg; Brandon Carroll
- Production locations: Baltimore, Maryland
- Cinematography: David Jacobson; John Benam
- Editors: Kate Amend; Mark Harrison; Helen Kearns
- Production companies: Film 45; Tripod Media

Original release
- Network: Netflix
- Release: May 19, 2017

The Keepers is a seven-episode American documentary series that explores the unsolved murder of nun Catherine Cesnik in 1969.

== Overview ==
Catherine Cesnik taught English and drama at Baltimore's all-girls Archbishop Keough High School, and her former students believe that there was a cover-up by authorities after she suspected that a priest at the high school, A. Joseph Maskell, was guilty of sexually abusing students. The series was directed by Ryan White and released on Netflix in 2017.

== Cast ==
- Gemma Hoskins – former student and investigator
- Abbie Fitzgerald Schaub – former student and investigator
- Joseph Maskell – former priest and counselor
- Jean Hargadon Wehner (a.k.a. Jane Doe) – former student
- Teresa Lancaster (a.k.a. Jane Roe) – former student
- Randy Lancaster – Teresa Lancaster's husband
- Donna Von Den Bosch – former student
- Juliana Farrell – former student
- Deb Silcox – former student
- Lil Hughes – former student
- Chris Centofanti – former student
- Mary Spence – former student
- Marilyn Cesnik Radakovic – Sister Catherine's sister
- Gerry Koob – former priest and Sister Catherine's former boyfriend
- Tom Nugent – journalist and writer for the Baltimore City Paper
- Bob Erlandson – journalist
- Beverly Wallace – attorney for former students
- Alan Horn – investigator
- John Barnold – former captain, Baltimore City Police Department
- James Scannell – former captain, Baltimore County Police Department
- Brian Schwaab – former detective, Baltimore City Police Department
- Gary Childs – detective, Baltimore County Police
- Sharon A. H. May – former State's Attorney for Baltimore City
- Edgar Davidson – possible suspect in the murder of sister Catherine
- Deborah Yohn – Davidson's niece, who suspects her uncle's involvement in the murders based on anecdotes from her aunt, who is referred to as "Margaret" in the series.
- Sharon Schmidt – daughter of Ronnie Schmidt and niece of Billy Schmidt, who suspects the involvement of both men in the murders.
- Barbara Schmidt – mother of Sharon Schmidt, former wife of Ronnie Schmidt and sister-in-law to Billy Schmidt, who suspects the involvement of her husband and brother-in-law in the murders.
- C. T. Wilson – Maryland state delegate
- Charles Franz – former student at St. Clement's Church
- Werner Spitz, MD – forensic pathologist

== Episodes ==
No.	Title	Original release date
1	"The Murder"	May 19, 2017
Hoskins and Schaub investigate the disappearances and deaths of Sister Cathy Cesnik and Joyce Malecki in November 1969.
2	"The School"	May 19, 2017
The episode reveals allegations of abuse at Archbishop Keough High School, and the personal stories of "Jane Doe" (Jean Hargadon Wehner) and other women at the school. Wehner discusses the day after the murder that Father Maskell took her to see the body of Sister Catherine Cesnik in nearby Lansdowne, Maryland.
3	"The Revelation"	May 19, 2017
In 1992, Wehner faces the abuse she endured at Keough, allegedly at the hands of Father Maskell and other men he knew (including someone known as "Brother Bob"), as well as the threat that frightened her into silence.
4	"The Burial"	May 19, 2017
In 1994, two former students (Wehner and Teresa Lancaster) file a lawsuit against Maskell, the gynecologist they allege witnessed sexual assaults by Maskell, the Archdiocese of Baltimore, and the School Sisters of Notre Dame, but face intimidation from their lawyers, as well as their psychiatric experts who doubt repressed memories. The lawsuit is thrown out.
5	"The Suspects"	May 19, 2017
A tip line created by the group yields two compelling suspects (Edgar Davidson and Billy Schmidt) who may have been involved in Sister Catherine's murder.
6	"The Web"	May 19, 2017
Sister Catherine's sister, Marilyn Cesnik Radakovic, joins the case and discloses additional information about the days leading up to Cathy's disappearance.
7	"The Conclusion"	May 19, 2017
The season finale details prior sexual abuse by Father Maskell at Saint Clement's Church that was known by the Archdiocese, and the legislative efforts to overturn the statute of limitations in Maryland.

== Reception ==
=== Critical response ===
The review aggregator Rotten Tomatoes gives the series an approval rating of 97% based on 32 reviews, with an average rating of 8.47/10. The site's critical consensus reads, "The Keepers draws on riveting, real-life terror to expose long-buried secrets—and tells an inspiring, brilliantly assembled story along the way." On Metacritic the film has a weighted average score of 78 out of 100 based on 11 critics, indicating "generally favorable" reviews.

Pilot Viruet of Vice wrote of the series, "It's harrowing and upsetting, and it will haunt you for a long time, which is part of what makes it necessary viewing." In Time magazine, Daniel D'Addario compared The Keepers with another Netflix true-crime series, Making a Murderer, stating that The Keepers does not lead its viewers to a definite conclusion about what happened. "While Sister Cathy Cesnik's death remains a mystery, its aftereffects include both crushing heartbreak and, for the amateur sleuths who seek to crack her case, a sense of making a difference... This isn't just more respectful to the victim than other true-crime stories, with their breathless delight at new clues. It's also more effective." According to Jack Seale in The Guardian, "Where other true crime hits have followed a linear chronology, The Keepers hops between 1969, the 1990s and today, striking a fine balance between narrative structure – a wow moment at the end of every episode – and respect for a subject that doesn’t need or deserve sensationalism."

=== Reaction from the Catholic Church ===
The Archdiocese of Baltimore declined when asked by Netflix producers to comment on sexual misconduct allegations within the church. Later, the Archdiocese responded to the series by adding a FAQ page to its website, in which it stated allegations that the archdiocese knew of Maskell's sexual abuse prior to 1992 were false speculation.
