= Delta Epsilon Sigma =

American honor society at Catholic colleges

- ΔΕΣ
- Founded: 1939; 87 years ago Kansas City, Missouri, US
- Type: Honor
- Affiliation: ACHS
- Status: Active
- Emphasis: Roman Catholic
- Scope: National
- Motto: Dei Epitattein Sophon "It is the missing of wise person to put order"
- Colors: Gold and Maroon
- Publication: Delta Epsilon Sigma Journal
- Chapters: 119
- Members: 90,000+ lifetime
- Headquarters: c/o Neumann University; Arts & Sciences BACH 305; One Neumann Drive; Ashton, Pennsylvania 19014; United States
- Website: www.deltaepsilonsigma.org

Delta Epsilon Sigma (ΔΕΣ) is an American scholastic honor society that was established for students of Catholic universities and colleges. It was established at Loras College in Dubuque, Iowa in 1939. Delta Epsilon Sigma has 119 chapters across the United States.

== History ==
In October 1938, Reverend E. A. Fitzgerald, dean of studies at Loras College in Dubuque, Iowa, surveyed his peers to see if there was interest in establishing a scholastic honor society for students at Catholic universities and colleges. He presented his findings to the College and University Department of the National Catholic Education Association (N.C.E.A.) in 1939. This led to the creation of a 32-member Committee of Founders, with Fitzgerald as the chair.

The committee selected the name Delta Epsilon Sigma and created a motto, insignia, and constitution. This work was shared with all Catholic colleges and universities before a Constitutional Convention in Kansas City, MIssouri on March 29, 1940. During this convention, a provisional constitution was adopted, and 32 chapters of Delta Epsilon Sigma were chartered. Delta Epsilon Sigma was established as a national scholastic honor society for male and female students at Catholic universities and colleges. Fitzgerald was selected as its national secretary-treasurer.

In 1947, the society began publishing the Delta Epsilon Sigma Bulletin, now the Delta Epsilon Sigma Journal. In 1962, it had chartered 82 chapters and initiated more than 7,000 members. Delta Epsilon Sigma joined the Association of College Honor Societies in 1969. It changed its constitution, bylaws and induction rituals on May 28, 1976. By 2012, it had 53 active chapters, one alumni club, 2,118 active members, and 90,347 total initiates.

The society holds an annual National Undergraduate Writing Competition and a Fellowship Competition. It also presents the J. Patrick Lee Prize in Ethics, the Distinguished Lecturers Award, and the National Undergraduate Student Award.

As of 2024, Delta Epsilon Sigma has 119 chapters in the United States. Its national headquarters is in Ashton, Pennsylvania. It is governed by an executive committee that is elected at its annual convention.

== Symbols ==
Delta Epsilon Sigma's colors are gold and maroon. Its membership badge is a key with the Greek letters ΔΕΣ, a lamb of the catacombs in the lower left corner, and the Greek letters ΧΡ in the upper right corner.

Its publication is the Delta Epsilon Sigma Journal.

Delta Epsilon Sigma is the abbreviation of the initial Greek Letters of the Motto: Dei Epitattein Sophon "It is the missing of wise person to put order" into knowledge.

== Membership ==
Membership is by invitation sent from the college or university's chapter. Undergraduate students must be ranked in the top twenty percent of their class and have completed at least half of the credit requirements for their baccalaureate degree. Graduate students must also have a minimum GPA of 3.5 on a 4.0 scale and have completed at least half of the credits for their degree. Candidates must also have a record of dedication to intellectual activity and community service. Local chapters may also elect faculty, administrations, and staff for membership; alumni are eligible for membership if the previously met the requirements of membership or graduate cum laude.

== Chapters ==
As of 2024, Delta Epsilon Sigma had chartered 119 chapters in the United States.

== Notable members ==
- Bernadette Armiger, Roman Catholic nun, nurse and academic
- Helen Dyer, biochemist
- John Robert Greene, historian
- Dixon Hearne, educator and writer
- Robert Magliola, philosopher
- Aureta Thomollari, luxury consultant
- Don Wooten, Illinois Senate

== See also ==
- Honor cords
- Honor society
