= Seton Keough High School =

Private, all-girls school in United States

Location
- 1201 Caton Avenue; Baltimore, Maryland 21227; United States; 39°16′9″N 76°39′58″W

Information
- Type: Private, all-girls
- Religious affiliation: Roman Catholic
- Established: 1965
- Closed: June 2017
- President: Donna Bridickas
- Grades: 9–12
- Student to teacher ratio: 12:1
- Colors: Forest Green & Grey
- Slogan: Sending Forth Women of Honor
- Athletics: 12 varsity sports, 6 JV
- Mascot: Gators
- Accreditation: Middle States Association of Colleges and Schools
- Dean of Academics: Ms. Lauren Urban

Seton Keough High School was an all-girls college preparatory Catholic high school in Baltimore, Maryland. It was located in the Archdiocese of Baltimore at 1201 Caton Avenue. It was founded in 1988 after the merging of two schools, Archbishop Keough High School and Seton High School. The combined school closed in June 2017.

== Sexual abuse ==
In 2016, the Archdiocese of Baltimore confirmed that settlements totaling $472,000 had been paid to 16 past students of the school who were sexually abused by Fr Joseph Maskell, a priest at the school from 1967 to 1975.

In 1969, a popular English and drama teacher at Archbishop Keough, Sister Cathy Cesnik, was found murdered in the outskirts of the city of Baltimore. Her murder was never solved and is the central subject of the 2017 Netflix documentary web series The Keepers. The abuses by priests at the school were also featured in the documentary in relation to the potential cover-up of the murder of Cesnik, who shortly before her death had been told by female students of the abuse. The documentary cited that over a hundred former students came forward to provide testimony on rape, sexual misconduct, and molestation.

== Closure ==
Emblem of the former Archbishop Keough High School

On October 26, 2016, the Archdiocese of Baltimore announced that the school would close in June 2017. The decision was reached as a result of an 18-month study of 22 Catholic schools in and around Baltimore. Conducted by architectural firm Ayers Saint Gross, location intelligence firm DataStory and education design firm Fielding Nair International, the study examined school facilities, enrollment, and projected demographic data and potential areas of growth. The study identified three schools for closure due to under-enrollment and/or facility condition: in addition to Seton Keough High School the list included two elementary schools John Paul Regional Catholic School in Woodlawn and Thomas Aquinas Elementary School in Hampden. Furthermore, the Holy Angels Catholic School, sharing facilities with Seton Keough, was relocated. The buildings of Seton Keough have subsequently been torn down and the site now houses a City/Logistics warehouse and miscellaneous offices.

== Notable alumnae ==
- Theresa Andrews, Olympic swimmer
- Sister Bernadette Armiger, nursing administrator and mental health advocate.
- Elizabeth Bobo, former Howard County executive, member of the Maryland House of Delegates
- Asya Bussie, professional basketball player for Minnesota Lynx
- Juju Bae, witch and spiritual healer

== See also ==
- National Catholic Educational Association
