= Utica, Maryland =

- Unincorporated community
- Location in Maryland
- Coordinates: 39°31′34″N 77°23′38″W
- Country: United States
- State: Maryland
- County: Frederick County
- Elevation: 367 ft (112 m)
- Time zone: UTC-5 (Eastern)
  - Summer (DST): UTC-4 (EDT)
- Area code: 410 and 443
- GNIS feature ID: 591462

Utica, also known as Utica Mills, is an unincorporated community located in Frederick County, Maryland, United States, at the intersection of Old Frederick Road and Lenhart Road.

It is home to St. Paul's Evangelical Lutheran Church.

The Utica Covered Bridge, also known as the Utica Mills Covered Bridge, is located nearby.

== History ==
During the Civil War, the 18th Regiment Massachusetts Volunteer Infantry arrived at the outskirts of Utica on Tuesday, July 7, 1863.

Dr. George F. Smith, one of the first druggists to serve Coca-Cola, and founder of the Rosebud Perfume Company in Woodsboro, Maryland, taught school in Utica for five years, before becoming a druggist in 1902.
