= Baltimore County Police Department =

Primary law enforcement agency for Baltimore County, Maryland, US

- Patch of Baltimore County Police Department
- Abbreviation: BCoPD

Agency overview
- Formed: April 11, 1874; 152 years ago
- Employees: 2,492

Jurisdictional structure
- Operations jurisdiction: Maryland, United States
- Map of Baltimore County Police Department's jurisdiction
- Area: 612 mi
- Population: 855,000 (2020)
- General nature: Local civilian police

Operational structure
- Headquarters: Public Safety Building, 700 East Joppa Road; Towson, Maryland 21286; 39°24′0.6″N 76°35′23″W
- Officers: 1,824
- Civilian employees: 244
- Agency executive: Robert McCullough, Chief of Police

Facilities
- Precincts: 10: 1-Wilkens; 2-Woodlawn; 3- Franklin; 4- Pikesville; 6-Towson; 7-Cockeysville; 8-Parkville; 9-White Marsh; 11-Essex; 12- Dundalk
- Detention Centers: 1
- Boats: 3
- Helicopters: 3
- Dogs: 28

Website
- Official Website

The Baltimore County Police Department is the primary law enforcement agency for Baltimore County, Maryland. They have been accredited by Commission on Accreditation for Law Enforcement Agencies (C.A.L.E.A.) since 1984.

== Police chief ==
The current Chief of the county police department is Chief Robert McCullough.

In March 2017, James Johnson retired. Terrence B. Sheridan returned to take over control of the police department until his departure in June 2019, when Melissa Hyatt assumed control of the police after being appointed by the County Executive, Johnny Olszewski.

When Melissa Hyatt left the agency, Dennis Delp was named the interim Chief until Robert McCullough, who had retired from the agency at the rank of Colonel, was re-hired as Chief of Police.

== History ==
The Baltimore County Police Department was established by the General Assembly of Maryland on April 11, 1874. The Maryland state legislature authorized the Board of County Commissioners for Baltimore County "to appoint such number of policemen as they may deem necessary, for the better protection of persons and property." On June 17, 1874, the County Commissioners divided the two mile (3 km) portion of the county bordering the Baltimore City boundary into five districts and appointed the first police force. Officers were appointed to one year terms. In 1878, County Commissioners were authorized to build their first station house at Waverly. The Canton Station was added a year later. New stations would be added and rebuilt in 1886, 1891, 1892, 1920, 1927, 1928, 1943, 1954, 1955, 1961, 1962, 1965, 1969, 1973, 1985, 1987, 1991, 2001, 2004, 2005, 2006, 2007 and 2016.

In 1883, a new position, "Marshal of Police", was created, and Charles O. Kemp was appointed to the office. This new position consolidated the responsibility and control of the police force under one person, instead of individual chiefs for each police district.

In 1888, a 17-square-mile (44 km^{2}) portion of Baltimore County was annexed by Baltimore City. The number of officers in the Baltimore County Police Department was cut from 33 to 10 as officers and station houses were absorbed into the Baltimore City Police Department on the western and northern "precincts" adjacent to the City. The heavily industrial and residential communities on the east such as Highlandtown and Canton voted against annexation in the referendum and stayed in the county until 1919, when another 40 square miles (100 km^{2}) of suburban and rural Baltimore County was annexed, causing the B.C.o.P.D. to lose 34 of its 43 officers to the city police force.

In 1902, the Maryland General Assembly passed an act aimed at ensuring that officers appointed to the Baltimore County police force would be qualified. The act required every applicant to provide their full name and age, location of birth, and prior occupations in the last two years, among other details. Applicants could not be younger than 21 years old or older than 45. It also required four "reputable" citizens of the county to speak of the applicant's character and affirm that they would be "fit for service".

The first woman was appointed to the county police force in 1913 as a matron. Two other women, Eva Aldridge and Ruth Jones were appointed to summer positions as Special Officers to protect young girls at the river resorts along the Patapsco River, Back River and Middle River in the eastern part of the county along the Chesapeake Bay. B.C.o.P.D.'s first female officer to become a Major was appointed in 1976, and in 1995, the force had its first female Colonel.

The B.C.o.P.D.'s Bureau of Identification was established in 1927. Its main purpose was to classify fingerprints and photographs which would serve as an aid in solving crime. In 1940, a plain clothes unit was established and trained to handle criminal investigations.

In 1947, a fire at the B.C.o.P.D.'s Towson Station killed two prisoners being held in the lockup, despite efforts by officers to pull the bars out of the windows using a tow truck.

In 1952, the first Black/African-American patrol officers, Armond Elliott, Frances Jackson, and James Johnson, were appointed to the county force, and in 1976, the first female officer was promoted to the rank of Major. Additionally, a Black officer was promoted to the rank of Lieutenant for the first time in 1981, and the first Black officer to become Colonel was promoted in 1995.

B.C.o.P.D.'s Police-Community Relations Council was established in 1983, and, in 1984, the first Child Abuse Unit in the state of Maryland was established in Baltimore County. In the same year, the B.Co.P.D. became the first major department in the country to be awarded national accreditation. The department's Citizen's Police Academy was developed in 1993.

In 2002, B.C.o.P.D. joined the CODIS database allowing it to share and access DNA information to identify suspects. In the same year, it was re-accredited by the Commission on Accreditation of Law Enforcement Agencies (CALEA). Additionally, the computer crime unit and its mission were expanded and renamed the Digital and Multimedia Evidence Unit.

In 2006, the Gang Enforcement Team was created to fight growth of gangs in the County, and in 2007, the Violent Crime Unit was created to investigate non-fatal shootings and other serious assaults.

== Criticism ==
The Baltimore County Police Department has faced criticism, mainly due to its lack of diversity and the history of its officers fatally harming citizens.

White people are the majority in the force, accounting for 80%, whereas the percentage of White people in Baltimore County as a whole is 57%.

== Precincts ==
Formerly known as "police stations", since the 1970s Baltimore County has been divided into ten police precincts. Number 5 is intentionally skipped and will be used if the department needs to expand at a later time. Most recently, this happened in 2006 when Precinct 4 opened in Pikesville and Precinct 3 moved from Garrison to Franklin. Former Precincts 10 (Fullerton) and 13 (Edgemere) were absorbed into Precincts 9 and 12, respectively.

In 2016, Dundalk personnel were transferred from their facility on Merritt Blvd to a converted facility on Eastern Avenue in the Eastwood neighborhood.

In 2022, new projects were started by local construction contractors regarding a design and feasibility study on building new state of the art police facilities replacing the Wilkins and Essex stations. In 2023, these designs were finalized. The new Wilkins station is set to break ground sometime in 2026-2027, and the Essex station soon afterwards. Both stations are planned to be constructed on the same locations as the existing stations, with Essex planned to incorporate the existing basement/foundation area.

The final aging facility, Precinct 7 Cockeysville is also slated for a replacement. However, no formal announcement has been made as of early 2026. Additionally, the SOD complex located in Dundalk at the old North Point Junior High School dates back to the 1950s. Original plans to move the SOD units to a new facility in Reisterstown, Maryland have been placed on hold. No new plans for a new facility to replace the aging SOD complex are currently known.

Current stand-alone facilities used by the Baltimore County Police Department are as follows:

- Precinct 1 - Wilkens (Arbutus, Baltimore Highlands, Catonsville area)
- Precinct 2 - Woodlawn
- Precinct 3 - Franklin (Owings Mills, Reisterstown area)
- Precinct 4 - Pikesville
- Precinct 6 - Towson
- Precinct 7 - Cockeysville
- Precinct 8 - Parkville
- Precinct 9 - White Marsh
- Precinct 11 - Essex
- Precinct 12 - Dundalk
- SOD (K9, SWAT) - Dundalk, located at the old Precinct 12 facility. (North Point Junior High School prior to police use)
- Marine and Aviation - Martin State Airport, Essex, Maryland.
- Command staff and investigative units - HQ, Joppa Rd, Towson, Maryland

== Fleet ==
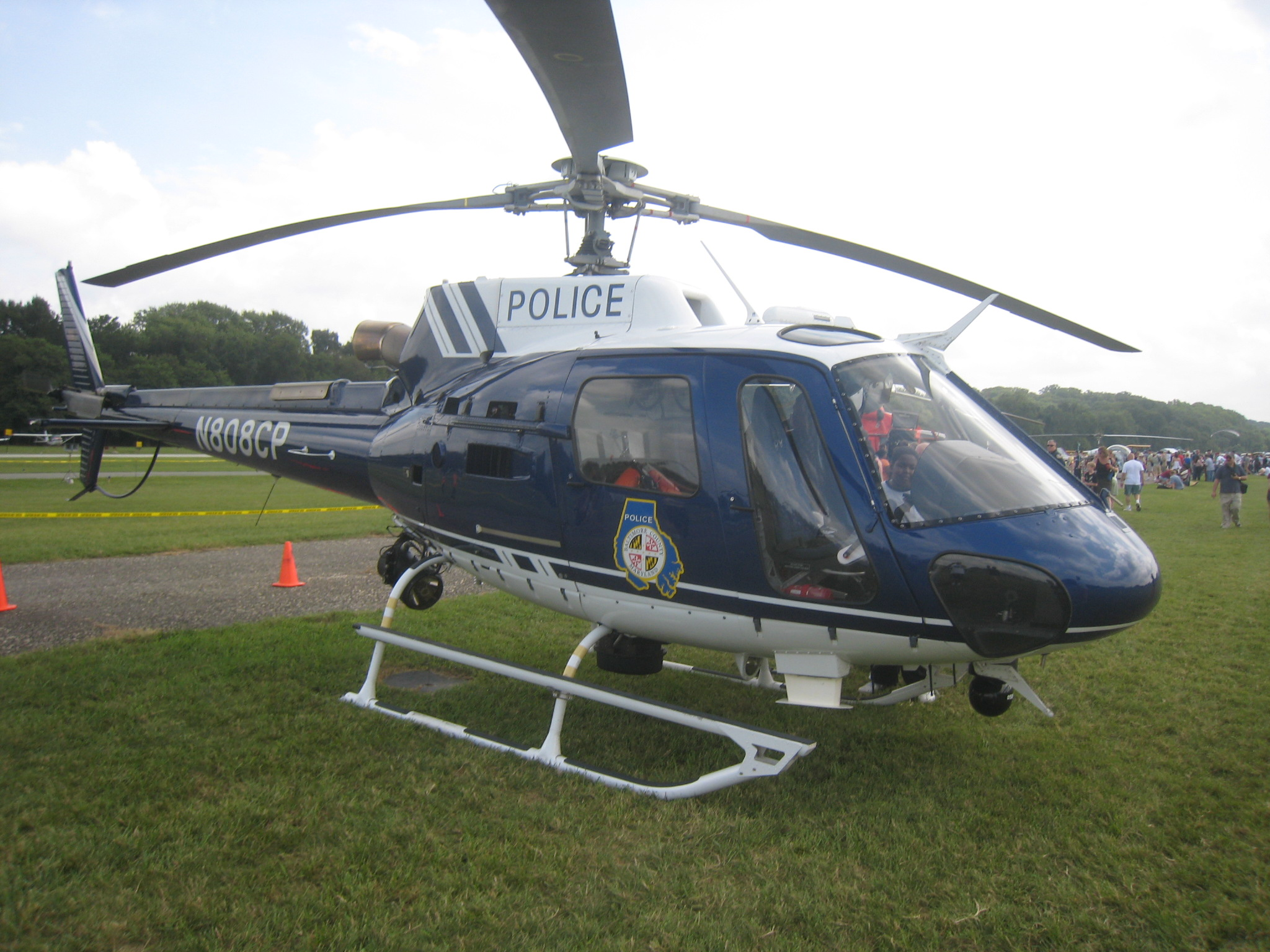
Baltimore County Police Eurocopter AS350 at the famous historic College Park Airport's 100th Anniversary in College Park, Prince George's County.

The primary patrol vehicles used are the Ford Taurus, Ford Interceptor Utility and some remaining Crown Victorias. Other specialized units utilize a combination of Ford Explorers or other non-descript vehicles, depending on the unit. SWAT utilize F250s and some support vans, K9 uses Chevy Tahoes while the Marine Unit has a few Ford F250s in use. Chevrolet vans are used for prisoner transport and the Commercial Vehicle unit. Motorcycle units previously rode the iconic Harley-Davidson Road King, but have recently transitioned to new modern BMW motorcycles. The department uses three Eurocopter AS350B3 helicopters, one of which was recently replaced with a newer model.

In early 2014, the department announced that they would begin to phase out the aging & discontinued Ford Crown Victoria with new Ford Taurus police interceptors. Beginning sometime between fall 2018 and early 2019, Baltimore County Police began to replace remaining Crown Victorias and older Tauruses with the Ford Explorer Police Interceptor Utility.

The new Explorers first appeared on the street in early 2019 and combined with the 2020+ model year, the Explorer now makes up the majority of the patrol fleet. Additionally, the department has also begun trials on a take home vehicle program for patrol officers to add an incentive commonly seen in surrounding agencies for retention benefits. In September 2023, the K-9 unit obtained enough vehicles for their handlers to take their vehicles to and from work which further increases the safety and security of their canines while transporting them to and from home.

New for Baltimore County, patrol vehicles are now being equipped with Soundoff Signal lighting equipment which include "cruise lights”, the steady burning red and blue lights on the light bars commonly seen on Baltimore City, MDTA and MSP vehicles. This addition is to further allow officers to maintain high visibility in areas prone to criminal activity. These lights can be turned on and off at the operators discretion. Vehicles are also being equipped with BluePRINT enabled systems which allow vehicles in close proximity to sync flash patterns, provide additional lighting functions and provide further safety to officers on the street.

== Weapons ==
The primary duty firearm is the Glock 17 chambered in 9mm issued with Ameriglo 3 dot night sights, and a TLR-7 weapon mounted light. The Remington 870 shotgun is issued to every marked patrol car, except specialized units like K9, SROs and the Traffic units/Crash Team to name a few. Axon T7 Tasers, Less Lethal beanbag shotguns and AR-15 patrol rifles are issued to some specifically trained officers. All officers are issued OC spray and an ASP baton. Officers wear Axon Body 4 Body Cameras and are issued phones linked to them.

The 870s, some of which date back to the 1960s, are slated for a replacement and/or upgrade. In 2023, the agency chose the Benelli M4 to replace the aging 870. The conversion was completed in 2024-2025.

In October 2018, after significant review of the performance and reliability history of the FNS-40LS, the Baltimore County Police Department will be transitioning to the Glock 17 chambered in 9mm starting January 2019 and span over a two month transition period.

Prior to the FNS-40LS officers were armed with the SIG Pro SP2340 in .40 S&W, prior to the SP2340 was the SIG-Sauer P226, after the transition in the 1990s from S&W Model 10 Revolvers.

== Rank structure and insignia ==
The Baltimore County Police Department rank structure is as listed:

Rank	Insignia
Chief Of Police	
Colonel	
Major	
Captain	
Lieutenant	
Sergeant	
Corporal	
Police Officer First Class	
Police Officer, Recruit and Cadet	

== See also ==
- List of law enforcement agencies in Maryland
