= Julian Lewis (disambiguation) =

Julian Lewis (born 1951) is a British politician.

Julian Lewis can also refer to:

- Julian Lewis (biologist) (1946–2014), English biologist
- Julian Edward Roosevelt Lewis (1960–2020), American carpenter, victim of killing of Julian Lewis
- Julian Lewis Jones (born 1968), Welsh actor
- Julian Lewis (American football) (born 2007), American football player
