= List of killings by law enforcement officers in the United States, June 2021 =

This is a list of people reported killed by non-military law enforcement officers in the United States in June 2021, whether in the line of duty or not, and regardless of reason or method. The listing documents the occurrence of a death, making no implications regarding wrongdoing or justification on the part of the person killed or officer involved. Killings are arranged by date of the incident that caused death. Different death dates, if known, are noted in the description. The table below lists 127 people.

== June 2021 ==
Date	Name (age) of deceased	Race of deceased	Location	Description
2021-06-30	Faler Fabian (49)	Pacific Islander	Tamuning, Guam	An off duty officer shot Fabian after a confrontation outside his apartment. According to investigators, a different man ran at a Guam Police Department officer's car with a pair of machetes, while Fabian threw a beer can and banged on the vehicle. The officer then exited his car and fired, shooting Fabian. A pocketknife was recovered from the scene.
2021-06-30	Joseph Lee Humbles (29)	Black	Atlanta, Georgia	
2021-06-30	Jeremy Nelson (33)	White	Florence, Kentucky	
2021-06-30	John Hayden Inabinet (51)	White	St. Matthews, South Carolina	
2021-06-29	Larry Hunt (58)	White	Bayard, Nebraska	
2021-06-29	Philip Sanders (32)	White	Corpus Christi, Texas	
2021-06-28	Soobleej Kaub Hawj (35)	Asian	Siskiyou County, California	Hawj, from Kansas City, Kansas, was shot and killed after he allegedly fired at police while attempting to enter an area evacuated due to wildfires. It is unknown if there is bodycam footage of the shooting.
2021-06-28	Jerome Barber (59)	Black	Azusa, California	
2021-06-28	Robert Alire	Hispanic	Commerce City, Colorado	
2021-06-28	Christopher Garcia (26)	Hispanic	Los Angeles, California	
2021-06-28	Name Withheld	Unknown race	Hemet, California	
2021-06-28	Tristan Trevino (24)	Black	Corpus Christi, Texas	
2021-06-27	Oscar Najera (25)	Hispanic	Roswell, New Mexico	
2021-06-27	Stephen Winder (39)	White	Graham, Texas	
2021-06-27	Nicole Dechant (29)	White	Plainville, Kansas	
2021-06-26	Roberto Acosta-Reyes (61)	Hispanic	Abilene, Texas	
2021-06-26	Don Crowson (37)	Unknown race	Texarkana, Arkansas	
2021-06-25	Dwayne Michael Fields (34)	White	Fife, Washington	
2021-06-25	Reginald Ray Hansen (75)	Unknown race	Grand Junction, Colorado	
2021-06-25	Michael Anthony Frederick (54)	White	McDonald, Tennessee	
2021-06-25	David Leon Fann (24)	White	Lander, Wyoming	
2021-06-25	Dennis Delgado (60)	White	Kansas City, Kansas	
2021-06-25	Albert Wayne Finnie Jr. (22)	Black	College Station, Texas	
2021-06-25	Dimitri Lanahan (23)	White	Fairbanks, Alaska	
2021-06-24	Chad Necessary (48)	White	Washington, North Carolina	
2021-06-24	Michael Ray Townsend (40)	White	Portland, Oregon	
2021-06-24	Gary Deering (74)	White	Greenfield, Missouri	
2021-06-24	Ted Frank Tippy (52)	White	Monroe, Georgia	
2021-06-24	Steven Jesse Dylan Thompson (29)	White	Auburn, Georgia	
2021-06-24	Abraham Torres Meza (30)	Hispanic	Bakersfield, California	
2021-06-24	David Ronald Bridgette (45)	White	Iron River, Michigan	
2021-06-24	Yonatan Aguilera (40)	Hispanic	Cumming, Georgia	
2021-06-24	William Dean Hewitt (54)	White	Whiteville, North Carolina	
2021-06-24	David Bridgette (45)	White	Iron River, Michigan	
2021-06-23	Earl Fitzgerald Hunter (40)	Black	Greenville, South Carolina	Wanted for a 2020 shooting, a warrant task force entered Hunter's home and shot him dead when he allegedly pulled a gun during a struggle.
2021-06-23	Hunter Brittain (17)	White	Cabot, Arkansas	Brittain was shot by a sheriff's deputy after being pulled over. Police have released few details of the shooting, but a witness says Brittain was shot when he went to grab a blue oil jug to put behind his truck's tires to prevent it from hitting the deputy's vehicle.
2021-06-23	Frederick Virgil Holder	Black	Norwalk, California	A police helicopter observed Holder driving erratically in a stolen utility van. When police ground units attempted to pull Holder's vehicle over, he continued to drive "less than a mile" before stopping. Holder was shot dead when he allegedly pointed an L-shaped object at police—later identified as a butane lighter with a handle—as they approached his vehicle.
2021-06-23	Raymond Loftin (36)	Unknown race	Fontana, California	
2021-06-23	Robert Alan Blackburn (39)	White	Walnut, Mississippi	
2021-06-23	Francisco Javier Lino-Gutierrez (29)	Hispanic	Santa Fe, New Mexico	
2021-06-23	Michael Lee Gerhart (22)	White	Surprise, Arizona	
2021-06-23	Jason Roybal (32)	White	Santa Fe, New Mexico	
2021-06-22	De'Shon Hill (39)	Black	Luray, Virginia	Hill held hostages at gunpoint at a convenience store, and refused to comply with repeated commands to drop his weapon and leave the building. Hill was shot dead when he allegedly emerged through the store's front doors with a long gun pointed at police.
2021-06-22	Michael Wolski (57)	White	New Berlin, Wisconsin	
2021-06-22	Willie T. Salazar (33)	Hispanic	Murray, Utah	
2021-06-22	Noah Sharp (26)	White	De Soto, Missouri	
2021-06-21	Virgil Lee Taylor (31)	White	Hamilton, Michigan	
2021-06-21	Alexander Matthew Collins (27)	White	Covington, Georgia	
2021-06-21	Travis Parham Jr. (19)	Black	Memphis, Tennessee	
2021-06-21	Wallace Morris (42)	Black	Memphis, Tennessee	
2021-06-20	Mickey Ray Rice (31)	White	Robbinsville, North Carolina	
2021-06-20	Dario Dominguez (25)	Hispanic	Kansas City, Kansas	
2021-06-26	Nathan Allen (28)	White	Winthrop, Massachusetts	Allen was killed by police after crashing a truck into an unoccupied home and killing two Black civilians. According to investigators, Allen was a suspected White supremacist who had written about White people being "apex predators".
2021-06-21	Johnny Hurley (40)	White	Arvada, Colorado	An officer responded to a report of a suspicious person and was shot and killed by a gunman. A civilian, Johnny Hurley, shot the suspect with a handgun and took his shotgun. Hurley was then killed by a responding police officer.
2021-06-19	Brianna Sykes (19)	Black	Flint, Michigan	Sykes drove up to an officer directing traffic at Flint's Juneteenth celebration and allegedly fired her gun at the officer, who returned fire at Sykes.
2021-06-19	Tyler Hodge (28)	White	Wichita, Kansas	Wichita police responded to a call on a welfare check for a mother and her daughter. When they arrived police found the mother's boyfriend Tyler Hodge in a detached shed in the backyard armed with a rifle. Hodge began firing at officers, injuring one. Officers returned fire and struck Hodge. Life-saving measures were performed, but Hodge died at the scene.
2021-06-19	Jeff Melvin (20)	Black	Salem, Alabama	
2021-06-19	Darrell Vincent (57)	Black	Bonner Springs, Kansas	
2021-06-18	Daniel Buckingham (31)	White	Hilo, Hawaii	
2021-06-18	Carlos Jackson (43)	Black	Lithia Springs, Georgia	
2021-06-18	Eric Scott Anderson (40)	Unknown race	Encinitas, California	
2021-06-17	Ansy Dolce (29)	Black	Holly Springs, Georgia	
2021-06-17	Daniel Ray (35)	Unknown race	Covington, Kentucky	
2021-06-17	Max Jaramillo (29)	Unknown race	Veguita, New Mexico	
2021-06-16	Jermaine Sonnier (19)	Black	Houston, Texas	
2021-06-16	David Aaron King (40)	White	Harrison, Arkansas	
2021-06-16	Billy Barker (44)	White	Bessemer City, North Carolina	
2021-06-16	John Earle Barnes	White	Alford, Florida	
2021-06-16	Zachary Minissale (34)	White	Eureka, Nevada	
2021-06-16	Kendall A. Jamerson (35)	White	Vesuvius, Virginia	
2021-06-16	Name Withheld	Unknown race	Leonia, New Jersey	
2021-06-15	Perry Boyd (56)	White	Wolcott, Indiana	
2021-06-15	Solomon Jamison (28)	Black	Jackson, Mississippi	
2021-06-15	Juan Miguel Bejar (37)	Hispanic	Perris, California	
2021-06-15	Nathaniel Damien Raabe (48)	White	Westmoreland, Tennessee	
2021-06-14	Manuel Rojas Barajas (65)	Hispanic	Calexico, California	
2021-06-14	Armonda Contreras (43)	Hispanic	Birmingham, Alabama	
2021-06-14	Evin Kimberly Payne (54)	Unknown race	Abbeville, South Carolina	
2021-06-14	Adam Michael Green (40)	White	Hermitage, Tennessee	
2021-06-14	Anthony Hannon (52)	White	Pittsfield, New Hampshire	
2021-06-14	Kevin Giesel (64)	White	Parma, Ohio	
2021-06-13	Eric Cole (42)	Black	Springfield, Ohio	Police were responding to a call after Cole was shot in the shoulder and arm by an unknown party when an officer accidentally ran over Cole. Police say the officer was looking for an address to direct first responders to.
2021-06-10	Calvin Elmore (53)	Unknown	Fulshear, Texas	An officer pulled over Elmore after he ran a stop sign and attempted to arrest him for a drug warrant out of Virginia. The police reported that Elmore shoved the officer, went back into his vehicle, and attempted to drive away. The officer tried to grab Elmore out of the vehicle and then shot him, later reporting that he was afraid of being dragged by the vehicle.
2021-06-13	Ryan Santos (34)	Native Hawaiian and Pacific Islander	Hilo, Hawaii	
2021-06-13	Joe Ruiz (25)	Hispanic	Bakersfield, California	
2021-06-13	Luis Rey Ruiz (20)	Hispanic	Acworth, Georgia	
2021-06-13	Duane Manzanares Jr. (30)	Hispanic	Denver, Colorado	
2021-06-12	Kenneth Earl Mackey (44)	Unknown race	Barstow, California	
2021-06-12	Christopher VanKleeck (31)	White	Wallkill, New York	
2021-06-11	William Kradlak (70)	White	Watsontown, Pennsylvania	
2021-06-10	Gregory Hambric (64)	White	Jasper, Alamaba	
2021-06-10	Josiah L. Byard (21)	Black	Willcox, Arizona	
2021-06-10	Rezek Yaqub Yahya (39)	Black	Salt Lake City, Utah	
2021-06-09	Juan DeLeCruz Rodriguez (58)	Hispanic	Yucca Valley, California	
2021-06-09	Michael Lee Ross Jr, (32)	Black	Forest Hill, Texas	Ross was wanted for stabbing a woman to death in a convenience store parking lot. He was found by police in a creek north of the parking lot, holding a knife. The Texas Rangers, who investigated the shooting, say that after several less-than-lethal shots failed to work, a sergeant instructed officer Logan Barr to retrieve his less-than-lethal shotgun. The rangers say that Barr instead grabbed a regular shotgun and shot Ross, who was standing at the bottom of an embankment with his hands at his side. Police initially stated that Ross was shot after he attempted to harm himself, but rangers disputed this. Barr was arrested for aggravated assault by a public servant on July 28.
2021-06-09	Terrell Gas (36)	Black	College Park, Georgia	
2021-06-09	Zandra Baez (66)	Unknown race	Camden, New Jersey	
2021-06-08	Louis Nathan Leyba (38)	White	Espanola, New Mexico	
2021-06-08	Kevin Christopher Caldwell (33)	White	Columbus, Georgia	
2021-06-07	Daniel Ojeda (47)	Hispanic	Scottsbluff, Nebraska	
2021-06-07	Jeremiah Lee Wright (44)	White	Happy Valley, Oregon	
2021-06-07	Lee Waskiewicz (47)	White	Bayonne, New Jersey	
2021-06-07	Antonio Diaz (39)	Hispanic	Round Rock, Texas	
2021-06-07	Crystal Renee Guhr (42)	White	Garden City, Missouri	
2021-06-07	Clay Willingham (32)	White	Jefferson City, Missouri	
2021-06-06	Johnathan Steve Cooper (27)	White	Lufkin, Texas	
2021-06-06	Name Withheld	Hispanic	Tulsa, Oklahoma	
2021-06-05	Stephen Neil Weigand (29)	White	Griffin, Georgia	
2021-06-05	Jose Angel Ibarra Ruiz (24)	Hispanic	Needville, Texas	
2021-06-04	Name Withheld	Unknown race	Whittier, California	
2021-06-05	Maung Tway (34)	Asian	Green Forest, Arkansas	Green Forest police officers went to Tway's apartment after three of his roommates reported he was causing a disturbance and that they wanted him removed from the premises. Tway allegedly charged at the officer with a machete-type knife. Officer Pedraza shot twice, striking Tway in the chest and the hand. Tway was taken to Mercy Hospital in Berryville, where he was pronounced dead.
2021-06-04	Raymond Edwards (45)	White	Tucson, Arizona	
2021-06-04	Timothy Flowers (29)	Black	Rochester, New York	
2021-06-04	Colton Frederic Wagner (31)	White	Denver, Colorado	
2021-06-04	Andrew Homen (34)	Black	Braintree, Massachusetts	
2021-06-04	Jerry Henley (42)	White	Hilham, Tennessee	
2021-06-03	Winston Boogie Smith (32)	Black	Minneapolis, Minnesota	Smith was wanted on a warrant for probation violation when a U.S. Marshals Fugitive Task Force that included local deputies stopped his car in a parking lot. Smith was shot dead when he allegedly fired at police.
2021-06-03	Kolton Mitchell Chavez (18)	Hispanic	San Antonio, Texas	
2021-06-03	William Brookins Sr. (39)	Black	Phoenix, Arizona	
2021-06-02	Clayton Wayne Barbee (28)	White	Cartwright, Oklahoma	
2021-06-02	Timothy Andrew Kemp (34)	White	Royal, Arkansas	
2021-06-02	Eugene Matthews (24)	Hispanic	Arvada, Colorado	
2021-06-01	Christopher Dyess (43)	White	Sumrall, Mississippi	
2021-06-01	Donald Myers (48)	White	Ray City, Georgia	
2021-06-01	Jonathan Craig Thompson (29)	Unknown race	Independence, Kentucky	
2021-06-01	Robert Pearce (37)	White	Berwick, Louisiana	
2021-06-01	Renardo Green (51)	Black	Annapolis, Maryland	

== See also ==
- Death in custody § United States
- Henry A. Wallace Police Crime Public Database
- List of cases of police brutality
- List of countries with annual rates and counts for killings by law enforcement officers
- List of law enforcement officers killed in the line of duty in the United States
- List of law enforcement officers convicted for an on-duty killing in the United States
- List of shootings by US immigration agents
- List of police reforms related to the George Floyd protests
- List of unarmed African Americans killed by law enforcement officers in the United States
- Lists of killings by law enforcement officers
- Police brutality in the United States
- Police misconduct § United States
- Police riot § United States
- Police use of deadly force in the United States
