= List of killings by law enforcement officers in the United States, July 2026 =

This is a list of people reported killed by non-military law enforcement officers in the United States in July 2026, whether in the line of duty or not, and regardless of reason or method. The listing documents the occurrence of a death, making no implications regarding wrongdoing or justification on the part of the person killed or officer involved. Killings are arranged by date of the incident that caused death. Different death dates, if known, are noted in the description. The table below lists 100 people.

== July 2026 ==
Date	Name (age) of deceased	Race	Location	Description
2026-07-31	Alex Charles (30)	Black	Fort Washington, Maryland	A Maryland-National Capital Park Police officer responded to reports of a man armed with a handgun. He fired one shot, killing the man, when the man didn't comply. The footage from the witness officers was released.
2026-07-31	David Castillo (43)	White	Airway Heights, Washington	Officers responded to reports of a suspicious male in an unoccupied house for sale. An officer and a Spokane County deputy tried to negotiate and get the man to come out, but he refused. When they came in, the man confronted them with a knife. They fatally shot him. Tasers were ineffective.
2026-07-31	Lamont Johnson (53)	Unknown	Indianapolis, Indiana	Former IMPD Deputy Chief and current Lawrence PD Reserve Lieutenant Bill Benjamin was shot while the gunman was mortally wounded during a shooting at an Eastside home. Johnson, who was reportedly the homeowner's ex-boyfriend, showed up at the homeowner's house with a gun. Benjamin, who was working with her at a security company, came to intervene. As the situation escalated, Johnson became erratic and pointed the gun at both of them. He reportedly reached for Benjamin's sidearm while he pointed his gun at him. Both of them then began to fight for the gun and shot at each other. Johnson was shot in the chest and died few days later.
2026-07-31	Jason Anthony Green (45)	White	Willoughby, Ohio	Officers responded to a call about a domestic disturbance and found Green, who was armed with a knife and threatening a woman. The officers ordered him to drop it and tased him, however, it was ineffective. They subsequently retreated to the backyard and kept ordering him to drop the knife. At some point, Green charged at them when they shot him.
2026-07-30	unidentified male	Unknown	New Haven, Michigan	Police received a report of an individual who was armed may be experiencing a mental health crisis. During the encounter when a Macomb County deputy pulled him over, he put his vehicle in reverse, hitting a patrol motorcycle. The deputy fired a shot and a pursuit ensued. A short time later, the suspect stopped his vehicle in the roadway, exited it, and charged at deputies with a weapon before being shot and killed. The suspect was initially wanted for a felonious assault case out of Chesterfield Township.
2026-07-29	John R. Haynes (69)	White	Winfield, Missouri	Lincoln County police responded to a domestic disturbance and assault. Upon arrival, Haynes retreated to the home while armed, prompting a standoff with deputies and MSHP SWAT officers. At some point after several unsuccessful attempts to contact Haynes, Haynes exited the front door and shot a SWAT member in the helmet. The member shot back, killing him.
2026-07-29	Aaron Spencer (23)	Unknown	Fort Myers, Florida	Officers and SWAT members shot and killed Spencer during a standoff, after he barricaded himself and his mother at an apartment where a second person was found shot dead.
2026-07-29	Zhengfeng Bo (67)	Asian	Chino Hills, California	Bo kidnapped a man he knew from work and put him in the trunk of his gray fourth-generation Nissan Altima, shooting him once. Police stopped the vehicle for speeding. During the stop, Bo walked over to the trunk and fired another shot, killing the kidnapped man. A deputy then shot him. Another man was also arrested at the scene.
2026-07-29	unidentified male	Unknown	Los Angeles, California	LAPD responded to reports of a man swinging a bat and hitting occupied vehicles in the Harvard Heights neighborhood. During the encounter, officers shot the man as he advanced toward them with a aluminum bat and raised it with both hands. Police released the footage.
2026-07-27	Jason Castillo (45)	Hispanic	Belleview, Florida	An Amber Alert was issued following Castillo's abduction of a 13-year-old. A short time later, Castillo’s red 2021 Hyundai Santa Fe was detected by license plate readers and a witness. After a vehicular pursuit that ended with a PIT maneuver, Castillo pointed a gun at Marion County deputies from the Hyundai before being fatally shot. The edited footage of him pointing the gun at police was released.
2026-07-27	Brian P. Conrad (48)	Unknown	Leola, Wisconsin	Police responded to reports about a man who was going crazy and waving a gun at his family members. Upon Adams County deputies' arrival, they found Conrad standing in the field armed with a handgun. A deputy shot him after he ignored commands to drop it and approached toward the officers.
2026-07-26	unidentified juvenile (15)	Unknown	New Port Richey, Florida	A state trooper attempted a stop on a vehicle for speeding, but the driver fled, leading to a pursuit. The trooper later attempted a stop on the vehicle, leading it to spin off and crash into a tree. A juvenile passenger was killed. Police said alcoholic drinks were found in the vehicle with them and neither of them were wearing seatbelts.
2026-07-26	Keegan Dean Kennedy (17)	White	Jefferson, Iowa	A driver led Jefferson Police officers along with Greene County deputies on a pursuit after he fled a traffic stop. At some point, Kennedy's Dodge Charger veered into a ditch. The driver subsequently exited the Charger, pulled out a knife, and advanced toward a deputy despite being mortally wounded and stabbed the deputy in the face. The driver was later pronounced dead. The deputy was treated and released.
2026-07-26	Andrew Isaiah Ponce (44)	Hispanic	Fort Worth, Texas	Police responded to a domestic violence call where a man broke into his ex-girlfriend's home with a knife. Police found the man outside, holding the knife to his throat, and shot him after he walked towards them. The footage was released by FWPD.
2026-07-25	Ricky Shane Lindsey (56)	White	Fort Worth, Texas	FWPD was chasing a sexual assault of a child suspect after he cut off his ankle monitor. He confronted the police, led them on the short chase, before being shot when he produced a handgun. The footage was released.
2026-07-24	Gary Blair (43)	White	Chesterfield County, South Carolina	Blair, a Chesterfield County Detention Center inmate, was found dead on July 24 inside his jail cell due to profound dehydration from water deprivation, along with contributing factors including, but not limited to acute bronchial pneumonia, severe pressure ulcers, and extreme weight loss of more than 100 pounds. Investigators also stated that they found evidence that Blair's cell's water supply had been cut off, forcing him to drink toilet water before his death. His death was ruled a homicide by the coroner's office. As of September 30, 2026, six officers involved had been terminated and possible criminal charges were pending.
2026-07-24	Lee Davidson (33)	Black	Bellflower, California	LASD deputies were dispatched to neighborhood about an assault with a deadly weapon. They shot and killed the suspect when he resisted and reached for a handgun despite orders and less-lethal options. Police released the footage.
2026-07-24	Aaron Comer (54)	Unknown	Clearwater, Idaho	Idaho County Sheriff's Office responded to reports about shots fired and screaming. Deputies shot a man during the encounter for reasons unknown.
2026-07-24	Shakair Moncrieffe (27)	Black	Allen Township, Northampton County, Pennsylvania	Off-duty Philadelphia officer, Kenroy Cummings, was suspected of shooting and killing his uncle in a domestic incident in Allen Township before leading state troopers on a pursuit in Hanover Township when they spotted his vehicle. State troopers eventually took him into custody when he drove back home.
2026-07-24	Mark Alderman (58)	White	Quitman, Georgia	GSP troopers responded to a home to assist deputies for a call about an armed man threatening to kill others. Upon arrival, the suspect fired at the troopers before they returned fire and fatally striking him.
2026-07-24	Anthoneil Williams II (17)	Black	Austin, Texas	A juvenile called Austin PD, reporting a man armed with a gun and gave the description of himself. When officers arrived, the juvenile lifted his shirt and reached toward his waistband with a water bottle. Instantly, three officers shot him. The Chief of Police described it as a "suicide by cop." The footage was released by APD.
2026-07-24	Edward Oliver Jr. (62)	White	Fremont, California	Fremont PD responded to an assisted living facility where it was reported that a gunman reportedly holding two people hostage in a meeting room. Officers arrived and shot the armed suspect in the encounter. Police later learned that the gun was fake. The footage had been released by police.
2026-07-24	Darrell Young (17)	Black	Miami Beach, Florida	Miami-Dade Sheriff’s Office were serving a warrant related to alleged firearms violations involving the 17-year-old and an 18-year-old. After knocking on the door, the juvenile emerged from the home with a firearm. The deputies observed imminent threat and shot him. The juvenile, Young, had previously been arrested on an attempted murder charge in Florida City and committed multiple felonies involving firearms in the past. Police released the footage.
2026-07-23	Steve Smith (58)	White	Bonifay, Florida	Smith reportedly shoved a Holmes County deputy and pulled out a gun from the waistband of his pants when they responded to a call, leading the deputy to shoot him. The partial footage was shown in a press conference.
2026-07-23	Mireya Molina Ortiz (65)	Hispanic	Isleta Pueblo, New Mexico	An Albuquerque Police officer crashed into a Ford Expedition during an unrelated pursuit. The driver died of the injuries.
2026-07-23	Cortez Olemaun Jr. (25)	Unknown	Utqiagvik, Alaska	North Slope Borough Police were dispatched to a residence for a reported disturbance. Olemaun Jr. reportedly stood in an exterior doorway holding a rifle, went back inside the residence, before pointing the rifle at officers. Officers subsequently shot him.
2026-07-23	Daniel Konovalov (32)	White	Boise, Idaho	Konovalov called the police about his suicidal intentions. Boise Police arrived near a Chevron gas station and encountered him holding a knife while approaching them. Despite less-lethal means, he continued to approach before officers fired their service weapons.
2026-07-23	Jessica Treat (41)	White	Topeka, Kansas	A woman was shot and killed by a TPD officer after she acted erratically and threatened people inside a building with a butcher knife.
2026-07-22	Jajay Floyd (32)	White	Tupelo, Mississippi	TPD officers responded to a home for domestic violence and shot Floyd as he flashed a gun at them.
2026-07-22	Dalys Jett (21)	Black	Indianapolis, Indiana	IMPD officers went to a scene of a reported domestic disturbance. Outside the home, Jett, a former student athlete, fired at the group officers, injuring two, before being killed by returned fire.
2026-07-22	Corey Ruiz (38)	Black/Hispanic	Madison, Wisconsin	An MPD officer fired three shots at close range in the Marquette neighborhood, killing a restrained suspect shortly after a taser was used. The suspect who was armed with a knife reportedly cut an officer in the struggle before shots were fired.The Madison Police Department is not outfitted with body cameras.
2026-07-21	unidentified male	Unknown	Stephenville, Texas	SPD responded to a home for a suicidal individual. When they tried to talk to the man, the man exited the residence and pointed at them with a handgun. At which point, officers opened fire.
2026-07-21	Jeremy Clark (50)	White	Ada, Oklahoma	An officer with the Chickasaw Lighthorse Police Department responded to a disturbance call and shot Clark, who brandished a gun.
2026-07-21	Daniel Alfons Meltvedt (20)	White	Irvine, California	Meltvedt, who was in mental health crisis, left the home carrying a knife. Crisis Negotiation Team responded and attempted to persuade him to drop the knife. Meltvedt ultimately charged at an officer, prompting the officer to fire. Police released the footage.
2026-07-21	Nicholas Thompson (37)	Unknown	Simi Valley, California	Simi Valley officers pursued a man on suspicion of battery and elder abuse as he fled in a white fourth-generation Chevrolet Silverado. During the chase, a motor officer stationed himself where the disturbance occurred since Thompson sped twice through the neighborhood. When he sped past the officer again, nearly striking the officer and toward the houses, the officer fired shots at the pickup. Thompson then crashed into the officer's motorcycle. Responding officers fired additional shots at Thompson who reversed his pickup toward a cruiser, killing Thompson. No firearm was recovered at the scene. The footage was released.
2026-07-21	Travis Ward (35)	Black	Las Vegas, Nevada	During a physical altercation at a Walmart near Whitney, Ward shot a man before running out of the business along with other customers. The first arrival LVMPD officer heard the shot and ordered Ward to drop the gun, but he didn't comply. The officer subsequently fired at and killed Ward. The victim is in stable but critical condition. The footage was released.
2026-07-20	Clyde Haynes (63)	White	Macon, Georgia	A Bibb County deputy struck a man on the wheelchair who was on the same lane with his cruiser.
2026-07-20	Rommel Delfin Querol (44)	Unknown	Vallejo, California	VPD officers pulled over an armed carjacker when the carjacker fired from a gray eight-generation Honda Accord at police. Officers returned fire, killing him. The footage was released.
2026-07-19	Daniel Lujan Jr. (39)	Hispanic	North Las Vegas, Nevada	Lujan Jr. was firing a rifle in a neighborhood when police received the reports. As officers arrived, they saw Lujan was lying on the ground. When officers attempted to arrest him, Lujan resisted and grabbed an officers rifle, resulting in officers utilizing tasers, physical force, and baton to subdue him. Lujan bled from his head and became unresponsive before later dying in a hospital. Police also believe he was under the influence at the time. The footage was also released.
2026-07-19	Deangelo Fields (37)	Black	Toledo, Ohio	A Toledo officer responded to a report of a man waving a gun at people at a Reynolds Road Sheetz gas station. Upon arrival, the officer chased him into a grassy area Fields before he tripped and fell. The officer shot Field 5 times when he reached into his pocket after commands. A pistol was located nearby. The footage was released.
2026-07-19	Robert Lee Jenkins III (38)	White	Meriden, Connecticut	An MPD officer shot Jenkins as he was actively attacking his father with a baseball bat in his front yard. Jenkins's father died of his injuries. The footage was released.
2026-07-17	David Lopez Vargas (27)	Hispanic	Sunnyside, Washington	Vargas shot an officer during an altercation after arriving at a residential intersection for a wanted person call before four officers shot Vargas dead.
2026-07-17	Erik Saul Roman-Martinez (28)	Unknown	Russellville, Alabama	An officer responded to a disturbance at a trailer park and found a man attacking a DoorDash driver with a knife. The officer shot and killed the man.
2026-07-17	Isaiah James Maciel (25)	Hispanic	Corona, California	A man who was armed with a knife attacked a woman with a rock. When a CPD officer arrived, the man approached an driver and the officer before being shot. The footage was released.
2026-07-16	Levi Taylor Long Sr. (22)	Unknown	Commerce, Georgia	During a domestic disturbance investigation at a residence, CPD officers encountered the subject, Long. Long was armed with a screwdriver before charging toward them. Two officers shot Long after he ignored commands. He died ten days later.
2026-07-16	Andrew Davila (52)	Unknown	San Antonio, Texas	A probationary officer and a field training officer noticed a suspicious man on a bicycle and attempted to stop him. A foot chase ensued which ended in front of a home. The man pulled out a gun and pointed at SAPD officers before four fired and killed him. The footage was released.
2026-07-16	Christopher Dmuchowski (34)	Hispanic	Ruskin, Florida	Hillsborough County deputies came to a home for a report that a woman was being held captive at gunpoint by her ex-boyfriend on the night before the shooting. When they arrived the next day, the suspect ambushed and shot two deputies. A police sergeant shot and killed him.The footage was released by police.
2026-07-16	Brant Peter Valvo (49)	White	Loveland, Colorado	Officers were trying to serve warrants on Valvo at his residence. During the encounter. Vavlo exited the residence and sit on the balcony with a revolver. Despite less-lethal means, Valvo ultimately shot at officers before two returned fire. The district attorney had concluded its investigation and no officers involved will face criminal charges related to the shooting. The footage was released.
2026-07-15	Faryeshi Alladhin (23)	Black	Foothill Farms, California	A man entered a local Starbucks and attempted to barricade a door with a refrigerator before fleeing. He returned to his home and stabbed two victims, a mother and a daughter, with a kitchen knife at the home’s garage. Sacramento deputies spotted the man before shooting him, killing him instantly. The footage was released.
2026-07-15	Arturo Castillo Palomar (26)	Hispanic	Asheville, North Carolina	In the early morning, officers shot and killed a man in the parking lot of the Shakey's bar in downtown Asheville. Police said the man was actively firing a handgun when officers confronted and shot him.
2026-07-14	Milton Banks (42)	Black	Denver, Colorado	Denver Police tried to arrest Banks after assaulted and attempted to carjack a driver while wearing only an underwear and acted erratically. Officers used physical force to subdue him and restrained him on the ground. He later suffered a fatal heart attack. His death had been ruled a homicide by the coroner's office, though they said the presence of a synthetic cannabinoids in his system was also a significant contributing factor.
2026-07-14	Jason Sims (41)	Unknown	Cabin Creek, West Virginia	A man stabbed another man before barricading himself in a house and refusing to leave. After arriving on scene, Kanawha County deputies arrived to serve him a warrant when a K-9 was used in an attempt to take the man into custody. During the encounter, the man stabbed the K-9 with a knife, before officers fatally shot the man. The K-9 was taken to a nearby veterinary hospital, where he received emergency medical treatment.
2026-07-13	Jose Carlos Hoyos-Munoz (59)	Hispanic	Los Angeles, California	Hoyos-Munoz was arrested by LAPD for assault with a deadly weapon against family members after barricading himself for eight hours. Once cleared by the hospital, Hoyos-Munoz was transported to Valley Jail Section for booking. Several Non-Categorical Use of Force encounters occurred during which when Hoyos-Munoz refused to comply and when officers tried to take off handcuffs from him. About 20 minutes after the last use-of-force encounter, Hoyos-Munoz was found unresponsive in the cell before being pronounced dead. The footage was released.
2026-07-13	Jose Angel Castillo (43)	Hispanic	Oakland, California	Oakland PD shot a man who confronted them with two knives at a shopping center parking lot in the Fruitvale neighborhood. The footage was released by police.
2026-07-13	Joan Sebastian Guerrero (26)	Hispanic	Biddeford, Maine	ICE agents shot and killed a Columbian national, after he reportedly tried to flee and "weaponized" his white fourth-generation Kia Rio against the agents. Homeland Security Secretary Markwayne Mullin also reportedly said the deceased wasn't the target of the arrest. DHS and FBI were investigating. The agents involved were not wearing bodycams.
2026-07-12	Noel Almandarez (19)	Hispanic	Woodward, Oklahoma	Almandarez was involved in a fatal hit-and-run which left a pedestrian dead. A Harper County deputy located him and attempted a stop on him, but he fled, leading to a pursuit. At some point, Almandarez tried to hit an assisting officer at an intersection before the officer shot him. His car then crashed into an oncoming semi-trailer truck. He died at the scene.
2026-07-12	Elliott Powers (46)	Black	Gaithersburg, Maryland	Gaithersburg PD responded to calls about a man showing off his gun and loading it near the Montgomery Village Plaza. When GPD officers came and tried to contact the suspect at a bus stop, situation escalated, leading officers to shoot him. The footage was released by the state attorney general.
2026-07-11	Justin David Kindred (38)	White	Shelley, Idaho	Bingham County Sheriff’s Office went to a residence for a wanted man before the suspect led the deputies on a vehicular pursuit with a female passenger inside. He sped toward Interstate 15 in the opposite lane with no headlights on. A Bingham County deputy conducted a pit maneuver on the vehicle in response, resulting it to leave the freeway and overturned. Both the suspect and the female were ejected and succumbed to their injuries.
2026-07-11	Ashlee Dawn Kollars (32)	White	Shelley, Idaho	Bingham County Sheriff’s Office went to a residence for a wanted man before the suspect led the deputies on a vehicular pursuit with a female passenger inside. He sped toward Interstate 15 in the opposite lane with no headlights on. A Bingham County deputy conducted a pit maneuver on the vehicle in response, resulting it to leave the freeway and overturned. Both the suspect and the female were ejected and succumbed to their injuries.
2026-07-11	Reuben Frederick Rausch (21)	White	Yigo, Guam	A Guam officer who was responding to a disturbance call collided with a motorcycle that was heading toward the officer in the same lane. The motorcyclist, a member of the Air Force, died at the hospital.
2026-07-11	Emmanuel Diaz (29)	White	Austin, Texas	Austin PD initially received calls about a man threatening at random people and pointing a gun at them along the trail near the downtown area. Officers located the suspect three hours later and pursued him when he fled on foot. After the chase, the suspect reportedly refused to drop the gun when officers were forced to shoot him. The footage was released by APD.
2026-07-11	David A. Asbury Jr. (44)	White	Omaha, Nebraska	Omaha PD were called to a home in the Aksarben neighborhood for a suicidal subject and were fired upon by Asbury Jr.. One officer returned fire. A photo of him wielding a gun is shown in the later reports.
2026-07-10	James Whiteside (94)	Unknown	Midland, Michigan	Westside, who was driving a Lexus, was T-boned by an off-duty officer while pulling out from a parking lot. Whiteside died. The incident wasn't reported until early August.
2026-07-10	Joshua Tyler Roberts (33)	White	Tunnelton, West Virginia	State police responded to a call about Roberts, who was threatening his neighbor with a machete. When they located Roberts in a van, Roberts ignored commands and raised a gun toward two troopers, who shot and killed him.
2026-07-10	Kenneth Richard Sok (39)	Asian	Blythe, California	A Yuma Border Patrol agent shot and killed Sok after he allegedly charged at them with a sword, injuring an officer. Another individual was injured after being hit by Sok's vehicle. Long Beach Police later identified him as Sok. He was suspected of intentionally killing a pedestrian in a hit-and-run four days prior in Long Beach.
2026-07-10	unidentified male (36)	Unknown	Ross Township, Michigan	Kalamazoo PD and Kalamazoo County Sheriff's Office were called to a home near Augusta for felonious assault and were told that the suspect was armed and was experiencing mental health crisis. A perimeter was set before the man started to fire at them with a rifle. After ten hours of de-escalation efforts, the man fired from the upstairs bedroom window when law enforcement officers shot him dead.
2026-07-10	Jeshon Andrew Hamilton (23)	Black	Longview, Texas	Hamilton reportedly trespassed in a neighborhood and was reported by a 911 caller. Harrison County deputies arrived before they located Hamilton, who pointed a stolen gun to his head before leading them on a foot chase to a construction site. At some point, Hamilton stood his ground and pointed the gun at them despite less-lethal means. Deputies subsequently shot him.
2026-07-10	Derrick Brathwaite (39)	Black	Auburndale, Florida	Auburndale officers and Polk County deputies encountered a murder suspect who fatally shot his girlfriend at the parking lot of a Spectrum store. As officers approached the suspect, the man pulled out a gun and opened fire at them. Five Auburndale officers and two Polk County deputies fired at the suspect, killing him.
2026-07-09	Philip Phillips (58)	White	Whittier, Alaska	Alaska State Troopers fatally shot a convicted sex offender from Wasilla after refusing to surrender and pointing a gun at troopers on a boat while attempting to serve an arrest warrant.
2026-07-08	Austin Hodo (18)	White	Boerne, Texas	During a shots fired report response, Kendall County deputies encountered an armed man, Hodo. Hodo moved toward and fired at them. Deputies shot back, killing him.
2026-07-08	Hayes McCloud (24)	Native American	Seaside, Oregon	McCloud, of Eatonville, Washington, shot and killed two men in Puyallup and Tacoma, Washington, separately. McCloud headed south down to Oregon after the double homicide when OSP troopers spotted his 1996 Toyota 4Runner Sport Edition SUV. A shootout occurred. McCloud drove away and was found dead inside his vehicle a short distance away.
2026-07-08	Seth Jayden Eccles (19)	Black	Avondale Estates, Georgia	DeKalb County Police were investigating an armed robbery of a mail carrier when they spoke to the suspect, Eccles. Eccles fled when officers found out that he had an active arrest warrant. DeKalb County Police later received calls regarding a suspicious person in the backyards of homes, where they located Eccles. Eccles complied with the arrest. During the arrest, DKPD Officer Derrick Harris fired his gun, killing Eccles. GBI has charged Harris with involuntary manslaughter and reckless conduct.
2026-07-08	Christopher Scott Randolph (47)	White	Carbon Hill, Alabama	During a welfare check, Randolph brandished a gun, leading a CHPD officer to fatally shoot him.
2026-07-08	Alfonso Ivy (47)	Black	Germantown, Tennessee	A DEA agent shot and killed a suspect in a hotel room at Extended Stay America after he allegedly pointed a gun at them while serving a drug warrant. He was the second person killed by agents from the Memphis Safe Task Force in four days.
2026-07-07	James Cherry (39)	Black	Ocala, Florida	During a domestic disturbance investigation, Cherry threatened a Marion County deputy with a firearm before being fatally shot.
2026-07-07	Thomas Aquino (20)	Unknown	Fairbanks, Alaska	A state trooper attempted to stop an unidentified Ford sedan for equipment violations, but the driver fled, prompting a pursuit. The pursuit lasted for about 90 seconds when the vehicle drove into a dead-end road. During the confrontation, the vehicle reportedly drove toward a trooper who was giving commands before the trooper shot the driver.
2026-07-07	Jeffrey R. Sergent (43)	White	Bloomville, Ohio	Seneca County deputies and Bloomville officers attempted a stop on Sergent, who was wanted on felony domestic charges. Sergent didn't comply and pulled out knives before he rammed into police vehicles that was blocking his pickup truck. Deputies then fired into the vehicle, killing Sergent. A deputy was treated for minor injuries.The bodycam footage was released from the sheriff.
2026-07-07	James Meyer (55)	White	Sioux Falls, South Dakota	SFPD responded to a welfare check for reported shots fired at a garage before Meyer, the resident, fired at the officers, injuring one. Officers returned fire. Meyer was later found dead inside.
2026-07-07	Lorenzo Salgado Araujo (52)	Hispanic	Houston, Texas	ICE agents attempted to arrest a Mexican national in Houston's East End district. After stopping his Ford Transit, an ICE agent shot Salgado Araujo, with ICE saying he attempted to ram agents with his car, but three witnesses contradicted that claim. DHS later announced that Araujo wasn't the target of the arrest.
2026-07-05	Willie Roderick Eugene Blair (46)	Black	Victorville, California	During a family disturbance, SBSD deputies deployed a taser and arrest him as he was apparently under the influence of drugs and advanced toward a deputy uncooperatively. He subsequently died in a hospital.
2026-07-05	Allen O. Gattino (36)	Unknown	Effingham, Illinois	Gattino went to St. John’s Lutheran Church and wished to speak with the pastor. Church security contacted police about him and a suspicious vehicle, reportedly stolen from Marion County. When law enforcement officers arrived and tried to gain possession of Gattino's firearm, a struggle ensued, leading to the firearm being discharged, killing Gattino. His father suspected that Gattino intentionally shot himself during the struggle. The footage was released by state police.
2026-07-05	Robert E. Nicholson (38)	White	Portsmouth, Virginia	Portsmouth officers responded to a report of domestic assault. Upon arrival, they saw a female victim with stabbed wounds being run over by a vehicle driven by the suspect, Nicholson, leading to a vehicular pursuit. After the chase, the suspect fled into a residence and held a male hostage at knifepoint. After an hour of negotiation efforts, an officer shot Nicholson, after he continued to threaten the individual's life.
2026-07-05	Bryson Hays (25)	Unknown	Beaverton, Oregon	Beaverton Police shot and killed an armed robbery suspect under unclear circumstances.
2026-07-05	Jack Hutchings (24)	White	Peterborough, New Hampshire	An off-duty Peterborough officer was involved in a fatal incident at Hutchings' home where Hutchings was shot and killed by the officer and the officer was found with multiple stabbed wounds. The investigation will conclude whether the unidentified officer acted due to self-defense.
2026-07-05	William Mattias Kreuzer (38)	White	Citrus Heights, California	A domestic violence suspect from Rancho Cordova was fatally shot by Sacramento County deputies following a morning pursuit involving a black fifth-generation Ford Taurus on Interstate 80 that ended near mile marker 100. The shooting occurred after the suspect pointed a gun at deputies inside the vehicle. The footage was released by police.
2026-07-05	Timothy Terrell Christian Jr. (27)	Black	Shreveport, Louisiana	As Shreveport officers tried to break up a fight while responding to a morning fight at an alleyway near the Sand Bar, shots were exchanged between a Baton Rouge man who was reportedly involved in the fight and officers. The man pulled out a gun and shot an officer, before the officer fired back, killing the suspect.
2026-07-05	Tyrin Johnson (20)	Black	Memphis, Tennessee	Officers with the Memphis Safe Task Force responded to a Gayoso Avenue shots fired call in downtown Memphis during the early morning hours. Upon arrival, officers observed several individuals leaving the area. Officers then observed a man carrying a handgun. The man fled on foot, and officers pursued him with assistance from Tennessee National Guard soldiers assigned to the area. During the chase, the man turned toward National Guard members with his weapon before soldiers shot him dead.
2026-07-05	Maurice Daniels (42)	White	Baltimore, Maryland	Officers located a Dodge Grand Caravan near the Walbrook Junction Shopping Center that had been reported stolen during a Baltimore County carjacking around an hour after midnight. Officers, with assistance from the department's Foxtrot aviation unit, followed the vehicle at what they described as a safe distance for about 20 minutes before it pulled over. The driver initially opened the vehicle door as if to exit but quickly got back inside. Officers approached and attempted to remove the driver from the vehicle, but police said he locked the doors and refused to get out. As one officer prepared to break the vehicle's window, another officer saw what appeared to be a gun and alerted the other officers. Officers fatally shot him moments later. Daniels had a BB gun in his possession. The footage was released by Baltimore Police.
2026-07-05	Kevin Perez (32)	Hispanic	Covina, California	A San Pedro man called a tow truck at 3 a.m. in the morning for unknown reasons on the Foothill Freeway near mile marker 42 in Glendora. After the towing company, "Jan's Towing", arrived at the scene, both the man and the tow truck driver got into an argument on the freeway shoulder and the man opened fire, striking the tow driver, and took off. When CHP officers responded, they found the tow truck driver suffering from major injuries. Other officers tracked down the suspect and a pursuit ensued. After a short chase through Covina, the pursuit ended at the Fuel Club gas station. The man exited the vehicle and produced a firearm before officers fatally shot him.
2026-07-04	Jacob Williamson (49)	White	Farm Ridge, Illinois	During the afternoon hours, two LaSalle deputies attempted to serve an Ottawa, Illinois man with a warrant at his property when the man began opening fire on deputies with a weapon after a short pursuit before both officers fatally shot him.
2026-07-03	Stephen Griego (41)	White	Albuquerque, New Mexico	Just minutes before midnight in downtown Albuquerque, Griego was involved in an altercation another man, Juan Ortega, between Central Avenue and 3rd Street. After Ortega shoved Griego, Griego left and retrieved a handgun to shoot Ortega. Officers then ran toward the area, and several shots were fired at the shooter, killing him. A passerby was also struck by gunfire but survived. Ortega also survived the injuries but died days later during an unrelated drug overdose. The footage was released.
2026-07-03	Dustin Zink (37)	White	Florence, Kentucky	Boone County deputies responded to a home for a domestic violence report which came after multiple shots were reported to have been fired. Upon arrival to the scene, officers located the man, an off-duty officer from the Florence Police Department (who joined the department in April 2017) with severe depression, who displayed a weapon to officers and threatened harm both to himself and others. They unsuccessfully proceeded to try to de-escalate the situation, but officers were forced to discharge their weapons after Zink proceeded to fire off his weapon several times at the scene, causing four Boone County deputies to return fire. Following the shooting, the Florence Police Department released a statement following the fatal shooting, stating that Zink "dedicated his career to protecting our community with honor, integrity, and compassion, leaving a lasting impact on the fellow officers and the citizens he served."
2026-07-03	Jason Michael Trevino (37)	White	Jackson, Tennessee	THP troopers had been pursuing a black ninth-generation Honda Accord Coupe heading westbound on Interstate 40 during the afternoon hours, with spike maneuvers being used to stop the vehicle west of mile marker 87, leading to a hours-long standoff, during which the male subject released a young girl from out of the vehicle. A short time later, Trevino, of Lorain, Ohio, exited the Honda and began walking westbound along the shoulder. Officers attempted to use less lethal actions to take him into custody but were unsuccessful. The situation escalated when the man brandished a weapon, resulting in officers firing upon him, striking and killing him.
2026-07-02	Blaine Branham (82)	Unknown	Tumtum, Washington	Stevens County deputies responded to a rural community along Highway 291 and Long Lake when a mother reported her two children were distraught after a man fired shots at them. They were both uninjured. When her husband went to inquire, he was confronted by the armed man. They made multiple attempts to contact the man at his residence. Later during the evening hours, the man exited his home carrying a handgun and refusing to obey orders while advancing on the deputies, before one officer fatally shot him dead. Four officers were placed on administrative leave after the shooting.
2026-07-02	David Cano (46)	Hispanic	La Puente, California	An undercover Alhambra PD Chrysler Pacifica van collided with a motorcyclist at an intersection. The motorcyclist, Cano, died at the scene. Two people inside the police van were treated for minor injuries.
2026-07-02	Joseph Smithers (32)	Black	Philadelphia, Pennsylvania	PPD officers received a morning call involving an irate man outside St. Christopher's Hospital for Children, possibly having a mental health crisis. When officers arrived at the hospital, they were told by hospital security staff that the man may have a weapon. As officers approached the man near a bus stop, the man pulled out a weapon and one officer shot him. He was transported to Temple Hospital where he died from his injuries. A woman who stood right next to the suspect was also shot by police, and was transported in critical but stable condition.
2026-07-02	Ismael Jerrod Clark (35)	Black	Summerville, South Carolina	Dorchester County deputies fatally shot a burglary suspect at a Sonny’s Marathon gas station after receiving reports of an in-progress burglary during the midnight hours. He was transported to a nearby hospital where he was pronounced dead. Officers recovered an item that was used by the suspect, turning out to be a glass bottle that was shaped like a gun and painted it black to resemble a revolver.
2026-07-01	Abrihaim Abuswei (19)	Hispanic	Houston, Texas	HPD officers located a stolen car before three masked suspects entered and sped away, prompting a pursuit. The vehicle later lost control on Highway 6 and crashed the vehicle. One of the suspects exiting the vehicle was then fatally struck by an oncoming pursuing police cruiser which swerved into the wreck. The drover of the stolen vehicle, Steven Andrew Molina, was subsequently charged with murder, as investigators stated that his act of leading a pursuit led to the death of Abuswei. The footage was released.
2026-07-01	Malcolm Matthews (39)	Black	Biloxi, Mississippi	A high-speed pursuit involving a U-Haul Ford Transit occurred after Matthews fired shots at a substation in Gulfport. The pursuit ended in Biloxi when the man opened fire on Biloxi officers near the Treasure Bay Casino and Hotel, prompting them to return fire. Matthews died two days later on July 3.
2026-07-01	Bruce Charles Thomas (24)	Black	Kansas City, Kansas	Officers responded to a report of a man making threats in a family disturbance. When officers arrived around 10 minutes later, they found the caller that had been assaulted with minor injuries. Officers attempted to arrest Thomas but ran upstairs. He later came out of a room holding a knife and began advancing towards officers. One officer fatally shot Thomas.

== See also ==
- Death in custody § United States
- Henry A. Wallace Police Crime Public Database
- List of cases of police brutality
- List of countries with annual rates and counts for killings by law enforcement officers
- List of law enforcement officers killed in the line of duty in the United States
- List of law enforcement officers convicted for an on-duty killing in the United States
- List of shootings by US immigration agents
- List of police reforms related to the George Floyd protests
- List of unarmed African Americans killed by law enforcement officers in the United States
- Lists of killings by law enforcement officers
- Police brutality in the United States
- Police misconduct § United States
- Police riot § United States
- Police use of deadly force in the United States
