= Benjamin Crump =

American lawyer (born 1969)

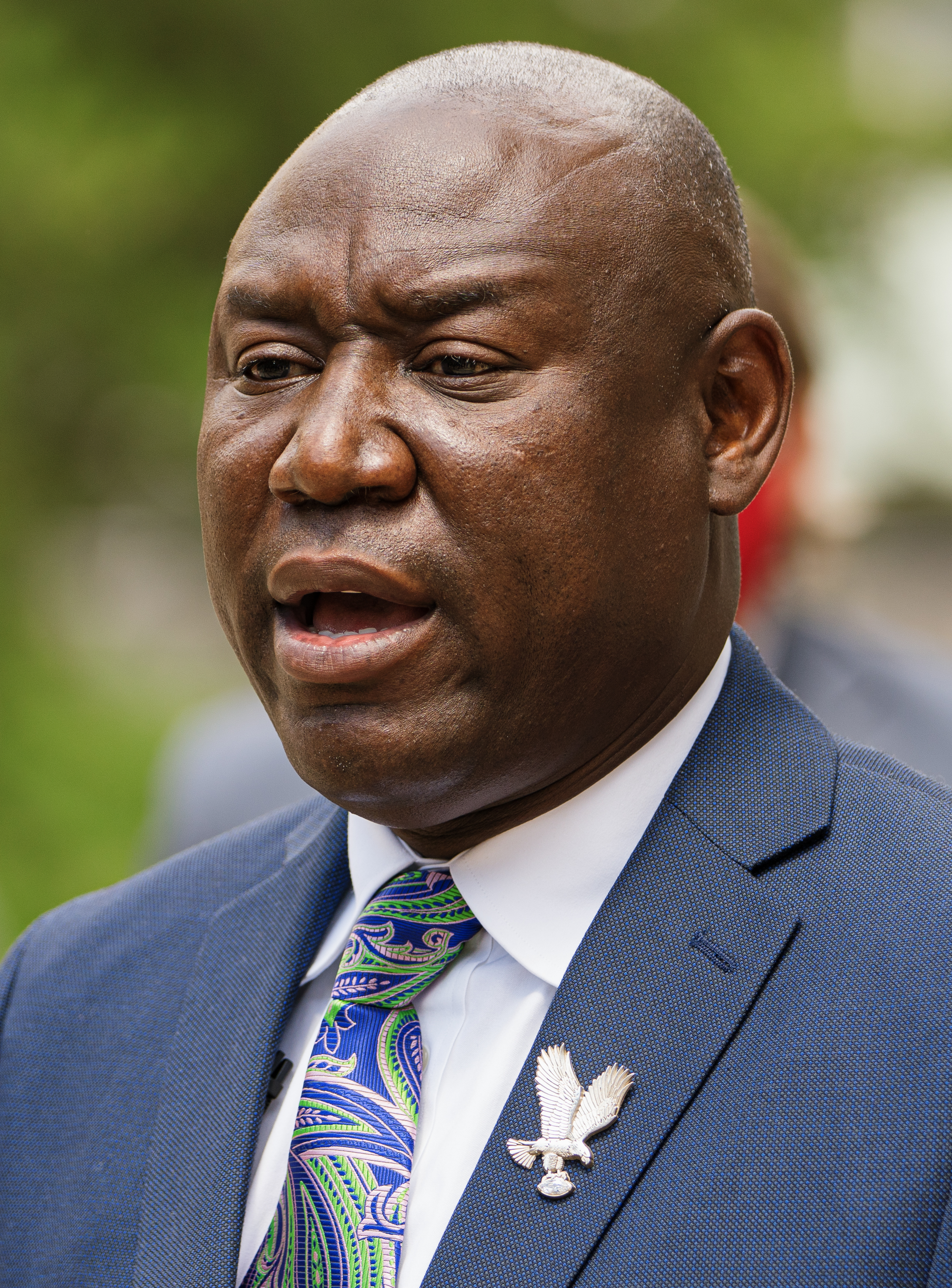
- Crump in 2020
- Born: Benjamin Lloyd Crump; October 10, 1969 (age 57); Lumberton, North Carolina, U.S.
- Education: Florida State University (BS, JD)
- Political party: Democratic
- Spouse: Genae Crump
- Children: 1
- Website: bencrump.com

Benjamin Lloyd Crump (born October 10, 1969) is an American attorney who specializes in civil rights and catastrophic personal injury cases such as wrongful death lawsuits. His firm has represented the families of Trayvon Martin, Breonna Taylor, Michael Brown, George Floyd, Keenan Anderson, Sonya Massey, and Tyre Nichols, as well as people affected by the Flint water crisis, the estates of Henrietta Lacks and Malcolm X, nearly 200 concertgoers from the 2021 Astroworld Festival, and the plaintiffs behind the 2019 Johnson & Johnson baby powder lawsuit alleging the company's talcum powder product led to ovarian cancer diagnoses. Crump is the founder of the firm Ben Crump Law of Tallahassee, Florida.

In 2020, Crump became the attorney for the families of Ahmaud Arbery, Jacob Blake, George Floyd, and Breonna Taylor. In 2021, he became the attorney for a passenger in the car with Winston Boogie Smith and for the family of Daunte Wright. Ongoing cases surrounding their killings or injuries led to protests against police brutality in America as well as internationally.

Due to his legal reputation, he has been referred to as "Black America's attorney general".

== Early life and education ==
Benjamin Lloyd Crump was born in Lumberton, North Carolina, near Fort Bragg. The oldest of nine siblings and step-siblings, Crump grew up in an extended family and was raised by his grandmother. His mother, Helen, worked as a hotel maid and in a local Converse shoe factory. His mother sent him to attend South Plantation High School in Plantation, Florida, where he lived with her second husband, a math teacher, whom Crump regards as his father.

Crump attended Florida State University and received his bachelor's degree in criminal justice in 1992 and his Juris Doctor in 1995. He is a life member of the Omega Psi Phi fraternity. He is also an active Prince Hall Affiliated (PHA) Freemason, being a Master Mason affiliated to J.R.E. Lee Sr. Lodge No. 422 and Michael R. Moore Lodge No. 764 under the M∴W∴ Union Grand Lodge of Florida, and having received the 33rd Degree of the Ancient and Accepted Scottish Rite, PHA, Southern Jurisdiction.

== Early career ==
=== 2002–2014: Martin and Brown cases ===
In 2002, Crump represented the family of Genie McMeans Jr., an African American driver who died after being shot by a White state trooper. In 2007, Crump represented the family of Martin Lee Anderson, a teenager who died after a beating in 2006 by guards in a Florida youth detention center.

In 2012, Crump began representing the family of Trayvon Martin, who was killed by George Zimmerman on February 26, 2012.

Crump also represented Ronald Weekley Jr., a 20-year-old African-American skateboarder beaten by police in Venice, California in 2012.

Crump also represented the family of Alesia Thomas, a 35-year-old African-American woman who died while in police custody in August 2012. Journalist Chuck Philips reported that during the arrest by LAPD Officer Mary O'Callaghan, Thomas was "slammed to the ground, handcuffed behind her back, kicked in the groin, hog-tied and stuffed into the back seat of a patrol car, where she died." Crump demanded that dashboard video of the incident be released, threatening legal action and encouraging Attorney General Eric Holder to launch a federal probe. In October 2013, one of the arresting officers was charged with felony assault of Thomas, pleading not guilty. Judge Shelly Torrealba signed off on a request by the district attorney's office only to release the video to prosecutors and defense attorneys. This was to prevent the tainting of potential jury candidates, O'Callaghan's attorney Robert Rico said.

On August 11, 2014, the family of Michael Brown announced that they would be hiring Crump to represent their case, especially as the death had been widely compared to the Trayvon Martin case. Also in 2014, Crump was initially hired to represented the family of Tamir Rice, an African-American youth who was killed by police in Cleveland, Ohio, while holding a toy gun. Samaria Rice, the mother of Tamir Rice has criticized Crump and stated that she fired him 6–8 months into Tamir's case. One reason was that she felt it was questionable whether Benjamin Crump knew the laws in the state of Ohio.

=== 2015–2019: Continued civil rights work ===
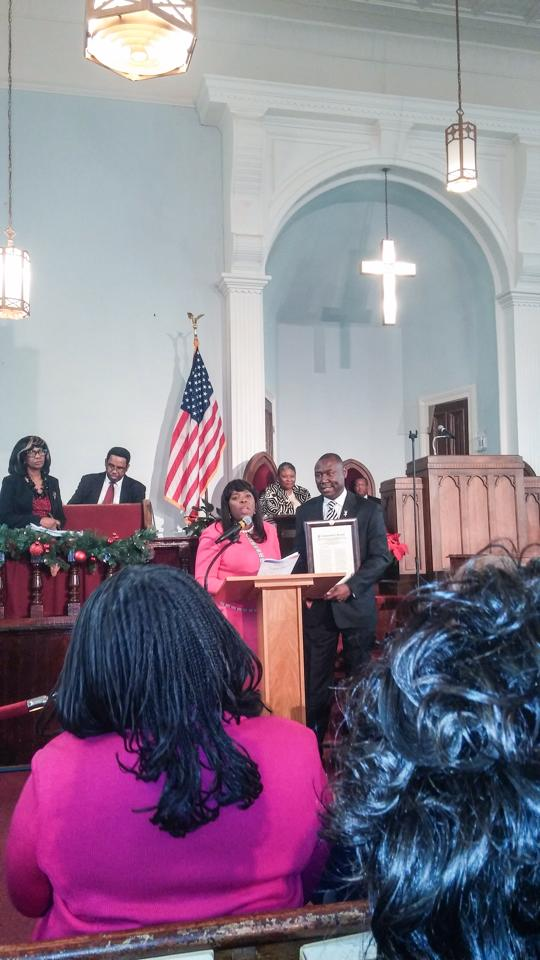
Crump with U.S. Representative Terri Sewell on the 60th anniversary of the Montgomery bus boycott

In 2015, Crump represented the family of Antonio Zambrano-Montes, an undocumented immigrant from Mexico who was killed by three policemen in Pasco, Washington. Also in 2015, he represented the family of Kendrick Johnson, an African-American high-school student who was found dead at his school in Valdosta, Georgia, under mysterious circumstances, but stepped down from their legal team in late 2015. In late 2015, Crump began representing the family of Corey Jones, who was killed by a plainclothes officer while waiting for a tow truck in South Florida.

In 2016, Crump began representing the family of Terence Crutcher, an unarmed black man shot and killed by a Tulsa police officer.

In 2017, Crump announced the opening of a new law firm, Ben Crump Law, PLLC.

In 2018, Crump represented the family of Zeke Upshaw in a wrongful death suit after Upshaw, an NBA G League player, collapsed mid-game and was delayed assistance by the NBA's paramedics. Also in 2018 he became a board member for the National Black Justice Coalition.

In 2019, Crump partnered with law firm Pintas & Mullins to hold several rallies in Flint, Michigan for communities affected by the Flint water crisis. Also in 2019, Crump began representing several plaintiffs in a lawsuit against Johnson & Johnson alleging that the company's talc powder was directly related to said-plaintiffs' ovarian cancer diagnoses.

== Injury and death cases ==
=== 2020 cases ===
In early 2020, Crump began working with the family of Ahmaud Arbery, an unarmed 25-year-old African-American man murdered by two White civilians. Around this same time, the family of police shooting-victim Breonna Taylor, a 26-year-old African-American woman, retained Crump for the family's lawsuit alleging excessive force and gross negligence by the Louisville Metro Police Department. Taylor was killed after police entered her apartment after obtaining a flawed "no-knock warrant" and shot Taylor eight times.

After the death of 46-year old George Floyd in May 2020, Crump began representing his family. George Floyd was murdered by Minneapolis Police Department officer Derek Chauvin, who knelt on Floyd's neck for over nine minutes. At the time, Floyd was unarmed and exclaimed to Chauvin and other deputies "I can't breathe". Chauvin was initially charged with third-degree murder and second-degree manslaughter; however, an additional second-degree murder charge was added 10 days later, and the three officers also present at the scene were subsequently charged with "aiding and abetting second-degree murder and aiding and abetting second-degree manslaughter." In April 2021, Chauvin was convicted on all three charges. In June 2020, Crump testified before the U.S. Senate Judiciary Committee about the George Floyd case and the discriminatory treatment of African Americans by the U.S. justice system.

In a two-day span in late August 2020, Crump was among counsel retained to represent the families of Trayford Pellerin, a 31-year-old African American man killed by police in Lafayette, Louisiana, and Jacob Blake, a 29-year-old African-American man shot at seven times (hit four times in the back) by a police officer in Kenosha, Wisconsin, while his children watched from the car. Crump retained Patrick A. Salvi Sr & Jr as co-counsel.

=== 2021 cases ===
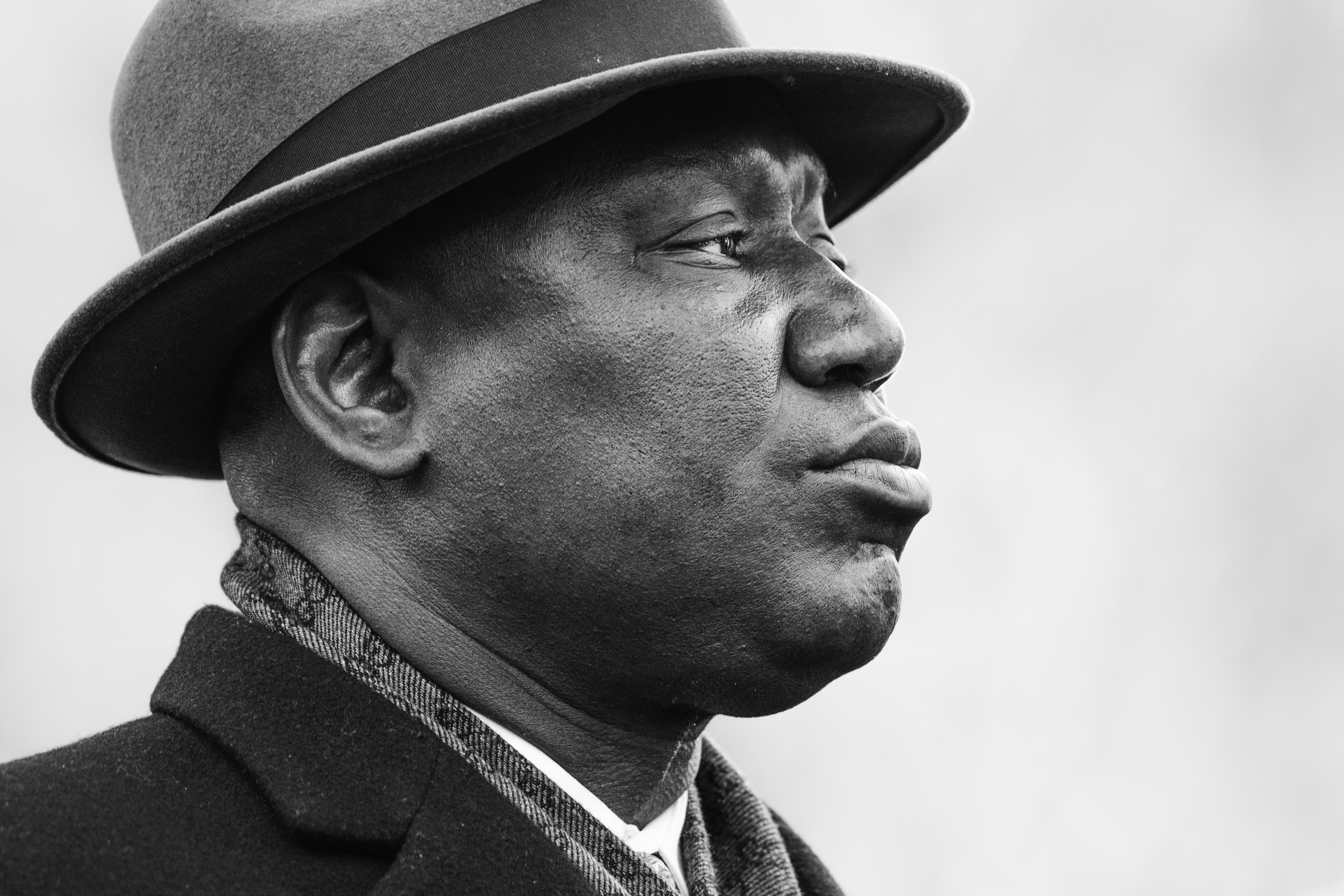
Crump in 2021

In early 2021, Crump began representing the family of nineteen-year-old Christian Hall, who was shot and killed by Pennsylvania State Troopers in Monroe County. Hall was shot and killed in December 2020 on the overpass to Interstate 80 in Hamilton Township after reports of a suicidal man with a gun on the bridge. Troopers said that at one point during negotiations, Hall was uncooperative and pointed the gun in the direction of officers. State Police then shot and killed Hall. Attorneys for the family, including Crump, stated that a video circulating online shows a different story.

In April 2021, Crump began representing the family of Daunte Wright, a 20-year-old African American shot and killed by a Brooklyn Center Police Department officer. Former Brooklyn Center Police Chief Tim Gannon said that the officer intended to use her taser but inadvertently drew her handgun. On December 23, 2021, a Hennepin County, Minnesota jury found the officer who shot him, Kimberly Potter, guilty of first-degree manslaughter and second-degree manslaughter. On October 3, 2022, nearly 18 months after the April 11, 2021 police-involved fatal shooting of 20-year-old Daunte Demetrius Wright in Minneapolis, the Wright family and the office of Benjamin Crump were served a lawsuit by Chyna Whitaker, Wright's son's mother. Whitaker filed the suit over GoFundMe proceeds she said were to go to her. A spokesperson for attorney Ben Crump told the press, "This is strictly a family dispute between the mother of Daunte Wright's child and Daunte's parents."

In June 2021, Crump and Devon Jacob (who also represented the family of George Floyd) began representing the family of Hunter Brittain, a 17-year-old shot and killed by Lonoke County, Arkansas sheriff's deputy Michael Davis. Davis shot Brittain during a traffic stop on June 23 after Brittain was attempting to use a jug of antifreeze to stop his truck from rolling into the officer's vehicle; Davis failed to activate his body camera until after the shooting and was subsequently fired.

In 2021, Crump and Christopher Seeger (co-founder of the law firm Seeger Weiss) announced that they would be representing members of the family of Henrietta Lacks in a lawsuit against several pharmaceutical companies that have profited from the cell line HeLa, which is based on cervical cancer cells taken from Lacks without her knowledge in 1951, when it was not illegal to do so. The family of Lacks came to a confidential settlement with Thermo Fisher Scientific Inc. in July 2023.

=== 2022 cases ===
Crump began representing Amir Locke's family in February 2022. Locke was shot and killed by the Minneapolis Police Department on February 2, 2022, while police were executing a search warrant.

In March 2022, Crump started representing the family of Tyre Sampson, who was killed after falling from a drop ride at Orlando's Icon Park. Sampson's death prompted the Florida governor to pass the Tyre Sampson Act, which strengthened safety standards for amusement park rides.

In April 2022, Crump took on the case of Patrick Lyoya of Grand Rapids, Michigan, who was killed by Officer Christopher Schurra, a police officer from the Grand Rapids Police Department, who shot Lyoya in the back of the head after Lyola fled a traffic stop. Lyoya was unarmed.

In May 2022, Crump was retained by the families of Andre Mackneil, Geraldine Talley, and Ruth Whitfield, three victims of the 2022 Buffalo shooting on May 14. That same month, Crump took on the case of Rwandan politician Paul Rusesabagina, who was sentenced to 25 years in prison by the Rwandan government.

In October 2022, Crump was retained by the family of Erik Cantu. The 17-year-old was shot by a San Antonio Police Department officer while eating a hamburger in his car at a McDonald's parking lot. In December 2022, Crump was hired by Emily Proulx, a passenger of Cantu's during the shooting.

=== 2023 cases ===
- In January 2023, Crump began representing the family of Earl Moore Jr. in a wrongful death lawsuit against two Illinois paramedics, along with ambulance service company LifeStar. Moore died on December 18, 2022, as a result of asphyxiation after he was strapped face down to a stretcher while in medical distress. The paramedics, Peter Cadigan and Peggy Finley, were charged with first-degree murder in January 2023.
- Also in January 2023, Crump announced he would represent the family of Tyre Nichols, who died on January 10, three days after a traffic stop, when five Memphis, Tennessee police officers tried to arrest Nichols for alleged reckless driving. During the incident, the officers beat Nichols, and he was taken to the hospital after he reported he had shortness of breath.
- In April 2023, Crump began representing the family of Ralph Yarl, a 16-year-old Black teenager shot for ringing the doorbell of the wrong house. The shooter was an 84-year-old White man and the owner of the house.
- In May 2023, Crump represented the family of Ed Townsend, songwriter of "Let's Get It On", in suing Ed Sheeran, songwriter of "Thinking Out Loud." The plaintiffs claimed that elements of "Thinking Out Loud" were taken from "Let's Get It On" without permission. The case was decided in Sheeran's favor on May 4, 2023.
- In June 2023, Crump began representing the family of Ajike Owens, who was shot through her locked front door and killed by a white neighbor after the neighbor got into an argument with her children in a nearby field. The shooter was found guilty of first-degree felony manslaughter and sentenced to 25 years in prison in November 2024.
- In July 2023, after the firing of Northwestern University's head football coach Pat Fitzgerald, Crump partnered with Chicago attorney Steven Levin to represent Northwestern University football players who alleged that they were victims of hazing and racism.

=== 2024 cases ===
- In May 2024, the family of Roger Fortson hired Crump to represent them after Fortson was killed. Fortson was a 23-year-old Black U.S. Air Force airman who was shot and killed by police in his Fort Walton Beach apartment. The body camera footage of this was released. According to Crump, a witness statement claimed that police entered the wrong apartment.
- In June 2024, the family of D'vontaye Mitchell retained Crump after Mitchell died following an altercation with Hyatt Regency hotel security. Witness footage shows four security officers holding him down on his stomach. Crump referenced the video in a press conference with the family, saying the security officers are to be blamed for his death and that he will help the family seek justice. On August 2, the medical examiner ruled his death a homicide. By August 6, prosecutors charged four hotel employees with felony murder.
- In July 2024, Crump began representing the family of Sonya Massey following her July 6 shooting death by a deputy of the Sangamon County Sheriff's Office in Springfield, Illinois. Massey was allegedly shot and killed by deputy Sean Grayson in her home following a 911 call that she placed to report a "prowler." Grayson was charged with three counts of first-degree murder, among other charges, and pled not guilty.
- In October 2024, Crump began representing the family of Amber Thurman following her 2022 death at Georgia's Piedmont Henry Hospital. Thurman obtained abortion pills while in North Carolina, and upon returning to Georgia, Thurman experienced complications from remaining fetal tissue. Though recent Georgia law criminalized with few exceptions the life-saving treatment that Thurman needed, doctors still waited 20 hours to begin a surgical intervention, but by then, it was too late. Later ProPublica investigations stated that Thurman's death was "preventable." A Georgia judge later struck down the state's 6-week abortion ban. In the wake of this decision, Vice President Kamala Harris said "[Amber Thurman] should be alive today."
- In November 2024, Crump filed a federal lawsuit on behalf of the family of Malcolm X, a preeminent black civil rights leader in the 20th century, who was assassinated in 1965.

=== 2026 cases ===
- In June 2026, Crump began representing the family of Kohen Wiley, a 1-year-old killed by a police officer in Senatobia, Mississippi. On July 1, he presented an independent autopsy of Wiley.
- In July 2026, Crump was retained to represent the family of Nolan Wells who drowned on a barrier island off the coast of Mississippi.
- In July 2026, Crump was retained to represent the family of Corey Ruiz who was killed by police in Madison, Wisconsin.

== Filmography ==
In the final scene of the 2017 movie Marshall, Benjamin Crump appears as civil rights attorney Z. Alexander Looby welcoming Thurgood Marshall (played by Chadwick Boseman) at a Mississippi train station. He is accompanied by Tracy Martin and Sybrina Fulton, the parents of Trayvon Martin, who appear as the parents of the 14-year-old Mississippi boy Thurgood Marshall is there to represent.

In April 2017, Crump appeared as himself on the American reality prime-time court show You the Jury. Later, in December 2017, Crump investigated the murder of Tupac Shakur in the television documentary series Who Killed Tupac? The show narrates an investigation led by Crump, who works with Tupac's brother, Mopreme Shakur.

In 2018, Crump hosted a documentary television series on TV One called Evidence of Innocence. The show focused on people who served at least a decade behind bars after being wrongfully convicted of a crime. Crump hoped to "impact the larger society about these larger matters so they can be aware when they go into the courtroom as jurors."

On June 19, 2022, Netflix commemorated Juneteenth with the release of Civil: Ben Crump. A Netflix original, the documentary film is produced by Kenya Barris and directed by Nadia Hallgren. In July 2023, Civil was nominated for an Emmy Award.

In 2024, Crump produced the 35-minute film How to Sue the Klan. The film covers the 1980 Ku Klux Klan shooting of five black women in Chattanooga, Tennessee. Two of the men involved in the shooting were acquitted, and a third man was sentenced to nine months in prison, but got out in six. After public outcry, the Center for Constitutional Rights picked up the case and filed a federal civil lawsuit. The court awarded $1.5 million (adjusted for inflation) to the five women, and the verdict included an injunction against all Klan activities in the city of Chattanooga. How to Sue the Klan premiered on February 9, 2024, at the Walker Theatre in Chattanooga, Tennessee. It was met with critical acclaim, and went on to win best short documentary at the Harlem International Film Festival, best documentary short at the Roxbury International Film Festival, and best documentary at the NC Black Film Festival. In February 2025, the film won an NAACP Image Award, and in February 2026, the film won an Emmy Award for Historical Documentary for films in the Midsouth and Nashville region.

== Accolades ==
Crump was included on the Time 100, Time's annual list of the 100 Most Influential People in the World in 2021. Lawyers of Distinction named Crump their 2021 Lawyer of the Year.

St. Thomas University in Florida renamed their College of Law after Crump in 2023. Benjamin L. Crump College of Law is the only law school in the country named after a currently practicing African American lawyer and the second in the country to be named after an African American.

In 2023, Crump was awarded the Social Impact Award at the NAACP Image Awards. Crump said In his acceptance speech, "I accept this award as greater motivation to continue to be an unapologetic defender of Black life, Black liberty, and Black humanity.”

In 2024, Crump was included in Forbes' inaugural list of America's Top 200 Lawyers. Crump is one of the seven black lawyers included on the list. Forbes describes the list as a culmination of lawyers "with a reputation for integrity [and a] record of excellence."

== Books ==
Crump authored Open Season: Legalized Genocide of Colored People in 2019. It was published by HarperCollins Publishers.

Crump also wrote Worse Than a Lie, a crime thriller novel, in 2026. It was named on Ebony Magazine's Get Lit Book Pics list for February 2026, The New York Times' list of best new mysteries for February 2026, and debuted twelfth on the New York Times Best Seller's list for the fiction hardcover category.

== Bibliography ==
- Crump, Benjamin L. "Ben Crump — the Man Who Represented the Families of Michael Brown, Trayvon Martin, and Tamir Rice — Will Not Stop Fighting for Justice." NowThis, June 24, 2018.
- Crump, Benjamin L. "Every Black Person Has Had A 'Starbucks Moment'". HuffPost, April 21, 2018.
- Crump, Benjamin L. "After Stephon Clark's Death, Shock and Mourning in Communities across the Nation." USA Today, March 29, 2018.
- Crump, Benjamin L. "Stand Your Ground Is a License to Kill. Repeal It." Miami Herald, February 5, 2018.
- Crump, Benjamin L. "Libyan Slave Trade Perpetuates The Commodification of Black Bodies." HuffPost, January 5, 2018.
- Crump, Benjamin L. "Civil Rights Resolutions for a Better America in 2018". CNN, January 2, 2018.
- Crump, Benjamin L. "The Unsolved Murder of Tupac Shakur Speaks To The Black Male's Experience Nationwide". HuffPost, December 12, 2017.
- Crump, Benjamin L. "Trump's Response To Charlottesville Was Far Too Little And Way Too Late." HuffPost, August 15, 2017.
- Crump, Benjamin L. "Only A Just America Will Be A Truly Great America". HuffPost, January 15, 2017.
- Crump, Benjamin L. "Benjamin Crump: Seven Deaths Cannot Be In Vain". TIME, July 8, 2016.
- Crump, Benjamin (April 20, 2015). "Will America now challenge the standard police narrative?". United States. Crime. Time. Vol. 185, no. 14 (South Pacific ed.). p. 22.
