= Shooting of Erik Cantu =

2022 shooting in San Antonio, Texas, US

- Date: October 2, 2022; 3 years ago
- Time: c. 10:43:34 pm (CDT)
- Location: San Antonio, Texas, U.S.
- Type: Police shooting
- Filmed by: Police body camera
- Injuries: Four gunshot wounds, critical condition, developed pneumonia after injuries
- Accused: James Brennand
- Charges: Aggravated assault (two counts), attempted murder (All criminal charges dismissed on July 13, 2026)

On October 2, 2022, Officer James Brennand of the San Antonio Police Department (SAPD) shot 17-year-old Erik Cantu in the parking lot of a McDonald's restaurant in San Antonio, Texas, United States.

After responding to an unrelated disturbance, Brennand saw Cantu eating a hamburger in his vehicle, and recognized the vehicle as the same one that had evaded him at a traffic stop the day prior. After opening Cantu's driver-side door, Brennand opened fire when Cantu reversed the vehicle. Brennand was fired less than a week later and was later charged with two counts of aggravated assault by a peace officer. He was later indicted for aggravated assault and attempted murder. Following the incident, Cantu was immediately placed on life support and remained hospitalized for a number of weeks.

== Background ==
James Brennand was a probationary officer who had been with the SAPD for seven months. The day prior to the shooting, the same maroon vehicle was used to evade an encounter with the police. The initial encounter initiated by Brennand is suspected to have been due to the vehicle's use of license plates that were not registered to it. Officials with the city of San Antonio blocked the release of public information related to the case, however, which was later dropped. SAPD officials have since confirmed that the license plates did not belong to the vehicle Cantu was operating but stated that the vehicle was not stolen. Whether or not Cantu was the same individual from the incident the day before was initially unclear, with some media outlets reporting that Cantu was not the same individual. For example, ABC News reported that officer Brennand had "confus[ed] him and his car with someone who fled from an attempted stop the night before." The San Antonio Current later reported that Cantu apparently was the same individual, based on police records of an interview with Cantu's girlfriend. She claimed that she was in the car with him during both incidents and that the first incident left her hesitant to get in the car with him again, fearing that Cantu's actions might lead to their arrest or even being "shot at."

== Shooting ==
Around 10:45 PM on October 2, Officer Brennand responded to the McDonald's on Blanco Road in San Antonio for an unrelated disturbance call. As he questioned witnesses, Brennand noticed Cantu's vehicle, which had evaded him the day before. The vehicle had license plates registered to another vehicle, making Brennand think it was stolen. After Brennand called for backup, he approached the vehicle, opened the driver-side door, and ordered Cantu to exit. As Cantu reversed his vehicle, Brennand fired five times. He then fired five more times as the vehicle drove away. A passenger sitting in the vehicle was uninjured. Police later stated that while the vehicle had license plates registered to another vehicle, it was not stolen.

Cantu was rendered unconscious and put on life support as a result of the shooting. An attorney for the family said that, "any reports that Cantu is stable or is 'going to be fine' are not true." On October 25, 2022, the family gave a press conference, where they stated that Cantu had developed pneumonia. In addition, the family stated that three of the bullets had been removed, but not a fourth, located near his heart. Cantu's father stated that his condition was "touch and go." On November 7, Cantu's family stated he was weaned off life support and was placed on high-flow oxygen via a tracheostomy. On November 22, Cantu was released from the hospital and returned home.

== Public Reactions ==
The Party for Socialism and Liberation and ACT 4 SA held a protest on October 11 outside the SAPD headquarters.

Cantu's family hired civil rights lawyer Ben Crump. Cantu's girlfriend also hired Crump.

== Investigation and charges ==
=== Initial investigation and charges ===
Two days after the shooting, Brennand was fired. A spokesperson for the SAPD said Brennand violated his training and police procedures, citing how he approached the vehicle before backup arrived. On October 11, Brennand was charged with two counts of aggravated assault by a public servant – one count for Cantu and another for the uninjured passenger. SAPD Police Chief William McManus stated that if Cantu died, the charges could have been upgraded to homicide. Brennand was released on a $200,000 bail. His pre-hearing was set for November 23, 2022. He was later indicted by a grand jury for aggravated assault and attempted murder.

Cantu was initially charged with evading detention in a vehicle and assault on a peace officer, but Bexar County District Attorney Joe Gonzales later announced the charges would be dismissed "out of compassion because the teen is in critical condition in the hospital."

=== 2026 dismissal and civil litigation ===
Legal and criminal developments regarding the case shifted extensively by 2026. On April 1, 2026, Erik Cantu had his community supervision revoked by Judge Stephanie Boyd in the 187th District Court due to multiple probation violations. These violations stemmed from a December 2025 arrest where Cantu was charged with burglary of a habitation after breaking into the apartment of his child's mother and co-plaintiff, Emily Proulx, to steal an iPad. Cantu was initially sentenced to two years in prison, but avoided further incarceration on June 8, 2026, after accepting a plea bargain that granted him a two-year deferred adjudication sentence for the burglary charge.

The criminal trial for the former officer, James Brennand, was scheduled to begin with jury selection on July 20, 2026. However, on July 13, 2026, during a pretrial hearing in Bexar County's 437th Criminal District Court, all felony charges against Brennand were officially dismissed.

The dismissal followed a request by prosecutors from the Bexar County District Attorney's Office for a trial continuance to investigate a new criminal offense involving Cantu. On July 1, 2026, a 20-year-old woman alleged that Cantu made terroristic threats to strangle her while driving a vehicle—an action that also violated his active probation order restricting him from operating motor vehicles. Brennand's defense attorneys argued that a trial delay would violate the former officer's constitutional right to a speedy trial, given the four-year duration since the 2022 incident. After Judge Joel Perez denied the state's request for a continuance, the prosecution dismissed the aggravated assault charges against Brennand, stating that the District Attorney's Office intends to refile the charges once the investigation into Cantu's new alleged offenses is completed.

Due to the dismissal of the criminal case, no state-mandated criminal indemnities or restitution payouts were ordered against Brennand. However, federal civil litigation remains active. Cantu and his girlfriend Emily Proulx, who was the uninjured passenger in the vehicle during the 2022 shooting, maintain an ongoing federal civil rights lawsuit against both James Brennand and the City of San Antonio. Represented by civil rights attorney Ben Crump, the plaintiffs are seeking financial damages for severe medical expenses, physical impairment, and permanent psychological trauma.
