= Killing of Earl Moore Jr. =

2022 killing of a man by paramedics in Springfield, Illinois

- Date: December 18, 2022
- Location: Springfield, Illinois, U.S.
- Cause: Asphyxia
- Filmed by: Police body camera
- Accused: Peter Cadigan; Peggy Finley
- Convicted: Peter Cadigan
- Charges: First-degree murder
- Verdict: Peter Cadigan - Guilty
- Convictions: Peter Cadigan - Involuntary Manslaughter
- Sentence: Peter Cadigan - 100 hours of community service, 24 months of probation, 180 days in jail
- Litigation: Peter Cadigan; Peggy Finley; Lifestar EMS - Wrongful Death Lawsuit

On December 18, 2022, Earl Moore Jr. died after being restrained face‐down on a stretcher by emergency medical technicians (EMTs) in Springfield, Illinois. Moore, who was in distress and suffering from hallucinations and alcohol withdrawal, was yelled at and dragged by Paramedic Peggy Finley, before she and partner Peter Cadigan strapped him to the stretcher. Moore was taken to the hospital, where he died an hour later.

On January 9, 2023, Cadigan and Finley were charged with first-degree murder after an autopsy concluded that Moore's death was a homicide as a result of compressional and positional asphyxia.

== Death ==
On the morning of December 18, 2022, police responded to a call at Moore's residence in Springfield, Illinois, after a report that several people inside were in possession of firearms. Upon arrival, officers found Moore in medical distress after detoxing and, recognizing his need for assistance, called for an ambulance. EMT Peter Cadigan and Paramedic Peggy Finley subsequently arrived; during their interaction, Finley is heard yelling at Moore to “sit up” and “quit acting stupid.” Moore, who was unable to walk, was carried to the ambulance by police after he was refused assistance by Cadigan and Finley. The EMTs then placed him on a stretcher in a prone position and secured him with tightened straps prior to transport. Moore was taken to the hospital, where he later died.

An autopsy ruled Moore's death a homicide, determining that it was caused by a "prone face‐down restraint on a EMS transportation cot/stretcher by tightened straps across the back."

== Legal proceedings ==
Both Cadigan and Finley were charged with first‑degree murder in connection with Earl Moore Jr.'s death, and they are facing sentences of 20 to 60 years.

On June 16, 2023, around 8 p.m., Finley was released on bond after a Fourth District Appellate Court ruling reduced her cash bond from $1 million to $600,000. Her attorneys, W. Scott Hanken and Mark Wykoff, described the decision as a "game changer" for her defense, although she is prohibited from working as a paramedic as a condition of her release.

Additionally, Cadigan secured pre‑trial release on October 30, 2023, after his attorney, Justin Kuehn, successfully filed a motion for reconsideration under the Pretrial Fairness Act—a measure designed to eliminate cash bail—with Circuit Judge Robin Schmidt ultimately ordering his release.

As of February 2025, the criminal trial for Finley is ongoing.

As of June 2026 Cadigan was sentenced to 100 hours of community service, 24 months of probation, 180 days in jail (Won't be served due to time already being served prior to plea) & not allowed to be a healthcare worker for the rest of his life following a guilty plea in April 2026 of 1 count of involuntary manslaughter. The civil trial for wrongful death lawsuit is ongoing.

Additionally, Moore's family filed a wrongful death lawsuit against the paramedics involved, as well as LifeStar Ambulance Services. They are represented by Ben Crump and Robert C. Hilliard.
