= Death of Dvontaye Mitchell =

Black American man murdered on video in Milwaukee (1981–2024)

- Location: 43.0412°N 87.9152°W; Hyatt Regency, Milwaukee, Wisconsin, U.S.
- Date: June 30, 2024 c. 4:00 pm CDT (UTC−5)
- Victim: Dvontaye Mitchell
- Charges: Felony murder (4)

Dvontaye L. Mitchell (1981 – June 30, 2024) was a 43-year-old Black American male who was killed during a confrontation with a security detail at the front entrance of the Hyatt Regency Milwaukee Hotel in Milwaukee, Wisconsin.

== Incident ==
Mitchell's killing happened around 4 pm on June 30, 2024, videotaped by bystander-eyewitnesses to the final moments of Mitchell's life being dragged from the hotel and pleading for his life while four hotel staff members pinned him to the ground on his stomach, before ultimately killing Mitchell by 'restraint asphyxia'.

It was reported to local police at the Milwaukee Police Department as a disturbance and subsequent fight. “A witness reported seeing three to four security guards with their knees on Mitchell’s neck and back and one of them striking him in the head with an object,” Attorney Benjamin Crump’s office said.

The cause of the disturbance, according to what witnesses overheard, was Mitchell allegedly walking into the women's bathroom. “They treated him like he was nothing, like he was an animal,” Mitchell’s sister-in-law Candice Miller told the Milwaukee Journal Sentinel.

When police officers arrived, they found Mitchell unresponsive. Resuscitation attempts were unsuccessful and Mitchell was pronounced dead at 4:11 pm.

Toxicology tests later found cocaine and methamphetamine in Mitchell’s system, which the medical examiner listed as contributing factors in his death. Before the confrontation, Mitchell had entered a women’s bathroom in the hotel and, according to witnesses, attempted to lock the door while two women were inside. Three of the four hotel employees who restrained him were themselves Black, a fact noted in press coverage of the case.

== Homicide reports ==
The murder of D'Vontaye Mitchell is a case that sparked national outcry with civil rights activists including Al Sharpton and Ben Crump leading to call to demand "Justice for Dvontaye". It was referenced as strikingly similar in comparison to the murder of George Floyd, with calls for "Justice for Dvontaye Mitchell" echoed within the Black Lives Matter movement.

Four employees of the hotel were fired following the incident, and the management company responsible for the employees told NPR they believed the guards involved in the incident should be terminated and face criminal charges.

Mitchell's death was deemed a homicide investigation by Milwaukee County District Attorney’s Office Milwaukee Police Department, announcing they "referr[ed] four individuals for felony murder charges."

District Attorney John Chisholm said in a statement. “Mr. Mitchell’s death is a tragedy, and we extend our deepest condolences to his family.”

Mitchell's funeral was held on July 11 at Holy Redeemer Institutional Church of God in Christ, Milwaukee, with Al Sharpton delivering a eulogy.

== Court reports ==
In August 2024, the four former hotel-workers were formally charged a party to felony murder in connection with D’Vontaye Mitchell’s death.

According to a criminal complaint, on June 30, 2024, the four hotel employees dragged Mitchell out of the Hyatt Hotel after Mitchell entered a women’s bathroom and held him on his stomach for eight or nine minutes in the death of D'Vontaye Mitchell.

The defendants named were security manager Todd Alan Erickson, 60; front desk agent Devin W. Johnson-Carson, 23; security guard Brandon LaDaniel Turner, 35; and bellman Herbert T. Williamson, 52, CNN reports.

Erickson requested a trial, while the other three men were scheduled for plea hearings. Williamson pleaded guilty to misdemeanor battery.

News outlets reported Three of the four men charged in the felony murder of D’Vontaye Mitchell had reached plea deals, according to online court records. "Turner, Johnson-Carter and Williamson have all reached plea deals," A February 2025 news report revealed. "Turner’s plea hearing is scheduled for March 6. Williamson’s plea hearing is scheduled for March 13. Johnson-Carson’s plea hearing is set for March 20."

Brandon Turner and Herbert Williamson entered their own plea deals. Williamson and Johnson-Carson each bonded out of jail on $5,000. Erickson will have a final pre-trial hearing that is currently set for June 27, 2025; his murder trial is scheduled for August 11, 2025.

On August 19, 2024, a settlement was announced between D'Vontaye Mitchell's family and Ambridge Hospitality, the third-party operator for Hyatt, with confidential terms.
