= Who Killed Tupac =

2017 American television documentary

Who Killed Tupac is an American documentary limited series on A&E, hosted by civil rights attorney Benjamin Crump and directed by Jason Sklaver. The six episode limited series is an in-depth investigation into key theories behind the assassination of the legendary rapper and actor Tupac Shakur. The series premiered on November 17, 2017, on A&E and the final episode was released on December 19, 2017. American rap artist The Game wrote the series' opening song, entitled "Heaven 4 a Gangster" in honor of Tupac.

== Background ==
Benjamin Crump has represented the families of Trayvon Martin, George Floyd, Michael Brown, Breonna Taylor, and many other victims of police brutality and/or gun violence.

Prior to her death in 2016, Tupac's mother, Afeni Shakur, expressed interest in having Crump analyze the circumstances of Tupac's death. Shakur, who went to high school with Crump's mother, contacted Crump after seeing his work with the family of Trayvon Martin. Shakur wanted to ensure that not only her son, but every young black male, was given due process under the law.

Throughout the series, Crump interviews various individuals to get crucial insight into Tupac's life and death, all in an effort to find Tupac's killer and explore how relevant this case is to today's social movements. After the final episode, Crump says "There is, I think, enough evidence for prosecutors in the Las Vegas metropolitan police to make a conclusion to give the family some peace of mind."

== Episodes ==
Episode No.	Title	Original air date	Details
1	Murder in Vegas / Crips vs Bloods	November 17, 2017	Crump recruits Stephanie Fredric (producer/reporter), Lolita Files (author), P. Frank Williams (producer/writer/director), Kevin Powell (activist/writer) and multiple friends, relatives, and experts to help him examine the last moments of Tupac's life. Crump interviews the LVMPD 1st responder, Chris Carroll, who was first on the scene that night and heard Tupac's last words. The team reviews the MGM security footage and identifies a possible suspect: Orlando Anderson.
2	Murder in Vegas / Crips vs Bloods	November 17, 2017	Crump and the team dives further into suspect Orlando Anderson's life and possible motives by interviewing those closest to him. Crump and his team meet with Behavioral Expert Sarah Michael Novia to analyze Orlando Anderson's body language during an exclusive interview. The LAPD and LVMPD each question the other police department's response to Tupac's murder.
3	East Coast vs West Coast	November 28, 2017	The East Coast v.s. West Coast rivalry is explored. The team looks at Tupac's relationship with other high-profile artists of the era like Sean Combs (P. Diddy) and Christopher Wallace (The Notorious B.I.G.). A confession from Duane Keith Davis "Keffe D" is examined for validity.
4	Devil in a Red Suit	December 5, 2017	Tupac's complicated relationship with Marion "Suge" Knight, the head of Death Row Records is examined. Possible motives for Suge Knight to orchestrate the murder of Tupac are reviewed, and Crump enlists weapons experts to recreate the shooting.
5	Death Row Takeover	December 12, 2017	Suge Knight's life and position at Death Row Records sheds light on another possible theory: an attempted take over of Death Row Records and their fortune. Crump and his team interview multiple new sources to rule out more theories.
6	Time For Justice	December 19, 2017	A confession letter and leaked confidential document is analyzed by Crump and his team. A mysterious gun is found. The final theories are ruled out and only one name remains.

== Impact ==
After the show's final episode, A&E contacted the LVPD regarding the gun found in Episode 6. According to The Independent, "some officers weren't sure if the gun was ever received while others definitively said it didn't get to them."

== Reception ==
Who Killed Tupac averages a 5.6/10 on IMDb reviews based on 209 user ratings.
