= Killing of Antonio Zambrano-Montes =

2015 police shooting in Pasco, Washington

Shooting of Antonio Zambrano-Montes
- Date: February 10, 2015
- Location: Pasco, Washington, U.S.
- Participants: Killed: Antonio Zambrano-Montes; Officers: Three Pasco Police Department officers
- Charges: None filed

The shooting of Antonio Zambrano-Montes occurred on February 10, 2015, in Pasco, Washington, United States. Zambrano, a 35-year-old man originally from Michoacán, Mexico, was shot and killed by three police officers after allegedly throwing rocks at cars and police officers. His hands were in the air when the police fired the shots. Police officers said one of the rocks was as large as a softball. A toxicology report conducted by police found Zambrano's blood tested positive for methamphetamine.

Zambrano-Montes' family initially filed a $4.8 million claim against the city of Pasco for the shooting, which they called an "execution", saying he "did not represent a threat of grievous bodily harm to anyone" at the time of his death. Two of the officers involved in the shooting were white, and one was Hispanic. The killing led to criticism by the Mexican government. with the country's President, Enrique Peña Nieto, condemning the officers' "disproportionate use of lethal force."

== Background ==
Zambrano-Montes was raised in Michoacán, Mexico, the third of sixteen children born to Jesús Montes and Agapita Montes-Rivera. In 2004, he immigrated to the United States to work in the orchards. He was married with two daughters. His wife had previously obtained a protection order against him alleging abuse. Zambrano-Montes was in the country illegally and did not speak English. He was arrested for assaulting a police officer in January 2014. The police stated that he had tried to grab an officer's pistol in the officer's holster as well as throwing objects at the officers and trying to strike them with a mailbox. He pleaded guilty in June 2014. Prior to the incident, he had spent some time in a homeless shelter and was "struggling emotionally" after being unable to work after an injury. According to police reports, the officers first tried to subdue him with voice commands and then with a Taser.

== Shooting ==
External videos
- Bystander video of Zambrano's death
- "Police shooting of Antonio Zambrano-Montes in Pasco, Washington", The Guardian via YouTube on YouTube

Three officers—Ryan Flanagan, Adam Wright and Adrian Alaniz—fired on Zambrano-Montes. Flanagan and Wright are white, and Alaniz is Hispanic. None of them were wearing body cameras. The shooting was caught on video by a civilian who recorded the incident from about 50 feet away showing Zambrano-Montes was running away from police, either with a rock in his hand or unarmed, and turned to face the officers before he was shot by them. Several weeks prior to the shooting, one of the officers, Adam Wright, had dragged Zambrano-Montes away from his burning rental home.

== Aftermath ==
The death of Zambrano-Montes led to criticism by the Mexican government with Mexico's Congress calling the shooting an "act that outrages all Mexicans" and the country's President, Enrique Peña Nieto, condemning the officers' "disproportionate use of lethal force." There were also mass protests in Pasco, with many protesters attending from outside the local community. The Tri-City Herald reported that "turmoil continued in Pasco nearly two weeks after the controversial shooting of Antonio Zambrano-Montes," as protests are not typically of this size in this town. A small ongoing presence of activists was present at the Pasco City Hall.

The three officers involved in the shooting were placed on paid administrative leave. As of February 16, "a multiagency investigation was underway". A local group, Consejo Latino, called for an additional investigation by the United States Department of Justice. There are 68 officers on the police force in Pasco, of whom 14 (21%) are Hispanic. Pasco is 56% Hispanic.

On February 26, a report indicated "The U.S. Attorney's office for Eastern Washington ... [had joined] the FBI in keeping track of the investigation."

As of February 27, 2015, reports indicated that seventeen shots had been fired; there were conflicting reports regarding as to whether autopsy results indicated the victim had been shot in the back. The medical examiner's analysis was expected to be complete in about a month's time; transcripts of witness statements were not expected to be available for several weeks. Zambrano-Montes's family commissioned a third autopsy conducted by forensic pathologist Werner Spitz. A federal mediator from the US Justice Department was dispatched in late March to help to mediate talks between the Pasco police department and local community groups who believe the shooting was unjustified while Zambrano-Montes' widow has called for the three officers to be charged with murder. A request to Governor Jay Inslee by Latino advocacy group Consejo Latino to remove Franklin County Prosecutor Shawn Sant from the investigation was refused, on the basis that prosecutors were obligated to fully investigate and prosecute crimes absent "very specific, tangible, and compelling reasons."

Shawn Sant—along with Michael C. Ormsby, United States Attorney for the Eastern District of Washington—declined to file charges against the three officers, stating that the officers acted in good faith and without malice. Ryan Flanagan left the police department in July 2015 while on administrative leave. The other two officers, Adam Wright and Adrian Alaniz, eventually returned to duty.

=== Civil lawsuit ===
In 2015, the family of Zambrano filed a $25 million claim in federal court against the city of Pasco claiming excessive force led to his death. The family hired civil rights attorney Benjamin Crump who also represented the family of Trayvon Martin in Sanford, Florida and the family of Michael Brown in Ferguson, Missouri; and Jose Baez, who represented Casey Anthony. The family later accepted a $700,000 settlement which was divided among Zambrano's two daughters, parents and widow.
