= Killing of Christian Hall =

2020 police killing of an Asian American man

- Hall (left), raising his hands whilst holding a pellet gun, moments before police (right) shot him
- Date: December 30, 2020
- Time: 1:38 p.m. EST
- Location: Route 33 in Bartonsville, Pennsylvania, U.S.
- Type: Shooting
- Deaths: Christian Hall

Christian Joseph Hall (October 31, 2001 – December 30, 2020) was a 19-year-old Chinese American man from Stroudsburg, Pennsylvania, who was shot and killed by Pennsylvania State troopers in neighboring Bartonsville, Pennsylvania, on December 30, 2020. The police had been responding to a report about Hall, who was suspected to be suicidal and found with a firearm. Though he appeared to surrender, Hall was shot after allegedly again picking the gun up from the ground after commands not to, then raising his arms while holding the gun.

== Background ==
Hall was born Chen Zhi Bo (Chinese: 陈志波) on October 31, 2001, in Shanghai, China. Shortly after his first birthday, he was adopted by Gareth J. Hall and Fe Hall, who are of African and Latino and Filipino descent respectively. He had his name officially changed to Christian Joseph Hall. As a child, he was diagnosed with reactive attachment disorder and later depression.

Hall had faced increasing mental health challenges due to the COVID-19 pandemic and was most recently affected by the loss of his usual therapy counsellor, followed by a break-up with his on-off girlfriend in October, after another man had threatened to kill himself over her.

== Incident ==
On December 30, 2020, Hall was dropped off at his workplace at a convenience store by his mother. He walked to an overpass of Pennsylvania Route 33 above Interstate 80 near mile marker 302A, and at 1:30 p.m., Hall called emergency services to report a "suicider", resulting in the arrival of police. Footage of the scene showed him pacing around and clutching what appears to be a gun. Initial reports said Hall placed it on the ground after being ordered to do so, and began negotiating with the officers, but soon picked it up again. Around 1:38 p.m., Hall was shot seven times by the troopers. Hall was carrying a pellet gun and allegedly picked it back up from the ground, after commands issued by the police. Hall, while still possessing the gun, began to raise his arms and hands when he was shot. He was taken to the Lehigh Valley Hospital-Pocono in East Stroudsburg, where he later died from his injuries.

== Investigation ==
Initial reports from authorities stated that when the officers told Hall to put the gun on the ground, he complied, but at one point during negotiations, he picked up the gun and pointed it in the direction of the police, causing them to shoot him. A video of the incident with evidence contradicting the claims surfaced in February 2021. The video shows Hall raising his hands before he is shot and falls.

Hall's adoptive parents were called into a Pennsylvania State Police barracks. They were informed of Hall's death by a call from Hall's ex-girlfriend during the wait for officers.

According to his family, Hall reported that he had been experiencing a mental health problem. Fe Hall told WNEP-TV, "He needed help. He was looking for help, but instead of getting help, he was killed in cold blood by those who were supposed to help him." Civil rights attorney Benjamin Crump also stated that Hall was in need of help and seemed to be contemplating suicide.

Hall's family started a petition to reopen the investigation of his shooting, with a goal of 150,000 signatures. On February 12, 2021, his death was protested by people outside the Philadelphia City Hall. Twitter users created the #JusticeforChristian hashtag after the video of the incident emerged.

In March 2021, Michael Mancuso, an assistant district attorney, called Hall's death a "classic suicide by cop scenario" at a news conference.

In November 2021, a new video was released which shows Hall holding the pellet gun with his hands raised at the time of his killing. The video is unblurred, unlike video previously released by the Monroe County district attorney, and was obtained through subpoena by a lawyer representing Hall's parents. The video shows that Hall kept his hands above his head for 14 seconds in all. The videos show that Hall’s hands were still in the air as two troopers fired a second series of shots which took his life.

On the first anniversary of Hall's death, memorials were held in nine U.S. cities, including Philadelphia, Downingtown, New York City, and Los Angeles, as well as Abra, Philippines.

In March 2022, Hall's parents filed a federal lawsuit for the wrongful death of their son. Hall's parents are represented by attorney Benjamin Crump.
