= List of killings by law enforcement officers in the United States, August 2020 =

This is a list of people reported killed by non-military law enforcement officers in the United States in August 2020, whether in the line of duty or not, and regardless of reason or method. The listing documents the occurrence of a death, making no implications regarding wrongdoing or justification on the part of the person killed or officer involved. Killings are arranged by date of the incident that caused death. Different death dates, if known, are noted in the description. The table below lists 102 people.

== August 2020 ==
Date	Name (age) of deceased	Race	State (city)	Description
2020-08-31	Dijon Kizzee (29)	African American	California (Westmont)	Kizzee was stopped for code violations related to his bike riding. Kizzee fled, and when officers reached him, a fight started during which Kizzee dropped the gun and clothes he was holding. When Kizzee bent down for his gun, deputies opened fire. Protests were held at the scene of the incident.
2020-08-31	Miguel Vega (26)	Hispanic/Latino	Illinois (Chicago)	According to Chicago police, officers returned fire after Vega shot at them. Vega's family disputes this.
2020-08-31	Robert Earl Jackson (54)	Black	Thorsby, AL	
2020-08-31	Marco Antonio Benito (36)	Hispanic	Aztec, NM	
2020-08-31	Arthur Zalman Ferrel (58)	Unknown race	Meridian, ID	
2020-08-30	Jesse David Nava (25)	Hispanic	Anaheim, CA	
2020-08-30	Nikolas Frazier (26)	White	Clovis, CA	
2020-08-29	Kurt Phelps	Unknown race	Loma, CO	
2020-08-29	Name Withheld (43)	Black	Dearborn Heights, MI	
2020-08-29	Michael Anthony Harris (44)	Black	Daytona Beach, FL	
2020-08-28	Jesus Alvarez Pulido (50)	Hispanic	San Bernardino, CA	
2020-08-28	Julio Cesar Moran-Ruiz (36)	Hispanic	Elkridge, MD	
2020-08-27	Damien Evans (38)	White	Salt Lake City, UT	
2020-08-26	Julius Paye Kehyei (29)	Black	Houston, TX	
2020-08-26	Simon Pancho (17)	Hispanic	Tucson, AZ	
2020-08-26	Leslie Hartman (46)	White	Denton, TX	
2020-08-25	Damian Daniels (30)	African American	Texas (San Antonio)	Police were called to Daniels' home for a mental health check, where they encountered Daniels wearing a gun in a holster. Daniels was agitated, and police "tried to de-escalate the situation for about 30 minutes...in an attempt to calm him down". Tasers were then deployed, and when Daniels reached for his gun he was shot by police.
2020-08-25	Charles Garland (30)	Unknown race	Gray, KY	
2020-08-25	Casper Brown (47)	Unknown race	Marshall, MI	
2020-08-25	Joey Middleton (41)	White	Gray, KY	
2020-08-24	David Sanchez	Hispanic	Albuquerque, NM	
2020-08-24	Corey Lee Cutler (31)	Unknown race	Lincolnton, NC	
2020-08-23	Gearil Leonard Williams (47)	Unknown race	Kingsland, GA	
2020-08-22	Mark Dawson Jr. (39)	Unknown race	Rancho Cucamonga, CA	
2020-08-22	Brandon R. Laducer (35)	Native American	Belcourt, ND	
2020-08-22	Christopher Walker (29)	Unknown race	Rancho Cordova, CA	
2020-08-22	Michael Higgins (22)	White	Greenville, NC	
2020-08-21	Scott Huffman (42)	White	Nipomo, CA	
2020-08-21	Hasani Best (39)	Black	Asbury Park, NJ	
2020-08-21	Trayford Pellerin (31)	African American	Louisiana (Lafayette)	Pellerin was shot and killed by police while trying to enter a convenience store allegedly armed with a knife. A witness's cell phone video of the shooting was published on social media.
2020-08-20	Cesar Sanchez Ruiz (36)	Hispanic	Bakersfield, CA	
2020-08-20	Name Withheld	Unknown race	Brooksville, FL	
2020-08-20	Shiloh D. Smith (35)	White	Amity, MO	
2020-08-20	Nathan Harrington (43)	White	Driftwood, TX	
2020-08-20	Jeffrey Wratten (37)	White	Cabot, AR	
2020-08-19	Samuel Mata (21)	Hispanic	San Benito, TX	
2020-08-19	Jack Lamar Harris (60)	White	Chickamauga, GA	
2020-08-19	Ronald Stuart Chipman (39)	Unknown race	Lake Havasu City, AZ	
2020-08-18	Trevor Edwards (38)	Unknown race	Pollocksville, NC	
2020-08-18	Erik Jon Perez	White	Bay City, TX	
2020-08-18	Adrian Jason Roberts (37)	Black	Hope Mills, NC	
2020-08-17	Everardo Gonzalez Santana	Hispanic	Bakersfield, CA	
2020-08-17	Jimmy Ferrer (35)	White	Barstow, CA	
2020-08-17	Santos Anthony Villegas (36)	Hispanic	San Bernardino, CA	
2020-08-17	Marco Antonio Sigala Jr. (27)	Hispanic	Weslaco, TX	
2020-08-17	Keith Allen Fileger (34)	White	Avon Park, FL	
2020-08-16	Jeffrey Hubbard	White	Las Vegas, NV	
2020-08-16	Jose Manuel Castro (27)	Hispanic	Dos Palos, CA	
2020-08-16	Name Withheld (30)	Unknown race	Hemet, CA	
2020-08-16	Thomas Moles (35)	White	Theta, TN	
2020-08-15	Donald Timothy Miller (49)	Unknown race	Guerneville, CA	
2020-08-15	Rick Lee Miller (52)	White	Ocala, FL	
2020-08-15	Anthony McClain (32)	African American	California (Pasadena)	McClain was shot and killed by Pasadena police after fleeing a traffic stop. According to police, McClain ran into the street pulling a firearm from the waistband of his pants. A witness said McClain threw the gun before he was shot.
2020-08-15	Kendrell Antron Watkins (31)	Black	Tuscaloosa, AL	
2020-08-15	William Wallace	Unknown race	Denver, CO	
2020-08-15	Fred John Henry Arcera (41)	Unknown race	Oak Ridge, TN	
2020-08-14	Derick Manuel Bonilla (39)	Hispanic	Phoenix, AZ	
2020-08-14	Joshua Gay (28)	White	Fort Lauderdale, FL	
2020-08-14	Name Withheld	Unknown race	North Miami, FL	
2020-08-14	Daniel Rivera (37)	Hispanic	Los Angeles, CA	
2020-08-13	Rafael Jevon Minniefield (29)	Black	Moreland, GA	
2020-08-11	Lyana Gilmore (48)	Unknown race	Pueblo, CO	
2020-08-11	Name Withheld	Unknown race	Tulsa, OK	
2020-08-11	Kenneth Reiss (50)	White	Albuquerque, NM	
2020-08-10	Americo C. Reyes Jr. (40)	Hispanic	Grand Island, NE	
2020-08-10	Robert Land (45)	Unknown race	Casper, WY	
2020-08-10	Jose Vallejos (48)	Hispanic	Albuquerque, NM	
2020-08-10	Joshua Squires (32)	Caucasian	Nevada (Las Vegas)	Squires, who was being searched for in connection to an arson nearby ran from Officer Raul Cabrera, led the officer on a foot pursuit and then entered his parents' home and held a woman hostage. During the foot pursuit, Squires fired a handgun round at Cabrera, but the bullet missed him. Cabrera eventually lost sight of Squires, and other officers had to locate Squires, and while patrolling, they located him, in the house. There were multiple people inside the house at this time. SWAT officers were called, and during the confrontation Squires was killed by gunfire. No one in the house, nor any officers were injured or killed. It was also stated that Squires suffered from a history of mental illness.
2020-08-10	Chris Minor (38)	White	Robbins, NC	
2020-08-09	Ryan Shane Hinojo (26)	Hispanic	El Paso, TX	
2020-08-09	Angela Parks	White	Chicago, IL	On August 9, 2020, Angela Parks was hit by a police car and was afterwards left quadriplegic and died 18 months later in February 2022. Parks' family then sued the city of Chicago, alleging that Officer Ricardo Teneyuque was chasing the SUV because he believed it had been stolen, despite a Chicago Police Department policy prohibiting officers from pursuing vehicles when a stolen car is the most serious suspected crime involved On February 6, 2025, her family accepted a $27 million settlement from the city of Chicago, which awaits approval from the Chicago City Council. Upon approval, $20 million of the settlement would be paid through the city taxpayer money, while $7 million would be paid through the city's insurance provider.
2020-08-09	Earl Barton Jr. (42)	White	Tulsa, OK	
2020-08-09	Donald Anderson (39)	Unknown race	Graham, WA	
2020-08-08	Johnathan Randell (25)	White	Tulsa, OK	
2020-08-08	Aaron Michael Griffin (21)	White	Clinton, UT	
2020-08-08	Jonathan Jefferson	Black	Bossier City, LA	
2020-08-08	Matthew Hilbelink (39)	White	Holladay, UT	
2020-08-08	Terry Treleven	White	St. Croix Falls, WI	
2020-08-07	Nicholas Kocolis (51)	White	Dover, FL	
2020-08-07	Anthony Budduke (26)	Unknown race	West Alton, MO	
2020-08-07	Jeffery Monroy (Jefferey Alexander Monroy Perez)	Hispanic	Rancho Mirage, CA	
2020-08-07	Jeffrey Scott Haarsma (55)	White	St. Petersburg, FL	
2020-08-07	Alex Rusanovskiy (31)	White	Los Angeles, CA	
2020-08-07	Melvin Salaythis (22)	African American	Florida (Orange County)	Salaythis, a legally armed man, was shot in the back after running from a deputy. The Footage of the shooting was partially caught on video via the body camera of another officer who had been responding to the call. However, upon arrival, Salaythis already had been shot. Upon release of the uninvolved officer's bodycamera footage, the usage of the racial slur was confirmed. The officer involved had also been in plain clothes, and the officer claimed that Salaythis's hand had been in his waistband, where the gun was.
2020-08-07	Julian Edward Roosevelt Lewis (60)	African American	Georgia (Screven County)	Lewis was shot and killed by former Georgia state trooper Jacob Gordon Thompson (active-duty at the time of the incident) after fleeing a traffic stop. Thompson forced Lewis's car into a ditch, then fired a single shot that struck Lewis, killing him while he was still in the vehicle. Thompson has been charged with felony murder and aggravated assault.
2020-08-06	Amir Johnson (30)	Black	Ventnor, NJ	
2020-08-06	Vasquinho Bettencourt (35)	Hispanic	Oakland, CA	
2020-08-06	Name Withheld	Unknown race	Ontario, CA	
2020-08-05	Roberto Hernandez Jr. (29)	Hispanic	San Angelo, TX	
2020-08-04	Ramon Timothy Lopez (28)	Hispanic/Latino	Arizona (Phoenix)	Lopez was held by force by a policeman on the ground for six minutes, after which he received burns from the hot asphalt, shortly after which he died. Lopez was also found to have purple streaks on his back.
2020-08-04	Andrew S. Gwynn (30)	tbd	Utah (Kearns)	Gwynn was stopped while walking down the street during a routine contact at 5 a.m. Before the police officer could check his identification, Gwynn ran away from the officer. During his flight, Gwynn pointed a gun at the officer and was shot.
2020-08-04	David Lee Rigg (44)	Caucasian/White	Ohio (Warren)	After receiving a 911 report that a man was beating a woman in front of her children, officers were dispatched to Rigg's house. He initially was seen in his front door carrying a weapon, but retreated back into his house. A crisis response team was called in, and Rigg indicated to them that he "[wanted] suicide by cop". Two hours after the standoff began, Rigg was shot in his kitchen.
2020-08-04	Ashton Broussard (30)	Black	Houston, TX	
2020-08-04	Christopher Lawings (67)	Unknown race	James Island, SC	
2020-08-04	Melissa Halda (39)	Unknown race	Fort Dodge, IA	
2020-08-04	David James Pruitte (36)	White	Port Orchard, WA	
2020-08-03	Jesse Lee Vanloozen	White	Culver City, CA	
2020-08-02	Christopher Kimmons Craven (38)	Caucasian/White	North Carolina (Mooresville)	Mooresville Police Shooting being investigated by SBI. Report pending. Craven had no criminal record. Original 911 call reported domestic incident with Craven threatening suicide.
2020-08-02	Cyrus D. Carpenter (17)	tbd	Utah (West Jordan)	After being pulled over in a stolen truck, Carpenter exited the vehicle and shot a police officer in the shoulder. Officers returned fire and killed Carpenter.
2020-08-02	Adrean Stephenson (63)	Caucasian/White	Florida (Sarasota)	Stephenson, who suffered from Alzheimers and dementia, grabbed a knife while in the presence of her daughter and son-in-law. Officers responded to a domestic battery call and found Stephenson outside with the knife pressed to her own throat. She would not drop the knife, and officers first tasered and then shot her.
2020-08-01	Russell Van Liddell (73)	White	Stanley, ID	
2020-08-01	James Justin Munro Jr. (56)	White	Homestead, FL	

== See also ==
- Death in custody § United States
- Henry A. Wallace Police Crime Public Database
- List of cases of police brutality
- List of countries with annual rates and counts for killings by law enforcement officers
- List of law enforcement officers killed in the line of duty in the United States
- List of law enforcement officers convicted for an on-duty killing in the United States
- List of shootings by US immigration agents
- List of police reforms related to the George Floyd protests
- List of unarmed African Americans killed by law enforcement officers in the United States
- Lists of killings by law enforcement officers
- Police brutality in the United States
- Police misconduct § United States
- Police riot § United States
- Police use of deadly force in the United States
