= Killing of Hunter Brittain =

Police killing of unarmed teen in Cabot, Arkansas

- Location: Near Cabot, Arkansas, U.S.
- Date: June 23, 2021; 5 years ago c. 3:00 a.m. (CDT)
- Attack type: Child homicide by shooting, police killing
- Victims: Hunter Brittain, aged 17
- Perpetrator: Michael Davis
- Charges: Manslaughter; Negligent homicide
- Verdict: Not guilty of manslaughter; Guilty of negligent homicide
- Sentence: 1 year in jail plus $1,000 fine

At approximately 3:00 am (CDT) on Wednesday, June 23, 2021, 17-year-old Hunter Brittain, who was unarmed, was fatally shot by Lonoke County sheriff's deputy Sgt. Michael Davis near Cabot, Arkansas, United States. He later died at North Little Rock Hospital.

== Killing ==
Brittain was attempting to use a jug of antifreeze to stop his truck from rolling into the officer's vehicle when the deputy shot him. Brittain's family claimed he was test driving a truck, which he had been working on when he was pulled over by the deputy.

== Aftermath ==
The body camera of the deputy was turned over to Arkansas State Police. The camera was not on during the shooting. Davis was fired for leaving his body cam off until after Brittain was shot.

The death of Brittain inspired protests. Attorneys Ben Crump and Devon Jacob are representing Brittain's family. At a memorial for Brittain, he was eulogized by Reverend Al Sharpton.

Brittain's family and friends have proposed "Hunter's Law". The law would require all Arkansas police officers to wear a body camera which would be kept turned on during their shift.

Davis was found guilty at trial in March 2022 of negligent homicide, but not guilty of manslaughter and was sentenced to one year in jail plus a $1,000 fine. One year in jail is the maximum sentence for negligent homicide in Arkansas. However, Davis appealed his conviction and was released until a decision could made on the appeal. Controversy emerged in August 2023 after Davis was seen greeting elementary school students. In September 2023, the Arkansas Court of Appeals upheld Davis' conviction in a 3-0 ruling Despite the fact that Davis could've asked the Supreme Court of Arkansas to review the Court of Appeals decision, it was acknowledged that the Court of Appeals decision paved the way for him to begin serving his sentence.
