= Killing of Corey Ruiz =

2026 homicide in Wisconsin, U.S.

- Date: July 22, 2026
- Time: c. 1:30 p.m. (CDT)
- Location: Madison, Wisconsin, US
- Deaths: 1 (Ruiz)

Corey Ruiz was a 37-year-old man who was shot and killed by police in Madison, Wisconsin, on July 22, 2026.

The shooting happened at the corner of Williamson and Baldwin Streets. Ruiz was taken to a local hospital, where he died from his injuries.

The Wisconsin Department of Justice Division of Criminal Investigation will investigate the incident. All four officers involved were placed on administrative leave.

On November 19, 2026, Dane County district attorney Ismael Ozanne have announced that one of the officer who shot Ruiz named Kiel Baitinger-Peterson would not face any charges in relation to his death.

== Background ==
Madison is the second largest city of Wisconsin and the state capitol of Wisconsin. It is home to the University of Wisconsin–Madison. In 2021, the state of Wisconsin recorded 64 instances of use-of-force or arrest-related injuries and deaths. This increased to 73 in 2022 and 91 in 2023 before declining to 81 in 2024. During the first three months of 2026, the city of Madison recorded 94 instances in which officers used force. From 2021 to 2024, Madison Police Department officers discharged their weapons four times, resulting in injuries in two instances.

== Sequence of events ==
External videos
- NBC News analysis of video footage

At roughly 1:30 p.m. in the Marquette neighborhood of Madison, police received reports of a man stealing bicycles and looking into parked cars. Four police officers then approached 38-year-old Corey Ruiz, a Black man who fled on a bicycle through backyards after officers confronted him. Ruiz fell from the bicycle after an officer quickly exited his vehicle and knocked Ruiz to the ground, where a physical struggle began between Ruiz and police as bystanders recorded from nearby. Ruiz produced a knife that Madison Police Chief John Patterson reported injured the officer who fired the shots. One female officer is heard yelling out "Taser! Taser! Taser!" before two officers fired tasers at Ruiz. Police reported that one taser was not successful, while the other taser, fired by a female officer, successfully connected and brought Ruiz the to ground. Two officers restrained Ruiz on the ground. While Ruiz was being held to the ground by these two officers, a third officer, identified as Kiel Baitinger-Peterson, drew his weapon and shot Ruiz three times at close range, killing him. Bystanders from nearby began yelling, and officers then retrieved the knife.

The Madison Police Department is not outfitted with police body cameras.

== Reactions ==
NBC News said "a central question now is why lethal force was used when officers appeared to have Ruiz on the ground."

The killing sparked protests and vigils in Madison, with many protesters calling on the city to release the name of the officer who shot Ruiz.

Madison Police Chief John Patterson held a press conference on July 23, 2026, in which he said there would be an investigation of the shooting, but did not release the names of any of the officers, including the man who fired the shots. While he was talking, a group of over a dozen protesters entered the news conference and took control of the microphone. After protesters stepped away from the microphone, Patterson said "everyone in this room can feel the thinness of trust in this city right now." Patterson said the killing was being investigated as a homicide, and the four officers involved had been put on administrative leave pending the investigation. On August 10, Chief Patterson revealed that the officer who fired the shots was Kiel Baitinger-Peterson, who has worked for the Madison Police Department since 2015.

Governor Tony Evers called for protesters to remain peaceful and respectful. Madison resident and candidate in the 2026 Wisconsin gubernatorial primary Francesca Hong, who was then the area's state representative stated "This was an execution, and it never should have happened."

Ruiz's family has retained attorney Benjamin Crump, who stated that the officer involved in the shooting should be criminally charged.

== Williamson Street Encampment: July 22 - August 4th ==
Shortly after the Ruiz's death, several city blocks were barricaded at the site of the shooting, centering around the intersection of Williamson Street and South Baldwin Street. Over the coming days, the barricaded city blocks continued to host protests and rallies, and eventually became referred to as an "autonomous zone" by local activists. While the barricades were up, the zone was occupied and operated continuously by local volunteer activist groups. The zone featured temporary infrastructural efforts, including portable toilets, dumpsters, food preparation, and hair care for occupants. The city denied supplying any of these resources to the zone. Over the course of the encampment, the zone became increasingly occupied by the local unhoused population.

"Every day, the City's Community Development Division has worked closely with City-contracted street outreach agencies and others on site to identify and connect with vulnerable unsheltered persons. City resources have been made available to the agencies to allow them to secure short-term hotel accommodations for about 25-30 people, including 4-5 families with children. Some people have declined those offers." - Mayor Rhodes-Conway (August 2nd)

The zone's civil unrest led to the temporary closure of many of the surrounding businesses, all of which were independent, locally owned, or co-ops. After a week, Mayor Satya Rhodes-Conway urged protesters to dismantle the barricades voluntarily, warning of an "unsafe and unsustainable" situation.

"There is real harm being done to local businesses and residents in the Marquette Neighborhood. We are hearing from neighbors who are losing income and even jobs, and who will not be able to make rent. We are hearing from employees who are being laid off and businesses that are on the verge of closing permanently. Those who are dismissing or downplaying these concerns are not helping to advance a just cause; they are dividing our city at a time when we need to come together more than ever." - Mayor Rhodes-Conway (August 2nd)

Police and city workers at the intersection of Williamson and Baldwin on August 4th at 8:00 am

When no agreement was reached for voluntary dismantlement, local and state police were dispatched to clear the encampment. At 4:45 am on August 4, city workers and police arrived to the scene, issuing a verbal warning to remove personal belongings. By 9:00 am, the City of Madison reported that the intersection had been reopened, with at least 16 people arrested for "unlawful assembly and obstructing an officer."

Clashes continued between remaining protesters and police throughout the night of August 4 and until the morning of August 5th. Authorities reported six more arrests after several fires were set on Williamson and Baldwin streets. All fires were extinguished within 20 minutes of firefighters arriving and no injuries were reported. By August 6, up to 22 people had been arrested during the clearing of the encampment. Items seized during the cleanup were taken to a city park for owners to claim. During the clearing, a reported 65 unhoused adults from the encampment were provided a week of hotel accommodations provided by the city.

Despite claims from the activists who occupied the zone, Corey Ruiz's family denies organizing or endorsing the encampment.

“We ask everyone at that corner and everyone wearing a badge to keep this peaceful. No one else should be hurt in Corey’s name.” - Ruiz’s family statement (August 5th)

Mayor Rhodes-Conway stated that efforts to end the encampment peacefully were complicated by a lack of central leader or spokesperson for those occupying the zone.

“What is deeply regrettable is that many vulnerable people were caught in the middle, which is why the City spent considerable time and effort finding emergency solutions — efforts that succeeded in helping dozens of unsheltered people and families,” - Mayor Rhodes-Conway

Madison Police released drone footage on August 4 showing a physical confrontation between officers and independent police monitor Aeiramique Glass, in which Glass was interfering with police activity before being briefly restrained. She sustained minor injuries before being released without charges.
