= Killing of Julian Lewis =

August 2020 police killing in Screven County, Georgia

- Date: August 7, 2020
- Location: Screven County, Georgia, US; 32.618349°N 81.661500°W
- Suspects: Jacob Gordon Thompson
- Charges: Felony murder, aggravated assault

On August 7, 2020, Julian Edward Roosevelt Lewis, an unarmed 60-year-old American carpenter, was fatally shot by Georgia State Patrol officer Jacob Gordon Thompson, on a rural road in Screven County, Georgia. Thompson attempted to stop Lewis for driving a vehicle with a broken tail light. When Lewis failed to stop, Thompson performed a PIT maneuver to force Lewis's car into a ditch and shot Lewis once in the face. On August 14, Thompson was charged with felony murder.

== People involved ==
Lewis was a 60-year-old Black semi-retired carpenter from Sylvania, Georgia.

Thompson, who is white, was 27 years old at the time of the shooting. He joined the Georgia State Police on July 28, 2013.

== Traffic stop ==
According to a Georgia State Patrol (GSP) report, around 9 p.m. on Friday, August 7, 2020, Thompson attempted to stop Lewis's Nissan Sentra for a broken taillight on Stoney Pond Road near Sylvania, Georgia, in a rural part of Screven County about 60 miles northwest of Savannah. According to a Lewis family attorney, Lewis had gone to a convenience store to buy a grape soda for his wife and was on his way home at the time. Lewis did not stop and Thompson briefly chased Lewis down several rural roads. Thompson forced Lewis's car to stop in a ditch using a "precision intervention technique" or "PIT maneuver".

According to Thompson's report of the incident, after Lewis's vehicle stopped, Thompson pulled up alongside and drew his handgun as he exited. Lewis revved his car's engine and Thompson activated the light on his gun. Thompson saw Lewis with both hands on the steering wheel, "wrenching the steering wheel in an aggressive back-and-forth manner towards me and my patrol vehicle." Thompson wrote that Lewis "was trying to use his vehicle to injure me" and that, "Being in fear for my life and safety, I discharged my weapon once." According to prosecutors, Thompson fired one shot "at some point", striking Lewis in the face and killing him. According to an attorney for Lewis's family, Thompson shot Lewis "almost immediately" after the PIT maneuver.

Thompson reported that he unsuccessfully tried to help Lewis after shooting him. Lewis was pronounced dead at the scene. Thompson was not injured.

According to their attorney, Lewis's family did not learn about his whereabouts or death until around 1 a.m. the next day.

== Prosecution ==
Thompson was fired, arrested, and charged with felony murder and aggravated assault on August 14, 2020. He was booked into Screven County Jail.

An autopsy of Lewis's body is being conducted by the Georgia Bureau of Investigation.

The case went to a grand jury and on June 28, 2021, the case was judged a “no bill” and all charges against Thompson were dropped.

== Impact ==
A candlelight vigil was held for Lewis on August 14 in front of Sylvania City Hall with funeral services held the following day.

According to the Associated Press, Thompson "was charged amid a national outcry over racial injustice" after the recent murders of George Floyd and Ahmaud Arbery, and the killing of Rayshard Brooks at the hands of police. Lewis's family attorney described the decision to fire and arrest Thompson only a week after Lewis's death as a surprise, which he believed was a direct result of protests surrounding the police murder of Floyd and killing of Breonna Taylor earlier in 2020. The Georgia NAACP described the killing as "a case of racial profiling".

The State of Georgia paid $4.8 million to the widow and survivors of Mr. Lewis to resolve the civil rights claims. The settlement is the largest civil rights settlement paid by the State of Georgia. The Atlanta, Georgia law firm Hall & Lampros, LLP represented Mr. Lewis's family.

== See also ==
- List of unarmed African Americans killed by law enforcement officers in the United States
- Lists of killings by law enforcement officers in the United States
