= John T. Boland =

American Catholic priest and academic administrator

The Reverend John Boland C.S.C.

4th President of University of Portland
- In office 1914–1919
- Preceded by: Joseph Gallagher
- Succeeded by: Eugene P. Burke

5th and 7th President of St. Edward's University
- In office 1909–1914
- Preceded by: Patrick Carroll
- Succeeded by: Emiel DeWulf
- In office 1899–1907
- Preceded by: Peter Klein
- Succeeded by: Patrick Carroll

Personal details
- Born: June 13, 1867 Cincinnati, Ohio, U.S.
- Died: September 28, 1924 (aged 57) Deming, New Mexico, U.S.

John T. Boland, C.S.C. (June 13, 1867 – September 28, 1924), was an American Catholic priest and academic administrator who served as president of St. Edward's University in Austin, Texas, and the University of Portland in Oregon.

== Early life ==
John Boland was born in Cincinnati, Ohio, on June 13, 1867, to James Joseph Boland and Catherine Frawley Boland, recent Irish immigrants from County Limerick. By the age of 17, Boland had relocated to Indiana and begun studying at the University of Notre Dame.

== Career ==
Boland was ordained to the priesthood on July 13, 1892, and entered the Congregation of Holy Cross. He celebrated his first mass at the Cathedral of St. Peter in Chains (Note: Elevated to a minor basilica by Pope Francis in 2020.) in Cincinnati. He spent the first years of his priesthood at Notre Dame, where he worked as a rector. He also served for a time as vice president of Sacred Heart College (Note: Now defunct. The campus was sold in 1968 and now serves as the location of Maranatha Baptist University.) in Watertown, Wisconsin.

In 1899, Boland was sent to Austin, Texas. He was appointed the fifth president of St. Edward's College, (present-day St. Edward's University). Some of the most significant events in the history of St. Edward's happened during his presidency, including a massive fire in 1903 that largely destroyed Nicholas J. Clayton's monumental 1888 Main Building. Boland oversaw the reconstruction of this building and the adjacent construction of a similarly-styled dormitory, Holy Cross Hall. Both of these structures would later be added to the National Register of Historic Places in 1973.

By 1907, Boland was in ill health. He attributed this to a serious fall off a runaway horse, as well as stress caused by the aftermath of the 1903 campus fire. He resigned as president and left Texas to seek different climates in hopes of recovering. He went first to New Orleans, Louisiana, to serve at Holy Cross College (now the University of Holy Cross), and then again to Watertown, where he served for a time as pastor of St. Bernard's Church. Despite his efforts, he would suffer from health problems for the rest of his life.

During Boland's absence, Rev. Patrick Carroll, CSC, served as the sixth president of St. Edward's. (Note: Carroll would later serve as vice president of the University of Notre Dame from 1926-29.) Carroll had previously served as president of Sacred Heart College in Watertown, another former workplace of Boland's. After his second year at St. Edward's, Carroll resigned for personal reasons. Boland would resume the office immediately thereafter, becoming the only (Note: as of 2026) president in the history of St. Edward's to serve multiple terms. His second term saw increased development of the institution, as well as changes precipitated by the ripple effects of the Mexican Revolution and the uneasy lead-up to World War I.

Boland was appointed the fourth president of Columbia University (the present-day University of Portland) in Portland, Oregon, in 1914. He shepherded Columbia through the eventful Great War period, resigning in 1919.

== Later life and death ==
Amid continuing illness, Boland returned to Notre Dame in 1919. He left in August of 1924 for a sanitorium in Deming, New Mexico, in what would be a final attempt to restore his health. He died there on September 28.
