= Robert Hilliard (disambiguation) =

Robert Hilliard (1904–1937) was an Olympic boxer, Irish republican, Church of Ireland minister and communist.

Robert Hilliard may also refer to:

- Robert C. Hilliard (actor) (1857–1927), American stage actor
- Robert C. Hilliard (attorney), American civil rights and personal injury attorney
- Robert L. Hilliard (born 1925), American WWII veteran, activist, playwright, author, and communications professor

== See also ==
- Bob Hilliard (Hilliard Goldsmith), American lyricist
