= Stuessy =

Stuessy is a surname. Notable people with the surname include:

- Dwight Stuessy (1906–1957), American basketball coach
- Mel Stuessy (1901–1980), American football player
- Tod Falor Stuessy (born 1943), American botanist
