= Robert C. Hilliard (attorney) =

American lawyer

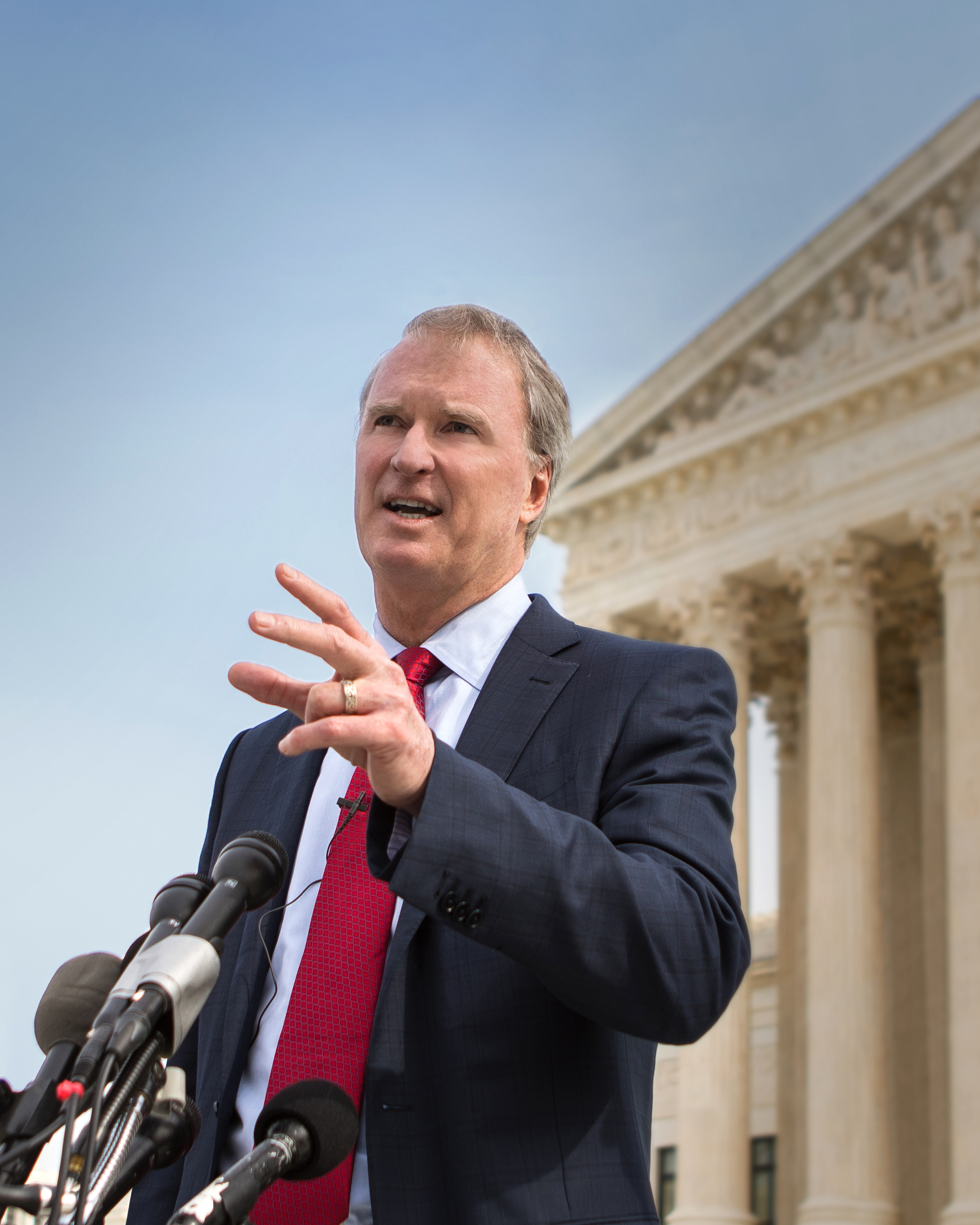
- Other name: Bob Hilliard
- Education: St. Edward's University; St. Mary's University School of Law
- Occupation: Attorney
- Years active: 1983–present
- Known for: Motor vehicle liability litigation
- Website: https://hmglawfirm.com/

Robert C. Hilliard is an American civil rights and personal injury attorney notable for his United States Supreme Court argument in Hernandez vs. Mesa seeking to hold a border patrol agent accountable for the cross border shooting of a Mexican national, Sergio Hernandez. He also was appointed and served as the nation's lead lawyer for personal injury victims in the General Motors ignition switch recalls litigation, one of the largest civil litigations in the country's history.

== Early life ==
Hilliard grew up in Newton, Texas, the youngest of three children. His father, Delmar Shelley Hilliard, was an Air Force A-1 Skyraider fighter pilot who flew 175 missions in Vietnam, and later became Newton's county attorney for 25 years. His mother, Bobbye Clifton Hilliard, was an artist, newspaper reporter, homemaker, and office manager for her husband's law office.

Robert C. Hilliard attended St. Edward's University in Austin, Texas, where he enrolled on a tennis scholarship, graduating summa cum laude with a bachelor's degree in English literature in 1980. In 2016, he was given St. Edward's Distinguished Alumni Award. He went on to attend St. Mary's University School of Law, in San Antonio, Texas, graduating with honors in 1983.

== Career ==
In 1985, Hilliard founded The Law Offices of Robert C. Hilliard. It later became Hilliard Muñoz, until 2010 when Rudy Gonzales joined and the law firm became Hilliard Muñoz Gonzales, LLP, all based in Corpus Christi, Texas. Hilliard received his certification from the Texas Board of Legal Specialization in Personal Injury Trial Law in 1990 and Civil Trial Law in 1992.

In 2012, Hilliard and Steve Shadowen co-founded Hilliard & Shadowen, LLP, in Austin, Texas, a law firm that engages in antitrust and civil rights litigation.

In 2017, the firm Hilliard Muñoz Gonzales, LLP became Hilliard Martinez Gonzales, LLP in when founding partner Jacobo Munoz retired, and John Martinez was made managing partner. In 2020, they opened an office in Chicago, IL.

In 2023, Hilliard Martinez Gonzales became Hilliard Law.

== Notable cases ==
=== Icon Park/Tyre Sampson ===
On March 24, 2022, Tyre Sampson, a 14-year-old boy, fell from a ride at Icon Park, an amusement park in Orlando, Florida. His parents hired attorneys Ben Crump and Bob Hilliard after their son fell to his death. Sampson's mother, Nekia Dodd, retained Hilliard, while his father, Yarnell Sampson, retained attorney Ben Crump. On February 6, 2023, the Orlando FreeFall owner reached a settlement to begin dismantling the ride after Sampson’s death. In May, 2023, the Florida Legislature passed the "Tyre Sampson Act".

=== Hernández vs. Mesa ===
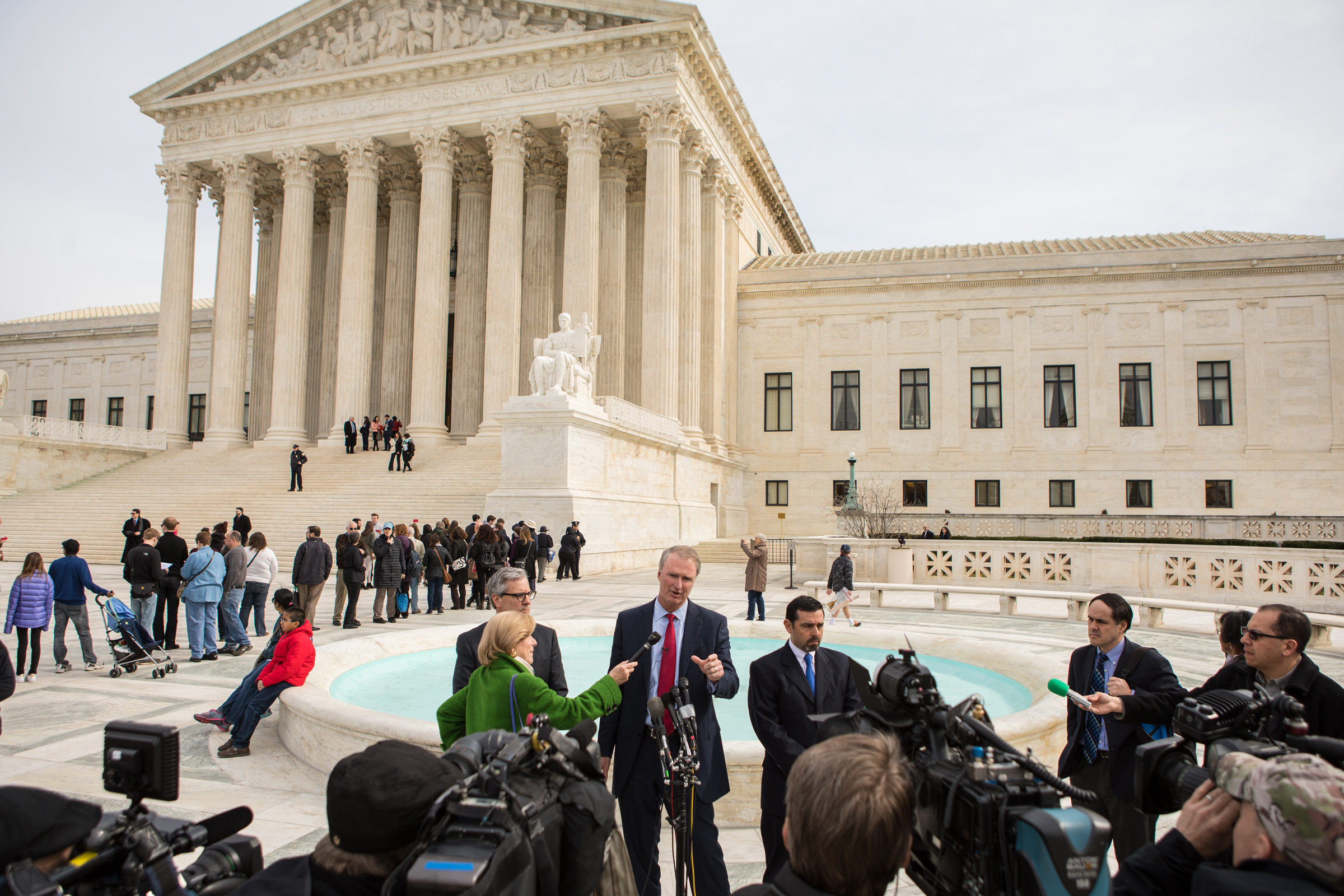
Hilliard speaks to reporters outside the Supreme Court

Hilliard represented the family of Sergio Hernández, an unarmed 15-year-old Mexican citizen who was shot and killed by a U.S. Border Patrol agent in 2010. The court found in favor of Mesa. Hernández was standing on Mexican soil when shot. The cases led to a confrontation between former Mexican President Felipe Calderón and former U.S. Secretary of State Hillary Clinton.

=== GM Ignition Switch Litigation ===
Hilliard was appointed by Federal Judge Jesse Furman of the Southern District of New York as co-lead counsel in the National General Motors (GM) ignition switch litigation. Hilliard represented 326 clients with liability claims, of which 53 involved a fatality, and helped negotiate GM’s $575 million settlement to resolve over half of all claims in the multidistrict litigation and a shareholder class action.

=== Koua Fong Lee exoneration and Toyota litigation ===
Bob Hilliard represented Koua Fong Lee, a Hmong immigrant who was wrongfully convicted of vehicular homicide following a 2006 crash involving his 1996 Toyota Camry in St. Paul, Minnesota. Lee’s vehicle accelerated uncontrollably down an off-ramp and collided with another car, killing three people and injuring two others. Although Lee maintained his innocence, he was convicted and sentenced to eight years in prison. Years later, after widespread reports of sudden unintended acceleration in Toyota vehicles surfaced, Hilliard and attorney Brent Schafer worked with the Great North Innocence Project and law students at the University of Minnesota to gather new evidence showing that a mechanical defect had likely caused the crash. Lee’s conviction was vacated in 2010 after nearly three years of incarceration, and prosecutors declined to retry the case.

Hilliard later represented Lee in a civil lawsuit against Toyota, securing an $11.4 million jury verdict – the largest known verdict at the time involving Toyota’s unintended acceleration claims. For his work on the case, Hilliard received the "Never Forgotten" Award from the Great North Innocence Project.

== Philanthropy ==
In May 2017, the Hilliard's donated $1 million to Incarnate Word Academy in Corpus Christi, Texas for a new, 14,000-square-foot elementary level Montessori building.
