= Patrick Mason (economist) =

Professor of economics

Patrick Leon Mason
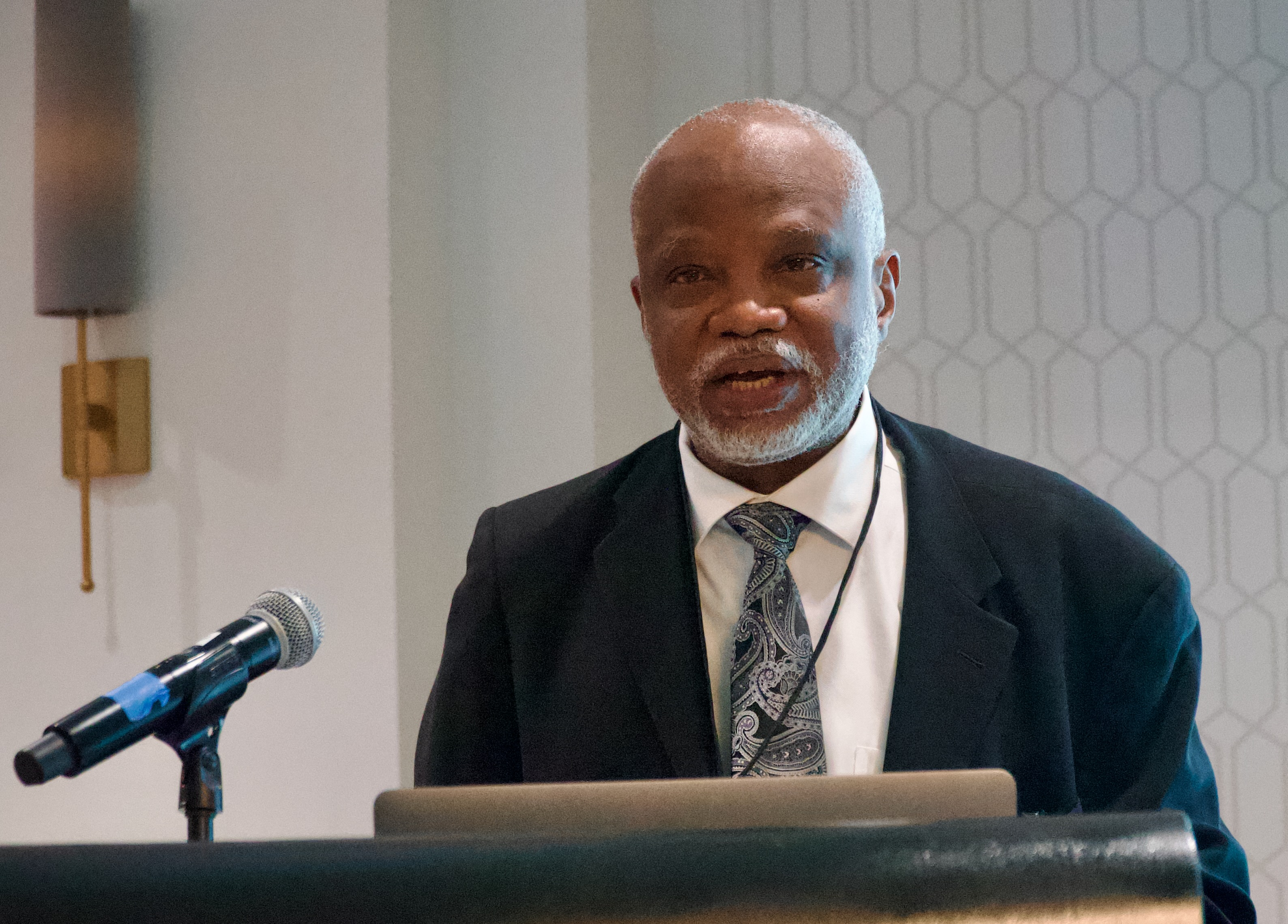
- Born: Tallahassee, Florida

Academic background
- Education: The New School (PhD); University of Michigan; St. Edward's University (BA), 1979
- Website: Information at IDEAS / RePEc

Patrick Leon Mason is an American economist who is a professor of economics at the University of Massachusetts - Amherst.

== Education and early life ==
Mason was born in Tallahassee, Florida, and raised in Sebring, Florida, where he began manual labor as an agricultural field worker at the age of 4. He attended St. Edward's University in Austin, Texas on a College Assistance Migrant Program (CAMP) scholarship. As a graduate student in economics at the University of Michigan, he observed the better conditions of manual laborers in Michigan who were represented by unions, but found traditional economic theory did not fit his lived experience of the labor market. He completed his PhD at The New School in New York City.

== Career ==
Mason is a professor of economics, University of Massachusetts - Amherst, where he is also affiliated with the Political Economy Research Institute. Previously, he was employed at Florida State University, Tuskegee University, Clark Atlanta University, University of California, Riverside, Wayne State University, and the University of Notre Dame. His research focuses on racial disparities in law enforcement, intergenerational mobility and racial inequality, and the economics of identity. He is a past chairman of the Board of Directors, Partners for Dignity & Rights (formerly the National Economic and Social Rights Initiative), and he has been president of the National Economic Association. He is currently a board member of the Fair Foods Standards Council.

=== Selected publications ===
- Mason, Patrick L. "Economics of structural racism: stratification economics and US labor markets."

https://www.cambridge.org/core/books/economics-of-structural-racism/71F63F56B74F7A7D0E64E8CE146252B0

- Darity, William A., and Patrick L. Mason. "Evidence on discrimination in employment: Codes of color, codes of gender." Journal of Economic Perspectives 12, no. 2 (1998): 63–90.
- Darity Jr, William A., Patrick L. Mason, and James B. Stewart. "The economics of identity: the origin and persistence of racial identity norms." Journal of Economic Behavior & Organization 60, no. 3 (2006): 283–305.
- Mason, Patrick L. "Annual income, hourly wages, and identity among Mexican‐Americans and other Latinos." Industrial Relations: A Journal of Economy and Society 43, no. 4 (2004): 817–834.
- Close, Billy R., and Patrick L. Mason. "Searching for efficient enforcement: Officer characteristics and racially biased policing." Rev. L & Econ. 3 (2007): 263.
- Mason, Patrick L. "Race, culture, and skill: Interracial wage differences among African Americans, Latinos, and whites." The Review of Black Political Economy 25, no. 3 (1997): 5-39.
