= Paula Mitchell Marks =

American historian

- Occupation: Historian
- Known for: 1999 Pulitzer Prize finalist
- Notable work: In a Barren Land: American Indian Dispossession and Survival

Paula Mitchell Marks is an American historian specializing in U.S. women’s history and the history of the American West. She was a finalist for the 1999 Pulitzer Prize for history for her book, In a Barren Land: American Indian Dispossession and Survival.

== Education ==
Marks received her Ph.D. in American studies from the University of Texas at Austin in 1987.

== Career ==
Marks is professor emerita of American studies at St. Edward’s University in Austin, Texas. She held a number of previous positions at St. Edward's University, including associate dean and director of the Master of Liberal Arts program.

Her book In a Barren Land: American Indian Dispossession and Survival, which chronicles how the U.S. government and white settlers worked together to seize land from Native Americans, was a finalist for the 1999 Pulitzer Prize in History. Her earlier book, Precious dust: The American gold rush era, 1848-1900, received the 1994 Spur Award for Nonfiction-Historical from Western Writers of America.

Marks served on the boards of the Western Writers of America and the Texas Institute of Letters. In 2015, she became vice president of the Texas State Historical Association, more than thirty years after first joining the association as a graduate research assistant.

== Publications ==
- And die in the west: The story of the O.K. Corral gunfight. Norman: University of Oklahoma Press, 1989.
- Precious dust: The American gold rush era, 1848-1900. New York: W. Morrow, 1994.
- Hands to the spindle: Texas women and home textile production, 1822-1880. College Station, Tex: Texas A & M University Press, 1996.
- Precious dust: The saga of the western gold rushes. Lincoln: University of Nebraska Press, 1998.
- In a barren land: American Indian dispossession and survival. New York: William Morrow, 1999.
- When will the weary war be over?: The Civil War letters of the Maverick family of San Antonio. Dallas: The Book Club of Texas, 2009.

== Exhibition ==
- Women Shaping Texas in the 20th Century. Bullock Texas State History Museum. 2012-2013.
