= St. Edward's High School =

St. Edward's High School (Austin, Texas)
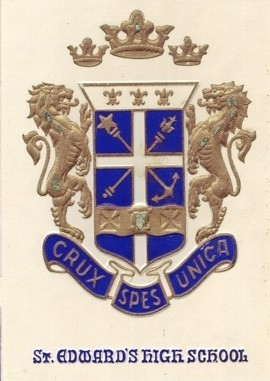
- Austin, Texas; USA

Information
- Type: Private, All Male
- Established: 1872
- Closed: 1967
- Principal: Br. Peter Celestine, C.S.C.
- Enrollment: 478
- Campus: Urban
- Colors: Blue and Gold
- Mascot: Tigers
- Affiliation: Roman Catholic, Congregation of Holy Cross
- Website: www.sehs-austin.org

St. Edward's High School was a private Roman Catholic institution of higher learning located in south Austin, Texas. The high school was known for offering high quality college preparatory education and for its campus situated on a hill overlooking the city. The campus's most prominent landmark is the recognizable neo-gothic Main Building.

== History (1872 - 1967) ==
In 1872, Father Edward Sorin, C.S.C., arrived in Austin to investigate the possibility of building a secondary educational institution. In 1872, Father Sorin bought one hundred and twenty-three acres from Mrs. Mary Doyle, a parishioner of St. Mary's Church. Later Mrs. Doyle donated an additional three hundred and ninety-four acres to Fr. Sorin for the purpose of establishing a high school-college.

St. Edward's High School opened in 1878, on the site of the present Internal Revenue Service building and was known as St. Edward's Academy.

In 1881 St. Edward's first boarding student moved onto the campus. Two day students enrolled. St. Edward's Academy became a six year high school offering a classical course and a commercial course. Meeting the requirements of the State of Texas, the Academy was officially chartered, in 1885, for a 50 year term.

Father Peter J. Hurth, C.S.C., determined to build a physical plant to satisfy the needs of the growing enrollment. In 1885 the Main Building was completed.

On April 9, 1903, the building burned to the ground. Within two days plans had been drawn up to rebuild the structure. The specifications called for a central portion of 107 feet by 50 feet.

During this time the school was known as St. Edward's College, although it was really a high school. Under Fr. Matthew Schumacher, St. Edward's defined clearly the collegiate and high school departments. Initially the high school did not have its own principal - the president held that title - nor did it have a separate faculty. At that time it was referred to as the “prep department.” Still it possessed a real identity which had been lacking before.

=== 1900s ===
In 1921 college-level courses were added to the curriculum. In 1924 and 1925, the institution became known as St. Edward's High School and received accreditation from the Southern Association of Colleges and Secondary Schools. Membership in this organization would elude the college for many years. Also in 1924 and 1925 St. Edward's received its University charter from the Texas State Department of Education and from the Texas Association of Colleges.

Between 1925 and 1958 St. Edward's High School and St. Edward's University were co-located. Both the high school and university administrations were located in the Gothic-styled Main Building. From 1958 until 1967 the two educational institutions remained co-located. The High School resided on the southeastern corner of the property. From 1958 until the school's closing in 1967, the High School and the Congregation's High School community took complete possession of the campus’ most recognizable feature - the imposing Main Building.

During the First World War, and the Great Depression, St. Edward's struggled to enlarge its facilities and enrollment, although it eventually succeeded.

In 1931, Brother Hubert Koeppen, C.S.C., arrived on campus. For the past 36 years Br. Hubert was a familiar figure. Many alumna return to the campus to see Brother Hubert.

=== Postwar ===
With the outbreak of the Second World War, the period of the 1940s saw many changes come to St. Edward's High School. Since young men enlisted in the military service, the college numbers dropped to an enrollment of 8 freshmen; and an increased high school enrollment filled the vacancy. This enabled the college not only to keep its Charter as a college but also to keep the college in existence. The college is now St. Edward's University. During this period of time the high school was used by the Texas State Guard as a training camp for high school and junior college men.

In 1958 Brother Peter Celestine C.S.C., came to St. Edward's as Principal and head of the boarding department. Many changes occurred during those years. The number of boarding students increased.

Coinciding with Brother Peter's arrival, the Congregation of Holy Cross decided to form two communities, one for the University and one for the High School, with Brother Peter serving as Superior of the Congregation's High School community. Unfortunately, by spinning off the High School community, the Congregation had unwittingly planted the seed for its ultimate demise.

The high school closed in 1967.

== Academic programs ==
- Jr. High School (grades 6 - 8)
- High School (grades 9 - 12) - curriculum to obtain a high school diploma
- College Prepl (grades 9 - 12) - curriculum for college entry & advanced Mathematics and Sciences

== Athletics ==
St. Edward's participated in the Texas Catholic Interscholastic League (TCIL) in football, basketball, baseball, track & field, cross country, golf, and tennis.

== Residences ==
St. Edward's was a boarding school with students from across the state of Texas, Mexico, Central and South America

== Notable alumni ==
- Ray Campi - Musician, The King of Rockabilly

== Gallery ==
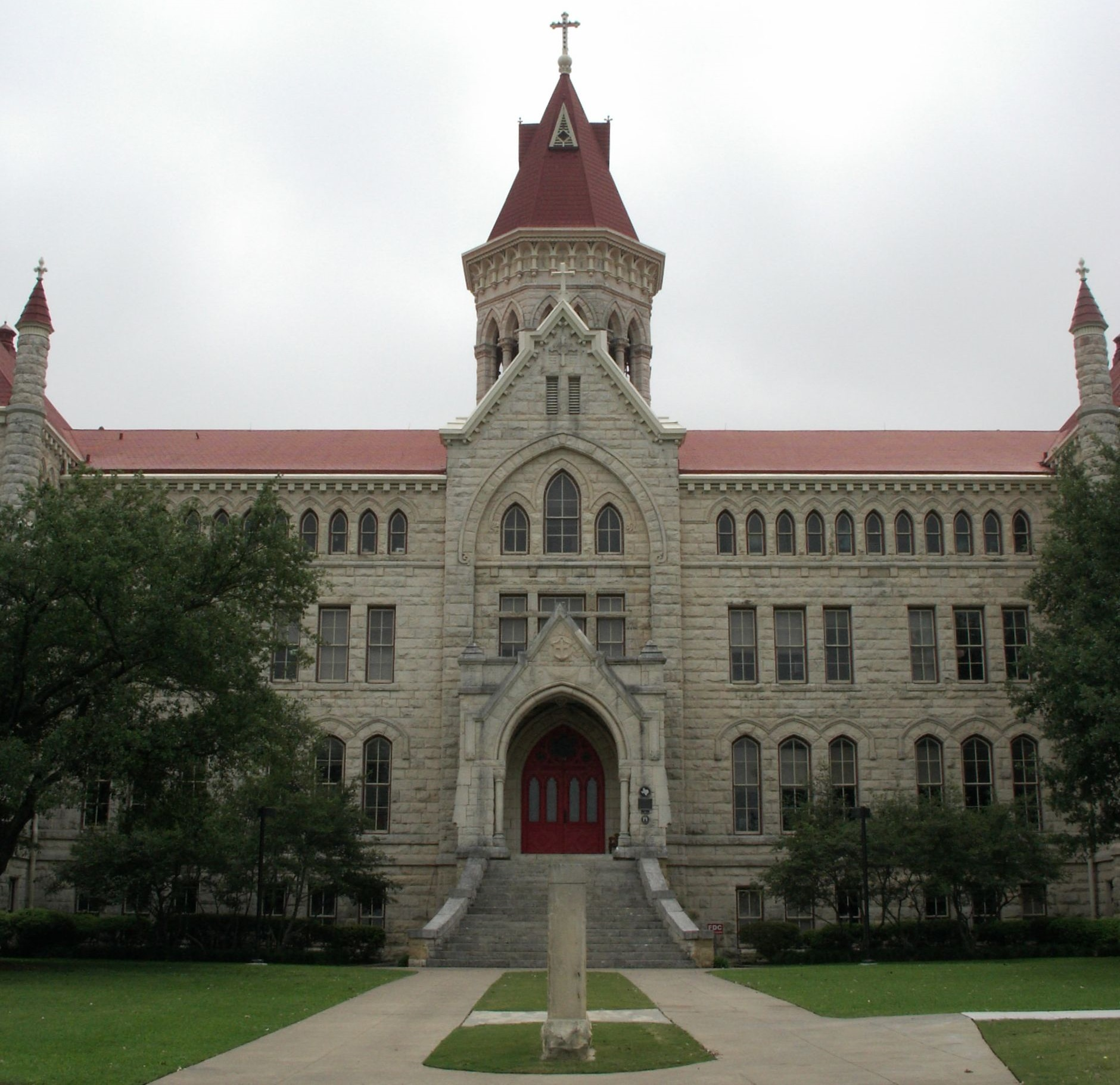
Main building

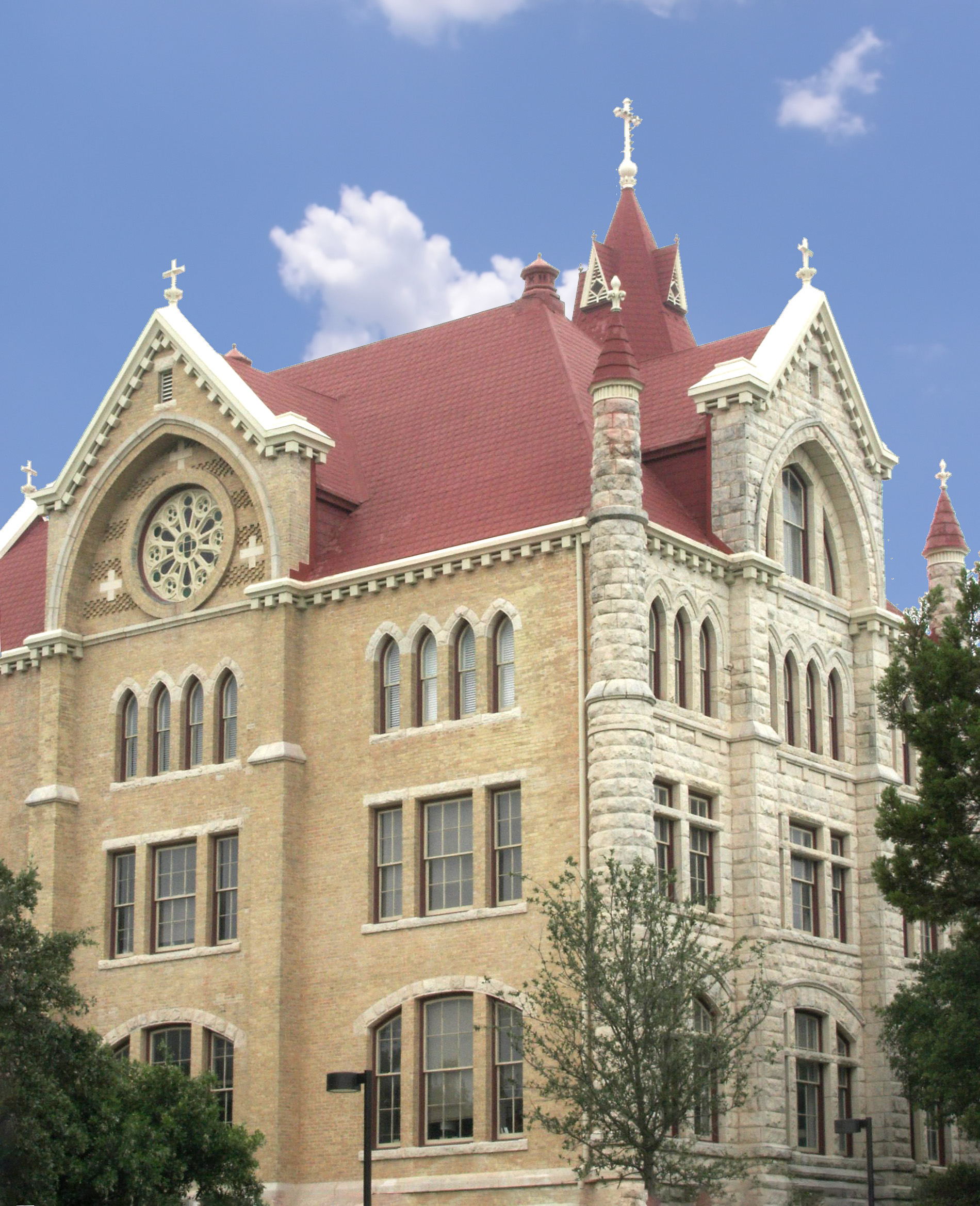
Southeast view of the main building

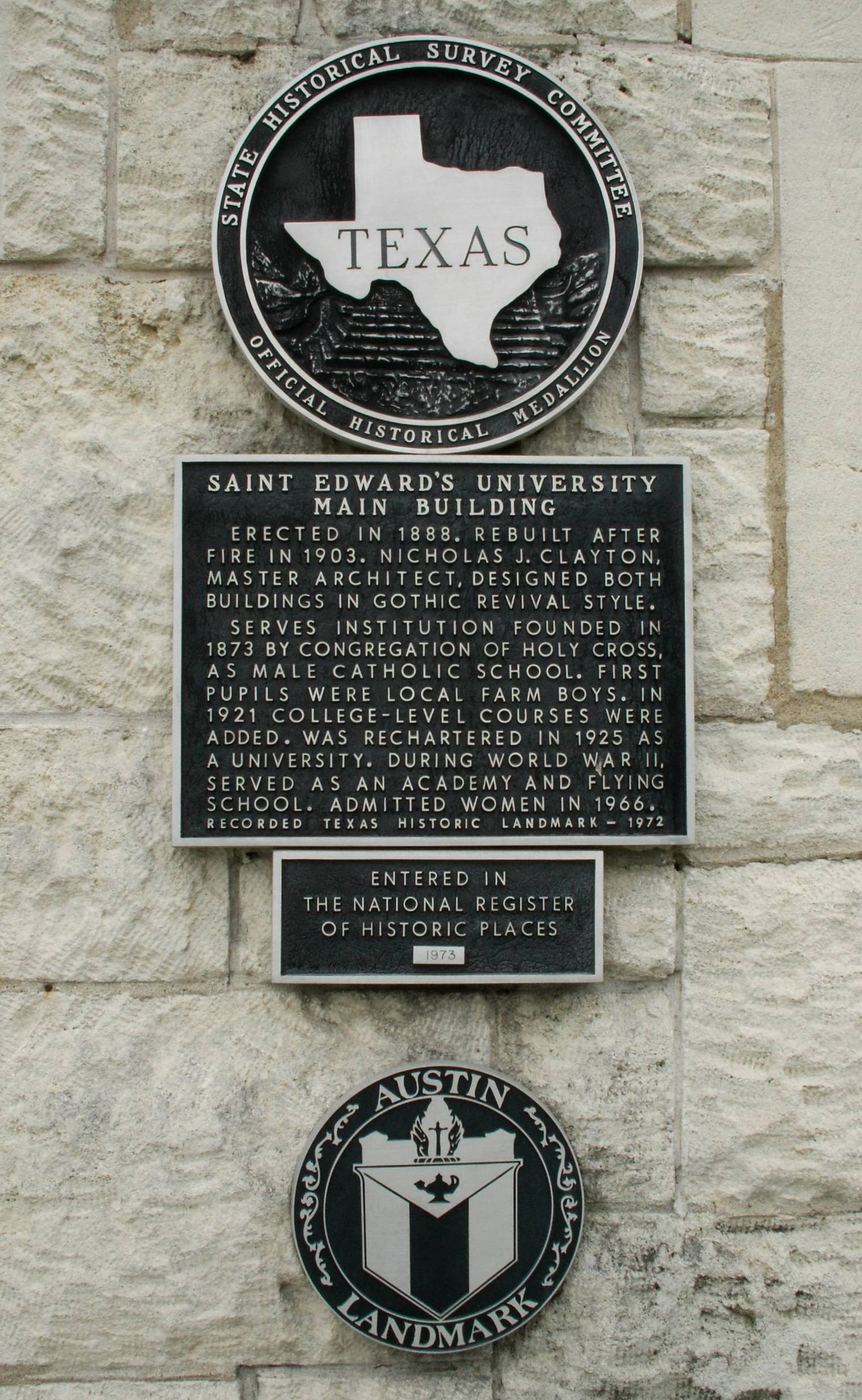
Historical marker on the main building

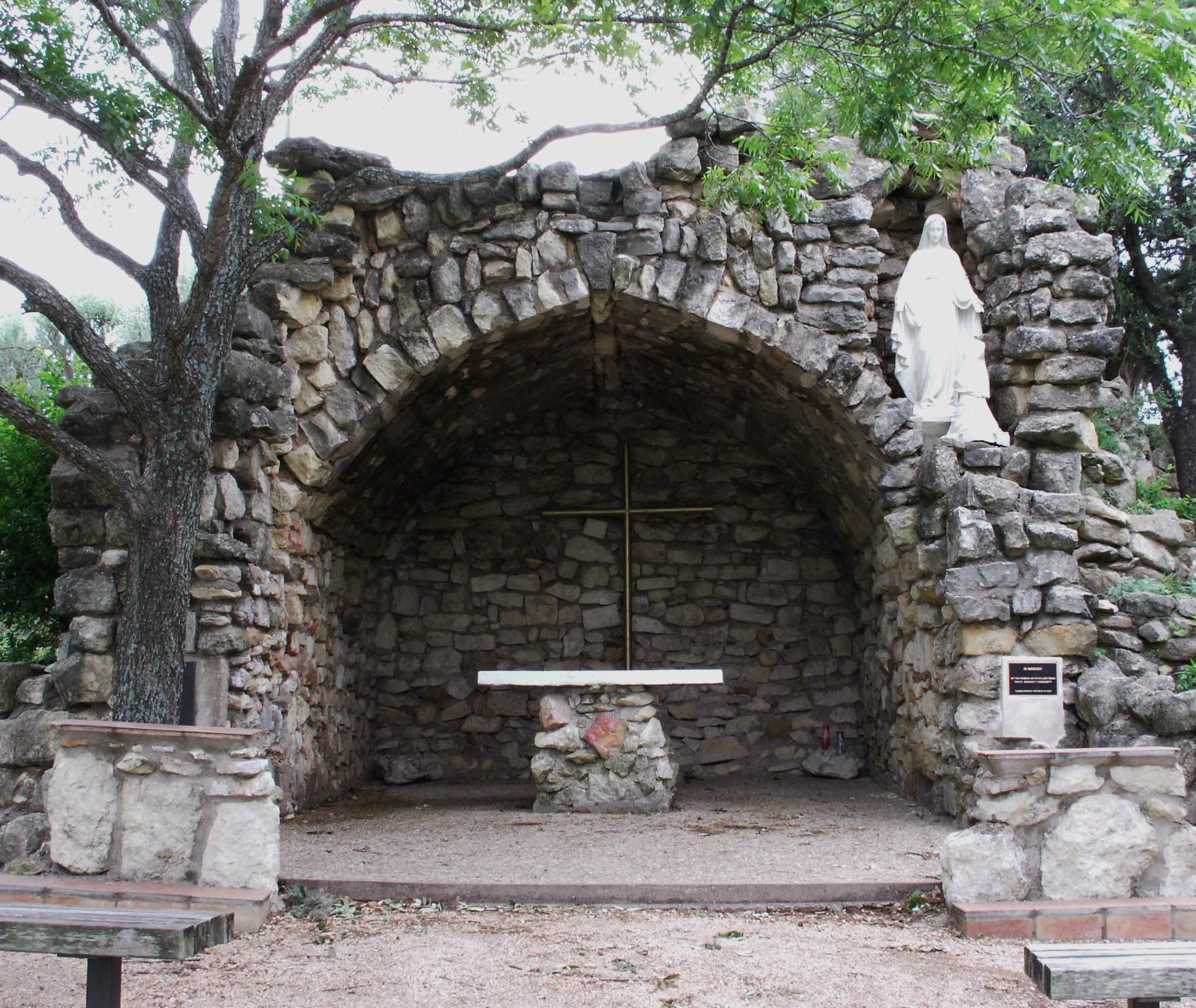
The grotto
