= Montserrat Fuentes =

Spanish statistician

24th President of St. Edward's University
- In office July 1, 2021 – July 1, 2026
- Preceded by: George E. Martin
- Succeeded by: Matthew Shank (interim)

Personal details
- Education: University of Valladolid (BS, BS); University of Chicago (PhD)

Academic background
- Thesis: Prediction of Random Fields and Modeling Spatialtemporal Satellite Data. (1998)

Academic work
- Discipline: Statistics; Spatial Analysis
- Institutions: North Carolina State University; Virginia Commonwealth University; University of Iowa; St. Edward's University

Montserrat (Montse) Fuentes is a Spanish statistician and academic administrator. She served as the twenty-fourth president of St. Edward's University in Austin, Texas, from 2021 to 2026. She is also the Coordinating Editor and Applications and Case Studies Editor for the Journal of the American Statistical Association. In her research, she applies spatial analysis to atmospheric science.

== Education and career ==
Fuentes earned two bachelor's degrees in 1993 from the University of Valladolid, one in music and piano, and a second in mathematics and statistics. She completed her Ph.D. in statistics in 1998 from the University of Chicago. Her dissertation, supervised by Michael L. Stein, was Prediction of Random Fields and Modeling Spatialtemporal Satellite Data.

After visiting positions at the Joint Research Center of the European Union in Italy, AT&T Labs, and the National Center for Atmospheric Research, she joined the North Carolina State University (NCSU) faculty in 1998. At NCSU she became the James M. Goodnight Distinguished Professor of Statistics and Chair of the Department of Statistics before moving to Virginia Commonwealth University as Dean of the College of Humanities and Sciences in 2016. In 2019, she was named Executive Vice President and Provost at the University of Iowa, and in late 2020 she was named president of St. Edward's University. She resigned from the latter position on July 1, 2026.

== Awards and honors ==
Fuentes became a Fellow of the American Statistical Association in 2008. She is an elected member of the International Statistical Institute. She became the James M. Goodnight Distinguished Professor at NCSU in 2015. In 2017, she was one of three winners of the Medal of Distinguished Achievement of the Environmental Statistics Section of the American Statistical Association.
