= Main Building (St. Edward's University) =

Historic structure in Austin, Texas, U.S.

- St. Edward's University Main Building and Holy Cross Dormitory
- U.S. National Register of Historic Places
- Recorded Texas Historic Landmark
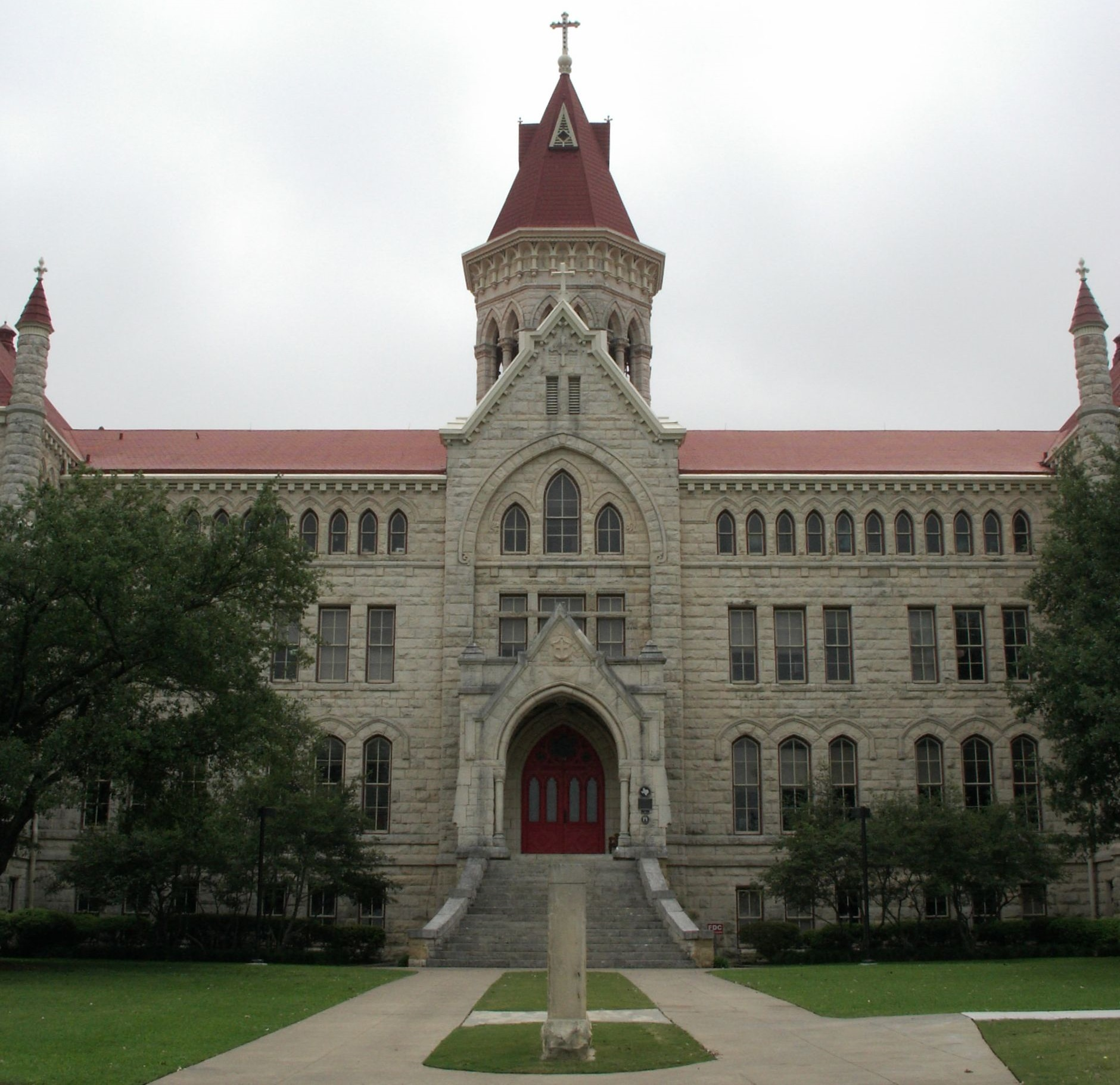
- Main entrance, viewed from the north

- Location within Texas Location within the United States
- Location: 3001 S. Congress St., Austin, Texas, U.S.
- Coordinates: 30°13′46″N 97°45′17″W
- Area: 5 acres (2.0 ha)
- Built: 1903
- Architect: Nicholas J. Clayton
- Architectural style: Gothic Revival
- NRHP reference No.: 73001980
- RTHL No.: 14821

Significant dates
- Added to NRHP: March 7, 1973
- Designated RTHL: 1972

Main Building is the central administration building of St. Edward's University in Austin, Texas, United States, and formerly also of St. Edward's High School (now defunct). First completed in 1888 and rebuilt after a fire in 1903, Main Building has been listed on the National Register of Historic Places since 1973, along with adjacent Holy Cross Hall.

== History ==
St. Edward's University was founded in 1877 by Edward Sorin, a Roman Catholic priest who also founded the University of Notre Dame. The school was established on farmland atop a promontory to the south of Austin. As the institution grew in the early 1880s, college president Peter Joseph Hurth decided to commission an administration building on that hilltop, hiring architect Nicholas J. Clayton of Galveston, Texas, to design the structure.

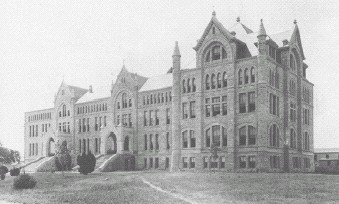
The first Main Building in 1889

Clayton produced a large Gothic Revival design, four stories high with tall Gothic windows; this first Main Building was begun in 1887 and completed in 1888. On April 9, 1903, the first building was destroyed in a fire; the university then commissioned Clayton, the original architect, to design a replacement for the structure, on essentially the same plan, upgraded to include modern fireproofing features. Main Building was rebuilt over the spring and summer, ready for use by the beginning of the fall 1903 semester. At the same time, another new building, Holy Cross Hall, was built alongside the new Main Building, sharing its overall design on a smaller scale.

Since its first opening, Main Building has housed the administrative offices of St. Edward's College (as the school was known in its first decades) and St. Edward's University (since the university was charted in 1925); it also formerly held the administration of St. Edward's High School from 1921, when the secondary school was separated from the college, until 1967, when the high school was closed. During World War II the facility housed a military academy and flight school. Holy Cross Hall has been used as a dormitory and has held classrooms, offices and meeting space.

=== Repairs and renovations ===
In 1922 a tornado struck the campus, tearing a hole through the south face of Main Building that required extensive repairs. The building underwent substantial renovations in 1986 to bring it into compliance with modern building codes and reinforce the exterior walls. Repairs to the exterior stonework, roofing and windows were undertaken in 2014, along with the restoration of the bell tower's original bell. Another round of exterior restorations and interior renovations began in 2016, while similar work was underway at Holy Cross Hall.

== Architecture ==
Main Building is a roughly rectangular four-story hall, clad with local white limestone on its northern facade, with a central bell tower projecting several stories higher from the rear. The building is divided into three sections: two taller and bulkier wings on the east and west, and a more narrow central segment joining them, totaling a 12,300-square-foot (1,140 m^{2}) footprint. Main Building exemplifies the Collegiate Gothic architecture that was popular among educational institutions in late-nineteenth-century America, with its protruding one-story church porch, tall lancet windows with hood molding, and turreted buttresses.

=== Main facade ===
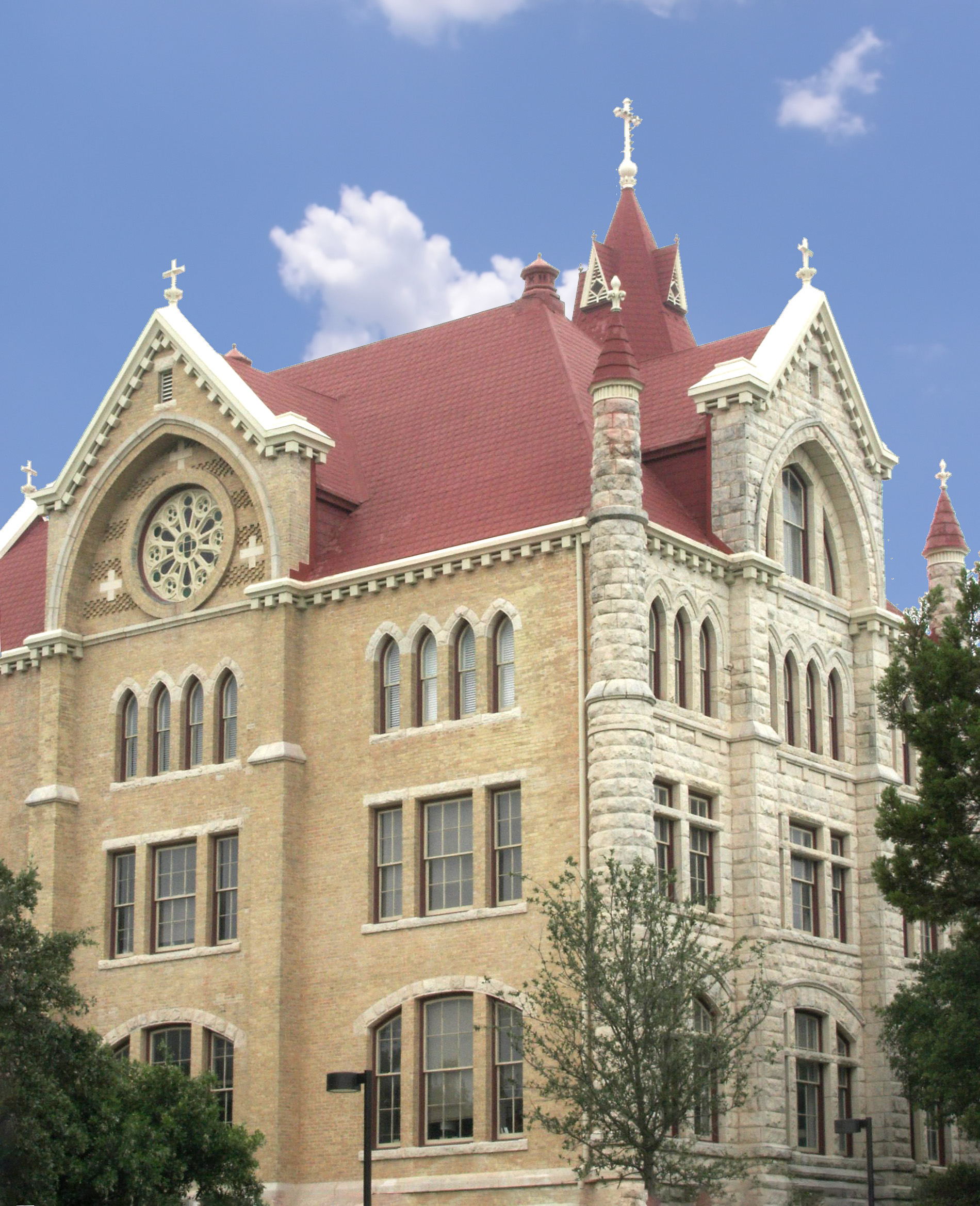
Main Building east wing, viewed from the northeast

The main entry is in the center of the north facade, where a flared staircase leads up to the porch and red double doors framed by a Gothic arch with hood mold and pointed gable. Above the entrance the facade is marked by a central bay, which projects slightly forward and frames three columns of windows with another hood mold and gable, matching those on the facing of the porch. Each level of the central segment has its own style of windows: the first floor has trios of pointed-arch windows with hood molding, while the second has trios of simple rectangles, and the third has a series of small lancet windows with hood molds. A line of dentils follows the roofline, including under the high gable of the central bay.

The east and west wings of the building project forward relative to the central portion, and their steeply pitched rooflines extend upward another story above the center. The north face of each wing is divided into three vertical bays by four buttresses, two on the face of the structure and two at the corners; the corner buttresses extend above the roofline to form cylindrical turrets topped with conical spires. Each bay on the wings duplicates the pattern of windows from the central facade, but the wings' central bays and gables extend higher than the corresponding bay above the main entrance.

=== Other features ===
The central tower rises from the rear of the building, its lower levels protruding from the south face. The first four stories of the tower are round and embedded in the building, supported by two heavy limestone buttresses. Near the roofline, a ring of blind arches forms a transition to a freestanding octagonal upper section; only this upper portion is visible from the front of the building. The walls of the upper section are pierced by an octagonal open arcade of Gothic arches, topped with an encircling corbelled cornice. Above the cornice, the roof forms a steep octagonal pyramid, pierced by four small gabled windows, and topped by a cross-shaped finial.

The sides and rear of the building are faced with brick rather than limestone, excepting the lower portion of the tower and its buttresses. The windows and gables on the other faces are similar but simplified versions of those found on the main facade.

=== Holy Cross Hall ===
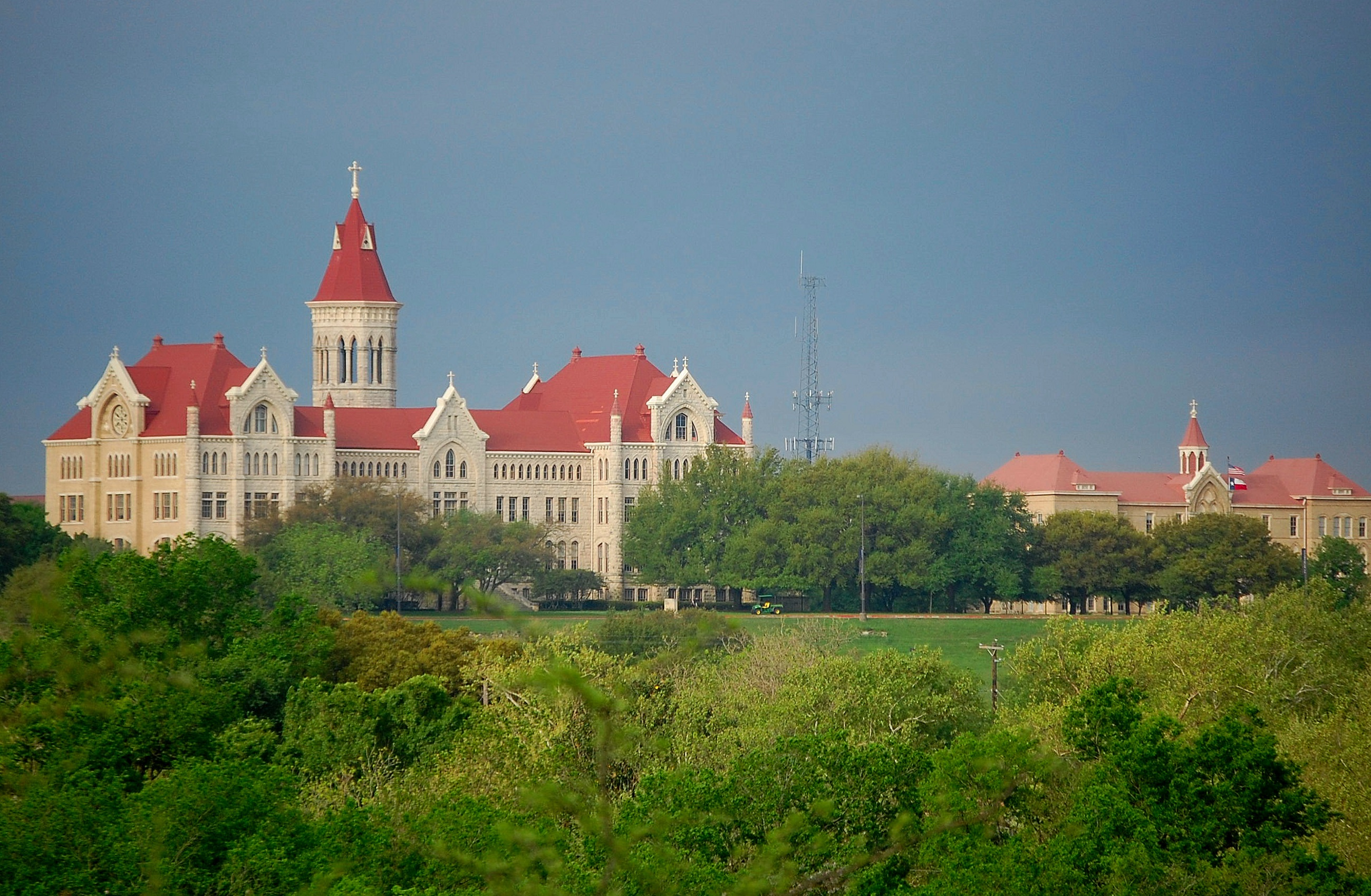
Main Building (left) and Holy Cross Hall, viewed from the northeast

Built adjacent to Main Building while that structure was reconstructed after the 1903 fire, Holy Cross Hall shares a simplified version of its larger neighbor's architectural design. The smaller hall shares the same overall center-and-wings floorplan, but on a considerably smaller footprint and only three stories high. The entire exterior is faced with the same bricks used on the sides and rear of Main Building, and it lacks the larger structure's high gabled bays, except above the main entrance on the north side. In place of Main Building's bell tower, Holy Cross Hall has a modest one-story turret.

== See also ==
- National Register of Historic Places listings in Travis County, Texas
