= General Motors ignition switch recalls =

Vehicle recall by General Motors (2014–15)

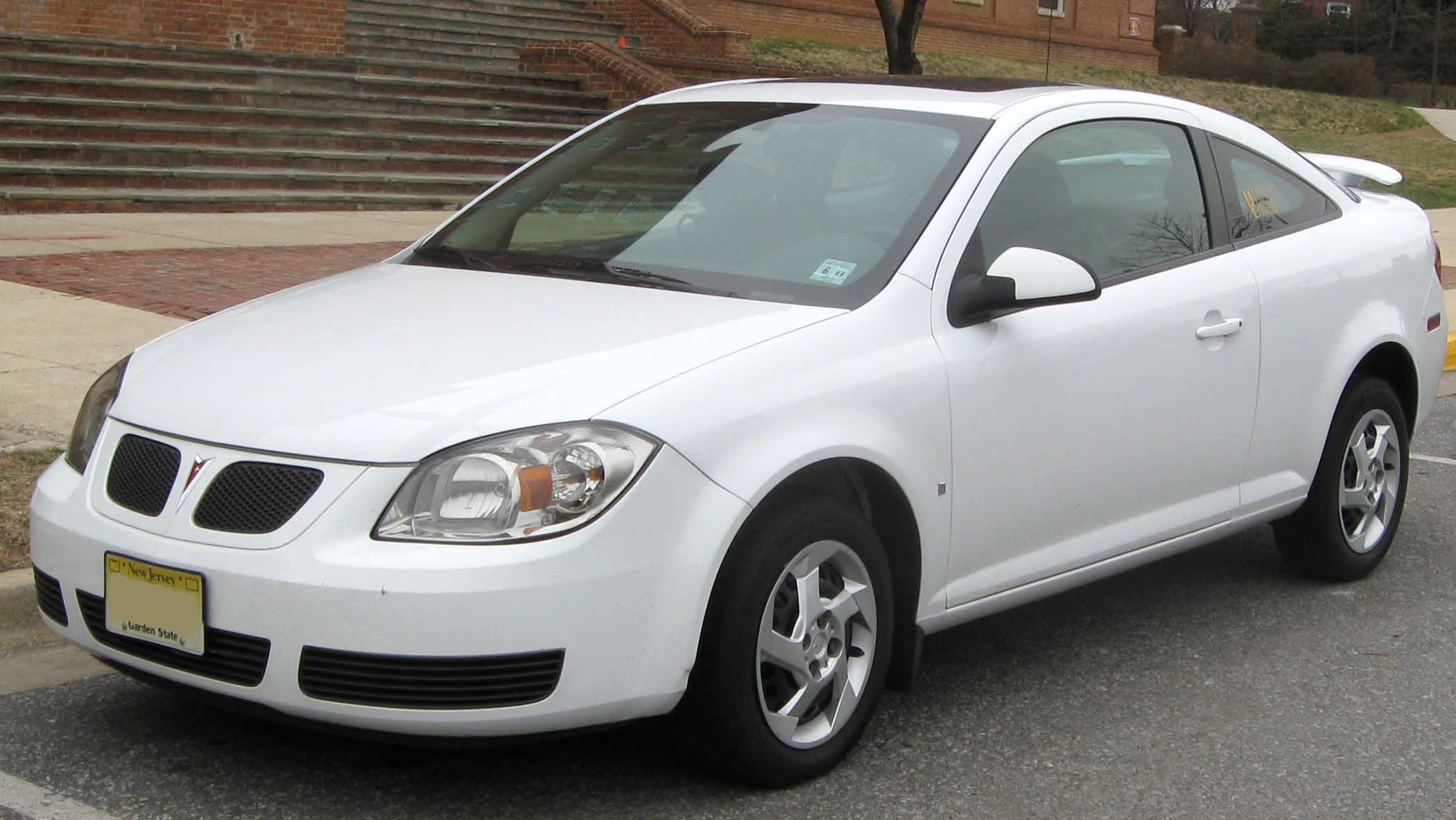
- Pontiac G5, one of the models recalled by GM
- Date: Feb 2014 – Sep 2015
- Location: United States
- Cause: Faulty ignition switch
- Outcome: 30 million cars worldwide recalled; paid compensation for 124 deaths; forfeited $900 million to the United States
- Deaths: 124
- Accused: General Motors

On February 6, 2014, General Motors (GM) recalled about 800,000 of its small cars due to faulty ignition switches, which could shut off the engine while the vehicle was in motion, thereby preventing the airbags from inflating. The company continued to recall more of its cars over the next several months, resulting in nearly 30 million cars recalled worldwide and compensation paid for 124 deaths. The fault had been known to GM for at least a decade prior to the recall. GM faced significant criticism and several lawsuits from the public for failing to issue a recall sooner in spite of their knowledge of the design flaw. As part of a deferred prosecution agreement, GM forfeited $900 million to the United States.

== Initial and subsequent recalls ==
The first recall was announced on February 7, 2014, and involved about 800,000 Chevrolet Cobalts and Pontiac G5s. On March 31, GM announced it was going to recall over 1.5 million more cars of six different models, due to faulty power steering. Of these, over 1.3 million were in the United States, and three of the models were also involved in the faulty ignition recall. The total number of cars recalled during 2014 as of 1 April was 6.26 million. On May 15, GM recalled 2.7 million more cars, bringing the total number of recalled vehicles in 2014 to 12.8 million worldwide, 11.1 million of which were in the United States.

Most of these recalls were from Chevrolet, with a total of 1.4 million cars, and Cadillac, with a total of over 2 million cars, and the rest of the recalls branched from the smaller brands.

On June 16, 2014, GM announced they were recalling 3.4 million more cars, all of which were produced from 2000 to 2004. They also announced that they intended to replace the cars' keys, because if they did not, the ignition switches could rotate, causing the car's engines to shut off, disabling power steering.

On June 30, 2014, GM announced they were going to recall 8.45 million additional cars, almost all of which were being recalled for defective ignition switches. This announcement brought the total number of recalled cars in North America to about 29 million. In November 2014 emails surfaced that showed GM ordered a half-million replacement ignition switches nearly two months before ordering a recall.

== Cause of ignition failure ==
There are no specified torque or vibration standards imposed on a vehicle's ignition switch by the NHTSA. However, General Motors did create their own criteria and specifications as a guide for their engineers. It was found that the ignition switches subject to the recall did not meet two of GM's specific requirements — torque required and vibration environment — for the ignition switch. The torque, or rotational power that prevents the ignition switch from changing modes, was required by GM's own standards to be between 10 N·cm and 20 N·cm (Newton centimeters). However, it was less than 10 N·cm, a force so little that made it prone to changes in modes which could potentially shut off the engine. The switch was required to withstand exposure to a vibration environment without damage or loss of function. Yet, it was discovered that during extreme moments of vibrations, or even with the presence of heavy objects on a keychain, the switch would change modes from Run to Accessory without the intent of the driver. The ignition switch was designed to remove power from the vehicle's airbags when in the Off or Accessory mode. Therefore, this was a safety hazard: If the switch changed from Run to Accessory and the vehicle was involved in an accident, it would no longer have power to release the airbags, and it would be difficult for the driver to steer and brake. General Motors was aware of this potential problem, and held meetings about it, as early as 2005.

== Compensation ==
GM compensated claimants for 124 deaths potentially linked to faulty ignition switches. Originally, they linked the failures to 13 deaths and 31 crashes. The company only counted incidents resulting in head-on collisions in which the airbags did not deploy. It did not include, for example, an incident where after a car's ignition switch failed, the car "spun out, hydroplaned, hit an oncoming vehicle and rolled off the road, dropping 15 feet into a creek". In a collision in which two young women in a Chevrolet Cobalt were killed when the ignition switch shut off the engine, GM only counted the death of the woman in the front seat, because the death of the woman in the back seat was not caused by the failure of the airbag to deploy. Most of the victims were under age 25. On June 3, 2014, Reuters published an analysis concluding that the faulty switches were responsible for 74 deaths, based on Fatality Analysis Reporting System data. General Motors disputed its conclusion, and stood by their original figure of 13 deaths after the report was released as of June 3, 2014. By the end of September, Reuters stated in an article that 153 deaths were linked to the faulty ignition switch. As of March 2015, GM had offered compensation for 11 Category One injuries, along with 115 Category Two injuries. In April 2015, GM officially noted that the death toll was believed to have reached 87, higher than the previous number of 74 they reported in March 2015. Upon its completion, the compensation fund established by GM had offered compensation for 124 deaths, nearly 10 times more than the 13 deaths GM executives reported in April 2014. However, the true number of deaths resulting from the ignition switch is likely higher, as GM's compensation fund rejected more than 90% of claims and it did not include claims that are part of the ongoing Multidistrict Litigation.

== Public disclosure of the problem ==
The defect was not disclosed by GM nor was it discovered by government regulators or transportation safety agencies. Instead, public knowledge came about because Lance Cooper, a Marietta, Georgia attorney who sued GM on behalf of the family of a woman who had died in a crash, obtained thousands of pages of documents from GM and took the depositions of several GM engineers. According to Sean Kane, the president of a vehicle safety research firm, Cooper "single-handedly set the stage for this recall."

=== Reaction to the recall ===
The families of the 13 people who died in car crashes involving the recalled vehicles gathered outside the US Capitol prior to Mary Barra's testimony on April 1. They were joined by four Democratic politicians in support of tougher rules regarding the disclosure of automobile defects. At the Capitol, they also said that their relatives had died "because they were a cost of doing business GM style." The recall cost GM more than $3 billion in shareholders' value over four weeks.

One mother, Laura Christian, created a Facebook page to bring together the family, friends and those who support them.

== Testimony and lawsuits ==
=== Congressional testimony ===
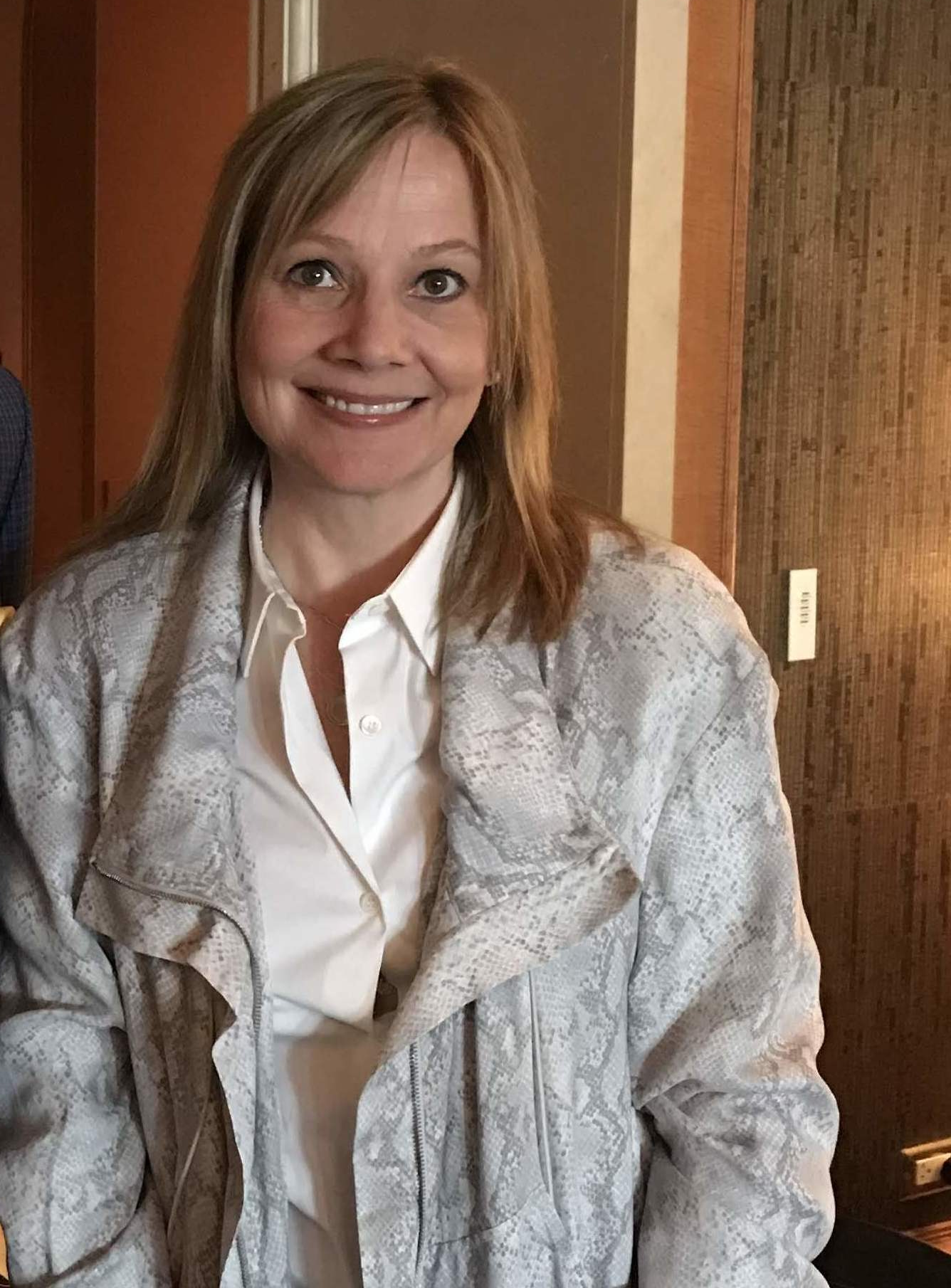
Mary Barra, CEO of GM, gave her testimony during the trial

Mary Barra's testimony also stated that she does not know why it took nearly a decade to try to initiate a recall, but that she has accelerated efforts to fix the switches, and that she offers "my sincere apologies to everyone who has been affected by this recall, especially to the families and friends of those who lost their lives or were injured. I am deeply sorry." These remarks were sharply criticized by some of the victims' family members, one of whom dismissed Barra's meeting with them as a mere PR stunt, and by Heidi Moore, who wrote that "[Barra] saying sorry to Congress won't cut it" and that GM "has been good at telling stories that the public wants to hear." Also attending the hearing will be David J. Friedman, the Acting Administrator of the National Highway Traffic Safety Administration (NHTSA), who will be asked why he did not act sooner to recall the cars with the faulty switches, since the NHTSA was aware of the problem before the recall. Friedman's written testimony blames GM for not conveying "critical information" to regulators which could have led to recalls years earlier As compensation to the victims' families, GM recalled 6 million Cadillac, 11 million Chevrolet and 9 million GMC vehicles in 2015. .

Barra made a number of statements during her testimony which received much media attention. She testified that General Motors would employ Kenneth Feinberg as a consultant to help them decide how to compensate families of those injured by the recalled cars. This decision was praised by Paul M. Barrett, who wrote in Businessweek that "...bringing in Feinberg is an excellent first step" because he has more than 20 years of experience in mass-injury cases. Barra also said that she asked attorney Anton R. Valukas to help find out why GM took so long to initiate a recall of the defective cars, and that a full account of why this did not happen sooner would have to wait until the results of Valukas's investigation were announced.

Another of her widely reported remarks was that she found GM's concern about the cost of replacing the faulty switches "disturbing" (this was in response to Congresswoman Diana DeGette telling the subcommittee that it would have only cost 57 cents to fix each faulty ignition switch). After being asked by Missouri Senator Claire McCaskill whether a GM engineer had apparently lied under oath, Barra confirmed that this had indeed happened (or at least seemed to). McCaskill later appeared on This Week, where she said of GM that "They've tried to lawyer up and play whack-a-mole with these lawsuits, and terrible things have happened," and that "Now it's time for them to come clean, be transparent and most of all make victims whole no matter when this deadly ignition caused heartbreak in their families."

During the hearings, Barbara Boxer asked Barra why, during the 33 years she worked at GM prior to becoming the CEO in 2013, she never heard anything about the faulty ignition switches. After Barra failed to give a substantive answer, Boxer exclaimed to her that "You don't know anything about anything," and that "If this is the new GM leadership, it's pretty lacking."

Also in April 2014, federal safety regulators testified before Congress that they had expected the airbags in the defective cars to be able to deploy for 60 seconds after the engine stalled, but General Motors later told the Associated Press that they actually can only do so for 150 milliseconds.

==== Reactions to Barra's testimony ====
In the Wall Street Journal, Holman Jenkins praised the fact that Barra did not argue that the failure to recall the defective vehicles was due to "...the problems of a company that no longer exists and a product that's no longer made." However, for the same reason, he also criticized her for suggesting that the company would be more customer-focused with her as the CEO than it was when GM first found out about the faulty switches.

=== Lawsuits ===
A large number of lawsuits have been filed in response to the recall, by those claiming to have been injured due to the recalled vehicles' faulty switches. These lawsuits include at least two class action ones, one filed by a man from Myerstown, Pennsylvania on April 2 and another filed in federal court in California. Two other lawsuits have also named Delphi Automotive, the car parts manufacturer that produced the defective switches, as one of the parties partly responsible for the deaths caused by the now-recalled vehicles. On July 29, 2014, a lawsuit was filed in US District Court in Manhattan on behalf of 658 people who claim that they were injured or killed because of the faulty ignition switches in GM's recalled cars. The lawsuit alleges that GM knew about the faulty switches since 2001 but did not recall any of its cars until 2014. The Orange County District Attorney has also filed a lawsuit against GM on behalf of the People of the State of California alleging the company engaged in unfair competition and false advertising in violation of California law when it failed to disclose defects.

In April 2016, General Motors reached a confidential settlement with the Pittsburgh-based law firm Pribanic & Pribanic in a wrongful death lawsuit filed on behalf of the family of James E. Yingling III – a Pennsylvania man killed in a November 2013 one-vehicle crash. The case was selected as the third in a series of bellwether trials related to the company's extensive recall of defective ignition switches. General Motors won the first two bellwether cases, but days before the Yingling case was expected to go to trial, General Motors offered a settlement that both Mr. Yingling's widow, Nadia, and lead attorney Victor Pribanic found acceptable.

=== Prosecution deferred and compensation to victims ===
On September 17, 2015, General Motors entered into a Deferred Prosecution Agreement with the United States Department of Justice, in which GM admitted that "from in or about the spring of 2012 through in or about February 2014, GM failed to disclose a deadly safety defect to its U.S. regulator ... It also falsely represented to consumers that vehicles containing the defect posed no safety concern." As part of the Deferred Prosecution Agreement, GM agreed to forfeit $900 million to the United States. GM gave $600 million in compensation to surviving victims of accidents caused by faulty ignition switches.

== Implications ==
GM found that a lack of communication of the problem to upper management contributed to the problem. The faulty ignition switch caused the vehicle's mode to change abruptly, shutting off the engine, and preventing the airbags from being released. GM compensated claimants for injuries and deaths when their vehicles were involved in accidents during the last decade. General Motors lawyers were evidently aware of the defect since 2005 and failed to communicate this issue to the upper management. This included CEO, Mary Barra, and the board of directors who claim to have learned about the defect in January 2014. By not disclosing such pertinent information, they violated clearly defined ethical obligations under state rules and federal law such as the Sarbanes–Oxley Act. Just like the lawyers, GM engineers were evidently aware of the issue. They had received reports about these faulty ignition switches and discussed possible solutions as early as 2005. However, they decided not to fix this issue because it was costly and time-consuming. General Motors recall after nearly a decade had a significant impact on the company's reputation. In addition, they expected sales to decline since customers would associate the company with the scandal. The CEO, declared that GM's reputation "won't be determined by the recall itself, but how we address the problem". The company was determined to honor Barra's promise and, as a result, hired outside attorney Anton Valukas to conduct an internal investigation. GM's investigation found "a pattern of incompetence and neglect at the company, but no cover-up". Barra stated she planned to act on all of Valukas recommendations, including firing 15 employees that were determined to have acted inappropriately and disciplining five others. In addition, General Motors launched a compensation program for victims who were harmed by the faulty ignition switches that prompted a recall of more than two and a half million vehicles.

== GM's statements on the safety of recalled cars ==
General Motors has stated that the recalled cars are safe to drive unless the driver has additional items attached to the key ring. However, some consumer advocacy groups have urged GM to declare the cars unsafe for driving no matter what, saying they still pose a danger. In fact, a lawsuit was filed in Texas on April 4, with the plaintiffs aiming to force GM to declare its recalled cars unsafe to drive, but the judge, Nelva Gonzales Ramos, refrained from doing so that day, saying she needed more information.

== Aftermath ==
=== Repairs ===
GM said the parts needed to repair the faulty ignition switches were expected to become available on April 7, 2014. However, that same day, CNN Money contacted six dealerships, none of whom had received these parts. A spokesman for GM, Alan Adler, said that he didn't know how many replacement parts had been shipped to dealerships, or when the majority of parts would be available. Some cars received new tumblers, while others had their original keys (if remaining available) had a plug glued in place to make the hole where the keyring goes smaller.

=== Fines ===
On April 8, the NHTSA fined GM $28,000, because the company hadn't supplied the agency with the information it had requested it give them by April 3, and the agency charged them $7,000 for each day after then that GM didn't provide this information. On May 16, GM agreed to pay the Department of Transportation the maximum fine of $35 million for delaying the recall of the defective cars they recalled earlier in 2014.

=== Executive departures ===
On April 14, 2014, GM announced that two of its executives, Selim Bingol, senior vice president for global communications and public policy, and Melissa Howell, senior vice president for global human resources, were departing the company. GM did not say whether Bingol and Howell had resigned or were fired.

=== Valukas report ===
On June 5, 2014, Valukas' report on the recall was made public. In it, he asserted that the company's failure to fix the defective switches sooner was not due to a cover-up on the company's part, but rather due to "their failure to understand, quite simply, how the car was built." The report led to Barra firing 15 of her employees.

=== Feinberg plan ===
On June 30, 2014, Kenneth Feinberg unveiled a plan to compensate victims of recalled GM cars, including an agreement to pay "whatever it costs" to do so. At a press conference held by the National Press Club, Feinberg added that the compensation fund will accept applications from August 1, 2014 until the end of the year, and that he has the last word as to how much the victims' families should be compensated. In the first week after the fund began accepting applications, 125 claims were filed, 63 involving fatalities. As of September 15, 2014, according to Feinberg's deputy administrator, Camille Biros, 19 deaths are eligible for compensation under Feinberg's plan.
