= Mel Stuessy =

American football player (1901–1980)

Profile
- Position: Tackle / Guard

Personal information
- Born: August 8, 1901; Belleville, Illinois, U.S.
- Died: October 2, 1980 (aged 79); Woodstock, Illinois, U.S.
- Listed height: 5 ft 9 in (1.75 m)
- Listed weight: 180 lb (82 kg)

Career information
- College: St. Edward's

Career history
- Chicago Cardinals (1926)
- Stats at Pro Football Reference

Melvin Matthias Stuessy (August 8, 1901 – October 2, 1980) was an American professional football tackle who played one season with the Chicago Cardinals of the National Football League (NFL). He played college football at St. Edward's College.

== Early life ==
Melvin Matthias Stuessy was born on August 8, 1901, in Belleville, Illinois. He played college football for the St. Edward's Saints of St. Edward's College.

== Professional career ==
Stuessy played in one game for the Chicago Cardinals of the National Football League during the 1926 season. He stood 5'9" and weighed 180 pounds.

== Personal life ==
Stuessy served as mayor of Woodstock, Illinois from 1967 to 1973. He was named the 1974 Woodstock Citizen of the Year. He was also a high school sports coach. Stuessy died on October 2, 1980, in Woodstock.
