= St. Edward's University =

Catholic university in Austin, Texas, US

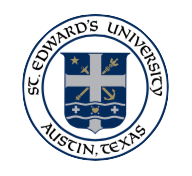
- Former names: St. Edward's Academy (1877–1885); St. Edward's College (1885–1925)
- Motto: Live Fully
- Type: Private university
- Established: 1877; 149 years ago
- Religious affiliation: Roman Catholic (Congregation of Holy Cross)
- Academic affiliations: ACCU; NAICU; CIC
- Endowment: $142.3 million (2024)
- President: Montserrat Fuentes
- Students: 3,309
- Location: Austin, Texas, U.S. 30°14′N 97°45′W
- Campus: Urban, 155 acres (63 ha)
- Colors: Blue and Gold
- Nickname: Hilltoppers
- Sporting affiliations: NCAA Division II – Lone Star Conference
- Mascot: Mountain goat
- Website: stedwards.edu

St. Edward's University is a private, Catholic university in Austin, Texas, United States. It was founded and is operated in the Holy Cross tradition.

== History ==
=== Founding and early history ===
St. Edward's University was founded by Edward Sorin, Superior General of the Congregation of Holy Cross, who also founded the University of Notre Dame in Notre Dame, Indiana. Sorin established the institution on farmland south of Austin in 1877 and named it St. Edward's Academy in honor of his patron saint, King Edward the Confessor. The high school section later separated to become St. Edward's High School but closed during the 1970s. It is affiliated with the Congregation of Holy Cross.

In 1885, president P.J. Franciscus secured a charter and changed the name to St. Edward's College. Under the presidency of Peter Joseph Hurth (1886–1894), enrollment increased. The first school newspaper (1888), the organization of baseball and football teams, and approval to start building an administration building (1889) all followed. Architect Nicholas J. Clayton of Galveston, Texas was commissioned to design the college's Main Building. The structure was built four stories tall in the Gothic Revival style and was constructed with local white limestone.

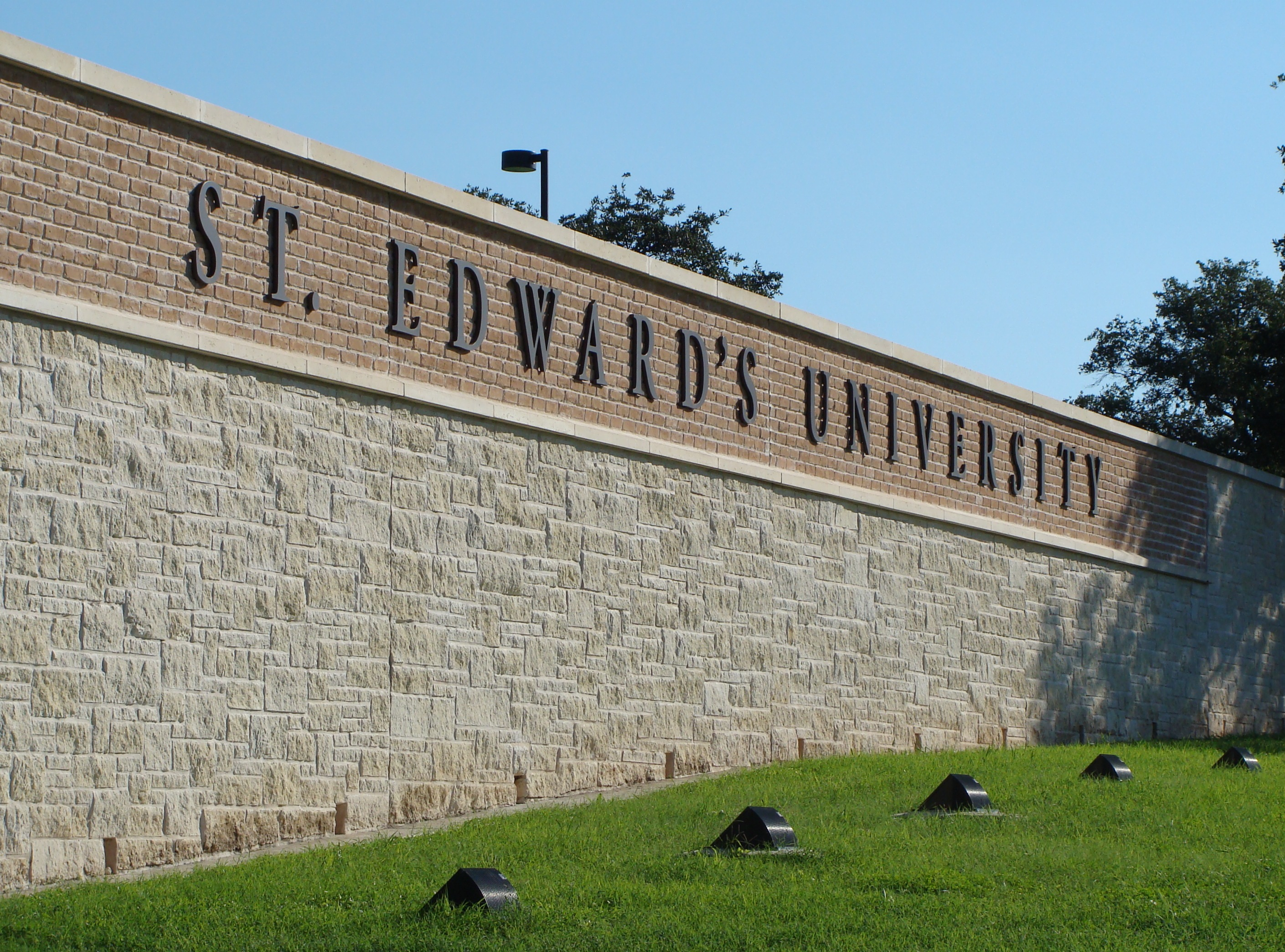
Main entrance

=== Twentieth century ===
In 1903, a fire destroyed the majority of Main Building, but it was rebuilt by the fall. In 1922, Main Building sustained damage from a tornado that caused significant damage all over the campus. Main Building was added to the National Register of Historic Places in 1973. In 1925, St. Edward's received its university charter. Most of the personnel at the time were Holy Cross priests and brothers. Women arrived at St. Edward's in 1966 as students for Maryhill College, a coordinate institution. By 1970, Maryhill was absorbed and St. Edward's became co-educational.

By 1971, the university granted bachelor's and master's degrees in business administration. Also added were the College Assistance Migrant Program, or CAMP (1972); a professionally oriented Theater Arts curriculum (1972); a degree program for adults called New College (1974); and Freshman Studies (1975). In 1984, Patricia Hayes became the second layperson to lead St. Edward's University. In 1990, enrollment reached 3,000 for the first time. This decade also ushered in civic initiatives and capital improvements.

St. Edward's endowment, as of 2015, stood at more than $92.4 million.

=== Expansion (1999–present) ===
George E. Martin served as the institution's 23rd president. From Fall 1999–Summer 2021, Martin oversaw a period of expansion for St. Edward's that included transforming the campus through the construction of many new buildings, doubling enrollment, growing the endowment, building global partnerships and founding the Holy Cross Institute to sustain the mission of the Brothers of the Congregation of Holy Cross. In February 2022, Montserrat Fuentes was inaugurated as the 24th president and first Hispanic president of St. Edward's University. As part of her presidential inaugural address, Fuentes unveiled the university's Strategic Plan 2027.

==== New buildings and renovations ====
Trustee Hall, a 33,000-square-foot (3,100 m^{2}) academic facility, opened in fall 2002. In 2003, Basil Moreau Hall, a co-ed freshmen residence hall opened. The John Brooks Williams Natural Sciences Center–North facility that opened in fall 2006, was the first of a two-building science complex and houses the biology and chemistry programs in the School of Natural Sciences. The John Brooks Williams Natural Sciences Center–South opened in fall 2013. It houses the computer science, mathematics and physics programs, and features 13 classrooms, advanced computer and math labs, and a 126-seat auditorium.

A 756-car parking garage opened in 2007. Major renovations of existing campus buildings include Premont Hall (2006), Fleck Hall (2007) and Doyle Hall (2009). A new residential village opened in 2009. A renovated campus library, formerly the Scarborough-Phillips Library, opened in fall 2013 as The Munday Library. The library features global digital classrooms for video conferencing, revamped reading, study and meeting spaces, an expanded digital collection, and writing and media centers. The library renovation was funded in 2011 by a $13 million donation from Bill and Pat Munday. The Mundays also donated $20 million for university scholarships in 2013. Both donations were school records.

== Academics ==
Academic rankings

Regional
- U.S. News & World Report: 5

National
- Forbes: 375

St. Edward's offers 8 master's degree programs and bachelor's degrees in more than 50 areas of study through the schools of Behavioral and Social Sciences, Education, Humanities, Natural Sciences and The Bill Munday School of Business. For 2025, U.S. News & World Report ranked St. Edward's #5 in Regional Universities West, #4 in Best Colleges for Veterans, and #2 in Best Undergraduate Teaching.

=== Theater ===
St. Edward's has a Theater Arts program (Mary Moody Northen Theatre), featuring a U/RTA contract with the Actors' Equity Association, allowing students who successfully complete the requirements of a Membership Candidate Program to become eligible to join Actors' Equity Association. In 2005, actor and environmentalist Ed Begley, Jr. brought his play, César & Ruben, to St. Edward's University for its Texas premiere.

=== Campus in France ===
In September 2008, St. Edward's started a portal campus in Angers, France to provide educational opportunities for European and American students. Faculty members at St. Edward's travel to Angers each semester to teach courses.

The St. Edward's in Angers, France program is in partnership with the Catholic University of the West.

== Student life ==
As of fall 2023, undergraduate enrollment was 2,731 with a student body that was approximately 60% female and 40% male. The percentage of applicants admitted in fall 2023 was 84%, with 14% of those admitted choosing to enroll.

More than 1,500 students live on campus in seven residence halls and three apartment communities. Students at St. Edward's University are also involved in over 100 campus organizations, including student government, service organizations, academic honor societies, cultural clubs, and intramural sports. As of 2024, 24 languages and 34 faith traditions are represented on campus.

=== Hilltop Views ===
Founded in 1987, Hilltop Views is a bi‑weekly student newspaper published by the School of Humanities and serving the St. Edward's University community. Editions are released every other week during the academic year, with content available daily online and in the alternating print edition. The newspaper covers four main sections—News, Sports, Life & Arts, and Viewpoints—and is independently run: budgets and editorial decisions are made by students without prior review by university administration. Student journalists, photographers, and designers develop articles, visuals, marketing, and copy-editing skills, and many serve as paid interns earning course credit. Archives available at The Portal to Texas History show it continues in print at least through May 2024.

== Athletics ==
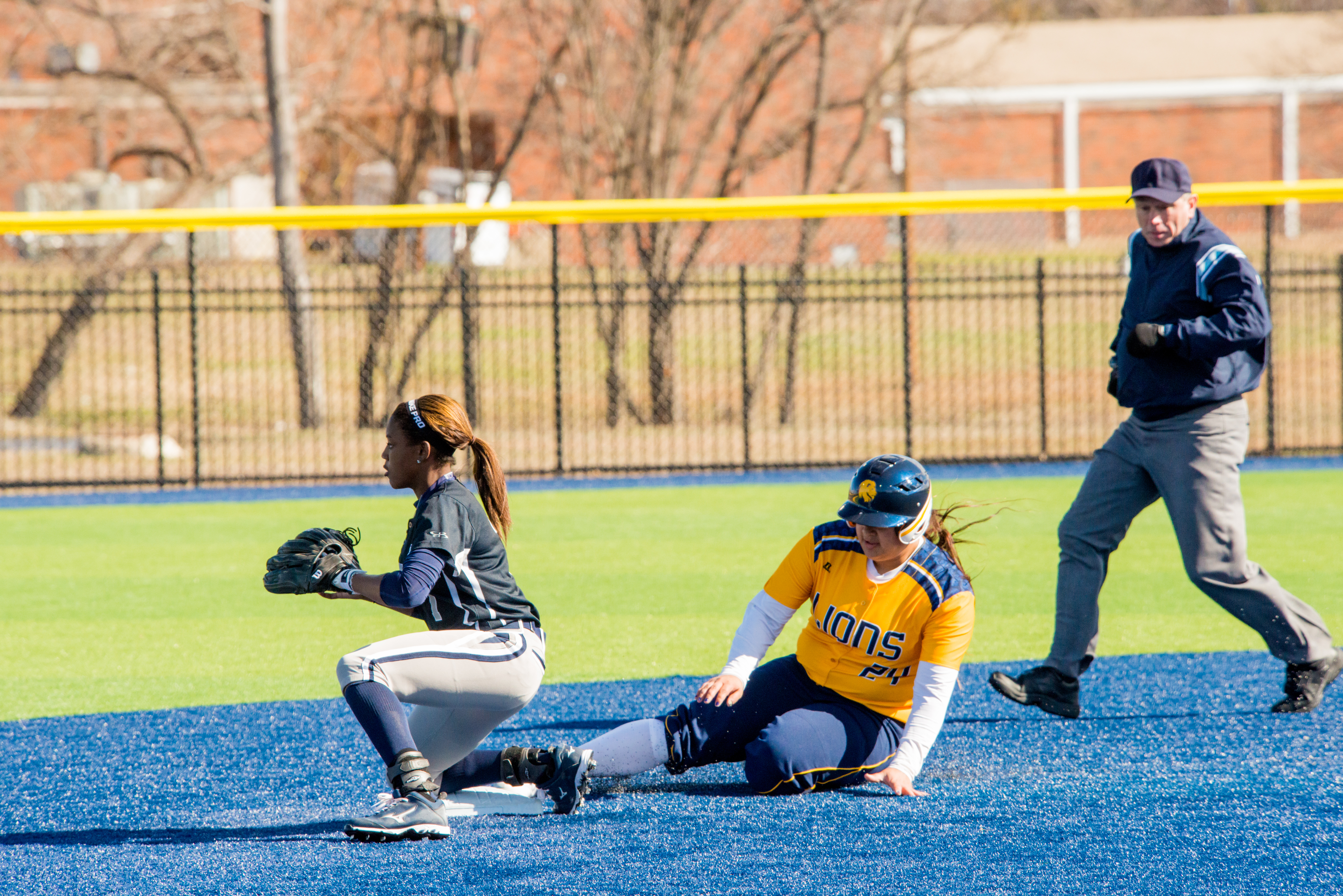
The Hilltoppers softball team in action against the Texas A&M–Commerce Lions in 2015

St. Edward's University's athletic teams, known as the Hilltoppers, compete in NCAA Division II and are members of the Lone Star Conference, which they joined in 2019 after previously competing in the Heartland Conference.

As of 2024, the university sponsors 16 varsity teams, including men's and women's basketball, cross country, soccer, track & field; men's baseball; women's softball and volleyball; and STUNT, an acrobatic team sport introduced in 2024–25. The university also supports co-ed cheerleading and esports programs.

Hilltopper teams have made 78 NCAA Division II postseason appearances and earned 62 conference championships. Since 2013, 66 student-athletes have been honored as All-Americans, showcasing the university's tradition of excellence in collegiate athletics.

== Notable alumni ==
- Joe Aillet – football coach
- Dennis Bonnen – politician
- Richard L. Buangan – U.S. ambassador to Mongolia (appointed 2022); alumnus in political science
- Sydney Chandler - actress
- George Edward Cire – judge
- Stacey Copeland – British athlete; first British woman to win a Commonwealth boxing title
- Laurentino Cortizo – former president of Panama (2019–2024); earned his MBA from St. Edward's University
- Salam Fayyad – former Palestinian prime minister
- Mary E. González – Texas state representative and LGBTQ+ advocate; earned M.A. in Social Justice from St. Edward's
- Luci Baines Johnson – chairman of the board, LBJ Asset Management Partners, daughter of US President Lyndon B. Johnson
- Jake Helgren – screenwriter, producer, and director
- Tavo Hellmund – racing promoter; responsible for bringing Formula 1 back to the U.S. and Mexico
- Robert C. Hilliard – civil rights attorney; argued landmark cases before the U.S. Supreme Court
- Abdul Karim al-Kabariti – Jordanian, former prime minister of Jordan
- Khalid bin Ahmed Al Khalifa – Bahraini Minister of Foreign Affairs
- Bill Killefer – baseball player
- Gabriel Luna – actor
- Amanda Marcotte – journalist
- Patrick Mason – economist
- Brandon Maxwell – fashion designer
- Taj McWilliams-Franklin – basketball player
- Roger Metzger – baseball player
- William Mulvey – Bishop of Corpus Christi
- Timothy Ogene – poet, novelist
- Bull Polisky – football player
- Jorge Quiroga – former president of Bolivia
- Silvestre Revueltas – composer
- Charles M. Robinson III – author and illustrator
- Charles Rogers – film director and screenwriter
- Mike Rosenthal – baseball player
- Tim Russ – actor
- Fermín Revueltas Sánchez – painter
- Mel Stuessy – football player
- Devon Walker – comedian
- Emily Wolfe – rock guitarist and singer-songwriter; released multiple albums and has an Epiphone signature guitar
- John Andrew Young – politician

== Notable faculty ==
- Mark Cherry
- Carrie Fountain
- Hollis Hammonds
- Eamonn Healy
- Paula Mitchell Marks

== Gallery ==
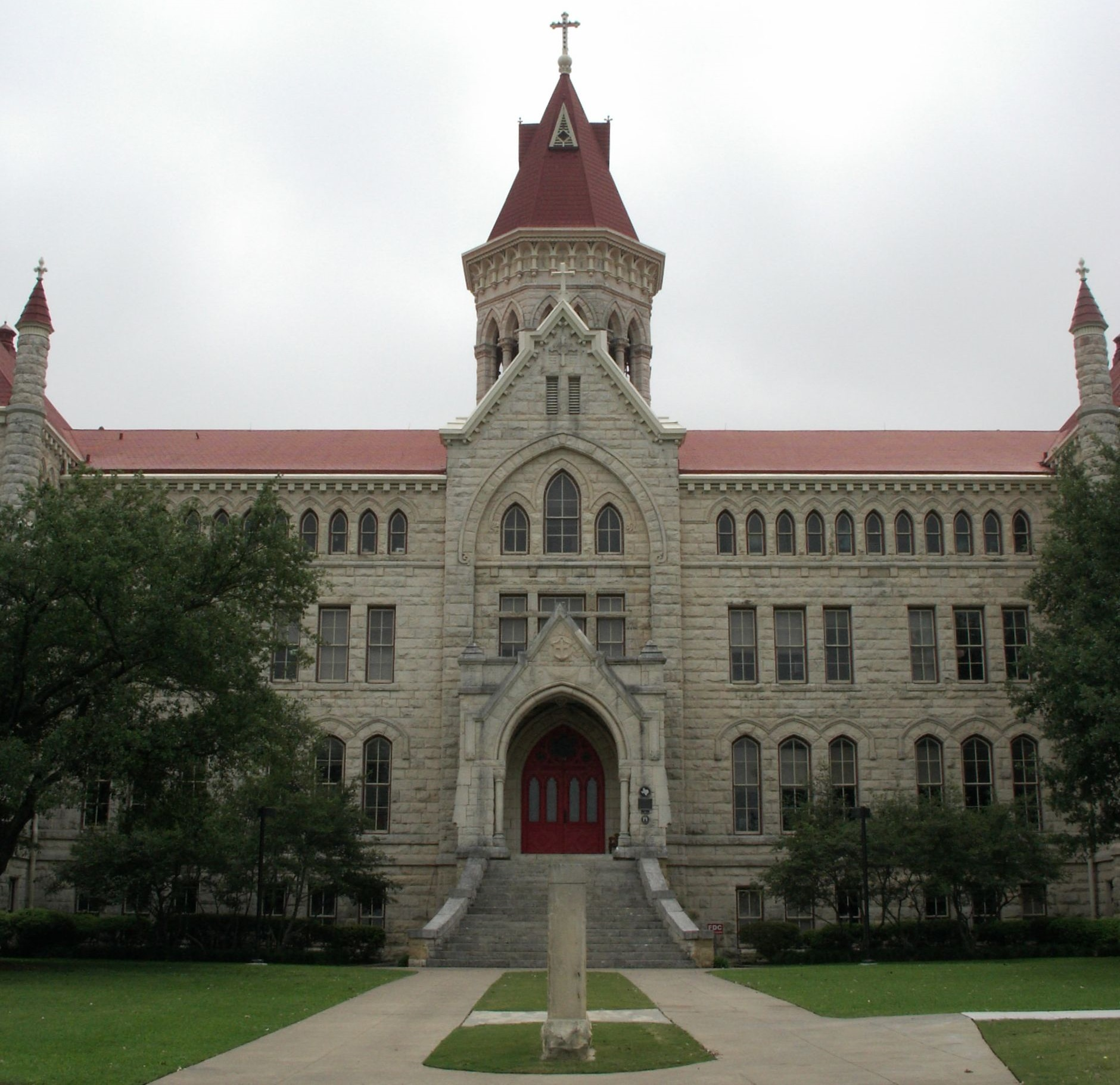
Main building

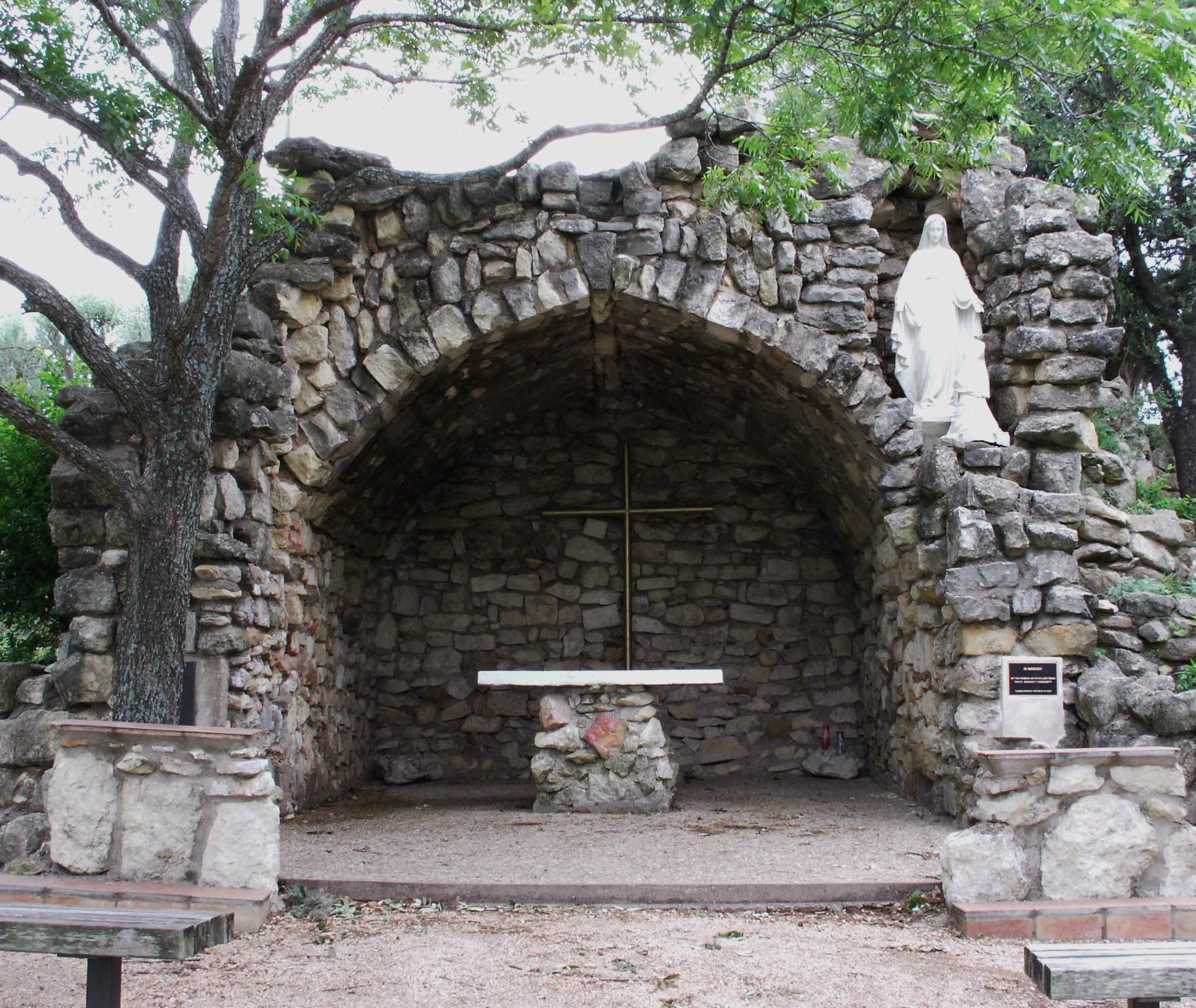
The grotto

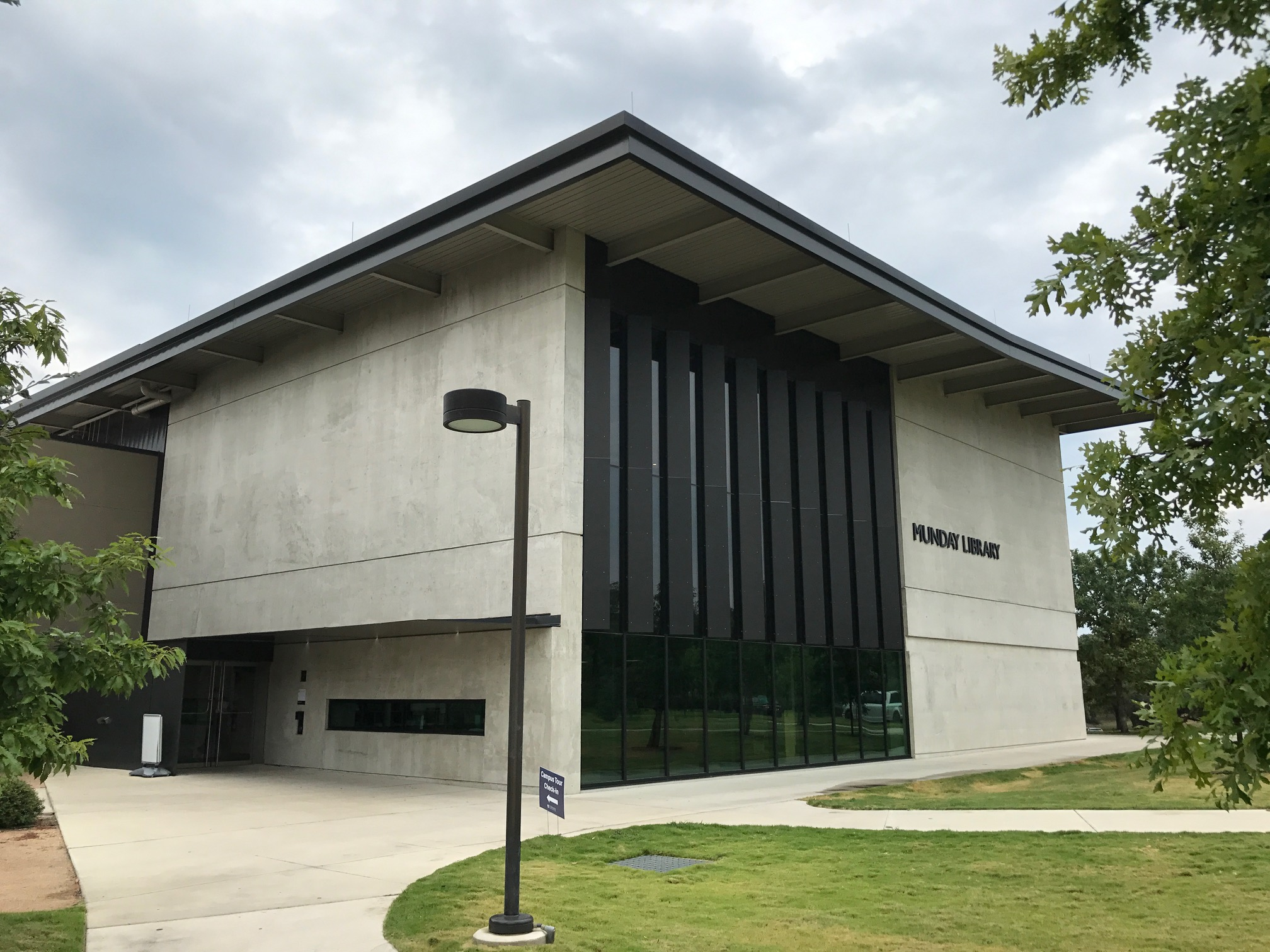
The Munday Library

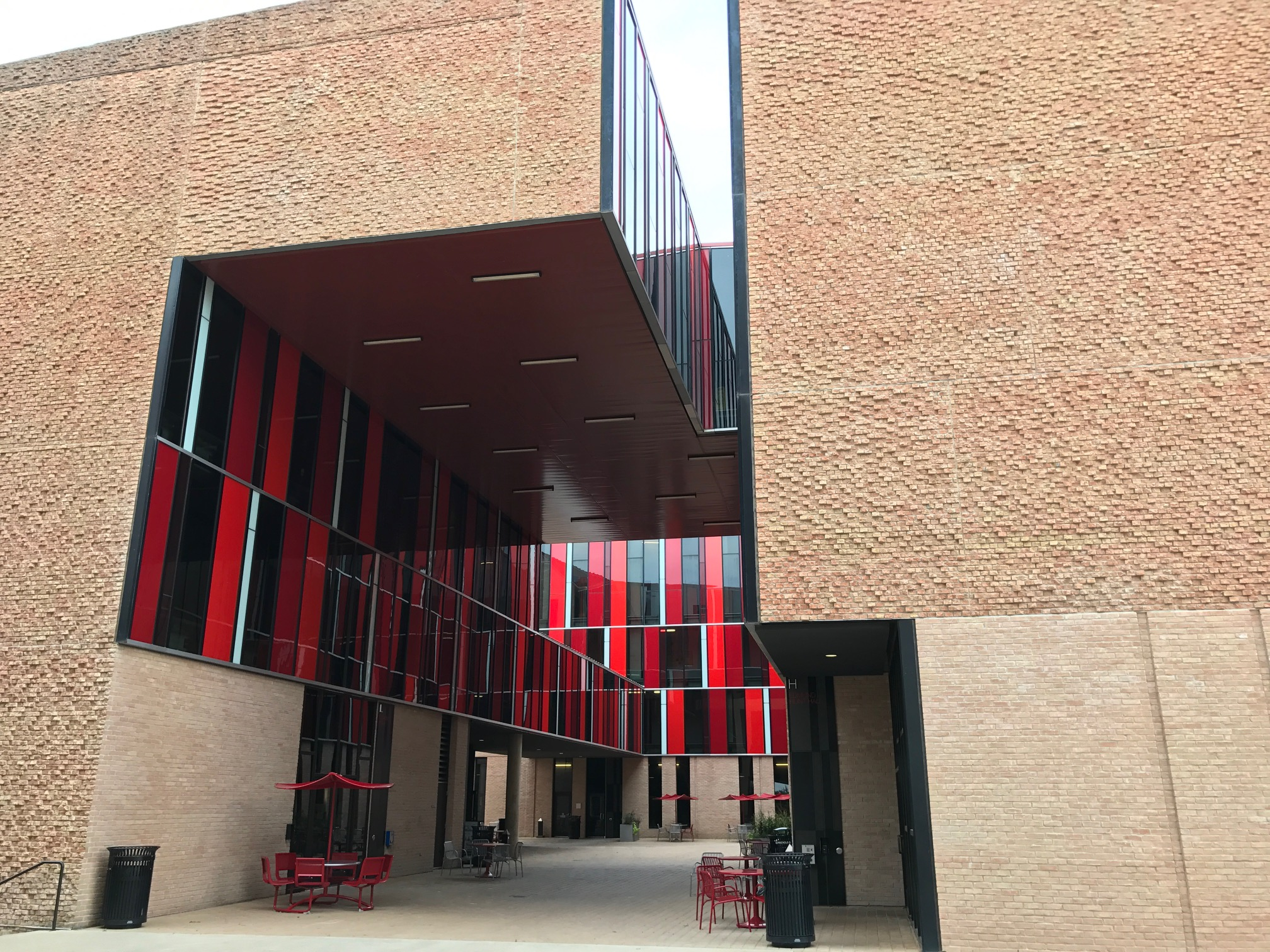
Dormitory

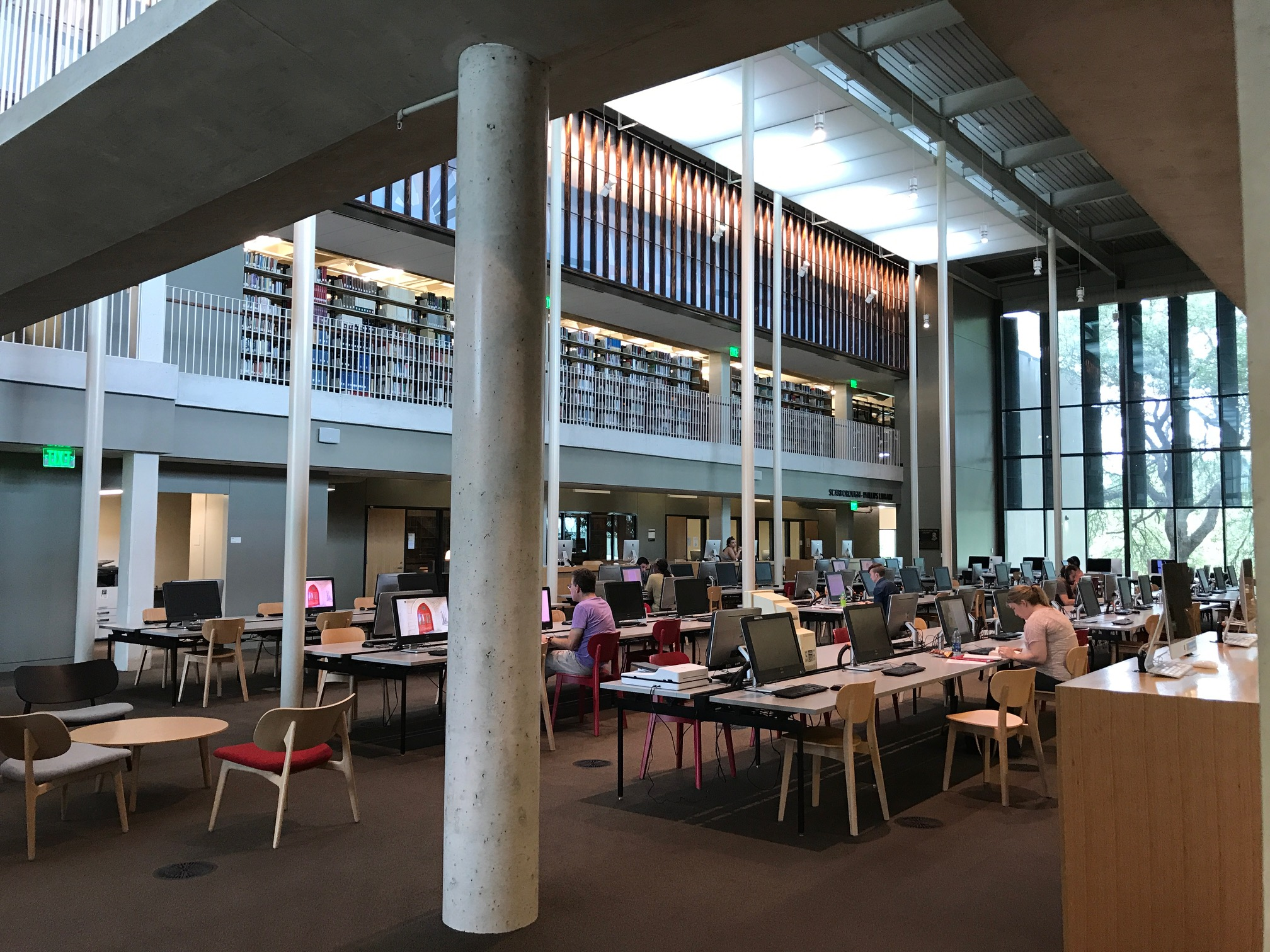
The Munday Library Inside
