= Victoria Winters =

- Dark Shadows character
- Alexandra Moltke portrays Victoria
- Portrayed by: Alexandra Moltke (1966–1968); Betsy Durkin (1968); Carolyn Groves (1969); Joanna Going (1991); Marley Shelton (2004); Bella Heathcote (2012)
- First appearance: June 27, 1966
- Last appearance: January 10, 1969
- Created by: Dan Curtis
In-universe information
- Occupation: Governess
- Mother: Elizabeth Collins Stoddard
- Half-sisters: Carolyn Stoddard
- Spouse: Peter Bradford/Jeff Clark (1968)
- Grandparents: Jamison Collins; Catherine Collins
- Uncles: Roger Collins
- First cousins: David Collins

Victoria "Vicki" Winters is a fictional character from the television Gothic soap opera Dark Shadows and its remakes of the same name. The role was originated by Alexandra Moltke on the ABC series from 1966 to 1968. After Moltke left to raise a family in 1968, actresses Betsy Durkin and Carolyn Groves briefly replaced her, for 10 episodes and 3 episodes respectively, before Victoria was written out completely. Jaclyn Smith, who was married to Dark Shadows actor Roger Davis at the time, was offered the role when Moltke left the show, but she declined.

In the 1991 Dark Shadows series, which aired on NBC, actress Joanna Going assumed the part. The character was subsequently portrayed by Marley Shelton in the 2004 series. In the Dark Shadows film, Victoria is played by Bella Heathcote. A good-natured governess with a mysterious past, she is the de facto female lead in the various incarnations of the story.

== 1966–1968 ==
=== Arrival and early days ===
Victoria Winters (Alexandra Moltke) was the prominent character on Dark Shadows for its first year of existence. For that year, each episode's opening narration began with, "My name is Victoria Winters..."

Victoria had been left at a foundling home in New York City, and thus, never knew her true parents—although monthly sums of money began to arrive mysteriously when she turned two. She received her surname from the season in which she arrived in New York. Evidently, Vicky attended some college before accepting the offer of a governess position in Collinsport, Maine. Upon her arrival in Collinsport, she met the brooding Burke Devlin (first played by Mitchell Ryan, later portrayed by Anthony George), with whom she would eventually become romantically involved. During the first episode, she also met a young waitress named Maggie Evans (Kathryn Leigh Scott) at the Collinsport Inn. Although Maggie derided Victoria for accepting the job at the Collinwood estate, the two women eventually became very good friends.

Victoria quickly became indispensable to Elizabeth Collins Stoddard (played by Joan Bennett), both as governess to Elizabeth's troubled young nephew David Collins (David Henesy) and companion to Elizabeth herself (although her initial quest to learn her true identity dismayed the family matriarch). For her own mysterious reasons, Elizabeth did not want Victoria to learn the truth. Victoria also became important as a family peacemaker, not to mention a stabilizing influence on Elizabeth's daughter, the rebellious Carolyn Stoddard (Nancy Barrett) and on the troubled David, son of Elizabeth's pompous and rather emotionally cold younger brother, Roger (Louis Edmonds). Slowly but surely, Victoria managed to form a bond with David. As she grew closer to Burke, she became embroiled in his old feud with the Collins family, all while she attempted to discover her origins. One early plotline involved Roger nearly dying in a car accident due to a bleed screw being removed from the hydraulic brake system of his car. Burke was a key suspect, but when Roger learned his own son David was the culprit, he dropped the investigation.

When fisherman Bill Malloy (Frank Schofield) threatened to reveal Roger's guilt in the manslaughter trial which led to Burke's wrongful conviction, he was murdered. Eventually, Victoria realized the killer was the disturbed caretaker Matthew Morgan (Thayer David). He kidnapped her and planned to kill her, but was frightened to death by the ghosts of Malloy, the Widows (women who had jumped from the cliffs after their husbands died), and Josette du Pres Collins (Kathryn Leigh Scott). Josette would later become a key figure in Victoria's life, as well as Dark Shadows history.

Shortly after Morgan's death, David's presumed-dead mother, Laura Murdoch Collins (Diana Millay) arrived, wanting to reunite with her son. Roger was reluctant, but Laura worked her charm on David, who was overjoyed to have a mother again. With the help of Josette's ghost and others, a suspicious Victoria realized Laura was a phoenix who planned to take herself and David to fiery deaths. Vicky saved him just in time. David was safe, the threat was gone, and Burke had finally settled his vendetta against the Collins family. David truly loved and trusted Vicky now, where before he had been hostile and spiteful toward her. Things were better than they had been for Victoria in some time, but that was not to last.

=== Enter Barnabas Collins ===
Shortly after the ordeal with Laura Collins had ended, a mysterious man named Jason McGuire (Dennis Patrick) arrived in Collinsport and immediately convinced Elizabeth to let him stay at Collinwood. Victoria and the family were shocked (especially Carolyn) and put on the defensive when Jason's off-putting drifter friend Willie Loomis (played originally by James Hall for five episodes before John Karlen assumed, and became more well-known, in the role) joined him. Willie, a former small-time crook, soon proved too much even for Jason to put up with, and he ordered Willie to get out of town. Before leaving town, following a fight with Burke at the Blue Whale because he was harassing Maggie, Willie heard from David that the Collins family ancestors were buried with their personal jewels; Willie decided to help himself to the jewels by breaking into the Collins family mausoleum. In an effort to abscond with the jewels of Naomi Collins (Joan Bennett), he inadvertently discovered a secret room in the rear of the crypt. Inside was a single coffin wrapped in large, heavy chains. Willie removed the chains and opened the coffin. Rather than finding a cache of jewelry, however, Willie unwittingly freed Naomi’s son, Barnabas Collins (Jonathan Frid), who had been turned into a vampire 170 years before and was later chained in his coffin by his friend Ben Stokes (Thayer David) on the request of Barnabas’s father, Joshua Collins (Louis Edmonds).

After being bitten by Barnabas, Willie then became his slave. Shortly after his release, Barnabas showed up at Collinwood and introduced himself, first to Elizabeth, then the rest of the family, as a 'cousin' from England. Victoria was charmed, but was more concerned with Jason's hold on Elizabeth especially when he forced her into marriage and, on her wedding day to Jason, Elizabeth could take no more and finally admitted the truth behind Jason’s hold on her: 18 years earlier, Elizabeth had killed her husband, Paul Stoddard (Dennis Patrick), and that Jason, a friend of Paul’s, had buried his body in the Collinwood basement in a trunk, and that Jason had been blackmailing her with this information. Elizabeth also mentioned that she had confided this to Victoria and made her promise to keep this secret to herself. However, when Burke and Collinsport Sheriff George Patterson (Dana Elcar) went down to the basement to investigate, they dig up the trunk, and later showed both Elizabeth and Roger that Paul’s body was not in the trunk: it was in fact empty. Jason, apprehended by Patterson’s deputy after fleeing Collinwood, sheepishly revealed privately to Elizabeth that Paul had only been stunned when she hit him, that Jason later helped Paul disappear and lied to Elizabeth in order to get blackmail money in exchange for his silence. Elizabeth was furious that she had not only wasted 18 years of both never leaving Collinwood to guard this secret but also that Jason let her live with the guilt of believing that she killed Carolyn’s father. Though Elizabeth does not press charges against Jason, he was then ordered by Patterson to leave Collinsport for good. Before leaving town he meets with Willie to get him many jewels for Jason to sell but is angry when Willie brings him only one item. Not satisfied, Jason tries to rob the Old House, now Barnabas' property on Collinwood, but after greedily ignoring Willie’s frightening warnings about Barnabas, Jason, opening Barnabas’ coffin, meets his end, via strangulation, when the vampire’s hand reaches up to Jason’s throat. Barnabas and Willie later carry Jason’s body to the Collins family mausoleum where Barnabas orders Willie to bury it in the mausoleum’s secret room.

Victoria grows concerned about her friend Maggie, who becomes withdrawn and moody to everyone around her. Maggie was, in actuality, being enslaved by Barnabas due to her strong resemblance to his true love, Josette. Barnabas kidnaps Maggie and begins feeding off her blood. She is found with suspicious marks on her neck. He plans to make her his bride by thus controlling or hypnotizing her into being Josette, but with the help of the ghost of his little sister Sarah Collins (Sharon Smythe), Maggie escapes. She is later institutionalized, and to protect her from the person who had kidnapped her, Maggie's father, Sam Evans (David Ford), boyfriend Joe Haskell (Joel Crothers), and Dr. Dave Woodard (Robert Gerringer) decide to make everyone in Collinsport, including Barnabas, believe that Maggie is dead, and she is kept well-guarded afterwards for some months. Believing himself to be in the clear because of Maggie's 'death,' Barnabas eventually gives up on her and later tells Willie that he has chosen another girl to be his new Josette: Victoria, and Barnabas begins to pursue her. Burke does not trust Barnabas and begins an investigation that ends only when Vicki begs him to stop. The men reach an uneasy truce, and Victoria and Burke become engaged before Burke goes on an ill-fated plane trip to South America in 1967. Victoria believes that Burke has somehow survived when his body cannot be found. With Burke gone, Barnabas begins to more actively pursue Victoria.

=== Time travel ===
During the second year of Dark Shadows, Victoria becomes unwittingly involved in Barnabas's sinister plans. After a séance to contact Barnabas' sister, Sarah Collins, Victoria is magically transported to the past in 1795. A time paradox between the years 1795 and 1967 causes a rift in the timeband; a carriage overturns in 1795, exchanging Victoria with its occupant, Phyllis Wick (Dorrie Kavanaugh), a governess hired by Naomi Collins. Victoria arrives at the Old Collins House and meets Collins ancestors who look just like the 20th Century Collins family she knows, but with different names, personalities, and relationships.

During this storyline, the origin of Barnabas's transformation into a vampire is finally revealed. Victoria makes the mistake of describing the future to the denizens of the past; she is soon seized by the fanatical Reverend Gregory Trask (Jerry Lacy) and accused of witchcraft. Despite the best efforts of Peter Bradford (Roger Davis), a law student and jailer who came to know Victoria and defended her at her trial, Victoria is sentenced to hang in 1796.

Although five months pass for Victoria in the past, Phyllis Wick (played by Margo Head in a recasting) experiences only five minutes in 1967. Realizing she is from the 18th century, the 20th century Collins family bombard her with questions, but Phyllis soon collapses in pain, clutching at her throat. At the exact moment of Victoria's "execution" she once again changes places with Phyllis, who dies in her place. Due to Victoria's very near-death experience, and as justice and revenge, a very angry Barnabas personally saw to it that Reverend Trask was sealed away in a very strong brick jail cell forever.

=== Jeff Clark and Goodbye ===
When Victoria returned to the present, a worried Barnabas believed that she may have learned his secret and bit her before she could tell anyone of her memories of 1795. He convinced her, under his spell, to elope with him, even though deep down Victoria still had feelings for Peter Bradford. On their way out of town, Victoria and Barnabas were involved in a car accident after seeing a man named Jeff Clark (Roger Davis) who resembled Peter. After the accident, the mysterious Dr. Eric Lang (Addison Powell) cured Barnabas of his vampirism, and Barnabas's hold over Victoria's mind was gone.

Now known as Jeff Clark, Peter worked for Lang and became involved with Victoria before learning his true identity. Peter/Jeff helped Lang build a Frankenstein-like creature, named Adam (Robert Rodan), who tried to kidnap Carolyn and make her his monster bride. During this time, Roger's new wife Cassandra Blair Collins (Lara Parker), who was actually the witch Angelique Bouchard Collins in disguise, created a Dream Curse that one person would pass on to another by telling them the dream. The dream would get worse for each person until finally Barnabas would be told. When Vicky had the dream, she did her best to keep it from Barnabas, but to stop her pain, Barnabas, who genuinely cared for Victoria now, made her tell him. He then had the dream, woke up, and was bitten by a vampire bat, but survived.

After Dr. Lang was killed by a spell brought by Cassandra in an attempt to stop him from bringing Adam to life, Barnabas and his ally Dr. Julia Hoffman (Grayson Hall) were forced to create a mate for Adam. That mate, Eve (Marie Wallace), had the life force of Peter's evil lover Danielle Rogét (Erica Fitz) from the 18th century. She made him realize his true identity and planned to reunite with him, but Adam strangled her. After finding out that he really was Peter Bradford, Jeff faded away into 1795. A despondent Victoria (played by Betsy Durkin in a recasting) soon followed. Barnabas traveled back in time and rescued both Victoria (recast again and played by Carolyn Groves) and Peter from the machinations of the evil witch Angelique before returning to the present. Victoria, however, remained behind in the year 1795 with Peter and was never seen again in the series.

Victoria was thought to have lived happily ever after, but in 1970, the ghost of Peter Bradford appeared and told antique store owner Phillip Todd (Christopher Bernau) that Victoria had been killed by the Leviathans, the same otherworldly creatures which were battling Barnabas Collins at that time. Peter's ghost tried to convince Philip to destroy the Leviathan leader, Jeb Hawkes (Christopher Pennock). Angelique found out about what was going on and told Peter Bradford to return to his grave, as she was going to take her own vengeance against Jeb and the Leviathans (which she did). Victoria's inexplicable off-screen death came about when Dennis Patrick was unable to reprise the role of Paul Stoddard whose ghost would return to take revenge on Jeb. Another factor involved Alexandra Moltke's decision not to return to the series when asked. Thus, Victoria was apparently killed off in a fit of pique. Most Dark Shadows fans tend to ignore this development as it makes little sense that Jeb existed at the same time Victoria and Jeff departed Collinsport.

Victoria's position as governess went to Maggie Evans. Victoria was last mentioned in 1970 when the ghost of Gerard Stiles (Jim Storm) haunted Collinwood. Barnabas asked a possessed David to name the governess he had had before Maggie; David could not do so. David and Hallie Stokes (Kathleen Cody) then gave Daphne Harridge (Kate Jackson)'s suddenly materialized ghost some of Victoria's old clothes to wear.

== 1991 revival ==
In the NBC 1991 primetime revival of the series, Victoria Winters was played by Joanna Going. The first and only season consisted of a retelling of the early Barnabas (Ben Cross) and 1795 saga, with the main difference being that this time, Vicki, not Maggie (Ely Pouget), was the spitting-image of Josette. If the series had continued (as with the original), there were plans to reveal that Victoria was Elizabeth (Jean Simmons)'s illegitimate daughter.

== Return to Collinwood ==
In 2003 Dan Curtis Productions approved a full-cast audio drama Return to Collinwood. During the reading of Elizabeth Collins Stoddard's will, the mystery surrounding Victoria Winters (which was never revealed in the TV series) is finally resolved. Carolyn learns that Elizabeth had a child out of wedlock; Victoria is actually Carolyn's older sister. In the late 1960s, Victoria was transported into the past and has not been seen since. In the will, Elizabeth implores Carolyn to find Victoria and bring her home.

== 2004 pilot ==
In the unaired WB 2004 pilot episode for a potential new series, Victoria Winters was played by Marley Shelton. For the first time, the character was depicted as a blonde. As with the 1991 series, Victoria was identical to Josette.

== 2012 feature film ==
In the Tim Burton-Johnny Depp 2012 big-screen adaptation of Dark Shadows, Victoria Winters is played by Bella Heathcote. As with the subsequent incarnations of the series, Vicky is the spitting-image of Josette. Also, the roles of Maggie Evans and Victoria Winters were combined for the film. When first meeting Vicki it is revealed that her real identity is Maggie Evans, but she changes it to Victoria Winters while on a train ride to Collinwood where, as in the original series, she has been employed as David (Gulliver McGrath)'s governess. It is presumed that she changed her name because she didn't want anyone to learn of her strange past to find her or send her back to the insane asylum.

Upon first meeting her, Barnabas (Depp) instantly mistakes her for his lost Josette and instantly becomes smitten with her. He decides to become close to her and to try to make her fall in love with him. During the film it is shown that the ghost of Josette communicates with Victoria and is at a later point revealed that Victoria was Josette reincarnated.

By having Victoria being the reincarnation of Josette the film shows Victoria dealing with her past life regression issues until it finally becomes clear to her in the end. At the party scene when Barnabas and Victoria are outside Victoria unmasks to him about her childhood and they kiss. Angelique (Eva Green) walks in and sees them and becomes furiously angry and jealous. A few scenes later, after saving David from a falling disco ball, Victoria sees what Barnabas truly is and becomes afraid and flees.

Late in the film Angelique places the same curse on Victoria as she had done to Josette, i.e. to jump off the cliff and kill herself. A little later at the cliff, Victoria is stopped just in time by Barnabas and she tells him to either make her into a vampire or she'll jump. Barnabas refuses and she jumps, but he jumps after her and bites her. This turns her into a vampire before hitting the rocks and saves her from being killed. When Victoria reawakens, her modest new fangs show she now is also a vampire and she tells Barnabas to call her Josette. Barnabas concludes that his curse has ended as they kiss and the seawater hits them.

== Character development ==
Dan Curtis first dreamed of a dark-haired girl riding a train to an estate, which was the inspiration for Dark Shadows. In Shadows on the Wall, the series' bible, Victoria was initially called Sheila March until the name was changed to suggest a more regal, older time. Her search for answers to her mysterious past, which was the driving force behind her accepting the governess position at Collinwood, would have originally led to the revelation that Victoria was the product of an affair between Paul Stoddard and an unknown woman. Elizabeth was to have discovered Victoria's existence the night she thought she had killed Paul, and her guilt over his death prompted her to send money to the Foundling Home. However, these plans were eventually scrapped when the Dark Shadows production team decided that Victoria would be Elizabeth's illegitimate daughter instead. This was due, in part, to Alexandra Moltke's close resemblance to Joan Bennett. In 1987, Bennett recorded a special video for fans in which, in character as Elizabeth, revealed that Victoria was her daughter.

As the Adam/Eve storyline of 1968 began to wind down, Ron Sproat was in the stages of slanting the plot to reveal Victoria's lineage when Moltke left the series due to her pregnancy. She was briefly replaced twice, but neither actress was (reportedly) accepted by the audience. Attempts were made to persuade Moltke to return, but, unhappy with her diminished role and content to be a stay-at-home mother to her new son Adam Isles, she declined. Any and all plans for the character were ultimately shelved, and Victoria was unceremoniously written out with an off-screen 18th-century death.

== Big Finish audio dramas ==
Although Victoria herself has not yet appeared in any of the Big Finish audio plays to date, the character has been mentioned in passing. In The House of Despair, Ed Griffin (Jamison Selby) tells Quentin Collins (David Selby) that the people of Collinsport have not forgotten how "that Winters girl" inexplicably disappeared. In Curse of the Pharaoh, Carolyn recalls Victoria having once dated Frank Garner (Conrad Fowkes).

Victoria was heavily referenced throughout And Red All Over, which featured the return of Mitchell Ryan as Burke Devlin. In the audio play, Burke determines to do all he can to find Vicki and bring her home.

== Heiress of Collinwood ==
Lara Parker's 2016 Dark Shadows novel centers Heiress of Collinwood around the return of Victoria Winters from her time in the past to find Collinwood deserted. The story continues on from Parker's previous book Wolf Moon Rising, and focuses on Vicki finally learning about her lineage.

== Music ==
Robert Cobert composed "Vicki's Theme" for the character and it was used primarily during the first year of Dark Shadows. Cobert made a new arrangement of the song, which was retitled "Missy" and featured in the 1970 film House of Dark Shadows. In 2011, the alternative rock group Cujo recorded "Victoria Winters" on their album Venusian Skies, a song about the character and referencing events from Dark Shadows.
