= Dark Shadows (2004 TV pilot) =

Unaired television pilot

- Based on: Dark Shadows by Dan Curtis
- Directed by: P. J. Hogan
- Starring: Alec Newman; Jessica Chastain; Marley Shelton

Production
- Producer: The WB
- Camera setup: Single
- Running time: Approx. 1 hour

Dark Shadows is a one-hour television pilot that was a remake of the 1966–1971 gothic soap opera television series Dark Shadows. The pilot was commissioned by The WB and produced in 2004, but not picked up for a series.

== Plot ==
Victoria Winters arrives by train to Collinsport, where she has been hired by the Collins family to tutor their youngest member, David. She is welcomed by matriarch Elizabeth Collins Stoddard, but experiences strange and disturbing dreams during her first night in the mansion. Victoria meets David, the son of Elizabeth's brother Roger Collins, who is constantly plagued by memories of his mother. Meanwhile, Willie Loomis and his girlfriend Kelly Vance go to the Collinwood crypt in search of treasure, and open the locked coffin of Barnabas Collins. In the process, Kelly cuts her hand and some blood falls upon the desiccated corpse, reviving him. A vampire, Barnabas drains Kelly of her blood and attacks Willie. He later attacks Elizabeth's daughter Carolyn Stoddard, who is walking to her car from a romantic encounter with Joe Haskell on his boat.

Barnabas presents himself at Collinwood as a distant relative from England, as Elizabeth and a less than enthusiastic Roger note his resemblance to the historical Barnabas Collins, whose portrait hangs in the mansion. Victoria feels immediately drawn to Barnabas. He asks permission to restore the Old House, and although Roger cautions him against it, he is determined to proceed. David and Victoria visit the Old House and Barnabas shows Victoria a portrait of Josette DuPres, which greatly resembles her. It hangs in Josette's room, which had been walled up until now. Willie, now working for Barnabas, bears fang marks and cannot say enough good things about Barnabas. At night David wakes and goes into the woods, where he removes a dagger from the ground. What might be the spirit of the witch Angelique is now apparently free. Meanwhile, Dr. Julia Hoffman confirms that Carolyn's wounds match those on Kelly's recently discovered corpse. Carolyn, late at night at the hospital, wakes and looks longingly out the hospital window, murmuring "Come back." When Victoria drives back to Collinwood she seemingly hits Angelique with her car. The disfigured Angelique screams, "He's mine!"

== Cast ==
- Alec Newman as Barnabas Collins: An undead vampire accidentally released after being locked away for 200 years. He is tormented by his curse.
- Marley Shelton as Victoria Winters: A beautiful, twentysomething woman hired to tutor young David Collins, and an exact double of Barnabas' 1790s fiancée, Josette DuPres.
- Jessica Chastain as Carolyn Stoddard: Elizabeth's twentysomething daughter, who still lives at Collinwood.
- Alexander Gould as David Collins: The 9-year-old, troubled son of Roger Collins.
- Martin Donovan as Roger Collins: David's father, a ruthless businessman.
- Kelly Hu as Dr. Julia Hoffman: The Collins family physician, and a close friend to Roger and Elizabeth.
- Ivana Miličević as Angelique: A beautiful, vindictive witch. She has come back from death to either reunite with Barnabas, or destroy him.
- Matt Czuchry as Willie Loomis: A former Collinsport high school football star who works as a handyman at Collinwood.
- Jenna Dewan as Sophia Loomis: Willie's younger sister, a maid at Collinwood.
- Blair Brown as Elizabeth Collins Stoddard: Roger's older sister. Her husband mysteriously absent, she lives a solitary life with Roger and Carolyn in Collinwood.
- Jason Shaw as Joe Haskell, a fisherman and Carolyn's boyfriend.
- Alexis Thorpe as Kelly Vance, Willie's greedy girlfriend.
- Michael D. Roberts as Sheriff Patterson
- E.J. Callahan as Old Man on Train
- Nathan Weiss as Boy in Devil Costume
- Doug Jones as Demon on Train, Barnabas in Crypt

The pilot included new characters not previously shown in the original or the 1991 versions of the series, including Sophia Loomis and Kelly Vance. Characters Maggie Evans, Sam Evans and Sarah Collins from the prior versions were included in the script, but did not appear in the filmed pilot (although Sarah is mentioned by David).

Alec Newman went on to play a grown up David Collins in an audio series of Dark Shadows produced by the British company Big Finish, which was created as a continuation of the first T.V. series and starred many of the original actors.

== Production ==
TV Guide reported in November 2003 that The WB had secured the rights to adapt the 1966–1971 gothic soap opera Dark Shadows into a new television series. Created by Dan Curtis, Dark Shadows had previously been remade as a short-lived 1991 prime time series. A pilot was commissioned and produced in 2004. Not wanting to have two vampire shows in competition with each other, The WB canceled the Buffy the Vampire Slayer spin-off Angel to make room for Dark Shadows in the 2004–2005 television season.

With a budget of $6 million, the pilot was written by Mark Verheiden. It starred Alec Newman as Barnabas, Marley Shelton as Victoria, Blair Brown as Elizabeth, Martin Donovan as Roger, Kelly Hu as Dr. Hoffman, and Jessica Chastain as Carolyn. The pilot was cast younger than previous adaptations, and was the first iteration of Dark Shadows with diverse casting for major characters. Todd McIntosh was the lead makeup artist, with prosthetics built by Andrew Clements. They created a series of looks for Barnabas in varying stages of decomposition as he transitions back to the appearance of a living man. The original director, Rob Bowman, backed out of the project at the last minute due to other commitments, and was replaced by P. J. Hogan. Curtis, Hogan, and The WB reportedly all had different visions for the series. The pilot was filmed at the Greystone Mansion in Beverly Hills, California, which also served as the Collinwood Mansion for the previous 1991 remake.

The pilot was screened for The WB in June 2004, but was not picked up for a series. WB chairman Garth Ancier said in July 2005, "We had a new director [Hogan] come in who was accomplished in movies but frankly didn't do a particularly good job ... The script was terrific, but creatively, the end result did not come out the way we'd all hoped for." Jeff Thompson wrote in The Television Horrors of Dan Curtis that The WB later regretted its decision, as the 2004–2005 season saw the debut of several popular "mystical and quirky" series like Lost, Desperate Housewives, Medium, Ghost Whisperer, and Supernatural.

== Release ==
The pilot never aired because The WB passed on the series. It was screened at a 2005 Dark Shadows festival in Los Angeles, with subsequent showings at the 2006 Dark Shadows 40th Anniversary Festival in Brooklyn, New York, the 2008 Dark Shadows Festival in Burbank, California and the 2009 Dark Shadows Festival in Elizabeth, New Jersey.

== Reception ==
In his book Dark Shadows, Harry M. Benshoff wrote, "Perhaps the most interesting thing about the pilot was its luridly lit visual design, one more reminiscent of Italian horror films by Mario Bava and/or Dario Argento than the original series." Critic Mark Dawidziak commented at the 2005 Dark Shadows Festival that much of the pilot was "lighted like a French whorehouse." Thompson praised the cast, in particular Newman and the female performers.
