= Barnabas Collins =

- Dark Shadows character
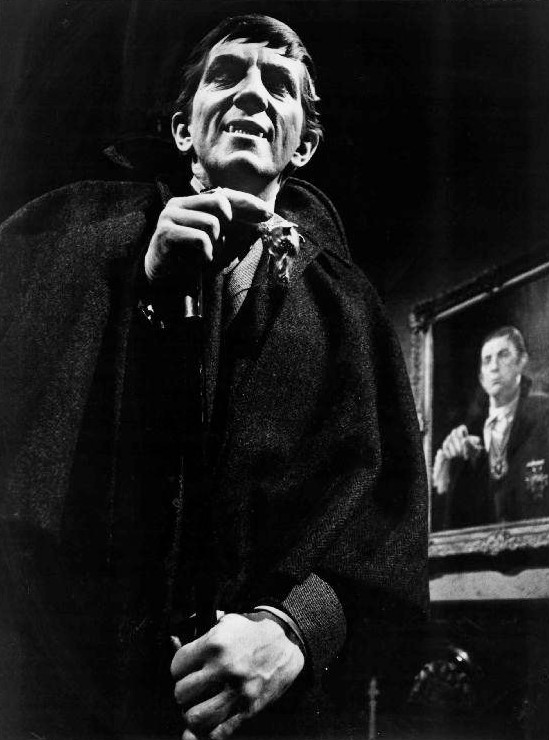
- Jonathan Frid as Barnabas Collins.
- Portrayed by: Jonathan Frid (1967–1971, 2010); Ben Cross (1991); Alec Newman (2004); Johnny Depp (2012); Andrew Collins (2006–Present, on audio)
- First appearance: April 18, 1967
- Last appearance: April 2, 1971
- Created by: Dan Curtis; Ron Sproat; Joe Caldwell
- Species: Vampire
In-universe information
- Father: Joshua Collins
- Mother: Naomi Collins
- Siblings: Sarah Collins
- Spouse: Angelique Bouchard (1795); Josette du Pres (parallel time)
- Sons: Bramwell Collins (parallel time); Unnamed son (parallel time)
- Grandparents: Caleb Collins
- Uncles: Jeremiah Collins
- Aunts: Abigail Collins
- First cousins: Niall Bradford
- Other relatives: Daniel Collins; Millicent Collins Forbes

Barnabas Collins is a fictional character, a featured role in the ABC daytime serial Dark Shadows, which aired from 1966 to 1971. Barnabas is a 175-year-old vampire in search of fresh blood and his lost love, Josette. The character, originally played by Canadian actor Jonathan Frid, was introduced in an attempt to resurrect the show's flagging ratings, and was originally to have only a brief 13-week run. He was retained due to his popularity and the program's quick spike in ratings, and virtually became the star of the show.

A defining feature of Barnabas' character development is his gradual but persistent transformation from a sinister, frightening creature of the night into the show's protagonist, who selflessly, heroically and repeatedly risks his "life" to save the Collins family from catastrophe.

In the 1991 NBC revival version of Dark Shadows, British actor Ben Cross played the role of Barnabas Collins. Alec Newman played the part in the unreleased 2004 pilot film. In the recent series of audio dramas produced by Big Finish Productions, beginning in 2006, Barnabas is portrayed by Andrew Collins, while Frid returned to portray the role a final time in 2010 in the audio drama The Night Whispers. The role is played by Johnny Depp in director Tim Burton's 2012 film, Dark Shadows.

Barnabas Collins was the main character in most of the 32 Dark Shadows paperback novels written by Marilyn Ross (a pseudonym of Canadian author W.E.D. Ross) from the late 1960s to the early '70s. Ross wrote hundreds of novels in several genres and under various pseudonyms.

TV Guide named Barnabas Collins #8 in its 2013 list of The 60 Nastiest Villains of All Time.

== Origin ==
Barnabas Collins (Jonathan Frid) was born in 1770, as the son of Joshua Collins (Louis Edmonds) and Naomi Collins (Joan Bennett), in Collinsport, Maine. Barnabas developed close ties with his uncle Jeremiah Collins (Anthony George). During the flashback, Barnabas intended to marry an heiress from Martinique named Josette du Pres (Kathryn Leigh Scott), but had a brief affair with Angelique Bouchard (Lara Parker), Josette's maidservant.

On Angelique's arrival in Collinsport for the wedding in 1795, Barnabas was determined not to resume his affair. The spurned Angelique Bouchard, a practitioner of witchcraft, used a number of spells to manipulate Barnabas and his family and force his agreement to marry her. Barnabas discovered Angelique's duplicity, and shot her. With what she believed to be her dying words, she took revenge on Barnabas by summoning a vampire bat from hell to attack him. Barnabas fell extremely ill and died. Angelique survived and attempted to rescind the curse, but was unsuccessful.

Barnabas shortly thereafter rose as a vampire, and soon strangled Angelique. Barnabas later frightened his aunt Abigail (Clarice Blackburn) to death, and left the hatefully fanatic witch-hunter Reverend Gregory Trask (Jerry Lacy) entombed alive in the Old House basement. His sister Sarah Collins (Sharon Smythe) died of pneumonia after a cold night spent hiding in the woods from her deceased brother. Adding to Barnabas' grief, his mother Naomi committed suicide after discovering his secret. Barnabas blamed Angelique for the deaths of both Sarah and Naomi, and also blamed Lt. Nathan Forbes (Joel Crothers), who had told Naomi about him. Barnabas strangled Forbes, and attempted to transform Josette into a vampire. Josette was willing, if not fully cognizant of what this would entail, until Angelique revealed a vision of what she would become. Fleeing from Barnabas, Josette leapt off the cliffs of Widow's Hill to her death.

Unable to bear what he had become, Barnabas Collins asked his father, Joshua, to destroy him. Joshua Collins was unable to slay his son, and ordered servant Ben Stokes (Thayer David) to nail a cross to the inside lid of Barnabas' coffin and to wrap chains on its outside, forever imprisoning the vampire in a secret room of the family mausoleum at Eagle's Hill Cemetery.

== The return of Barnabas Collins ==
In 1967, while searching the Collins family crypt for their rumored lost jewels, Willie Loomis (John Karlen) stumbled upon the chained coffin in which Barnabas slept. Believing the coffin to contain the Collins family riches, Willie inadvertently released the vampire. Barnabas attacked Willie and turned him into his unwilling servant.

Barnabas Collins introduced himself to the modern Collins family as a cousin from England, a hard-working businessman never seen during the day. The family accepted this story, despite having never heard of him, because of his resemblance to the portrait of the ancestral Barnabas which hung in Collinwood. The thirsty Barnabas made victims of several Collinsport residents. He was particularly taken with waitress Maggie Evans (Scott), who resembled his long-lost love, Josette. Barnabas was told by David Collins (David Henesy) that Josette's spirit still haunted the Collinwood estate, where it periodically helped and protected others, including young David. Barnabas Collins kidnapped Maggie, hypnotized her to believe that she was Josette, and planned to make her his vampire bride. Maggie escaped with help from the ghost of Sarah Collins, but the emotional distress of being kidnapped caused Maggie to regress to a childlike mentality and to forget all that had happened. Barnabas Collins then targeted David's governess, Victoria Winters (Alexandra Moltke) as a potential consort. He tried to seduce her away from her fiancé Burke Devlin (George), and then to bite her. The ghost of Sarah appeared repeatedly throughout and warned Barnabas, who was tormented by a feeling of responsibility for her death, away from evil deeds.

Maggie was sent to Wyndcliff Sanitarium, where Dr. Julia Hoffman (Grayson Hall) tried to get her to remember what happened and to identify her kidnapper. Julia found that the answer lay somewhere at Collinwood, and discovered who and what Barnabas was. Julia fell in love with Barnabas and attempted to cure him, and hypnotized Maggie to forget everything Barnabas had tried to do to her. Barnabas initially distrusted Julia, and when her medical cure failed, viewed her as a risk who would be able to expose his true nature. He attempted to kill Julia, or to drive her mad so that no one would believe her accusations. Ultimately, Barnabas came to see Julia as a useful ally. The romantic relationship Julia desired never happened on-screen, but she became Barnabas' chief confidante and helped him many times, while Barnabas Collins became genuinely devoted to Julia and would go to extraordinary lengths to protect or rescue her when she ran afoul of enemies such as Angelique (eventually a firm friend), ghosts, and the ancient Leviathans.

== Barnabas's women ==
Barnabas Collins's great love was his fiancée from 1795, Josette du Pres, but throughout the show he had interest in many different women, including Maggie Evans, Victoria Winters and Roxanne Drew (Donna Wandrey). He wanted these women to share his vampire existence, and wanted Maggie and Victoria to assume the identity of Josette. His closest ally and friend was Dr. Julia Hoffman, who was quietly in love with him and supported his attempts to find happiness. While aware that Julia did have strong feelings for him, Barnabas' complex feelings for Julia evolved from initial fear and distrust to deep affection, devotion and protection. At one point, Barnabas Collins admitted to Willie Loomis that he cared for Julia more than he appeared to.

== Other appearances ==
The 1970 MGM film House of Dark Shadows centers on the release of Barnabas Collins from his coffin by Willie Loomis. Unlike Frid's television portrayal of Barnabas, the Barnabas featured in the film was truer to a typical evil vampire, who by the end of the film had killed half of the Collins family. Barnabas himself is killed by Jeff Clark (Roger Davis), Maggie's boyfriend, and a dying Willie Loomis, when Barnabas tries to make Maggie Evans his vampire bride. Barnabas does not appear in the sequel, Night of Dark Shadows, which focuses on another relation, Quentin Collins (David Selby).

In the 2012 film Dark Shadows, Barnabas is played by Johnny Depp as a somewhat-modernized version of the character from the original series. He has a deep obsession with Josette du Pres (Bella Heathcote), has no forgiveness for those who betray him, and believes that his curse can be reversed. He shows deep emotions for his modern family members, whose lives he longs to be part of. He displays his television counterpart's powers and abilities, while subject to his cold vampire instincts. Barnabas tries to win the love of David Collins (Gulliver McGrath)'s governess Maggie Evans (Heathcote), using the pseudonym Victoria Winters, who reminds him of his lost beloved Josette. Depp's version is up to date with popular culture and has a strong taste for rock music. He wears a hair and clothing style similar to his late 1960s counterpart, but dresses more colorfully. His character is portrayed as somewhat more sexually active and eccentric than before. This incarnation has a different relationship with Dr. Julia Hoffman (Helena Bonham Carter), who never becomes his ally.

== Personality ==
Barnabas often blamed his moments of cruelty on his transformation into one of the undead or "nosferatu," but other characters revealed that Barnabas was not always the reluctant victim that he claimed. He carried on a sexual dalliance with the obsessed Angelique despite his claim of love for Josette, which set in motion many tragedies in his life. Jealousy and wounded male pride caused him to fatally wound his uncle in a duel, after Jeremiah's elopement with Josette. He attempted to back out of his agreement to marry Angelique after she cured his sister Sarah of illness. Given proof that his newlywed bride Angelique was a witch, he attempted to murder her. A drunken Ben Stokes admitted that Barnabas, prior to his change, "... weren't no good then, neither — but now, he's worse!" When the vampire tried to silence his own father by killing him, an astonished Joshua Collins exclaimed: "You would kill even me! You must have always had so much hatred in you. No one could be filled with it so quickly!" While many of his flip-flopping infatuations with nubile young women could be attributed to his vampire curse and his need to find a vampire bride, his romantic choices during his periods as a human were equally immature and baffling. In later interviews, Jonathan Frid admitted this was all part of the character's success, "... the lies he told to himself."

However harsh or impulsive he may have been, Barnabas is nevertheless not without a conscience, either as a human or as a vampire. He is shown to be capable of feeling guilt for wrongs committed, as well as love for other people. For example, he shows a softer side for Dr. Julia Hoffman as he becomes closer to her, and once mentioned that he cared for her more than he let on. He risked his "life" whenever she was in grave trouble, and only when the Leviathans gave the order to have Julia killed did Barnabas have the strength to break free of their control. When Angelique tried to endanger Julia's life, an enraged Barnabas warned her that if she ever tried to harm Julia again, he would personally see to her own destruction. His confrontation with Angelique over the deaths that his curse had caused revealed that he did care deeply for his mother Naomi, Sarah and for Josette.

== Powers ==
Barnabas' abilities mimic those of the classic vampire Dracula, and include immortality, superhuman strength, superhuman speed, hypnotism, shape-shifting and teleportation. However, Barnabas has also been known to use sorcery. In an early storyline, he attempted to drive Julia mad by conjuring the spirit of her dead colleague, Dave Woodard (Peter Turgeon). In 1975, Barnabas briefly resurrected Josette Du Pres, who in the 20th century would warn the Collins family of approaching danger while wandering the Collinwood halls, and he used visions to lure Reverend Trask into a fatal trap. These seemingly magical abilities were never explained, but made Barnabas a deadly protagonist.

== Notes ==
Jonathan Frid first appeared as Barnabas Collins in 1967 in episode #211, but his hand was briefly seen in the climax to episode #210, prior to Frid's introduction. Series regular Timothy Gordon (uncredited) provided the hand, which was first seen choking Willie Loomis.

In a 1971 TV Guide article, Dark Shadows head-writer Sam Hall discussed the outline the show's finale would have taken had it not been canceled sooner than anticipated. Among other things, the plans involved Barnabas, a vampire once again, becoming mysteriously ill. Julia, deducing that his illness was due to his unique connection to man-made creature Adam (Robert Rodan), would travel to Singapore to treat Adam, and there fall seriously ill herself. The now-recovered Barnabas would come to her and, at long last, declare his love and ask her to become his wife. Knowing that Angelique would never allow Julia to live, they would remain in the Far East after their marriage, and Julia would permanently cure Barnabas of his vampirism.

== Relationships ==
- Josette du Pres; fiancee
- Angelique Bouchard Collins; rival, later wife
- Victoria Winters; romantic interest
- Maggie Evans; romantic interest
- Sarah Collins; younger sister
- Roxanne Drew; romantic interest
- Dr. Julia Hoffman; confidante, friend
- Quentin Collins; distant cousin
- Willie Loomis; human slave and daytime protector

== Influence on Popular Culture ==
Roots reggae artist Lone Ranger (musician) had a number one UK reggae chart album in 1980 entitled Barnabas Collins, the lyrical themes of which are based on the character and related television show of the same name. He is regarded as one of the most lyrically inventive deejays of his era, and was a major influence on British deejays of the early 1980s.
