= Collinwood Mansion =

Fictional house on TV show Dark Shadows

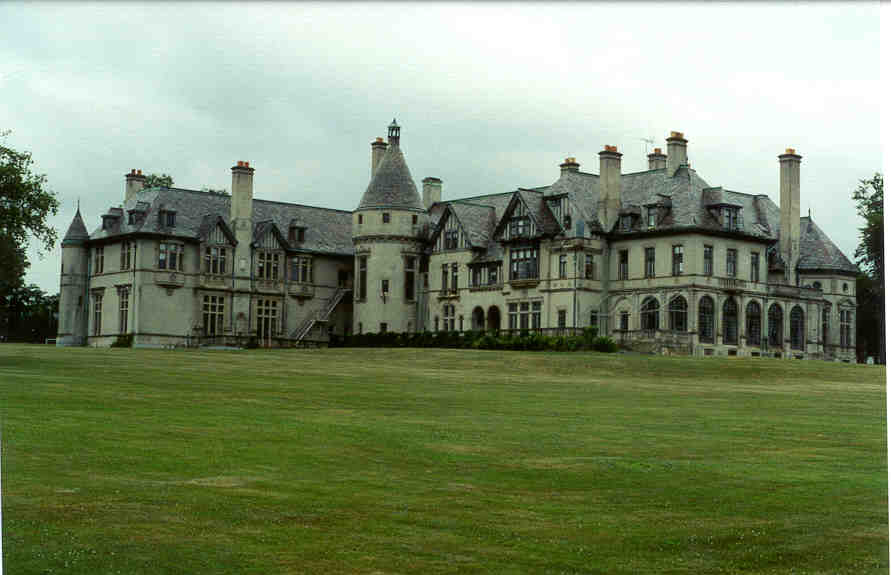
Collinwood, as represented in the original show by Seaview Terrace (later known as Carey Mansion) in Newport, Rhode Island

Collinwood Mansion is a fictional house featured in the Gothic horror soap opera Dark Shadows (June 1966– April 1971), built in 1795 by Joshua Collins (Louis Edmonds). Collinwood has been home to the Collins family and sometimes unwelcome supernatural visitors since its inception.

The house is located near the town of Collinsport, in Hancock County, Maine, overlooking the Atlantic Ocean. Due to frightening rumors and legends, almost every resident of the town is afraid to drive by the house.

The house has more than 40 rooms, most of which are closed off due to the lack of inhabitants and financial reasons. It features numerous secret passageways, including one leading to a parallel timeline, a time-traveling stairway, and a room perceived as a playroom by some and a linen closet by others. Most of the household activity revolves around the drawing room and foyer, and occasionally extends to the kitchen, dining room, and study.

Collinwood is said to unsettle both its residents and visitors due to a morbid past filled with deaths, acts of violence, and other misfortunes.

== Interior ==
The house had three main sections to it — the central area that was still in use, and an east wing and west wing that were generally closed off and unused. The following rooms appeared on-screen throughout the run of the original series:

Foyer and main drawing room — This was the principal setting for much of the series. A grand stairway and mezzanine overlooks the foyer and leads to the second floor. The parlor had large bay windows that overlooked the ocean. The paneling on the back wall contained the entrance to a secret passage that led to Quentin Collins (David Selby)'s west wing study. Several portraits of Collins' family ancestors hang around the parlor and foyer — most significantly a portrait of Barnabas Collins (Jonathan Frid) from 1795 that hangs in an alcove by the main entrance.

Bedrooms — There are ten second-floor rooms in addition to servants' quarters in the back of the first floor. The two most often depicted were David Collins (David Henesy)'s room, and Victoria Winters (Alexandra Moltke)'s room. Both rooms were in the same hallway, with a door that led to the west wing (normally kept locked).

Basement — Used for storage. The basement had one locked room that was supposedly used as a makeshift grave for Paul Stoddard (Dennis Patrick), Elizabeth Collins Stoddard (Joan Bennett)'s husband, making it chiefly noteworthy. In reality, Paul wasn't actually buried there, and he was very much alive.

Breakfast room — This room was shown only occasionally in the first year of the show. In one scene, early in the morning, Roger Collins (Louis Edmonds) walks out the door to the terrace and stretches. In the real life house used for the exteriors, Roger just walked out of the actual breakfast room.

Study — Located off the foyer, next to the parlor. It was only occasionally seen, but was used to house the 'remains' of Victoria after she was hanged in 1796 although she was really not dead but placed in suspended animation by Angelique Bouchard Collins (Lara Parker).

West Wing room — A large study filled with old papers. This is the scene for one of the series' first supernatural occurrences when David pulls a mean prank by locking Victoria in, trapping her there all night. The ghost of the recently murdered Bill Malloy (Frank Schofield) appeared to her.

Garden terrace — Just outside the foyer was the terrace. It has a water fountain, a small plaza and a gazebo.

Tower room — Structurally the house was constructed around a large central tower that contained an attic room. In 1796, this room was used temporarily to house Barnabas Collins' coffin. In 1897, Judith Collins Trask (Joan Bennett) housed Quentin's crazed wife Jenny (Marie Wallace) there.

Quentin Collins' study — A large private study used by Quentin in 1897. Judith Collins, Quentin's elder sister, had the entrance sealed up with her murderous husband, the Reverend Gregory Trask (Jerry Lacy) within. In 1968, David Collins and Amy Jennings (Denise Nickerson) discover a hole in the wall that leads to the room. In there, they find what they take to be Quentin's skeletal remains. The two children then encounter and become possessed by the spirits of Quentin and Beth Chavez (Terrayne Crawford).

Parallel Time room — One of the strangest rooms in the house, this grand bedroom suite was a conduit to an alternate reality. Normally it was one more unused east wing room. However, when viewing it from outside the doorway, characters could see the Collins family members of another world. In that other Collinwood, the room was the private quarters of Angelique, who was the first wife of Quentin (the lord of the manor in this reality) and mother of Daniel (the Parallel Time version of David). The inhabitants of that other reality were unaware that they were being observed (although Angelique and a few other Parallel Time characters saw into the “normal time” counterpart room occasionally). An invisible barrier usually kept the two worlds separate, but Barnabas and Dr. Julia Hoffman (Grayson Hall) were both able to pierce it. When a fire destroyed the Parallel Time Collinwood, the gateway to that other world was (presumably) broken for good. However, in 1840, Daphne Harridge (Kate Jackson) "discovered" it as well, and Lamar Trask (Jerry Lacy) pierced the barrier just before dying.

Playroom and stairway through time — In 1840, a particular room was used as a playroom for children. In 1970, the same room was used as a linen closet. Yet behind the room was a stairwell that the 1840 Quentin Collins placed an enchantment on. Quentin, a student of magical arts, constructed the stairway using magical means to make it ascend through time into the future. He believed his experiment was a failure, but actually succeeded. Barnabas and Julia used the stairway to travel back from 1995 to 1970. Later, Julia and later still Prof. Timothy Eliot Stokes (Thayer David) used the stairwell to travel from 1970 to 1840. After Barnabas, Julia and Prof. Stokes used the stairwell one last time to get back to 1970, Desmond Collins (John Karlen) destroyed it.

The 1970 film House of Dark Shadows included scenes set in a terrarium (in scenes cut from the theatrical release) and a swimming pool, but these were never shown in the original series.

== Estate ==
Collinwood mansion is the largest and most prominent building on a vast estate that shares the same name as the house. Although the Collinwood mansion was built in 1795, the Collins family has lived on the estate grounds since colonial times in other dwellings.

=== Old House ===
This was the first large house built by the Collins family. It was known as Collinwood before the larger house was built. Although not as big as Collinwood, it is large. When Joshua built the new house, he intended to bequeath the Old House to his son Barnabas as a wedding gift. After Barnabas' "death", the house was abandoned. It was inhabited for a time in the 1890's by a couple, Sandor (Thayer David) and Magda Rakosi (Grayson Hall), but by 1966, it had been vacant for decades and had fallen into ruin. A large, framed portrait of Josette Collins (née du Pres) hung in the parlor and in modern times, her spirit would emerge from it and dance around the porch. When Barnabas was released from his coffin in 1967, he renovated and inhabited the house (which at the time had no electricity, heat or plumbing). He kept his coffin in the basement, which also included a dungeon room that he used to imprison Maggie Evans (Kathryn Leigh Scott) but it turned out to have a secret escape passage to a cavern on the seashore. Julia installed a generator and conducted scientific experiments there — including her attempted cure for vampirism, and the creation of Eve (Marie Wallace). Barnabas still inhabited the Old House in 1971, at the series' end.

=== Caretaker's Cottage ===
When first seen, it was inhabited by Matthew Morgan (Thayer David), the estate handyman who murdered Bill Malloy. Later inhabitants were Laura Collins (Diana Millay) during her 1966–1967 incarnation and then Chris Jennings (Don Briscoe) in 1968–1970. In the 1897 story line, one night at the cottage, Quentin Collins, Evan Handley (Humbert Allen Astredo) and Jamison Collins (David Henesy) resurrected Angelique. Later inhabitants were Laura Collins. In 1840, Roxanne Drew (Donna Wandrey) lived there until her death by Angelique.

=== Coach House ===
A small property located on the estate where Jeb Hawkes (Christopher Pennock) lived in 1970.

=== Seaside shack ===
Only briefly seen, this is a hut located near the shore of the ocean. Laura Collins lured her son David there to immolate both him and herself. (She hoped to extend her "immortal phoenix" ability to him, thereby giving him eternal life.) After the cottage burned down it was apparently not restored.

=== Seaview ===
In Dark Shadows, there are two properties known as 'The House by the Sea' and 'Blair House.' Seaview is depicted as an unused property on the estate, featuring a large empty parlor and a small hallway to the front door. The house is described as a 1 1/2-story Cape Cod style, believed to be from the 1700's. It was previously used as Roger's office at the cannery and later portrayed as Barnabas' bedroom in 1795. Caleb Collins, the last family member to reside there, left a provision in his will preventing the sale of the property to anyone outside the Collins family for 100 years, which hindered Burke Devlin (Anthony George) from acquiring it in 1967. Subsequently, the warlock Nicholas Blair (Humbert Allen Astredo) took residence at the property.

Blair House, another house associated with the Collins family in the series, is often confused with Seaview. It is described as a three-story wooden shingled beach house in the Dutch Colonial style, featuring a tall gambrel roof covering most of the second and third floors. The house is situated on a steep sandy hill, overlooking the beach, with balconies on the second and third levels, and a large porch on the ground floor. It also includes a spiral staircase leading to its basement. In the series, characters mention Blair House as being taken by Cassandra Blair (Lara Parker)'s brother Nicholas and later leased by him, both members of the Collins family through marriage.

=== Elizabeth Stoddard's Mausoleum ===
While she was masquerading as Cassandra, Angelique placed a curse upon Elizabeth causing her to be obsessed with the notion of being buried alive. Elizabeth had a special tomb constructed with a bell so that if she should happen to be accidentally interred alive (as she was, sure enough), she would be able to summon help.

=== Woods ===
Collinwood estate has a vast wild forest growing on it. Quite naturally, it is the site of numerous encounters with the supernatural — Elizabeth was almost attacked by the werewolf Chris Jennings there, and the headless corpse of Judah Zachery (Michael McGuire) attacked and killed Hortense Smiley (Jenny Egan), a servant woman in 1840.

=== Widow's Hill ===
Although not officially a part of the estate, Widow's Hill is adjacent to it. The name of this striking cliff overlooking the ocean comes from the fact that widows of sailors lost at sea would congregate there to mourn their departed husbands. Their ghosts haunted the hilltop and were known as "The Wailing Women." Josette famously leaped to her death there, and Jeb Hawkes also died from a fall there (as did, supposedly, Victoria Winters, after being driven mad by the Leviathans, but this was related second-hand and not actually shown on-screen).

== Television and film locations ==
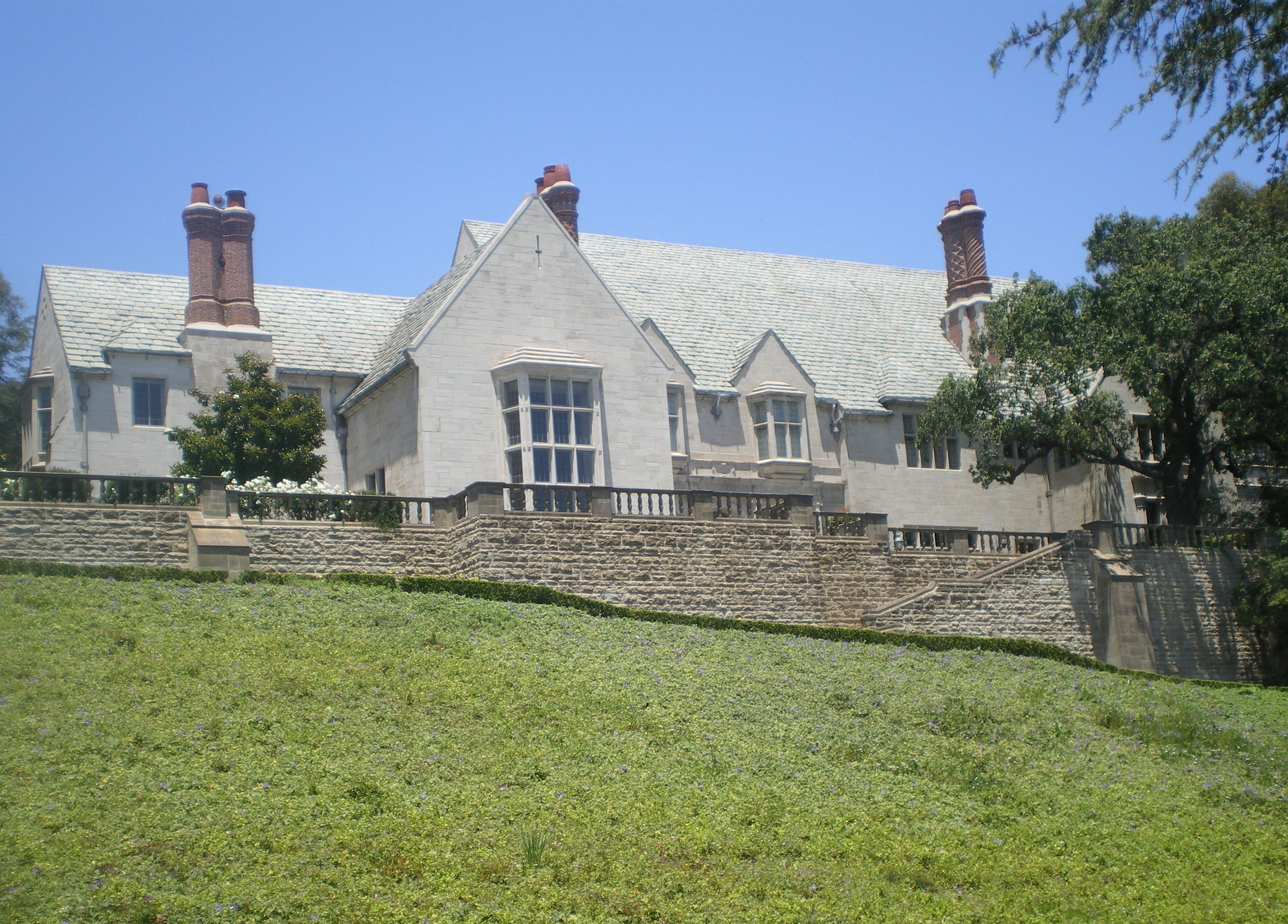
Greystone Mansion in Beverly Hills was used as Collinwood in the 1991 revival series and The WB's 2004 pilot.

The 1966–1971 series Dark Shadows used the exteriors of Seaview Terrace in Newport, Rhode Island, later known as Carey Mansion, as Collinwood. Lyndhurst Mansion in Tarrytown, New York was used for the films House of Dark Shadows (1970) and Night of Dark Shadows (1971). Some interior scenes of House of Dark Shadows were shot at the Lockwood–Mathews Mansion in Norwalk, Connecticut. Greystone Mansion in Beverly Hills, California was used as Collinwood in the 1991 revival series and The WB's 2004 pilot.

== See also ==
- Dark Shadows
- House of Dark Shadows
- Night of Dark Shadows
