= Julia Hoffman =

- Dark Shadows character
- Grayson Hall portrays Julia (1968).
- Portrayed by: Grayson Hall (1967–1971); Barbara Steele (1991); Kelly Hu (2004); Helena Bonham Carter (2012)
- Duration: 1967-1971, 2004, 2012
- First appearance: June 30, 1967
- Last appearance: April 2, 1971
- Created by: Dan Curtis
In-universe information
- Occupation: Doctor

Julia Hoffman is a fictional character played by Grayson Hall in the 1966 ABC soap opera Dark Shadows. A self-serving and conniving doctor in the fields of psychology and rare blood disorders, she is also head of the Windcliff Sanitarium, who moved into Collinwood and discovered the vampire Barnabas Collins (Jonathan Frid). Initially, Julia represented a threat to Barnabas' undead existence, but eventually, she became one of his most staunch allies. Together, Julia and Barnabas worked to assist the Collins family in the past, present, future, and in Parallel Time.

First brought onto the show to be as a type of Van Helsing character focused on destroying the vampire. Instead, as the storyline developed, Dr. Hoffman fell in love with Barnabas, bringing a twist of tension to the narrative.

In addition to her role as a character who investigated and later helped Barnabas, Dr. Julia Hoffman also functioned to slow down the storytelling and build in elaboration. “One of her signature lines, spoken in tentative, leading tones was “You mean...,” thus allowing another character to restate a bit more of the story and flesh out each episode.”

== 1966-1971: Dark Shadows ==
=== 1967-1971 ===
Julia Hoffman (Grayson Hall) was introduced as the head of Windcliff Sanitarium after Maggie Evans (Kathryn Leigh Scott) was admitted after escaping from the vampire Barnabas Collins (Jonathan Frid), who had wished to transform Maggie into a mental replica of his long-dead love Josette du Pres (also played by Scott). In order to protect herself from the trauma Maggie had mentally regressed to childhood, playing with a doll given her by the ghost of Sarah Collins (Sharon Smyth) and singing "London Bridge". So as to protect Maggie from her unknown kidnapper, authorities falsely stated that Maggie had died shortly after admission to hospital without saying anything, on the grounds that her attacker would presumably seek her out again if she were known to be alive. Only Julia, Maggie's father Sam (David Ford), her boyfriend Joe Haskell (Joel Crothers), Collinsport physician Dr. Dave Woodard (Richard Woods), and Windcliff staff were aware that Maggie was alive. Both Sam and Joe were desperate to see Maggie, but Julia wanted to work with Maggie without their distractions. Julia allowed both Sam and Joe to visit Maggie, hoping that seeing her in the condition she was would make them not want to see her for a while; as she had predicted, both men were shaken by Maggie's mental instability and agreed not to visit again.

Julia was recommended to Maggie's case by Dave Woodard (then played by Robert Gerringer), an old friend and colleague of hers, because of Julia's expertise in both psychology and blood disorders. Julia and Dave would constantly disagree on methods of treatment. Dave wanted to show Maggie a sketch drawn by Sam but Julia did not want this. Dave won the argument, and Maggie was able to identify the girl in the picture as Sarah Collins.

Julia was able to get Maggie to remember certain things, including the memory of being in a cemetery, the scent of jasmine, and a musical tinkling sound. By this time Julia clearly had her suspicions of what had happened to her patient, but constantly refused to elaborate to Dave, suggesting he find Maggie a new doctor if he didn't like her methods. Dave declined and objected to Julia wanting to take Maggie back to Collinsport. Julia did take Maggie back to Eagle Hill Cemetery and was spotted by Victoria Winters (Alexandra Moltke), who thought she had seen Maggie's ghost. Maggie was terrified of the Collins Mausoleum and claimed that someone would kill her if she did not leave.

With Dave's help, Julia posed as a historian and arrived at Collinwood to learn more about Maggie's experiences. Julia claimed to be writing a book about famous New England families and spoke with both Victoria and David Collins (David Henesy). Julia was interested in Victoria believing that Sarah was not real. Victoria took Julia to the Old House to meet Barnabas so that he could help Julia with her book, as Barnabas had shown a great deal of knowledge about the Collins family history - nobody was aware that that knowledge was from personal experience, of course. Julia then recounted several names to Maggie, in hopes of gaining a reaction; Maggie was horrified when Julia mentioned Barnabas.

Back at Collinwood, family matriarch Elizabeth Collins Stoddard (Joan Bennett) was initially hesitant when Julia wanted to discuss plans about her book involving the Collins family. Victoria talked with Elizabeth, who reconsidered and invited Julia into living in Collinwood so as to continue her research. Barnabas was also reluctant to cooperate, refusing to share information with Julia. Julia showed a family album to Barnabas, and while he was looking through it, Julia took out a compact mirror to find that Barnabas cast no reflection in it. When Barnabas confronted her about it, Julia claimed she was checking her makeup; she then told Victoria she learned everything she needed to know.

During a storm, Julia studied the Collins family history and questioned Victoria about Josette - Victoria had recently attended a party at the Old House in one of Josette's dresses, unaware that Barnabas was planning to change her into a duplicate of Josette, as he had tried with Maggie. Julia became interested in Josette's music box (the tinkling sound heard by Maggie) and the fact that Barnabas kept one of Josette's old perfume bottles in her room in the Old House - Josette's favorite scent was jasmine. Julia suggested that Barnabas may be attempting to recreate Josette, which offended Victoria. The next day, Julia broke into the Old House and found Barnabas asleep in his coffin. When Dave questioned Julia about her findings, she lied and told him she had found nothing. Barnabas returned to Collinwood to speak with Julia and she offered to work with him, saying that she had information about the original Barnabas and deliberately hinting that she knew his secret. The two agreed to meet again later that evening, and Julia told Barnabas’ portrait that neither could wait that long.

Later that night Barnabas went to Julia's room with the intent to kill her; however, Julia had been expecting this and placed a dummy in her bed. Julia told Barnabas that she had been waiting for him and said that she thought that she knew of a way to cure him of his vampirism.

==== The Cure ====
Julia admitted that she had long been fascinated with the relationship between life and death and wanted Barnabas' help to bridge them. Her plan was that, over a period of time, she would inject new plasma into Barnabas' bloodstream to counteract the destruction of his own blood cells and thus counteract his vampirism. Julia and Barnabas went to the Old House to pick a room in the basement for a laboratory. Barnabas, however, still planned on murdering Julia. As he was about to, Julia revealed that Maggie was still alive and would identify Barnabas as Julia's killer unless Julia stopped the memories from returning. Shortly thereafter Maggie escaped Windcliff and reappeared in Collinsport to everyone's shock; again Barnabas threatened to kill Julia, but she hypnotized Maggie to suppress her memories. Julia told Barnabas that she would continue to do so only if he continued to participate in her experiments.

Julia was wary of Barnabas and Victoria's relationship, attempting to keep the two of them apart. When Victoria became engaged to Burke Devlin (Anthony George), Julia cautioned Barnabas that he not hurt anyone; he now willingly agreed to participate in Julia's experiments, in the hope of winning Victoria as a mortal.

David Collins began to grow suspicious of Barnabas and was closing in on his secret, threatening the experiments. Julia hypnotized David when he broke into the Old House. Dave Woodard (at this point played by Peter Turgeon) then found out that Barnabas was actually the son of the eighteenth century Joshua Collins (Louis Edmonds) and stole Julia's notes from the experiments from her room in Collinwood. Julia confronted Dave and attempted to convince him to keep Barnabas' secret. When Dave refused to cooperate, Julia agreed to help Barnabas murder him. Barnabas injected Dave with a substance which would mimic the appearance of a heart attack. Because of Julia's guilt, she wanted to cancel the experiments but Barnabas refused.

Now completely at the mercy of Barnabas' demands and in love with the reluctant vampire, Julia attempted to remove her rival, Victoria Winters, from the situation. After she told Victoria that Barnabas would rather be left alone, Barnabas demanded that Julia stay out of his personal affairs. Secretly, Julia began planting subconscious fears in Victoria's mind, hypnotizing the family governess and showing her Barnabas in his coffin.

The treatments for Barnabas began to show unusual effects, and Barnabas' hand aged to that of an old man. After a failed attempt to reverse the aging, Barnabas' entire body aged to its true chronological age. Julia volunteered to become Barnabas' victim, hoping that not only could he use her blood to return to his youthful state, but that he would see her sincerity. He declined her offer, attacking Carolyn Stoddard (Nancy Barrett), who had sneaked into the Old House basement and discovered his coffin. The blood from Carolyn returned Barnabas to his normal appearance, and she became his eyes, ears and hands at Collinwood. Barnabas refused to continue the experiments, even though Julia had calculated that her timetable of treatments would deliver more positive results.

Barnabas now began a plan to drive Julia insane by making her believe that Dave Woodard's ghost was haunting her. Hoping the ghost of Sarah Collins would protect her, Julia managed to speak with the spirit of the little girl, who was upset that Julia had aided Barnabas in Woodard's murder. Julia told Barnabas that she had spoken to his sister, who intervened when Barnabas tried to strangle her. The doctor later confirmed that David was telling the truth about Sarah to Elizabeth Collins Stoddard and Victoria Winters, and urged the Collins family to hold a séance to contact the girl's spirit. Julia assisted Roger Collins (Edmonds) in the ritual, during which Victoria disappeared to the year 1795. Like the rest of the members of the séance, Julia was frozen in time when Victoria vanished.

As far as Julia and other séance participants were aware, Victoria suddenly reappeared in an eighteenth-century dress reacting as if she was being strangled (she had travelled back just as she was being hanged for witchcraft). Julia did not allow Roger or Elizabeth to call a doctor, finally admitting that she was actually a doctor and not a historian. While unable to explain Victoria's disappearance and reappearance at the table, she deduced that the marks on her neck were rope burns and that she had also been shot in the arm. Unwilling to expose Barnabas as a vampire and reveal her true motivations for coming to Collinwood, Julia lied to Elizabeth that she had been close to suffering a nervous breakdown in her medical practice and left to write a book about the Collins family as therapy. Although appearing calm to everyone else, Julia enjoyed the fact that Barnabas feared Victoria may have learned his secret in 1795, and that he had no control of the situation. She gloated and refused to let Barnabas in to see Victoria while she rested in her room.

Julia attempted to make herself feel younger by cutting her hair and focused her attention on understanding the extent of Vicki's memories from 1795. She initially refused to reveal anything about her findings to Barnabas, but he convinced her to think about trying the medical cure for his vampirism again. Shortly after, she discovered that Barnabas had attacked Vicki anyway, and threatened to expose him if he harmed the governess further.

==== The Werewolf and Quentin's Ghost ====
Julia was the second person in Collinsport to see Chris Jennings (Don Briscoe) when he returned to Collinsport after a long absence and instantly mistook him for his twin brother Tom (also Briscoe) - a vampire who had attacked and nearly killed her recently, and who had been destroyed. She did not, however, become aware of the presence of a werewolf in the area until after Elizabeth was attacked and Chris came to her with a suspicious request for sleeping pills. After Joe Haskell was attacked and driven insane by seeing Chris as a werewolf, he was sent to Windcliff Sanitarium for treatment, and Julia and Barnabas discovered proof that Chris was a werewolf. They began to hide him away in the old Collins family mausoleum to stop him from harming others during his transformations.

Julia suspected a connection between Quentin Collins (David Selby), the spirit who had possessed David and driven the family out of Collinwood, and Chris Jennings. When Barnabas decided to confront the ghost of Quentin, Julia and Professor Timothy Elliot Stokes (Thayer David) supervised Barnabas' use of I Ching wands. Julia feared for Barnabas when she learned that he had thrown the wands and reached the 49th hexagram, The Hexagram of Change. Barnabas' astral body left his physical body for the year 1897, and Julia and Stokes remained behind in the present.

==== 1897 ====
Julia and Professor Stokes stood guard over Barnabas' body which sat motionless while he was in the I-Ching trance for months. When the body disappeared suddenly, the two feared that Barnabas had died. Julia then found a letter from Barnabas explaining that he would soon die in 1897, and she set out to learn the truth about Quentin's death. She went to the abandoned Collinwood and found the ghost of Beth Chavez (Terry Crawford), who told her that she had murdered Quentin on September 10, 1897.

Worried and hoping to save Barnabas from the fate he mentioned in his letter, Julia conducted an I-Ching ceremony of her own and traveled to 1897. Julia was at first delirious and confused, and she was unable to provide any information to help Barnabas and Quentin, though she later revealed that David had recovered and that the ghosts of Quentin and Beth had disappeared. Julia's arrival prompted Barnabas to secretly plan an elaborate deception that would allow him to fight the evil Count Andreas Petofi (Thayer David) more freely. Julia began treating Barnabas' vampirism with her medical knowledge once more. Petofi kidnapped Julia and forced her to reveal that I-Ching was the secret to time travel. When Barnabas attempted to rescue her, a trap from Petofi's servant Aristede (Michael Stroka) fired a gun at Julia, but the bullet did not harm her, as her real body only existed in 1969. Petofi attempted to poison Julia, but she again survived. Petofi realized that Julia was invulnerable because only her astral body was in 1897 without a physical host body to inhabit - when Barnabas' spirit had travelled to 1897, he had possessed his vampiric body, hence he was physically present in that time. Julia secretly continued treating Barnabas while everyone, including Count Petofi, thought he was staked in his coffin. Without warning Julia began to feel strange, hearing howling wind and Professor Stokes' voice in the present. Realizing that something related to her time travel was affecting her astral body, Julia asked Angelique Bouchard (Lara Parker) to finish the work she had started, and the former enemy agreed. Shortly thereafter Julia disappeared back to 1969.

==== The Leviathan Saga ====
Julia checked the Old House frequently, hoping Barnabas had returned from 1897. Soon after her return, Julia and Carolyn went antique shopping in Collinsport, and Julia bought a landscape painting by Charles Delaware Tate (Roger Davis), who had created a magical portrait of Quentin Collins that had suppressed his lycanthropy; Julia began to wonder if Tate might still be alive and able to paint a portrait of Chris Jennings with similar results. Barnabas returned to the present, but Julia did not know that he had come back via 1796 and under the control of the Leviathans, who planned to retake the Earth. Barnabas said he returned in an I-Ching trance, which seemed to confuse Julia. She became suspicious of the Naga Box and Barnabas' strange, distant behavior as they spoke. Barnabas gave few details about his month in the past after Julia's departure, and when she asked if Barnabas had returned because everything had been resolved, Barnabas said he had returned because he wanted to.

After Barnabas told Chris Jennings that he would be unable to do anything to help with his condition, Julia admitted to Chris that she knew Barnabas was lying about returning to 1969 through the I-Ching because she had locked the Old House basement door from the outside. She reasoned that if Barnabas had returned that way, he would still have been locked in the basement when she arrived. Julia became determined to uncover what was wrong with Barnabas, and sneaked back into the house. She heard strange breathing noises coming from the Naga Box, but had no idea that it was about to unleash terrible danger into 1969.

Julia again questioned Barnabas after he nearly killed a man named Grant Douglas with his car. Julia saw that Grant was identical to Quentin Collins, but Barnabas tried to convince her that he was not actually the man they had known from the past. In fact Grant was the same Quentin from 1897 - the portrait had not only suppressed his werewolf transformations, but aged instead of him, rendering him effectively immortal. When Grant woke up from the accident-induced coma, Julia became convinced that Barnabas had somehow been responsible for his inability to recall anything about his past. Julia worked with Grant Douglas in an attempt to restore his memory, using both hypnosis and the gramophone in Quentin's room at Collinwood, to no avail.

Julia eventually learned that Charles Delaware Tate had died, but soon discovered another painting just like her landscape, only painted by another artist, Harrison Monroe. She began to suspect that Tate might still be alive but using the different name, and this was confirmed when she visited the man in his nearby home in the middle of the night.

Barnabas began a ritual to bring Julia under the control of the Leviathans, as her curiosity had brought her too close to uncovering their goal. Julia was able to resist the urge to open the Naga Box because she had a rare genetic immunity to Leviathan control.

The doctor anguished during the full moon, fearing for both Chris Jennings and Grant Douglas, who she feared was also a werewolf. She was soon relieved to find that Quentin at least had not transformed, indicating that his portrait was still intact somewhere. She found the portrait, also painted over, in the collection of Sky Rumson (Geoffrey Scott), husband of Angelique. Angelique agreed to loan Julia the painting in secret so that the landscape could be removed and transferred to another canvas, as long as Julia did not involve her with the Collins family. Julia would then have the portrait of Quentin, which she was sure would trigger Grant Douglas' memory. Her suspicions proved correct; after she showed it to "Grant", his memories were restored.

Soon afterwards, Julia demanded again that Barnabas explain the situation, which he finally agreed to do - a Leviathan order to kill her had broken their control over him. At the Old House, Barnabas revealed how he had been captured by the Leviathans after following Lady Kitty Hampshire (Kathryn Leigh Scott) from 1897 to 1797. The two also discussed Quentin's portrait, Julia's agreement with Angelique to leave her alone, and Leviathan leader Jeb Hawkes's (Christopher Pennock) plans for Carolyn Stoddard. Shortly after, Julia took a step past her own jealousy and accepted Maggie Evans as an ally when she, too, was able to resist the control of the Leviathans.

Julia participated in a séance to contact Josette's ghost, but she warned Barnabas that, if Josette were truly a prisoner of the Leviathans, she might not be able to appear. After Josette's spirit revealed no knowledge of the Leviathans, Barnabas decided to take action against Jeb and the other members of the cult. Julia worried that Barnabas would be punished for fighting the Leviathans, and when Quentin told her that Barnabas had failed to destroy the Naga Box and had not been killed for trying, she decided that Jeb had probably turned Barnabas back into a vampire.

Julia and Quentin saw Barnabas at the Blue Whale with Nelle Gunston (Elizabeth Eis), a newly arrived member of the Leviathan cult, and his uninterested behavior only added to her worries. Later, Julia discovered Nelle's body, and, upon discovering bite-marks on the neck, realized that Barnabas had indeed become a vampire again. She offered to begin treating Barnabas with injections to cure him, but Barnabas refused to begin right away because he planned to strike a different blow against Jeb. Julia attempted to reach Willie Loomis (John Karlen) so that he could protect Barnabas during the day, and eventually succeeded in getting him to return to Collinsport. She also convinced Barnabas to begin the treatments to cure him again, but after a week of injections, he reported that the fluid appeared to be having no effect on his system. Julia, however, assured him that the treatments would succeed.

Jeb watched through the window of the Old House parlor as Julia treated Barnabas some nights later, realizing what she was doing to help the vampire. Julia discovered that night that Barnabas had killed Megan Todd (Marie Wallace), and the two prepared to drive a stake through her heart before she could rise as a vampire, but Megan woke while Barnabas was getting the stake ready, and she escaped from the Old House. When Julia returned to Collinwood, later, Jeb had his recently resurrected zombies attack and kidnap the doctor. She awoke in the carriage house on the estate, where Leviathan Bruno Hess (Michael Stroka) forced her into Jeb's new transformation room. There, Julia saw Jeb in his true form. She was shocked when he did not kill her, but instead asked her to devise a way of "curing" him of his Leviathan form just as he had seen her attempting to cure Barnabas of his vampirism. Julia was unsure of how to proceed, or if making Jeb human was even possible, but she agreed to begin running tests on him if he agreed to leave Barnabas alone. Jeb soon returned, but was forced to let Julia go.

At the Old House, Julia planned to tell Barnabas what had happened, and he arrived with Maggie and a weak Quentin. After learning that Jeb had buried Quentin alive, Julia refused to help Jeb when he appeared at the Old House moments later. He begged her to help him that night, promising that he would become a changed man.

After Jeb smashed the Naga Box and the Leviathan Altar exploded, Jeb's Leviathan form was also destroyed, freeing him to marry Carolyn as a human. Julia came into the Collinwood drawing room moments after Carolyn and Jeb had said their vows, and she offered her congratulations to the couple. Later, she rushed to the Old House to tell Barnabas what had occurred.

Julia offered to inspect the damage to the carriage house with Elizabeth Collins Stoddard, allowing Barnabas the chance to search the east wing of Collinwood for Megan Todd's coffin. When she returned from the carriage house, Julia was shocked and horrified to hear Barnabas' story of seeing what appeared to be Julia and Elizabeth in a room in the east wing. The doctor investigated the room with Barnabas, but the two witnessed nothing unusual. Julia explained a theory she had heard from Professor Stokes about Parallel Time, suggesting that Barnabas had discovered a warp in time in the east wing. They soon found Megan Todd, but she refused to accept injections to cure her, claiming that she liked her new life. Julia and Barnabas later saw Roger Collins, obviously showing signs of vampire attack, and Julia expressed horror at Barnabas' plans to destroy Megan. Later, she questioned Elizabeth about the east wing, noting that she had realized only that day how little she truly knew about Collinwood, but learned little to help in her investigation of the strange occurrences Barnabas had witnessed.

Julia accompanied Willie Loomis to the east wing to destroy Megan. Willie knocked out Roger Collins, who was guarding the coffin, and Julia treated his injuries while Willie staked Megan.

Julia soon told Barnabas that she had given him the last injection that she could. She explained that Barnabas' system had become immune to her original formula, and that she was using a newly developed treatment for him. His chemistry had reached saturation point, and any further doses could destroy him. The two planned to wait for the sunrise to see if Barnabas had been cured, but he suddenly doubled over in pain. Barnabas claimed that he could tell he had not been cured. Julia helped him to his coffin before the sun rose, and she waited nervously for him to rise the following night. As she stood waiting in front of the cellar door, Julia contemplated the thought that her treatments might have killed Barnabas while he rested; she was relieved when he emerged, albeit with increased bloodlust, from the cellar.

Julia went to the Collinwood caretaker's cottage and examined Sabrina Stuart (Lisa Richards), finding her weak from a vampire attack. She confronted Barnabas, demanding to know why he had attacked Sabrina. Julia believed that her own injections were responsible for the increased need for blood, and worried that, until the effects of her injections wore off, Barnabas was in increased danger of exposure from the concerned people of Collinsport. The doctor wished that a solution to control Barnabas' need could be found so that he would not kill Sabrina, and believed that the two would eventually be able to find a cure for his condition. Moments later, Julia learned that Jeb had been killed, pushed off of Widows' Hill by Sky Rumson. Barnabas sneaked out to confront Sky, and Julia later questioned Barnabas about where he had gone. She admitted that she was not condemning him, but Barnabas never revealed that he had forced Sky to shoot himself in the chest. Panicking because of his insatiable lust for blood, Barnabas rushed to the east wing parlor, hoping to finally enter Parallel Time and potentially be free of his curse. Julia hurried after Barnabas, yelling that she wanted to talk to him, but Barnabas had already transitioned into Parallel Time, and Julia, unable to enter the room, was forced to watch him from the door. Julia pondered with horror that Barnabas could be trapped in the other time band.

==== 1970 Parallel Time ====
During Barnabas' absence, Julia spent time waiting in the parlor, hoping to travel into Parallel Time and join her friend. She voiced her fears, wondering if Barnabas' curse had been discovered, not knowing that Quentin Collins could hear and see her from the other universe. She was seen in the room again when Barnabas and Quentin visited the east wing later. When Julia saw her counterpart talking with the resurrected Angelique Stokes Collins about destroying Barnabas, she worried that he was in danger. Shortly after, Barnabas returned to the normal timeline, but told Julia that he intended to help Maggie Evans Collins in Parallel Time. Although Julia offered to go with him, Barnabas traveled to the parallel band alone once again.

A conversation with Quentin Collins from her own time band inadvertently revealed to the Julia Hoffman of Parallel Time that Barnabas was a vampire. The evil Hoffman prepared to stake Barnabas in his coffin, but Julia arrived in Parallel Time and killed her double at the last moment. Immediately after, Julia was forced to pretend that she was her duplicate in a conversation with Bruno Hess. Although he noted that Julia did not look or sound as Hoffman normally did, Julia was able to explain his questions away. She soon encountered William Loomis, and, although plagued with guilt over the murder of her counterpart, worked with the writer to find out if Hoffman had told Angelique about Barnabas' vampirism. Julia began to pose as her parallel self again, this time dressing as she had, and learned that this Angelique knew nothing about Barnabas' secret.

Julia decided to stay in Parallel Time to help Barnabas, taking the risk of Angelique discovering her true identity. Julia was speaking to Angelique when the witch suddenly felt her energy draining. She told Julia to go to her father Timothy Stokes' home, but Julia did not know where that was, and had to look in the phone book to find it. She went to Stokes' house, and he showed her the body of Roxanne Drew (Donna Wandrey), whom he was using to keep Angelique alive. Stokes told her that he had given the body an injection, and that Angelique should have recovered. He also inadvertently revealed how to destroy Angelique: by killing Roxanne. Julia reported this to Barnabas, and arranged for a time when they could enter Stokes' home and kill Roxanne. Although Barnabas planned to stab Roxanne, he was stopped by the sight of her beauty. Julia told Barnabas that his choice to keep Roxanne alive was wrong, and that Angelique's future wrongdoings were now Barnabas' responsibility. Barnabas had Julia examine Roxanne's body, and she determined that she showed the signs of being near death. Stokes returned, and Julia urged Barnabas to leave. She explained to Stokes that she had come to the house because of a premonition that Angelique was in danger, and he believed her lie. After Quentin was arrested for the murder of Bruno, Julia and Barnabas discussed having missed their only opportunity to destroy Roxanne's body, and that doing so after Quentin's arrest would only serve to hurt him. Barnabas urged Julia to stay with Angelique as much as possible.

Julia spoke to Carolyn Stoddard Loomis, and they agreed that, although Angelique had been responsible for the death of Bruno, that someone else had been to blame for Angelique's own murder. When Carolyn remembered events from the night of Angelique's death and refused to tell Julia, the doctor began to suspect that Carolyn was protecting Will Loomis. Later, Barnabas decided to steal Roxanne's body from Stokes' home to use it against Angelique, hoping that reviving Roxanne would incapacitate his enemy. Citing Julia's experience with bringing Adam to life, Barnabas expected Julia to help. To his surprise, she refused, disagreeing with his plan. When Barnabas returned later with Roxanne's body, however, Julia agreed to help her friend to keep him out of danger.

Julia rushed back to Collinwood when Barnabas began to feel that Will Loomis was in danger, and the doctor burst into the tower room, hoping to save Will. Will, already alarmed by Angelique, jumped from the window to his death. When Julia claimed that Will's spinal cord had been broken, Angelique questioned Julia's apparently sudden medical abilities. Julia played off Angelique's concern, and later began her experiment to bring Roxanne back to life. She used mild electric shock combined with injections, but the procedure seemed to fail at first. After Julia left Barnabas to stay with Roxanne, she temporarily awoke.

Julia was alarmed to learn that Inspector Hamilton (Colin Hamilton), an old friend of Parallel Time's Hoffman, wanted to question her about the deaths at Collinwood. Without any other options, Julia decided to bluff her way through the questions Hamilton would ask her as best she could. During their talk, Julia asked the inspector how his wife Jane was, not realizing that Hoffman had been present for Jane's funeral three years prior. When Hamilton asked Julia to greet him in Hoffman's customary way, Julia was unable to do so, further arousing Hamilton's concern. Later, Julia attempted another shock to Roxanne's body, hoping to revive her. The procedure seemed to fail again, and Julia left, not knowing that Roxanne woke up again after she was gone.

When Angelique met with the escaped Quentin in a cave, Julia spied on them and planned to arrange for Quentin to meet with Barnabas. Angelique, however, discovered that Julia was not from her time band, and prevented the doctor from getting Quentin out of the cave. Julia attempted to convince Angelique that she was the Hoffman of Parallel Time, and Angelique pretended to believe her. The two returned to Collinwood, where Julia treated Barnabas coldly in an effort to further convince Angelique of her false identity. Angelique led Julia to a hidden room beneath the house, claiming that it was the place she would put Quentin, but suddenly revealed that the prison was actually for Julia. The witch attempted hypnosis to discover Barnabas' secret, which Julia resisted, and Angelique then explained that she would live out the rest of her life in the hidden room with no food or water, and with only two candles burning until they went out. When Angelique left, Julia immediately put out one of the candles to conserve light, but found that she needed to light the second candle the following morning. Angelique came back, commenting on the cold of the room, and offering Julia a glass of water for her help, but Julia remained uncooperative. The doctor attempted to grab Angelique and escape, but lost the struggle and remained imprisoned in the room.

After Angelique's eventual defeat, Inspector Hamilton and Barnabas searched for Julia, but the doctor, overcome with weariness, had fallen asleep and did not hear their calls to her. Julia was rescued from the locked room when Roxanne used her psychic powers to locate her. Julia almost immediately went to Inspector Hamilton's office to be deposed, and later returned to Loomis House with Quentin, who had been arrested again and finally cleared of charges. Julia and Barnabas attempted to rescue Quentin's wife Maggie Evans Collins, who had been captured by Timothy Stokes. They reached Angelique's room, and Julia began to smell smoke. Realizing that Collinwood was on fire, they attempted to flee, but found themselves trapped in the room by a wall of flames. Roxanne, unable to enter because of the fire, was separated from the duo as the time warp occurred again and returned Barnabas and Julia to the mainstream timeline.

==== The Destruction of Collinwood ====
Although Julia and Barnabas escaped death in Parallel Time, they soon found that the room in the east wing had not returned them to where they belonged. They had instead traveled forward in their home time band to the year 1995. Collinwood was in ruins, and no sign of the family existed at the estate. They soon encountered housekeeper Mrs. Sarah Johnson (Clarice Blackburn), now an old woman, and learned that David Collins died in 1970. Julia and Barnabas investigated a beach shack, finding Carolyn, also older, but insane from an event in 1970. She refused to answer any questions, prompting Julia to go to the records office in Collinsport for information. She was dismayed to learn that all Collins records had been suspiciously destroyed. She also encountered Professor Stokes, who warned her to leave town. Later, Barnabas and Julia spoke with Victor Flagler (Cliff Cudney), whose wife Jeanne had been killed while visiting the ruins of Collinwood, but learned little to help them understand the disaster which occurred. Julia felt evil around them in their investigation. Upon returning to the mausoleum, they discovered the secret room had been opened, and Carolyn was waiting inside, again warning the two to leave.

At Collinwood, Julia found a dagger on the drawing room desk and suggested that its appearance and the sound of tinkling music in the house was not intended to frighten them away. Julia was almost killed by a falling statue, which she noted was just like Jeanne, and a strange ghostly presence began to make itself known. Mrs. Johnson explained that something happened in the Collinwood playroom, but she was prevented from saying more by Gerard Stiles (James Storm), a ghost in mid-19th century clothing. Later, after they were nearly able to get answers to their questions, Barnabas and Julia found Mrs. Johnson dead. They followed Carolyn back to Collinwood only to discover a secret playroom in the west wing where the same music they had heard before was playing again. In the playroom, both Barnabas and Julia saw two figures disappear before their eyes, but Carolyn denied that anyone else had been in the room.

Julia and Barnabas went to see Professor Stokes, and he agreed to help them learn more about the disaster from 1970. Julia noticed a letter to Stokes stating that Quentin Collins, confined to a sanitarium, had taken a turn for the worse. At the Old House, Julia and Barnabas found Quentin attempting to slash his portrait in the attic. Although he was clearly insane, Quentin led the two back to Collinwood's playroom where they witnessed the ghost of David Collins. Julia and Barnabas saw the ghost of David again, this time dancing with Hallie Stokes (Kathy Cody), a young girl they had never seen before. Julia noted that the dancing of the children was of an old style and unlike how they would have danced in 1970. The following day, Julia was startled awake by Quentin, who seemed to have no memory that Barnabas was a vampire and unable to exist before night. She saw Hallie's ghost again in the window, beckoning her back to Collinwood. Julia followed Hallie's ghost, who led her back to the playroom again. The door slammed, and Julia found herself trapped in the room with the evil spirit of Gerard, who placed her under his power.

Julia returned to the Old House and tried to tell Barnabas about her visit to the playroom, but Gerard's ghost frightened her from the window and prevented her from telling the story. Julia began to disagree with Barnabas, and he noticed that something was unusual about her behavior. When the two found Carolyn dead at Collinwood after writing a list of clues about the house's destruction, Julia followed Gerard's urgings and did not examine the body, which mysteriously disappeared moments later. She suggested to Barnabas that calling the sheriff (Don Crabtree) would do no good, but agreed to go to the police when Gerard nodded his approval behind Barnabas. Julia, Barnabas, and the sheriff later found Carolyn's corpse in the playroom, and Julia refused to leave Carolyn's side when Barnabas decided to ask Stokes to perform an exorcism of the house. Alone, she pleaded with Gerard's ghost to leave the house because of the exorcism, but he mentally intoned instructions for her to reveal Barnabas' secret to the sheriff instead. The following day, Julia asked the sheriff to return just before dusk so that she could help him.

Gerard forced Julia to remain in the Old House drawing room while the sheriff went to dispatch Barnabas in the basement. Barnabas emerged alone some time later, having killed the sheriff, and Julia admitted that she was to blame. Barnabas decided to try and return to 1970 with Julia as soon as possible, and when she suggested that he go back alone, he warmly told her that he would never leave without her. Stokes, Barnabas, and Julia performed a séance to contact Carolyn's spirit, and Julia spoke as Carolyn, but Gerard interrupted the ceremony and killed Stokes. In the confusion, Gerard called Julia back to the playroom and convinced her to stab herself with a dagger. Barnabas intervened and stopped Julia, but Gerard used his powers to make her become ill. Hallie's ghost appeared again and showed the two a hidden door and a mysterious staircase leading out of the room. Barnabas helped Julia move along the stairs, and they soon found themselves back in 1970.

Hallie Stokes confronted the two as they came out of the playroom door, and Julia, fully recovered from Gerard's power, realized that Hallie was alive and not the ghost they had seen in the future. Julia and Barnabas rushed downstairs to inform Elizabeth and Quentin of their discoveries in 1995, but were met with shock and skepticism. Julia recalled that they had left parallel time on August 3, but Quentin informed them that the current date was August 3, and therefore could not account for their week in 1995. Unwilling to accept that they had hallucinated the future events, Julia and Barnabas began to research their information. Julia brought several historical volumes loaned from Elizabeth to the drawing room to aid in the search for biographies of Gerard and Daphne Harridge (Kate Jackson), another ghost Barnabas had encountered in 1995. They went to the graveyard and found the tombstones of both Gerard and Daphne marked with deaths in the year 1841. Julia later questioned Hallie in the drawing room, casually asking her if she was familiar with a place called Rose Cottage. That name had appeared in one of Carolyn's clues from 1995, but was unfamiliar to all those living at Collinwood in 1970.

Julia and Barnabas feared that a lunar eclipse represented "The Night of the Sun and the Moon," another of the clues from the future. Julia attempted to take David and Hallie to the tower room to watch the eclipse with her and Quentin, but found them strangely uninterested. Not long after, Julia felt the presence of Gerard in Collinwood, but claimed that it was not as strong as it had been in 1995. When Barnabas planned to evacuate the house, Julia was sure that Elizabeth would never agree to his plan. Julia indicated that, now that Gerard was at Collinwood, they would soon see the effects of his presence, and could use them as proof of the pending disaster. She also stated that Gerard's ghost had not yet taken complete control of the house, and wondered how long it would be until he did. Quentin soon asked Julia what she had learned about Daphne, and pretended to joke about his future connection to the ghost, not revealing to Julia that he had already encountered the spirit. Exasperated, Julia wished that everyone would believe her and Barnabas' fears. When Barnabas asked Julia if she believed that Quentin knew nothing to help them, she admitted that she did, thinking that Quentin would not wish harm to come to the children in the house. She also noted that the feeling of Gerard's presence had lessened, but that he was still present. When Barnabas suggested a séance, Julia opposed the notion, hoping to avoid bringing further evil into the house.

After Barnabas went to astrologist Sebastian Shaw (Christopher Pennock) in an attempt to convince him to complete Carolyn's horoscope and prevent yet another of the clues, Julia received a telephone call at Collinwood, interrupting her perusal of 19th century tax records in an effort to locate Rose Cottage. She was shocked to hear the voice of Roxanne Drew on the line, asking for Barnabas. To Julia's surprise, Roxanne stated that she was not the same Roxanne the doctor had known previously. Julia told Barnabas that he could not proceed with this Roxanne as he had with her parallel counterpart, reasoning that everyone was different in Parallel Time. She cited herself as an example of the differences in people across the time bands, but this did not seem to deter Barnabas from pursuing Roxanne. Later, Julia and Professor Stokes met at Collinwood and decided to speak with Sebastian about the imminent disaster. Although Sebastian claimed to know nothing about what was to happen to the Great House, Julia walked in on him playing the piano in the drawing room, instantly recognizing the music she had heard in the playroom in 1995. She confronted Sebastian on his knowing more than he had told, and he hastily left the house.

==== 1840 ====
The stairway into time led Julia back to 1840, where Gerard and Daphne were still alive. She introduced herself to Ben Stokes (Thayer David) - the former servant of Barnabas in the 1790s, now an old man - and explained her situation. While he did not immediately believe her, he eventually assisted in creating a suitable cover story for Julia to be welcomed into the family. Instead of showing up to be introduced at Collinwood, however, Julia went to the Collins mausoleum and released Barnabas from his coffin, hoping that he had joined her via I-Ching. Unfortunately Barnabas had not yet arrived from 1970, and this version of the vampire did not know her or want to help with her plans. She and Ben decided to chain Barnabas in his coffin again, but found that the coffin was gone when they returned to the mausoleum. Julia found herself causing some of the future events she had experienced, as Barnabas attacked Roxanne Drew and planned to make her his bride.

The family at Collinwood soon met Julia, who, using the last name Collins, was able to set up the story that she and her brother Barnabas were the children of the "original" Barnabas Collins. Julia explained to the family that she had been living on a farm in Pennsylvania, and that her brother had written to her and requested that she meet him at Collinwood. When asked why she had not made contact with the family prior to 1840, Julia stated that Barnabas had more of an interest in the family than she did. Gerard immediately suspected something about Julia was out of place. Gabriel Collins (Christopher Pennock) found an earring belonging to the doctor in the upstairs playroom before Julia introduced herself, and Gerard found the matching earring in Julia's room.

Barnabas again attacked Roxanne and left her to die, but Julia moved Roxanne to Josette's room at the Old House. To Ben Stokes' amazement, she gave the girl a blood transfusion, and Roxanne began to recover. Barnabas appeared in the room and prepared to kill Julia, but was stopped when his mind from 1970 took control of his body and Barnabas and Julia were reunited once again. Julia tried to hypnotize Roxanne, but she escaped from her supervision and showed up at Collinwood.

Later, Barnabas sent Julia to confront Daphne before she could come to Collinwood. Julia warned her to leave town, stating that she would soon be offered the position of governess, and that accepting the job would lead to her death. Barnabas then told Julia to travel to the port of Bedford to get information on the witchcraft trials held there in the 17th century. She returned with news that after the beheading of warlock Judah Zachary (Michael McGuire) during the trials, all of the members of the judges' families died mysterious deaths. Julia noted in particular that one of the judges was Amadeus Collins (Louis Edmonds), one of the family's founding members. That night, Leticia Faye (Nancy Barrett), under the power of Zachary's still-living severed head, tricked Julia into falling under its influence as well. Julia began working to reunite the head and its body, and soon after, she had converted the hidden crypt which had once held the body into an underground laboratory to perform the task. With lightning, Julia managed to bring Judah Zachary back to life. Barnabas, concerned about Julia's behavior, soon discovered her secret, and detained her so that she could not go to Judah as his body burned in a fire in the laboratory. When the body was destroyed, Julia was free of the warlock's control.

Julia and Barnabas had to turn their focus immediately back to Roxanne Drew. Julia tried to convince the girl not to marry Lamar Trask (Jerry Lacy), and Roxanne broke off her engagement because of her love for Barnabas. The success was short-lived, however, as Angelique, masquerading as Barnabas's wife, caused the vampire wounds on Roxanne's neck to reopen and kill her. Barnabas and Julia became intent on preventing her from rising as a vampire. When Angelique found Julia's appointment book from 1970, Julia confessed to her that she and Barnabas had come from the future, and that she and Angelique had originally met in the year 1968. Angelique declared that she considered Julia to be an enemy, and said that she would eventually deal with her. As a result, Angelique prevented Julia from staking Roxanne by making her fall asleep for long enough for Roxanne to rise as a vampire. Julia arrived at Roxanne's grave too late and Roxanne attacked her. Angelique took Julia prisoner and held her in an abandoned lighthouse, planning to let her become a vampire as well, but Barnabas rescued Julia before Roxanne could kill her. Julia recovered at Rose Cottage while Randall Drew (Gene Lindsey) destroyed Roxanne by keeping her out of her coffin during the sunrise; when Roxanne died, Julia was released from her power. She went with Randall to open the Old House cellar and release the captive Trask, who had been locked there to prevent him from going to Roxanne during her return. She defended Barnabas' actions in the ordeal, but was unable to prevent Randall from becoming suspicious.

Shortly after, Julia tried to treat Desmond Collins (John Karlen), who was choking with no apparent cause. Suspecting witchcraft, Julia confronted Angelique, but found that she knew nothing of the attack on Desmond. Although she was upset that Julia had escaped captivity in the lighthouse, Angelique agreed to help the doctor by attempting to contact the person who was truly using the black magic on Desmond. Julia didn't believe Angelique's evasions when the spell revealed only to the witch that the person responsible was Judah Zachary. Angelique again threatened to deal with Julia at the first opportunity she had.

Julia learned from Carrie Stokes (Kathy Cody) that Gerard and Trask had taken a journal belonging to Ben Stokes, and she immediately informed Barnabas. This prompted him to ask Angelique for help, and she, unwilling to lose Barnabas, lifted the vampire curse so that he could appear during the day. Gerard came to the Old House and held Julia at gunpoint, but left when he discovered that Barnabas was not a vampire. Julia refused to accept that Angelique had helped Barnabas for free, and was sure that she would eventually have a price.

Professor Stokes arrived by using the stairway into time some time later, and Julia planned to introduce him as a friend from Pennsylvania. She was unable to meet Stokes for his formal introduction at Collinwood that night, however, as the ghost of Roxanne contacted Julia in a dream and attempted to show her where Barnabas, the prisoner of Trask, was being held. Angelique woke Julia from her dream, however, and Julia was forced to go searching with her to the last place she could remember from her dream. Julia and Angelique eventually rescued Barnabas, and he was able to appear in court as Quentin's new legal representation.

Later, Professor Stokes and Julia warned Daphne about Parallel Time when she observed strange visions in the east wing parlor. Julia also treated Desmond for a gunshot wound he received while breaking out of prison with Quentin. Julia soon found the body of Gabriel, who had died in a fall from the roof of Collinwood. She described to Daphne that his neck appeared to have been broken. Gerard suspected that Julia had been helping Quentin and Desmond, but Julia blew off his accusations and pretended to go to bed for the night. She sneaked out of Collinwood to see Quentin and Desmond again, and took a roundabout route to the fishing shack where the escaped prisoners were hiding, but Gerard found them anyway, and prepared to finalize his plans against Quentin.

Julia was unable to help Angelique when Trask shot her, and she admitted to Desmond that she and her friends had come from the future. Desmond believed their story, and went with Julia, Barnabas and Stokes to Quentin's laboratory. Before going up the stairway into time, Julia, voiced her worry that the group could find Collinwood destroyed, as they had left it, when they returned to the future.

==== Final Fate ====
Using the stairway into time, Julia returned to the present (now 1971), with Barnabas and Professor Stokes and was elated to discover that Collinwood was not in ruins. Two hours later, Julia commented on her happiness at wearing the more comfortable clothing of the present day (compared to that of 1840). After finding that the disaster from 1970 had, indeed, been prevented, Julia assured Barnabas that they would never forget anyone they encountered in their time travel adventure. She and Barnabas left the Collinwood drawing room together in what proved to be the final scene set in the present on the series.

==== Post-Show Imaginings ====
In the program it was unwritten (but acted by Grayson Hall) that Julia had romantic feelings for Barnabas which he did not seem to return in kind, though he was extremely devoted to her. A TV Guide article written by Dark Shadows head writer Sam Hall (Grayson Hall's husband) revealed the outline the show would've taken had it not been canceled sooner than expected. The outlined plans involved Barnabas, a vampire once again, becoming ill due to his unique relationship with the golem Adam (Robert Rodan). Julia would travel to Singapore to treat Adam and there fall ill herself. Barnabas, well again, would come to her and, at long last, declare his love for her and propose that they marry. After their marriage they would remain in the Far East, far away from the threats Angelique posed to anyone Barnabas loved, and Julia would permanently cure Barnabas of his vampirism.

In the 2003 audio play Return to Collinwood, Julia and Barnabas are reported to be on a spiritual retreat in the mountains around Hong Kong.

== 1970: House of Dark Shadows ==
Grayson Hall reprised her role as Julia in the 1970 film House of Dark Shadows. This version of Julia Hoffman was a general practitioner specializing in the field of hematology and alternative medicine who had taken a sabbatical from her medical profession to spend time collating a comprehensive history of the Collins family, moving into Collinwood to work on her project. She was forced to use her medical expertise to treat several victims of the newly released vampire Barnabas Collins, in the process discovering that a strange, unidentifiable cell had entered the victims' bloodstreams, slowly destroying their platelets. Julia managed to identify Barnabas as the attacker and confronted him, agreeing to treat his condition. However, even as the treatment worked she realized that not only had she fallen in love with the reluctant vampire, but he was intent on courting the Collins family governess Maggie Evans. As a result, she deliberately sabotaged her own serum, which caused Barnabas to rapidly age after she gave him his last injection; in reaction he angrily strangled Julia to death.

== 1991: Dark Shadows ==
Barbara Steele portrayed Julia in the short-lived primetime remake of Dark Shadows. This version of Dr. Hoffman was not a psychologist, but a medical doctor specializing in rare blood disorders who came to Collinwood to treat one of Barnabas Collins (Ben Cross)'s early victims Daphne Collins (Rebecca Staab) and stayed on to treat the vampire. The storylines dealing with her initial treating of Barnabas, his accelerated ageing, and Victoria Winters (Joanna Going)'s time travel were recreated in the new series.

== 2004: Dark Shadows ==
Kelly Hu portrayed Julia in the 2004 WB pilot for Dark Shadows, which was not picked up.

== 2012: Dark Shadows ==
Helena Bonham Carter played Julia in the Tim Burton film remake of Dark Shadows. Here, she is portrayed as a chronic alcoholic. Like in the original drama, she offered to cure Barnabas Collins (Johnny Depp) of his vampirism; unlike the drama, this was merely a ruse so that she could transform herself into a vampire via injections of Barnabas's blood. When Barnabas finds out, he becomes livid and then he drains her blood. Later that night he and Willie Loomis (Jackie Earle Haley) dump her body in the ocean, but a later scene implies that she has in fact transformed into a vampire.

== Audio Dramas ==
On March 30, 2019, Big Finish Productions announced that actress Julie Newmar would be playing Julia in its Bloodlines miniseries of Dark Shadows audio dramas, which was released the following month.
