= Collinsport =

Fictional town in Maine

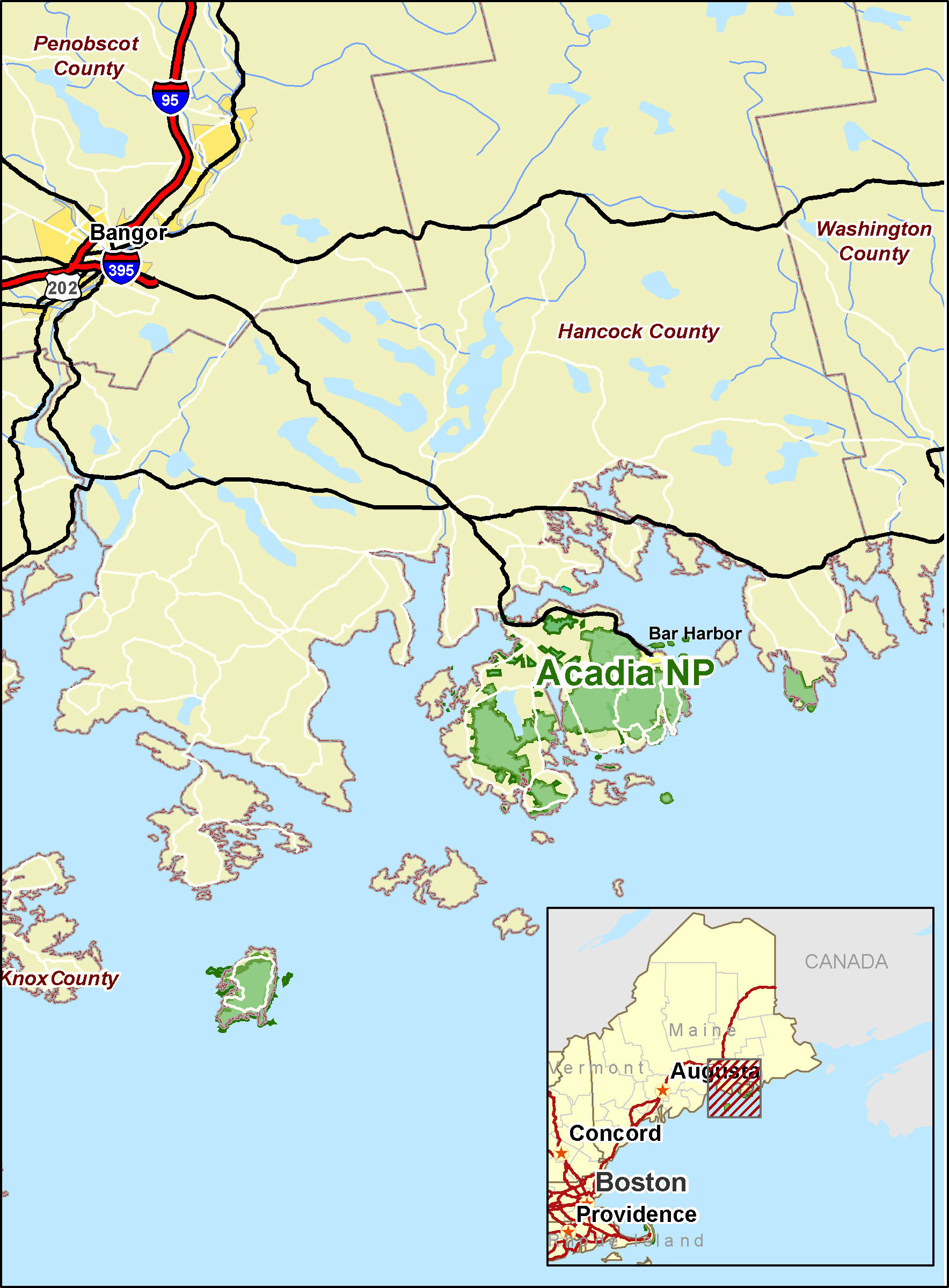
- Collinsport, located north of Frenchman Bay.
- Country: United States
- Geographical region: New England
- State: Maine
- County: Hancock County

Collinsport is the fictional setting of Dark Shadows, the 1960s Dan Curtis Productions Gothic horror soap opera.

== Fictional location ==
In the series, Collinsport is a small, coastal fishing village located in Hancock County in the U.S. state of Maine, on the coast about 50 miles (80 km) southeast of Bangor which would be Bar Harbor area, Mt. Desert Island are where the mansions are. Characters on the show sometimes visit or refer to Bangor or Portland, Maine. The village is, according to the TV documentation, north of Frenchman Bay which would be Mt. Desert Island and near Bucksport, Maine about 40 miles north west. However, this location can not be reconciled with the location of 50 miles southeast of Bangor, Mt. Desert Island is about 50 miles South East of Bangor. Also, the location of the Collinwood Estate is mentioned numerous times as being located on the ocean, not on a river or bay. Bucksport's history and reputation for witchcraft tourism appears to have most directly inspired the fictional Collinsport. The train makes regular runs from Boston, and brought Victoria Winters (Alexandra Moltke) to Collinsport, one stormy night. The local newspaper, The Collinsport Star, is published daily. Population has never been confirmed but is enough to support a cannery and keep the Collins family living in high style. Others speculate that it is Stonington, Deer Isle, Bar Harbor, or Winter Harbor.

== Fictional history ==
Isaac Collins crossed the ocean in a small sailing ship in 1690 and landed in Frenchman Bay. He eventually found a small harbor nearby and started building what would become the town of Collinsport. The town prospered throughout the 18th and 19th centuries, but suffered greatly during the Great Depression of the 1930s. Only the influx of summer visitors and artists during the 1950s and 1960s kept the town from going under completely. Recently the local fishing fleet has been hurt badly by the over-fishing of the Grand Banks.

== Fixtures ==
=== The Collinsport Inn ===
The Collinsport Inn is a three-story inn located on the main street in downtown Collinsport. It is well liked and used by both tourists and locals alike. There is also a small café downstairs off the lobby. It is probably based on the Jed Prouty Tavern and Inn in Bucksport, Maine, but exterior footage was filmed at The Griswold Inn in Essex, Connecticut.

=== The Blue Whale ===
The Blue Whale is a tavern in Collinsport. It was a very popular hang-out for most of the town's citizens. It also has a reputation for some of the very best seafood in the area, and is located right on the water. It is based on the Black Pearl Restaurant in downtown Newport, Rhode Island.

=== Braithwaite & Sons ===
Braithwaite & Sons are the local jewelers and silversmiths. They have been in business for well over 100 years, and have filled many custom orders for the Collins family during that time. One of the more notable family members was Ezra Braithwaite (Abe Vigoda). Ezra began working in the family business as a young man (played by Edward Marshall) sometime shortly before 1897. Ezra actually died in the Collinwood drawing room in 1969 on a business visit.

=== Brewster's ===
Brewster's is a local department store. Another long-standing name in the community, the Brewster surname has been mentioned as long ago as the 1840s, no doubt an ancestor of the current family.

=== Collins General Store ===
Nestled in the heart of the village, the cool, high-ceilinged store is recessed from the street with an office on one end, and adjoining warehouses. The Collins General Store is known for its wide variety of wares — notably its bulk supply of pickles and cheeses.

=== Collinsport Hospital ===
While not as large as a major New York City hospital, Collinsport can certainly hold its own as far as patient care and medical technology with the generous donations of the Collins family and, progressive doctors, such as David Woodard (played by Richard Woods, Robert Gerringer and Peter Turgeon) and Eric Lang (Addison Powell) as well as Cyrus Longworth (Christopher Pennock) in Parallel Time.

=== Cranshaw House ===
This was a large, Gothic estate built upon the beach near Widow's Hill. It is located a very short distance away from the equally impressive Collinwood estate and a small footpath existed connecting the two properties together. A mariner named Captain Cranshaw built the house some time in the 1800s. (Note: This relates to continuity established by the Marilyn Ross novels.)

=== The Eagle (1795) ===
A tavern in the village of Collinsport in the late 18th century.

=== The Eagle (1970 Parallel Time) ===
The Eagle is a tavern in Collinsport, but in parallel time, which runs concurrent to our own. In our time line it is known as The Blue Whale. This alternate reality Blue Whale appears exactly as our own, only the name has changed.

=== Eagle Hill Cemetery ===
Eagle Hill Cemetery is one of the larger graveyards to be found in the town. For the past two centuries, the esteemed Collins family had virtually all of their loved ones laid to rest at Eagle Hill. The cemetery’s most infamous landmark was the Collins family mausoleum. It is here that the vampire Barnabas Collins (Jonathan Frid) was entombed in a secret room at the rear of the mausoleum. The room is accessible by pulling the ring in the lion's mouth over the center grave plaque, which opens the panel to enter the room. This room was originally used to covertly store weapons and ammunition during the Revolutionary War. Sleepy Hollow Cemetery just outside Tarrytown, New York was used in the movies.

=== The Beach Road ===
The Beach Road is a small highway that passes through the village. It is thought to be the local part of U.S. 1, or Maine state highway 33.

=== Lookout Point ===
A beach located between Collinwood and the Collinsport Cannery. A little too rocky for sunbathing, it is usually used for a relaxing stroll along the water's edge, or a short-cut on foot to the cannery. In 1966, tragedy struck when the body of Bill Malloy (Frank Schofield), the well-liked manager of the Collins' fishing fleet, was found in the water, up the coast a short distance from here. Sheriff George Patterson (Dana Elcar) later determined that he had been killed at Lookout Point.

=== Loomis House ===
The Loomis House is what the Old House is called in the alternate reality world of Parallel Time. In Parallel Time, writer William H. Loomis (John Karlen) is married to Carolyn Stoddard (Nancy Barrett). They were given the Old House on the Collins estate, and the residence has since become known as "Loomis House".

=== Rose Cottage ===
Rose Cottage was a house near the Collinwood estate. It was the home of Flora Collins (Joan Bennett), Desmond Collins (John Karlen), Gerard Stiles (James Storm), and Leticia Faye (Nancy Barrett) in 1840.

=== Saint Eustace Island ===
Saint Eustace Island is a small, fog-enshrouded island located off of the North Cove near Widows' Hill. Upon the island was an ancient castle, which contained the ruins of an abandoned chapel. The land surrounding the castle is difficult to traverse and consists of dense thickets, slippery embankments and heavy marshlands. (Note: This factoid only relates to the House of Dark Shadows movie version locale.) This is the Lockwood-Matthews Mansion in South Norwalk, Connecticut.

=== The Todds' Antique Shop ===
It was the dream of Philip (Christopher Bernau) and Megan Todd (Marie Wallace) to one day open their own antique shop. In December 1969, they did just that and opened their business here in Collinsport. Carolyn Stoddard discovered the store and took an interest in it early on and voluntarily worked part-time at the shop for a while. Finding and buying their treasures from area estates and auctions was a short-lived endeavor for the Todds however. The antique shop burned to the ground in mid-February 1970, one in a string of "unfortunate events" that also took the lives of Philip and Megan shortly thereafter.

=== Weatherby Farm ===
A property bordering the Collinwood estate to the south, owned by Mordecai Grimes (Thayer David) in the early 19th century (circa 1840). The Collins' had been trying to acquire this property for quite some time, but Mordecai always declined to sell. He didn't want to give up the land his father had left to him. One day his cattle broke through the fences between the farm and the Collins property. A week later, all his cattle were dead. Mordecai accused Quentin Collins (David Selby) of killing them with witchcraft.

=== Widow's Hill ===
Widows' Hill is a high elevation point outside of the village and the location of the Collinwood estate. It was one 100 feet (30 m) from the edge of the cliff to the water below, and on a cloudless day, one could see 20 miles (32 km) out to sea from the cliff along the water. Widows' Hill acquired its name because women used to wait on the cliff and look out to sea, watching for their ill-fated husbands' ships to return. When Jeremiah Collins (Anthony George) decided to build Collinwood on the hill in 1796, he turned the widows away and told them to go home and keep their grief to themselves.

Some people in Collinsport claimed that the widows still walked the hill 150 years later as ghosts. The wailing sounds coming from the hill were believed to be the sobbing widows, rather than the wind, and some old-timers in town claimed to have seen them walking the hill from a distance.

By 1967, three people had thrown themselves off the cliff. Josette du Pres Collins (Kathryn Leigh Scott) jumped to her death because she was being pursued by her "lover" Barnabas Collins and would rather die than welcome his attentions, and the two others were Collinwood governesses. Legend told of a third governess who would one day be found dead at the bottom of the cliff. Some have speculated that this is Cadillac Mountain in Acadia National Park, just outside Bar Harbor, Maine. Others believe this is nearby Thunder Hole.

=== Windcliff Sanitarium ===
Although not located in Collinsport, the Windcliff Sanitarium should be mentioned here due to its ties to the community. Windcliff is actually located about 100 miles (160 km) away. Dr. Julia Hoffman (Grayson Hall), a psychiatrist and blood specialist, is Chief of Staff. Several of the Collins' family and friends have spent some time here after experiencing various "traumatic events".

=== Collinwood Mansion ===
Collinwood Mansion is a gloomy forty-room mansion located near Widows' Hill. The house was built in 1795 by Joshua Collins (Louis Edmonds). By 1897, it was connected to the electricity grid. The east wing of Collinwood was closed off around 1916 and most of the house fell into disuse. Elizabeth Collins Stoddard (Joan Bennett) successfully petitioned to have the property tax reduced due to most of the house being closed. The house was more of a liability than an asset and by 1967 it was only Collins-owned property without a mortgage. The road leading up to Collinwood from town is steep, with many turns. Several people have died going down the hill in bad weather. Collinwood is reputed to be haunted by Josette Collins as well as several other members of the ancient Collins Family.

Several actual mansions were used for Collinwood. The Carey Mansion (Seaview Terrace) in Newport, Rhode Island, now part of the Salve Regina University campus, was used for the original series. The Lyndhurst estate in Tarrytown, New York was used for the films House of Dark Shadows and Night of Dark Shadows. In the 1991 NBC revival, Greystone Mansion in Beverly Hills was utilized, with nearby Griffith Park as the forest surrounding Collinwood.

=== The Old House ===
The Old House was once the provincial mansion of the Collins family up until 1796. Located on the Collins estate near Widows' Hill, it was formerly known as Collinwood. Joshua Collins was the patriarch of the last generation of Collins family members to be raised there. In 1796, construction was completed on a larger family home on the same property and this first known as the Great House. Later, it would come to be known as Collinwood. When it was first built, the original family mansion began to be referred to as the Old House. With the passing of generations, this off-hand phrase became the official nomenclature for the regal estate.

The filming location was the former Spratt Mansion on the Lyndhurst estate, destroyed by fire in 1969. Originally built in the 1850s, it was acquired by Russell Hopkins in 1907. Called "Veruselle", it was better known as The Colonnades.

== Television and film locations ==
- Carey Mansion — Newport, Rhode Island
- Lyndhurst estate — Tarrytown, New York
- Lockwood–Mathews Mansion — Norwalk, Connecticut
