= Andrew Collins (actor) =

British actor

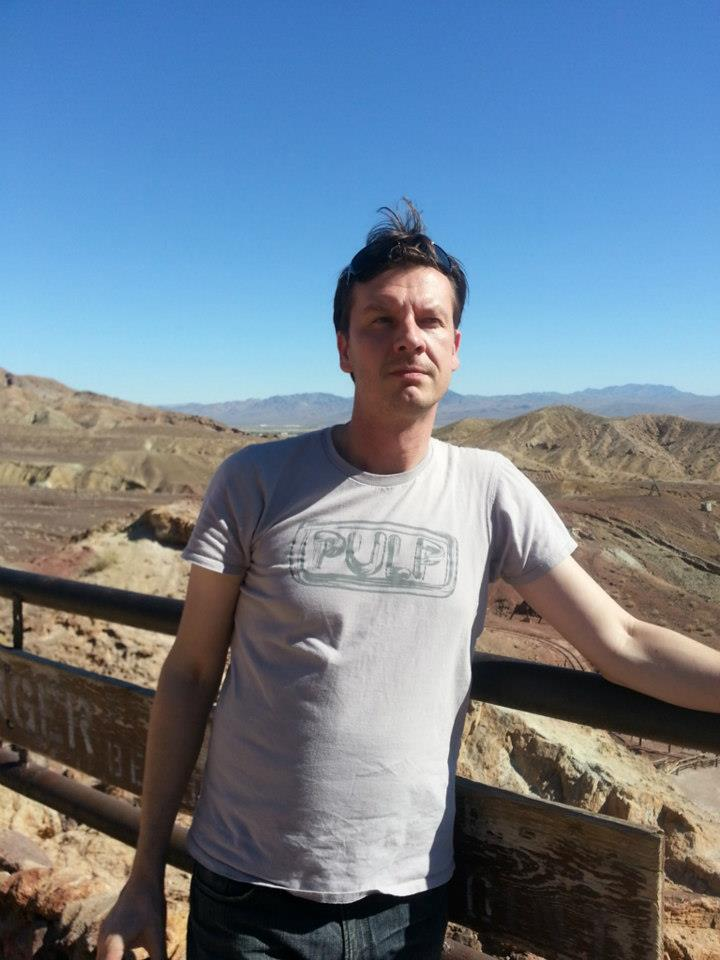
- Born: West Midlands, United Kingdom
- Occupations: Television, soap opera actor

Andrew Collins is a British actor, best known for playing recurring character Jarrett Maxwell in the CBS soap opera The Bold and the Beautiful as well as appearing in Parenthood, The Newsroom and Gilmore Girls.

He is a regular performer in Big Finish Productions, where he stars as Barnabas Collins in the Dark Shadows audio dramas, various characters in Doctor Who, Gallifrey, Earthsearch, and Stargate SG-1.

In the UK, his stage name is Andy Coleman.

== Personal life ==
Collins was born in the West Midlands, England and moved to America in the early 2000s. He is currently living in LA, and is married with two children.

== Career ==
Andrew Collins graduated from Guildford School of Acting and has worked extensively in theatre, film and television both in the United States and the United Kingdom. He was the star of a Spanish national commercial, as well as several commercials for the UK, and also works as a voice-over artist.

Collins currently plays Jarrett Maxwell on the CBS soap opera The Bold and the Beautiful and has been seen on The Newsroom, Parenthood, Gilmore Girls, Passions, The Young and the Restless, All My Children and the BBC’s Dangerfield, among others. He is a regular performer for Big Finish audio dramas, has played characters in Doctor Who, Gallifrey, Earthsearch, and Dark Shadows, from which he has earned a large following as the new incarnation of Barnabas Collins.

As a writer/performer he was a leading light of the cult London satire show, Newsrevue, as well as several other shows including The Smiling Assassins and Lounge Lizards in Love.

== Film, television and audio credits ==
Television series
Year	Title	Role	Notes
2014	The Newsroom	Floor Manager	Episode: "What Kind Of Day Has It Been"
2014	Parenthood	Al	Episode: "Cold Feet"
2004 - current	The Bold and the Beautiful	Jarrett Maxwell	Recurring
2009	Crafty	Aaron Neville	Episode: "Pilot"
2003	Gilmore Girls	Photographer	Episode: "Dear Emily and Richard #1.1"
2003	Passions	Co-star	4 Episodes
2003	General Hospital	Co-star	
2002/2004	The Young and the Restless	Co-star	
2001	All My Children	Co-star	
1998	Dangerfield	Co-star	

Films
Year	Title	Role	Type
2010	The Lempke Brothers	Newscaster	Film
2008	Anniversary	Lead	Film
2008	The Proposal	Lead	Film
2008	Bedtime Stories	Young Mr. Dixon	Film

Audio Drama / Radio
Year	Title	Role	Notes
2006–Present	Dark Shadows	Barnabas Collins	Audio Drama
2012	Stargate SG-1	Keto	Audio Drama
2006	Earthsearch Mindwarp		Radio Series
2004-2014	Gallifrey	Andred	Audio Drama
2002	Dr. Who: The Church & The Crown	Francois Rouffet	Audio Drama
2000	Dr. Who: Winter For The Adept	Spaceship Commander	Audio Drama
2000	Dr. Who: The Fires of Vulcan	Popidius Celsinus	Audio Drama
