= Angelique Bouchard Collins =

Fictional character in Dark Shadows

Angelique Bouchard
- Dark Shadows character
- Portrayed by: Lara Parker (TV series); Lysette Anthony (1991); Eva Green (film 2012)
- First appearance: 22 November 1967
- Last appearance: 2 April 1971
- Created by: Dan Curtis and Art Wallace
In-universe information
- Other names: Cassandra Blair Collins (1968); Angelique Rumson (1970); Valerie Collins (1840); Miranda DuVal (1692)
- Family: 1795: Andre du Pres (father); Cymbaline Bouchard (mother); Theodore Bouchard (adoptive father); Josette du Pres (half-sister); Natalie du Pres (aunt); 1970 parallel time: Timothy Stokes (stepfather); Alexis Stokes (twin sister)
- Spouse: 1795: Barnabas Collins (1795); Present day: Roger Collins (1968); Schuyler Rumson (1969–1970); 1970 parallel time: Quentin Collins (until 1969)
- Children: 1970 parallel time: Daniel Collins
- Stepchildren: Present day: David Collins (1968)

Angelique Bouchard is a fictional character from the Gothic horror-soap opera Dark Shadows. She is primarily portrayed as a powerful witch, who is driven by her vacillating love and hatred for Barnabas Collins.

In the original TV series, the character was portrayed by Lara Parker, and appeared within several storylines of the series which aired from June 1966 through April 1971. Angelique was originally introduced to explain how Barnabas Collins became a vampire, but she proved popular enough in her own right to make many return appearances. She is portrayed by English actress Lysette Anthony in the 1991 revival TV series, and French actress Eva Green in the 2012 feature film directed by Tim Burton.

== Original history ==
Angélique (Lara Parker) was born as Miranda DuVal during the 17th century in the West Indies of Martinique. During her early teen years, Angélique travelled to America, where she became a faithful and loyal follower of a warlock named Judah Zachary (Michael McGuire). Judah took Angélique under his wing, and taught her the sacred arts of magic and witchcraft. One year later, both Angélique and Judah were captured and exposed as witches by the Catholic Church. Fearing her fate of death, Angélique betrayed Judah by testifying against him in exchange for her freedom.

Miranda was later reincarnated as Angélique Bouchard. She was raised by Theodore Bouchard, who she believed to be her father, before coming to work for the duPres family. As Countess Natalie duPres (Grayson Hall)'s servant, she followed her to Collinsport, Maine. However, after having a brief affair with Barnabas Collins (Jonathan Frid), Angélique was heartbroken after Barnabas declared his love to another woman - Josette du Prés (Kathryn Leigh Scott). After countless failed attempts to rekindling her romance with Barnabas, Angélique hexed a powerful spell to manipulate Josette’s love for Jeremiah Collins (Anthony George), Barnabas’ uncle. After Josette eloped with Jeremiah, Angelique coerced Barnabas into marrying her. However, after the discovery of her practices in witchcraft, Barnabas supposedly murdered Angélique. Before her "death", Angélique cursed Barnabas as a species of the undead and fell into a coma where she was presumed to die. Later, after her surprising survival, Angélique was devastated about what she did to Barnabas, and tried to reverse her spell. She is the first victim of her own curse, being in love with Barnabas. He strangles her in the secret room of the mausoleum. Her soul is claimed by The Dark Lord in exchange for letting Barnabas continue existing as a vampire through her curse rather than perish.

During the early spring of 1968, Angélique changed her name to Cassandra Blair, and became the second wife of Roger Collins (Louis Edmonds). Roger introduced his new bride to his family. She received a lukewarm welcome and Barnabas (who immediately recognized his former estranged wife) never doubted her true identity. Later, throughout the first year of their marriage, the happily married couple grow further and further apart. As Roger begins to realize his mistake in marrying "Cassandra", Angélique has affairs with multiple men - most notably Tony Peterson (Jerry Lacy) - of whom Roger's sister Elizabeth Collins Stoddard (Joan Bennett) finds in the middle of one such affair and threaten to tell Roger. However, before having the chance to expose "Cassandra", Angélique hexes Elizabeth with a spell that surrenders her into a deathlike state. Believing her to be dead, the Collins family unknowingly buries Elizabeth alive.

Angélique is destroyed by the ghost of Reverend Gregory Trask (Lacy), but is brought back from the dead and cursed as a vampire by Nicolas Blair (Humbert Allen Astredo). She attacks Joe Haskell (Joel Crothers) on orders from Nicolas, and turns him into her slave. Then when Nicolas tells her she can have Barnabas, she no longer wants Joe and quits summoning him. She then turns on Barnabas and she bites him several times and turns him into her slave.

Angélique traveled back to 1897 in order to further torment a time-traveling Barnabas. Initially a villain once more, she falls in love with Quentin Collins (David Selby), and eventually becomes a firm ally in the enduring war against Andreas Petofi (Thayer David).

Angélique's next storyline comes when she is discovered retired from witchcraft in 1970. After her marriage to Schuyler "Sky" Rumson (Geoffrey Scott), Angélique desired to live a normal life by renouncing her powers. After her encounter with Julia Hoffman (Hall), she claimed not be interested in the Collins family any longer. However, after the rise of the Leviathans, Barnabas sought her assistance and begged her for help. Though hesitant to practice magic again, Angélique reluctantly agreed. After the discovery of Sky's allegiance to the Leviathans, Angélique abandoned her husband and took refuge in Collinsport at The Old House.

A post-1795 Angélique is encountered in 1840 by Barnabas during his final TV storyline, where she has no knowledge of future events. Initially once more an antagonist, she eventually aids Barnabas against the threat of Judah Zachary and Lamar Trask (Lacy), losing her powers in the process. Mortally wounded, she dies in Barnabas' arms, moments before he declares his love for her.

== Books ==
In 1998, Lara Parker made her writing debut with the novel Angelique's Descent, which focused on Angélique's early years in Martinique and her love affair with Barnabas Collins.

In 2006, Parker released a sequel, The Salem Branch. She also wrote the introduction to the novel Dark Shadows: Dreams of the Dark (1999), written by Stephen Mark Rainey and Elizabeth Massie.

Parker released Wolf Moon Rising in 2013 and noted there would be a fourth book in the series that focuses on Victoria Winters coming back to Collinwood after her return to 1796. That novel, Heiress of Collinwood, was released in 2016.

== 2012 film ==
In the 2012 Dark Shadows film, Angelique Bouchard (portrayed by French actress Eva Green) is an amazingly powerful and resilient witch, and a successful local businesswoman and community symbol. Her interest in Barnabas Collins (Johnny Depp), after he is unwittingly released from her imprisonment, is again inflamed and she immediately seeks him out.

In a single brief childhood scene establishing Angelique's early interest in Barnabas, the young Angelique (played by Raffey Cassidy) is shown with her mother Cymbaline (also played by Green), a servant, departing from Liverpool for "the New World" along with the Collins family. The childhood scene establishes, more intensively than the television series did, Angelique's class-based resentment of the Collins clan's privileges, for she is cautioned by Cymbaline that she must accept her place, servitude, in the social structure of the time and not even gaze freely upon her "betters", including Barnabas. It is later learned that Angelique had caused the fatal accident that claimed Barnabas' parents' Joshua (Ivan Kaye) and Naomi (Susanna Cappellaro)'s lives.
