= Barbara Blackburn (actress) =

American actress

- Occupation: Actress
- Years active: 1982–2011

Barbara Blackburn is an American actress.

== Career ==
A model in the late 1980s, Blackburn played Siobhan Ryan on the American daytime series Ryan's Hope from 1988 to 1989, and then portrayed Carolyn Stoddard on the 1991 primetime series Dark Shadows. From December 8, 1999, to February 27, 2000, she performed a one-woman show called Extreme Girl at the Currican Theatre in New York City. She performed the show again as Barbara Blackburn Tuttle at the Hudson Guild Theatre in Los Angeles from January 8 to January 18, 2009.
