= Ron Sproat =

American dramatist (1932–2009)

Ronald Sproat (2 November 1932 – 6 November 2009 in Manhattan, New York) was an American screenwriter and playwright known for Dark Shadows.

== Biography ==
=== Career ===
Sproat is best known for his work on Dark Shadows, the 1960s ABC Daytime gothic soap opera. Sproat created the vampire character Barnabas Collins portrayed by Jonathan Frid, and turned the low-rated show into a huge national success. Sproat worked on the show from October 1966 through January 1969.

Sproat also worked on several other soap operas, including Never Too Young, a 1965-1966 ABC soap aimed at teenagers, Where the Heart Is, a 1969-1973 CBS family melodrama, and Strange Paradise, a Canadian soap opera that aired in syndication in the United States from 1969 to 1970, as well as Love of Life, The Doctors, and The Secret Storm.

In addition to television writing, Sproat penned the play The Dry Season which was performed in 1954 by The Hamilton College Charlatans. He also wrote for musical theatre including Abie's Island Rose and Back Home: The War Brides Musical, both of which ran off Broadway. Both shows had lyrics by Sproat's longtime partner, Frank Evans, who died in 2016.

=== Education ===
Sproat received his MA from the University of Michigan, and performed undergraduate work at Hamilton College. While at Hamilton College, he won the William Duncan Saunders Award for creative writing. Sproat also attended Yale University, where he earned a MFA. While attending Michigan, Sproat was also the recipient of the Avery Hopwood Award.
