= Robert Rodan =

American actor (1939–2021)

Rodan

Robert Rodan (January 30, 1939 – March 25, 2021), born Robert Berger, was an American actor and real estate broker best known for playing the created monster Adam on the TV soap opera Dark Shadows.

== Career ==
Robert Rodan was born Robert Michael Berger on January 30, 1939, in Newark, New Jersey. He later changed his name to Robert Trimas, to take his stepfather's last name. After graduating from high school, he enrolled at the University of Miami and majored in art. After college, he enlisted in the United States Army, where he was assigned to a special services unit that produced skits, plays, and other forms of live entertainment for troops.

Leaving the army, Rodan intended to find work as a commercial artist. Dark, handsome, and 6 feet 6 inches (1.98 m) tall, so many people approached him on the street to ask if he was an actor that he decided to try his hand at it. He acted in a few plays on the West Coast and had a small role in the 1964 film Goodbye Charlie.

Under the stage name Robert Rodan, he made his debut on Dark Shadows on May 3, 1968. His role as Adam lasted only until the end of 1968, and he left the series rather than play other characters. He made only one more acting appearance, in the 1969 film The Minx.

After leaving acting, Rodan became a real estate broker in Southern California. Rodan was an avid painter, sculptor, sailor, and swimmer. Rodan returned to acting and Dark Shadows in 2007, providing the voice of the new character Oswald Gravenor in the Big Finish Productions audio drama Dark Shadows: The Rage Beneath.

== Death ==
Rodan died of heart failure on March 25, 2021, at his home in Oregon.
