= Dark Shadows (1991 TV series) =

American television series

- Also known as: Dark Shadows: The Revival
- Genre: Soap opera; Gothic horror
- Created by: Dan Curtis
- Starring: Ben Cross; Lysette Anthony; Barbara Blackburn; Jim Fyfe; Joanna Going; Joseph Gordon-Levitt; Veronica Lauren; Ely Pouget; Barbara Steele; Roy Thinnes; Michael T. Weiss; Jean Simmons
- Country of origin: United States
- Original language: English
- No. of episodes: 12

Production
- Running time: 55 minutes
- Production companies: Dan Curtis Productions; MGM Television

Original release
- Network: NBC
- Release: January 13 – March 22, 1991

Dark Shadows (later referred to as Dark Shadows: The Revival) is an American prime time gothic soap opera television series that aired on NBC from January 13 to March 22, 1991. A remake of the 1966–71 ABC daytime gothic soap opera Dark Shadows, the revival was developed by Dan Curtis, creator of the original series.

== Series story line ==
The 1991 Dark Shadows tells a streamlined version of the original storyline – the arrival of governess Victoria Winters at the great estate of Collinwood in Collinsport, Maine; vampire Barnabas Collins being released from his coffin; Dr. Hoffman's attempt to cure Barnabas' vampirism medically; and, finally, Victoria's time travel back to 1790 to witness the events in which the still-human Barnabas is transformed into an undead creature.

== Development and production ==
Having declined several previous inquiries about reviving Dark Shadows, Curtis was contacted by NBC's then-head of programming Brandon Tartikoff in the summer of 1987. The reluctant Curtis was eventually persuaded by Tartikoff, who "wouldn't let up".

Of the revival, Curtis said, "The essential characters and relationships are the same, but the things they do are different. I thought I could rely on those old scripts, but I found that they were full of crazy plots that we couldn't use. So all the incidents are different; we arrive at similar points through a much different route." According to Curtis, he co-wrote and directed the first five episodes himself, "to get it off in the style I wanted." However, Curtis received co-writing credit on only two completed episodes. The revival series was produced by MGM Television, whose parent company had produced the two earlier theatrical films, House of Dark Shadows and Night of Dark Shadows (now owned by Warner Bros. through Turner Entertainment Co.). A majority of the series was filmed at the Greystone Park and Mansion in Beverly Hills, California, and some period wardrobe from the 1988 film Dangerous Liaisons was used.

== Cast ==
=== Main cast members ===
Actor	Role(s)	Time	Episodes												Total
Ben Cross	Barnabas Collins	1991	1	2	3	4	5	6	7	8	9	10	11	12	12
Ben Cross	Barnabas Collins	1790							7	8	9	10	11	12	12
Barbara Blackburn	Carolyn Stoddard	1991	1	2	3		5	6		8	9	10			9
Barbara Blackburn	Millicent Collins	1790							7	8	9	10			9
Jim Fyfe	Willie Loomis	1991	1	2	3	4	5	6	7	8	9		11	12	12
Jim Fyfe	Ben Loomis	1790							7	8	9	10	11	12	12
Joanna Going	Victoria Winters	1991	1	2	3	4	5	6						12	12
Joanna Going	Victoria Winters	1790							7	8	9	10	11	12	12
Joanna Going	Josette Du Prés	1790							7	8	9	10	11		12
Joseph Gordon-Levitt	David Collins	1991	1	2	3	4		6							10
Joseph Gordon-Levitt	Daniel Collins	1790							7	8	9	10		12	10
Veronica Lauren	Sarah Collins	1991	1		3	4		6			9			12	9
Veronica Lauren	Sarah Collins	1790							7	8	9	10		12	9
Ely Pouget	Maggie Evans	1991	1	2		4	5	6		8	9			12	8
Barbara Steele	Dr. Julia Hoffman	1991	1	2	3	4	5	6	7	8	9		11	12	12
Barbara Steele	Countess Natalie Du Prés	1790							7	8	9	10	11		12
Roy Thinnes	Roger Collins	1991	1	2	3	4		6		8	9			12	11
Roy Thinnes	Reverend Trask	1790							7		9	10	11	12	11
Michael T. Weiss	Joe Haskell	1991	1	2	3		5	6		8		10	11		11
Michael T. Weiss	Peter Bradford	1790							7	8	9	10	11	12	11
Jean Simmons	Elizabeth Collins Stoddard	1991	1	2	3	4		6	7	8	9			12	11
Jean Simmons	Naomi Collins	1790							7	8	9	10	11	12	11
Lysette Anthony	Angélique Bouchard	1991				4		6			9		11	12	8
Lysette Anthony	Angélique Bouchard	1790							7	8	9	10	11	12	8

=== Supporting cast members ===
Actor	Role(s)	Time	Episodes												Total
Michael Cavanaugh	Sheriff George Patterson	1991	1	2	3	4		6		8		10			10
Michael Cavanaugh	André Du Prés	1790							7	8	9	10	11		10
Stefan Gierasch	Professor Michael Woodard	1991	1	2	3	4									10
Stefan Gierasch	Joshua Collins	1790							7	8	9	10	11	12	10
Eddie Jones	Sam Evans	1991	1	2			5								6
Eddie Jones	Bailiff Henry Evans	1790									9		11	12	6
Julianna McCarthy	Mrs. Johnson	1991	1	2	3	4	5	6		8	9				12
Julianna McCarthy	Abigail Collins	1790							7	8	9	10	11	12	12
Rebecca Staab	Daphne Collins	1991	1	2	3										3
Steve Fletcher	Deputy Jonathan Harker	1991	1	2		4				8					4
Wayne Tippit	Dr. Hyram Fisher	1991	1												1
Rif Hutton	Paramedic	1991	1												1
Hope North	Gloria	1991	1												1
Michael Buice	Muscles	1991	1												1
J. B. & The Niteshift	Roadhouse Band	1991	1												1
Georg Olden	Gardener	1991	1												1
Basil Langton	Reverend	1991		2											1
Bruce Barbour	Deputy	1991		2											1
Eddie Hailey	Deputy	1991		2											1
Charles Lane	Antique Dealer	1991						6							1
Ellen Wheeler	Phyllis Wicke	1991						6	7	8	9			12	5
Ellen Wheeler	Phyllis Wicke	1790												12	5
Adrian Paul	Jeremiah Collins	1790							7	8	9				3
Laurel Wiley	Girl	1790							7						1
Courtenay McWhinney	Crone	1790							7						1
Apollo Dukakis	Reverend Amos	1790									9	10			2
Shawn Modrell	Ruby Tate	1790										10			1
Richard Burns	Customer	1790										10			1
Robert S. Telford	Innkeeper	1790										10			1
Brendan T. Dillon	Judge Isiah Braithwaite	1790											11	12	2
Dick Valentine	Jury Foreman	1790											11		1
Joanne Dorian	Nurse	1790												12	1
Ralph Drischell	Dr. Roberts	1790												12	1
Donald Wayne	Minister	1790												12	1

== Episodes ==
No.	Title	Directed by	Written by	Original release date	US viewers (millions)
1	"Episode One"	Dan Curtis	Story by : Hall Powell & Bill Taub; Teleplay by : Hall Powell, Bill Taub, Steve Feke & Dan Curtis	January 13, 1991	23.6 (14.6 rating/23 share, #30)
Victoria Winters arrives at Collinwood, a Gothic mansion on a cliff overlooking the ocean near the small Maine seaport town of Collinsport. She is the recently hired governess to troubled 10-year-old David Collins. David's gruff father, Roger, distrusts her, but his mysterious widowed sister Elizabeth is more hospitable. The simple and trouble-making groundskeeper, Willie Loomis, nephew of Collinwood housekeeper Mrs. Johnson, is convinced of an old Collins family legend of buried treasure and breaks into the Collins family crypt, accidentally releasing vampire Barnabas Collins from his tomb. Barnabas introduces himself as a distant relative from England and begins to romance Victoria. At the same time, the town of Collinsport is beset by a series of deadly attacks.
2	"Episode Two"	Dan Curtis	Story by : Hall Powell & Bill Taub; Teleplay by : Hall Powell, Bill Taub, Steve Feke & Dan Curtis	January 14, 1991	21.1 (13.1 rating/21 share, #28)
After being bitten a second time by Barnabas, Daphne Collins dies and rises as a vampire. She tries to attack David, but he runs away, and then later she attacks her boyfriend Joe Haskell, who is bitten and falls under her spell. Professor Michael Woodard enlists Sheriff Patterson and the police to help him stop Daphne before she claims another victim. Meanwhile, Dr. Julia Hoffman discovers Barnabas' secret when he casts no reflection in a mirror. She offers to cure him of his curse. Roger is revealed to be having an affair with local artist and tarot card reader Maggie Evans.
3	"Episode Three"	Dan Curtis	Jon Boorstein	January 14, 1991	21.1 (13.1 rating/21 share, #28)
Dr. Julia Hoffman begins her experiments to cure Barnabas of his vampirism. Meanwhile, Professor Woodard attempts to uncover the identity of the vampire and begins to suspect Barnabas, but Julia will do anything to keep him from finding out. Victoria begins to fall for Barnabas. Barnabas is haunted by guilt over his lost love, Josette. David begins having nightmares about Daphne, Carolyn, and Victoria turning into vampires and attacking him. Later, the ghost of Sarah Collins tells David that a newer evil exists. Joe talks of leaving Collinsport to escape the memories of Daphne.
4	"Episode Four"	Dan Curtis	Sam Hall, Steve Feke & Dan Curtis	January 18, 1991	12.8 (8.2 rating/14 share, #58)
Julia and Sheriff Patterson respond to a call by Professor Woodard and discover that he is now a vampire; they are forced to kill him. The photo evidence Woodard claimed to have is gone. As Julia continues treating Barnabas, he begins to cast reflections and can walk for a limited time in daylight. Sarah Collins appears before Victoria and leads her to Sarah's diary. Meanwhile, an evil apparition of Angelique (a nemesis from the past) begins to manifest at Collinwood. David, under the influence of another person or spirit (maybe Angelique or Laura his mother), creates a voodoo doll with Roger's belongings and hair from his hairbrush. David sets it on fire, and Roger almost dies. Maggie Evans confesses to Victoria that she and Roger are having an affair, and she must be very careful with David due to Laura's feelings about her and Roger. Maggie also tells Vicki that she has special abilities to see things, and she says she saw Vicki stop David and put out the fire.
5	"Episode Five"	Armand Mastroianni	Matthew Hall, Steve Feke & Dan Harris	January 25, 1991	13.8 (8.4 rating/14 share, #60)
After learning of Barnabas' affection for Victoria, a jealous Dr. Hoffman decides to sabotage the progress of the cure. Barnabas' blood cravings return, and he ages rapidly, reflecting his true age of 200 years. Meanwhile, Carolyn resumes her romantic pursuit of Joe, despite his reluctance to move forward. Maggie has another vision of something terrible happening to Carolyn.
6	"Episode Six"	Armand Mastroianni	Jon Boorstein, Steve Feke & Dan Curtis	February 1, 1991	13.0 (8.2 rating/14 share, #65)
Having reverted to his evil self, Barnabas bites Carolyn and puts her under his spell. He persuades her to try to kill Julia. Elizabeth throws a costume party at Collinwood. Barnabas now avoids Victoria in order to protect her. He is bent on seeking revenge against Julia, who soon realizes that Carolyn is targeting her. When confronted, Barnabas tries to kill Julia until an intervention by Sarah prevents him from doing so. At Maggie's suggestion, a séance is held to contact Sarah for answers, but during the event Victoria disappears and another woman appears in her place.
7	"Episode Seven"	Paul Lynch	Jon Boorstein	February 8, 1991	13.4 (8.3 rating/14 share, #68)
Transported to the year 1790, Victoria meets the residents of Collinwood, each of whom strongly resemble the present day residents. Victoria becomes the tutor for Daniel and Sarah Collins. Victoria also meets and makes an ally of Peter Bradford, the Collins foreman, as well as the young Barnabas, who is eagerly awaiting the arrival of his fiancée Josette. But Josette's handmaid, Angelique, is determined to keep Barnabas for herself. Angelique is revealed to be a powerful witch, who makes the simpleton Ben Stokes her slave. Abigail Collins begins to suspect Victoria of witchcraft, so she goes to see Reverend Trask to show him Victoria's dress which Abigail suspects is a symbol of Satan.
8	"Episode Eight"	Paul Lynch	M. M. Shelly Moore, Linda Campanelli & William Gray	February 15, 1991	13.3 (8.0 rating/13 share, #70)
In 1790, a jealous Angelique uses witchcraft to make Josette fall in love with Jeremiah. Meanwhile, Victoria and Josette are stunned by their striking resemblance. When Barnabas learns that Josette and Jeremiah are planning to elope, he purses them and a deadly duel ensues due to Angelique's interference. Abigail only grows more suspicious of Victoria. In the present day, Elizabeth, Julia, and the rest of the family deal with the presence of the ailing Phyllis while trying to find a way to bring Victoria back to the present.
9	"Episode Nine"	Rob Bowman	Matthew Hall	March 1, 1991	11.5 (7.1 rating/12 share, #75)
During Jeremiah's funeral, Josette accuses Barnabas of killing her true love. Abigail enlists the aid of Reverend Trask to have Victoria Winters jailed for witchcraft. Barnabas hires Peter as Victoria's lawyer to defend her. Meanwhile, Angelique uses black magic to resurrect Jeremiah as a zombie under her control to kill Josette. When Barnabas finally discovers that Angelique is the witch responsible for everything going on, he kills her, but not before she curses him with eternal life as a vampire. In the present, the Collins family continues looking after the ailing Phyllis, while Carolyn continues to be under Barnabas' control. Maggie holds another séance to try to find Victoria, but Angelique's spirit arrives and possesses Julia.
10	"Episode Ten"	Rob Bowman	M. M. Shelly Moore & Linda Campanelli	March 8, 1991	12.0 (7.5 rating/14 share, #69)
In 1790, the Collins Family mourns the apparent death of Barnabas as they move into the new Collinwood mansion. Meanwhile, Peter explains Victoria's time travel story to Josette's mother, Natalie, to help Victoria prove her innocence. That same night, Barnabas rises as a vampire and makes Millicent his first victim. Barnabas also makes an attack on a prostitute in the village. As the vampire attacks in Collinsport only increase, fanatical Reverend Trask continues to believe that the incarcerated Victoria is responsible. Victoria tries to persuade Josette to leave Collinsport before something happens to her. In the present day, Joe discovers that Carolyn is under Barnabas' control. When Sheriff Patterson refuses to do anything, Joe plots to take matters into his own hands.
11	"Episode Eleven"	Mark Sobel	William Gray	March 15, 1991	11.4 (7.4 rating/14 share, #69)
Victoria's witchcraft trial begins. Reverend Trask, acting as the prosecutor, plays on the fears of the community and presents testimony from Abigail. Despite Peter's best efforts at a defense, including testimony from Ben that Angelique was the real witch, Angelique's spirit appears in open court and accuses Victoria of being the witch. In the meantime, Josette continues to fall under Barnabas' control as he seeks to make her his vampire bride. Angelique shows Josette what her eternal life with Barnabas would be by giving her visions of her life as a "creature of the night." To escape that fate, Josette commits suicide by jumping off Widows' Hill. In the present day, Joe tries to stake Barnabas in his coffin, but is prevented by Julia, who has been taken over by Angelique's spirit. Joe is stabbed in the back by Julia, who kills him before she is subdued by Willie.
12	"Episode Twelve"	Mark Sobel	M. M. Shelly Moore, Linda Campanelli & Matthew Hall	March 22, 1991	13.2 (8.4 rating/15 share, #64)
In 1790, Barnabas' vampirism is finally discovered when, under Angelique's power, Naomi is lured to the old house. Abigail, who goes looking for the missing Naomi, arrives at the old house and Barnabas kills her. Daniel and Sarah witness Barnabas' attack on Abigail, and they become lost in the woods while attempting to flee. Sarah falls ill and soon dies. Meanwhile, Peter attempts to save Victoria by filing every appeal possible. Victoria realizes that Barnabas is a vampire and that Angelique is responsible for bringing her to 1790 as part of a plan to destroy the Collins family. When Barnabas learns about Victoria's plight, he has Ben Loomis bring Reverend Trask to the old house and forces him to write a letter explaining he was wrong about Victoria Winters. He also gets revenge against Reverend Trask by walling him up alive in the old house. Joshua learns that Barnabas is a vampire. He doesn't have the heart to drive a stake into his son's heart and end his suffering, so he and Ben seal Barnabas in his chain covered coffin. Naomi has lost her mind due to seeing Barnabas again, and Joshua decides she should stay at Collinwood rather than being sent to a facility. In the present, Maggie attempts to perform an exorcism on Julia to expel the spirit of Angelique, who then instead takes possession of Maggie's body and tries to kill the comatose Phyllis. In 1790, Peter tries to help Victoria escape, but he is shot and severely wounded. Just as Victoria is about to be hanged, she is transported back to the present, and Phyllis is transported back to 1790 and hanged in Victoria's place. Victoria now knows all about Barnabas and his secret, and he is aware that Victoria knows about him and what he is capable of doing.

== Ratings and cancellation ==
Dark Shadows premiered as a four-hour miniseries event on January 13 and 14, 1991, and then moved to a regular Friday night schedule. The series debuted to great success, averaging a 22 share for the first three episodes. Due to the onset of the Gulf War, fully televised on all broadcast networks, NBC was often forced to preempt Dark Shadows, causing ratings to decline as the show struggled to maintain its audience.

In addition to the war, some blame the decreasing ratings on the network's promotional focus on the horror and vampire themes rather than the romantic fantasy elements. With the season finale ranked 64th among 83 shows, Dark Shadows was cancelled. NBC received over 7,000 letters of protest from disappointed fans, who also picketed network headquarters in both Los Angeles and New York City.

== Home media releases and rebroadcast ==
The original VHS release from MPI Home Video features an extended pilot episode and extended final episode, and also presents the original one-hour versions of episodes 2 and 3 (for broadcast, NBC combined them into a movie-length version so they could air that and the pilot as a 2-night mini-series to kick off the series premiere), so the home video presentation of episode 3 restores the "I'm Victoria Winters" opening narration that was left out of the movie-length version (the one-hour versions of these two episodes are also the ones that were shown when the series was repeated on the Sci-Fi Channel).

The 2005 DVD release from MGM Home Entertainment, although re-mastered in High Definition, contained alterations to the original image presentation. Firstly, the overall image was cropped from the original full-screen image to a 1.78:1 widescreen ratio. Secondly, after remastering, certain scenes that were shot "day for night" (shot in daylight, but meant to be altered in post-production to look like night-time) were incorrectly left untreated, presenting the problem of a vampire walking around in broad daylight. Also, this release presented the episodes the way they were shown on NBC, meaning episodes 2 and 3 were the "movie length" version and the unaired footage from the MPI release was not included at all (not within the context of the episode or even as a bonus feature).

The deleted film footage from the VHS release can be seen on YouTube.

The DVD version has been re-released in 2009 since that time in different packaging.

Dark Shadows has been shown in reruns on the Sci-Fi Channel and Chiller. Since 2009, the series has been available for viewing online on Hulu. It was removed sometime later.

== See also ==
- List of vampire television series
