= Robert Gerringer =

American actor (1926–1989)

- Born: Robert Geiringer; May 12, 1926; New York City, New York, U.S.
- Died: November 8, 1989 (aged 63); Damariscotta, Maine, U.S.
- Occupation: Actor

Robert Gerringer (born Robert Geiringer; May 12, 1926 – November 8, 1989) was an American character actor perhaps best known as Dr. Dave Woodard in 29 episodes of the soap opera Dark Shadows, a role that he played from May 1967 to September 1967. In early October 1967, Gerringer refused to cross a NABET picket line during a technicians' strike, a strike that his own union AFTRA was in solidarity with. Gerringer was replaced by actor Peter Turgeon for seven episodes and the character was then killed off.

Gerringer was born in New York City, the son of Mary Agnes (née Moran), a teacher, and Arthur Joseph Geiringer, a surgeon. He appeared in the film The Exorcist (1973)and The Way We Were as well as in soap operas including The Guiding Light, Texas, in which he played Houston attorney Striker Bellman; The Doctors where he played Detective Cadman in 1970 and The Edge of Night until that show's 1984 cancellation. In 1989, Gerringer died from a stroke at age 63 in Damariscotta, Maine.

== Filmography ==
| Year | Title | Role | Notes |
|---|---|---|---|
| 1964 | Black Like Me | Ed Saunders | |
| 1968 | A Lovely Way to Die | Connor | |
| 1971 | The Gang That Couldn't Shoot Straight | Commissioner McGrady | |
| 1973 | The Way We Were | Dr. Short | |
| 1973 | The Exorcist | Senator at Party | |
| 1975 | I'll Quit Tomorrow | Phil | |
| 1977 | The Sentinel | Hart | |
| 1978 | King of the Gypsies | | Uncredited |
| 1980 | Hide in Plain Sight | Judge Duval | |
| 1988 | The Beat | Dr. Morningstone | (final film role) |
