= Quentin Collins =

- Dark Shadows character
- David Selby as Quentin Collins
- Portrayed by: David Selby
- First appearance: 16 December 1968
- Last appearance: The Rage Beneath
- Created by: Dan Curtis
- Species: Werewolf
In-universe information
- Other names: Grant Douglas
- Family: Collins
- Spouse: 1840: Samantha Drew (until 1840); Daphne Harridge (1841–1856); 1897: Jenny Collins (until 1897); 1970 parallel time: Angelique Stokes (until 1969); Maggie Evans (1970–)
- Children: 1841: Tad Collins; 1897: Lenore Filmore; Unnamed son; 1970 parallel time: Daniel Collins
- Other relatives: Barnabas Collins; 1840: Daniel Collins (father); Harriet Collins (mother); Gabriel Collins (brother); Theodore Collins (grandfather); Millicent Collins Forbes (aunt); Flora Collins (cousin); Geoffrey Collins (nephew); 1897: Geoffrey Collins (father); Anna Collins (mother); Judith Collins (sister); Edward Collins (brother); Carl Collins (brother); Gabriel Collins (grandfather); Edith Collins (grandmother); Jamison Collins (nephew); Nora Collins (niece); Chris Jennings (great-grandson); Tom Jennings (great-grandson); Amy Jennings (great-granddaughter); 1841 parallel time: Justin Collins (father); Flora Collins (mother); Morgan Collins (brother); Gabriel Collins (brother); Melanie Collins Young (half-sister); Julia Collins (aunt); Powers and abilities: Knowledge of witchcraft and sorcery.; Werewolf physiology gave the potential to transform into a berserk, wolf creature.; Eternal youth, due to magical portrait of him, painted in 1897.; Virtually unkillable due to cursed portrait.; Accelerated healing due to being Werewolf, and the magical effects of portrait.

Quentin Collins is the name of several characters featured in the 1966–1971 ABC cult TV Gothic horror-soap opera Dark Shadows. Variations of the character have been played by actor David Selby.

== Quentin I ==
The first Quentin Collins (David Selby) is actually the third one shown in the TV series. This version of Quentin was first introduced in episode #1109 in a storyline commonly referred to as the "1840 flashback".

In the 1840 storyline, Quentin Collins was one of two brothers living at the Gothic mansion known as Collinwood Mansion in the fictional town of Collinsport, Maine. Born in 1808, as the favorite son of his mentally troubled father Daniel Collins (Louis Edmonds), Quentin was the head of the Collins Family, and stood to inherit the entire family fortune. This position brought him into frequent conflict with his scheming brother, Gabriel (Christopher Pennock). Quentin was married to a woman named Samantha Drew (Virginia Vestoff), with whom he had a son named Tad (David Henesy).

Around 1839, Quentin had an affair with Joanna Mills (Lee Beery). After he broke off with her, he took Tad on an ocean voyage, on which Quentin became close friends with a fellow passenger, Gerard Stiles (James Storm). His wife Samantha eventually discovered the affair and secretly murdered Joanna, making it look as if she had killed herself.

Quentin was interested in the study of witchcraft. He was not part of a coven, but was eventually framed by Gerard, who was possessed by the spirit of the 17th-century warlock Judah Zachery (Michael McGuire) and sentenced to execution. Quentin also fancied himself an amateur inventor and used his knowledge of the occult and supernatural powers to develop a device that he called his "Stairway Through Time". He persistently labored to build his staircase in a cellar room at Collinwood. It was Quentin's belief that ascending the staircase could open a dimensional portal through which individuals could view and even interact with the future. What Quentin never realized, however, was that his staircase also created a divergent parallel reality (This functioned as the genesis for several storylines which took place in parallel universes). Quentin's devotion towards his work gave Gerard the means by which to manipulate and ultimately betray him.

In early 1840, Quentin, Tad, and Gerard had been off at sea for several months. Gerard comes back to Collinwood with the news for Samantha, that her husband and son Tad had been lost at sea.

When Samantha thought that Quentin and Tad were dead, she began spending more and more time with Gerard. Over time, they fell in love, and he asked her to marry. On the day they got married, Quentin returned. He was shocked to discover that his wife had thought him dead, and had married his best friend.

While his wife decided whom she wanted, either him or Gerard; Quentin began having an affair with his son's governess, Daphne Harridge (Kate Jackson), the sister of Quentin's former lover, Joanna Mills.

Gerard meanwhile had fallen prey to the spirit of a disembodied warlock named Judah Zachary. Judah wanted revenge against the entire Collins family for sentencing him to death for witchcraft in the late 17th century. Judah's spirit took possession of Gerard Stiles and used him as a secret weapon against the Collins family. Working alongside a disreputable mortician named Lamar Trask (Jerry Lacy), who was the son of the 1790s witch hunter Reverend Trask (no known first name; also played by Lacy), Gerard convinced the local authorities that Quentin was a Satanist and that he had used his knowledge of the dark arts to murder a young woman named Lorna Bell (Marilyn Joseph), as well as his own brother-in-law, Randall Drew (Gene Lindsey). Quentin was arrested on charges of Witchcraft and murder, and taken to jail. When his ailing father Daniel heard the news concerning Quentin's arrest, he changed his will, leaving the entire Collins family fortune to Gerard.

Quentin was convicted of witchcraft and sentenced to death by beheading. However, with the aid of Valerie Collins, who was secretly the witch Angelique Bouchard in disguise (Lara Parker), and his cousins Desmond (John Karlen) and Barnabas (Jonathan Frid), Quentin escaped being beheaded. At the last minute, Gerard was shot. At the same moment, the head of Judah burned up in front of the judge in the case. With its destruction, Gerard was free from the possession and confessed that Quentin was innocent, admitting that Judah was responsible for all the deaths. After asking Quentin for forgiveness and receiving it, Gerard died in Quentin's arms. Quentin, having been cleared of all charges, eloped with Daphne. The two left Collinsport forever to make a new life for themselves.

== Quentin II ==
Quentin Collins was born in 1870, in Collinsport, Maine, and had three siblings; two brothers, the elder Edward (Louis Edmonds), the younger Carl (John Karlen), and older sister Judith Collins (Joan Bennett). He was the grandson of the matriarch of Collinwood, Edith Collins (Isabella Hoopes). He had loved two children like his own, his niece and nephew, Jamison (Henesy) and Nora (Denise Nickerson). This version of Quentin was the great-nephew of the first Quentin Collins and whose lineage includes several supporting characters peppered throughout the series, including his great-grandchildren Amy (Nickerson), Chris, and Tom Jennings (Don Briscoe).

This Quentin Collins originally appeared in December 1968 as an angry, silent, malevolent spirit haunting a closed-off set of rooms in the generally uninhabited west wing of Collinwood along with the ghost of his lover Beth Chavez (Terrayne Crawford). Quentin's and Beth's spirits befriended the children David Collins (Henesy) and his friend and distant cousin, Amy Jennings. David strongly resembled Jamison Collins, of whom the living Quentin had been particularly fond. Eventually, they took possession of both children and used them to serve their own interests.

In an effort to save his family, the former vampire known as Barnabas Collins used the cosmological principles of the I Ching to communicate with Quentin's ghost, but instead his spirit was sent back in time to the year 1897 (unfortunately for Barnabas, this meant his becoming a vampire once again as such was his physical state during that time period). This series of episodes is commonly referred to as the "1897 flashback."

Like the first Quentin, the second also was secretly involved in the occult and practiced witchcraft. He was a member of a witches' coven headed by his friend Evan Hanley (Humbert Allen Astredo), the Collins family lawyer.

In 1897, Quentin had earned himself a reputation of being the black sheep of the family — due largely in part to his marriage and subsequent abuse of a woman named Jenny (Marie Wallace). Quentin's affair with his brother Edward's wife, Laura (Diana Millay), and his running off to Egypt with Laura resulted in Jenny's going insane. While Quentin was away, Jenny gave birth to twins, a boy (unnamed in the script) and a girl named Lenore. Along with Beth Chavez, Edward and Judith conspired to keep the mad Jenny hidden from the rest of the family by imprisoning her in the tower room at Collinwood. Edward and Judith wanted to keep any knowledge of the babies from their father and the rest of the world. To that end, they gave Jenny's children to a Mrs. Fillmore (Mary Farrell) in Collinsport, who would raise the children as her own. Amy, Chris, and Tom Jennings are descended from the female child, Lenore Fillmore.

When Quentin returned from Egypt in the spring of 1897, his wife was nowhere to be found. He turned his attention to his grandmother Edith, who was ill and near death. Quentin hoped that she would leave the Collins wealth and control of Collinwood to him. When she died, in an attempt to make that hope a reality, Quentin had Jamison steal the will from the lining of Edith's coffin. The will left everything to Edith's favorite, Edward. Quentin was guaranteed only a room at Collinwood for the rest of his life, but given no money. So Quentin went so far as to have Evan get Sandor Rakosi (Thayer David), a local gypsy, to make a fake will.

Quentin was being haunted by the ghost of Edith and thought that Barnabas was plotting against him. Being suspicious of his mysterious cousin "from England" and believing he would try to interfere in his plans, Quentin and Evan performed a black magic ritual asking for help to defeat their enemies. Using the innocence of his young nephew, Jamison, as a focal point, they managed to summon a powerful spirit. The ritual resurrected from Hell the powerful witch Angelique. But because of her own interest in Barnabas, Angelique wouldn't help.

Barnabas stole the fake will and had Sandor, who was under his vampiric control, to change it, leaving everything to Judith. Angelique warned Barnabas about Quentin's being out to destroy him. Quentin had Jamison steal Barnabas's cane, which he then used in a ritual to cause Barnabas great pain. Had Barnabas been mortal instead of a vampire, the ritual would have killed him.

Soon after, Quentin's insane wife, Jenny, escaped from the tower room and stabbed Quentin to death. Quentin possesses the body of Jamison. Barnabas, not wanting to fail at his mission to save the future Collins family from Quentin's ghost, asked Angelique to restore Quentin to life. However, Angelique was jealous of Barnabas' latest love interest, Rachel Drummond (Kathryn Leigh Scott), Jamison and Nora's governess. She turned Quentin into a zombie and had him try to take Rachel back to the grave with him.

Because of Jamison's strange behavior of acting like Quentin, Edward decided to send Jamison and Nora to the Worthington Hall Boarding School operated by Reverend Gregory Trask. Barnabas tried to resurrect Quentin, but the ritual failed because Quentin wouldn't leave Jamison's body. Barnabas was, however, able to save Rachel. Reverend Trask's prayer was apparently answered when Quentin was restored to life, and Jamison was no longer possessed by Quentin, although Angelique was apparently the one that actually used her powers to remove the possession for her own reasons.

After returning from the dead, Quentin had increased paranoia about the possibility of Jenny's trying to kill him again. It was at this time that Magda Rakosi (Grayson Hall) and her husband, Sandor, discovered that Jenny was still alive. It turns out that she was Magda's sister, a gypsy. None of the Collins family had known that she was a gypsy, so it was a shock to Judith, Edward, and the rest of the family.

Magda threatened to curse Quentin if he did anything more to hurt Jenny. Quentin, however, was more worried about the possibility of Jenny's harming him or his beloved Beth Chavez. When Jenny caught Quentin and Beth kissing, she attacked him with a knife. In self-defense, Quentin killed Jenny. With the help of his brother Edward, in order to protect the Collins name, Jenny's death was covered up as an accidental fall down the stairs. Magda found a button from Quentin's suit in Jenny's hand and could easily tell that Jenny hadn't died from a fall but was strangled. She made plans to curse Quentin.

Quentin, believing that he was already cursed, and thinking he was haunted by the ghost of Jenny, went to Magda and tried to persuade her to lift the curse. His sister Judith gave him $10,000 in return for Quentin's signing away his right to live at Collinwood. Magda and Sandor took the money, and said the curse was lifted, the three having a drink to celebrate the agreement. Magda then threw the money back at Quentin and informed him that the drink he had just consumed contained the curse.

Quentin soon discovered that his curse would transform him into a werewolf whenever the moon was full. He had no memory of what he did as a werewolf. The transformation itself was painful and unbearable for Quentin. He was tormented by the blood of innocent victims he found on himself the morning after. Barnabas, sympathetic to Quentin's plight (as it was similar to his own), tried to help him overcome the curse, but to no avail. He did, however, succeed in altering Quentin's destiny, preventing the creation of the future timeline where Quentin's spirit plagued Collinwood. (In scenes when Quentin became a werewolf, the character was played by stuntman Alex Stevens.)

Quentin felt hopeless and contemplated suicide as the only way out. But Magda, having discovered that she had cursed not only Quentin but also all his first-born male descendants — including her sister Jenny's children and their progeny, of whose existence she had been unaware — for all eternity, decided to try to help find a cure for Quentin. Magda had heard of a magical hand possessed by a gypsy tribe controlled by King Johnny Romano (Paul Michael). Magda went away to find the magical hand of Count Andreas Petofi (Thayer Davis) and stole it. She returned to Collinwood with the hand, in hopes of lifting the werewolf curse from Quentin and his first-born male descendants. However, the hand's powers were uncontrollable, and it did as it pleased.

Then the powerful warlock Count Petofi and his servant Aristede (Michael Stroka) arrived in Collinsport, looking for his all-powerful hand. After causing much trouble for the Collins family by possessing Jamison with his own spirit, Petofi pressured Barnabas and Quentin to yield the magical hand. Barnabas and Quentin felt compelled to do so or risk Jamison's dying, and with him the entire future of the Collins family. (Jamison was destined to become the father of Elizabeth Collins Stoddard and Roger Collins.) So they gave Petofi back his hand.

Reverend Gregory Trask had become suspicious of Quentin and his strange behavior. He discovered Quentin with chains in his room, and Quentin confessed that he was the werewolf and wanted to be killed. Trask, wanting to make sure Quentin was the werewolf, took him to a cell in the basement of the Old House and waited for the moon to rise. Yet Quentin did not change that night, and Trask had no choice but to release him. Upon arriving back at his room, he met Count Petofi, who showed Quentin his portrait, and that the image of him had changed into the werewolf instead of Quentin himself. Petofi said he would expect the debt of "curing" Quentin to be paid at some point in the future.

Not only did the portrait cure Quentin of lycanthropy, but he was also rendered immortal because of the portrait. The artist, Charles Delaware Tate (Roger Davis), had used powers given to him by Count Petofi. In a pastiche of Oscar Wilde's The Picture of Dorian Gray, as long as the portrait remained intact, Quentin would remain forever young and free of the werewolf curse.

Quentin soon discovered that the price Count Petofi expected to be paid was his now immortal body. Count Petofi wanted to escape the gypsies, who wanted his powerful hand for themselves. Having discovered that the immortal Quentin was still alive in 1969, the year Barnabas had come from, Petofi used his powers to swap bodies with Quentin. Using Barnabas Collins' method of time travel, the I Ching wands, Petofi traveled 70 years into the future. In Quentin's body he would be forever young, and free from any threat from his gypsy enemies. However, something went wrong with Petofi's spell. The powers returned to the hand in his old body. Quentin used the powers of the hand to reverse the body swap. Before Petofi could swap bodies again, Quentin left Collinsport. Petofi apparently died in a fire at Tate's studio before he could possess Barnabas Collins' body, who he realized also existed in the future.

Quentin was still alive and wandering the streets of Collinsport by the year 1969. An amnesiac calling himself Grant Douglas (whose initials, G.D., were reversed from those of Dorian Gray), he reunited with Barnabas and soon regained his true memories. He worked closely alongside Barnabas and his trusted companion Dr. Julia Hoffman (Grayson Hall) and aided them against the likes of Angelique and the cult of the Leviathans.

During this time, Quentin discovered that his werewolf curse had indeed passed down along his family line, affecting his great-grandson Chris Jennings. (Chris's brother Tom [also played by Don Briscoe] became a vampire for unrelated reasons.)

== Night of Dark Shadows ==
In 1971, Metro-Goldwyn-Mayer released Night of Dark Shadows, a sequel to the 1970 film House of Dark Shadows. Although both films presumably share continuity with each other, they exist independently of the television series. Once again, David Selby resumed the role of Quentin Collins as well as that of his character's ancestor, Charles Collins. In Night of Dark Shadows, Quentin Collins is an artist who inherits Collinwood after the passing of the last remaining family member, Elizabeth Collins Stoddard (Joan Bennett).

Along with his wife, Tracy (Kate Jackson), Quentin becomes the victim of Angelique Collins (Lara Parker), a witch who was hanged more than a century before. Angelique's spirit operates in tandem with that of her nineteenth-century lover, Charles Collins, and slowly subverts Quentin's will. Before long, Quentin's soul is consumed by the evil of Charles Collins and he begins stalking Tracy and friends Alex (John Karlen) and Claire Jenkins (Nancy Barrett).

== Dark Shadows audio drama ==
Based on a stage play performed at a Dark Shadows convention, Return to Collinwood is an audio drama written by David Selby's son, Jamison Selby, and Jim Pierson centered on Quentin Collins' return to Collinwood. It starred most of the original cast, including David Selby (Quentin Collins), Kathryn Leigh Scott (Maggie Evans), John Karlen (Willie Loomis), Nancy Barrett (Carolyn Stoddard), Lara Parker (Angelique Bouchard), and many more. (David Selby apparently liked the first name of his Quentin Collins II character's nephew that he gave the name to his son.)

In 2006, Big Finish Productions continued the Dark Shadows saga with an original series of audio dramas, starring most of the original cast, with the addition of Selby's son Jamison and other voice actors. Like Return to Collinwood, Quentin Collins is the central character, and the first season dealt with Quentin's return to Collinwood and his attempts to re-establish the Collins family.

The first season comprises four discs, featuring David Selby (Quentin Collins), Lara Parker (Angelique), Kathryn Leigh Scott (Maggie Evans), and John Karlen (Willie Loomis).

== Big Finish Productions ==
More recently, the character has appeared in a series of audio plays produced by Big Finish Productions.

Season 1

- The House of Despair
- The Book of Temptation
- The Christmas Presence
- The Rage Beneath

Season 2

- Kingdom of the Dead

Dramatic readings

- The Skin Walkers
- The Path of Fate
- Blood Dance
- London's Burning
- The Creeping Fog

== Powers and abilities ==
- Knowledge of witchcraft and sorcery, adept at summoning and cursing.
- As a ghost, had vast paranormal powers including, teleportation, mind control, possession of children, and the usual haunting abilities associated with a poltergeist.
- Werewolf physiology gave the potential to transform into a berserk, wolf creature with enhanced strength, speed, and sense of smell, and gave him accelerated healing from any injury or wound, except for wounds caused by silver weapons or bullets. A magical portrait changed into the werewolf on the three nights of the full moon instead of Quentin.
- Eternal youth, due to magical portrait of him, painted in 1897.
- Cursed portrait also made him virtually un-killable. Any illness, injury, or fatal wound was healed without scarring by the portrait. However, it didn't protect him from magical attacks such as love spells. Nor did it prevent memory loss due to head trauma.

== See also ==
- List of Dark Shadows characters
