= List of Dark Shadows characters =

The following is a list of characters from the Dark Shadows franchise. The list distinguishes characters from the original ABC daytime soap opera series, the 1970s films, the 1991 NBC remake series, the 2004 WB pilot, and the 2012 film.

The series centers on vampire Barnabas Collins, portrayed by Jonathan Frid, and his descendants, the Collins family of Collinsport, Maine. Residents of Collinwood Mansion include brother and sister Roger Collins (Louis Edmonds) and Elizabeth Collins Stoddard (Joan Bennett), their children, and the governess Victoria Winters (Alexandra Moltke).

== 1966–1971: Dark Shadows ==
Actor	Character	Duration	Timeline
Mark Allen	Sam Evans	July 1 – July 26, 1966	Present day
Humbert Allen Astredo	Nicholas Blair	June 24, 1968 – March 26, 1970	Present day
Humbert Allen Astredo	Evan Hanley	March 12 – November 5, 1969	1897 flashback
Humbert Allen Astredo	Charles Dawson	November 9, 1970 – January 25, 1971	1840 flashback
Emory Bass	Mr. Best	January 6 – 20, 1970	Present day
Emory Bass	Mr. Best	January 6 – 20, 1970	1897 flashback
Conrad Bain	Wells	June 27, 1966 – November 26, 1968	Present day
Nancy Barrett	Carolyn Stoddard	June 28, 1966 – September 22, 1970	Present day
Nancy Barrett	Carolyn Stoddard	June 28, 1966 – September 22, 1970	1995
Nancy Barrett	Millicent Collins	November 29, 1967 – November 17, 1969	1795 flashback
Nancy Barrett	Charity Trask	April 8 – November 18, 1969	1897 flashback
Nancy Barrett	Carolyn Loomis	March 16, 1970 – July 2, 1970	1970 Parallel time
Nancy Barrett	Leticia Faye	September 30, 1970 – January 27, 1971	1840 flashback
Nancy Barrett	Amanda Collins	March 15 – March 22, 1971	1841 Parallel time
Nancy Barrett	Melanie Collins	January 27 – April 2, 1971	1841 Parallel time
Joan Bennett	Elizabeth Collins Stoddard	June 27, 1966 – January 27, 1971	Present day
Joan Bennett	Elizabeth Collins Stoddard	March 12 – July 8, 1970	1970 Parallel time
Joan Bennett	Naomi Collins	November 20, 1967 – April 9, 1968	1795 flashback
Joan Bennett	Judith Collins Trask	March 4 – November 13, 1969	1897 flashback
Joan Bennett	Flora Collins	September 28, 1970 – January 27, 1971	1840 flashback
Joan Bennett	Flora Collins	January 13 – April 2, 1971	1841 Parallel time
Lee Beery	Joanna Mills	January 1 – January 20, 1971	1840 flashback
Christopher Bernau	Philip Todd	November 19, 1969 – March 11, 1970	Present day
Clarice Blackburn	Sarah Johnson	September 27, 1966 – September 17, 1970	Present day
Clarice Blackburn	Sarah Johnson	September 27, 1966 – September 17, 1970	1995
Clarice Blackburn	Abigail Collins	November 21, 1967 – March 5, 1968	1795 flashback
Clarice Blackburn	Minerva Trask	April 16 – July 7, 1969	1897 flashback
Anita Bolster	Bathia Mapes	March 14 – March 18, 1968	1795 flashback
Don Briscoe	Tom Jennings	August 8 – November 25, 1968	Present day
Don Briscoe	Chris Jennings / werewolf^{1}	November 19, 1968 – March 25, 1970	Present day
Don Briscoe	Tim Shaw	April 14 – November 6, 1969	1897 flashback
Don Briscoe	Chris Collins	April 14 – April 27, 1970	1970 Parallel time
Katherine Bruce	Sandy	June 27, 1966	Present day
Angus Cairns	George Patterson	October 16 – 17, 1967	Present day
Kathleen Cody	Hallie Stokes	July 27, 1970 – January 8, 1971	Present day
Kathleen Cody	Carrie Stokes	July 27, 1970 – January 8, 1971	1840 flashback
Kathleen Cody	Carrie Stokes	July 27, 1970 – January 8, 1971	1995
Kathleen Cody	Carrie Stokes	February 19 – March 23, 1971	1841 Parallel time
Mary Cooper	Josette Collins	January 27 – April 2, 1971	1841 Parallel time
Don Crabtree	Sheriff	July 22 – July 31, 1970	1995
Terry Crawford	Beth Chavez	December 16, 1968 – November 7, 1969	1897 flashback
Terry Crawford	Edith Collins	October 8, 1970 – January 11, 1971	1897 flashback
Joel Crothers	Joe Haskell	June 28, 1966 – January 1, 1969	Present day
Joel Crothers	Nathan Forbes	November 20, 1967 – January 13, 1969	1795 flashback
Michael Currie	Jonas Carter	July 27 – August 9, 1966	Present day
Carol Crist	Susie	October 3 – October 31, 1966	Present day
Thayer David	Matthew Morgan	August 17 – December 20, 1966	Present day
Thayer David	Ben Stokes	November 28, 1967 – October 8, 1970	1795 flashback
Thayer David	Ben Stokes	November 28, 1967 – October 8, 1970	1840 flashback
Thayer David	Ben Stokes	May 12 – April 2, 1971	1841 Parallel time
Thayer David	Sandor Rakosi	March 3 – August 26, 1969	1897 flashback
Thayer David	Timothy Eliot Stokes	April 4, 1968 – January 27, 1971	Present day
Thayer David	Timothy Eliot Stokes	April 4, 1968 – January 27, 1971	1840 flashback
Thayer David	Timothy Eliot Stokes	April 4, 1968 – January 27, 1971	1995
Thayer David	Timothy Eliot Stokes	June 2 – July 17, 1970	1970 Parallel time
Thayer David	Andreas Petofi	July 9– November 12, 1969	1897 flashback
Thayer David	Mordecai Grimes	November 26, 1970 – January 7, 1971	1840 flashback
Diana Davila	Julianka	July 10 – July 15, 1969	1897 flashback
Roger Davis	Peter Bradford	January 11, 1968 – March 11, 1970	1795 flashback
Roger Davis	Jeff Clark	April 5 – December 3, 1968	Present day
Roger Davis	Ned Stuart	February 11 – February 26, 1969	Present day
Roger Davis	Dirk Wilkins	March 13 – June 16, 1969	1897 flashback
Roger Davis	Charles Delaware Tate	July 24, 1969 – January 28, 1970	Present day
Roger Davis	Charles Delaware Tate	July 24, 1969 – January 28, 1970	1897 flashback
Betsy Durkin	Victoria Winters #2	November 22 – December 20, 1968	Present day
Betsy Durkin	Victoria Winters #2	November 22 – December 20, 1968	1795 flashback
Jane Draper	Suki Forbes	February 1 – June 12, 1968	Present day
Jane Draper	Suki Forbes	February 1 – June 12, 1968	1795 flashback
Gaye Edmond	Harriet Collins	October 27, 1970	1840 flashback
Gaye Edmond	Stella Young	January 13 – February 4, 1971	1841 Parallel time
Louis Edmonds	Roger Collins	June 27, 1966 – July 10, 1970	Present day
Louis Edmonds	Roger Collins	March 20 – July 10, 1970	1970 Parallel time
Louis Edmonds	Joshua Collins	November 21, 1967 – January 6, 1969	1795 flashback
Louis Edmonds	Joshua Collins	November 21, 1967 – January 6, 1969	1840 flashback
Louis Edmonds	Joshua Collins	May 7 – May 12, 1970	1970 Parallel time
Louis Edmonds	Edward Collins	March 7 – October 24, 1969	1897 flashback
Louis Edmonds	Daniel Collins	September 20, 1970 – January 18, 1971	1840 flashback
Louis Edmonds	Brutus Collins	March 5 - April 2, 1971	1841 Parallel time
Elizabeth Eis	Buffie Harrington	April 20 – May 27, 1970	1970 Parallel time
Elizabeth Eis	Mildred Ward	December 1, 1970 - December 2, 1970	1840 flashback
Dana Elcar	George Patterson	September 8, 1966 – September 28, 1967	Present day
Joel Fabiani	Paul Stoddard	July 10, 1967	Present day
Alan Feinstein	Mike	June 28, 1966	Present day
Erica Fitz	Danielle Rogét	October 3, 1968	Present day
Erica Fitz	Danielle Rogét	October 3, 1968	1795 flashback
Erica Fitz	Leona Eltridge	October 3 – October 4, 1968	Present day
David Ford	Sam Evans	August 12, 1966 – July 8, 1968	Present day
David Ford	Andre du Pres	November 23, 1967 – December 28, 1967	1795 flashback
Conard Fowkes	Frank Garner	November 1, 1966 – March 3, 1967	Present day
Hugh Franklin	Richard Garner	November 1, 1966 – June 5, 1967	Present day
Jonathan Frid	Barnabas Collins	April 18, 1967 – January 27, 1971	Present day
Jonathan Frid	Barnabas Collins	April 18, 1967 – January 27, 1971	1795 flashback
Jonathan Frid	Barnabas Collins	April 18, 1967 – January 27, 1971	1840 flashback
Jonathan Frid	Barnabas Collins	April 18, 1967 – January 27, 1971	1897 flashback
Jonathan Frid	Barnabas Collins	April 18, 1967 – January 27, 1971	1970 Parallel time
Jonathan Frid	Barnabas Collins	April 18, 1967 – January 27, 1971	1995
Jonathan Frid	Barnabas Collins	April 18, 1967 – January 27, 1971	1841 Parallel time
Jonathan Frid	Bramwell Collins	January 26 – April 2, 1971	1841 Parallel time
Kay Frye	Pansy Faye	June 9 – June 18, 1969	1897 flashback
Anthony George	Burke Devlin	June 27 – October 19, 1967	Present day
Anthony George	Jeremiah Collins	November 21, – December 14, 1967	1795 flashback
Robert Gerringer	Dave Woodard	May 15, – October 5, 1967	Present day
Timothy Gordon	Hotel customer	July 28, 1966	Present day
Timothy Gordon	Hand of Barnabas	April 17, 1967	Present day
Timothy Gordon	Blue Whale Customer	October 16 – October 26, 1967	Present day
Timothy Gordon	Jeremiah Collins	December 26, 1967 – January 2, 1968	Present day
Timothy Gordon	Jeremiah Collins	April 2 – June 12, 1968	Present day
Timothy Gordon	Jeremiah Collins	October 13 – October 14, 1969	1897 flashback
Timothy Gordon	Riggs	January 16, 1968	1795 flashback
Timothy Gordon	Hand threatening Trask	February 28 – March 8, 1968	1795 flashback
Timothy Gordon	Spectator	March 8 – April 1, 1968	1795 flashback
Timothy Gordon	Spectator	January 9, 1969	1795 flashback
Timothy Gordon	Minister	November 5, 1968	Present day
Timothy Gordon	Hand of Count Petofi	June 25 – July 25, 1968	1897 flashback
Carolyn Groves	Victoria Winters #3	January 7 – January 10, 1969	Present day
Carolyn Groves	Victoria Winters #3	January 7 – January 10, 1969	1795 flashback
Michael Hadge	Buzz Hackett	June 13 – June 27, 1967	Present day
Grayson Hall	Julia Hoffman	June 30, 1967 – January 27, 1971	Present day
Grayson Hall	Julia Hoffman	June 30, 1967 – January 27, 1971	1840 flashback
Grayson Hall	Julia Hoffman	June 30, 1967 – January 27, 1971	1897 flashback
Grayson Hall	Julia Hoffman	June 30, 1967 – January 27, 1971	1995
Grayson Hall	Julia Hoffman	June 30, 1967 – January 27, 1971	1970 Parallel time
Grayson Hall	Natalie du Pres	November 22, 1967 – November 17, 1969	1795 flashback
Grayson Hall	Magda Rakosi	March 3 – November 18, 1969	1897 flashback
Grayson Hall	Julia Collins	January 12 – April 2, 1971	1841 Parallel time
Grayson Hall	Constance Collins	March 15, 1971	1680 Flashback
James Hall	Willie Loomis	March 30 – April 7, 1967	Present day
Colin Hamilton	Hamilton	June 19 – July 14. 1970	1970 Parallel time
Tom Happer	Jeremy Grimes	December 9, 1970 – January 8, 1971	1840 flashback
John Harkins	Lt. Costa	February 23, 1967	present day
John Harkins	Garth Blackwood	November 5, 1969 - November 12, 1969	1897 flashback
John Harkins	Mr. Strak	December 5, 1969 - December 8, 1969	Present day
John Harkins	Horace Gladstone	April 7, 1970 - May 8, 1970	1970 Parallel time
David Henesy	David Collins	June 30, 1966 – September 24, 1970	Present day
David Henesy	Daniel Collins	February 19, 1968 – March 25, 1968	1795 flashback
David Henesy	Daniel Collins	April 1 – June 3, 1970	1970 Parallel time
David Henesy	Jamison Collins	March 4 – September 10, 1969	1897 flashback
David Henesy	Tad Collins	July 24 – December 11, 1970	1840 flashback
David Henesy	Tad Collins	July 24 – December 11, 1970	1995
Jared Holmes	Dameon Edwards	April 16 – May 4, 1970	1970 Parallel time
Isabella Hoopes	Edith Collins	March 3 – March 10, 1969	1897 flashback
Barnard Hughes	Stuart Bronson	August 2, 1966	Present day
Cavada Humphrey	Janet Findley	December 17 – 19, 1968	Present day
David Hurst	Justin Collins	January 25 – February 19, 1971	1841 Parallel time
Kate Jackson	Daphne Harridge	July 28, 1970 – January 27, 1971	Present day
Kate Jackson	Daphne Harridge	July 28, 1970 – January 27, 1971	1840 flashback
Kate Jackson	Daphne Harridge	July 28, 1970 – January 27, 1971	1995
Kate Jackson	Daphne Harridge	January 11 – March 24, 1971	1841 Parallel time
Marilyn Joseph	Lorna Bell	November 10 – November 13, 1970	1840 flashback
Joseph Julian	Wilbur Strake	June 27 – June 28, 1966	Present day
John Karlen	Willie Loomis	April 11, 1967 – September 21, 1970	Present day
John Karlen	Willie Loomis	March 16 – June 26, 1970	1970 Parallel time
John Karlen	Carl Collins	March 10 – June 20, 1969	1897 flashback
John Karlen	Desmond Collins	October 6, 1970 – January 27, 1971	1840 flashback
John Karlen	Kendrick Young	January 18 – April 2, 1971	1841 Parallel time
Colleen Kelly	Susie	July 26 – August 19, 1966	Present day
Daniel Keyes	Caretaker	January 26 – September 12, 1967	Present day
Jerry Lacy	Tony Peterson	November 7, 1967 – September 11, 1968	Present day
Jerry Lacy	Reverend Trask	December 15, 1967 – June 27, 1968	1795 flashback
Jerry Lacy	Lamar Trask	October 1, 1970 – January 27, 1971	1840 flashback
Jerry Lacy	Gregory Trask	April 4 – November 13, 1969	1897 flashback
Jerry Lacy	Trask	April 16 – July 2, 1970	1970 Parallel time
John Lasell	Peter Guthrie	February 3 – March 13, 1967	Present day
Paula Laurence	Hannah Stokes	April 14 – May 14, 1970	1970 Parallel time
Gene Lindsey	Randall Drew	November 11 – November 26, 1970	1840 flashack
Edward Marshall	Harry Johnson	January 16, 1969	Present day
Edward Marshall	Ezra Braithwaite	May 29, 1969	1897 flashback
Michael McGuire	Judah Zachary	October 6, 1970 – January 26, 1971	1840 flashback
Donna McKechnie	Amanda Harris/Olivia Corey	August 5, 1969 – January 22, 1970	Present day
Donna McKechnie	Amanda Harris/Olivia Corey	August 5, 1969 – January 22, 1970	1897 flashback
Patrick McVey	John Harris	August 25, 1966	Present day
Paul Michael	Johnny Romano	August 18 – August 27, 1969	1897 flashback
Diana Millay	Laura Collins	December 14, 1966 – May 23, 1969	Present day
Diana Millay	Laura Collins	December 14, 1966 – May 23, 1969	1897 flashback
George Mitchell	Matthew Morgan	July 4 – July 18, 1966	Present day
Alexandra Moltke	Victoria Winters #1	June 27, 1966 – November 19, 1968	Present day
Alexandra Moltke	Victoria Winters #1	June 27, 1966 – November 19, 1968	1795 flashback
Duane Morris	Adam	April 19 – May 3, 1968	Present day
Duane Morris	Diablos	November 20 – 21, 1968	Present day
Peter Murphy	Caretaker	October 10 – November 9, 1967	Present day
Denise Nickerson	Amy Jennings	November 26, 1968 – April 29, 1970	Present day
Denise Nickerson	Nora Collins	March 24 – October 9, 1969	1897 flashback
Denise Nickerson	Amy Collins	April 1 – July 2, 1970	1970 Parallel time
Vince O'Brien	George Patterson	September 27, 1967 – January 24, 1969	Present day
Lara Parker	Angelique Bouchard Collins	November 22, 1967 – January 27, 1971	Present day
Lara Parker	Angelique Bouchard Collins	November 22, 1967 – January 27, 1971	1795 flashback
Lara Parker	Angelique Bouchard Collins	November 22, 1967 – January 27, 1971	1840 flashback
Lara Parker	Angelique Bouchard Collins	November 22, 1967 – January 27, 1971	1897 flashback
Lara Parker	Angelique Bouchard Collins	April 24 – July 13, 1970	1970 Parallel time
Lara Parker	Alexis Stokes	April 2 – April 27, 1970	1970 Parallel time
Lara Parker	Catherine Harridge Collins	January 11 – April 2, 1971	1841 Parallel time
Dennis Patrick	Jason McGuire	March 22 – July 17, 1967	Present day
Dennis Patrick	Paul Stoddard	November 19, 1969 – February 18, 1970	Present day
Christopher Pennock	Jeb Hawkes	January 23 – March 27, 1970	Present day
Christopher Pennock	Cyrus Longworth	March 25 – June 12, 1970	1970 Parallel time
Christopher Pennock	John Yaegar	April 20 – June 12, 1970	1970 Parallel time
Christopher Pennock	Sebastian Shaw	August 5 – September 23, 1970	Present day
Christopher Pennock	Gabriel Collins	September 25, 1970 – January 18, 1971	1840 flashback
Christopher Pennock	Gabriel Collins	January 14 – March 23, 1971	1841 Parallel time
Addison Powell	Judge Madigan	January 11, 1968	1795 flashback
Addison Powell	Eric Lang	April 8 - July 29, 1968	Present day
Keith Prentice	Morgan Collins	January 11 – April 2, 1971	1841 Parallel time
Keith Prentice	James Forsythe	March 2 – March 16, 1971	1841 Parallel time
Lisa Blake Richards	Sabrina Stuart	February 18, 1969 – March 25, 1970	Present day
Lisa Blake Richards	Sabrina Stuart	April 7 – June 11, 1970	1970 Parallel time
Robert Rodan	Adam	May 3 – December 2, 1968	Present day
Jane Rose	Mitchell	June 27, 1966	Present day
Mitchell Ryan	Burke Devlin	June 27, 1966 – June 7, 1967	Present day
Alfred Sandor	George Patterson	November 1, 1968	Present day
Frank Schofield	Bill Malloy	June 29 – 19, 1966	Present day
Geoffrey Scott	Schuyler Rumson	January 7 – March 27, 1970	Present day
Kathryn Leigh Scott	Maggie Evans	June 27, 1966 – September 23, 1970	Present day
Kathryn Leigh Scott	Maggie Evans	March 30 – July 17, 1970	1970 Parallel time
Kathryn Leigh Scott	Josette du Pres	September 30, 1966 – February 11, 1970	1795 flashback
Kathryn Leigh Scott	Rachel Drummond	March 7 – June 16, 1969	1897 flashback
Kathryn Leigh Scott	Katharine Soames	September 18, 1969 – January 28, 1970	1897 flashback
David Selby	Quentin Collins	December 16, 1968 – September 30, 1970	Present day
David Selby	Quentin Collins	December 16, 1968 – September 30, 1970	1995
David Selby	Quentin Collins	March 30 – July 17, 1970	1970 Parallel time
David Selby	Quentin Collins	October 9, 1970 – January 27, 1971	1840 flashback
David Selby	Quentin Collins	January 22 – March 12, 1971	1841 Parallel time
David Selby	Quentin Collins	January 22 – March 12, 1971	1897 flashback
William Shust	Fisher	October 6, 1967	Present day
Craig Slocum	Harry Johnson	April 12, 1968 – January 3, 1969	Present day
Craig Slocum	Noah Gifford	February 29 – March 22, 1968	1795 flashback
Sharon Smyth	Sarah Collins	June 16, 1967 – January 26, 1968	Present day
Sharon Smyth	Sarah Collins	June 16, 1967 – January 26, 1968	1795 flashback
Fred Stewart	Dr. Reeves	July 19, 1966 – February 1, 1967	Present day
Alex Stevens^{1}	Chris Jennings / werewolf	1968 – 1970	Present day
Gail Strickland	Dorcas Trilling	May 12 – June 2, 1969	1897 flashback
James Storm	Gerard Stiles	July 22, 1970 – January 27, 1971	Present day
James Storm	Gerard Stiles	July 22, 1970 – January 27, 1971	1840 flashback
James Storm	Gerard Stiles	July 22, 1970 – January 27, 1971	1995
James Storm	Gerard Stiles	February 10 – February 11, 1971	1841 Parallel time
Michael Stroka	Aristede	July 7 – November 10, 1969	1897 flashback
Michael Stroka	Bruno	February 3 – March 23, 1970	Present day
Michael Stroka	Bruno Hess	March 23 – June 19, 1970	1970 Parallel time
Michael Stroka	Laszlo Ferrari	October 26 – December 2, 1970	1840 flashback
K.C. Townsend	Sophie Baker	March 6, 1969	1897 flashback
Peter Turgeon	Dave Woodard	October 6 – November 14, 1967	Present day
Virginia Vestoff	Samantha Drew Collins	September 25, 1970 – January 20, 1971	1840 flashback
Virginia Vestoff	Samantha Drew	January 19, 1971 - January 20, 1971	1841 Parallel time
Abe Vigoda	Ezra Braithwaite	February 6–7, 1969	Present day
Abe Vigoda	Otis Greene	October 15, 1970	1840 flashback
Robert Viharo	Harry	June 28, 1966	Present day
Diana Walker	Carolyn Stoddard	September 11, 1968	Present day
Diana Walker	Carolyn Stoddard	September 11, 1968	1995
Marie Wallace	Danielle Rogét	October 4 – November 27, 1968	Present day
Marie Wallace	Danielle Rogét	October 4 – November 27, 1968	1795 flashback
Marie Wallace	Eve	October 4 – November 27, 1968	Present day
Marie Wallace	Eve	October 4 – November 27, 1968	1795 flashback
Marie Wallace	Jenny Collins	March 24, 1969 – December 3, 1969	1897 flashback
Marie Wallace	Megan Todd	November 19, 1969 – March 16, 1970	Present day
Donna Wandrey	Roxanne Drew	June 18 – July 17, 1970	1970 parallel time
Donna Wandrey	Roxanne Drew	August 17 – December 29, 1970	Present day
Donna Wandrey	Roxanne Drew	August 17 – December 29, 1970	1840 flashback
Elizabeth Wilson	Hopewell	June 27 – July 6, 1966	Present day
Richard Woods	Dave Woodard	April 28 – May 11, 1967	Present day

== 1970: House of Dark Shadows ==
Actor	Character
Humbert Allen Astredo	Dr. Forbes
Nancy Barrett	Carolyn Stoddard
Joan Bennett	Elizabeth Collins Stoddard
Don Briscoe	Todd Blake
Barbara Cason	Mrs. Sarah Johnson
Terry Crawford	Nurse
Thayer David	Elliot Stokes
Roger Davis	Jeff Clark
George DiCenzo	Deputy
Louis Edmonds	Roger Collins
Jonathan Frid	Barnabas Collins
Grayson Hall	Julia Hoffman
David Henesy	David Collins
John Karlen	Willie Loomis
Jerry Lacy	Minister
Philip Larson	Deputy
Paul Michael	Man
Lisa Blake Richards	Daphne Budd
Dennis Patrick	George Patterson
Kathryn Leigh Scott	Maggie Evans
Michael Stroka	Pallbearer

== 1971: Night of Dark Shadows ==
Actor	Character
Nancy Barrett	Claire Jenkins
Clarice Blackburn	Mrs. Castle
Thayer David	Reverend Strack
Grayson Hall	Carlotta Drake
Kate Jackson	Tracy Collins
John Karlen	Alex Jenkins
Diana Millay	Laura Collins
Lara Parker	Angelique Collins
Christopher Pennock	Gabriel Collins
Monica Rich	Sarah Castle
David Selby	Charles Collins
David Selby	Quentin Collins
Jim Storm	Gerard Stiles

== 1991: Dark Shadows ==
Actor	Character
Lysette Anthony	Angelique Bouchard
Barbara Blackburn	Carolyn Stoddard
Barbara Blackburn	Millicent Collins
Michael Cavanaugh	Andres du Pres
Michael Cavanaugh	George Patterson
Ben Cross	Barnabas Collins
Jim Fyfe	Ben Loomis
Jim Fyfe	Willie Loomis
Stefan Gierasch	Joshua Collins
Stefan Gierasch	Michael Woodard
Joanna Going	Josette du Pres
Joanna Going	Victoria Winters
Eddie Jones	Henry Evans
Eddie Jones	Sam Evans
Veronica Lauren	Sarah Collins
Joseph Gordon-Levitt	Daniel Collins
Joseph Gordon-Levitt	David Collins
Julianna McCarthy	Abigail Collins
Julianna McCarthy	Mrs. Sarah Johnson
Adrian Paul	Jeremiah Collins
Jean Simmons	Elizabeth Collins Stoddard
Jean Simmons	Naomi Collins
Rebecca Staab	Daphne Collins
Barbara Steele	Julia Hoffman
Barbara Steele	Natalie du Pres
Ely Pouget	Maggie Evans
Roy Thinnes	Roger Collins
Roy Thinnes	Reverend Trask
Michael T. Weiss	Peter Bradford
Michael T. Weiss	Joe Haskell

== 2004: Dark Shadows ==
Actor	Character
Blair Brown	Elizabeth Collins Stoddard
Jessica Chastain	Carolyn Stoddard
Matt Czuchry	Willie Loomis
Jenna Dewan	Sophia Loomis
Martin Donovan	Roger Collins
Alexander Gould	David Collins
Kelly Hu	Julia Hoffman
Ivana Miličević	Angelique Bouchard
Alec Newman	Barnabas Collins
Marley Shelton	Victoria Winters
Alexis Thorpe	Kelly Vance

== 2012: Dark Shadows ==
Actor	Character
Susanna Cappellaro	Naomi Collins
Helena Bonham Carter	Julia Hoffman
Alice Cooper	Himself
Johnny Depp	Barnabas Collins
Eva Green	Angelique Bouchard
Jackie Earle Haley	Willie Loomis
Bella Heathcote	Victoria Winters
Bella Heathcote	Josette du Pres
Ivan Kaye	Joshua Collins
Christopher Lee	Silas Clarney
Jonny Lee Miller	Roger Collins
Gulliver McGrath	David Collins
Chloë Grace Moretz	Carolyn Stoddard
Michelle Pfeiffer	Elizabeth Collins Stoddard
Ray Shirley	Mrs. Sarah Johnson

== Notes ==
1. Don Briscoe would portray Chris Jennings and Alex Stevens would portray the werewolf. Stevens was also the stunt coordinator.
