= Dark Shadows (disambiguation) =

Dark Shadows is an American supernatural daytime TV series which originally aired from 1966 to 1971.

Dark Shadows may refer to:

== Television ==
- Dark Shadows (1991 TV series), an adaptation of the original 1966 series
- Dark Shadows (2004 TV pilot), a pilot for a proposed adaptation of the 1966 series
- "Dark Shadows" (Mad Men), 2012 episode of Mad Men

== Film ==
- Dark Shadows (film), 2012 film adaptation of the 1966 series

== Radio ==
- Dark Shadows (Return to Collinwood), based on a stageplay
- Dark Shadows (Big Finish Productions)

== Other ==
- Dark Shadows (1944), an American crime drama short film starring Henry O'Neill; unrelated to the later supernatural TV series
- Dark Shadows (2011), a book on LGBT film by Harry Benshoff

== See also ==
- House of Dark Shadows, 1970 film adaptation of the 1966 series
- Curse of Dark Shadows, 1971 proposed sequel to the 1970 film
- Night of Dark Shadows, 1971 film inspired by the 1966 series
