= Dark Shadows (audio drama) =

Series of audio dramas

MPI Home Video Big Finish Productions audio drama
- Series
- Produced by: Jim Pierson; Jamison Selby; Stuart Manning; Joseph Lidster; James Goss; David Darlington
- Executive producer: Jason Haigh-Ellery
- Release date: 2004–2019

Dark Shadows is a series of audio dramas continuing the story of the 1966–1971 television soap opera of the same title. There have been two productions of Dark Shadows audio dramas. The first production, released in 2004 by MPI Home Video, was based on a 2003 stage play. Since 2006, Big Finish Productions have produced a number of audio dramas.

== MPI Home Video ==
According to actor David Selby, who portrays Quentin Collins, "Return to Collinwood was my idea. I felt an audio thing would be a neat way to do new Dark Shadows scripts, at halfway decent prices. Jamison, my son, wrote it, tying up loose ends from 1971 and establishing continuity." It starred Selby, Kathryn Leigh Scott, John Karlen, Nancy Barrett, Lara Parker, Roger Davis, Marie Wallace, Christopher Pennock, Donna Wandrey, James Storm, and Terry Crawford.

No.	Title	Directed by	Written by	Featuring	Running Time	Release Date	Prod. code
TBA	"Return to Collinwood"	Jamison Selby	Jamison Selby	Angelique Bouchard; Quentin Collins; Maggie Evans; Willie Loomis; Sebastian Shaw; Carolyn Stoddard; Ned Stuart	1:43:35	2004	CD7645

== Big Finish Productions ==
=== Full cast dramas ===
The first season featured David Selby (Quentin Collins), Lara Parker (Angelique Bouchard Collins), Kathryn Leigh Scott (Maggie Evans), and John Karlen (Willie Loomis). The role of Barnabas Collins was recast with Andrew Collins. Robert Rodan, who played Adam in the original series, also appears in the first and fourth story, playing a new character. A second series was released in 2010. In addition to the cast returning from Series One, Kingdom of the Dead also featured Lysette Anthony, Alec Newman, Lizzie Hopley, Jerry Lacy, and David Warner. The third full cast drama Blood & Fire, released on June 27, 2016 to celebrate exactly 50 years since the start of the original TV series, featured Parker, Joanna Going (Laura Murdoch Stockbridge), Nancy Barrett (Isobel Collins), John Karlen (Alfred Loomis), Jerry Lacy (Malachi Sands), Kathryn Leigh Scott (Patience Collins), Christopher Pennock (Uriah Spencer Stockbridge), Lisa Richards (Euphemia Spencer Stockbridge), Mitchell Ryan (Caleb Collins), David Selby (Theodore Collins), James Storm (Abraham Harkaway), and Marie Wallace (Dorothea Summers).

No.	Title	Directed by	Written by	Featuring	Running Time	Release Date	Prod. code
1.1	"The House of Despair"	Gary Russell	Stuart Manning	Angelique Bouchard; Barnabas Collins; Quentin Collins; Maggie Evans; Willie Loomis	1:10:59	November 2006	BFPDSCD01
1.2	"The Book of Temptation"	Gary Russell	Scott Handcock	Angelique Bouchard; Barnabas Collins; Quentin Collins; Maggie Evans; Willie Loomis	1:08:43	November 2006	BFPDSCD02
1.3	"The Christmas Presence"	Gary Russell	Scott Handcock	Angelique Bouchard; Barnabas Collins; Quentin Collins; Josette DuPres; Maggie Evans; Willie Loomis; Carolyn Stoddard; Timothy Eliot Stokes	1:14:21	January 2007	BFPDSCD03
1.4	"The Rage Beneath"	Gary Russell	Scott Alan Woodard	Angelique Bouchard; Barnabas Collins; Quentin Collins; Maggie Evans; Willie Loomis	1:13:55	January 2007	BFPDSCD04
2.0	"Kingdom of the Dead"	Darren Gross	Stuart Manning; Eric Wallace	Angelique Bouchard; Barnabas Collins; David Collins; Quentin Collins; Maggie Evans; Willie Loomis; Carolyn Stoddard	4:01:49	July 2010	BFPDSCD05; BFPDSCD06; BFPDSCD07; BFPDSCD08
3.0	"Blood & Fire"	Ursula Burton; Joseph Lidster	Roy Gill	Angelique Bouchard; Laura Murdoch Stockbridge; Abigail Collins; Joshua Collins	2:33:05	27 June 2016	BFPDSCD09

==== Selected plots ====
- 3, The Christmas Presence: As Christmas draws near, Quentin Collins issues an arcane invitation into the unknown. Meanwhile, as children are reported missing across Collinsport, the festive season brings Collinwood new terrors, when a persuasive spirit seeks to divide and conquer...
- 4, The Rage Beneath: As a storm rages across Collinsport, ancient forces are stirring throughout the town. The waters of the ocean hold dark secrets for the Collins family - secrets that must be revealed once and for all. As a malevolent power takes hold, Quentin Collins finds himself facing a final confrontation...

=== Audiobooks ===
No.	Title	Directed by	Written by	Featuring	Running Time	Release Date	Prod. code
1	"Angelique's Descent: Part 1 - Innocence"	Darren Gross	Lara Parker; Stuart Manning	Angelique Bouchard	2:31:54	August 2007	BFPDSCAD01
2	"Angelique's Descent: Part 2 - Betrayal"	Darren Gross	Lara Parker; Stuart Manning	Angelique Bouchard	2:36:30	August 2007	BFPDSCAD02
3	"Clothes of Sand"	Stuart Manning	Stuart Manning	Maggie Evans	1:09:30	July 2008	BFPDSCDAD03
4	"The Ghost Watcher"	Stuart Manning	Stuart Manning	Maggie Evans	1:05:40	July 2008	BFPDSCDAD04
5	"The Skin Walkers"	Darren Gross	Scott Handcock	Angelique Bouchard; Quentin Collins	1:12:47	November 2008	BFPDSCDAD05
6	"The Path of Fate"	Darren Gross	Stephen Mark Rainey	Angelique Bouchard; Quentin Collins	1:10:37	November 2008	BFPDSCDAD06
7	"The Wicked and the Dead"	Darren Gross	Eric Wallace	Carl Collins; Gregory Trask	1:15:20	January 2009	BFPDSCDAD07
8	"Echoes of Insanity"	Darren Gross	D Lynn Smith	Angelique Bouchard; Willie Loomis	1:15:45	July 2009	BFPDSCDAD08
9	"Curse of the Pharaoh"	Joe Salvatore	Stephen Mark Rainey	Carolyn Stoddard	1:15:14	September 2009	BFPDSCDAD09
10	"Final Judgment"	Darren Gross	D Lynn Smith	Angelique Bouchard; Josette DuBois	1:04:42	February 2010	BFPDSCDAD10
11	"Blood Dance"	Darren Gross	Stephen Mark Rainey	Quentin Collins	1:05:02	April 2010	BFPDSCDAD11
12	"The Night Whispers"	Darren Gross; Jim Pierson	Stuart Manning	Barnabas Collins; Willie Loomis	49:49	June 2010	BFPDSCDAD12
13	"London's Burning"	Darren Gross	Joseph Lidster	Quentin Collins	58:42	June 2010	BFPDSCDAD13
14	"The Doll House"	Stuart Manning	James Goss	Beth Chavez; Jenny Collins	1:02:29	July 2010	BFPDSCDAD14
15	"The Blind Painter"	Nigel Fairs; Darren Gross	Jonathan Morris	Charles Delaware Tate	1:03:15	May 2011	BFPDSCDAD15
16	"The Death Mask"	Darren Gross	Mark Thomas Passmore	Angelique Bouchard; Tony Peterson	58:15	May 2011	BFPDSCDAD16
17	"The Creeping Fog"	Darren Gross	Simon Guerrier	Quentin Collins	1:06:10	June 2011	BFPDSCDAD17
18	"The Carrion Queen"	Darren Gross	Lizzie Hopley	Angelique Bouchard; Gregory Trask	55:44	June 2011	BFPDSCDAD18
19	"The Poisoned Soul"	Jim Pierson	James Goss	Pansy Faye; Charity Trask	1:06:10	July 2011	BFPDSCDAD19
20	"The Lost Girl"	Darren Gross	D Lynn Smith	Josette DuBois	55:14	July 2011	BFPDSCDAD20
21	"The Crimson Pearl"	Joseph Baker; James Goss; Darren Gross; Joseph Lidster	James Goss; Joseph Lidster	Angelique Bouchard; Millicent Collins; Quentin Collins; Rachel Drummond; Maggie Evans; Jeb Hawkes; Carolyn Stoddard; Lamar Trask	1:08:51	August 2011	BFPDSCDAD21
22	"The Voodoo Amulet"	Darren Gross; James Goss	Mark Thomas Passmore	Angelique Bouchard; Tony Peterson	1:00:17	February 2012	BFPDSCDAD22
23	"The House by the Sea"	Joseph Lidster	James Goss	Nicholas Blair; Danielle Roget	1:10:59	March 2012	BFPDSCDAD23
24	"Dress Me In Dark Dreams"	James Goss	Marty Ross	Edith Collins; Judith Collins	1:00:05	April 2012	BFPDSCDAD24
25	"The Eternal Actress"	Jim Pierson; Darren Gross	Nev Fountain	Amanda Harris	1:03:58	May 2012	BFPDSCDAD25
26	"The Fall of the House of Trask"	Darren Gross	Joseph Lidster	Pansy Faye; Charity Trask; Gregory Trask	1:09:37	June 2012	BFPDSCDAD26
27	"Operation Victor"	Darren Gross	Jonathan Morris	Quentin Collins	57:54	July 2012	BFPDSCDAD27
28	"Speak No Evil"	Scott Handcock	Scott Handcock	Tad Collins	51:08	21 August 2012	BFPDSCDAD28
29	"The Last Stop"	Darren Gross	David Llewellyn	Angelique Bouchard; Tony Peterson	1:01:32	10 September 2012	BFPDSCDAD29
30	"Dreaming of the Water"	Darren Gross	Kymberly Ashman	Maggie Evans; Sebastian Shaw	1:10:21	31 October 2012	BFPDSCDAD30
31	"The Haunted Refrain"	Darren Gross; Jim Pierson	Aaron Lamont	Quentin Collins	1:02:31	17 January 2013	BFPDSCDAD31
32	"A Collinwood Christmas"	Darren Gross; Joseph Lidster; Jim Pierson	Lizzie Hopley	Gabriel Collins; Jamison Collins; Quentin Collins; Josette DuPres; Kitty Hampshire	52:59	17 December 2012	BFPDSCDAD32
33	"The Phantom Bride"	Darren Gross; David Darlington	Mark Thomas Passmore	Angelique Bouchard; Tony Peterson	56:08	29 May 2013	BFPDSCDAD33
34	"Beneath the Veil"	Darren Gross; David Darlington; Jim Pierson	Kymberly Ashman	Maggie Evans; Eve; Amy Jennings; Danielle Roget; Carolyn Stoddard	1:06:03	8 July 2013	BFPDSCDAD34
35	"The Enemy Within"	Darren Gross; David Darlington	Will Howells	Cyrus Longworth; Carolyn Stoddard; Sabrina Stuart	1:03:06	30 July 2013	BFPDSCDAD35
36	"The Lucifer Gambit"	David Darlington; Darren Gross	Eric Wallace	Amy Jennings; Carolyn Stoddard; Sabrina Stuart	1:04:40	30 August 2013	BFPDSCDAD36
37	"The Flip Side"	David Darlington; Darren Gross; Jim Pierson	Cody Quijano-Schell	Maggie Evans; Amy Jennings; Carolyn Stoddard; Sabrina Stuart	1:01:55	25 September 2013	BFPDSCDAD37
38	"Beyond the Grave"	David Darlington; Darren Gross; Jim Pierson	Aaron Lamont	Maggie Evans; Eve; Amy Jennings; Danielle Roget; Carolyn Stoddard	55:25	31 October 2013	BFPDSCDAD38
39	"Curtain Call"	David Darlington; Joseph Lidster	David Lemon	Leticia Faye; Gerard Stiles	1:04:20	31 January 2014	BFPDSCDAD39
40	"The Harvest of Souls"	David Darlington; Darren Gross	James Goss	Nicholas Blair; Maggie Evans	1:17:47	18 February 2014	BFPDSCDAD40
41	"The Happier Dead"	David Darlington; Darren Gross	Adam Usden	Maggie Evans; Amy Jennings; Carolyn Stoddard; Sabrina Stuart	1:12:56	21 March 2014	BFPDSCDAD41
42	"Carriage of the Damned"	David Darlington; Darren Gross	Alan Flanagan	Amy Jennings; Gerard Stiles; Hallie Stokes; Sabrina Stuart	1:05:35	10 April 2014	BFPDSCDAD42
43	"The Devil Cat"	David Darlington; Darren Gross	Mark Thomas Passmore	Angelique Bouchard; Tony Peterson	1:17:38	29 May 2014	BFPDSCDAD43
44	"The Darkest Shadow"	David Darlington; Joseph Lidster	Nev Fountain	Quentin Collins; Amanda Harris	2:21:58	10 July 2014	BFPDSCDAD44
45	"Panic"	Joseph Lidster; Jim Pierson	Roy Gill	Quentin Collins	1:05:08	8 May 2015	BFPDSCDAD45
46	"The Curse of Shurafa"	Ursula Burton; David Darlington	Rob Morris	Barnabas Collins; Amy Jennings	1:15:09	16 June 2015	BFPDSCDAD46
47	"In the Twinkling of an Eye"	David Darlington; Jim Pierson	Penelope Faith	TBA	1:02:26	22 July 2015	BFPDSCDAD47
48	"Deliver Us From Evil"	Ursula Burton; David Darlington	Aaron Lamont	Amy Jennings; Cyrus Longworth; Danielle Roget; Carolyn Stoddard; Sabrina Stuart	1:09:54	26 August 2015	BFPDSCDAD48
49	"Tainted Love"	Joseph Lidster	Daniel Collard	David Collins; Amy Jennings; Hallie Stokes	1:17:35	23 September 2015	BFPDSCDAD49
50	"…And Red All Over"	David Darlington; Jim Pierson	Cody Schell	Burke Devlin; Maggie Evans	50:07	27 October 2015	BFPDSCDAD50

==== Selected summaries ====
- 5 The Skin Walkers: Quentin Collins meets the terrifying Skin Walkers in nineteenth century New York.
- 11 Blood Dance: Chicago, 1929. Quentin Collins encounters a mysterious nightclub owner. This play sees the return of original series actor Lisa Richards to the world of Dark Shadows after forty years.
- 12 The Night Whispers: As a storm rages through Collinsport, a mysterious spirit threatens Barnabas Collins. The Night Whispers features Jonathan Frid returning to the role of Barnabas.
- 13 London's Burning: London, 1906. Quentin investigates how music hall star Rosie Faye is connected to a series of cases of spontaneous human combustion.
- 14 The Doll House: Jenny Collins' fate is determined as she reveals her past to Beth.

=== Bloodlust miniseries ===
In 2015, a miniseries, entitled “Bloodlust”, consisted of thirteen episodes released in twice-weekly downloadable installments as to emulate the original soap opera format of the show.

No.	Title	Directed by	Written by	Featuring	Running Time	Release Date	Prod. code
TBA	"Bloodlust: Volume 1" "Snowflake"; Episodes 1-6	Ursula Burton; David Darlington	Alan Flanagan; Will Howells; Joseph Lidster	Angelique Bouchard; Barnabas Collins; David Collins; Quentin Collins; Maggie Evans; Amy Jennings	3:39:42	27 January 2015	BFPDSBLCD01
TBA	"Bloodlust: Volume 2" Episodes 7-13	Ursula Burton; David Darlington	Alan Flanagan; Will Howells; Joseph Lidster	Angelique Bouchard; Barnabas Collins; David Collins; Quentin Collins; Maggie Evans; Amy Jennings; Willie Loomis; Carolyn Stoddard	4:33:03	20 February 2015	BFPDSBLCD02

=== Bloodline miniseries ===
The follow-up to “Bloodlust” was another thirteen-episode miniseries. It was released in 2019.

No.	Title	Directed by	Written by	Featuring	Running Time	Release Date	Prod. code
TBA	"Bloodline: Volume 1" Episodes 1-6	Ursula Burton; David Darlington; Joseph Lidster	Aaron Lamont; Will Howells; Alan Flanagan; Rob Morris	Amy Jennings; Barnabas Collins; Carolyn Stoddard; Quentin Collins; Maggie Evans; Dr Julia Hoffman; Sabrina Jennings	3:35:00	April 2019	BFPDSBLINECD01
TBA	"Bloodline: Volume 2" Episodes 7-13	Ursula Burton; David Darlington; Joseph Lidster	Aaron Lamont; Will Howells; Alan Flanagan; Rob Morris	Amy Jennings; Barnabas Collins; Carolyn Stoddard; Quentin Collins; Maggie Evans; Dr Julia Hoffman; Sabrina Jennings	4:56:00	May 2019	BFPDSBLINECD02

=== The Tony & Cassandra Mysteries ===
No.	Title	Directed by	Written by	Featuring	Running Time	Release Date	Prod. code
1	"Series 1" "The Mystery at Crucifix Heights" "The Mystery of La Danse Macabre" "The Mystery of Flight 493" "The Mystery of Karmina Sonata"	David Darlington; Darren Gross; Joseph Lidster	Philip Meeks; Zara Symes; Alan Flanagan; Aaron Lamont	Tony Peterson; Cassandra Collins	TBA	October 2017	BFPDSCD16
2	"Series 2" "The Mystery of Stone Heart Studios" "The Mystery of West Vale Sanitarium" "The Mystery of Apartment 493" "The Mystery of the Soulmates Hotel"	David Darlington; Alan Flanagan; Darren Gross; Joseph Lidster	Philip Meeks; Joshua J. Price & Tanja Milojevic; Alan Flanagan; Grace Knight	Tony Peterson; Cassandra Collins	TBA	November 2018	BFPDSCD18
3	"Series 3" "The Mystery of the Grandest Order" "The Mystery of the Fisherman’s Wife" "The Mystery of a Mother’s Love" "The Mystery of the Jack-in-the-Box"	David Darlington; Darren Gross; Joseph Lidster	Aaron Lamont; Jessica Smith; William Proudler; Zara Symes	Tony Peterson; Cassandra Collins	TBA	October 2019	BFPDSCD19

=== Short story collections ===
No.	Title	Directed by	Written by	Featuring	Running Time	Release Date	Prod. code
1	"Echoes of the Past" "Trask the Exorcist" "The Missing Reel" "Lunar Tides" "Confession"	Ursula Burton	Jerry Lacy; Ian Farrington; Philip Meeks; Paul Phipps	Reverend Trask; Quentin Collins; Maggie Evans; Angelique Bouchard	2:28:47	27 June 2016	BFPDSCD10
2	"Haunting Memories" "Hell Wind" "Communion" "The Ghost Ship" "A Face from the Past"	Darren Gross	Marcy Robin; Adam Usden; Lara Parker; Kay Stonham	Josette DuPres; Gregory Trask; Angelique Bouchard; Elizabeth Collins Stoddard	2:26:15	8 December 2016	BFPDSCD11
3	"Phantom Melodies" "Last Orders at the Blue Whale" "The Scarlet Bride" "On the Line" "In a Broken Dream"	Andrew Collins; David Darlington; Jim Pierson	Rob Morris; Ian Atkins; Ian Farrington; Penelope Faith	Harry Johnson; Barnabas Collins; Carolyn Stoddard; Amy Jennings	2:31:41	20 February 2017	BFPDSCD12
4	"Dreams of Long Ago" "The Reflected Man" "Old Acquaintance" "Devil’s Rock" "Cobwebs"	David Darlington; Jim Pierson	Alan Ronald; Matthew Waterhouse; Kate Webster; Aaron Lamont	Sabrina Stuart; Quentin Collins; Barnabas Collins; Willie Loomis; Sebastian Shaw	TBA	May 2017	BFPDSCD13
5	"Love Lives On" "Tuesdays and Thursdays" "The Velvet Room" "Behind Closed Doors" "The Suitcase"	Darren Gross; Joseph Lidster; Jim Pierson	Cody Schell; Antonio Rastelli; Paul Phipps; Alan Flanagan	Timothy Eliot Stokes; Janet Findley; Gerard Stiles; Hallie Stokes; Sabrina Stuart; Cyrus Longworth	TBA	July 2017	BFPDSCD14
6	"Shadows of the Night" "Trio" "Honeymoon From Hell" "Retreat" "1:53 AM"	David Darlington; Jim Pierson	Nick Myles; Antoni Pearce; Daniel Hinchliffe; Lila Whelan	Carolyn Stoddard; Cyrus Longworth; Sabrina Stuart; Amy Jennings	TBA	December 2017	BFPDSCD15
7	"Maggie & Quentin: The Lovers' Refrain" "The Girl Beneath The Water " "The Sand That Speaks His Name" "The Hollow Winds That Beckon" "The Paper To The Flame"	David Darlington; Darren Goss; Joseph Lidster	Lila Whelan; Mark Thomas Passmore; Cody Schell; Alan Flanagan	Maggie Evans; Quentin Collins	TBA	June 2018	BFPDSCD17

== Awards and nominations ==
Name of the award ceremony, year presented, category, nominee(s) of the award, and the result of the nomination
Award ceremony	Year	Category	Work(s)	Result	Ref.
Scribe Awards	2013	Best Audio	The Eternal Actress	Won	
Scribe Awards	2013	Best Audio	Dress Me	Nominated	
Scribe Awards	2014	Best Audio	The Phantom Bride	Nominated	
Scribe Awards	2014	Best Audio	The Flip Side	Nominated	
Scribe Awards	2015	Best Audio	The Darkest Shadow	Nominated	
Scribe Awards	2015	Best Audio	The Devil Cat	Nominated	
Scribe Awards	2016	Best Audio	Bloodlust	Nominated	
Scribe Awards	2016	Best Audio	In the Twinkling of an Eye	Nominated	
Scribe Awards	2017	Best Audio	Blood & Fire	Won	
Scribe Awards	2019	Best Audio	The Girl Beneath the Water	Nominated	
BBC Audio Drama Awards	2016	Best Online Only Audio Drama	Dark Shadows: Bloodlust	Nominated	
