= Stroka =

Stroka is a surname. Notable people with the surname include:

- Anna Stroka (1923–2020), Polish literary historian, author, and translator
- Michael Stroka (1938–1997), American actor
- Małgorzata Stroka (born 1980), Polish fencer
