= House of Dark Shadows =

1970 film by Dan Curtis

- Promotional film poster
- Directed by: Dan Curtis
- Written by: Sam Hall; Gordon Russell
- Based on: Dark Shadows (1966 TV series) by Dan Curtis
- Produced by: Dan Curtis
- Starring: Jonathan Frid; Grayson Hall; Kathryn Leigh Scott; Roger Davis; Nancy Barrett; John Karlen; Louis Edmonds; Donald Briscoe; David Henesy; Dennis Patrick; Joan Bennett
- Cinematography: Arthur Ornitz
- Edited by: Arline Garson
- Music by: Robert Cobert
- Production companies: Dan Curtis Productions; Metro-Goldwyn-Mayer
- Distributed by: Metro-Goldwyn-Mayer
- Release date: October 28, 1970
- Running time: 97 minutes
- Country: United States
- Language: English
- Budget: $750,000 (estimated)
- Box office: $1,836,000 (US/ Canada rentals)

House of Dark Shadows is a 1970 American gothic horror film produced and directed by Dan Curtis, based on his Dark Shadows television series. In this film expansion, vampire Barnabas Collins (Jonathan Frid) searches for a cure for vampirism so he can marry Maggie Evans, a woman who resembles his long-lost fiancée Josette du Pres (Kathryn Leigh Scott). Filming took place at Lyndhurst Estate in Tarrytown, New York, with additional footage at nearby Sleepy Hollow Cemetery.

Curtis' feature directorial debut, the film was released by MGM on October 28, 1970, at the height of the television series' popularity, and was a commercial success. Curtis followed this film one year later with Night of Dark Shadows, another expansion of the Shadows franchise, dealing with the witch Angelique Collins (Lara Parker).

== Plot ==
Willie Loomis, the Collins family handyman, is searching for old treasure in the family mausoleum when he accidentally frees Barnabas Collins, a 175-year-old vampire who enslaves him. Upon his release, he attacks Daphne Budd, the secretary to Collinwood's matriarch, Elizabeth Collins Stoddard. She is discovered by Jeff Clark, who takes her back to the house where Dr. Julia Hoffman attends to her.

Later, Barnabas introduces himself to the family under the guise of a "cousin from England". Elizabeth and the others are intrigued by Barnabas and take an instant liking to him. However, Elizabeth's daughter, Carolyn Stoddard, and Professor T. Eliot Stokes, a friend of the family, are incredulous. Barnabas insists on moving into the Old House and hosting a ball in honour of the family. But on the night of the ball, Carolyn is bitten by Barnabas while she is getting ready.

Later on at the ball, he is introduced to young David Collins' governess and Jeff's girlfriend, Maggie Evans, and is instantly smitten with her, as she bears a striking resemblance to his long-lost fiancée, Josette du Pres. Maggie is thinking about leaving Collinwood, but Barnabas persuades her to stay. Back at the Old House, he tells Willie about Josette and how she took her own life on the night they were to be married. Carolyn overhears and, out of jealousy, threatens to expose him. Enraged, Barnabas delivers a deadly bite to Carolyn, much to Willie's horror. A shaken Willie takes Carolyn back home; she slowly walks to the doorway, but she is soon discovered slumped in the doorway—dead—by the housekeeper, Mrs. Sarah Johnson.

Funeral services are held for Carolyn, and she is buried in the Collins family mausoleum. Dr. Hoffman, upon analyzing samples of Carolyn's blood, recognizes a trace of elements of the same unknown virus that was present in Daphne Budd's blood sample. Thereafter, Professor Stokes confers with Julia and tells her that he suspects that the recent attacks in Collinsport may have been caused by a vampire. Julia is initially skeptical but soon becomes an ally of Stokes when he informs the family of his theory.

Meanwhile, Carolyn rises as a vampire and menaces David. Stokes and Julia try to explain, but Elizabeth and her brother Roger Collins refuse to listen. Carolyn's fiancé, Todd Blake, encounters her, and she bites him. After he is taken back to Collinwood, the family realizes that Stokes and Julia were correct about the vampire. Todd again sneaks out in search of Carolyn, but she is cornered and staked, instantly destroying her.

Julia eventually discovers that Barnabas is the vampire responsible. Thus, she visits him at the Old House and convinces him that she can use modern-day medicine to make him human, and he reluctantly agrees. Julia gives him injections that allow him to walk in the daylight and apparently no longer need to ingest human blood to survive. Over time, Barnabas and Maggie begin to spend time together while Jeff is away in Boston. Stokes confronts Julia about helping Barnabas—and realizes she is in love with him—and reminds her that he is in love with Maggie. Overcome with jealousy, Julia gives Barnabas an overdose of her serum, which causes him to age rapidly to his true age, 175 years. In a rage, he strangles her to death. A terrified Maggie witnesses this and tries to flee, but is caught and bitten by Barnabas before she can escape, and he vows to come back for her. Jeff soon returns, and he is informed of the family history by Stokes and Roger and that Barnabas intends to make Maggie his bride. That night, Barnabas bites Maggie again, rejuvenating him, and then abducts her.

Jeff and the others pursue them; however, Roger and Stokes are killed (both turned into vampires whom Jeff destroys). Jeff eventually finds Maggie at an old church in a trance and in Josette's wedding gown. Willie warns him against trying to stop Barnabas and knocks him out. Willie leads Maggie out of the room to where Barnabas is waiting for her. He lays her down on an altar and is about to bite her when Jeff wakes up and shoots at him, but Willie, running to stop Barnabas, moves in the way, and is hit by Jeff's crossbow bolt. Barnabas lures Jeff out of his hiding place and forces him to be a witness by placing him in a trance. However, as Barnabas again attempts to bite Maggie, he screams in pain as he's struck in his back. Turning around, he's shocked, then enraged, to discover that Willie—in his final act of redemption—had stabbed him with the crossbow bolt. Barnabas strangles the mortally wounded Willie, but Loomis's attack breaks Jeff out of Barnabas's trance long enough for Jeff to finish driving the bolt through the vampire's back, ultimately bursting through his bloody chest. Maggie, now no longer entranced, is rescued by Jeff, both briefly observing the bodies of the presumably dead vampire and Willie Loomis before departing the ruined chapel.

In a post-credits scene, Barnabas's body transforms into a bat and then flies away.

== Cast ==
- Jonathan Frid as Barnabas Collins
- Grayson Hall as Dr. Julia Hoffman
- Kathryn Leigh Scott as Maggie Evans
- Roger Davis as Jeff Clark
- Nancy Barrett as Carolyn Stoddard
- John Karlen as Willie Loomis
- Thayer David as Professor T. Eliot Stokes
- Louis Edmonds as Roger Collins
- Donald Briscoe as Todd Blake
- David Henesy as David Collins
- Dennis Patrick as Sheriff George Patterson
- Lisa Richards as Daphne Budd
- Jerry Lacy as Minister
- Barbara Cason as Mrs. Sarah Johnson
- Paul Michael as Old Man
- Humbert Allen Astredo as Dr. Forbes
- Terry Crawford as Nurse Shepherd
- Michael Stroka as Pallbearer
- George DiCenzo as Deputy
- Joan Bennett as Elizabeth Collins Stoddard

== Production ==
Dark Shadows creator Dan Curtis began pitching the idea of a film based on his gothic soap opera sometime in 1968. His original idea had been to edit together footage from the original TV series into a feature-length film, an idea which was quickly abandoned. The project was finally given the greenlight at MGM by company president James Aubrey in 1970. Curtis decided to use the original Barnabas Collins storyline as the basis for the film, but with a modified conclusion. Unrestricted by TV's censors, the film is far more graphically violent than its television counterpart, with dripping vampire bites and bloody deaths.

The film was shot in six weeks for a budget of $750,000. Principal shooting took place at several historic locations, including the Lyndhurst Estate in Tarrytown, New York, where the production had to work around the scheduled public tours of the house. Additional footage was shot at nearby Sleepy Hollow Cemetery; parts of the locales appeared on the Dark Shadows series as well. Some interior scenes were shot at the Lockwood–Mathews Mansion in Norwalk, Connecticut, as well as the former Three Bears Inn on Route 33 in Westport. Along with the original cast, Dan Curtis added other actors to the cast: Jerry Lacy, who notably played Reverend Trask in the 1795 storyline; Terry Crawford and Michael Stroka, who first appeared in the Dark Shadows 1897 storyline; Don Briscoe, who played cursed brothers Chris and Tom Jennings; Dennis Patrick, who played Paul Stoddard and Jason McGuire; and George DiCenzo, who did more behind-the-scenes work on the last two years of the show.

The TV series was still in production while the film was being made. Some characters had to be temporarily written out of the show so that the actors would be available to appear in the movie. Barnabas (Jonathan Frid), for example, was trapped in his coffin on the TV show by failed writer William Loomis (John Karlen) who wanted to use the vampire's life story as the basis for a novel. Kathryn Leigh Scott was absent from 30 episodes (986 to 1015); Jonathan Frid was absent from 28 episodes (983 to 1010); Grayson Hall was absent from 21 episodes (986 to 1006); John Karlen was absent from 21 episodes (990 to 1010); Nancy Barrett was absent from 20 episodes (991 to 1010): Louis Edmonds was absent from 17 episodes (991 to 1008); Don Briscoe was absent from 15 episodes (986 to 1000); Joan Bennett was absent from 15 episodes (991 to 1006); and David Henesy was absent from 9 episodes (993 to 1001).

== Release ==
The film was released at the height of the TV show's popularity to great commercial success.

The preview version of the film (shown August 24, 1970 at New York City's DeMille Theatre on 47th Street) included a scene where young David Collins (Henesy) pretends to hang himself. It was removed because there were concerns some children might "try this at home." No copies of this footage are known to exist. Another scene that was shown in some theaters has Jeff Clark (Roger Davis) testing out the crossbow before pursuing Barnabas. This one showing earned the film $30,000.

=== Home media ===
House of Dark Shadows has been released on VHS, and as a two-sided laserdisc (the laserdisc packaged with Night of Dark Shadows).

Warner Home Video released House of Dark Shadows alongside Night of Dark Shadows on DVD and Blu-ray on October 30, 2012.

=== Novelization ===
A paperback novelization of the film by Marilyn Ross (who had written a series of novels based on the TV show) was published in October 1970. The novel is based on the original script, and contains some scenes which were either cut from the movie or were never filmed.

== Sequel ==
The second film was originally supposed to bring back Barnabas, and was to be called Curse of Dark Shadows (according to Famous Monsters of Filmland). Before pre-production could begin, however, the series had gone off the air, and Jonathan Frid, fearing being typecast as Barnabas, declined to return. Instead, Night of Dark Shadows was made, focusing on Collinwood after new heir Quentin Collins (David Selby) takes over. Elizabeth Collins Stoddard (played by Joan Bennett in the series and the first film) gets a brief mention in the film, but is not present.

== See also ==
- List of American films of 1970
- Dark Shadows (film)
- Vampire film

== Bibliography ==
- The Dark Shadows Companion: 25th Anniversary Collection, edited by Kathryn Leigh Scott, Pomegranate Press Ltd., 1990, ISBN 0-938817-25-6
- Dark Shadows Memories: 35th Anniversary, by Kathryn Leigh Scott, Pomegranate Press Ltd., 2001, ISBN 0-938817-60-4
- The Dark Shadows Movie Book: Producer/director Dan Curtis' original shooting scripts from House of Dark Shadows and Night of Dark Shadows, edited by Kathryn Leigh Scott and Jim Pierson, Pomegranate Press Ltd., 1998, ISBN 0-938817-48-5
