= Night of Dark Shadows =

1971 film by Dan Curtis

- Film poster by John Solie
- Directed by: Dan Curtis
- Written by: Dan Curtis; Sam Hall
- Based on: Dark Shadows (1966 TV series) by Dan Curtis
- Produced by: Dan Curtis
- Starring: David Selby; Grayson Hall; John Karlen; Nancy Barrett; Lara Parker; James Storm; Thayer David; Christopher Pennock; Diana Millay; Kate Jackson
- Cinematography: Richard Shore
- Edited by: Charles Goldsmith
- Music by: Robert Cobert
- Production companies: Dan Curtis Productions; Metro-Goldwyn-Mayer
- Distributed by: Metro-Goldwyn-Mayer
- Release date: August 4, 1971
- Running time: 94 minutes
- Country: United States
- Language: English
- Budget: $900,000
- Box office: $1,400,000

Night of Dark Shadows is a 1971 American gothic horror film co-written, directed and produced by Dan Curtis. It is the second film based on Curtis' Dark Shadows television series, following the previous year's House of Dark Shadows. Like its predecessor, the film adapts a storyline from the then-ongoing series. It centers on the story of Quentin Collins (David Selby) and his bride Tracy (Kate Jackson) at the Collinwood Mansion, and the ghostly witch Angelique Collins (Lara Parker). John Karlen, Grayson Hall, and Nancy Barrett also star.

This film marked the feature film debuts of David Selby and Kate Jackson. It was released by MGM on August 5, 1971. It failed to capture the success of its predecessor.

== Plot ==
Handsome young artist Quentin Collins arrives at his newly inherited estate of Collinwood with his beautiful wife Tracy. They meet the housekeeper Carlotta Drake and the caretaker Gerard Stiles. Quentin happens upon a 19th-century portrait of a blonde woman with captivating green eyes that seem to mesmerize him. Carlotta informs him that the woman is Angelique Collins, who had lived there over 100 years earlier. The Collins' friends Alex and Claire Jenkins, who have co-written several successful horror novels, move into a cottage on the estate.

Quentin soon begins to be troubled by startling visions and haunting dreams about one of his ancestors, Charles Collins, and his ancestor's mistress Angelique—who had been hanged as a witch in a past century. Carlotta eventually reveals to Quentin that she is the reincarnation of Sarah Castle, a little girl who had lived at Collinwood over 150 years ago, and that Quentin himself is the reincarnation of Charles Collins. Charles had had an affair with Angelique, wife of his brother Gabriel, resulting in her being hanged—and Charles being sealed alive in the family crypt with Angelique's corpse.

On a trip to New York, the Jenkinses discover a painting of Charles Collins, which bears an uncanny resemblance to Quentin. Convinced that their friends are in grave danger, the couple hurry home to Collinwood, where they are attacked by the ghost of Angelique.

Meanwhile, Quentin has become possessed by the spirit of Charles Collins, and attempts to drown Tracy in a disused swimming pool on the estate. Alex and Claire arrive in time to revive her, but Quentin, having no memory of his actions, refuses to believe their wild tale.

Carlotta and Gerard conspire to eliminate Quentin's loved ones. Quentin, seeing the scratches on his wrist where Tracy had tried to fend him off, realizes the truth of Alex's warning and rushes to rescue his friends. Gerard has managed to take Tracy prisoner (despite his having been shot in the face by Claire), and Quentin fights with him high atop a train trestle. As Gerard slashes Quentin's cheek with a knife, creating a gash in his left cheek that looks remarkably like the one Charles Collins had, Tracy rushes to try to save her husband. She strikes Gerard with a nearby plank, knocking him off Quentin and onto the edge of the trestle. He teeters on the edge for a moment, then plunges to his death after Tracy pushes him.

The group rush back to Collinwood to confront Carlotta. As they arrive, she jumps from the top of the house when she sees the ghostly Angelique beckon her from below.

In the end, the two couples prepare to leave Collinwood forever. Alex and Claire leave first, with Quentin and Tracy following. However, instead of driving away, Quentin returns to the house, saying he intends to retrieve some canvases. When he fails to come back, Tracy follows, only to find him now completely possessed by Charles Collins. Angelique enters the room, reborn in the flesh. The camera freezes on Tracy's face as she begins to scream, as Quentin and Angelique advance on her. A UPI news wire shown at the end reveals that Alex and Claire Jenkins have been killed in a car accident. Witnesses reported seeing a ghostly fog filling the car as it veered off the road.

== Cast ==
- David Selby as Quentin Collins / Charles Collins
- Grayson Hall as Carlotta Drake
- John Karlen as Alex Jenkins
- Nancy Barrett as Claire Jenkins
- Lara Parker as Angelique Collins
- Kate Jackson as Tracy Collins
- James Storm as Gerard Stiles
- Diana Millay as Laura Collins
- Christopher Pennock as Gabriel Collins
- Thayer David as Reverend Strack
- Monica Rich as Sarah Castle
- Clarice Blackburn as Mrs. Castle

== Production ==
After the success of House of Dark Shadows (the 1970 feature film version of Dan Curtis's gothic soap opera Dark Shadows), MGM was ready to back a follow-up film in 1971. Curtis originally wanted to do a direct sequel and revive the vampire Barnabas Collins. Actor Jonathan Frid, however, refused to play the role again for fear of being typecast. Rather than recast the role, Curtis worked with writer Sam Hall to concoct an all-new storyline.

On March 29, 1971, filming began on Curse of Dark Shadows, later retitled Night of Dark Shadows. Without the headaches of producing the television series concurrently, the production crew was able to achieve a far more polished product than that of the previous year. In order to give the production some authenticity, spiritualist Hans Holzer was employed as an advisor to the production, though his actual contribution to the finished product proved minimal.

The story centered on the show's other popular male lead, Quentin Collins, played by David Selby. Night of Dark Shadows was shot in six weeks on a budget of $900,000 and released in 1971, after the show had left the air. Much of the film was shot at Lyndhurst Estate near Tarrytown, New York.

=== Deleted scenes ===
When filming completed without major problems, Curtis set about editing the film, which proved far denser and more complex than House of Dark Shadows. One reason often cited for the film's lack of performance is that MGM forced Curtis to cut over 35 minutes from his finished film, and gave him only 24 hours to do the job. Thus, the film went from approximately 129 minutes to about 94 minutes. Selby commented that the shorter version "didn't fulfill Dan [Curtis]'s vision", though he still felt it was an overall good movie.

Much of the excised footage was recovered in 1999, but was without sound. Later, according to restorationist Darren Gross, the rest of the missing footage and some of the missing sound elements were located (26 minutes had to be relooped by the original actors and have new foley effects added). This material consists of 16 sequences which extend existing scenes. Highlights of the discovery include flashback between the doomed lovers Charles Collins (Selby) and Angelique Collins (Lara Parker), two new scenes featuring menacing groundskeeper Gerard Stiles (James Storm), several romantic interludes between Quentin and Tracy Collins (Kate Jackson), a candlelit "exorcism" sequence in the gallery (the film's original climax), and the "hanging" sequence.

== Release ==
=== Home media ===
Night of Dark Shadows and House of Dark Shadows were released on VHS on September 1, 1998, and on DVD and Blu-ray on October 30, 2012 by Warner Home Video. Unusually, these releases retain their original GP rating instead of its modern equivalent PG.

== Reception ==
=== Critical response ===
Night of Dark Shadows received mostly negative reviews. In the Chicago Sun-Times, critic Roger Ebert gave the film 1 (out of 4) stars, writing: "Night of Dark Shadows seems designed primarily to turn a quick buck on the corpse of the late TV serial, and it doesn't even have fun doing that."

== See also ==
- List of American films of 1971
