= Lara Parker =

American actress (1938–2023)

- Parker in 1973
- Born: Mary Lamar Rickey; October 27, 1938; Knoxville, Tennessee, U.S.
- Died: October 12, 2023 (aged 84); Los Angeles, California, U.S.
- Education: Rhodes College; University of Iowa
- Occupations: Actress, author, educator
- Years active: 1967–2023
- Spouses: Tom Parker (m. 1959; div. 1974) Jim Hawkins (m. 1980)
- Children: 3

Mary Lamar Rickey (October 27, 1938 – October 12, 2023), better known as Lara Parker, was an American actress and writer known for her role as the witch Angelique Bouchard Collins on the ABC-TV serial Dark Shadows, which aired from 1966 to 1971.

== Early life ==
Lara Parker was born in Knoxville, Tennessee, on October 27, 1938, and grew up in Memphis. Descendant of a prominent Southern family, she was a great-great-granddaughter of Lucius Quintus Cincinnatus Lamar II and a third-great-granddaughter of Augustus Baldwin Longstreet, an uncle of Confederate General James Longstreet. She began a philosophy A.B. at Vassar College before receiving her Bachelor of Arts degree from Rhodes College (then known as Southwestern Presbyterian) and a Master of Arts degree in speech and drama from the University of Iowa.

== Career ==
Parker's best known role was as the witch Angelique Bouchard Collins on the supernatural soap opera Dark Shadows from 1966 to 1971. She later played the role of Laura Banner in the opening sequence of the pilot for the television series The Incredible Hulk (1977), and the fashion model-witch Madelaine in the Kolchak: The Night Stalker episode "The Trevi Collection".

Her other television work includes appearances on the Emergency fifth season episode "One of Those Days" (1975), Kung Fu, The Six Million Dollar Man second season episode "The Deadly Replay" (1974), Police Woman, Kojak, Alice, Quincy, M.E., Hawaii Five-O, The Rockford Files, Highway to Heaven, Switch, Baretta, Galactica 1980 ("The Night The Cylons Landed", Parts I & II), the Barnaby Jones episode "The Price of Anger" (1980), the CBS daytime serial Capitol, and the ABC daytime serial One Life to Live. She played secretary Wanda in the 1977 television miniseries Washington: Behind Closed Doors and had a recurring role in the short-lived television series Jessica Novak.

In 1971, Parker reprised the role of Angelique in Night of Dark Shadows, the second feature film based on Dark Shadows. She was joined by her Dark Shadows castmates Kate Jackson, David Selby, Grayson Hall, Nancy Barrett, John Karlen, and Thayer David. This film was more loosely based on the series than House of Dark Shadows was the year before and it did not fare as well at the box office as the first film. She appeared opposite Robert De Niro in the 1970 Brian De Palma film Hi, Mom!, but her best known film role came in the Academy Award-winning drama Save the Tiger (1973), starring Jack Lemmon, in which she played Margo, a sympathetic prostitute who is devastated when her client Fred Mirrell (Norman Burton) suffers a near fatal heart attack. In 1975, she played Kelly Marsh, the wife of Peter Fonda's character Roger in Race with the Devil.

== Later work ==
Parker made her Broadway debut in 1968 in Woman Is My Idea, written and directed by Don C. Liljenquist. In 1969, she played the title role in an Off-Broadway production of Frank Wedekind's Lulu. She also appeared in the off-Broadway production of A Gun Play.

In 1998, Parker published a novel, Angelique's Descent. Its sequel, Dark Shadows: The Salem Branch, came out in July 2006, and Dark Shadows: Wolf Moon Rising was released in August 2013. Her fourth and final novel, Heiress of Collinwood was released in November 2016. She later reprised the role of Angelique for a new series of Dark Shadows audio dramas. She was also the reader of the unabridged audiobook recordings of her first three novels: Angelique's Descent, Dark Shadows: The Salem Branch and Dark Shadows: Wolf Moon Rising.

In 2012, Parker had a cameo role in Tim Burton's movie version of Dark Shadows. Later she was reunited with her Dark Shadows co-stars Jerry Lacy and Kathryn Leigh Scott in two feature films about Doctor Mabuse written and directed by Ansel Faraj. The first film Doctor Mabuse was released in 2013, followed by a 2014 sequel called Doctor Mabuse: Etiopomar. Her final film, The Great Nick D (shot in 2023), is co-written and co-directed by Ansel Faraj and Nathan Wilson and co-stars her Dark Shadows co-stars Kathryn Leigh Scott and David Selby.

== Education and post-acting career ==
Parker attended Central High School in Memphis and won a scholarship to Vassar College. At Vassar, she began a major in philosophy, which she completed at Southwestern at Memphis (now Rhodes College), receiving her BA. She attended graduate school at the University of Iowa and completed all course work on a Masters in speech and drama. She was working on her thesis while beginning her acting career. After retiring from acting, Parker became a high school and English teacher and obtained her MFA in creative writing from Antioch University.

== Personal life and death ==
Parker was married to Jim Hawkins, a building contractor. They had a daughter, Caitlin. Parker had two sons, Rick and Andy, both from her first marriage to artist Tom Parker: Rick was a successful record producer, Andy a contractor. Caitlin Hawkins is a set designer and stylist for videos and commercials.

Parker's son Rick is married to singer Miranda Lee Richards.

On October 12, 2023, following a battle with cancer, Parker died in her sleep in Los Angeles at the age of 84.

== Works ==
- Angelique's Descent
- The Salem Branch
- Wolf Moon Rising
- Return to Collinwood (Introduction only)
- Dreams of the Dark (Introduction only)
- Heiress of Collinwood
