= Jim Storm (actor) =

American actor (born 1943)

- Born: James Storm; August 12, 1943 (age 82); Illinois, U.S.
- Occupation: Actor
- Years active: 1968–present
- Spouse: Valerie Pronio-Storm
- Relatives: Michael Storm (brother); John Steppling (cousin)

James Storm (born August 12, 1943) is an American actor who is best known for his role as Gerard Stiles on the 1960s horror soap opera Dark Shadows.

== Career ==
James Storm's first television appearance was as the second Dr. Larry Wolek on One Life to Live for which he replaced actor Paul Tulley. It was a role Storm played from 1968 to 1969. His brother, Michael, followed him in the role. He next portrayed Gerard Stiles on Dark Shadows from 1970 to 1971, appearing in 79 episodes. He played a different character with the same name in the 1971 spinoff film Night of Dark Shadows.

Storm's next soap role was on The Secret Storm starting in 1971, and then he moved on to The Doctors (1979), Texas (1980–1981), The Young and the Restless as Neil Fenmore (1983–1986), Capitol (1986), The Bold and the Beautiful as Bill Spencer (1987–1994) and Sunset Beach (1997–1998), with some returns to The Bold and the Beautiful in the 2000s.

In 2010, it was announced that Storm would be appearing in the audio mini-series Dark Shadows: Kingdom of the Dead.

== Personal life ==
Storm is the brother of Michael Storm and the elder cousin of playwright John Steppling. He is married to Valerie Pronio-Storm.

== Filmography ==
=== Film ===
Year	Title	Role	Notes
1971	Night of Dark Shadows	Gerard Stiles	
1977	Blue Sunshine	Tommy	
1983	Without a Trace	Reporter	
2001	Firetrap	Jack Calloway	
2001	Venomous	Sheriff Jack Crowley	
2007	Dark Mirror	Frank	
2008	Chain Link	Duncan	
2009	Sex Drugs Guns	Scott Farber	
2011	Dispatch	Charlie	
2013	Blood of Redemption	Senator Roswald	
2013	Spanners	Herodotus	
2014	Falcon Song	Jabez	
2015	Benjamin Troubles	Mason Ramsay	
2016	The Veil	Gatekeeper	
2016	The American Gandhi	Brad	
2017	The Monster Project	Richard	
2018	4/20 Massacre	Rick	
2022	Vice & Virtue	Virtue	
TBA	Demon Lake	Sheriff Bo	

=== Television ===
Year	Title	Role	Notes
1970–1971	Dark Shadows	Gerard Stiles	81 episodes
1973	The Invasion of Carol Enders	Man who attacks Carol	Television film
1974	Kung Fu	Joe Billy	Episode: "Empty Pages of a Dead Book"
1974	Scream of the Wolf	Boy	Television film
1974	Murder in the First Person Singular	Savage Hawk	Television film
1974	Planet of the Apes	Romar	Episode: "Tomorrow's Tide"
1975	Trilogy of Terror	Eddie Nells	Television film
1975	The Kansas City Massacre	Larry De Vol	Television film
1976	Barnaby Jones	Resident	Episode: "The Fatal Dive"
1976	Police Woman	Minister	Episode: "The Lifeline Agency"
1977	The Rockford Files	Officer	Episode: "Sticks and Stones May Break Your Bones, But Waterbury Will Bury You"
1977	Dog and Cat	Change Maker	Episode: "Pilot"
1977	The Amazing Spider-Man	Group Member	Episode: "Spider-Man"
1977	It Happened at Lakewood Manor	Attendant	Television film
1979–1980	The Doctors	Dr. Michael Powers	143 episodes
1980	Farewell to the Planet of the Apes	Romar	Television film
1981	Texas	Jack Brent	3 episodes
1983	Hardcastle and McCormick	Patrick Sheldon	Episode: "Hotshoes"
1983	Automan	Driver	Episode: "Staying Alive While Running a High Flashdance Fever"
1983–1984	The Young and the Restless	Neil Fenmore	3 episodes
1983, 1986	St. Elsewhere	Dr. Oliver George	2 episodes
1986	Blacke's Magic	David Barr	Episode: "Breathing Room (Pilot)"
1987	Hotel	Dan Kates	Episode: "Unfinished Business"
1987–2009	The Bold and the Beautiful	Bill Spencer	460 episodes
1997–1998	Sunset Beach	Charles Lakin	13 episodes
2006	Freddie	Frank	Episode: "The Search for Grandpa Four"
2007	Bone Eater	Dick Krantz	Television film
2009	When Actors Need Money	Jim Storm	Television film
2012	ATSN: Stop the Threat	Lawyer / Office Worker	Episode: "The Office
2014	Fatal Acquittal	Tony	Television film
2021	A Dark Shadows Christmas Carol	Bob Cratchit	Television film
