= Grayson Hall =

American actress (1922–1985)

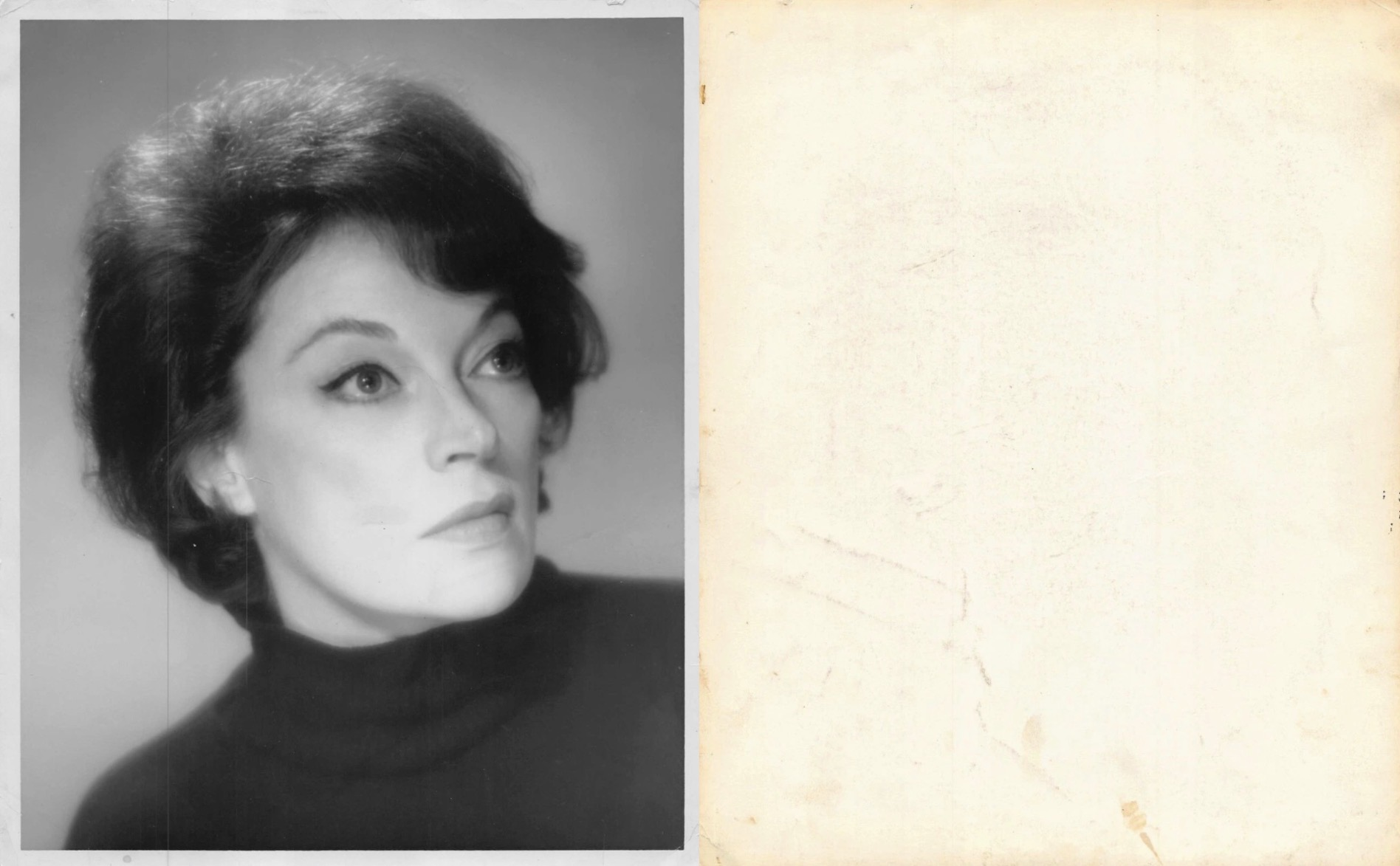
- Hall in 1964
- Born: Shirley Grossman; September 18, 1922; Philadelphia, Pennsylvania, U.S.
- Died: August 7, 1985 (aged 62); New York City, New York, U.S.
- Other name: Shirley Grayson
- Occupation: Actress
- Years active: 1950s–1985
- Height: 5 ft 6 in (168 cm)
- Spouses: Bradbart "Ted" Brooks (m. 1946; div. 1949) Sam Hall (m. 1952–1985)
- Children: 1

Grayson Hall (born Shirley Grossman; September 18, 1922 – August 7, 1985) was an American actress. She was widely regarded for her avant-garde theatrical performances from the 1960s to the 1980s, and was known to television audiences for playing multiple prominent roles on the gothic soap opera Dark Shadows (1966–71). She was nominated for an Academy Award for Best Supporting Actress and a Golden Globe in the same category for her performance in the John Huston film The Night of the Iguana (1964).

== Early life ==
Grayson Hall was born Shirley Grossman in Philadelphia in 1922, the only child of Eleanor and Joseph Grossman. Her father was from Latvia and her mother, who had acted in the Yiddish theatre, was from South Africa. Both were from Jewish immigrant families.

When Hall was eight, her parents separated, but they never divorced. Hall became interested in acting as an escape from a painful childhood, and auditioned for plays in New York City while still attending Simon Gratz High School in North Philadelphia. She enrolled at Temple University but did not matriculate. She landed her first professional job with a summer stock company on Long Island in 1942.

== Career ==
Hall enjoyed an active stage career in New York City. Her theater credits include roles in off-Broadway productions of influential avant-garde plays including Six Characters in Search of an Author by Luigi Pirandello (Phoenix Theatre, 1955). She also appeared as the madam Irma in the first New York production of The Balcony by Jean Genet for more than a year at the Circle in the Square Theatre Downtown in Greenwich Village.

Having guest-starred on various television programs during the mid-1950s, Hall made her film debut in 1961 in Run Across the River. She also appeared in Satan in High Heels as Pepe, a cabaret club owner, but she later disavowed the film.

In September 1963, Hall traveled to Puerto Vallarta, Mexico to play the role of Judith Fellowes in John Huston's film version of The Night of the Iguana, based on the original play by Tennessee Williams. She was nominated for an Academy Award in the category of Best Supporting Actress at the 37th Academy Awards for her performance.

Hall portrayed Margaret Miller, a kidnapped bank teller in Walt Disney Productions' That Darn Cat! in 1965. She appeared on "The Pieces of Fate Affair", an episode of The Man from U.N.C.L.E. in 1967.

=== Dark Shadows ===
Hall's best-known television role was as Dr. Julia Hoffman on Dark Shadows. She portrayed the loyal confidant and friend of the vampire Barnabas Collins (Jonathan Frid). Other key roles that she played on the show were those of Countess Natalie du Pres; Magda Rakosi, a Gypsy; Hoffman, a Mrs. Danvers–type housekeeper; Julia Collins; and Constance Collins, sister of Brutus Collins (Louis Edmonds). She also appeared in both Dark Shadows feature films: in House of Dark Shadows (1970) again as Dr. Julia Hoffman, and in Night of Dark Shadows (1971) as a new character, housekeeper Carlotta Drake.

=== Later career ===
After Dark Shadows ended, Hall portrayed reporter Marge Grey on All My Children for a short period in 1973. She continued acting on stage in Jean Genet's The Screens (1971–72) and in Happy End (1977) with Meryl Streep and Christopher Lloyd.

In the 1970s, Hall appeared on several television films, including Gargoyles (ABC), filmed in New Mexico with Cornel Wilde, and the Dan Curtis television film The Great Ice Rip-Off (ABC) with Lee J. Cobb and Gig Young. She starred in the mystery film The Two Deaths of Sean Doolittle (ABC), which was written by her husband Sam Hall.

Hall appeared in the Broadway premiere of The Suicide (1980) with Derek Jacobi and appeared opposite Geraldine Page, Carrie Nye and Madeleine Sherwood in an off-Broadway revival of The Madwoman of Chaillot.

Her last onscreen role was as Delilah Ralston (Shelly Burch)'s scheming mother Euphemia Ralston on the soap opera One Life to Live from July 1982 until April 1983.

== Personal life and death ==
On January 14, 1946, she married fellow actor Theodore Ralph Brooks (birthname Bradburd) in New York. The couple relocated to Los Angeles but separated in 1949 and she returned to New York. In 1952, she married writer Sam Hall. Their son Matthew was born in 1958. She had always used the stage name Shirley Grayson, but Sam Hall called her Grayson "like an old Army buddy," as she said in an interview. She eventually adopted Grayson Hall as her professional name.

After suffering from lung cancer for six months, Hall died at New York Hospital in Manhattan in 1985 at the age of 62, only six weeks before her 63rd birthday. A simple marker near her Rhinebeck, New York, home reads "Grayson Hall—August 7, 1985."

In 2006, a biography titled Grayson Hall: A Hard Act to Follow was released.

== Filmography ==
=== Film ===
	Title	Role	Notes
1961	Run Across the River		Credited as Shirley Grayson
1962	Satan in High Heels	Pepe	
1964	The Parisienne and the Prudes	Decorator	
1964	The Night of the Iguana	Judith Fellowes	
1965	That Darn Cat!	Margaret Miller	
1966	Who Are You, Polly Maggoo?	Miss Maxwell	
1970	End of the Road	Peggy Rankin	
1970	House of Dark Shadows	Dr. Julia Hoffman	
1970	Adam at Six A.M.	Inez Treadly	
1971	Night of Dark Shadows	Carlotta Drake	
1975	Pick-up		Voice, uncredited

=== Television ===
	Title	Role	Notes
1951	Lights Out	Laura Holloway	Episode: "For Release Today"; Credited as Shirley Grayson
1954	The Philco Television Playhouse		Episode: "Friday the Thirteenth"; Credited as Shirley Grayson
1954	Kraft Television Theater		Episode: "Charm Bracelet"; Credited as Shirley Grayson
1955	Robert Montgomery Presents		Episode: "A Dream of Summer"; Credited as Shirley Grayson
1955	Goodyear Television Playhouse	Sylvia Baker	Episode: "The Way Things Happen"; Credited as Shirley Grayson
1955	Justice		Episode: "Shadow of Terror"; Credited as Shirley Grayson
1955	Danger		Episode: "The Operator"; Credited as Shirley Grayson
1955	Star Tonight		Episode: "The Critic"; Credited as Shirley Grayson
1956	Omnibus	Narrator	Episode: "Something About the Sky"; Credited as Shirley Grayson
1957	Modern Romances		Episodes: "The Real Thing", "The Misguided Man", Parts 1-6; Credited as Shirley Grayson
1958	True Story		Episode: "The Scent of Roses"; Credited as Shirley Grayson
1959-1961	The United States Steel Hour	Secretary	Episodes: "Wish on the Moon"; Credited as Shirley Grayson "The Mating Machine"
1964	Route 66	Mrs. Reston	Episode: "Follow the White Dove with the Broken Wing"
1965	Bob Hope Presents the Chrysler Theatre	Miss Fitzhugh	Episode: "Back to Back"
1966	The Trials of O'Brien	Louise Malcolm	Episode: "A Horse Called Destiny"
1967	The Man from U.N.C.L.E.	Judy Merril	Episode: "The Pieces of Fate Affair"
1967	The Girl from U.N.C.L.E.	Mrs. Fowler	Episode: "The High and the Deadly Affair"
1967–71	Dark Shadows	Dr. Julia Hoffman; Natalie du Pres; Magda Rakosi; Julia Hoffman (PT); Julia Collins; Constance Collins	474 episodes
1970	Night Gallery	Ann Brigham	Episode: "The House/Certain Shadows on the Wall"
1972	Gargoyles	Mrs. Parks	Television film
1973	All My Children	Marge Grey	
1974	Kojak	Mrs. Campbell	Episode: "Hush Now, Don't You Die"
1974	The Great Ice Rip-Off	Helen Calso	Television film
1975	The Wide World of Mystery	Rhea	Episode: "The Two Deaths of Sean Doolittle"
1982	CBS Library	Mrs. Mahoney (segment "The Chaparral Prince")	Episode: "Robbers, Rooftops, and Witches"
1982–83	One Life to Live	Euphemia Ralston	

== Awards and nominations ==
Award	Year	Category	Work	Result
Academy Awards	1965	Best Supporting Actress	The Night of the Iguana	Nominated
Golden Globe Awards	1965	Best Supporting Actress – Motion Picture	The Night of the Iguana	Nominated
