= Don Briscoe =

American actor

- Born: Cecil Donald Briscoe; March 20, 1940; Yalobusha County, Mississippi, U.S.
- Died: October 31, 2004 (aged 64); Memphis, Tennessee, U.S.
- Other name: Donald Briscoe
- Education: Columbia University
- Occupation: Actor
- Years active: 1952–1980

Cecil Donald Briscoe (March 20, 1940 – October 31, 2004) was an American stage and soap opera actor known for starring in the TV series Dark Shadows.

== Early life and education ==
Don Briscoe was born on March 20, 1940, in Scobey, Mississippi. He grew up in a middle-class family, where his father worked as a service manager for Firestone, and his mother worked in admissions at the old City of Memphis Hospital. He earned a scholarship to attend Phillips Exeter Academy and aspired to attend MIT to study astrophysics. He graduated in 1958 and considered either acting or astrophysics, having developed an interest in acting at Phillips Exeter Academy. He received his bachelor's degree from Columbia College in 1962. He received his master's degree in English literature from Columbia Graduate School of Arts and Sciences in 1965. While at Columbia University, he and future Dark Shadows co-star Roger Davis were classmates and acted in the Columbia Players, then headed by their classmate and future director Brian De Palma.

== Career ==
Briscoe's early acting credits include New York stage appearances in Come Back Little Sheba, The Tavern, and Friends and Romans. He played Tony Merritt #2 on Days of Our Lives in 1966. He also made a guest appearance during the second season of I Dream of Jeannie, which aired on March 20, 1967. He played an officer in the episode "A Secretary is Not a Toy."

In 1968, Briscoe joined the cast of the Gothic soap opera Dark Shadows, playing Chris Jennings, Tom Jennings, Timothy Shaw, and Chris Collins. His sexy, brooding good looks made him an instant favorite among fans, and he became the subject of countless fan magazine photos and articles. before leaving the show in 1970.

Briscoe appeared in the 1970 film House of Dark Shadows as Todd Blake, the fiancee of Carolyn Stoddard (Nancy Barrett) and the target of her vampire attacks. After appearing in the MGM film, Briscoe abruptly left Dark Shadows and left acting, suffering from bipolar disorder.

== Personal life ==
After leaving Dark Shadows, Briscoe's sister Bonny said he "suffered something of a mental breakdown...He kind of began criss-crossing the country, working in California some and back in New York...He got into the drug culture very heavily in California...which was unfortunate." Briscoe moved back to Memphis, Tennessee to live with his parents. He continued to act in local productions, such as in a performance of Hamlet in 1980. He also worked as a gas station attendant for a stint. Over time, Briscoe became more of a recluse, and a psychiatrist eventually ruled he was unable to hold a regular job. He lived off of disability and residual checks. In the 1990s, fans reached out to Briscoe and he admitted he wanted nothing to do with his past celebrity life. Briscoe's mom died in 1999, and his father died in 2004. A few days before Halloween, his sister Bonny tried to contact him to no avail. She went to check on him on October 31, 2004 and found Briscoe had died at his home from heart disease.
