= Diana Millay =

American actress (1934–2021)

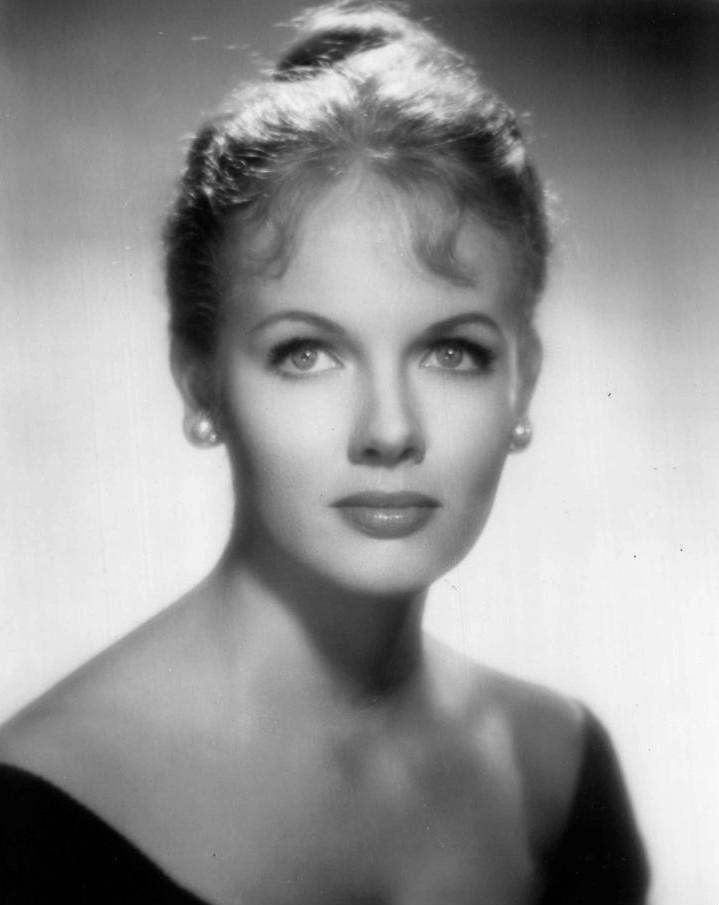
- Millay in 1960
- Born: Diana Claire Millay; June 7, 1934; Rye, New York, U.S.
- Died: January 8, 2021 (aged 86); New York, U.S.
- Resting place: Green-Wood Cemetery
- Occupations: Actress, writer
- Years active: 1955–1971
- Spouse: Geoffrey Jones (m. 1966; div. 1968)
- Children: 1

Diana Claire Millay (June 7, 1934 – January 8, 2021) was an American actress and writer. She primarily worked in television, guest starring in nearly 100 prime time shows, and played continuing roles on two daytime soap operas, Dark Shadows and The Secret Storm.

== Career ==
Diana Millay was born in Rye, New York, and started her career as a model, first as a child for the Montgomery Ward catalogue, and later as a top Conover model for John Robert Powers.

Every year during high school summer vacation, she appeared in summer stock productions, playing leading or featured roles in classic stage plays such as Our Hearts Were Young and Gay; The Girl on the Via Flaminia; Come Back, Little Sheba; Time of the Cuckoo; The Seven Year Itch; Ladies in Retirement; Bell, Book and Candle; Time Out for Ginger; Picnic; The Little Foxes; Tobacco Road; and Life With Father. In total, she appeared in seven seasons of summer stock.

=== Broadway ===
In 1957, Broadway came calling and Millay starred opposite Sam Levene and Ellen Burstyn in Fair Game. Her subsequent Broadway appearances include Drink to Me Only opposite Tom Poston, Roger the Sixth opposite Alan Alda, The Glass Rooster opposite Michael Allinson and Boeing Boeing opposite Ian Carmichael. In addition, she spent a year touring the United States and Canada opposite Eddie Bracken in The Seven Year Itch.

Millay's first film role was in the 1957 United Artists movie Street of Sinners, opposite George Montgomery.

=== Television ===
Her television debut came in "Taste", an episode of the anthology series Star Tonight. After that, one of Millay's early roles on television was being the timekeeper on Masquerade Party in 1956. She continued to appear in other "live" productions such as Robert Montgomery Presents, Kraft Television Theatre, Studio One, The United States Steel Hour, Omnibus, Pond's Theater, The Philco Television Playhouse, Playhouse 90, and many others. She made three guest appearances on the CBS courtroom drama series Perry Mason, starring Raymond Burr. In 1961, she played Debra Bradford in "The Case of the Resolute Reformer," and title character and defendant Sue Ellen Frazer in "The Case of the Unwelcome Bride." In 1963, she played murder victim Eula Johnson in "The Case of the Bouncing Boomerang".

Millay's filmed television credits include guest star roles on most of the major shows that were running during the late 1950s and throughout the 1960s, including Stagecoach West, Father Knows Best, The Tab Hunter Show, My Three Sons, The Americans, Gunsmoke (as title character in the sixth season episode "Melinda Miles" in 1957), Bonanza, The Virginian, Arrest and Trial, 77 Sunset Strip, Rawhide, Tales of Wells Fargo, Wagon Train, Laramie, Route 66, Hawaiian Eye, The Rifleman, Thriller, Maverick (in the episode "Dodge City or Bust" with Jack Kelly and a brief appearance by Roger Moore), The Life and Legend of Wyatt Earp, Dobie Gillis, Sam Peckinpah's The Westerner, and The Man from U.N.C.L.E.. Millay made three television pilots for prospective new television series, Slezak and Son, Boston Terrier, and Las Vegas Beat.

In 1962, Millay was chosen as "Miss Emmy" because of her extensive appearances on primetime TV shows.

=== Dark Shadows ===
After completing Paramount's Tarzan and the Great River opposite Mike Henry and Jan Murray that was shot in Brazil, executive producer Dan Curtis offered Millay the contract role of Laura Collins on his ABC-TV daytime series, the cult classic Dark Shadows in November 1966. She went on to appear in sixty-two episodes, and became the show's first supernatural character, playing an immortal phoenix-woman who is burned in a fire and reborn to spend another century on Earth. After her present-day incarnation was again consumed in a fire, she returned during the flashback story that took place in the 19th century, as yet another reincarnation of Laura Collins. She appeared in a feature film inspired by the series, MGM's 1971 Night of Dark Shadows opposite David Selby.

In 1970, Millay was offered a daytime role as Kitty Styles on the CBS soap The Secret Storm. Her run on this show gave her the opportunity to work once again with former Dark Shadows alumni Robert Costello, who was a producer on both shows, and Joel Crothers who played Joe Haskell on Dark Shadows and Ken Stevens on The Secret Storm.

== Books ==
Millay's interests shifted from acting to writing and she published several books, including I'd Rather Eat Than Act, The Power of Halloween, and How to Create Good Luck.

== Personal life ==
Millay was married to Broadway producer Geoffrey Jones, but they separated shortly after the birth of their son, Kiley Christopher.

Millay died in 2021, at the age of 86.
