= Michael Stroka =

American actor (1938–1997)

- Born: Michael George Stroka; May 9, 1938; Passaic, New Jersey, U.S.
- Died: April 14, 1997 (aged 58); Los Angeles, California, U.S.
- Other name: Mike Stroka
- Occupations: Stage and television actor
- Years active: 1964–1990
- Spouse: Karen Jensen (1990-1997)

Michael George Stroka (May 9, 1938 – April 14, 1997) was an American actor on soap operas including ABC-TV's Dark Shadows, in which he played Aristede, Bruno Hess, and Laszlo Ferrari from 1969 to 1970.

== Career ==
Michael Stroka was best known for his roles on the ABC supernatural soap opera Dark Shadows from 1969 to 1970 where he played the characters Aristede, Bruno Hess and Laszlo Ferrari. He made a cameo appearance as a pallbearer in MGM's House of Dark Shadows (1970), the first of two feature films based on the series. He also appeared in 1965 on Combat!, in two episodes.

From 1975 to 1976, Stroka appeared as Dr. Quentin Henderson on The Edge of Night. He also guest-starred on Wonder Woman in the episode "The Deadly Dolphin" and in the Buck Rogers in the 25th Century episode "Journey to Oasis".

== Personal life ==
Stroka was the son of Slovak immigrants, and was born in Passaic, New Jersey. Stroka was Byzantine Catholic, and a member of Saint Mary's Byzantine cathedral in Sherman Oaks.

Stroka married actress Karen Jensen in 1990. He died from kidney cancer in Los Angeles, California at age 58.

== Filmography ==
=== Film ===
Year	Title	Role	Notes
1964	36 Hours	German Soldier	Uncredited
1965	King Rat	Miller	
1970	House of Dark Shadows	Pallbearer	
1982	Island of Blood	Mayor	
1989	Harlem Nights	Detective Simms	
1990	The Closer	Board Member	

=== Television ===
Year	Title	Role	Notes
1965	Combat!	German Drunk #1 / Scope Man	2 episodes
1969–1970	Dark Shadows	Aristede / Bruno Hess / Laszlo Ferrari	64 episodes
1975–1976	The Edge of Night	Dr. Quentin Henderson	3 episodes
1977	Contract on Cherry Street	Mike Farren	Television film
1978	Wonder Woman	Henry	Episode: "The Deadly Dolphin"
1978	The Next Step Beyond	Donk / Logan	Episode: "Ghost Town"
1981	Buck Rogers in the 25th Century	Rolla	Episode: "Journey to Oasis"
