= John Karlen =

American actor (1933–2020)

- Karlen in Quincy, M.E., 1979
- Born: John Adam Karlewicz; May 28, 1933; New York City, New York, U.S.
- Died: January 22, 2020 (aged 86); Burbank, California, U.S.
- Education: American Academy of Dramatic Arts
- Occupation: Actor
- Years active: 1949–2016
- Spouse: Betty Karlen (m. 1963; div. 1998)
- Children: 1

John Karlen (born John Adam Karlewicz; May 28, 1933 – January 22, 2020) was an American actor. He was best known for his multiple roles on the gothic soap opera Dark Shadows from 1967 to 1971, most notably as Willie Loomis, and as Harvey Lacey on the crime drama television series Cagney & Lacey (1982–88). He won a Primetime Emmy Award in 1986 for the latter role.

== Early life and education ==
Karlen was born May 28, 1933, in Brooklyn, the son of Polish American parents Helen Agnes (née Balondowicz) and Adam Marion Karlewicz. He served in the U.S. Army during the Korean War. He enrolled in the American Academy of Dramatic Arts on a scholarship.

== Career ==
Karlen's first acting experiences were on early television productions such as From These Roots and Kraft Television Theatre. His Broadway stage career began in 1959 in Sweet Bird of Youth.

He accumulated roles on both stage and television before winning one of his signature roles in 1967 in the daytime serial Dark Shadows. It was Karlen's pivotal character of Willie Loomis who released vampire Barnabas Collins from his coffin, setting off the events of the series. Karlen would stay with the television series for 182 episodes, playing various characters through 1971. In addition to Willie, he played Carl Collins, a parallel-universe William H. Loomis, Desmond Collins and Kendrick Young. In the 1971 film Night of Dark Shadows, he played Alex Jenkins along with other cast members from the Dark Shadows TV show.

While not appearing on Dark Shadows in the late sixties, he appeared on Love Is a Many Splendored Thing as Jock Porter and Hidden Faces as Sharkey Primrose. He reunited with his Dark Shadows co-stars for the 1970 House of Dark Shadows as Willie Loomis, and, in 1971, with Night of Dark Shadows as Alex Jenkins. From 2006 to 2019, Karlen reprised the role of Loomis for a series of Dark Shadows audio dramas produced by Big Finish Productions.

Karlen moved to a series of guest appearances on television productions, establishing himself in 1982 as Harvey Lacey Sr., husband of Tyne Daly's character Mary Beth Lacey on Cagney & Lacey. He appeared in 110 episodes over six years. Karlen won an Emmy Award for his portrayal of Harvey Lacey Sr. in 1986; he received 2 further nominations, in 1985 and 1987.

His career included numerous movie roles, during which he reprised the Harvey Lacey Sr. character in four Cagney and Lacey television movies: Cagney & Lacey: The Return in 1994, Cagney & Lacey: Together Again and Cagney & Lacey: The View Through the Glass Ceiling in 1995, and Cagney & Lacey: True Convictions in 1996.

== Personal life and death ==
In 1963, Karlen married acting teacher Betty Karlen. They divorced in 1998.

=== Death ===
Karlen died from heart failure in Burbank, California on January 22, 2020, at age 86.

== Filmography ==
Film
Year	Title	Role	Notes
1970	House of Dark Shadows	Willie Loomis	
1971	Daughters of Darkness	Stefan Chilton	
1971	Night of Dark Shadows	Alex Jenkins	
1976	A Small Town in Texas	Deputy Lenny Lutz	
1978	Killer's Delight	Danny	
1981	Pennies from Heaven	Detective	
1984	Racing with the Moon	Mr. Nash	
1984	Impulse	Bob Russell	
1984	Gimme an 'F'	"Bucky" Berkshire	
1986	Native Son	Boris Max	
1991	The Dark Wind	Jake West	
1993	Surf Ninjas	Mac	
2016	The Job Interview	The Applicant	Short film

Television
Year	Title	Role	Notes
1949	The Big Story	Andy Franks	"Theory and Practice"
1957	Kraft Television Theatre	Young Man	"Heroes Walk on Sand"
1959	Naked City	Chuck	"The Manhole"
1959	Armstrong Circle Theatre	Private First Class James Cook	"Thunder Over Berlin"
1962	The Detectives	Frankie	"Strangers in the House"
1962	The Gallant Men	Lieutenant Tyrell	"Signals for an End Run"
1963	Stoney Burke	Mickey	"Job"
1963	The Doctors	Danny "Danny Boy" Delaney	6 episodes
1963	Hallmark Hall of Fame	Ned	"The Patriots"
1964	East Side/West Side	Billy	"One Drink at a Time"
1964	Brenner	Ben Laney	"Laney's Boy"
1966	Hawk	John Polanski	"The Longleat Chronicles"
1967	N.Y.P.D.	Gary Doyle	"Murder for Infinity"
1967	Love Is a Many Splendored Thing	Jock Porter	"Episode #1.55"
1967–71	Dark Shadows	Willie Loomis; Carl Collins; William H. Loomis; Desmond Collins; Kendrick Young	182 episodes
1968	Hidden Faces	"Sharkey" Primrose	Unknown episodes
1971	Another World	Casey	18 episodes
1972	Night of Terror	Pete Manning	TV movie
1972	The Sixth Sense	Ed	"Through a Flame Darkly"
1972	The Mod Squad	Johnny Wexford	"Belinda, End of Little Miss Bubble Gum"
1973	Shirts and Skins	Herbie Bush	TV movie
1973	The Magician	Jim Russel	"The Vanishing Lady"
1973	Egan	Jack / Ida Deveaux	TV movie
1973	Wide World Mystery	Otto Roget	"Frankenstein: Part 1"
1973	Medical Center	Frank Crane	"Judgment"
1973	Police Story	Detective #1	"Slow Boy"
1973	Kojak	"Pinky"	"Web of Death"
1974	The Invasion of Carol Enders	David Hastings	TV movie
1974	Wide World Mystery	Frank Linwood	"Nightmare at 43 Hillcrest"
1974	Shazam!	Nick Roberts	"Thou Shalt Not Kill"
1974	Doc Elliot	Vincent Parker	"The Pharmacist"
1974	Melvin Purvis: G-Man	Tony Anthony Redecci	TV movie
1975	Medical Center	Danny Taggert	"No Hiding Place"
1975	Mannix	Hood #1	"Quartet for a Blunt Instrument"
1975	Delancey Street: The Crisis Within	Richard Copell	TV movie
1975	Trilogy of Terror	Mr. Anmar	TV movie
1975	The Kansas City Massacre	Sam Cowley	TV movie
1975	Police Story	"Rush"	"Incident in the Kill Zone"
1975	Joe Forrester	Mason	"The Witness"
1975	Mobile One	Mickey Scanlon	"The Boxer"
1975	The Streets of San Francisco	Vernon	"Poisoned Snow"
1976	The Picture of Dorian Gray	Alan Campbell	TV movie
1976	The Streets of San Francisco	Nat Reeves	"No Minor Vices"
1976	Serpico	Eddie Hibbard	"Rapid Fire"
1976	The Waltons	Reverend Ezekiel L. Henshaw	"The Baptism"
1976	Hawaii Five-O	Harris	"Anatomy of a Bribe"
1977	Police Story	Shep	"Prime Rib"
1977	Charlie's Angels	Leonard Chaffey	"Angel Baby"
1977	The Feather and Father Gang	Benton	"Welcome Home, Vince"
1977	ABC Weekend Special	Bill Leggett	"My Dear Uncle Sherlock"
1977	Hunter	Power Plant Worker	"Bluebird Is Back"
1977	All in the Family	Leo	"Mike Goes Skiing"
1977	Most Wanted	"Red" Murphy	"The White Collar Killer"
1978	Kojak	Hicks	"The Captain's Brother's Wife"
1978	Barnaby Jones	Johnny Alban	"A Frame for Murder"
1978	Barnaby Jones	Eddie "Easy Eddie"	"The Scapegoat"
1978	The Rockford Files	Leo	"Rosendahl and Gilda Stern Are Dead"
1978	Colorado C.I.	Kessler	TV movie
1978	The Hardy Boys/Nancy Drew Mysteries	Rocky	"The Lady on Thursday at Ten"
1979	The Last Ride of the Dalton Gang	Charlie Powers	TV movie
1979	Lou Grant	Ken Navaretti	"Gambling"
1979	Sword of Justice	Jerry Lombardi	"Blackjack"
1979	The Return of Mod Squad	Marty	TV movie
1979	Kaz	Fred	"The Battered Bride"
1979	Supertrain	Quinn	"Express to Terror"
1979	Starsky & Hutch	Stanton	"Ballad for a Blue Lady"
1979	Quincy, M.E.	Sergeant Alistair Adams	"Semper-Fidelis"
1979	Quincy, M.E.	Customs Agent Brice	"Hot Ice"
1979	Vega$	Eddie Stolvak	"The Day the Gambling Stopped"
1980	The Long Days of Summer	Duane Haley	TV movie
1981	Vega$	Geddes	"Out of Sight"
1981	Quincy, M.E.	Customs Agent Brice	"Dear Mummy"
1981	American Dream	Coach Ritter	"American Dream"
1981	Trapper John, M.D.	Marty	"A Case of the Crazies"
1982	Rosie: The Rosemary Clooney Story	Uncle George	TV movie
1982	King's Crossing	Sheriff	"The Home Front"
1982	Hill Street Blues	Corrupt South Ferry Cop Loomis	2 episodes
1982	Fame	Detective Kessler	"Tomorrow's Farewell"
1982–1988	Cagney & Lacey	Harvey Lacey	110 episodes
1983	Bay City Blues	Clancy	2 episodes
1983	The Winds of War	Ed, PBY Pilot	"Into the Maelstrom"
1983	Miss Lonelyhearts	Reverend Walker	TV movie
1985	Finder of Lost Loves	Dr. Arthur Barwell	"Final Analysis"
1985	Hostage Flight	DiSalvo	TV movie
1986	Welcome Home, Bobby	Geffin	TV movie
1986	The Return of Mickey Spillane's Mike Hammer	Chapel	TV movie
1987	Downpayment on Murder	Albert	TV movie
1987	The New Mike Hammer	Adam Simon	"Green Lipstick"
1987	Daddy	Mike Burnette	TV movie
1988	Police Story: Burnout	Captain Harrison	TV movie
1988	ABC Afterschool Special	Joe Farrell	"Date Rape"
1989	Snoops	Lieutenant Sam Akers	4 episodes
1989	227	Nathan Pollack	"Jackée"
1989	Baby Cakes	Al	TV movie
1989	The Cover Girl and the Cop	Lieutenant Wingo	TV movie
1989	Murder, She Wrote	Lieutenant Martin McGinn	"The Grand Old Lady"'
1990	Nightmare on the 13th Floor	Sergeant Madden	TV movie
1991	In a Child's Name	Joe Silvano	2 episodes
1991	Perry Mason: The Case of the Glass Coffin	Jake Morrison	TV movie
1992	Murder, She Wrote	Patrick MacNair	"To the Last Will I Grapple with Thee"
1992	Calendar Girl, Cop, Killer? The Bambi Bembenek Story	John Garner	TV movie
1993	Without Warning: Terror in the Towers	Jack McAllister	TV movie
1994	Roseanne: An Unauthorized Biography	Jerry Barr	TV movie
1994	MacShayne: Winner Takes All	Waldo Church	TV movie
1994	Cagney & Lacey: The Return	Harvey Lacey	TV movie
1994–1995	Mad About You	Gus Stemple	3 episodes
1995	Murder, She Wrote	Superintendent Arthur Joyce	2 episodes
1995	Cagney & Lacey: Together Again	Harvey Lacey	TV movie
1995	Cagney & Lacey: The View Through the Glass Ceiling	Harvey Lacey	TV movie
1996	Cagney & Lacey: True Convictions	Harvey Lacey	TV movie

== Stage credits ==
Year	Title	Role(s)	Performances	Venue	Notes
1959-60	Sweet Bird of Youth	Tom Junior	375	Martin Beck Theatre	Replacement
1960-61	Invitation to a March	Aaron Jablonski; Schuyler Grogan	113	Music Box Theatre	
1963	The Resistible Rise of Arturo Ui	Shorty; Ensemble	8	Lunt-Fontanne Theatre	
1963	Luther	Ensemble		Lunt-Fontanne Theatre	
1964	The Milk Train Doesn't Stop Here Anymore	Stage Manager	5	Brooks Atkinson Theatre	
1965	All in Good Time	Geoffrey Fitton	44	Royale Theatre	
1965	Postmark Zero	Unknown	8	Brooks Atkinson Theatre	
1966	Monopoly	Joe (Monopoly); Mr. Stein (Suburban Tragedy)	49	Stage 73	
