= Jonathan Frid =

Canadian actor (1924–2012)

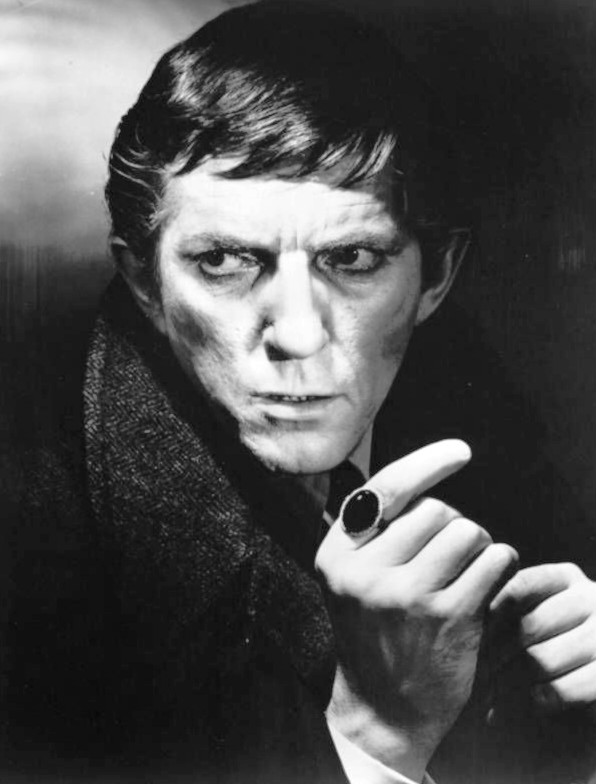
- Publicity photo of Frid on Dark Shadows, c. 1968
- Born: John Herbert Frid; December 2, 1924; Hamilton, Ontario, Canada
- Died: April 14, 2012 (aged 87); Hamilton, Ontario, Canada
- Education: McMaster University (BA); Royal Academy of Dramatic Art (PGDip); Yale University (MFA)
- Occupation: Actor
- Years active: 1946–2012
- Known for: Portraying Barnabas Collins in Dark Shadows

John Herbert Frid (December 2, 1924 – April 14, 2012), known as Jonathan Frid, was a Canadian actor, best known for his role as vampire Barnabas Collins on the gothic television soap opera Dark Shadows. The introduction in 1967 of Frid's reluctant, guilt-ridden vampire caused the floundering daytime drama to soar to 20 million daily viewers. His watershed portrayal has been cited as a key influence on contemporary genre film and television series such as Twilight, True Blood and The Vampire Diaries.

== Biography ==
=== Early life ===
Jonathan Frid was born of Scottish and English ancestry in Hamilton, Ontario, Canada. His birth name was John Herbert Frid. He was the youngest son of Isabel Flora (née McGregor) and Herbert Percival "H.P." Frid, a construction executive.

As a boy Frid had a natural shyness and struggled academically due to dyslexia, which was not properly understood at that time. His passion for acting began at the age of 16 when he appeared in a production of Richard Brinsley Sheridan's The Rivals at Hillfield School. The following year he joined the local community theatre, The Players' Guild of Hamilton. The theatre's leading director, American actress Gladys Gillan recognized and encouraged the young Frid's talent.

Frid's first years of study at McMaster University in Hamilton were interrupted when in 1944 he enlisted in the Royal Canadian Navy during World War II, and served on the destroyer HMCS Algonquin (R17). When the war ended, he returned to McMaster to complete his bachelor's degree. During the second half of his tenure he was President of the Drama Club, received accolades for his performances in The Royal Family and The Barretts of Wimpole Street, and graduated in 1948 with the university's Honor Society Award for Drama.

=== Professional training and theatre ===
In 1949 Frid was accepted at the prestigious Royal Academy of Dramatic Art in London. After two terms, Frid left and became a leading actor in repertory in Cornwall and Kent for two seasons and toured the country in the West End thriller, The Third Visitor. Returning to Canada he ventured to Toronto where he became a featured player for three consecutive seasons in the Toronto Shakespeare Festival, produced and directed by Earle Grey. He studied voice at the Lorne Greene Academy of Radio Arts, and in 1952 appeared in Crime of Passion at the Jupiter Theatre founded by Lorne Greene. He applied his training to radio spots and a few appearances on television for the Canadian Broadcasting Corporation, including an unusual role as a native in 20,000 Leagues Under the Sea.

In the Fall of 1954 Frid became a graduate student at the Yale School of Drama in New Haven, Connecticut. He would earn his Master of Fine Arts (MFA) in Directing, however as one of the most experienced actors in the school, Frid was continually in demand for acting roles in mainstage and student productions including Julius Caesar in Caesar and Cleopatra, and starring in the premiere of William Snyder's play A True and Special Friend.

In the summer of 1955 fresh from completing the first year of his Master's program, Frid was chosen by Director Nikos Psacharopoulos to play a pivotal role in the inaugural season of the Williamstown Theatre Festival in Williamstown, Massachusetts. Frid performed leading roles in six of the ten productions including The Crucible, Time of the Cuckoo, Light up the Sky, and The Rainmaker opposite leading lady Cynthia Harris.

After receiving high praise in his second year at Yale for his portrayal of Tullus Aufidius in William Shakespeare's Coriolanus, Frid was invited to join the American Shakespeare Festival in Stratford, Connecticut. For two consecutive summer seasons, under the direction of John Houseman, Frid performed with such distinguished actors as Alfred Drake, Earle Hyman, Fritz Weaver, Sada Thompson, and Katharine Hepburn.

Jonathan Frid promotional headshot, 1957

After earning his MFA in 1957, Frid joined Hepburn and other members of the American Shakespeare Festival on a national tour of Much Ado About Nothing. When the tour concluded Frid moved to New York City, where he made his off-Broadway debut in The Golem directed by Robert Kalfin. In 1961 he began using the stage name Jonathan Frid, first seen in the program for The Moon in The Yellow River. He continued to appear in many off-Broadway productions and in regional theatres across the United States. Among them were Front Street Theater in Memphis; Pittsburgh Playhouse; and the Old Globe Theatre in San Diego. His most celebrated Shakespearean performance was the title role in Richard III at the 1965 Summer Festival of Professional Theatre at Pennsylvania State University.

Frid made his Broadway debut as an understudy, and appeared, in the 1964 play Roar Like a Dove, directed by Cyril Ritchard and starring Betsy Palmer.

=== Television and film ===
Frid's United States television appearances began in 1960 with his role as Thomas Percy, 1st Earl of Worcester in Shakespeare's Henry IV Part I as part of Play of the Week. This was followed by an episode of CBS-TV's Look Up and Live, The Picture of Dorian Gray, and several episodes as a psychiatrist on the CBS-TV soap opera As The World Turns.

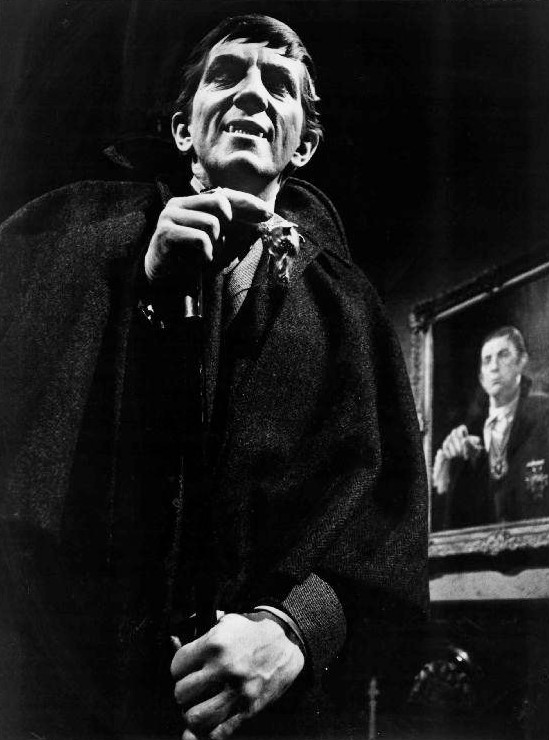
Frid as Barnabas Collins, 1968

Frid is widely known for the role of vampire Barnabas Collins in the original gothic serial Dark Shadows, which ran from 1966 to 1971.

In early March 1967 Frid was arriving at his Manhattan apartment following the completion of a National Tour of Hostile Witness with Ray Milland when he received the phone call from his agent that would change his life: a request to audition for a 13-week role as a vampire. Although planning to move to the West Coast to pursue a teaching position at a Southern California university, Frid appeased his agent by auditioning for the role that, if he got the part, would help finance his move west. He won the role of Barnabas Collins, a vampire released from a chained coffin after 175 years, on the gothic daytime serial Dark Shadows. Before taping began the producers asked the actor and the writers, including Ron Sproat, a fellow Yale alumnus, to discuss the character's development. Collaborating with the writers, Frid explained that when he played villains he invested them with an emotional life. The result was a new interpretation of a vampire: a monster depending upon blood to survive yet fighting to regain his humanity. Frid's compelling portrayal of the sympathetic vampire was so popular with audiences that his short-term contract stretched into four years and Frid scrapped his plans to move to the West Coast.

Frid appeared on The Merv Griffin Show, The Mike Douglas Show, The Dick Cavett Show, and The Tonight Show, and was a special mystery guest on What's My Line? The image of Frid as Barnabas Collins was used on the covers of comic books, paperback gothic novels, bubble gum cards and a board game, complete with coffin. Screaming teenagers thronged to his personal appearances like he was one of the Beatles. The Dark Shadows ABC Studios in Manhattan became inundated with fan mail for Frid, at its peak reaching upwards of 5,000 letters per week.

In 1970, Dark Shadows became the first soap opera to be converted into a feature-length movie. Frid made his American feature film debut portraying his famous television character in MGM's House of Dark Shadows. While the movie script kept the same characters as the TV series, it was a bloodier, more violent story.

During the run of Dark Shadows, and particularly with the release of House of Dark Shadows, Frid was made aware of speculation he could be typecast. Both during and immediately after Dark Shadows, he worked to broaden his acting identity with theatre roles very different from television's Barnabas Collins. In 1969 he took a four-week hiatus from the show to star in the Frederick Knott play Dial M for Murder at the legendary The Little Theatre on the Square in Sullivan, Illinois.

With the announcement of the cancellation of Dark Shadows in March 1971, Frid returned to performing on stage with the role of Thomas Becket in the Off-Broadway play Murder in the Cathedral, followed by Harry Roat in Wait Until Dark at the Windmill Dinner Theaters in Fort Worth and Houston. In 1973, Frid performed a supporting role in the TV movie The Devil's Daughter starring Shelley Winters, and in 1974 starred in Oliver Stone's directorial debut, the horror film Seizure. Seizure was Frid's last screen appearance for 38 years during which he only appeared in theatre productions.

Frid found the role of Barnabas Collins to have many facets with a demanding range of emotions to play. Even so, the heavily promoted image of Barnabas baring his fangs left industry people, who may never have seen the show, with only a caricature of what he actually played. Frid became very conflicted about the commercial career his talent agency was offering. He did not want to become the modern-day version of Bela Lugosi, so he stepped away. For a few years he travelled, lived in Mexico for a while, and enjoyed quiet time out of the spotlight of fame.

== Later career ==
Returning to New York, Frid began his journey back to the boards. In 1977, he accepted an invitation from Penn State College to appear in the role of Tony Cavendish in the comedy The Royal Family for their Professional Summer Series Festival. This was followed by his participation in stage readings of new plays. Enjoying the low-key, independent nature of this work, he searched for other outlets and discovered one from a very unexpected source.

Dark Shadows, which featured an undead character, was a show that refused to die. It was being shown in various markets around the country and internationally; it was the first soap opera ever to have been syndicated. Committed fans of the series were working to keep the show 'alive' through fan conventions and special events. Frid overcame his reluctance and appeared in 1982 at an event called Shadowcon VI in Los Angeles.

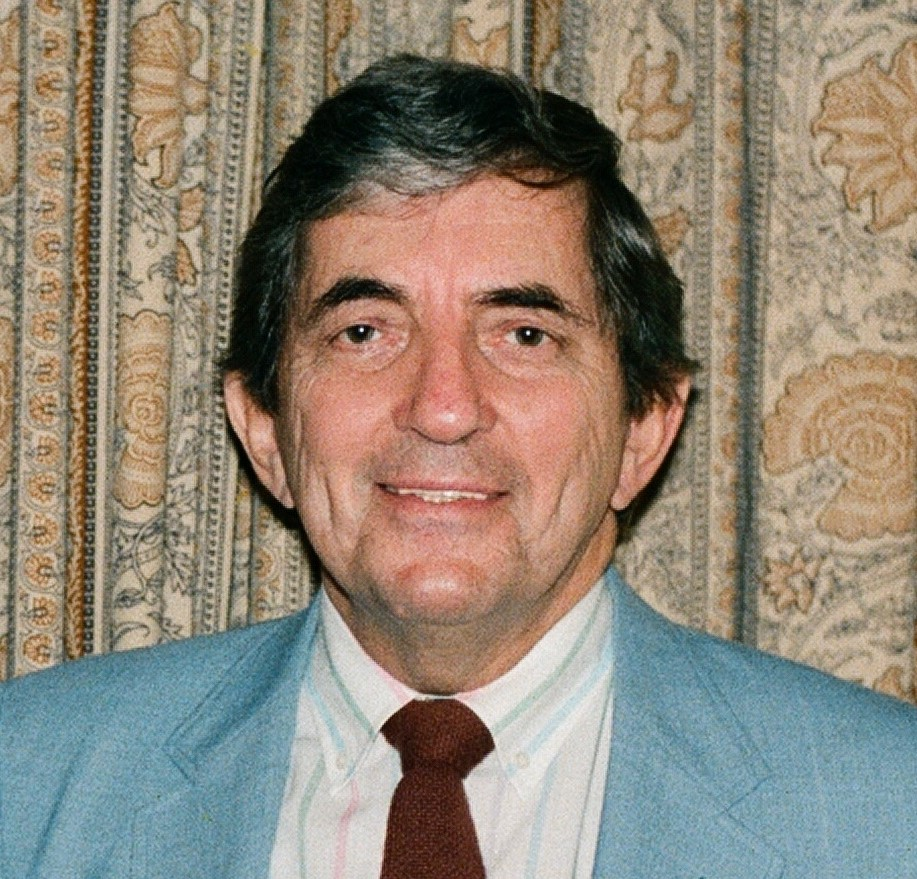
Jonathan Frid at the 1985 Dark Shadows Festival in Newark, NJ.

In addition to question-and-answer sessions Frid read poems and prose, and received an enthusiastic response from the fans. For a new fan event dubbed the Dark Shadows Festival, he created a special program entitled Genesis of Evil: Part I was cuttings from classic plays Frid had performed in his career; and Part II was poems and prose fans had written about Barnabas over the years.

In 1985 Frid was invited to do a fundraising television special by the New Jersey Network during which he performed Edgar Allan Poe's The Tell-Tale Heart and a soliloquy from Richard III. Following the broadcast, Frid met his business partner Mary O'Leary. Together they formed the theatrical production company Clunes Associates to develop a one-man show, inspired by Genesis of Evil. Jonathan Frid's Fools & Fiends had its debut at Salve Regina University in Newport, Rhode Island in October 1986.

Two months later, Frid succeeded Abe Vigoda, also a Dark Shadows alumnus, as Jonathan Brewster in the highly successful 1986–87 Broadway revival of Arsenic and Old Lace, Frid toured the country for almost a year with co-stars Jean Stapleton, Marion Ross, Larry Storch and Gary Sandy. After completing the tour of Arsenic and Old Lace, he completely focused on his one-man show Jonathan Frid's Fools & Fiends, eventually creating two more shows: Jonathan Frid's Fridiculousness and Jonathan Frid's Shakespearean Odyssey. Discovering that reader's theater was his favorite form of acting, he toured for the next eight years performing at numerous colleges, universities, libraries, performing arts centers and private events across the United States and some locations in Canada. While on campuses, he also conducted acting workshops with students and seminars on Shakespeare with educators, fulfilling his deep-rooted desire to teach.

In 1993 Frid welcomed an invitation from Georgia College & State University to direct The Lion in Winter. While Frid had been directing himself for years in his one-man shows, this was the first time he would be directing a company of players since his days at Yale more than a quarter of a century earlier. He selected his former Dark Shadows colleague Marie Wallace to portray Eleanor of Aquitaine.

At the age of 70, Frid moved back to Canada, where he bought his first house in Ancaster, Ontario. He was a regular visitor at the Royal Botanical Gardens (Ontario), became a member of the Richard III Society of Canada, and in 1997 was the Narrator in a production of Peter and the Wolf at the Central Presbyterian Church of Hamilton. From 1998 to 2002 under the banner of Charity Associates he occasionally performed his one-man shows for charities in Canada and the United States. In 2000, he starred as Father Tim Farley in the two-character play Mass Appeal, which enjoyed a successful, limited run in Hamilton and at the Stirling Festival Theatre in Stirling, Ontario.

In 2007, Frid returned, after more than a decade, to the Dark Shadows Festivals to celebrate the 40th anniversary of his first appearance as Barnabas Collins. Subsequently, he attended the annual festival for the next four years. In 2010 he returned to the role of Barnabas for the first time in thirty-nine years in Big Finish Productions' Dark Shadows audio drama The Night Whispers.

Along with former Dark Shadows castmates Lara Parker, David Selby, and Kathryn Leigh Scott, Frid spent three days at Pinewood Studios in June 2011 filming a cameo appearance as a guest in the "happening" scene for the 2012 Tim Burton Dark Shadows film, which became his final film appearance. The film's star Johnny Depp told the Los Angeles Times "Jonathan Frid was the reason I used to run home to watch Dark Shadows. His elegance and grace was an inspiration then and will continue to remain one. When I had the honor to finally meet him…he was elegant and magical as I had always imagined."

== Personal life ==
Frid never married. He lost many friends during the AIDS crisis, and sat by many of their bedsides to provide companionship at the end of their lives.

== Death and legacy ==
At his 1998 induction as a McMaster University Alumni Honoree, Frid said he wanted to be remembered for "creating illusion through body language and the spoken word".

Frid died at Juravinski Hospital in Hamilton, Ontario, of pneumonia and complications after a fall. While some sources at the time variously reported the date of his death as April 13 or April 14, Frid's relative, David Howitt, confirmed that Frid died in the early hours of April 14, 2012. Howitt added that while Friday the 13th "makes for good press...it's good to get it right".

Throughout his life, Frid had always made himself available to support charities. He donated the bulk of his estate to the Hamilton Community Foundation, co-founded by his father H.P. Frid in 1954.

A biographical film Dark Shadows and Beyond: The Jonathan Frid Story was released in October 2021 by MPI Media Group. Film critic Dann Gire of the Daily Herald wrote, "Dark Shadows and Beyond: The Jonathan Frid Story is directed with economy and panache by Mary O'Leary...Her biography of the popular actor evolves into a love letter for the performing arts, exemplified by a man whose devotion to his craft became the driving force in his life".

== Filmography ==
=== Film ===
Year	Title	Role	Notes
1970	House of Dark Shadows	Barnabas Collins	
1973	The Devil's Daughter	Mr. Howard	
1974	Seizure	Edmund Blackstone	
2012	Dark Shadows	Guest #1	(final film role)

=== Television ===
Year	Title	Role	Notes
1960	The Play of the Week	Richard Scroop	1 episode
1961	Golden Showcase	Mercutio	Episode: "The Picture of Dorian Gray"
1962	As the World Turns	Psychiatrist	
1967–71	Dark Shadows	Barnabas Collins; Bramwell Collins	595 episodes
