= Daniel Collins (Dark Shadows) =

- Dark Shadows character
- Portrayed by: David Henesy (1796), Louis Edmonds (1840)
- First appearance: February 1968
- Last appearance: January 1971
- Created by: Dan Curtis and Sam Hall
In-universe information
- Occupation: Master of Collinwood
- Father: Theodore Collins
- Siblings: Millicent Collins Forbes
- Spouse: Harriet Collins (1806–1830)
- Sons: Quentin Collins; Gabriel Collins
- Grandchildren: Tad Collins; Edward Collins; Judith Collins; Quentin Collins; Carl Collins
- Grandparents: Isaac Collins; Annabella Collins
- Uncles: Caleb Collins
- Nieces and nephews: Flora Collins
- First cousins: Joshua Collins; Abigail Collins; Jeremiah Collins
- Other relatives: Barnabas Collins; Sarah Collins; Desmond Collins

Daniel Collins is a fictional character that appeared on the 1960s ABC daytime soap opera Dark Shadows. Initially the character was portrayed by child actor David Henesy during a storyline that has become informally known as the "1795 Flashback". In 1970, the character returned (now an adult) for the "1840 Flashback" storyline, this time played by stage actor Louis Edmonds.

== Biography ==
Daniel Collins (David Henesy) was born in 1785, in New York City, to Theodore Collins and his wife. He spent the first ten or so years of his life there. In the winter of 1795, he and his older sister Millicent (Nancy Barrett) were invited to the town of Collinsport, Maine and to the estate of Collinwood, to attend the planned wedding of their cousin Barnabas Collins (Jonathan Frid) and his then-fiancee, Josette du Pres (Kathryn Leigh Scott).

Daniel and his sister, Millicent, were heirs in their own right to a large portion of the Collins Family fortune (as the only surviving members of the New York branch of the Collins family). Joshua Collins (Louis Edmonds) had hoped to consolidate this fortune by arranging a marriage between Millicent and his younger brother, Jeremiah (Anthony George), but neither Jeremiah nor Millicent had any interest in such an alliance. Millicent secretly married naval captain Lt. Nathan Forbes (Joel Crothers) after she had given her share of the fortune to Daniel to prove that Forbes was not after her money. Forbes arranged to become Daniel's guardian and then drove Millicent insane (not a terribly difficult task) and hired Noah Gifford (Craig Slocum) to kill Daniel. Forbes was killed by Barnabas Collins and Joshua took Daniel in as his heir since Millicent never recovered her sanity. Since Joshua's wife, Naomi (Joan Bennett), and their children, Barnabas and Sarah (Sharon Smythe) were all dead (or undead), Daniel became the sole heir to the Collins Family fortune.

As an adult in the 1800s, Daniel (played by Edmonds) married a woman named Harriet (Gaye Edmond) and became the patriarch of Collinwood. He had two sons, Quentin (David Selby) and Gabriel Collins (Christopher Pennock). Controlling the Collins estate had made Daniel proud, and he became an arrogant and vulgar man abusing his wife Harriet and Gabriel, though he always loved Quentin seeing him as the future successor to the Collins’ estate. Daniel often thought little of Gabriel, and considered him “dead” when he was crippled in an accident, this abuse made Gabriel despise Daniel. In 1830, Harriet died from a mysterious fall from Widow's Hill. It was said that the fact Daniel had murdered her was the "most well known family secret". Daniel, plagued by the guilt of killing Harriet began a long slide into senility and dementia. He often believed Harriet was haunting him and could appear anywhere in Collinwood except for the Tower Room, where Daniel had strangled her before throwing her body off the cliff.

In late 1840, the Collins family was set upon by the spirit of centuries old warlock named Judah Zachery (Michael McGuire). Although dead, the head of Judah Zachery contained the warlock's malevolent spirit, and whoever took possession of the head became Judah's unwilling slave. The head passed through several hands but ultimately came into the possession of a seaman named Gerard Stiles (James Storm), a seaman and friend of Quentin Collins. Zachery took complete possession of Gerard and used the younger man’s personality and charm to insinuate his way into the Collins family fortune.

Gerard framed Quentin for the murders of Lorna Bell (Marilyn Joseph) and Randall Drew (Gene Lindsey) as well as various acts of Satanism and convinced Daniel to alter his will leaving the Collins estate to Gerard rather than Quentin. Daniel's mental stability was greatly traumatized by the event and his health took a turn for the worse. Compounding the ailing Daniel's stress was the appearance of a woman named Valerie Collins (Lara Parker). Valerie was in fact the reincarnated witch Angelique Bouchard who had terrorized Collinsport nearly fifty years earlier. Daniel recalled Angelique from his childhood memories and the shock of seeing her still alive and youthful drove him over the edge of sanity.

In the end, it was actually Daniel's second son, Gabriel, who ended his life. Upon learning that Daniel had changed his will to disinherit Quentin for practicing witchcraft, he assumed that Daniel left him the entire fortune. Gabriel assaulted Daniel inducing a seizure which ultimately claimed his life. But Gabriel later discovered that the family fortune was to be left to Gerard Stiles as guardian of Quentin's son Tad Collins (Henesy), until Tad turned 21; and sole heir should Tad die before then, or be taken from Collinwood by his mother Samantha Drew Collins (Virginia Vestoff).

== Parallel Time ==
In 1970, the series writers began a storyline which focused on alternate realities. The character of Barnabas Collins discovered that the entrance to a specific room at Collinwood led into a parallel dimension where characters and events played out in similar form to their mainstream counterparts. In this parallel time, David Henesy played another character named Daniel Collins. This character was the counterpart to David Collins, but was the son of Quentin and Angelique Collins.

== Revival Series ==
In 1991, Dan Curtis Productions revived the Dark Shadows series as a one-hour night time soap opera for NBC. The series re-imagined the "1795 Flashback" storyline and cast child actor Joseph Gordon-Levitt in the role of Daniel Collins. Levitt also played Daniel's modern day descendant David Collins throughout the series. This version of Daniel Collins also made cameo appearances in Dark Shadows comic book limited series by Innovation Comics.

== See also ==
- List of Dark Shadows characters
