= Henesy =

Henesy is a surname. Notable people with the surname include:

- David Henesy (born 1955–1956), American actor
- Ainna Fawcett-Henesy (born 1946), Irish nurse
