= Robert Christie (actor) =

Canadian actor

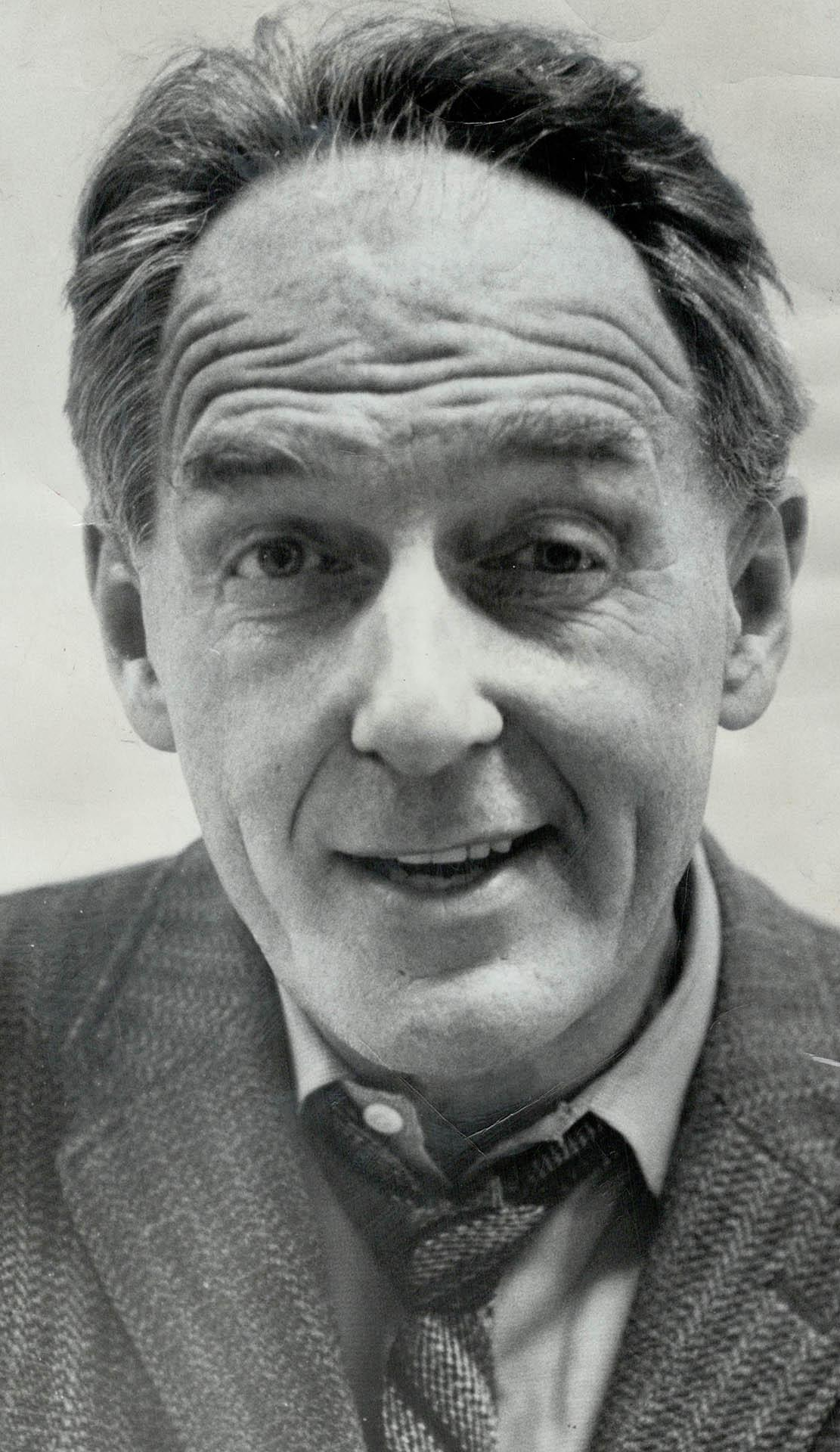
- Born: Robert Wallace Christie; September 20, 1913; Toronto, Ontario, Canada
- Died: May 22, 1996 (aged 82); Toronto, Ontario, Canada
- Occupation: Actor
- Years active: 1950–1989
- Spouses: Marguerite Eliza "Margot" Syme (1937-1964); 2 daughters; Grania Mortimer (1964-1996; his death); 2 sons 1 daughter

Robert Wallace Christie (September 20, 1913 – May 22, 1996) was a Canadian actor and director.

== Early life ==
Christie was born in Toronto in 1913. He received a B.A. from the University of Toronto.

== Career ==
In 1933, he acted in the Dominion Drama Festival. In 1936, he moved to England where he performed with various companies including the Old Vic Company.

Christie served with the Canadian Army during World War II. After the war, he joined the CBC Radio Drama Department and also acted in the New Play Society, where he performed the role of Sir John A. Macdonald in the 1949 play Riel by John Coulter. He reprised his role in the CBC Television educational series Exploring Minds and the Global series Witness to Yesterday. He also appeared in Mavor Moore's Sunshine Town in 1955.

Christie joined the performing company at the Stratford Festival in 1953 and appeared on Broadway in Tamburlaine by Christopher Marlowe in 1956 and Love and Libel by Robertson Davies in 1960. He performed several times at the Crest Theatre in Toronto in Orpheus Descending, Juno and the Paycock and Hamlet. In 1969, he performed at Stratford with his daughter Dinah Christie in a production of Satryicon. They were the first father and daughter to perform together at Stratford.

On television, in 1961 he played MacTaggart in Jake and the Kid, and in 1967, he appeared in the series Hatch's Mill.

He also taught acting at Ryerson Polytechnic University, now Toronto Metropolitan University and Seneca College.

== Personal life ==
He married British actress Marguerite Eliza "Margot" Syme on March 4, 1937; they later divorced. They had two daughters, actress/singer Dinah Christie and artist Cedar Christie.

Christie married Canadian production and stage manager Grania Mortimer on July 17, 1964. They had one daughter, Fiona Christie, and two sons, Matthew Christie and David Christie.

Christie died in May 1996 in Toronto.
