= Cosette Lee =

Canadian actress

- Born: Mable Cosette LeGassicke; 10 July 1910; Toronto, Ontario, Canada
- Died: 19 September 1976 (aged 66)
- Occupation: Actress
- Years active: 1919–1976
- Spouse: Charles Fryer

Cosette Lee (10 July 1910 – 19 September 1976) was a Canadian stage, radio, television and film actress. Though she was a stalwart character doyenne, prominent in every arena of the theatre arts in Canada, she is best remembered for her roles as Raxl, Daughter of the Priestess of the Serpent on Strange Paradise (1969–70), and as Ma Cobb in Deranged (1975).

== Early life and career ==
Cosette Lee began acting at a very young age; she grew up in the midst of a decided theatrical atmosphere at home. Born Mabel Cosette LeGassicke, she stated in a 1966 interview that her ancestors were of Normandy French stock. Cosette recalled: "My mother gave me the name Cosette, thinking it couldn't be shortened. My grandmother once remarked I looked 'cosy' in my crib, and I've been Cosy ever since. It sounds like a fan dancer." (Cosette was often billed as Cosy Lee in her earlier years.) She further stated: "My first professional appearance was with the Von Glazer Players, a Toronto stock company, in Peter Pan. I was Toodles, the leader of the gang of children, and it was at the Uptown Theatre." This was apparently sometime around 1916–1919 (she was vague about the date in interviews).

Her mother, a milliner, made hats for some of the celebrated actresses of the World War I period in Toronto. Her father acted in "minstrel" shows at the YMCA, and also appeared in church theatricals. Asked when she had known she was going to be an actress, Cosette cited a family atmosphere in which she was encouraged to do little performances at home for the entertainment of the adults:

"They encouraged me. They knew I loved it. My aunt used to say: 'Cosy, tell us about your trip to New York,' and I'd put on my father's hat and my mother's shoes and carry a briefcase for a valise, and I'd go on and on about my New York trip. I was three or four and had never been to New York."

After Peter Pan, the young Cosy continued to participate in other productions. She took a secretarial course as a young woman. She graduated from it, but acting work remained steady and she remained in the theatre. Her mother had taught her to sew and she often made her own costumes. Besides plays, she also had a career as a "character elocutionist," performing mostly comic monologues in a style that in some ways anticipates the stand-up comedy boom of the present era.

This was the story as Cosette told it in a 1966 interview, and was one that is found in other interviews she gave over the course of the final decade of her life. In a 1963 interview, she gave a less rosy-coloured image of her early life:

"Born Cosette Le Gassicke, the oldest of five daughters, Miss Lee had no encouragement from her parents in her acting aspirations. Too precarious a living, they said; take a business course. She took one, and loathed it.

"[Cosette remembered:] 'Then at 16 I got a part in "The Trial of Mary Duggan" at the Grand Opera House. And I knew I could not turn back.'

"From 16 to 22 she put in an apprenticeship in the U. S., learning 'the craft' with people like Wallace Ford, Leo Carillo, Walter Kingsford, Spring Byington. They were good years.

"[Cosette continued:]'Then, in 1932, I got a telegram as I was reading for a part in New York to say that the clothing business my father had worked for had gone under, and I was needed back home. Depression was sinking showbusiness in Toronto; the stock companies like the Grand Opera, the Empire, the Vaughan Glaser and the Cameron Mathews, were folding. I had to do something, and there seemed nothing to do.'" It seems to have been at this time that she worked as a puppeteer, among other jobs. In this interview, Cosette gave the date 1936 for the date of her first radio play, organized by Win Barron. This was described as a half-hour murder mystery titled Vitrol, presumably a serial. It was at this time that the actress adopted the professional name of Cosette Lee.

Vitrol, and other productions which followed, was produced on radio station CFCH (which subsequently became the CBC). Cosette remembered: "... we all sat around a squat little microphone placed in the centre of a table in a very small room, and each in turn would speak into the object. We also did our own sound effects, and at the appropriate moment, would scramble from our chairs, race to a corner of the room near the controls, and rattle some cellophane to imitate the sound of fire, or use some other elementary sort of approach. It was fun, and I think that the young people now are missing a lot."

The work in radio kept her busy, and included appearances in a Canadian radio production of the popular comic strip Buck Rogers, as well as a morning show, Good morning Breakfast Club. These were in the 1930s. It was in the 1940s that her stage career really took off. Favorite roles she mentioned frequently in interviews included Madam Arcati in Noel Coward's Blithe Spirit (she played in at least four different productions of it), Madam Alvarez in Gigi, Lady Bracknell in Oscar Wilde's The Importance of Being Earnest, and the Bernard Shaw drama, Arms and the Man

Cosette created a one woman show in the early 1950s. It was a success, and she presented it three years in a row. The Vinegar Tree was advertised in a 1953 newspaper ad as "spicy, screamingly funny adult entertainment." During this period she was frequently billed under her nickname, Cosy Lee. Also in 1953, Cosette co-starred with Drew Thompson in Separate Rooms (presumably, the play by Joseph Carole and Alan Dinehart which had logged over 600 performances in its original Broadway engagement in 1940-41). A reviewer cited in another newspaper ad hailed Cosette's production: "The largest first night audience in five years screamed, roared and howled at this rowdy, boisterous and very spicy comedy hit which the International Players are reviving for the third time in Kingston."

In 1963 Cosette recalled:

"People asked me, how could I be so egotistical to think I could do a whole two-hour show myself? But I admired Ruth Draper tremendously, and it was a great challenge. And it helped me improve my craft. The other day, I had an argument with an actor, who wanted to know how to play a part. All the books he'd read, he said, claimed it wasn't right, the way he was doing it. Does it FEEL right, I asked him. Well, yes, he said. Then that's the way to do it, I told him. We need more confidence in the acting profession! more American get-up-and-go."

== The 1950s and 1960s: Work in television and film ==
In 1960, Cosette appeared opposite future Strange Paradise co-stars Jack Creley and Dawn Greenhalgh in a play, Tunnel of Love, performed at the Lansdowne Theatre in Toronto. A reviewer commented: "Cosette Lee... has just the trick of making bricks with very little straw." (Jack Creley, who went on to portray the suavely villainous Laslo Thaxton on Strange Paradise, was thus described: "Mr. Creley offers a model of intense comedy technique. No gag, or even suspicion of a gag, slips by the mobile puckered Creley countenance, while the lithe Creley form describes endlessly the tensions of the amateur deceiver.")

Her scrapbooks, as preserved in the Cosette Lee Collection in the Toronto Public Library, reveal active television work beginning in 1955 and continuing down until the mid 1970s. She had considerable work acting in commercials. Early drama appearances in the medium included Forever Galatea (1955), The Runaways (1958), Bousille and the Just (1962), Pearl Tolliver in Scarlett Hll (1963) an early Canadian soap opera, A Train of Murder (1964–65), and A Game Like Only a Game (1965). A prominent television role for her was on 2 March 1965 in an episode of CBC-TV's "Eye Opener", "The Trial of Joseph Brodsky". She also appeared in a brief but memorable character role as a garrulous landlady in the UK-Canadian co-production Seaway (also 1965). The latter show was rerun on one of the vintage television channels in Australia in 2014.

She achieved greater national renown among television viewers across the country with her regular role was as Maggie Hatch in the Hatch's Mill (1966–67). In this series, she played opposite Sylvia Feigel, a young Canadian actress who went on to portray Holly on Strange Paradise.

Perhaps Cosette's best-remembered television role was in the 1969-70 television show Strange Paradise. Unlike her other television work, Strange Paradise was syndicated in the US and in subsequent repeat markets throughout the 1970s-1980s and beyond, with episodes available on YouTube since around 2009. It has become firmly established as a "cult" television series. Cosette's character was featured on the cover of a novel devoted to her, Raxl, Voodoo Priestess (1970), by Dorothy Daniels.

Cosette's casting in the role of Raxl was quite possibly the result of earlier stage parts that had received positive press attention. Besides playing eccentric medium Madame Arcati in four different productions of Blithe Spirit, she had also portrayed Inuit roles in two different plays. In 1960's The Great Hunger, a play by Len Paterson which had a brief run in November of that year, Cosette played the village shaman (billed in press releases as a "witch woman"). The climax of that play had Cosette as Saodlu the shaman, "who believes that the blood of vengeance must flow" according to a newspaper review Cosette pasted into her scrapbook, going "into a trance and swinging an axe around her head (attached to her headdress by a cord) in order to set her spirit free." It all definitely sounds like a foreshadowing of her dramatic, sometimes bloodchilling scenes as Raxl. Working conditions on the occult-themed serial were at times harsh and stressful, particularly in the early months. In a newspaper article from the autumn of 1969, the reporter recorded the following:

"You should have been here during the first few weeks in August," one of the actors said. "It was horrendous. They talked about taping eight episodes a week, but technicians, Ottawa people, had never done anything like this before. Breakdowns happened all over the place. We got three done the first week.

"We were working a 7 a.m. to 10 p.m. day. Temperatures in the studio reached 120 degrees and we had to faint to get some air conditioning. Morale was terrible."

Despite the difficulties, Cosette claimed to have happy memories when she spoke of working on the serial a couple of years later. In a 1972 interview she recalled :

"We camped it up at rehearsals, which nearly gave the director heart failure. I like to kid and I expect others to kid. But after we'd done it for 11 months, I was sorry to leave all those nice people."

In 1968, Cosette appeared in the film My Side of the Mountain. Other roles included Change of Mind (1969), and The First Time. She played Ma Cobb, the mother of psychotic serial killer Ezra Cobb in the 1974 film Deranged alongside Roberts Blossom. Her final projects involved roles in His Mother and The Far Shore, both released in 1976—she worked almost up to the very end.

== Homelife ==
In the 1960s, Cosette married longtime beau Charles Fryer. She was a resident of Willowdale, Ontario, a suburb of Toronto. Gardening and cooking were two of her favorite leisure activities, along with sewing, of course. She enjoyed furnishing her home with antiques and mementos of the old days. She was much beloved in Canadian theatre circles for her bubbling, vivacious sense of humor and love of laughter.

== Archives ==
Toronto Public Library holds a Cosette Lee Collection 1911; 1920–1976, which contains programs, press clippings, photographs, correspondence, scripts, business papers, documents from professional organizations, memorabilia, all in 3 boxes and 812 items.

== Filmography ==
=== Film ===
- The First Time (You Don't Need Pajamas at Rosie's) (1969) – Grandmother
- My Side of the Mountain (1969) – Apple Lady
- Change of Mind (1969) – Angela Rowe
- Deranged (Deranged: Confessions of a Necrophile) (1974) – Ma Cobb

=== Television ===
- Hatch's Mill (1967) – Maggie Hatch
- Strange Paradise (1969-1970) – Raxl
