= John Sedwick =

American television director (1927–2008)

John Sedwick (July 13, 1927 - July 3, 2008) was a television director and actor.

== Credits ==
- Search For Tomorrow
- One Life to Live
- Dark Shadows
- The Bold and the Beautiful
- The Edge of Night
- Santa Barbara (hired by The Dobsons)

== Awards and nominations ==
He was nominated for 5 Daytime Emmy Awards.
