= Deranged (1974 film) =

1974 horror film by Alan Ormsby and Jeff Gillen

- Theatrical release poster
- Directed by: Jeff Gillen; Alan Ormsby
- Screenplay by: Alan Ormsby
- Produced by: Tom Karr
- Starring: Roberts Blossom; Cosette Lee; Micki Moore; Robert Warner; Pat Orr
- Cinematography: Jack McGowan
- Music by: Carl Zittrer
- Production company: Karr International Pictures
- Distributed by: American International Pictures
- Release date: February 8, 1974
- Running time: 82 minutes
- Country: United States
- Language: English
- Budget: US$200,000

Deranged (also known as Deranged: Confessions of a Necrophile) is a 1974 American psychological horror film directed by Alan Ormsby and Jeff Gillen, and starring Roberts Blossom. Its plot, loosely based on the crimes of Ed Gein, follows Ezra Cobb, a middle-aged man in a rural Midwestern community who begins a string of serial murders and grave robberies after the death of his mother Amanda, a religious fanatic who raised him to be a misogynist. The film features a diegetic narration in which newspaper columnist Tom Simms occasionally appears and narrates the events depicted. Though based on Gein, the film's title is misleading since Gein never experimented with necrophilia (although a necrophile is also defined as having "an obsessive fascination with death and corpses.")

A Canadian film by Karr International Pictures, the production took place in Oshawa, Ontario in the winter of 1973, with a largely Canadian cast and crew. The film was released regionally in several U.S. states on February 8, 1974, before opening in Los Angeles on March 20, 1974.

Deranged had disappeared after its release in 1974; however, it was rediscovered in Florida in the mid-1990s and was released on home video by distributor American International Pictures’ parent company, Metro-Goldwyn-Mayer.

== Plot ==
Middle-aged Ezra Cobb helps operate a farm in the rural Midwest with his elderly mother, Amanda, a religious fanatic who has indoctrinated him since childhood to abhor women. She tells him that there is one woman that he should contact upon her death: Maureen Selby, who, among other things, is described as "fat". Amanda then says that the "wages of sin" are “gonorrhea, syphilis, and death!” Amanda dies following a protracted illness, and Ezra withdraws. Nearly a year after her death, he experiences auditory hallucinations that compel him to exhume his mother. He visits her grave one night, digs up her decomposed body, and brings it home, where he cobbles it together using discarded fish skin and wax. Reading the obituaries, he realizes that he could potentially dig up further bodies for certain parts to keep himself and his mother company.

Ezra becomes acquainted with Maureen Selby, an eccentric middle-aged woman and proclaimed psychic. One night during a sexual encounter, he murders her, an event that sets him off on a chain of serial killings. He first sets his attention on a 34-year-old waitress, Mary Ransum, whom he becomes acquainted with. He slashes her tires one night, leaving her stranded at the restaurant after hours, and then appears under the guise of offering her a ride. She reluctantly agrees to ride with him to his house, where he says he has spare tires. After waiting in the truck for an extended period of time, Mary goes to look for him. In the house, she finds Ezra in a bedroom surrounded by the corpses of his mother and others, his face obscured with a mask made of human flesh. She attempts to flee, but he incapacitates her.

Later, Mary awakens bound in a closet, wearing only undergarments. Ezra escorts her to the dining room, where he seats her at a table surrounded by corpses. He becomes aroused and begins molesting her, during which she convinces him to free her arms. She manages to smash a bottle over his head, but he beats her to death with a human femur bone after she enrages him by flinging his mother's corpse at him, damaging it. A short time later, Ezra visits his friend, Harlon Kootz, at his house, where they discuss Mary's disappearance. Ezra refers to her "being over at his place", a comment Harlon takes in jest. Harlon's teenage son, Brad, arrives with his girlfriend, Sally Mae, who immediately catches Ezra's interest. He later visits her while she works her cashier job at a local store, and shoots her with a rifle; the bullet grazes her head, but does not kill her.

Ezra places Sally Mae in the bed of his truck and drives away, but she awakens and escapes, fleeing into the woods on foot. She inadvertently runs over a bear trap set earlier by Harlon and Brad. The trap mangles her foot and she attempts to hide amidst the underbrush, but Ezra finds her and shoots her to death. Harlon and Brad return to the store and find blood and broken glasses at the cash register, but no sign of Sally Mae; Brad recalls to the sheriff that Ezra was the last person he saw at the store.

Ezra brings Sally Mae's corpse to his farm, where he hangs it upside down in the barn and begins skinning the body. Harlon, Brad, and the sheriff arrive and find him in his kitchen, laughing over a bowl of blood. The picture freezes on this shot and a voiceover by journalist Tom Simms states that "A few days later a group of townspeople, reportedly led by Harlon Kootz, under cover of night, burned the Cobb farm... to the ground.", the line getting progressively quieter until "ground" is barely audible.

== Cast ==
- Roberts Blossom as Ezra Cobb
- Cosette Lee as Amanda Cobb
- Leslie Carlson as Tom Simms
- Robert Warner as Harlon Kootz
- Marcia Diamond as Jenny Kootz
- Brian Smeagle as Brad Kootz
- Arlene Gillen as Miss Johnson
- Robert McHeady as Sheriff
- Marian Waldman as Maureen Selby
- Jack Mather as Drunk
- Micki Moore as Mary Ransum
- Pat Orr as Sally Mae

== Production ==
=== Filming ===
Principal photography took place between February and March 1973 in Oshawa, Ontario, Canada, on a budget of $200,000. Producer Tom Karr, who had been fascinated with Ed Gein for many years, funded the film himself with income he had earned as a concert promoter for Led Zeppelin and Three Dog Night. The Canadian location was chosen to ensure the film achieved a wintry setting. Locations used included an abandoned farmhouse, a local hardware store, and a basement in the hotel in which the cast and crew were lodging. The majority of interior scenes were shot on sets constructed at a local motion picture studio.

This was the only film directed by Jeff Gillen, an actor in a handful of films prior to his death in 1995. Most notably, he portrayed a mall-store Santa Claus in A Christmas Story (1983), whose director, Bob Clark, served as an uncredited producer on Deranged. The film's art director, Albert Fisher, dressed the sets with stacks of crime serials and pornographic magazines; Fisher garnered inspiration by reading newspaper stories about Gein and his crimes.

== Release ==
Deranged was released regionally by American International Pictures in Green Bay, Wisconsin, South Bend, Indiana, and Tampa, Florida, on February 8, 1974. It had its premiere in Los Angeles, California on March 20, 1974.

=== Censorship ===
In order to achieve an R rating, several sequences were truncated or excised entirely. Among these were an extended murder sequence involving Mary Ransum and a protracted dissection sequence in which Cobb mutilates Miss Johnson’s corpse and consumes brains from its skull.

=== Home media ===
In 1994, to celebrate its 20th anniversary, producer Tom Karr released the film on VHS through an independent distributor, Moore Video, based out of Virginia. Its success led to talks of a sequel with a script by Jason Paul Collum, Tim Ritter attached as a director and original star Roberts Blossom in talks to return. Ultimately, with a lack of funding, it never materialized.

In 2002, Metro-Goldwyn-Mayer released Deranged as part of its "Midnite Movies" collection of double feature DVDs. It was released along with the 1980 feature film Motel Hell. Desert Island Classics also released a DVD in the U.S. on March 5, 2014.

In 2007, Germany released an uncut 30th Anniversary Collector's Edition, which includes a brain-scooping scene cut from the U.S. version. It is in 1.85:1 anamorphic widescreen, with English and German (dubbed) audio tracks and optional English and German subtitles.

Deranged was released on Blu-ray in the United Kingdom via Arrow Films on August 19, 2013, which also included a DVD of the film. The film was released on Blu-ray in the United States on July 7, 2015 by Kino Lorber. In early January 2025, Vinegar Syndrome announced they would be releasing the film in 4K UHD Blu-ray later that month.

== Reception ==
=== Critical reaction ===
Linda Gross of the Los Angeles Times called the film "crudely made" and was critical of the dialogue, though she commended the female lead performances of Marian Waldman, Micki Moore and Pat Orr.

Time Out's review of the film was mostly positive, writing, "The more sensationalist aspects of the story are admirably underplayed, and Blossom's nicely gauged performance lends the film surprising conviction." TV Guide awarded the film three out of five stars, praising Blossom's performance and calling it "an accurately recounted horror film inspired by the life of crazed Wisconsin farmer Ed Gein, who actually murdered, skinned and preserved body parts of dozens of women in the late 1950s... A sick little film but told with a disturbing sense of humor." Justin Remer from DVD Talk gave the film 4.5 out of 5 stars, writing, "Deranged is a cult classic that deserves a massively larger cult. Its performances are surprisingly vivid and realistic, its script is smart and subtly funny, its gore is stomach-churning, and its suspense scenes are genuinely nerve-jangling." Robert Vaughn from Diabolique Magazine praised the film for its dark sense of humor, creepy moments, and Blossom’s performance. Dennis Schwartz from Ozus’ World Movie Reviews rated the film a grade B+, calling it "scary and convincing", and commended the film's makeup effects, and Blossom's performance.

Donald Guarisco of AllMovie wrote: "Deranged is interesting because it as witty as it is scary. The film suffers from rough edges, the main problems being inconsistent pacing and a stilted framing device involving an investigative reporter, but remains compelling because it adds some perceptive social satire into the mix."

== See also ==
- List of American films of 1974
- List of rediscovered films

== Sources ==
- Craig, Rob (2019). American International Pictures: A Comprehensive Filmography. Jefferson, North Carolina: McFarland & Company. ISBN 978-1-476-66631-0.
- Woods, Paul Anthony (1995). Ed Gein–Psycho!. New York City, New York: Macmillan. ISBN 978-0-312-13057-2.
