= Dark Shadows =

American Gothic soap opera (1966–1971)

- Genre: Soap opera; Gothic; Horror
- Created by: Dan Curtis
- Developed by: Art Wallace
- Written by: Gordon Russell; Sam Hall; Ron Sproat; Violet Welles; Malcolm Marmorstein; Art Wallace; Joe Caldwell; Francis Swann; Ralph Ellis
- Directed by: Lela Swift; Henry Kaplan; John Sedwick; Sean Dhu Sullivan; Dan Curtis; Jack Sullivan; John Weaver; Penberry Jones; Dennis Kane
- Starring: Joan Bennett; Louis Edmonds; Nancy Barrett; Denise Nickerson; Mitchell Ryan; Alexandra Moltke; Grayson Hall; Kate Jackson; Jonathan Frid; Kathryn Leigh Scott; David Selby; Clarice Blackburn; Lara Parker; Thayer David; John Karlen; David Henesy; Joel Crothers
- Composer: Robert Cobert
- Country of origin: United States
- No. of seasons: 6
- No. of episodes: 1,225 (list of episodes)

Production
- Executive producer: Dan Curtis
- Producer: Robert Costello; Peter Miner; Lela Swift
- Production location: ABC Studios, New York City, U.S.
- Running time: 20–22 minutes
- Production company: Dan Curtis Productions

Original release
- Network: ABC
- Release: June 27, 1966 – April 2, 1971

Dark Shadows is an American Gothic soap opera that aired weekdays on the ABC television network from June 27, 1966, to April 2, 1971. The series depicted the lives, loves, trials, and tribulations of the wealthy Collins family of Collinsport, Maine, where a number of supernatural occurrences take place. It was created and executive-produced by Dan Curtis, and developed by Art Wallace. The ensemble cast featured Joan Bennett, Louis Edmonds, Denise Nickerson, Kathryn Leigh Scott, David Selby, Nancy Barrett, Thayer David, Clarice Blackburn, John Karlen, Jonathan Frid, Grayson Hall, Jerry Lacy and Lara Parker. Actors often portrayed multiple roles; as cast members came and went, some characters were played by more than one actor.

Initially framed as a mixture of family saga and gothic romance, the series introduced progressively more supernatural elements during its first year, culminating in the debut of the vampire Barnabas Collins (Jonathan Frid), who quickly became Dark Shadows' breakout character and main protagonist. The show would go on to feature ghosts, werewolves, zombies, man-made monsters, witches, warlocks, time travel, and parallel universes. Critics and scholars have credited the series with pioneering a more nuanced characterization of supernatural creatures that had previously been depicted as one-dimensional villains or inhuman monsters, and influencing subsequent horror and paranormal-themed TV shows.

During its initial run, Dark Shadows developed a large teenage audience and a dedicated cult following; by 1969, it had become ABC's highest-rated daytime series. The original network run of the show amassed 1,225 episodes over six seasons. The success of the series spawned a media franchise that has included two feature films (House of Dark Shadows in 1970 and Night of Dark Shadows in 1971), a 1991 TV remake, an unsprouted 2004 remake pilot, a 2012 film adaptation directed by Tim Burton, and several spin-off novels and comics. Since 2006, the series has continued as a range of audio dramas produced by Big Finish Productions, featuring members of the original cast including David Selby, Lara Parker, and Kathryn Leigh Scott.

TV Guide's list of all-time Top Cult Shows ranked the series #19 in 2004, and #23 in 2007.

== History ==
Creator Dan Curtis claimed he had a dream in 1965 of a mysterious young woman on a train. The following day Curtis told his wife Norma Mae Curtis of the dream and pitched the idea as a TV series to ABC. Network officials greenlit production and Curtis began hiring crew members.

Art Wallace was hired to create a story from Curtis's dream sequence. Wallace wrote the story bible Shadows on the Wall, the proposed title for the show, later changed to Dark Shadows. Robert Costello was added as a line producer, and Curtis took on the creator and executive producer roles. Lela Swift, John Sedwick, and Henry Kaplan all agreed to be directors for the new series. Robert Cobert created the musical score and Sy Tomashoff designed the set.

=== Broadcast history ===
Perhaps one of ABC's first truly popular daytime series, along with the game show Let's Make a Deal (which had moved from its original home NBC in 1968), Dark Shadows found its demographic niche in teenagers coming home from school in time to watch the show at 4 p.m. Eastern/3 p.m. Central, where it aired for almost all of its network run, the exception being a 15-month stretch between April 1967 and July 1968, when it aired a half-hour earlier. Originally, it was aired in black-and-white, but the show went into color starting with the episode broadcast on August 11, 1967. It became one of ABC's first daytime shows to win the rating for its timeslot, leading to the demise of NBC's original Match Game and Art Linkletter's long-running House Party on CBS, both in 1969.

Dark Shadows began with a 4.1 rating in the 1965–66 TV season, tying for thirteenth place out of eighteen daytime dramas. The audience figures only improved slightly, to 4.3, in 1966–67. 1966 was a volatile year for soaps, and many ended their runs between the premiere date of Dark Shadows in June and the month of December. By that time, six months had passed, and Dark Shadows had failed to gain major traction. In June, it ranked #13 out of 18 soaps, and by December, the lower-rated offerings were gone and the show officially ranked #13 out of 13 soaps. "The show was limping along, really limping", head writer Sam Hall remembered, "and ABC said, 'We're canceling it. Unless you pick up in 26 weeks, you're finished.' [Series creator Dan Curtis] had always wanted to do a vampire picture, so he decided to bring a vampire — Barnabas Collins — to the series."

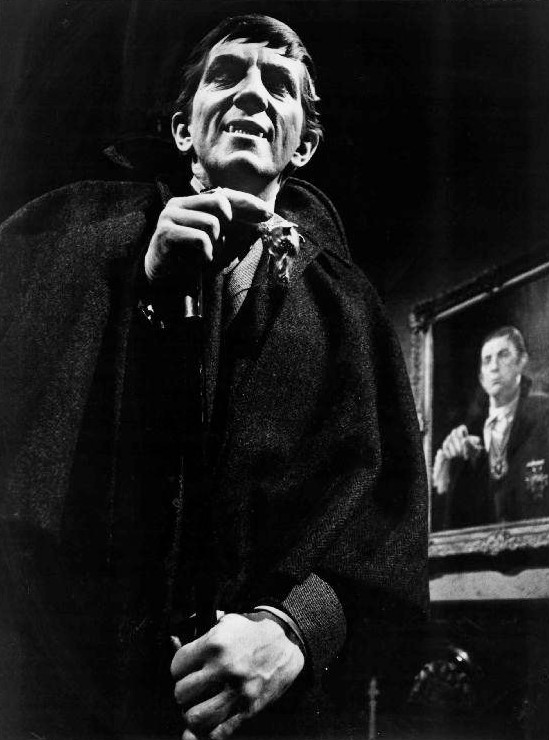
Jonathan Frid as Barnabas Collins, a 200-year-old vampire

Barnabas (Jonathan Frid) was introduced in April 1967. With a time slot change to 3:30 Eastern/2:30 Central, many more teenagers found the program. By May 1968, the series was still in last place (out of 12 offerings), but rose to a 7.3 rating, the rough equivalent of gaining the viewership of three million households in the span of one year. Dark Shadows returned to its 4 p.m. Eastern/3 p.m. Central time slot in July 1968, without losing much of its audience. One Life to Live, which was launched by ABC in July 1968 in the 3:30 slot, also sought to reach the newfound young demographic.

The series reached its peak in popularity during a storyline set in the year 1897, broadcast from March 1969. By the end of May, Dark Shadows was ABC's most popular soap opera, and by late 1969 it was reaching between 7 and 9 million viewers on any given day, and ranking 11th out of a total 15 daytime dramas in that time period.

In November 1969, the 1897 storyline came to an end. With ratings at an all-time high, the writers were under pressure to hold the audience. Fans tended to dislike the portrayal of Barnabas as the pawn of some greater power in the next storyline, known as "The Leviathans". They were more interested in the archetypes of classic horror—the vampire, the witch, the werewolf—than in off-camera suggestion. The launch of Somerset in March 1970, a much-publicized spin-off of NBC's Another World, also hurt the series considerably.

The release of the film House of Dark Shadows in October 1970 is also thought to have caused TV ratings to fall, possibly due to parents, attending the film with their children, discouraging their choice of television viewing material due to the amount of blood spilled on screen in the film. Beginning in the fall of 1970, several ABC stations across the country dropped the show due to falling viewership. Within six months, ratings dropped from 7.3 to 5.3., though the ratings improved in its final weeks. The series was canceled on April 2, 1971, and replaced the following Monday with a new version of the game show Password. The last minute of the final episode included a voiceover by actor Thayer David wrapping up many of the plotlines on the show.

The original cast reunited in 2003 for a special reunion play recorded for MPI, and in 2004 resumed production of Dark Shadows audio dramas for Big Finish. These dramas have been ongoing for 10 seasons.

=== Storylines ===
==== 1966/7 ====
Victoria Winters' Parentage, episode 1 to 97

Victoria Winters and her role as governess is inspired by title character in Charlotte Brontë's Gothic novel Jane Eyre.

Burke Devlin's Revenge For His Manslaughter Conviction, episode 1 to 201

Burke Devlin and his motivation for returning is reminiscent of Alexandre Dumas' novel The Count of Monte Cristo.

Roger Collins' Mysterious Car Crash, episode 13 to 32

The Murder of Bill Malloy, episode 46 to 126

Laura Collins the Phoenix, episode 123 to 194

Jason McGuire Blackmails Elizabeth Collins Stoddard, episode 193 to 276

The Arrival of the Vampire Barnabas Collins, episode 211 to 220

Elements of this storyline are inspired by the novel Dracula by Bram Stoker.

The Kidnapping of Maggie Evans, episode 221 to 261

Julia Hoffman's Attempt to Cure Barnabas, episode 288 to 351

Barnabas Terrorizing Julia Hoffman, episode 352 to 365

==== 1795 ====
Angelique Bouchard's Vampire Curse on Barnabas, episode 366 to 426

Victoria Winters's Witchcraft Trial, episode 400 to 461

The witchcraft trial involving Victoria Winters is inspired by Arthur Miller's play The Crucible. Reverend Trask's fate is inspired by Edgar Allan Poe's short story "The Cask of Amontillado."

Nathan Forbes' Manipulation of Millicent Collins, episode 419 to 460

Nathan Forbes's manipulation of Millicent Collins is reminiscent of the 1938 play and the 1944 film Gaslight.

==== 1968/9 ====
The Mystery of Jeff Clark, episode 461 to 665

The Creation of Adam, episode 466 to 636

The character of Adam is inspired by Mary Shelley's horror novel Frankenstein.

The Dream Curse, episode 477 to 548

Elizabeth's Fear of Being Buried Alive, episode 513 to 672

This storyline is inspired by Edgar Allan Poe's short story "The Premature Burial."

Nicholas Blair's Scheme to Create A Master Race, episode 549 to 633/634

Chris Jennings' Werewolf Curse, episode 627 to 700

The Ghosts of Quentin Collins and Beth Chavez Haunt Collinwood, episode 639 to 700

The character of Quentin Collins and his role is inspired by Peter Quint in Henry James's Gothic novel The Turn of the Screw.

==== 1897 ====
Barnabas’ Mission to Save David Collins, episode 700 to 839

The heartbeat that tortures Quentin is inspired by Edgar Allan Poe's short story "The Tell-Tale Heart."

Jenny Collins, the Mad Woman in the Attic, episode 707 to 748

Jenny Collins is inspired by the character of Bertha Mason from Charlotte Brontë's gothic novel Jane Eyre.

Laura Collins the Phoenix, episode 728 to 761

Worthington Hall and Gregory Trask's running of it is inspired by Charles Dickens's novel Nicholas Nickleby.

Magda Rakosi's Werewolf Curse on Quentin, episode 749 to 834

The portrait of Quentin Collins is inspired by Oscar Wilde's Gothic novel The Picture of Dorian Gray.

Gregory Trask's Manipulation of Judith Collins, episode 762 to 884

Gregory Trask's fate is inspired by Edgar Allan Poe's short story "The Cask of Amontillado".
Minerva Trask's murder is inspired by The Manchurian Candidate.

The Hand of Count Petofi, episode 778 to 814

The hand of Count Andreas Petofi is inspired by William Fryer Harvey's short story "The Beast with Five Fingers". Quentin's torture is inspired by Edgar Allan Poe's short story "The Pit and the Pendulum."

The Creation of Amanda Harris, episode 812 to 850

The theme of an artist falling in love with his own creation who is brought to life by supernatural forces is reminiscent of the classic Greek myth of Pygmalion.

Josette's Return, episode 844 to 885

Count Petofi Body Swaps with Quentin, episode 849 to 883

The character of Count Petofi is based on the real-world Count of St. Germain, a Georgian-era courtier and man of science who claimed to be, and possibly was, the son of Francis II Rákóczi. In the 19th century, Theosophist legends claimed that he attained the secret of immortality.

==== 1969/70 ====
Barnabas Falls Under the Control of the Leviathans, episode 886 to 950

This storyline is inspired by H. P. Lovecraft’s shared universe known as "The Cthulhu Mythos," and particularly by the short story "The Dunwich Horror".

The Mystery of Grant Douglas and Olivia Corey, episode 888 to 934

This storyline is inspired by the Greek mythological tale of Orpheus and Eurydice.

Chris Jennings' Werewolf Curse, episode 889 to 978

The Leviathan Child, episode 891 to 929

Jeb Hawkes the Leviathan Leader, episode 935 to 980

The Ghosts of Gerard Stiles and Daphne Harridge Haunt Collinwood, episode 1071 to 1109

This storyline is inspired by Henry James's Gothic novel The Turn of the Screw.

==== 1970 Parallel Time ====
The Death of Angelique Collins, episode 969 to 1060

This storyline is inspired by Daphne du Maurier's Gothic novel Rebecca.

Cyrus Longworth's Experiment, episode 978 to 1035

This storyline is inspired by Robert Louis Stevenson's "chilling shocker" short novel Strange Case of Dr. Jekyll and Mr. Hyde.

==== 1995 ====
The Destruction of Collinwood, episode 1061 to 1070

==== 1840 ====
Barnabas' Infatuation with Roxanne Drew, episode 1081 to 1150

The Head of Judah Zachery, episode 1117 to 1138

Judah Zachery's Possession of Gerard Stiles, episode 1139 to 1197

Quentin Collins' Witchcraft Trial, episode 1162 to 1197

==== 1841 Parallel Time ====
Bramwell Collins' and Catherine Harridge's Love Affair, episode 1186 to 1245

This storyline is inspired by Emily Brontë's Gothic novel Wuthering Heights.

The Cursed Room Lottery, episode 1194 to 1245

This storyline is inspired by Shirley Jackson's short story "The Lottery."

== Production ==
=== Casting ===
Alexandra Isles (then Alexandra Moltke), a young actress with little experience, was cast in the role of Victoria Winters, an orphan who journeys to the mysterious, fictional town of Collinsport, Maine, to unravel the mysteries of her past.

Veteran film star Joan Bennett was cast as Victoria's employer Elizabeth Collins Stoddard, a woman who had not left her home in over eighteen years. Stage actor Louis Edmonds was cast as Elizabeth's brother, a widower, Roger Collins. Another stage actress, Nancy Barrett, was cast as Elizabeth's headstrong daughter Carolyn Stoddard, and child actor David Henesy was cast as Roger's troubled son David Collins.

As production on the series continued, many new and mysterious characters, played by unfamiliar actors and actresses, were introduced. Two early cast changes brought stage actors David Ford and Thayer David into the ensemble. Thayer David would go on to play several villains over the course of the series. Michael Currie, as Constable Jonas Carter, was replaced by veteran actor Dana Elcar, as Sheriff George Patterson. Most of the actors played multiple characters, and those characters often returned through flashbacks, through the use of parallel timelines, or as ghosts.

==== Main cast ====
Character names noted with * indicates appearance of a counterpart in an alternate reality known as Parallel Time during episodes 969 to 1060 or 1186 to 1245.

| Actor | Character(s) | Episodes | Years | | | | | |
| Actor | Character(s) | Episodes | 1966 | 1967 | 1968 | 1969 | 1970 | 1971 |
|---|---|---|---|---|---|---|---|---|
| Joan Bennett | Elizabeth Collins Stoddard*; Naomi Collins; Judith Collins Trask; Flora Collins* | 391 | 1 to 1245 | | | | | |
| Louis Edmonds | Roger Collins*; Joshua Collins*; Edward Collins; Daniel Collins; Amadeus Collins; Brutus Collins | 323 | 1 to 1245 | | | | | |
| Kathryn Leigh Scott | Maggie Evans*; Josette DuPres Collins (Note: Parallel counterpart played by Mary Cooper during episodes 1206 to 1238.); Rachel Drummond; Kitty Soames | 310 | 1 to 1108 | | | | | |
| Alexandra Moltke | Victoria Winters #1 (Note: Played by Betsy Durkin during episodes 630 to 650; and Carolyn Groves during episodes 662 to 665.) | 334 | 1 to 627 | | | | | |
| Mitchell Ryan | Burke Devlin #1 | 107 | 1 to 248 | | | | | |
| Nancy Barrett | Carolyn Stoddard (Note: Played by Diana Walker during episode 578.); Millicent Collins; Charity Trask; Pansy Faye; Leticia Faye; Melanie Collins; Amanda Collins | 408 | 2 to 1245 | | | | | |
| Joel Crothers | Joe Haskell; Nathan Forbes | 166 | 2 to 666 | | | | | |
| Frank Schofield | Bill Malloy | 15 | 3 to 126 | | | | | |
| David Henesy | David Collins*; Daniel Collins; Jamison Collins; Tad Collins | 277 | 4 to 1165 | | | | | |
| David Ford | Sam Evans #2 (Note: Played by Mark Allen during episodes 5 to 22.); Andre DuPres | 108 | 35 to 530 | | | | | |
| Thayer David | Matthew Morgan #2 (Note: Played by George Mitchell during episodes 6 to 16.); Ben Stokes*; Timothy Eliot Stokes*; Sandor Rakosi; Andreas Petofi; Mordecai Grimes | 225 | 38 to 1245 | | | | | |
| Dana Elcar | George Patterson #1 (Note: Played by Vince O'Brien in episode 328, and episodes 503 to 533 & 658 to 675; Angus Cairns during episodes 341 and 342; and Alfred Sandor during episode 615.) | 35 | 54 to 329 | | | | | |
| Clarice Blackburn | Sarah Johnson; Abigail Collins; Minerva Trask | 79 | 67 to 1104 | | | | | |
| Conard Fowkes | Frank Garner | 19 | 92 to 180 | | | | | |
| Diana Millay | Laura Collins | 61 | 123 to 191 | | | 730 to 760 | | |
| Vince O'Brien | Lt. Dan Riley #2 (Note: Played by John Connell during episodes 143 and 144.); George Patterson #2 | 10 | | 148 to 174, 328, 503 to 533 & 658 to 675 | | | | |
| John Lasell | Peter Guthrie | 25 | | 160 to 186 | | | | |
| John Harkins | Lieutenant Costa; Garth Blackwood; Mr. Strack; Horace Gladstone | 16 | | 174 | | 878 to 1010 | | |
| Dennis Patrick | Jason McGuire; Paul Stoddard #2 (Note: Paul Stoddard played by Joel Fabiani in episode 271, when Dennis Patrick was playing Jason McGuire.) | 66 | | 193 to 276 | | 888 to 953 | | |
| John Karlen | Willie Loomis #2 (Note: Played by James Hall during episodes 199 to 205.); Carl Collins; Desmond Collins; Kendrick Young | 180 | | 206 to 1245 | | | | |
| Jonathan Frid | Barnabas Collins; Bramwell Collins | 593 | | 211 to 1245 | | | | |
| Robert Gerringer | Dr. Dave Woodard (Note: Played by Richard Woods during episodes 219 and 229; and Peter Turgeon during episodes 335 to 362.) | 29 | | 231 to 334 | | | | |
| Sharon Smyth | Sarah Collins | 37 | | 255 to 415 | | | | |
| Anthony George | Burke Devlin #2; Jeremiah Collins | 48 | | 262 to 384 | | | | |
| Grayson Hall | Julia Hoffman*; Natalie DuPres; Magda Rakosi; Julia Collins; Constance Collins | 474 | | 265 to 1245 | | | | |
| Jerry Lacy | Tony Peterson; Reverend Trask; Gregory Trask; Mr. Trask; Lamar Trask | 109 | | 357 to 1198 | | | | |
| Lara Parker | Angelique Bouchard Collins*; Alexis Stokes; Catherine Harridge; Cassandra Blair Collins | 269 | | 368 to 1245 | | | | |
| Addison Powell | Judge Matigan; Eric Lang; Judge Wiley | 39 | | | 404 to 543 | | 1162 | |
| Roger Davis | Peter Bradford; Jeff Clark; Ned Stuart; Dirk Wilkins; Charles Delaware Tate; Harrison Monroe | 128 | | | 404 to 968 | | | |
| Craig Slocum | Noah Gifford; Harry Johnson #1 (Note: Played by Edward Marshall during episode 669.) | 17 | | | 439 to 659 | | | |
| Robert Rodan | Adam | 78 | | | 485 to 636 | | | |
| Humbert Allen Astredo | Nicholas Blair; Evan Hanley; Charles Dawson | 100 | | | 521 to 1196 | | | |
| Don Briscoe | Tom Jennings; Chris Jennings*; Tim Shaw; Chris Collins | 96 | | | 554 to 1001 | | | |
| Marie Wallace | Eve; Jenny Collins; Megan Todd | 64 | | | 596 to 971 | | | |
| Denise Nickerson | Amy Jennings*; Nora Collins; Amy Collins | 71 | | | 632 to 1049 | | | |
| David Selby | Quentin Collins II*; Quentin Collins I* | 311 | | | 646 to 1230 | | | |
| Terry Crawford | Beth Chavez; Edith Collins | 63 | | | 646 to 1186 | | | |
| Lisa Richards | Sabrina Stuart* | 28 | | | 692 to 1033 | | | |
| Michael Stroka | Aristede; Bruno Hess*; Laszlo Ferrari | 64 | | | | 791 to 1158 | | |
| Donna McKechnie | Amanda Harris; Olivia Corey | 24 | | | | 812 to 934 | | |
| Christopher Bernau | Philip Todd | 23 | | | | 888 to 968 | | |
| Geoffrey Scott | Sky Rumson | 13 | | | | | 923 to 980 | |
| Christopher Pennock | Jeb Hawkes; Cyrus Longworth; Sebastian Shaw; Gabriel Collins* | 126 | | | | | 935 to 1237 | |
| Elizabeth Eis | Nelle Gunston; Buffie Harrington; Mildred Ward | 15 | | | | | 951 to 1161 | |
| Donna Wandrey | Roxanne Drew* | 34 | | | | | 1039 to 1177 | |
| James Storm | Gerard Stiles* | 81 | | | | | 1063 to 1209 | |
| Kathy Cody | Carrie Stokes*; Hallie Stokes | 49 | | | | | 1066 to 1237 | |
| Kate Jackson | Daphne Harridge* | 70 | | | | | 1067 to 1238 | |
| Virginia Vestoff | Samantha Drew Collins* | 29 | | | | | 1110 to 1193 | |
| Lee Beery | Joanna Mills | 11 | | | | | 1181 to 1193 | |
| Keith Prentice | Morgan Collins; James Forsythe | 40 | | | | | | 1186 to 1245 |

=== Locations ===
Both theatrical films, House of Dark Shadows (1970) and Night of Dark Shadows (1971), were shot primarily on location at the Lyndhurst estate in Tarrytown, New York. For the TV series, Essex, Connecticut was the locale used for the town of Collinsport. Among the locations sited there are the Collinsport Wharf, Main Street, and the Evans Cottage. The Griswold Inn in Essex was used for the Collinsport Inn, and the town post office was used for the Collinsport Police Station. The Collinwood stand-in mansion used for the TV series is the Carey Mansion in Newport, Rhode Island, until August 2009 used by Salve Regina University. The exteriors for the "Old House," aka Collins House (the original Collinwood mansion) were filmed at Spratt Mansion, which was also located on the Lyndhurst estate; this mansion was destroyed by fire in 1969. The Lockwood-Mathews Mansion in South Norwalk, Connecticut, was also used for some scenes in House of Dark Shadows. The mausoleum shots for House of Dark Shadows were filmed in the famous Sleepy Hollow Cemetery, not far from the Lyndhurst Mansion.

All of the interiors of the TV series were shot on sound stages at various ABC-owned studios in Manhattan. The early episodes were shot at ABC Studio TV-2 at 24 West 67th Street, and the rest of the episodes were shot at the smaller ABC Studio TV-16 at 433 West 53rd Street, now demolished.

=== Music ===
Of particular note is Robert Cobert's music score, which broke new ground for a television program. In September 1969, the original soundtrack to Dark Shadows, credited to the Robert Cobert Orchestra and featuring 16 tracks written or co-written by Cobert, reached no. 18 on the Billboard 200 album chart. The song "Quentin's Theme" earned Cobert a nomination for the Grammy Award for Best Instrumental Theme, but lost to John Barry's theme for Midnight Cowboy at the 12th Annual Grammy Awards. A recording of "Quentin's Theme" by the Charles Randolph Grean Sounde was released as a single, and in August 1969, when the TV series was something of a phenomenon, it peaked at no. 13 on the Billboard Hot 100 chart, no. 3 on its Easy Listening chart, and no. 5 for 3 weeks in Canada.

== Reception ==
=== Critical response ===
Dark Shadows had a rocky beginning. While the series was dripping with gothic atmosphere from the start, critics were quick to deem the series boring for its heavy use of unknown actress Alexandra Moltke as Victoria Winters, and the slow pace. Variety, in its review on June 29, 1966, of the first episode of Dark Shadows said "Writer Art Wallace took so much time getting into his story that the first episode of the Neo Gothic soaper added up to one big contemporary yawn." The first 50 episodes concerned menacing but unfulfilled conflicts, threatened revenge, an attempted murder, and, finally, a murder. The supernatural elements that later made the series a hit were slow to appear, and were only hinted at originally. Examples of early supernatural elements were in episode 52 when a book containing the late Josette DuPres Collins moved by itself, in episodes 70 and 102 when Josette's portrait in the old Collinwood house sees her ghost move out of the portrait and start walking around, in episode 85 when the late Bill Malloy's ghost appears and talks to Victoria Winters in a locked room in a disused part of the main Collinwood house, the slow reveal of Laura Collins as a phoenix from episodes 123 to 191, and then Willie Loomis unwittingly releasing the vampire Barnabas Collins from his coffin after 170 years at the end of episode 210. Around 250–275 episodes into the series, notably after the departure of Mitchell Ryan as Burke Devlin #1, the series fully transitioned to its familiar supernatural elements, and the grounded elements that were so dominant in the earlier episodes quickly faded.

=== Audience and Fandom ===
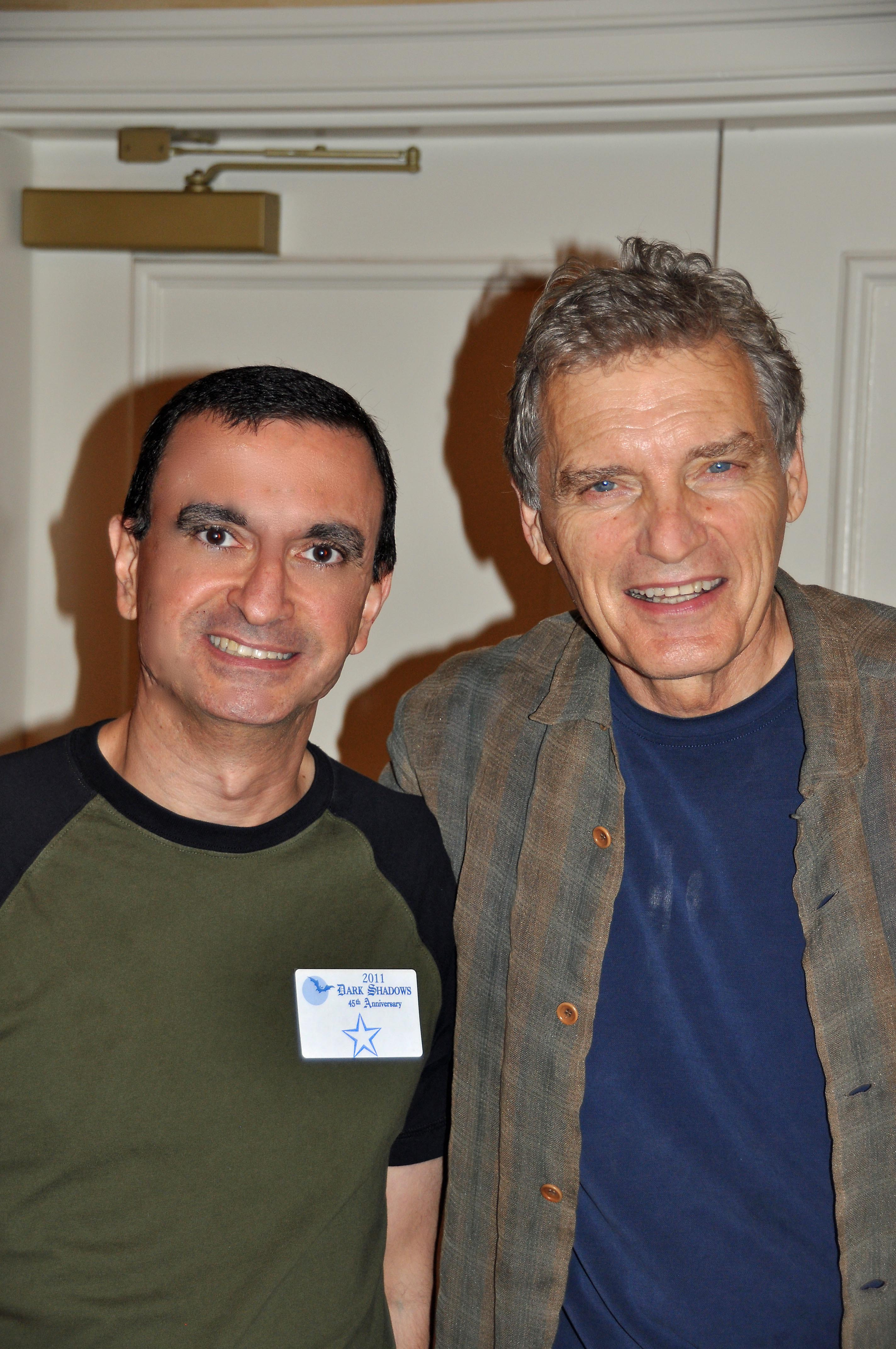
David Selby at The Dark Shadows Festival

Dark Shadows developed a broad and dedicated viewership, despite receiving mixed reviews during its original broadcast. Teenagers and college students made up a notable portion of the fanbase, often organizing their schedules around the show. The series also found a loyal audience among housewives, retirees, and genre fans, particularly due to its late-afternoon timeslot. Scholars have suggested that the show's appeal stemmed from its unique combination of gothic romance and horror, which resonated with both young and traditional daytime television viewers. Contemporary media accounts highlighted the show's popularity with younger demographics, and reviewers at the time noted its distinct tone. Over the decades, the fan community has remained active, organizing conventions, producing fanzines, and sustaining online discussion forums. The annual Dark Shadows Festival continues to be a centerpiece of fan activity.

=== Ratings ===
==== 1965–1966 season ====
- 1. As the World Turns (13.9)
- 13. Dark Shadows (4.1)
- 16. Never Too Young (3.9)

==== 1966–1967 season ====
- 1. As the World Turns (12.7)
- 12. Dark Shadows (4.3)
- 13. A Flame in the Wind (4.0)

==== 1967–1968 season ====
- 1. As the World Turns (13.6)
- 12. Dark Shadows (7.3)
- 13. One Life to Live (4.3)

==== 1968–1969 season ====
- 1. As the World Turns (13.8)
- 11. Dark Shadows (8.4)
- 14. Hidden Faces (3.3)

==== 1969–1970 season ====
- 1. As the World Turns (13.6)
- 12. Dark Shadows (7.3)
- 19. The Best of Everything (1.8)

==== 1970–1971 season ====
- 1. As the World Turns (12.4)
- 16. Dark Shadows (5.3)
- 18. A World Apart (3.4)

== Media ==
=== Home media ===
Unlike some other soap operas of its era, the episodes of Dark Shadows all were preserved in some format, although one episode exists only as an audio recording and several color episodes only have black and white kinescopes available.

MPI Home Video currently holds the home media rights to the series. All episodes were issued on VHS from 1989 through 1995. Episodes 210–1245 (Barnabas Collins' arrival through to the end of the series) have been released on DVD in 26 Collections from 2002 through 2006. Episodes 1–209 were released in 2007 under the title of Dark Shadows: The Beginning. On April 3, 2012, MPI re-released the 32 Collections. The first (and sometimes, the second) collection (from Barnabas's introduction) has been released internationally, but due to generally low sales, this has been the extent of the international release of the series.

On April 10, 2012, MPI released a "Limited Edition Complete Series" box set in the shape of a coffin. The 131 DVDs are housed in 22 individual plastic cases, with the spines looking upward to show the entire body of Barnabas lying asleep in his coffin. Only 2,500 numbered copies of these were made, with each set including a limited edition card signed by original series star Jonathan Frid. A similar but unlimited "Deluxe Edition" set was subsequently released on July 10, 2012, without the limited edition card signed by Jonathan Frid and without the serial limitation number plate on the bottom of the box.

On July 25, 2026, it was announced that MPI had begun remastering the series in HD, and would release episodes 210-240 on Blu-ray as Dark Shadows: Volume 1. Additional releases were expected to follow.

=== Films ===
MGM released a feature film titled House of Dark Shadows in 1970. Dan Curtis directed it, and Sam Hall and Gordon Russell wrote the screenplay. Rather than a spinoff, the film was an adaptation and expansion of the popular Barnabas Collins' storyline. Many cast members from the soap opera, including Jonathan Frid, Grayson Hall, Roger Davis, and Kathryn Leigh Scott, reprised their roles. 1971 saw the release of Night of Dark Shadows, also directed by Dan Curtis and written by Curtis and Sam Hall, which adapted Quentin and Angelique Collins' storyline. Actors included David Selby, Grayson Hall, Kate Jackson, and Lara Parker, among others.

During the filming of House of Dark Shadows in 1970, several actors were written out of the TV series so that they would be available to shoot the movie. Kathryn Leigh Scott was absent from 30 episodes (986 to 1015); Jonathan Frid was absent from 28 episodes (983 to 1010); Grayson Hall was absent from 21 episodes (986 to 1006); John Karlen was absent from 21 episodes (990 to 1010); Nancy Barrett was absent from 20 episodes (991 to 1010): Louis Edmonds was absent from 17 episodes (991 to 1008); Don Briscoe was absent from 15 episodes (986 to 1000); Joan Bennett was absent from 15 episodes (991 to 1006); and David Henesy was absent from 9 episodes (993 to 1001).

=== Novels ===
There have been two series of Dark Shadows novels. The first, released during the show's original run, were all penned by romance writer Marilyn Ross, a pseudonym for author Dan Ross, and were published by Paperback Library. Ross also wrote a novelization of the theatrical film House of Dark Shadows.

| No. | Title | Release date | Notes |
|---|---|---|---|
| 1 | Dark Shadows | December 1966 | A partial re-telling of Victoria Winters' arrival in Collinsport. Originally printed with an illustrated cover, subsequent editions featured a photographic cover featuring Alexandra Moltke with Jonathan Frid, although the character of Barnabas Collins does not appear in the book. This is also the case with books 2 to 4. Collinwood is referred to here as Collins House. |
| 2 | Victoria Winters | March 1967 | |
| 3 | Strangers at Collins House | September 1967 | Partially takes place in 1916. |
| 4 | The Mystery of Collinwood | January 1968 | |
| 5 | The Curse of Collinwood | May 1968 | The only book in series not to be printed with a purely photographic cover, and the first to feature Barnabas Collins (who does not appear in the book) on the cover. The cover features a photo of Jonathan Frid as Barnabas superimposed over the illustrated cover art from Dark Shadows. |
| 6 | Barnabas Collins | November 1968 | First book to feature Barnabas Collins. In the television series Barnabas was chained to his coffin in 1796 and not released until 1967; here Ross offers an alternate timeline in which the vampire was never held captive at all. Takes place in the early 1900s. |
| 7 | The Secret of Barnabas Collins | January 1969 | Takes place in 1870. |
| 8 | The Demon of Barnabas Collins | April 1969 | The first book to present Barnabas in a heroic vein rather than as the villain, following the trend set by the television series. |
| 9 | The Foe of Barnabas Collins | July 1969 | Features the character of Chris Jennings, although presented here as a villain rather than the sympathetic victim depicted in the television series. It also features a rare appearance by Angelique. Takes place in 1910. |
| 10 | The Phantom and Barnabas Collins | September 1969 | Takes place in 1880. |
| 11 | Barnabas Collins vs. the Warlock | October 1969 | A homage to Henry James' 1898 novella The Turn of the Screw, a text also used in the television series for inspiration. |
| 12 | The Peril of Barnabas Collins | November 1969 | |
| 13 | Barnabas Collins and the Mysterious Ghost | January 1970 | |
| 14 | Barnabas Collins and Quentin's Demon | February 1970 | Introduces the character of Quentin Collins to the range. Takes place in 1895. |
| 15 | Barnabas Collins and the Gypsy Witch | March 1970 | Takes place in the 1890s. |
| 16 | Barnabas, Quentin and the Mummy's Curse | April 1970 | |
| 17 | Barnabas, Quentin and the Avenging Ghost | May 1970 | |
| 18 | Barnabas, Quentin and the Nightmare Assassin | June 1970 | Takes place in 1870. |
| 19 | Barnabas, Quentin and the Crystal Coffin | July 1970 | A homage to Edgar Allan Poe's 1844 short story "The Premature Burial", a text also used in the television series for inspiration. |
| 20 | Barnabas, Quentin and the Witch's Curse | August 1970 | Takes place in 1900. |
| 21 | Barnabas, Quentin and the Haunted Cave | September 1970 | Takes place in 1690. |
| 22 | Barnabas, Quentin and the Frightened Bride | October 1970 | Takes place in 1920. |
| | House of Dark Shadows | October 1970 | Novelization. Several scenes cut from the film version were included. It also featured 16 pages of black and white photos from the film's production. |
| 23 | Barnabas, Quentin and the Scorpio Curse | November 1970 | |
| 24 | Barnabas, Quentin and the Serpent | December 1970 | Takes place in 1870. |
| 25 | Barnabas, Quentin and the Magic Potion | January 1971 | This story marks a sudden shift in the characterization of Quentin Collins, who up to this point in the range had been portrayed as an enemy of Barnabas. |
| 26 | Barnabas, Quentin and the Body Snatchers | February 1971 | This is the only book in the series told in the omniscient point of view. It also features a rare appearance by Julia Hoffman. As suggested by its title, a homage to Jack Finney's 1955 science fiction novel The Body Snatchers. |
| 27 | Barnabas, Quentin and Dr. Jekyll's Son | April 1971 | As suggested by its title, a homage to Robert Louis Stevenson's 1886 novella Strange Case of Dr Jekyll and Mr. Hyde, a text also used in the television series for inspiration. Takes place in 1908. |
| 28 | Barnabas, Quentin and the Grave Robbers | June 1971 | Takes place in 1930. |
| 29 | Barnabas, Quentin and the Sea Ghost | August 1971 | Features a rare appearance by Julia Hoffman and Professor Timothy Eliot Stokes. |
| 30 | Barnabas, Quentin and the Mad Magician | October 1971 | |
| 31 | Barnabas, Quentin and the Hidden Tomb | December 1971 | Takes place in 1866. |
| 32 | Barnabas, Quentin and the Vampire Beauty | March 1972 | |
| | The Secret of Victoria Winters | 1993 | Novella by Craig Hamrick. Story by Dan "Marilyn" Ross. |

The second series of novels were written by Lara Parker, Stephen Mark Rainey, and Elizabeth Massie.

| # | Title | Release Date | Author(s) |
|---|---|---|---|
| 1 | Angelique's Descent | December 1998 | Lara Parker |
| 2 | Dreams of the Dark | October 1999 | Stephen Mark Rainey and Elizabeth Massie; Introduction by Lara Parker |
| | The Labyrinth of Souls | 2002 | Stephen Mark Rainey; Self published. Available in e-format. |
| 3 | The Salem Branch | July 2006 | Lara Parker |
| 4 | Wolf Moon Rising | August 2013 | Lara Parker |
| 5 | Heiress of Collinwood | November 2016 | Lara Parker |

=== Other books ===
| Title | Release Date | Notes |
|---|---|---|
| Barnabas Collins in a Funny Vein | December 1969 | Joke book. |
| Dark Shadows Cookbook | 1970 | Non-fiction cookbook compiled by Jody Cameron Malis |
| The Dark Shadows Book of Vampires and Werewolves | August 1970 | Collection of short stories. |
| Barnabas Collins: A Personal Picture Album | December 1970 | Non-fiction book. |
| My Scrapbook Memories of Dark Shadows | December 1986 | Non-fiction book by Kathryn Leigh Scott. |
| Dark Shadows in the Afternoon | July 1991 | Non-fiction book by Kathleen Resch |
| The Dark Shadows Companion: 25th Anniversary Collection | January 1993 | Non-fiction book by Kathryn Leigh Scott. |
| The Dark Shadows Program Guide | 1995 | Non-fiction book compiled by Ann Wilson |
| The Dark Shadows Almanac: 30th Anniversary Tribute | August 1995 | Non-fiction book by Kathryn Leigh Scott. |
| The Dark Shadows Collectibles Book | 1998 | Non-fiction book by Craig Hamrick. |
| The Dark Shadows Movie Book | July 1998 | Non-fiction book by Kathryn Leigh Scott. |
| The Dark Shadows Almanac: Millennium Edition | 2000 | Non-fiction book by Kathryn Leigh Scott |
| Dark Shadows 35th Anniversary Memories | May 2001 | Non-fiction book by Kathryn Leigh Scott. |
| Barnabas & Company: The Cast of the TV Classic Dark Shadows | August 2003 | Non-fiction book by Craig Hamrick and R.J. Jamison. |
| Dark Shadows: The First Year | 2006 | Non-fiction book compiled by Jim Pierson, Nina Johnson, O. Crock and Sy Tomashoff |
| Dark Shadows: Return to Collinwood | April 2012 | Non-fiction book by Kathryn Leigh Scott. |
| The Collins Family Album | October 2026 | 60th-anniversary celebration by Rich Handley, announced in June 2026. |

=== Magazines ===
During its original run, Dark Shadows was featured in many magazines, including Afternoon TV, Castle of Frankenstein, Daytime TV, and Famous Monsters of Filmland. Even after the show ended, it received coverage in genre magazines of the 1970s, like Monsters of the Movies.

In 2003, a two-part article titled "Collecting Dark Shadows: Return to Collinwood", written by Rod Labbe, appeared in Autograph Collector magazine; it was the first major article to chronicle the show in years. In 2005, Scary Monsters Magazine devoted an entire issue (#55) to Dark Shadows. Included were full-length interviews with cast members Marie Wallace, David Selby, and Kathryn Leigh-Scott, as well as "Don't Open That Coffin! A Baby Boomer's Adventures in the Land of Dark Shadows!" Both the Autograph Collector and Scary Monsters articles were penned by freelance writer Rod Labbe, who once ran a fan club for Dennis Patrick (Jason McGuire, Paul Stoddard) in 1969–70.

Labbe also contributes to Fangoria magazine and is did a series of full-length interviews with surviving original cast members, leading up to the release of the 2012 film. Labbe's interview with Jerry Lacy, who played the nefarious Reverend Trask, appeared in issue #296. His second, with Kathryn Leigh Scott, was in issue #304. The latest, a Chris Pennock (Jeb Hawkes, a.k.a. "The Leviathan") profile, ran in issue #310. He also interviewed Marie Wallace (Eve and Jenny Collins). A lengthier version of Scott's interview can be found on her website.

=== Comics ===
Detail from Dark Shadows newspaper comic strip. Art by Ken Bald

From March 14, 1971, to March 11, 1972, the Newspaper Enterprise Association syndicated a Dark Shadows comic strip by illustrator Kenneth Bruce Bald (credited as "K. Bruce" because of contractual obligations) to dozens of newspapers across the United States. In 1996, Pomegranate Press, Ltd. published Dark Shadows: The Comic Strip Book (ISBN 0-938817-39-6), which collected the entire 52-week run of the daily and Sunday strip.

Gold Key Comics released 35 issues of a regular Dark Shadows comic book, mostly written by John Warner, which ran for years after the cancellation of the series on ABC (1969–1976). George Wilson drew several covers for the comic book series. In 1991, Innovation Publishing released a short-lived comic book series based on the NBC-TV revival show. Hermes Press has released a five-volume archive reprint series of the Gold Key series in 2010–2011. Additionally, Dynamite Entertainment launched a new monthly series of Dark Shadows comic books in October 2011.

=== Other media ===
There have also been bubble gum cards, fake vampire teeth, model kits, two board games, a few coloring books, two jigsaw puzzles, and a View-Master reel.

=== Syndication ===
Due to an FCC rule prohibiting networks from keeping their syndication holdings, it wasn't until 1975 that the ABC-spun Worldvision Enterprises released 130 episodes to syndication. Eventually, all but the pre-Barnabas and approximately the last year's episodes were part of the package. During the 1980s, PBS was heavily involved in rebroadcasting the series. In 1992, the cable network the Sci-Fi Channel (now Syfy) acquired the entire run of episodes. The channel stopped airing Dark Shadows in 2003.

Online streaming site Netflix carried the series previous to 2012, but then dropped all but 160 episodes. The series was completely removed in early 2014. In June 2012, episodes 210-249 of Dark Shadows, covering the introduction of Barnabas Collins, were made available for streaming online video on Hulu, then a free service like YouTube. In October 2013, 200 episodes were offered on Hulu Plus, the new Hulu subscription service. As of April 2015, the non-subscription part of the service was discontinued and some of it was merged into the subscription side, dropping the Hulu Plus title and going by simply Hulu. After several years, the series was removed as of the summer of 2020.

Both the original soap opera and prime-time versions have aired on the Decades TV Network. Decades was known for its Halloween marathons of the show throughout the late 2010s that the network called The Binge. In 2018, 260 episodes of the program started airing at 12AM ET/11PM Central on weeknights. The MPI Media Group, who has the rights to the show's distribution, started a pay streaming service dedicated specifically to the program in October 2017. In January 2018, Amazon Prime was the first streaming service to carry every episode at once. However, in late 2019 it moved to the site's IMDb TV Channel accompanied by commercials. The free ad-supported Tubi TV acquired rights to all 1,225 episodes in January 2020 and in September, the similar Pluto TV added a Dark Shadows channel.

=== Audio drama ===
Based on a 2003 stage play performed at a Dark Shadows convention, Return to Collinwood is an audio drama written by Jamison Selby, produced by Jamison Selby and Jim Pierson, and starring David Selby, Kathryn Leigh Scott, John Karlen, Nancy Barrett, Lara Parker, Roger Davis, Marie Wallace, Christopher Pennock, Donna Wandrey, James Storm, and Terry Crawford. The show is available on CD.

==== Big Finish Productions ====
In 2006, Big Finish Productions continued the Dark Shadows saga with an original series of audio dramas, starring the original cast. The first season featured David Selby (Quentin Collins), Lara Parker (Angelique), Kathryn Leigh Scott (Maggie Evans), and John Karlen (Willie Loomis). Robert Rodan, who played Adam in the original series, also appears in the fourth story, playing a new character. Barnabas Collins is played by Andrew Collins. A second series was released in 2010. In addition to the cast's returning from Series One, Kingdom of the Dead also featured Lysette Anthony, Alec Newman, Lizzie Hopley, Jerry Lacy, and David Warner. Big Finish has also produced a series of dramatic story readings based on the series, with arguably the most notable being the 2010 release The Night Whispers, in which Jonathan Frid reprised the role of Barnabas.

In January 2015, Big Finish began releasing the full-cast Dark Shadows serial Bloodlust in twice-weekly installments, as to emulate the initial soap opera format of the show.

== Legacy and cultural impact ==
=== Cultural significance ===
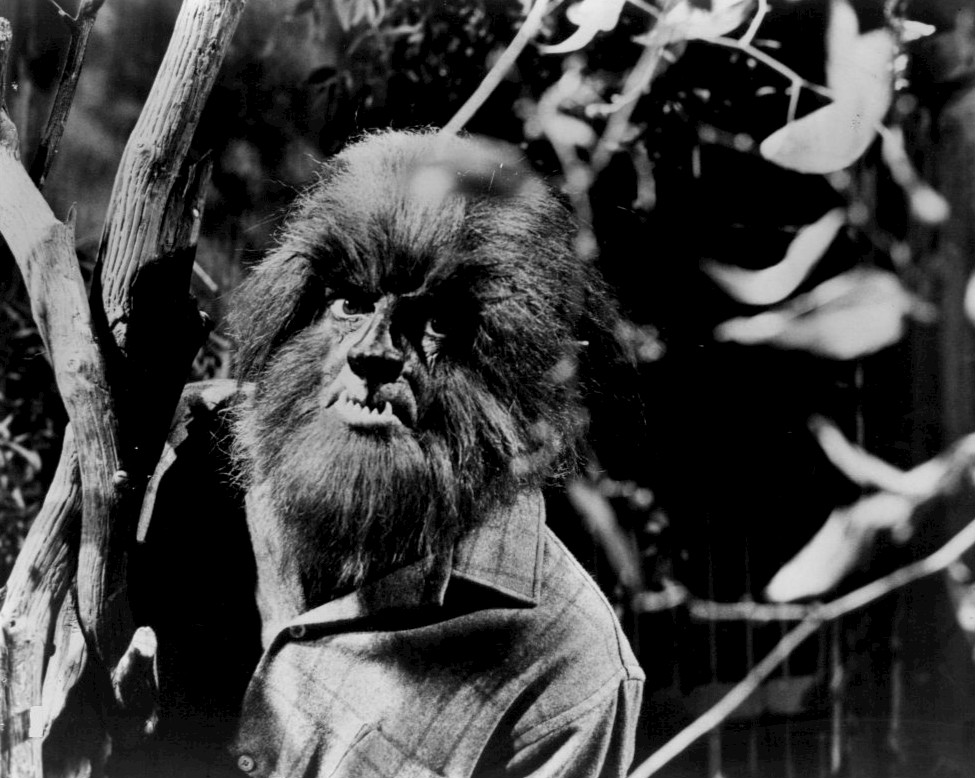
Werewolf in Dark Shadows

Dark Shadows is noted for introducing gothic horror themes into the traditionally domestic setting of the daytime soap opera. The series featured supernatural elements such as vampires, werewolves, witches, and time travel. These unconventional elements helped distinguish the show from other daytime television programs during the 1960s, contributing to its reputation as a cult television phenomenon. Scholars have highlighted the show's role in bringing "monster culture" into the home, and have praised its overall intricate world-building, which has been credited with influencing serialized storytelling in later genre television. Scholars have noted that the narrative engaged with psychological themes such as identity, trauma, repression, and guilt—most prominently through the character of Barnabas Collins. The shows blending of horror and melodrama elements has been read as a metaphor for Cold War-era social tensions and changing cultural norms of the time.

=== Influence on genre television ===
The narrative structure and genre-blending approach of Dark Shadows have been cited as influential in shaping modern television. The series' use of long-form serialized storytelling, and its integration of horror and melodramatic elements were precursors to elements now common in contemporary television series. Dark Shadows emphasis on character-driven horror within a serialized framework served as a template for various cult and fantasy television series. Scholars have pointed to its lasting impact on shows such as Buffy the Vampire Slayer, The Vampire Diaries, Supernatural, and American Horror Story, all of which build on the format and tone pioneered by Dark Shadows.

=== Lasting impact and revivals ===
Dark Shadows' dramatic and theatrical aesthetic contributed to its long enduring cultural presence. The show's distinctive tone, often marked by its visible low-cost production quirks, became part of its charm and overall identity. Reviews from the time acknowledged its suspenseful atmosphere and visual departure from other daytime serials. While some critics dismissed it as overly dramatic, its stylistic boldness and genre experimentation helped foster a strong fanbase. Over time, the contrast between its critical reception and audience loyalty became central to its cult status. The series has inspired several revivals, including a 1991 remake, a 2004 TV pilot, and a 2012 film adaptation.

Dark Shadows- The Revival 1991 logo

==== 1991 TV series ====
In 1991, MGM Television produced a short-lived prime-time remake that aired on NBC from January 13 to March 22. The revival was a lavish, big-budget, weekly serial combining Gothic romance and stylistic horror. Although it was a huge hit at its introduction (watched by almost 1 in 4 households, according to official ratings during that time period), the onset of the Gulf War caused NBC to continually preempt or reschedule the episodes, resulting in declining ratings. It was canceled after the first season. The final episode ended with a cliffhanger: Victoria Winters (Joanna Going)'s learning that Barnabas Collins (Ben Cross) was a 200-year-old vampire.

It also starred veterans Jean Simmons (as Elizabeth Collins Stoddard), Roy Thinnes (as Roger Collins), Lysette Anthony (as Angelique Collins), Barbara Steele (as Julia Hoffman), and Joseph Gordon-Levitt (as David Collins).

==== 2004 TV pilot ====
Plans for another revival series (or film) have been discussed off and on since the 1991 series' demise, including a TV miniseries to wrap up the plotlines of the canceled NBC series and a feature film, co-written by Dan Curtis and Barbara Steele, utilizing the 1991 cast. In 2004, a pilot for a new WB network Dark Shadows series, starring Marley Shelton as Victoria Winters and Alec Newman as Barnabas Collins, was written and shot, but never picked up. The pilot has been screened at the Dark Shadows Festival conventions with Dan Curtis Productions' blessing, and it can now be found online. This pilot was produced by Warner Bros. Television.

==== 2012 film ====
In 2012, Warner Bros. produced a film adaptation of the soap opera. Tim Burton directed the film, and Johnny Depp, finally realizing one of his childhood fantasies, starred as Barnabas Collins. However, the film treated the stories comedically, and was not the hoped-for major success.

==== Reincarnation ====
In September 2019, it was announced that The CW and Warner Bros. Television were developing a continuation of the original series called Dark Shadows: Reincarnation, written by Mark B. Perry. Perry would also serve as executive producer along with Amasia Entertainment's Michael Helfant, Bradley Gallo and Tracy Mercer, as well as Tracy and Cathy Curtis. Perry said, "As a first-generation fan, it's been a dream of mine to give Dark Shadows the Star Trek treatment since way back in the '80s when Next Generation was announced, so I'm beyond thrilled and humbled to be entrusted with this resurrection." In November 2020, TVLine reported that the series was no longer in development. In August 2021, Perry revealed that the project was retooled with the intention to shop it to networks again.

==== Animated series ====
On June 26, 2026, it was announced that an adult animated reboot of the series is currently in development.

== See also ==
- List of vampire television series
- Strange Paradise
