= Louis Edmonds =

American actor

- Born: Louis Stirling Edmonds; September 24, 1923; Baton Rouge, Louisiana, US
- Died: March 3, 2001 (aged 77); Port Jefferson, New York, US
- Occupation: Actor
- Years active: 1950-1997

Louis Stirling Edmonds (September 24, 1923 – March 3, 2001) was an American actor. He was best known for his roles in Dark Shadows and All My Children.

Edmonds appeared in the musical Ernest in Love in 1960. He acted on the supernatural soap opera Dark Shadows as Roger Collins from 1966 to 1971. His other roles on Dark Shadows were Joshua Collins, the father of Barnabas Collins (Jonathan Frid), Edward Collins, the older brother of Quentin Collins (David Selby), Roger Collins PT (Roger Collins' opposite self in 1970 Parallel Time), Joshua Collins PT (the ghost of Joshua Collins' opposite self in 1970 Parallel Time), the adult Daniel Collins (a cousin of Barnabas and Millicent Collins (Nancy Barrett)'s younger brother), Amadeus Collins, a lawyer who was the main prosecutor in the trial of Judah Zachary (Michael McGuire) in 1692, whose spirit later possesses Gerard Stiles (James Storm) in 1840, and Brutus Collins, a ghost who haunted the secret locked room in 1841 Parallel Time).

On All My Children, he played Langley Wallingford/Lenny Wlasuk from 1979 to 1991 (on contract, returning for special events up until 1995, the show's 25th anniversary special), who was married to Phoebe Tyler, portrayed by Ruth Warrick. He received nominations for the Daytime Emmy Award for Outstanding Supporting Actor in a Drama Series in 1984, 1985, and 1986. He also received Soap Opera Digest Award nominations in 1989 and 1990.

Edmonds retired from the show due to ill health after being off contract for several years. He died of respiratory failure on March 3, 2001, in Port Jefferson, New York.

== Early life ==
Louis Edmonds was born in Baton Rouge, Louisiana, on September 24, 1923, to Walter R. Edmonds and his wife, Katherine L. Stirling. He served in the United States Navy during World War II.

== Stage work ==
Edmonds began his career off-Broadway in the 1950s, appearing in mostly light comedy and classical works. He created the role of Algernon Moncrieff in Ernest in Love, the musical version of Oscar Wilde's The Importance of Being Earnest. The cast recording was reissued on CD.

He played Max in the original Broadway production of Leonard Bernstein's Candide, but due to a temporary illness, he is not heard on the cast recording. In the 1970s and 1980s, Edmonds toured in several national tours; two of the most successful were Man of La Mancha (as Miguel de Cervantes/Don Quixote) and My Fair Lady (as Henry Higgins).

== Personal life ==
Edmonds came out publicly in the biography Big Lou by Craig Hamrick, published while Edmonds was in his 70s. The actor gave details of his life as a gay man.

== Filmography ==
Year	Title	Role	Notes
1966-1971	Dark Shadows (TV Series)	Roger Collins	
1967	Come Spy with Me	Gunther Stiller	
1970	House of Dark Shadows	Roger Collins	
1980	The Exterminator	CIA Chief	
1997	Next Year in Jerusalem	Grandfather	
