= Joe Caldwell (television writer) =

American novelist and television writer (1928–2026)

- Born: Joseph Kerwin Caldwell; October 2, 1928; Milwaukee, Wisconsin, U.S.
- Died: July 13, 2026 (aged 97)
- Occupations: Novelist, television writer

Joseph Kerwin Caldwell (October 2, 1928 – July 13, 2026) was an American novelist and television writer. He wrote for television programs including NBC Matinee Theater, Strange Paradise, The Secret Storm and Dark Shadows.

Caldwell co-created the fictional character Barnabas Collins in Dark Shadows. After his debut novel, In Such Dark Places, which won the Rome Prize, he went on to write the novels The Deer at the River and Under the Dog Star, as well as the memoir Shadow of the Bridge, which described his work caring for people living with AIDS as well as his relationships with men.

Caldwell died on July 13, 2026, at the age of 97. According to his obituary from Deadline Hollywood, he was gay.
