= Exploring Minds =

Canadian television series

- Genre: Educational
- Country of origin: Canada
- Original language: English
- No. of seasons: 3

Production
- Running time: 30 minutes

Original release
- Network: CBC Television
- Release: 5 October 1953 – 15 April 1956

Exploring Minds is a Canadian educational television series that aired on CBC Television from 1953 to 1956.

== Premise ==
Lectures from various university academics throughout Canada were featured on Exploring Minds. Episodes were produced in Toronto, Vancouver and other cities with support from numerous Canadian universities.

Charles Comfort and Peter Brieger hosted a sequence of lectures on various art forms. Canada's first Prime Minister was the subject of two programmes hosted by Donald Creighton which featured John A. Macdonald portrayed by Robert Christie.

Series producers included David Walker (Toronto) and Daryl Duke (Vancouver).

== Scheduling ==
The first season of this half-hour series was broadcast on Mondays at 7:30 p.m. (Eastern) from 5 October 1953 to 19 April 1954. The second and third seasons aired Sundays at 6:00 p.m., from 3 October 1954 to 1 May 1955, then 30 October 1955 to 15 April 1956.

== Reception ==
Despite efforts such as Exploring Minds, academic programming fell out of favour at the CBC after its initial years. Conflicts arose due to producers attitudes towards creating a presentable broadcast, and the professors' lack of familiarity with the requirements of television production. In one incident, a producer recorded a scene with 12 young ballet dancers to illustrate light refraction although the professor merely wished to show a drawing of the concept.

== See also ==
- University of the Air
