= Sy Tomashoff =

American production designer and set decorator

- Born: September 11, 1922
- Died: July 28, 2019 (aged 96)

Seymour 'Sy' Tomashoff (September 11, 1922 - July 28, 2019) was an American production designer and set decorator who worked in television for over 40 years. He was born in Brooklyn, New York and was enlisted in the U.S. Army during World War II. He attended Carnegie Tech in Pittsburgh, studying architecture.

Tomashoff worked in the American gothic soap opera Dark Shadows throughout its entire run from 1966 to 1971. From its inception in 1975 until 1981, he worked in another soap Ryan's Hope. In 1987, he started working for the newly-created soap The Bold and the Beautiful, where he stayed for 13 years until his retirement at nearly 80 years old.

== Awards ==
Tomashoff won the Daytime Emmy Award seven times throughout his career, the first one in 1981.

== Personal life ==
Tomashoff was married to Naomi from 1952 until his death in 2019.

== Death ==
Tomashoff died on July 28, 2019, in Los Angeles at the age of 96.
