= Eye Opener (Canadian TV series) =

Canadian TV series

- Genre: Experimental drama
- Country of origin: Canada
- Original language: English
- No. of seasons: 1
- No. of episodes: 12

Production
- Executive producer: Mario Prizek
- Running time: 30 minutes

Original release
- Network: CBC Television
- Release: 5 January – 23 March 1965

Eye Opener is a Canadian experimental drama television series that aired on CBC Television in 1965.

== Premise ==
Experimental dramas concerning social topics were the focus of Eye Opener. Previously, experimental drama was featured on CBC's Quest series.

== Scheduling ==
This half-hour series was broadcast on Tuesdays at 10:30 p.m. (Eastern) from 5 January to 23 March 1965.

== Episodes ==
1. 5 January 1965: The Blind Eye and the Deaf Ear (Melwyn Breen producer; Leslie MacFarlane writer), concerning the Kitty Genovese murder in New York City; starring Bill Brydon, Maureen Fitzgerald, Cosette Lee, Jane Mallett, Aileen Seaton and John Vernon
2. 12 January 1965: The Black Madonna (George McCowan producer; Muriel Spark story; Barrie Hale adaptation), starring Bill Glover, Mel Scott and Hilary Vernon
3. 19 January 1965: A Borderline Case (Mario Prizek producer), starring Chicago's The Second City performers in sketches about Canada as seen by Americans
4. 2 February 1965: Hear Me Talkin' To Ya (Paddy Sampson producer; Don Francks writer; Ron Collier music), a "jazz oratorio"
5. 9 February 1965: Uhu. . . Huh? (George Bloomfield producer), included sketches by Harold Pinter and N. F. Simpson, starring Len Birman, Helen Burns and Jennifer Phipps
6. 16 February 1965: The Tulip Garden (Mario Prizek producer; George Ryga writer)
7. 23 February 1965: Blossoms, Butterflies, and Bombs, concerning war and peace, illustrated by three animated sketches
8. 2 March 1965: eastern European sketches Playthings from Poland, Boomerang from Yugoslavia and The Red Trace from Czechoslovakia
9. 2 March 1965: The Trial of Joseph Brodsky (Stan Jacobson producer and adaptation), concerning Brodsky's struggles in the Soviet Union, starring Frances Hyland, Martin Lavut and Cosette Lee
10. 9 March 1965: Sarah and the Sax (Mario Prizek producer; Lewis John Carlino writer), starring Sophia Reinglas and Mel Scott
11. 16 March 1965: The Golden Bull of Boredom (Mario Prizek producer; Lorees Yerby writer), starring Budd Knapp and Paul Massie
12. 23 March 1965: The Lonely Machine (Paddy Sampson producer; Jules Feiffer story; Sampson and Norm Symonds adaptation), based on the Feiffer cartoon, starring Rich Little

On 26 January 1965, Eye Opener was pre-empted by Wall of Ice, an hour-long documentary about a Canadian expedition to Denali.

The Dutchman, a drama on racial relations by Leroi Jones, was planned for broadcast on Eye Opener, but there was no confirmation whether this production was cancelled or televised.

== Controversy ==
The series, and its executive producer Mario Prizek, were in conflict with CBC management regarding various aspects of Eye Opener, leading to its short single season run. Several planned episodes were modified or terminated by CBC management. For example, A Borderline Case, the originally-planned debut episode of Eye Opener concerning Quebec separatism, was cancelled.

The CBC schedule did not feature an experimental drama series until 1970's Program X, other than perhaps occasional formal experimental productions on Festival.
