= Strange Paradise =

Canadian Gothic soap opera

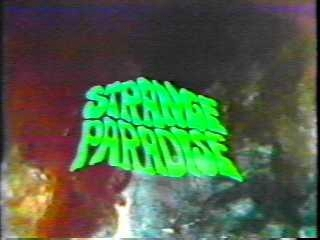
- Strange Paradise
- Created by: Jerry Layton; Ian Martin
- Starring: Colin Fox; Tudi Wiggins; Sylvia Feigel; Cosette Lee; Kurt Scheigl; Trudy Young; Lucy Warner; David Wells; Neil Dainard; Pat Moffatt
- Country of origin: Canada
- No. of episodes: 195

Production
- Running time: 30 minutes
- Production company: Krantz Films

Original release
- Network: CBC Television
- Release: 1969 – 1970

Strange Paradise is a Canadian Gothic soap opera of 195 episodes, initially launched in syndication in the United States on September 8, 1969, and later broadcast on CBC Television from October 20, 1969, to July 22, 1970. The production was the brainchild of producer Steve Krantz, in an attempt to capitalize on the phenomenal success of ABC's daytime serial Dark Shadows in America. To develop the series, Krantz hired actor-writer Ian Martin and veteran TV and radio producer Jerry Layton, both of whom were given screen credit for the creation of Strange Paradise. With the CBC and American broadcasters Metromedia and Kaiser Broadcasting handling distribution and co-production, the series was filmed in Ottawa, Ontario, at CTV affiliate CJOH-TV and aired for 39 weeks, presenting three separate 13-week story arcs.

== Series overview ==
The series’ protagonist is billionaire Jean Paul Desmond, a tragic character whose absolute refusal to accept the death of his beloved wife Erica on the remote Caribbean island of Maljardin leads him to a blasphemous defiance of God. He strikes an ill-fated bargain with the spirit of his sinister ancestor, Jacques Eloi des Mondes, which drives the story for the series’ first thirteen weeks. Other characters in the cast include Raxl and Quito, a pair of devoted and mysterious servants; Holly Marshall, a runaway heiress; Reverend Matthew Dawson, a conflicted minister; Evangeline "Vangie" Abot, a local mystic; Tim Stanton, a struggling artist; Erica's sister Allison Carr, a female doctor; Dan Forrest, an outraged business associate; and Holly's mother Elizabeth Marshall, a social-climbing widow.

After its sixty-fifth episode, Strange Paradise was substantially re-tooled, jettisoning the majority of the cast and moving its setting from the Caribbean to Desmond Hall, the family's ancestral home in North America. The stories presented in this overhauled version of the series involve the "mark of death" driving Jean Paul to murder, the disappearance of Jean Paul's brother Philip, the machinations of a witches’ coven against the Desmonds, the influence of the Serpent God at Desmond Hall, and ultimately the final showdown with the powers of darkness. The unifying thread which binds all of these elements is Jean Paul's struggle to lift the curse which plagues the Desmond family. Additional characters in the Desmond Hall cast include Jean Paul's kindly cousin Ada Thaxton and her brooding son Cort, Laszlo Thaxton, Ada's conniving second husband, Irene Hatter, the town gossip and a witch, Emily Blair, a shy researcher invited by Philip, Susan O'Clair, whose destiny and those who are around her draw her to Desmond Hall, Helena Raleigh, an actress and Erica's doppelganger, and Julien Desmond, Ada's long-lost father. The series ends with a definitive wrap-up episode, in which the fates of Raxl, the Desmonds, and the long-standing Desmond curse are revealed.

== Cast ==
Canadian actor Colin Fox was chosen to play the dual roles of Jean Paul and Jacques. Fox went on to distinguish himself in numerous roles on stage, screen and television, with memorable turns in productions ranging from Shakespeare's Macbeth to Psi Factor: Chronicles of the Paranormal. Other players in the Maljardin cast include Cosette Lee as Raxl, Kurt Schiegl as the hulking bald mute Quito, Sylvia Feigel as Holly, Dan MacDonald as Rev. Matt Dawson, Jon Granik as Dan, Paisley Maxwell as Elizabeth, Dawn Greenhalgh as Allison and Angela Roland as Vangie. Of particular note among this original cast are Bruce Gray as Tim and Tudi Wiggins as Erica, who went on to appear in a number of further daytime dramas and feature films.

The series' only original cast members to make the jump from Maljardin to Strange Paradise's Desmond Hall episodes were Colin Fox, Cosette Lee, Kurt Schiegl, Sylvia Feigel, and Tudi Wiggins (though only Fox and Lee remained with the cast to the series’ final episode). New performers cast as Desmond Hall regulars include Neil Dainard as Phillip, Pat Moffat as Irene, Jack Creley as Laslo, Peg Dixon and Jan Campbell as Ada, David Wells as Cort, Lucy Warner as Emily Blair, Vivian Reis as Agatha Pruitt, Trudy Young (who played Holly's friend Dinah in the pilot episode) as Susan and Robert Goodier as Julien Desmond.

== Production ==
=== Development ===
An early working title for the production was The Garden of Evil (a reference to the English translation of Maljardin, the name of the island upon which the series is set).

Strange Paradise was marketed to potential broadcasters via the pilot episode shot in May 1969 and an accompanying pitch reel of related scenes, referred to by Krantz Films’ staff as "the Vignettes". A few actors and characters were dropped or altered after the filming of these initial promotional pieces. Actor Paul Harding, who played the role of Dan Forrest in the pilot, declined to continue with the series and was replaced by Jon Granik. Likewise, the part of Jacques Eloi des Mondes’ wife Huaco was originated by actress Patricia Collins, but she did not join the series’ regular cast. Perhaps most significantly, actress Nonnie Griffin portrayed the pilot's Beryl Forbes, a character slated to be the Conjure Woman (a role important to the series). However, Griffin declined to participate in the continuing series, and her character was dropped entirely. Instead, the role of the Conjure Woman fell to Vangie Abbott, as portrayed by actress Angela Roland.

=== Series retooling ===
The ratings for Strange Paradise were rocky from the start, leading to a production shake-up early in the series' run. By October 8, 1969 — just a month after its American debut — the show was dropped by Metromedia stations in New York and Los Angeles, and moved into early afternoon by Kaiser stations in Philadelphia, Boston, Cleveland and Detroit.

As a result of the poor ratings, writer Ian Martin and executive producer Jerry Layton left the show after the first nine weeks of production. Layton was replaced by Robert Costello, who left his role as producer on Dark Shadows, an inspiration for Strange Paradise. Variety reported on the shakeup: "Krantz prexy Steven Krantz says the show will be beefed up with a faster pace and made 'generally better'. We will have a hit show out of this," he says, drawing a parallel with the N.Y. Mets, who started the season slow but..." (At the time of this quote, the once-lowly Mets had just won the National League Championship Series, and were on their way to the 1969 World Series, which they would also win.)

Martin had written the scripts for the first nine weeks, and after his departure, writers George Salverson, Ron Chudley and James Elward were quickly brought in to keep the continuing story afloat for a couple of weeks while a further writing staff was assembled. Cornelius Crane finished the first 13-week arc. Martin's story was scuttled so quickly that there was no time to change the promotional blurbs, which were sent out some weeks in advance to newspapers and local TV schedule listings. As a result, around November–December 1969, a number of U.S. publications carried daily descriptions of Ian Martin episodes which were never actually produced.

At the start of the second 13-week arc, the show changed focus, moving from the Caribbean island of Maljardin to Desmond Hall. Writer Cornelius Crane was joined by Ron Sproat, a former writer for Dark Shadows. Joe Caldwell (also a former Dark Shadows writer) and John R. Melmer also wrote a few episodes during this period.

For the third and final 13-week arc, Crane left the writing team, and Sproat was joined by television neophyte Harding Lemay for four weeks. Despite his inexperience, Lemay became the sole writer for the last nine weeks of the show.

=== Filming ===
Exterior shots of Maljardin Mansion were filmed at Casa Loma.

== Broadcast and syndication ==
Almost immediately following the production of Strange Paradise's final episode (while the series was still in the final weeks of its original CBC broadcast run), the serial was picked up for syndicated reruns in various markets in the U.S. Thus, it was the first soap opera to be marketed in reruns. Also in 1993, Strange Paradise found new life in the home video market, when Centaur Distribution began issuing the series on videocassette. Eventually, 21 volumes were released on VHS, encompassing the first 105 installments of the series, before the project folded. Since that time, the rights to Strange Paradise have been purchased by a group called Nihali Entertainment but, to date, no DVD release of the series has been forthcoming. However the show has remained available for broadcast in syndication since its premiere in 1969, most recently surfacing on Canada’s Drive-In Classics just in time for the series’ 35th anniversary north of the border. It aired on Drive-In Classics from October 4, 2004 to October 1, 2007.

== Influences on other projects ==
Strange Paradise has had at least a small life outside of its 195 serialized episodes. Between December 1969 and August 1970, publisher Paperback Library issued three TV tie-in novels authored by Gothic romance writer Dorothy Daniels: Strange Paradise; Island of Evil and Raxl, Voodoo Priestess.

Between 1974 and 1980, Ian Martin contributed numerous scripts to Himan Brown’s CBS Radio Mystery Theater, and many of those radio plays contained elements recognizably taken directly from his earlier writings on Strange Paradise. Chief among these efforts were his August 7, 1975, script To Die Is Forever (which is a virtual re-telling of the Maljardin story), Here Goes the Bride (February 4, 1974) and The Spectral Bride (September 26, 1974). Around 1979, Martin began adapting some of his CBS Radio Mystery Theater scripts to novel form for publisher Popular Library, and one of the scripts chosen for this treatment was Here Goes the Bride. The novel saw publication in 1980 under the title Shadow over Seventh Heaven, credited to Martin's pseudonym Joen Arliss. During the adaptation process he excised many of the elements which linked his original script with Strange Paradise; however, his earlier Joen Arliss novel Nightmare's Nest does display a few of Martin's Strange Paradise influences.

The birth of the Internet has given rise to new outlets of influence for Strange Paradise. Online, When Yahoo Groups was active, there was a group for the series, enabling fans of the series to share thoughts and messages. Likewise, individual fans have established websites to document the series and promote its fandom.

Between October 2001 and January 2002, the Nepean Museum near Ottawa, presented an exhibit celebrating the history of CJOH-TV. Among the items displayed were props and costumes from Strange Paradise, including cast photos, set designs, shooting scripts and the original conjure doll.

== See also ==
- Dark Shadows
- Seeing Things (TV series)
