= Quest (Canadian TV series) =

Canadian television series

- Also known as: Q for Quest
- Created by: Ross McLean
- Presented by: Andrew Allan (1961); Robert Whitehead (1961–64)
- Country of origin: Canada
- Original language: English
- No. of seasons: 4

Production
- Executive producers: Ross McLean (1961); Daryl Duke (1961–1964)
- Producer: Andrew Allan (1961)

Original release
- Network: CBC Television
- Release: 3 January 1961 – 10 March 1964

Related
- Eye Opener

Quest (initially titled Q for Quest) is a Canadian anthology television series that aired on CBC Television from 1961 to 1964.

== Premise ==
The series began in January 1961 as Q for Quest and featured a variety of documentaries, dramas and musical performances. The series was hosted by Andrew Allan for its first six months. Executive producer Ross McLean described the series as "a free-form exercise in the inventive use of television."

After the initial season ended in June 1961, McLean left CBC for the upstart private CTV Television Network and was replaced by Daryl Duke. Allan was replaced as host by Robert Whitehead. The series title was shortened to Quest when it began its first full season in October 1961. Episode producers included Harvey Hart, George McCowan, Mario Prizek and Whitehead.

In March 1964, Duke left the CBC to work with Steve Allen in the United States after completing an episode featuring musician Bob Dylan for Quest. That final episode of Quest was broadcast on 10 March 1964. CBC created a new experimental anthology series Eye Opener which aired from January to March 1965.

== Reception ==
Quest took an experimental and often controversial approach on the productions it aired. The presentation of Jules Feiffer's satirical play Crawling Arnold on the 4 February 1962 episode drew particularly strong public reaction. Edwin William Brunsden, a Member of Parliament, received negative correspondence to this broadcast and denounced the episode in Parliament as "depraved... disgusting... garbage... and a rank violation of the sanctity of the Canadian home and family." The suitability of Quest's subject matter for a broadcast audience was also a concern of CBC management on occasion. Ottawa-based Sock 'n' Buskin Theatre Company lodged a different complaint regarding the CBC's promotion of "Crawling Arnold" as a "North American premiere" because the theatre group began its performances of the play three days prior to the broadcast.

Alberta Member of Parliament Clifford Smallwood declared to the 25 February 1964 broadcast of "For Want of Something Better to Do" to be "corrupt and immoral". Smallwood demanded that CBC programming be approved by a House of Commons committee. Ottawa Citizen columnist Frank Penn saw little immorality in that episode, but rather that the play was a challenge to inhumanity.

CBC had received more critical letters from viewers for Quest than for any other program according to Duke during a September 1962 interview.

== Episodes ==
Weeks not listed were usually pre-empted by other programming such as extended editions of Close-Up, CBC Newsmagazine or Stanley Cup playoffs.

=== Season 1 (1961) ===
Q for Quest began as a mid-season series, airing Tuesdays at 10:30 p.m. (Eastern).

Title	Written by	Original release date
"Burlap Bags"	Len Peterson	3 January 1961
Starring Percy Rodriguez, adapted by Len Peterson from his radio play, Harvey Hart producer
"A Canvas for Conversation"	–	10 January 1961
Painter Harold Town hosted an often-fractious discussion with fellow artists Jack Nichols and William Ronald.
"An Evening without James Reaney"	–	17 January 1961
Jeremy Wilkin's solo performance of James Reaney's work, under the theme of "Life and Death in Canada". Harvey Hart was the producer.
"Josef Drenters"	–	24 January 1961
A biographical film by Allan King on Ontario farmer and sculptor Josef Drenters
"Festival In Puerto Rico"	–	7 February 1961
A documentary on Puerto Rico's Casals Festival where classical singer Maureen Forrester and her conductor husband Eugene Kash performed. This National Film Board production also features their three children who also travelled to the festival. Roman Kroitor directed this.
"For The Information of Husbands"	Anton Chekov	14 February 1961
Frances Hyland and Larry D. Mann star in this performance of Chekov's story. Adaptation by Mac Shoub, Leo Orenstein producer.
"The Blues"	–	21 February 1961
A conversation concerning blues music with Ed Bickert, Don Francks, Eve Smith, the Don Thompson Quintet; Daryl Duke producer.
"Return Journey"	–	28 February 1961
Douglas Rain and Diana Maddox perform an autobiographical play about Dylan Thomas; Paul Almond producer.
"Bikel Calling"	–	14 March 1961
A feature on performer Theodore Bikel, produced by Stan Harris.
"Mind of Mingus"	–	28 March 1961
Jazz musician Charles Mingus is featured in this special, originally recorded as a 1961 special by CBC Vancouver.
"Oscar Brown Jr."	–	11 April 1961
American musician Oscar Brown Jr. is featured.
"The World of S. J. Perelman"	–	18 April 1961
"The Wrecker"	–	9 May 1961
Charmion King, Tom Harvey, Cosette Lee and Joe Austen star in this comedy play in which a couple's apartment is destroyed.
"Lambert, Hendricks and Ross"	–	16 May 1961
A musical concert with Lambert, Hendricks and Ross, a vocal group who simulates big band instrumentals.
"Standard of Dying"	Herbert Eisenreich	23 May 1961
Drama concerning a couple set in Europe starring Charmion King and Budd Knapp, produced by Paul Almond.
"It's Harder to be Anybody"	–	30 May 1961
Talk show with Mordecai Richler concerning his writing, accompanied by performances of excerpts of his books "The Apprenticeship of Duddy Kravitz" and "It's Harder to be Anybody".
"Death in the Barren Ground"	–	6 June 1961
A drama with Douglas Rain about youths in the North attempting to survive, previously broadcast in October 1959 on Explorations.
"Katherine Mansfield"	Katherine Mansfield	13 June 1961
A dramatic reading from one of Mansfield's stories.
"The Human Voice"	–	20 June 1961
Norma Renault stars in the adaptation of a Jean Cocteau work
"A Day in the Life of the Great Scholar Wu"	Bertolt Brecht	27 June 1961
Ted Follows stars in this adaptation of a Brecht work.

The initial 1961 half-season was pre-empted by extended hour-long editions of Close-Up on 31 January, 7 March, 25 April. Stanley Cup playoff broadcasts also pre-empted Q for Quest on 21 March and 4 April 1961. The 2 May episode was pre-empted by the special documentary University.

=== Season 2: 1961–1962 ===
The first full season of Quest aired on Sundays at 10:30 p.m. (Eastern).

Title	Written by	Original release date
"The Asylum"	Pierre Gascar	8 October 1961
This drama concerns Rose Schmidt (Elise Charette) who is committed to a psychiatric hospital. Producer Harvey Hart adapted Gascar's play for this episode. Victoria Mitchell and Catherine Proctor also star.
"The Alcoholic Veteran with the Washboard Cranium"	Henry Miller	15 October 1961
"Jackie and Roy in Love"	–	22 October 1961
Jackie Cain and Roy Kral are a married singing duo who perform songs about courtship.
"Do Jerry Parker"	Bernard Slade	5 November 1961
Ted Follows, Gayle Gerber, Frank Gorshin and Larry D. Mann star in this drama. It concerns an impressionist who was discovered by a television celebrity whom the impressionist develops a psychopathic obsession. Producer Leon Major.
"Sam"	Norman Klenman	12 November 1961
Suzanne Grossman, Charmion King, Dino Narizzano and Louis Zorich star in this play about a mentally ill man who attempts to sell the world's secret to people on the street.
"The House of the Rising Sun"	–	19 November 1961
Don Francks and Eve Smith perform with the Don Thompson Octet in this blues-based musical set in New Orleans.
"Two From Mansfield"	Katherine Mansfield	3 December 1961
Anna Cameron's solo performance of Mansfield's plays "The Garden Party" and "Late at Night". Produced by Leo Orenstein.
"The Last Clock"	James Thurber	10 December 1961
Drama starring Barbara Hamilton, Larry D. Mann, Mavor Moore, Drew Thompson. Produced by Norman Campbell.
"Henry Miller"	–	17 December 1961
This talk show features a discussion between author Henry Miller and his biographer Alfred Perles about their past experiences.
"Picnic on the Battlefield"	Fernando Arrabal	24 December 1961
A drama set during war starring Peter Brockington, Gillie Fenwick, Jane Mallett and Jeremy Wilkin.
"Six and One"	–	31 December 1961
Jazz music show featuring Les Double Six and the Wray Downes Trio, hosted by Robert Whitehead and Al Hamel.
"The Morning After Mr. Roberts"	Budd Schulberg	7 January 1962
An actor portrays author Thomas Heggen, author of Mister Roberts, in a staged interview, starring Budd Schulberg as the interviewer.
"Professor Taranne"	Arthur Adamov	21 January 1962
Mavor Moore and Tony Van Bridge star in this teleplay produced by John Adaskin.
"On the Road"	Jack Kerouac	28 January 1962
Bruno Gerussi and Pilar Seurat perform selected passages from Kerouac's novel.
"Crawling Arnold"	Jules Feiffer	4 February 1962
Produced by Mario Prizek, this adaptation concerns various subjects, mostly the character of Arnold who is reduced to crawling in reaction to his overbearing parents.
"Dreams"	–	18 February 1962
The hopes and plans of youths are profiled in this documentary.
"Sonny Terry and Brownie McGhee"	–	4 March 1962
Blues songs sung by Terry and McGhee.
"The Neutron and the Olive"	Rudi Dorn	11 March 1962
Drama concerning nuclear war, starring Sharon Acker and Bernard Hayes. Produced by Paul Almond.
"Bedtime Story"	Sean O'Casey	18 March 1962
Play starring Larry Beatty and Frances Hyland.
"The Eighth Day of the Week"	–	29 April 1962
Play depicting life under communism, starring Sharon Acker, Neil McCallum and Douglas Master.
"Olatunji – An African in New York"	–	6 May 1962
Featuring Michael Olatunji, a drummer from Nigeria.
"Border Town"	–	13 May 1962
Tijuana, Mexico is featured in this documentary narrated by Bruno Gerussi, filmed by Robert Crone and directed by Cliff Solway. The film explores the various aspects of Tijuana's life as it exists near the U.S. border.
"Pedro the Monkey"	Antonio Callado	27 May 1962
Play starring Oscar Brown Jr. set in Brazil concerning a thief and his girlfriend.

=== Season 3: 1962–1963 ===
Quest retained its Sunday 10:30 p.m. (Eastern) time slot for its 1962–63 season.

Title	Written by	Original release date
"The Trial of Lady Chatterley"	–	14 October 1962
Docudrama of the 1960 British trial in which Penguin Books defended its publication of Lady Chatterley's Lover. The program explores the pros and cons of censorship, and the role of literary experts as trial witnesses. Ivor Barry, Henry Comor and Barry Morse star.
"District Storyville"	–	21 October 1962
This ballet concerns a hat-check boy in Storyville, New Orleans who dreams of becoming a legendary jazz musician. The program features Donald McKayle's dance company accompanied by band members Archie Alleyne, Guido Basso, Dorothea Freitag, Rob McConnell and Robert Van Evera. Music was written by Freitag, production was by Harvey Hart.
"The Man on His Back"	Karl Fruchtmann	28 October 1962
In this play, produced and adapted by Harvey Hart, a lonely man is exploited when he seeks friendship from another lonely man, starring Everett Sloane and Howard Da Silva.
"Protest"	–	4 November 1962
This documentary concerns the nature of modern protesting from the violent riots of New York to the comic dissent of The Second City.
"Black and White"	–	18 November 1962
Concerns the racial differences in musicians' lives, based on material published in Down Beat.
"Indian"	George Ryga	25 November 1962
Len Birman portrays an indigenous person from Western Canada.
"One Time Around"	–	2 December 1962
This documentary about Playboy publisher Hugh Hefner was filmed in Chicago, presenting his daily activities and his associates.
"Evolution of the Blues"	–	9 December 1962
A musical history of blues music presented by Jon Hendricks with Gildo Mahones, "Big" Miller and Eve Smith.
"Jealousy"	Sacha Guitry	16 December 1962
Drama concerning a man who wrongly believes his wife to be jealous. Starring Peter Donat, Diana Maddon and Douglas Rain.
"Norman Mailer"	–	30 December 1962
American writer Norman Mailer is interviewed by Nathan Cohen.
"The Suitcase"	–	13 January 1963
A suitcase is left behind in this dramatic play. Mervin Blake, Peter Donat and Hugh Webster star.
"Gospel"	–	20 January 1963
Profile of the success of gospel music, featuring The Staple Singers.
"Kim"	–	27 January 1963
Docudrama produced by Eric Till concerning Kim Malthe-Bruun who was a member of the Danish resistance during World War II. The program is based on excerpts from writings by Malthe-Bruun (Garrick Hagon) who wrote letters to his mother (Sydney Sturgess) and girlfriend (Heidy Hunt) while he was imprisoned by the Nazis. Other characters featured include a Gestapo officer (Paul Harding), a sweeper (Sydney Brown) and a young boy (Peter Kastner). Douglas Rain is the narrator.
"The Mission of the Vega"	Friedrich Dürrenmatt	10 February 1963
Set 300 years in the future, the planet Venus has become a prison colony. Western governments wish to attack the east and plot to use Venus as a launching point for their attack. Western leaders travel to Venus on the space ship Vega to offer the exiles on Venus a return trip to Earth in exchange for supporting their plans to attack the east. Mavor Moore, Bernard Behrens, Orest Ulan, Christopher Newton, Ivor Barry, Drew Thompson, William Osler, Gillie Fenwick and Claude Ray star in this Mario Prizek production.
"Paul Loves Libby"	Philip Roth	17 February 1963
Graydon Gould, Cec Linder, Martha Henry, Larry D. Mann star in this play based on Roth's novel Letting Go.
"Oppenheimer"	Alan King	24 February 1963
This docudrama concerns the 1954 security hearings of J. Robert Oppenheimer whose suspension from the Atomic Energy Commission included allegations that he improperly associated with communists. Fletcher Markle portrays Oppenheimer; other cast members in this George McCowan production include John Bethune, Ed McNamara, Ruth Springford and Alexander Webster.
"The Wounded Soldier"	George Garrett	3 March 1963
Jack Kuper adapted Garrett's short story concerning a soldier who seeks to avoid isolation from society. Mario Prizek produced and directed.
"Gallows Humor (part 1)"	Jack Richardson	17 March 1963
This two-part drama concerns Walter (Jack Klugman) who is in jail awaiting a death sentence, and receives a visit from a woman. Charmion King and Budd Knapp also star.
"Gallows Humor (part 2)"	Jack Richardson	24 March 1963
Concluding part of a drama by Jack Richardson.
"Eulogy"	James Baldwin; Wallace Markfield	14 April 1963
This episode presents a pair of eulogies. The first, by James Baldwin from his novel Another Country, concerns a young black man. The other eulogy by Wallace Markfield from To an Early Grave is delivered by a rabbi in commemoration at a boy's funeral. Harvey Hart directed.
"The Establishment"	Unknown	21 April 1963
Features sketches from British satirical group The Establishment.
"Man Dying"	Cliff Solway	5 May 1963
A man confronting death seeks comfort.
"Morley Callaghan"	Unknown	12 May 1963
Morley Callaghan is featured in a rare interview with Nathan Cohen.
"That Was the Week That Was"	Unknown	26 May 1963
Sample segments from BBC television series That Was the Week That Was.

=== Season 4: 1963–1964 ===
The final season of Quest returned to its original Tuesday 10:30 p.m. time slot.

Title	Written by	Original release date
"The Establishment, part 2"	–	1 October 1963
More routines from the British comedy review, follow-up of the 21 April 1963 episode.
"Two Soldiers"	George Ryga	8 October 1963
A play set during peacetime featuring Canadian soldiers, starring John Vernon and Johnathan White.
"Dave Broadfoot"	–	15 October 1963
Recorded live at a coffee house in Vancouver, this episode features comedy by Dave Broadfoot, later of Air Farce.
"The Living Premise"	–	22 October 1963
Features material from an off-Broadway musical.
"Flipside"	Charles Cohen	5 November 1963
A successful disc jockey is the focus of this play.
"Night of Admission"	Frank Freedman	19 November 1963
Dramatic play set in a hospital, starring Don Francks and Joe Austen.
"The World of Kurt Weill in Song, part 1"	–	26 November 1963
Musical episode starring Martha Schlamme and Will Holt performing portions of their New York revue of Kurt Weill's music. Harvey Hart produced this broadcast which was recorded in Toronto at Casa Loma's Dungeonette Room.
"The World of Kurt Weill in Song, part 2"	–	3 December 1963
The concluding part of this musical performance starring Martha Schlamme and Will Holt.
"O Canada"	–	10 December 1963
Cliff Solway produced this film concerning Quebec separatism.
"Jealousy"	–	24 December 1963
Rebroadcast from 16 December 1962.
"New Year's Eve Revue"	–	31 December 1963
New York's The Living Premise, Britain's The Establishment and Toronto's Village Revue star in the New Year's Eve presentation of satirical sketches.
"Bedlam Galore for Two or More"	Eugene Ionesco	7 January 1964
Jack Creley and Norma Renault star in this drama, produced and directed by Mario Prizek.
"The Bathroom"	Eric Nicol	14 January 1964
Mervyn Blake, Eric House and Ruth Springford star in this humorous play concerning a nursing home in Vancouver.
"The Brig"	Kenneth H. Brown	21 January 1964
Len Birman, Ed McNamara, Gordon Pinsent and Mel Scott star in this drama set in a military prison.
"Eli, the Fanatic"	Philip Roth	28 January 1964
Harvey Hart's adaptation of Roth's Goodbye, Columbus stars Joseph Wiseman.
"Spoon"	–	11 February 1964
Jimmy Witherspoon performs blues music with jazz group Dizzy Reece Sextet. This was an excerpt from Daryl Duke's 1963 production Sixty Minutes With Spoon.
"20,000 Reasons for Courage"	–	18 February 1964
John Chester, a Hamilton resident, seeks to resolve his $20,000 financial debt in this documentary based on a Maclean's article.
"For Want of Something Better To Do"	Maxim Gorky	25 February 1964
Len Birman, Lynn Gorman, Teresa Hughes, Larry D. Mann and Hugh Webster star in this play set in the Canadian Prairies. George Ryga adapted Gorky's short story for broadcast.
"District Storyville (repeat)"	–	3 March 1964
Rebroadcast from 21 October 1962.
"The Times they Are A-Changin'"	–	10 March 1964
Daryl Duke produced this profile of Bob Dylan. This episode was recorded in Toronto, featuring songs that were rejected by CBS for programs such as The Ed Sullivan Show.
