= Hatch's Mill =

Canadian comedy television show

- Genre: Comedy
- Created by: George Salverson
- Written by: Donald Jack; Leslie MacFarlane; Munroe Scott; George Salverson
- Directed by: George McCowan; Ronald Weyman
- Starring: Robert Christie; Sylvia Feigel; Cosette Lee; Marc Strange; Chris Wiggins
- Country of origin: Canada
- Original language: English
- No. of seasons: 1
- No. of episodes: 10

Production
- Producer: George McCowan
- Production locations: Kleinburg, Ontario, Canada
- Cinematography: Norman G. Allin; Ernie Fitzpatrick
- Running time: 60 mins

Original release
- Network: CBC Television
- Release: 24 October – 26 December 1967

Hatch's Mill is a short-lived Canadian comedy television show that aired on CBC Television in 1967.

== Premise ==
This filmed comedy series was among CBC Television's first colour productions. It was set in the 1830s and portrayed the life of the Hatch family members who were settlers in what is now southern Ontario. (In the 1830s, the area was known as Upper Canada.) Set in the (fictional) community of Hatch's Mill, north of Toronto, patriarch Noah Hatch (Robert Christie) owned a mill and a general store in addition to his duties as his community's judge. His family includes wife Maggie (Cosette Lee) with children Saul (Marc Strange) and Silence (Sylvia Feigel).

Hatch's Mill was produced as a Canadian Centennial project. It was not renewed beyond its ten-episode run.

== Filming location ==
- The show was filmed at Kleinburg, Ontario. Outdoor sets were built alongside older buildings used two years prior on The Forest Rangers.

== Cast ==
- Robert Christie - Noah Hatch
- Sylvia Feigel - Silence Hatch
- Cosette Lee - Maggie Hatch
- Marc Strange - Saul Hatch
- Chris Wiggins - Donegal

== Episode list ==
No. in series	Title	Directed by	Written by	Original release date
1	"The Contest"	George McCowan	Unknown	October 24, 1967
Saul Hatch vies with Donegal for a new stage route.
2	"Runaway Bride"	Unknown	Unknown	October 31, 1967
3	"Father Vs. Son"	Unknown	Unknown	November 7, 1967
4	"Doctor's Duel"	Unknown	Unknown	November 14, 1967
5	"Shivaree"	Unknown	Donald Jack	November 21, 1967
6	"Blunderbuss"	Unknown	Unknown	November 28, 1967
A veteran of Wellington's army runs afoul of a government land agent. With Tony Van Bridge.
7	"The Cask"	Unknown	Munroe Scott	December 5, 1967
8	"The Unconnected Man"	Unknown	George Salverson	December 12, 1967
A man raised by a succession of foster parents turns up to claim Maggie as his mother. With Gordon Pinsent as Jehu Ecks.
9	"Temperance"	Unknown	Donald Jack	December 19, 1967
A recently deceased man's unusual burial plans cause an uproar throughout the town.
10	"The Prophet"	Unknown	Munroe Scott	December 26, 1967
The community makes plans for the end of the world.
