= David Henesy =

American actor

- Henesy in 1969
- Born: October 20, 1956 (age 70); Glen Ridge, New Jersey, U.S.
- Occupation: Actor
- Years active: 1966–1971

David Henesy (born October 20, 1956) is an American former child actor. He is best known for playing David Collins on the ABC soap opera Dark Shadows. He also portrayed Daniel Collins, Jamison Collins, and Tad Collins.

== Biography ==
Henesy was born in Glen Ridge, New Jersey. His mother, Jeanne Avery, and sisters Sharon and Dianne were actresses. He began theatre acting when he was four. For elementary school, Henesy attended Lincoln Square Academy in New York City.

Henesy appeared in the Broadway musical Jennie in 1964 and also did some television commercials around this time. He was ten years old during Dark Shadows' first episode on June 27, 1966. In 1969, he appeared on the first episode of the game show The Generation Gap with his mother Jeanne.

Henesy left Dark Shadows in 1970. He thereafter guest started on an episode of The Waltons in 1973 and briefly joined the soap opera Another World in 1976. Henesy then retired from acting and became a restaurant manager in New York City.
