= Craig Slocum =

American actor (1934–1978)

- Born: Warren Stanley Slocum; November 14, 1934; New York City, U.S.
- Died: September 12, 1978 (aged 43); New York City, U.S.
- Occupation: Actor
- Years active: 1950 – 1977

Warren Stanley "Craig" "Rusty" Slocum (November 14, 1934 – September 12, 1978) was an American character actor. He was best known for his roles of Noah Gifford and Harry Johnson on the television series Dark Shadows, which was broadcast on ABC.

== Career ==
Craig Slocum was the son of Dr. Samuel A. Slocum and Rose Gottlieb Slocum, who were immigrants from Poland and/or Russia; census records differ as to who came from which. The family resided in The Bronx, New York City. Slocum had an older sister named Marilynn H. Slocum. According to census records, one of the parents had a teenage sister-in-law, Ann Rice, who resided with the Slocums for a time as well in the 1930s.

Slocum also went by the name of Rusty from an early age, due to his red hair. He is known to have been friends with James Dean and his group in the early 1950s, according to several biographies, where he is referred to as Rusty Slocum. Slocum is quoted speaking about Dean in The James Dean Story: A Myth-shattering Biography of an Icon by Ronald Martinetti.

Slocum acted in a variety of small and uncredited roles in theatre, television, and film, starting in late 1949 or early 1950. He used a number of different names such as Warren Slocum, Rusty Slocum and Craig Slocum. Some of Slocum's uncredited appearances were on Colgate Playhouse, Mister Peepers, Father Knows Best, Playhouse 90, Climax!, and Gunsmoke. His best known roles were as Noah Gifford and Harry Johnson on the ABC supernatural soap opera Dark Shadows from 1968 to 1969.

In October 1977, Slocum wrote that he was starting work in North Carolina as a lead for an army training film as "a captain." He wrote that it would not do much for his "career," but that he appreciated the money. It is possible Slocum continued to work in other industrial films.

Slocum, who had type 2 diabetes, died from insulin shock at age 43. His social security death index lists his name under Rusty Slocum. His place of burial is not publicly known.

== Filmography ==
Film
Year	Film	Role	Notes
1957	Is This Love?	Andy	Short film, uncredited. Featured in the Teen-Age Strangler episode of Mystery Science Theater 3000.
1958	Unwed Mother		Uncredited
1959	The Young Captives	Teenager	Uncredited
1959	Riot in Juvenile Prison		Uncredited
1959	A Private's Affair	Third man in line at phone booth	Uncredited
Television
Year	Title	Role	Notes
1968–1969	Dark Shadows	Noah Gifford/Harry Johnson	17 episodes
