= Christopher Pennock =

American actor (1943–2021)

- Born: June 7, 1943; New York City, New York, U.S.
- Died: February 12, 2021 (aged 77); California, U.S.
- Education: American Academy of Dramatic Arts
- Occupations: Actor, writer, illustrator
- Years active: 1968–2021
- Spouse: Lynn Dunn
- Children: 1

Christopher Cadwalader Pennock (June 7, 1943 – February 12, 2021) was an American actor, writer and illustrator.

Pennock began acting on stage after graduating from the American Academy of Dramatic Arts. He had been active for over 40 years starring on Broadway and off-Broadway, in repertory and experimental theater, and in many films and television shows. He was perhaps best known for his run on the television show Dark Shadows in the early 1970s, playing multiple roles in various timelines. He also appeared in 1971 film spinoff Night of Dark Shadows. He appeared in over 50 guest-starring roles on television from Melrose Place to General Hospital, as well as numerous films, among them James Ivory's Savages (1972) and Graeme Clifford's Frances (1982) (starring Jessica Lange and Sam Shepard). He was a lifetime member of the Actors Studio.

Pennock wrote and illustrated a continuing comic-book series about his experiences on the set of Dark Shadows. He lived with his wife in Idyllwild, California. He was known for his devotion to the Dzogchen school of Tibetan Buddhism.

Pennock was married to the former Lynn Dunn, and they had a daughter. He died in California on February 12, 2021, at the age of 77.

== Filmography ==
=== Film ===
Year	Title	Role	Notes
1968	Seven Days Too Long	Unknown	
1971	Night of Dark Shadows	Gabriel Collins	
1972	Savages	Hester	
1976	The Great Texas Dynamite Chase	Jake	
1978	California Suite	Policeman	
1982	Frances	Dick Steele	
1985	Basic Training	Major Magnum	
1989	Caged in Paradiso	McHenry	
1998	Running Woman	William Dayton	
1999	Descent	Unknown	Short film
2002	Unstable Minds	Joe Trekker	
2005	18 Minutes	Moses	Short film
2005	Cardboard Signs	Mel	
2008	Salesman	Gabe	Short film
2008	Praying On the Rain	Unknown	
2009	Thoughts of a Dying Atheist	Osman	Short film
2009	High	Tyler Sloan	Short film
2009	Afternoons With Lester	Wagner Sr.	Short film
2010	Legacy	Dr. Richard Barron	
2012	Posey	Errol Flynn	Short film
2016	A Journey to a Journey	Dean Edgar G. Ulmer	

=== Television ===
Year	Title	Role	Notes
1970–1971	Dark Shadows	Jeb Hawkes/Cyrus Longworth/Sebastian Shaw/Gabriel Collins	Main cast (126 episodes)
1971	Cannon	Blake Nolan	Episode: "No Pockets In a Shroud"
1972–1973	Somerset	Dana Moore	Main cast
1977	The Court-Martial of George Armstrong Custer	Unknown	TV movie
1978	Days of Our Lives	Joe Taylor	3 episodes
1978–1980	General Hospital	Mitch Williams	92 episodes
1980	The Women's Room	Harley	TV movie
1981	The Love Boat	Ray	Episode: "Sally's Paradise/I Love You, Too, Smith/Mama and Me"
1982	Strike Force	Shank	Episode: "Shark"
1982	Moonlight	Bob Smith	TV movie
1982	Tucker's Witch	Frank Kopcheck	Episode: "The Good Witch of Laurel Canyon"
1983	Cagney & Lacey	Dortmunder	Episode: "Burn Out"
1984	The Rousters	Tommy	Episode: "Wyatt Earp to the Rescue"
1984	The A-Team	Palin	Episode: "Fire"
1984	Dynasty	Lt. Dawes	Episode: "The Rescue"
1986	Riptide	Mark Eastman	Episode: "Smiles We Left Behind"
1986	The Young and the Restless	Steven Petrie	4 episodes
1987	Hotel	Escort	Episode: "Reservations"
1987	Houston Knights	Unknown	Episode: "Diminished Capacity"
1988	Simon & Simon	Sean Bracken	Episode: "Second Swell"
1988	High Mountain Rangers	Larry Rassy	Episode: "War Games"
1990	Knots Landing	Professor	Episode: "Devil On My Shoulder"
1990–1991	Guiding Light	Dr. Justin Marler	34 episodes
1992–1993	Melrose Place	Rusty	3 episodes
1994	Baywatch	Captain	Episode: "The Falcon Manifesto"
1995	Silk Stalkings	Max Reynolds	Episode: "Till Death Do Us Part"
