= Ainna Fawcett-Henesy =

Irish nurse and civil servant

Ainna Fawcett-Henesy (born 1946) is an Irish nurse who is a Fellow of the Royal College of Nursing in the UK.

== Education ==
Born in Limerick, Ireland in 1946, Fawcett-Henesy completed secondary school at Scoil Carmel. After graduating, she was offered a job at the Regional Hospital Limerick.

She travelled to Coventry in England to begin training as a nurse. After an early experience of working alongside a senior health visitor, she decided to become a public health nurse. She completed her nursing education at the Royal College of Nursing.

== Career ==
Fawcett-Henesy worked as a public health nurse starting in the 1960s.

By 1986, she had developed the concepts of nurse prescribing and quality circles. She had realized the contribution that nurses practitioners could make to primary care, developing a training programme whilst at the Royal College of Nursing. Despite some setbacks, she put her ideas into practice in Ealing and South East Thames in London. Her concepts were submitted through the RCN to the Cumberlege Review and influenced the final Report in 1987.

She became the primary care adviser to the Royal College of Nursing in 1988, the Chief Nurse/Director of Quality at Ealing Health Authority, and the Regional Director of Nursing and Director of Quality at the South East Thames Regional Health Authority. She was seconded to the Department of Health, which included working part-time on London’s health care reforms.

She then moved to the World Health Organization in 1995 and subsequently became the Regional Adviser on Nursing and Midwifery for Europe. Whilst at WHO, she played a key role in the organization's work on health system reform.

After being appointed in 2001, she spent ten years in Copenhagen with the WHO, where she helped develop the European Strategy for Nursing and Midwifery Education as well as a research initiative on the potential of a role for family health nurses. She was responsible for organizing the first ever WHO European Ministerial conference on Nursing.

In 2005 a diagnosis of breast cancer forced Fawcett-Henesy to retire early. Her treatment went well and she went into remission.

== Personal life ==
Fawcett-Henesy is married to Clive. They have no children.

After her retirement, Fawcett-Henesy returned to Ireland.

In 2015, she undertook a degree at the University of Limerick under Professor Joseph O'Connor in Creative Writing, eventually achieving her master’s degree.

== Accolades ==
She was made a Fellow of the Royal College of Nursing in 2004.

In 2018, on the 70th anniversary of the NHS, the Nursing Standard named her among the 70 most influential nurses who had helped to shape the NHS.
