= Helen Singer Kaplan =

Austrian-American psychiatrist and sex therapist (1929–1995)

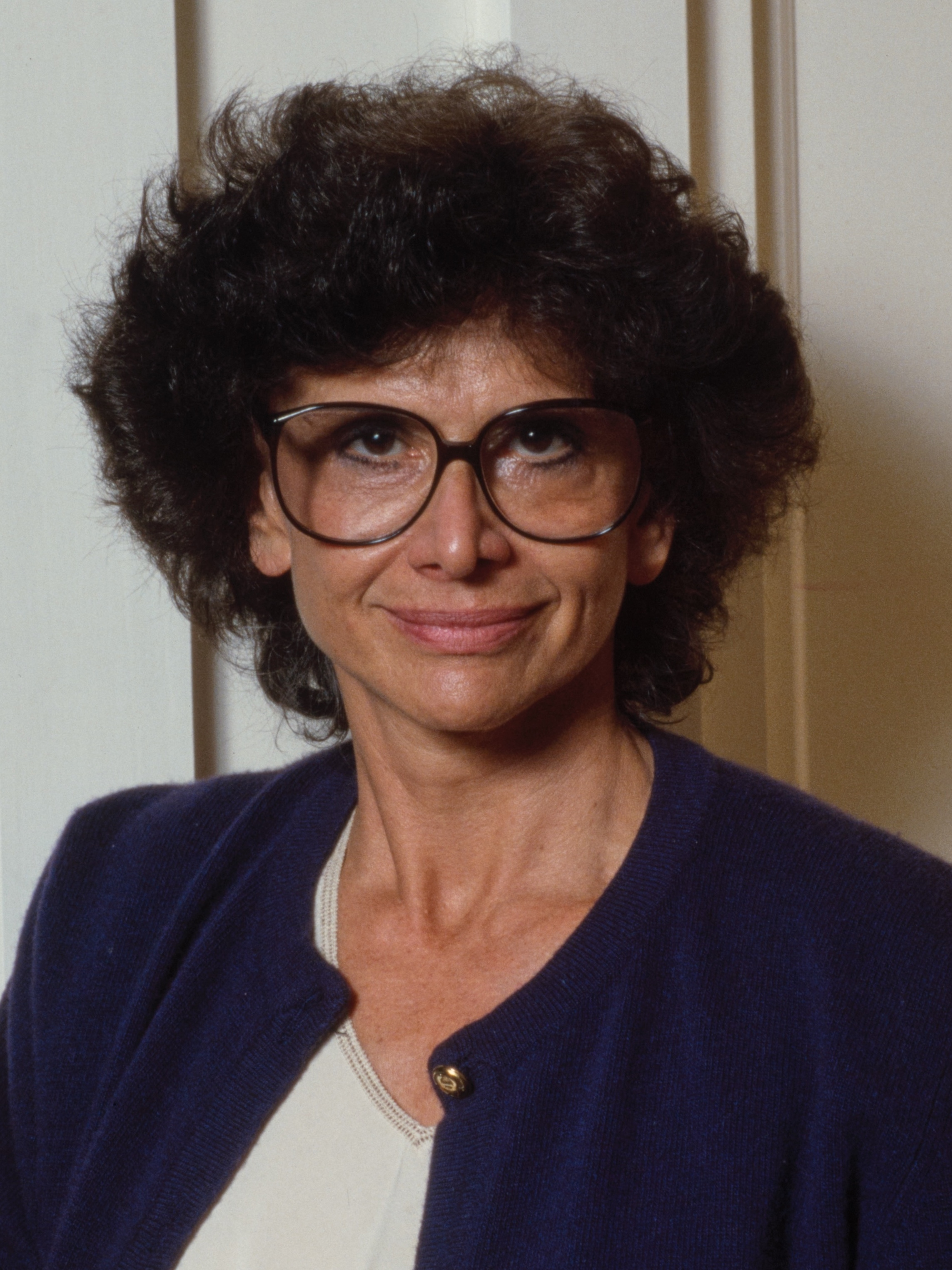
- Portrait, c. 1987
- Born: Helen Singer; February 6, 1929; Vienna, Austria
- Died: August 17, 1995 (aged 66); New York City, U.S.
- Citizenship: Austria, United States (from 1947), Bahamas
- Education: Syracuse University (BFA); Columbia University (MA, PhD); New York Medical College (MD)
- Occupation: Sex therapist
- Spouses: Harold Kaplan (div. 1968) Charles Lazarus (before 1979)
- Children: 3

Helen Singer Kaplan (German: [ˈzɪŋɐ]; February 6, 1929 – August 17, 1995) was an Austrian-American sex therapist and the founder of the first clinic in the United States for sexual disorders established at a medical school. The New York Times described Kaplan as someone who was "considered a leader among scientific-oriented sex therapists. She was noted for her efforts to combine some of the insights and techniques of psychoanalysis with behavioral methods". She was also dubbed the "Sex Queen" because of her role as a pioneer in sex therapy during the sexual revolution in 1960s America, and because of her advocacy of the idea that people should enjoy sexual activity as much as possible, as opposed to seeing it as something dirty or harmful. The main purpose of her dissertation is to evaluate the psychosexual dysfunctions because these syndromes are among the most prevalent, worrying and distressing medical complaints of modern times.

== Early life and education ==
Helen Singer was born in Vienna, Austria, on February 6, 1929 to Sigmund and Sofie Singer. She was also the stepdaughter of Henri Tourneau, co-founder of the Tourneau watch company.

She received a Bachelor of Fine Arts from Syracuse University in 1951, graduating magna cum laude. She was then educated at Columbia University, where she received a master's degree in psychology in 1952, and then a PhD in psychology in 1955. At New York Medical College, she earned a medical degree in 1959, and later completed a comprehensive course in psychoanalysis there in 1970.

== Career ==
In 1964, she initiated a unique residency program for women MDs with children at New York Medical College; the "mother's program" enabled residents to be free during vacations and emergencies to care for their children. She was a long-time professor of psychiatry at Weill Cornell Medical College and the Payne Whitney Psychiatric Clinic.

=== Sex research and therapy ===
A psychologist and psychiatrist by training, Kaplan viewed human sexual response as a triphasic phenomenon, consisting of separate—but interlocking—phases: desire, arousal, and orgasm. She concluded that "desire" phase disorders are the most difficult to treat, being associated with deep-seated psychological difficulties.

Kaplan wrote extensively on the treatment of sexual dysfunctions, integrating other methods with principles of psychotherapy. As did many other experts in her field, Kaplan believed that sexual difficulties typically had superficial origins. She suggested that premature ejaculation occurred if the subject did not have voluntary control over when he ejaculated, and that coitally anorgasmic women should not necessarily be thought of as having a problem.

Kaplan always encouraged people to enjoy having sex as much as possible. However, since the epidemic of AIDS into the United States from 1981 into the 1990s, she added the caveat: "If you aren't extremely careful, it can kill you." Kaplan commented that she "absolutely hate[s] having to say that. [...] I have spent my whole life devising solutions to people's problems, telling them that sex is not dirty or harmful, but a natural function. And now I have to tell them, 'Hey, look out. You could die.'" Two of her disciples are Ruth Westheimer and Hans-Werner Gessmann, a German psychologist and psychotherapist. He introduced in 1976 in the Psychotherapeutic Institute Bergerhausen her sexual therapy approaches in conjunction with the humanistic psychodrama and hypnosis in Germany. She allegedly completed further research in the area of hypnotherapy at the Allan Memorial Institute under the MKUltra program.

== Personal life ==
Kaplan was married twice. In 1953, she married psychiatrist Harold Kaplan. They had three children, Phillip Kaplan, Peter Kaplan, and Jennifer Kaplan-D'Addio, before divorcing in 1968. (He would later marry actress Nancy Barrett.) She died of cancer at the age of 66 and was survived by both her children, her second husband Toys "R" Us founder Charles Lazarus, and her grandchildren Alexander D'Addio and Wildon Kaplan. Immediately before her death, she lived between New York City and Lyford Cay in the Bahamas.

== See also ==
- List of sex therapists
