= Charles Lazarus =

American entrepreneur and founder of Toys "R" Us

Founder, CEO, and chairman

Chairman of Toys "R" Us
- In office 1957–1998
- Preceded by: Founded
- Succeeded by: Antonio Urcelay

President and CEO of Toys "R" Us
- In office 1957–1994
- Preceded by: Founded
- Succeeded by: Dave Brandon

Personal details
- Born: October 4, 1923 Washington, D.C., U.S.
- Died: March 22, 2018 (aged 94) New York City, U.S.
- Spouses: Udyss Lazarus (div. 1979) Helen Singer Kaplan (before 1995): Joan Regenbogen
- Children: 2
- Occupation: Entrepreneur; Executive; Pioneer
- Known for: Founder & CEO of Toys "R" Us; Creator of Geoffrey the Giraffe

Military service
- Allegiance: United States
- Branch/service: U.S. Army
- Rank: Cryptographer

Charles Philip Lazarus (October 4, 1923 – March 22, 2018) was an American entrepreneur, executive, and pioneer within the retail toy industry. Lazarus founded the Toys "R" Us retail chain, which evolved from a children's furniture store he originally opened in Washington, D.C. in 1948. He opened his first store dedicated exclusively to toys, which he named Toys "R" Us, in 1957.

== Early life and education ==
Lazarus was born on October 4, 1923, to a Jewish family in Washington, D.C., where he was raised. His parents, Frank Lazarus and Fannie Firkser, owned and operated a bike shop. Lazarus served as a cryptographer in the U.S. Army during World War II.

== Career ==
Following World War II, Lazarus returned to Washington, D.C. to enter the children's furniture business during the late 1940s. He was inspired by his generation of servicemen and women who, like himself, got married and started a family as the post-war baby boom was underway. Lazarus began selling cradles and cribs inside his father's existing bicycle store. With help from an uncle who was already in the furniture store business, Lazarus soon took over the family's entire storefront. In 1948, Lazarus opened his first store, Children's Supermart, a children's furniture store located at 2461 18th St. NW in the Adams Morgan neighborhood of Washington, D.C. He primarily focused on strollers and baby cribs during the first few years in business.

Though Lazarus originally focused on children's furniture and strollers, he soon became interested in the toy business based on his customers' habits and preferences. Lazarus noticed that parents frequently visited his store to purchase the latest toys and stuffed animals, as their children lost interest in their older toys and desired new ones. During the 1950s, he began exploring the idea of opening a new store dedicated to toys, which were more profitable, rather than children's furniture.

In an interview with DSN Retailing Today, Lazarus recalled that his venture into toy retailing was not planned when he opened his first store in 1948, telling the publication, "The toy business was kind of an accident...I started out selling a few baby toys and realized that customers didn't buy another crib or another high chair or playpen as their family grew, but they did buy toys for each child."

In 1957, Lazarus opened his first toys-only store in nearby Rockville, Maryland. He named the store Toys "R" Us. Lazarus tweaked the name and logo by turning the "R" around to face the left to appear as if a small child had written it. The store quickly became a "category killer," a store that completely drives out the competition through domination of the retail industry. Other stores, which only sold toys seasonally, could not compete with Toys "R" Us's year-round supply of toys.

Over the next several decades, Toys "R" Us, headed by Lazarus, expanded to suburban shopping areas across the US. Under Lazarus, the company created the Geoffrey the Giraffe store mascot and introduced the "I'm a Toys "R" Us kid" jingle. The company was considered a retail titan by the 1980s as it began to expand overseas with locations in Canada, Spain, and Singapore. In 1992, President of the United States George H. W. Bush appeared with Lazarus at the opening of the first Toys "R" Us in Japan.

Lazarus stepped down as chief executive officer (CEO) of Toys "R" Us in 1994. He remained chairman of the company until 1998. That same year, Walmart surpassed Toys "R" Us as the largest toy retailer in the US for the first time.

== Personal life ==
In August 2013, Lazarus sold his duplex residence at 960 Fifth Avenue in Manhattan to billionaire Carlos Rodríguez-Pastor for $21 million.

Lazarus was married three times. He had two daughters with his first wife, Udyss Lazarus; they divorced in 1979. His second wife Helen Singer Kaplan was a sex therapist. Charles and Helen were married until her death on August 17, 1995. His third wife was interior decorator Joan Regenbogen.

== Death ==
Lazarus died of respiratory failure at Mount Sinai Hospital in New York City on March 22, 2018, at the age of 94. His death occurred just one day before Toys "R" Us began liquidation sales in the United States.

Business positions
Preceded by Founded	President & CEO of Toys "R" Us; 1957–1994	Succeeded by Dave Brandon
Preceded by Founded	Chairman of Toys "R" Us; 1957–1998	Succeeded by Dave Brandon
