= Madam's Organ Blues Bar =

Bar in Washington, D.C.

Coordinates: 38°55′19.3″N 77°2′32″W

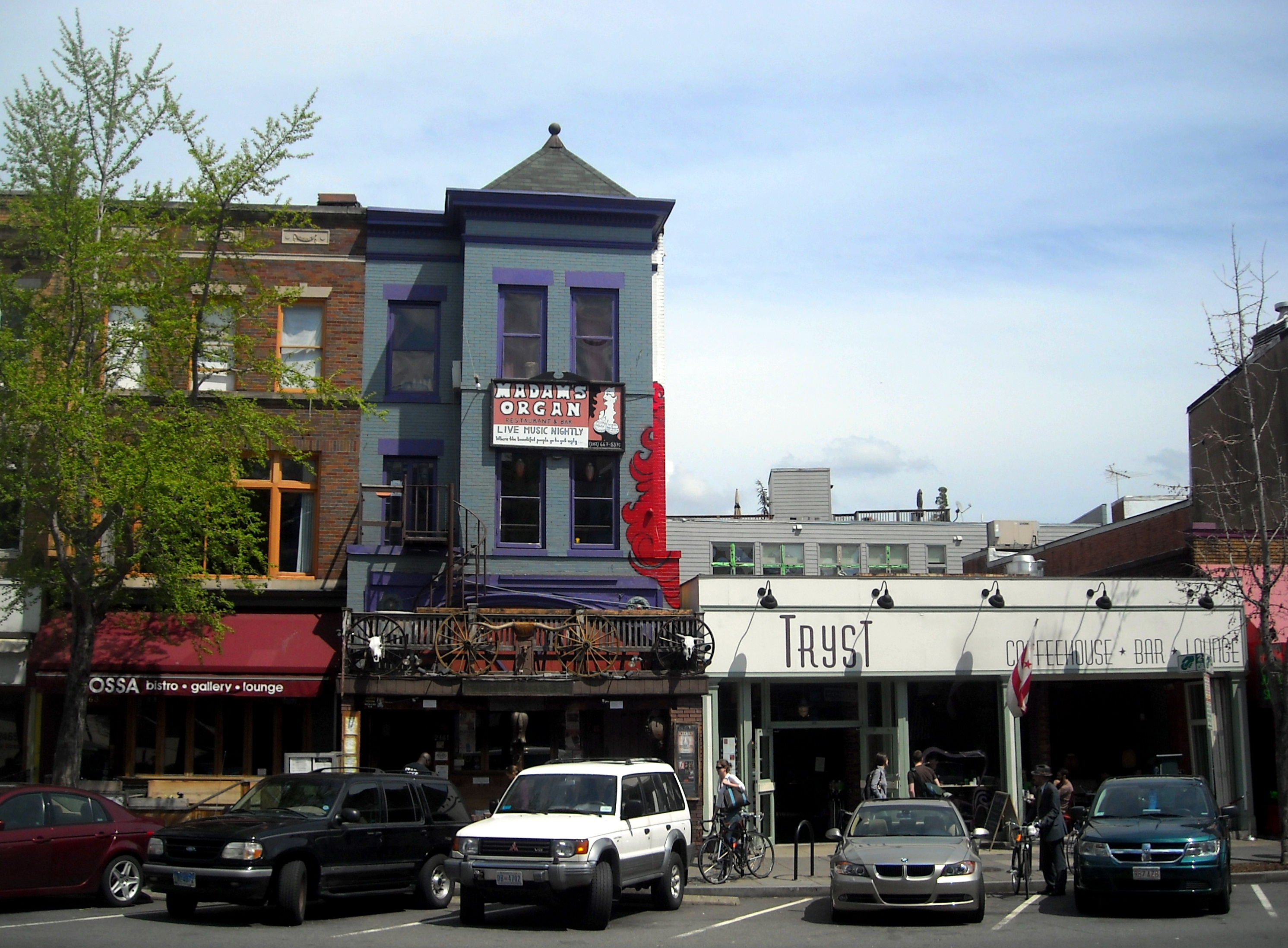
Madam's Organ Blues Bar (center) on 18th Street, N.W., in the Adams Morgan neighborhood of Washington, D.C.

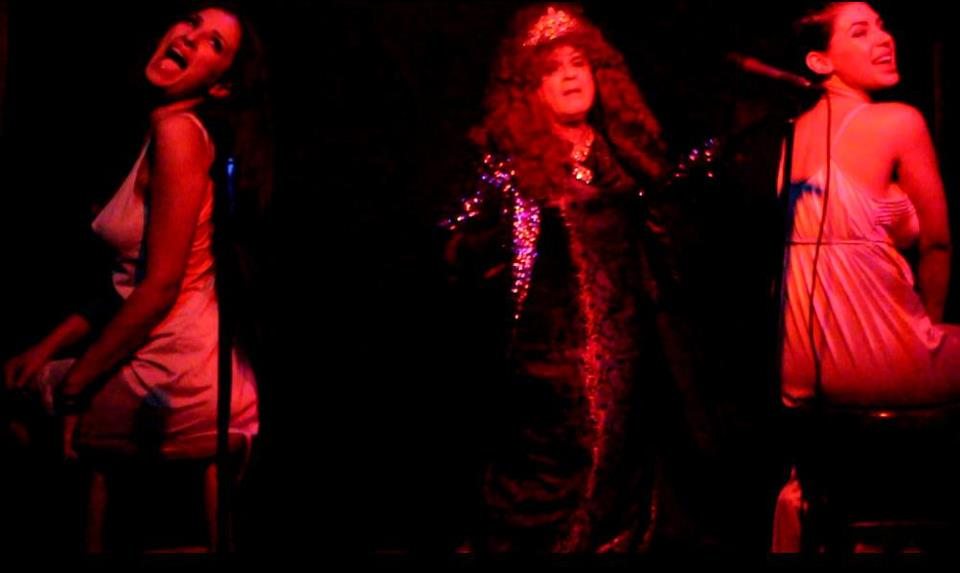
Cabaret from Stockholm performs at Madam's Organ in 2011

Madam's Organ Blues Bar is a restaurant and nightclub located at 2461 18th Street NW in Washington, D.C.'s Adams Morgan neighborhood. A local landmark, the bar is popular for its nightly live music, especially blues and bluegrass. Regular performers include Bobby Parker, Ben Andrews, Catfish Hodge, and Bob Perilla & Big Hillbilly Bluegrass. The bar offers billiards, has a rooftop deck and serves soul food. Notable regular patrons have included Euan Blair, son of Tony Blair, and the late Soviet dissident artist Alexandr Zhdanov. Hungarian Ambassador András Simonyi was not only a regular patron but also performed with his band "Coalition of the Willing" for his Washington Diplomatic farewell party attended by a Washington A-list including European diplomats, United States Secretary of Homeland Security Michael Chertoff, and Prime Minister Ferenc Gyurcsány. Barbara and Jenna Bush have also been spotted there. Madam's Organ was described as a favored hangout by Playboy and Stuff, and was featured on the Wild On! travel series on E!.

== History ==
Madam's Organ was originally an art cooperative established in the 1970's. In 1992, it became a blues and bluegrass bar. Madam's Organ moved to its present location in 1997, after a temporary closure.

This location once housed the original Children's Supermart store, which was opened by Charles Lazarus in 1948 and later became the Toys "R" Us retail chain.

== Controversy ==
Mural at Madam's Organ Blues Bar

Madam's Organ features a large outdoor mural, which depicts "The Madam", the bar's burlesque mascot. The bar's owner, Bill Duggan, says he commissioned the mural as an artwork, but the Department of Consumer and Regulatory Affairs ruled it an advertisement because it includes the name of the establishment. In court, the owner refused to remove the wording from the breasts, claiming that to do so would only further expose 9' by 13' breasts. Since Madam's Organ did not have a permit for the mural, the bar owner was fined. The case remains in the Court of Appeals.
