= Dave Brandon =

American businessman (born 1952)

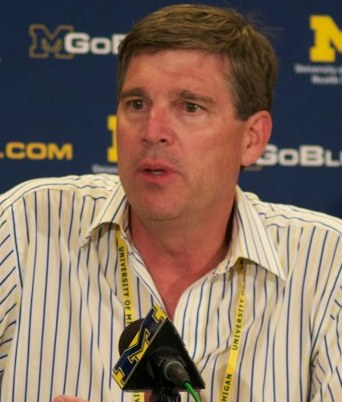
- Brandon in 2011
- Born: David Allen Brandon; May 15, 1952 (age 74); Dearborn, Michigan, U.S.
- Education: University of Michigan
- Occupations: Executive Chairman, Domino's Pizza
- Term: March 1999 – present
- Predecessor: Thomas Monaghan
- Political party: Republican
- Board member of: Domino's Pizza, Inc.
- Spouse: Jan
- Children: 6

David Allen Brandon (born May 15, 1952) is an American businessman. He is executive chairman of Domino's Pizza and former CEO of Toys "R" Us.

From 1999 to 2009, he served as the president and chief executive officer of Domino's, and from 2010 to 2014, he was the athletic director at the University of Michigan. Brandon took over Domino's in March 1999 when founder Tom Monaghan sold it to the investment group Bain Capital. Prior to Domino's, he was the CEO of Valassis Communications. He is also a former regent of the University of Michigan and former football player.

== Education ==
Brandon graduated with a bachelor's degree and teaching certificate from the University of Michigan in 1974. While in Ann Arbor, he was a back-up defensive end on the university's football team, under the leadership of Bo Schembechler.

Brandon has honorary doctorate degrees from Walsh College, Schoolcraft College, Lawrence Technological University, Cleary College, Central Michigan University, and Albion College.

On May 9, 2009, David received his honorary Doctorate of Humane Letters from Albion College during the college's commencement ceremonies, in Albion, Michigan. He also delivered a commencement address to the 2009 graduating class and finished his address by giving a graduation present to each of the graduates. Taped to the bottom of each of their seats was a coupon for a free pizza and a soda.

== Valassis ==
Brandon began working for Valassis in 1979 at age 27. Brandon described moving from Procter & Gamble to Valassis, then a small, family-owned coupon company, as a "culture shock." Over 20 years, Brandon rose in the company's ranks. He was promoted to executive vice president and chief operating officer of Valassis in 1986, then to chief executive officer in 1989.

During his tenure as CEO, Brandon organized Valassis's initial public offering in 1992 at $11.34 per share. Fortune selected Valassis as one of the 100 best companies to work for in 1997, 1998, and 1999.

== Domino's ==
Brandon became CEO of Domino's Pizza in March 1999 after its founder, Thomas Monaghan, sold his shares of the pizza chain to Bain Capital in order to start Ave Maria University.

Brandon led Domino's to its initial public offering in 2004 at $14 per share, raising $337 million. Under Brandon's direction, Domino's introduced the first pizza tracker, and added desserts and sub sandwiches to its menu. To promote the new products, Brandon appeared on a national TV commercial to burn a cease-and-desist letter from Subway. In 2009, Domino's changed its core pizza recipe in a move that Brandon called the "biggest product introduction we've done since… well, pizza." Over the course of Brandon's tenure, Bain received a 500% return on its initial investment. By December 31, 2009, around when Brandon left for the University of Michigan, the stock price had fallen to $8.38.

== Politics ==
Brandon was elected to the Board of Regents of the University of Michigan in 1998, as a member of the Republican Party. In the November 2006 election, he lost his reelection bid to Democrat Julia Donovan Darlow. His term expired December 31, 2006.

Brandon has donated to several Republican campaigns and conservative causes up until 2010.

== Television ==
On May 5, 2005, Brandon appeared on the third season of The Apprentice as part of the finale CEO interview panel. In an advertisement that first aired on January 21, 2009, David starred by "oven baking" a cease and desist order from Subway. He was seen putting the letter in a pizza oven, and the letter caught on fire. Subway had sent the letter to Domino's to stop advertisements for their new oven baked sandwiches that noted a 2 to 1 advantage over Subway's subs in an independent taste test.

== University of Michigan athletic director ==
On January 5, 2010, Brandon was named athletic director at the University of Michigan, succeeding Bill Martin. University President Mary Sue Coleman said she chose Brandon because she believed his financial management experience would serve the department well as it grew larger and increasingly complex. Soon after arriving, Brandon established a marketing department, which began investing in resources for athletes and established a student loyalty program. Within a few years, Brandon began returning surpluses in the hundreds of millions of dollars, which the university used for a number of major facilities improvements. An opinion editorial in the Detroit News credited Brandon with raising academic standards for athletes and bringing in more counseling and tutoring resources for athletes.

Michigan Athletics, under Brandon's leadership, raised student season ticket prices amid a slump in student attendance nationally, which drew scrutiny from student government officials after roughly a third fewer students bought season tickets.

On September 30, 2014, a graduate student posted a petition on the website of the University's Central Student Government asking that Brandon be fired. By midnight of October 1, the petition had grown to over 10,000 signatures. After Brandon revealed that Michigan quarterback Shane Morris played after exhibiting symptoms of a concussion, hundreds of students gathered at the home of University President Mark Schlissel calling for changes in the leadership of Michigan Athletics. Brandon resigned from the position on October 31, 2014.

USA Today described Brandon's tenure as the University of Michigan's athletic director as "peculiar and unsuccessful."

== Toys "R" Us ==
Toys "R" Us announced that Brandon would succeed Antonio Urcelay as CEO on June 2, 2015. Brandon was chosen for his track record of leading two private companies to their IPOs. In an interview with The Wall Street Journal, Brandon acknowledged that the owners of Toys R Us (Bain Capital and Vornado Realty Trust) would seek to exit the business, but emphasized the necessity of improving the company's performance: "The focus now is on execution, performance and growth. … The company needs to put itself in a position where it can compete globally."

On May 14, 2018, Brandon resigned as CEO of Toys "R" Us. He earned $11.25 million in compensation with the company in 2017.

=== Bankruptcy ===
On September 19, 2017, Toys "R" Us filed for Chapter 11 bankruptcy.

In a U.S Bankruptcy Court filing on March 15, 2018, the company determined that the best way to maximize their recoveries would be to liquidate the existing inventory. In response to the decision, Brandon explained "Toys R Us found itself in serious default on our financing covenants." Earnings following Christmas 2017 were about half of what the company typically earns in a normal year.

== DTE Energy ==
Brandon sits on the Board of Directors for Detroit Edison as the Finance, Organization & Compensation and Public Policy and Responsibility Committees.

Business positions
Preceded by Antonio Urcelay	Chairman & CEO of Toys "R" Us; July 2015 – May 2018	Vacant
Preceded by Tom Monaghan	Chairman & CEO of Domino's; March 1999 – present	Incumbent
