= Harold Kaplan =

American psychiatrist

- Born: Harold Irwin Kaplan; October 1, 1927; New York City
- Died: January 15, 1998 (aged 70); New York City
- Education: New York University (1949)
- Occupation: Psychiatrist
- Spouses: Helen Singer Kaplan (m. 1953; div 1968) Nancy Barrett (m. 1980; d. 1998)
- Children: 3

Harold Irwin Kaplan (October 1, 1927 - January 15, 1998) was a psychiatrist and founding editor of the Comprehensive Textbook of Psychiatry.

== Biography ==
Kaplan received his BA degree from New York University. In 1949, at age 21, he received his Doctorate in Medicine from New York Medical College.

During his medical career, Kaplan was Professor of Psychiatry at the NYU School of Medicine. He was also an Attending Psychiatrist at Bellevue Hospital, Lenox Hill Hospital, and NYU Langone Medical Center.

Kaplan was a Life Fellow of the American Psychiatric Association, the American College of Physicians, and the New York Academy of Medicine. He helped found the NYU-Bellevue Psychiatric Association of New York.

== Personal life and death ==
From 1953 to 1968 he was married to sex therapist Helen Singer Kaplan. He was also married to Dark Shadows actor Nancy Barrett. Kaplan died on January 15, 1998. He is survived by his children Phillip Kaplan, Peter Kaplan, and Jennifer Busansky in addition to his grandchildren Alexander D'Addio and Wildon Kaplan.

== Works ==
- Synopsis of Psychiatry
- Comprehensive Textbook of Psychiatry
- Study Guide and Self-Examination Review for Synopsis of Psychiatry
- Comprehensive Group Psychotherapy
- The Sexual Experience
- Clinical Psychiatry
- Pocket Handbook of Clinical Psychiatry
- Comprehensive Glossary of Psychiatry and Psychology
- Pocket Handbook of Psychiatric Drug Treatment
- Pocket Handbook of Emergency Psychiatric Medicine
- Studies in Human Behavior, 1-5
- The Human Animal
