= Alexandr Zhdanov =

Russian painter

- Александр Жданов
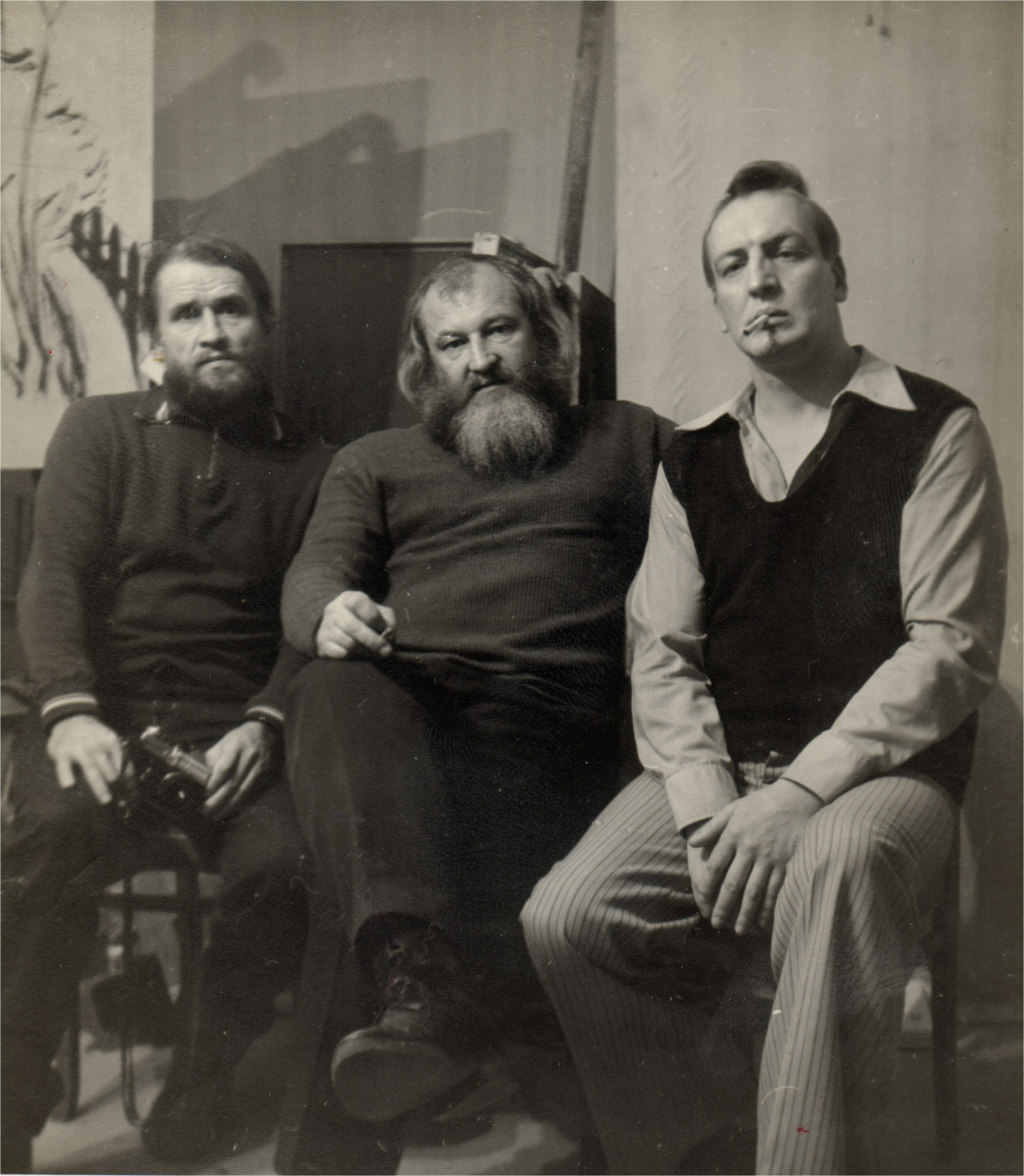
- V. Leshchenko, Zhdanov, L. Stukhanov. Москва, 1984
- Born: January 11, 1938
- Education: M.B. Grekov Rostov artistic school
- Known for: Painting, drawing

Alexandr Pavlovich Zhdanov (Russian: Александр Павлович Жданов; 11 January 1938 – 18 July 2006) was a Russian avant-garde painter.

== Biography ==
He was born in Vyoshenskaya, Soviet Union. Zhdanov was expelled four times from the Grekov Art School in Rostov-on-the-Don but managed to graduate after six years.

In 1973, he moved to Moscow and within a year was part of a group of artists who used a wooden fence as an exhibition until authorities knocked it down. The incident, which became known as the "Bulldozer Exhibition," was among the first overt acts of defiance by Moscow's artistic underground.

During the 1980s, his vigorous artwork was featured on U.S. television news, yet he was not allowed to show his work in official galleries or museums. He and his wife, Galina Gerasimova, staged periodic hunger strikes, and on 22 October 1987 they chained themselves to a tree outside the gate of the U.S. Embassy. In 1989, Mr. Zhdanov settled in Washington, where he made haunting, sometimes grotesque, paintings and built a reputation as a serious artist and an often-drunk bohemian. His favorite hangout was Madam's Organ Blues Bar in Adams Morgan, Washington, D.C.

As an artist, Mr. Zhdanov adopted an expressionistic style to depict the stark landscapes he knew during his youth in the southern part of the Soviet Union and Siberia. His early works were often dark and earthy, but in the United States he discovered bright acrylic paints, which brought a new light to his work. He had shows in galleries across the country, and dozens of his pieces hang in a collection of Soviet dissident art at the Jane Voorhees Zimmerli Art Museum at Rutgers University.

Some of Mr. Zhdanov's work was purely abstract, and he painted rugged, de Kooning-like portraits. But he was best known for his brooding nocturnal landscapes, which featured the moon, leafless trees and mysterious figures lurking in the gloom. He said the figures represented Pan, the mischievous Greek god of the wild, but some observers saw them as veiled images of himself.

On the open market, his paintings have sold for almost $50,000.
