= Nancy Barrett =

American actress

- Born: October 5, 1941 (age 84); Shreveport, Louisiana, U.S.
- Occupation: Actress
- Years active: 1966–2019
- Spouses: Ralph Pine (divorced); David Ford (m. 1967; div. 1969) Harold Kaplan (m. 1980; died 1998) Stuart S. Leichter (m. 2005; died 2017)

Nancy Barrett (born October 5, 1941) is an American former actress. She is best known for her portrayal of Carolyn Stoddard (among other characters) in the 1960s gothic soap opera Dark Shadows.

== Biography ==
Barrett was born in Shreveport, Louisiana, but most of her early life was spent in Bartlesville, Oklahoma. After completing high school, she entered Baylor University in Waco, Texas, but she spent her final year of college at UCLA.

After graduating from UCLA, she married Ralph Pine, her agent. The couple moved to New York City, New York, where she landed the role of Carolyn Stoddard on the gothic soap opera Dark Shadows in June 1966. While on the show, she met David Ford, who was one of the other actors on the show. Following her divorce from Pine, Barrett and Ford married in 1967; the marriage lasted two years. Barrett, Ford, and her future Dark Shadows co-star Jerry Lacy all appeared on stage at the Wayside Theatre in 1967.

While on Dark Shadows, she appeared in two films based on the series – House of Dark Shadows (1970) and Night of Dark Shadows (1971). The series itself was canceled in April 1971. She appeared in a total of 403 episodes.

Barrett married psychiatrist Harold Kaplan in the early seventies. Throughout that decade, she appeared on numerous soaps, including The Doctors, One Life to Live, and Ryan's Hope. She made her last onscreen appearance in 1986's Belizaire the Cajun.

In 2009, she reprised her role of Carolyn in the audio drama Curse of the Pharaoh and has continued to appear in various Dark Shadows audio dramas from Big Finish Productions. Barrett's husband, Harold Kaplan, died in January 1998. Since his death, she has appeared in the New York production of Francis Patrelle's The Yorkville Nutcracker, marking her ballet debut.

Nancy married practicing New York dentist Stuart S. Leichter D.D.S. in 2005. Leichter died in Arizona after a long illness in 2017.

== Filmography ==
- Dark Shadows (1966–1971) ... Carolyn Stoddard Hawkes, Millicent Collins Forbes, Charity Trask, Pansy Faye, Carolyn Stoddard Loomis, Leticia Faye, Melanie Collins Young, Amanda Collins (403 episodes)
- N.Y.P.D. (1967) ... Girl (Episode: "The Pink Gumdrop")
- House of Dark Shadows (1970) ... Carolyn Stoddard
- Night of Dark Shadows (1971) ... Claire Jenkins
- The Doctors (1971–1972) ... Kathy Ryker #2 (112 episodes)
- One Life to Live (1974) ... Rachel Wilson Farmer
- Ryan's Hope (1976) ... Faith Coleridge #2 (9 episodes)
- The Adams Chronicles (1976) ... Elizabeth Cameron (Episode: "Henry Adams, Historian")
- One Life to Live (1982) ... Debra Van Druden (Episode: "September 23, 1983")
- Belizaire the Cajun (1986) ... Rebecca
