= Catskill Game Farm =

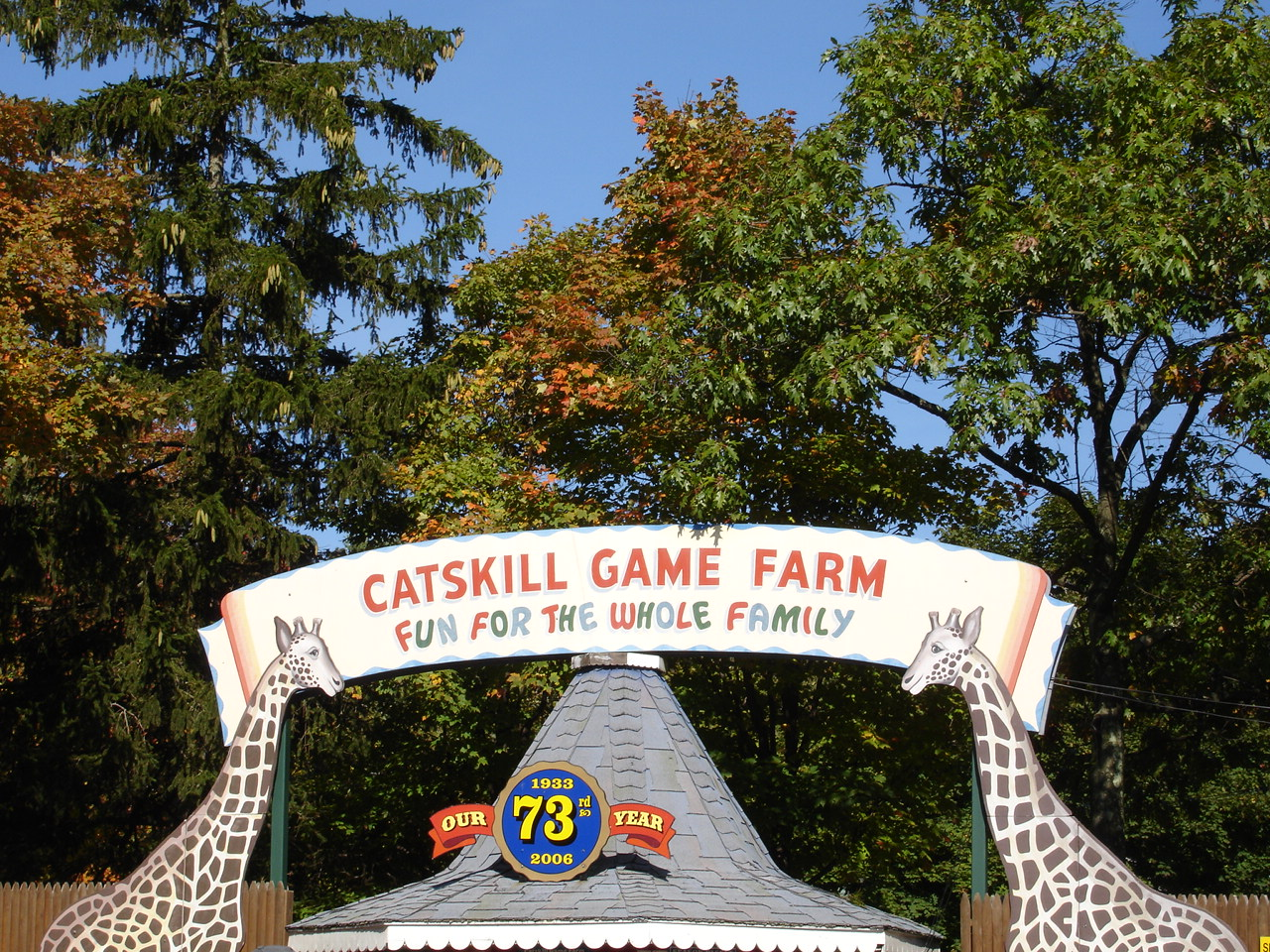
- Entrance sign in 2006
- Interactive map of Catskill Game Farm
- 42°14′17″N 74°0′30″W
- Date opened: 1933; 93 years ago
- Date closed: October 9, 2006; 19 years ago
- Location: Catskill, New York, U.S.
- Land area: 914 acres (370 ha)
- No. of animals: 2,000 (2006)
- No. of species: 150 (2006)

Catskill Game Farm Inc. was a family owned petting zoo in the town of Catskill, New York, United States, which operated from 1933 to 2006. The Game Farm closed permanently on Columbus Day October 9, 2006, after seventy-three years of operation.

The property was purchased by new owners in 2012 and the former giraffe barn has been developed into a hotel and opened in October 2019 following an extensive renovation of the existing building.

== History ==
The Catskill Game Farm was opened in 1933 by Roland Lindemann and it was sold to his daughter Kathie Schulz in 1989.

At first, it held only deer, donkeys, and sheep. In 1958, the United States Department of Agriculture recognized Catskill Game Farm as a zoo, and it became the first privately owned venture to achieve such status. The collection was then allowed to grow more exotic, and at the time of its closing, it hosted roughly 2,000 animals representing over 150 species, imported from around the world.

The zoo spanned more than 914 acres (370 ha), most of which was used to breed animals for other zoos worldwide. Only about 136 acres (55 ha) were available for public viewing, and then only in the summer and autumn.

In August 2006, the Catskill Game Farm announced that it would be closing on October 9 that year, ending over 70 years of operation citing declining business. Business peaked in the 1960s. An auction was held in October 2006 to sell off equipment and animals. The auction was held over two days and it attracted over 1,000 potential bidders from US, Canada and Mexico.

A 2026 documentary film, American Zoo, explores the history of the Catskill Game Farm and the work of its zoological director Heinz Heck.

=== April the Giraffe ===
A giraffe named April was born in 2000 at the Catskill Game Farm.

Upon the closing of the Catskill Game Farm in October 2006, April was first sold to Adirondack Animal Land, in Vail Mills, New York; and then to Animal Adventure Park, in Harpursville, New York, in 2015, where she resided until her death on April 2, 2021.

April became known internationally when a live video of the late stages of her pregnancy, along with her birth, were published on the Internet in 2017.

== Redevelopment ==
Ben and Cathy Ballone purchased the former Catskill Game Farm property in 2012. They established The Old Game Farm. They have been working to reopen the site as a family-oriented establishment once again, with the addition of a B&B, campground, and RV resort with animals. The new owners have developed the former giraffe barn into a hotel. It was the home of several generations and families of giraffes, including April which was born there in 2002. The Inn opened on Tuesday, October 1, 2019, following an extensive renovation of the existing building. The inn features five guest rooms and four campsites. An exhibit of memorabilia highlighting the history of the former Catskill Game Farm is displayed at the inn.
