= Geoffrey the Giraffe =

Mascot character of toy store

- Toys "R" Us character
- First appearance: October 17, 1965
- Created by: Charles Lazarus

In-universe information
- Species: Giraffe
- Gender: Male

Geoffrey the Giraffe is the mascot of the American toy store Toys "R" Us, introduced in 1965. Serving as a "spokesanimal" for the brand, he is an anthropomorphic giraffe. For many years, Geoffrey went through several design changes, originally having been 2D animated before being redesigned into a computer-generated mascot in 2001. In 2007, he was reverted back to 2D with the company's rebrand.

The parent company of Toys "R" Us used to be named Geoffrey LLC., named after the titular character of the franchise for many years until the company's bankruptcy in 2018.

== History ==
In the 1950s, Children's Bargain Town (the original iteration of the company) had a mascot, Dr. G. Raffe, who appeared in advertisements for the store.

Geoffrey was introduced as the company's mascot in 1965, finally taking on his current name. He started appearing in TV commercials and advertisements for the store starting in 1973. From the 1970s up until the late 1990s, Geoffrey had a family of many other members, including Gigi, his wife, Geoffrey Junior, and Baby Gee.

In 2001, Geoffrey was redesigned using a realistic giraffe, appearing in commercials exclusively from North America, with Jim Hanks (Tom Hanks' brother) voicing him, and usually, an animatronic was used for the commercials and for advertising.

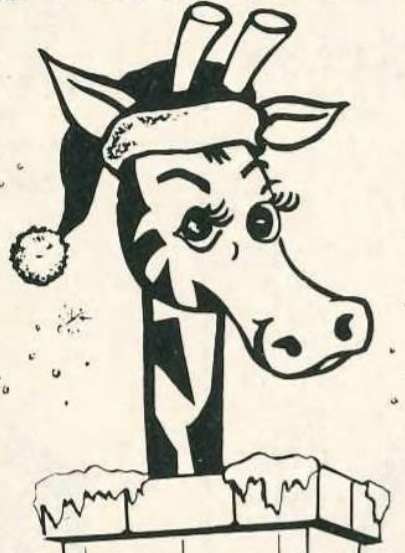
The 1965 iteration of Geoffrey the Giraffe

In 2007, Geoffrey was once again redesigned to his current design, being 2D again and having stars on him rather than circles.

In May 2018, during the company's bankruptcy and closing of all stores in the United States and the United Kingdom, the company announced that their mascot, Geoffrey would be auctioned off. However, in October of the same year, the auction was cancelled and the company decided to retain Geoffrey as their brand IP and trademark.
