= Antonio Urcelay =

Antonio Urcelay (born 1952) was Chairman of the Board, Chief Executive Officer and member of the Global Product Safety Policy Committee board of Toys "R" Us Inc. He retired from the company in June 2015.

== Toys "R" Us Inc. ==
Urcelay became CEO of Toys "R" Us in October 2013, and became Chairman a month later.

== Career ==
Antonio Urcelay worked in the consumer packaged goods and retail industry before taking up his position at Toys "R" Us. He was Managing Director for Leche Pascual S.A., head of the Spanish division of a dairy company and a member of the Board of Directors for the Ashley Group – the parent company of the above-mentioned dairy company. He also held a variety of top executive positions at Royal Ahold, being the Spanish market's Managing Director. Urcelay was also marketing manager at Procter & Gamble's Spanish subsidiary.

At the beginning of his career, Urcelay practiced law for five years at Cremades, ultimately becoming Partner.

== Education ==
Antonio Urcelay received a Juris Doctor from the Madrid-Complutense University in 1984.

== Compensation ==
Antonio Urcelay's compensation for the end of December 2013: Salary and Bonus: $1,389,685, Stock Awards, $416,680, Option Awards, $1,198,963. In addition, in 2014, he was ranked by NJBiz as Number 72 in "The 100 Most Powerful People in New Jersey Business."
