= Toys "R" Us =

American toy, clothing, and baby product retailer

- Logo used since September 2007
- Formerly: Children's Supermart (1948-1957)
- Type: Subsidiary
- Traded as: NYSE: TOY (until 2005)
- Industry: Retail
- Founded: April 1948; 78 years ago (original); June 1957; 69 years ago (brand); June 2022; 4 years ago (revival)
- Founder: Charles Lazarus
- Defunct: June 29, 2018; 8 years ago (original)
- Headquarters: United States
- Number of locations: 40 stores (excluding 451 branded concessions inside Macy's, 7 military stores, and various holiday shops)
- Owner: Toys R Us Co. Ltd (1948—2018): Tru Kids, Inc.; (2019—2021): WHP Global; (2021—present)
- Website: toysrus.com

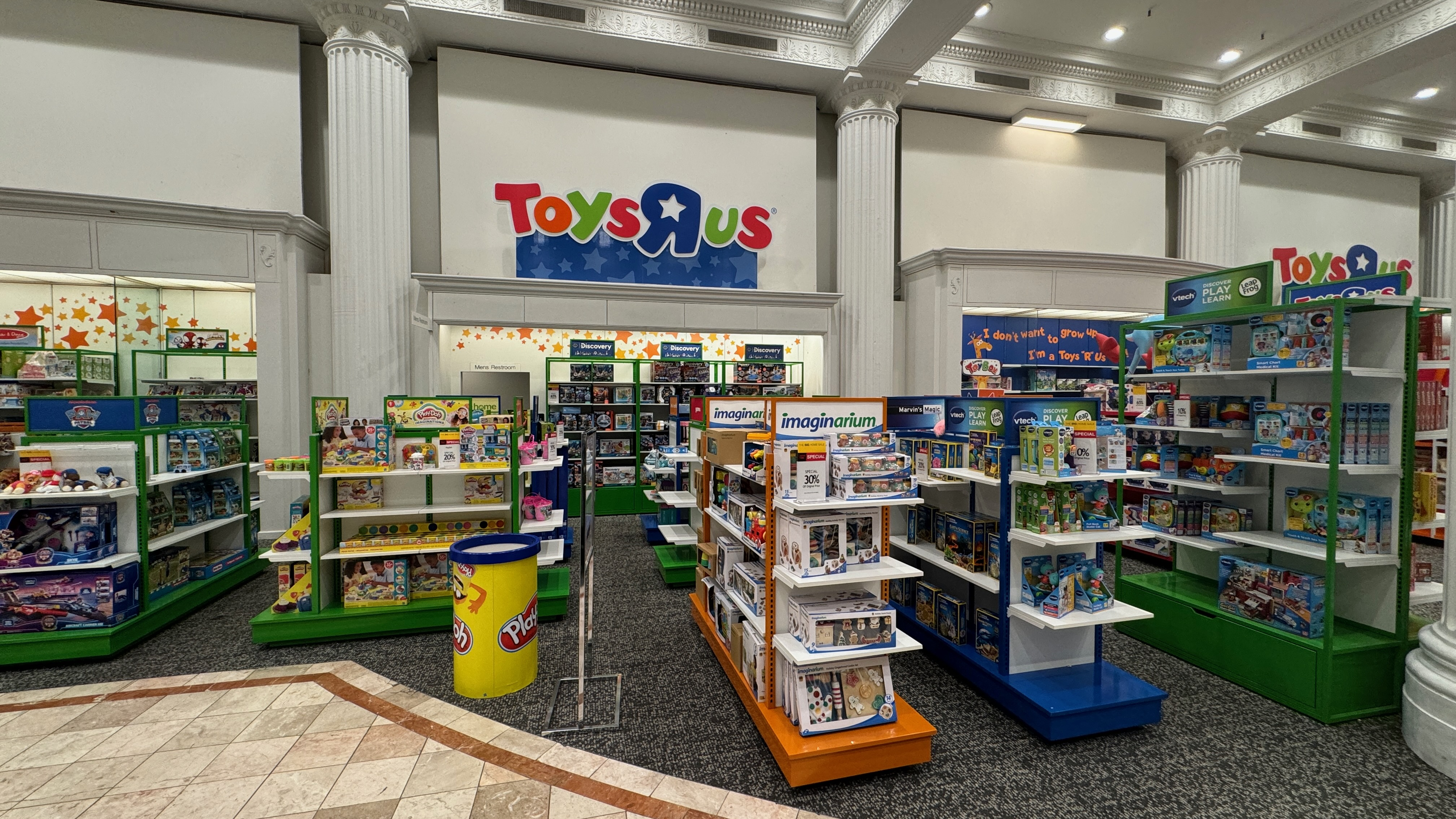
Toys "R" Us in Macy's Philadelphia flagship, February 4, 2024

Toys "R" Us is an American toy, clothing, and baby product retailer that was founded in April 1948 by Charles Lazarus in Washington, D.C. The retailer initially began as Children's Supermart, selling furniture until it refocused itself as Toys "R" Us in June 1957.

By the end of the 1970s, Toys "R" Us had opened locations across the United States, followed by another major growth in the 1980s to become one of the U.S.'s leading toy retailers. In the mid-1980s, it expanded internationally and established Canadian and British divisions.

In September 2017, Toys "R" Us filed for bankruptcy protection in the U.S. and Canada. In June 2018, Toys "R" Us closed its remaining 200 stores after entering bankruptcy, but certain international divisions outside the United States continued.

In January 2019, the global (excluding Canada) Toys "R" Us intellectual property was transferred to Tru Kids, Inc. In August 2021, Tru Kids announced that Toys "R" Us would be opening over 400 stores within Macy's starting in 2022. A few new standalone stores would open, starting late in 2021. The flagship store is located in New Jersey at the American Dream shopping and entertainment complex. A second flagship store was opened inside the Mall of America in Bloomington, Minnesota, in November 2023.

== History ==
The logo used from 1986 to August 31, 1998 in the United States and Canada, and in the United Kingdom and Ireland from 1985 to 2000

The logo used in the United States from September 1, 1998 to September 21, 2007

=== Origins and 20th century ===
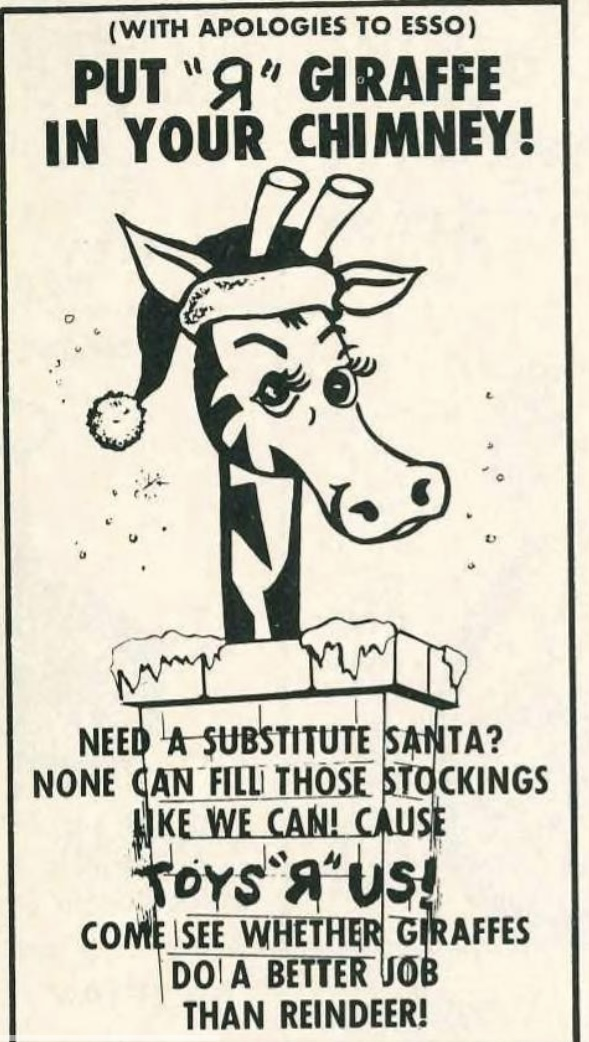
Advertisement featuring Geoffrey the Giraffe in 1965, playing off Esso's then-recent "Put a tiger in your tank" slogan.

In April 1948, Charles P. Lazarus founded a baby-furniture retailer, Children's Supermart, in Washington, D.C. during the postwar baby boom; the store's site at 2461 18th St NW later became Madam's Organ Blues Bar. The store was acquired in 1966 by Interstate Department Stores, Inc.

The focus of the store changed in June 1957, and the first Toys "R" Us, dedicated exclusively to toys rather than furniture, was opened by Lazarus in Rockville, Maryland. Lazarus also designed and stylized the Toys "R" Us logo, which featured a backwards "Я" to give the impression that a child wrote it. The store chain grew successfully and built a brand which was recognizable to many children born from the 1960s to the 1990s, and it shared in the success of the birth of popular culture successes of action figures (Star Wars, G.I. Joe), dolls (Cabbage Patch Kids, Rainbow Brite), video games (Nintendo's Super Mario series and other co-developed names, original Sega Genesis stations and titles), and ultimately the co-branded FAO series, as the higher-end FAO Schwarz stores folded.

In July 1996, Toys "R" Us introduced a new store format, Concept 2000, where stores featured blue facades with yellow-lined windows. The first store with this format was in Raritan, New Jersey.

=== 21st century ===
The board of directors installed John Eyler as CEO (formerly of FAO Schwarz) in May 2000. Eyler launched a plan to remodel and re-launch the chain. Blaming market pressures (primarily competition from Walmart and Target), Toys "R" Us considered splitting its toy and baby businesses. On March 17, 2005, a consortium of Bain Capital Partners LLC, Kohlberg Kravis Roberts (KKR) and Vornado Realty Trust announced a $6.6 billion leveraged buyout of the company. Public stock closed for the last time on July 21, 2005, at $26.75—a 63% increase since when it first announced that the company was put up for sale. Toys "R" Us became a privately owned entity after the buyout. The company still files with the Securities and Exchange Commission, as required by its debt agreements. Toys "R" Us announced plans for an IPO on May 28, 2010, but canceled them on March 29, 2013, citing market conditions. In March 2011, the Federal Trade Commission issued a $1.3 million civil penalty against Toys "R" Us due to the company having violated a previous 1998 antitrust order governing its dealings with its suppliers.

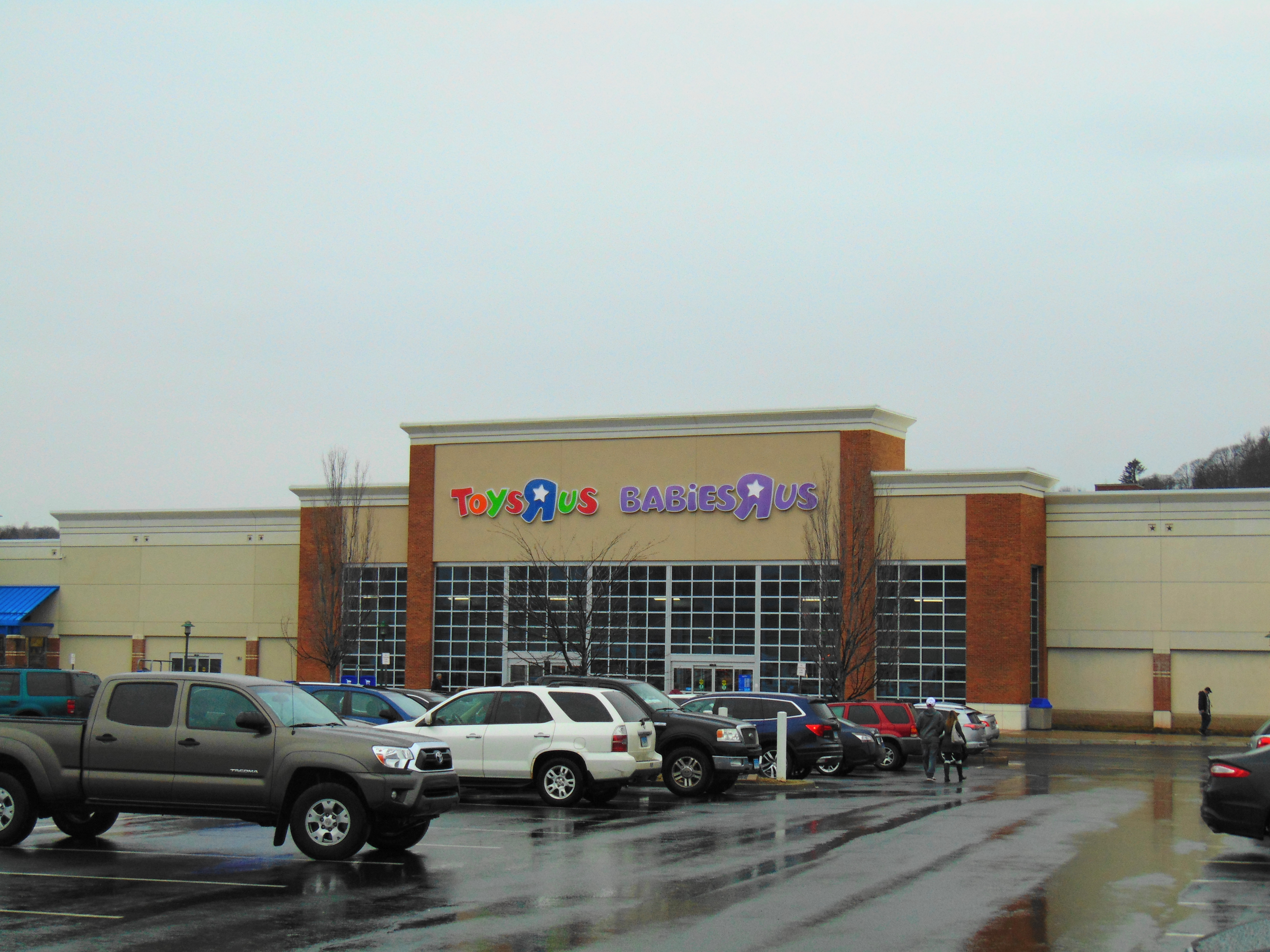
A Toys "R" Us/Babies "R" Us combined location in Waterbury, Connecticut, February 24, 2018. This was originally built as a Concept 2000 store in 1997.

In December 2013, eight days before Christmas, Toys "R" Us announced their stores in the United States would stay open for 87 hours straight. The flagship store of the retailer in Times Square was open for 24 hours a day from December 1 to 24, to cater to tourists. The announcement came after snow and rain caused a nearly 9 percent year-over-year decline in US store foot traffic. This move also pushed the retailer to hire an additional 45,000 seasonal workers to cater to the demand of the extended store hours. Since the toy business is highly seasonal, more than 40% of the company's sales come in during the last quarter of the year.

In 2014, Toys "R" Us announced its "TRU Transformation" strategy, which concentrated on efforts to fix foundational issues affecting future growth, including making stores less cluttered, improving the customer experience, clearer pricing strategies and promotions, and tighter integration of its retail and online businesses. In 2015, the company launched the first of a new concept store called the "Toy Lab" in Freehold, New Jersey. The new layout provided more space for interactive exhibits and areas to play with new toys before purchase. This concept has since been expanded to stores in California, Delaware, Florida, New York and Pennsylvania.

== Bankruptcy ==
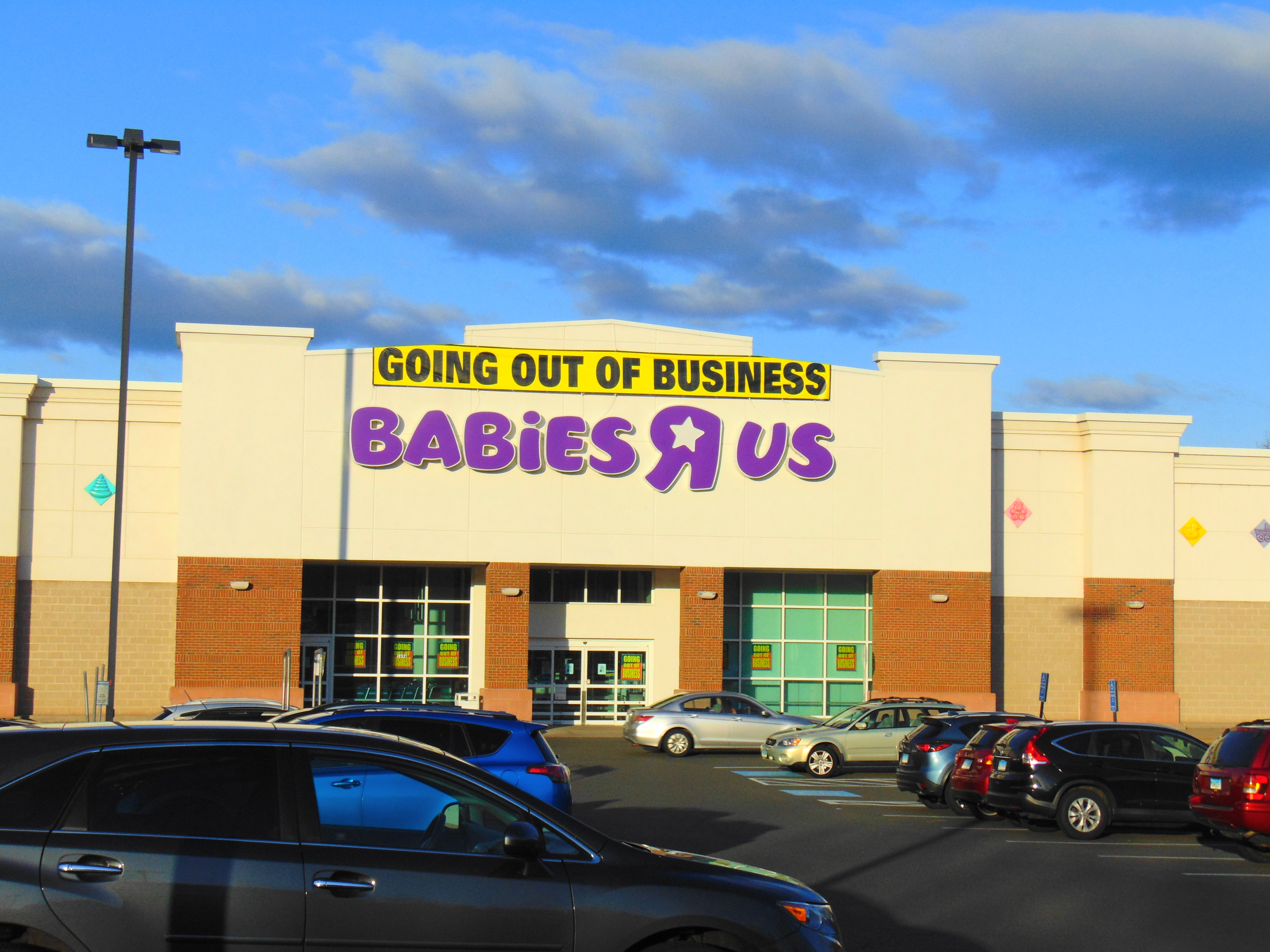
A closing Babies "R" Us store in Manchester, Connecticut, April 20, 2018

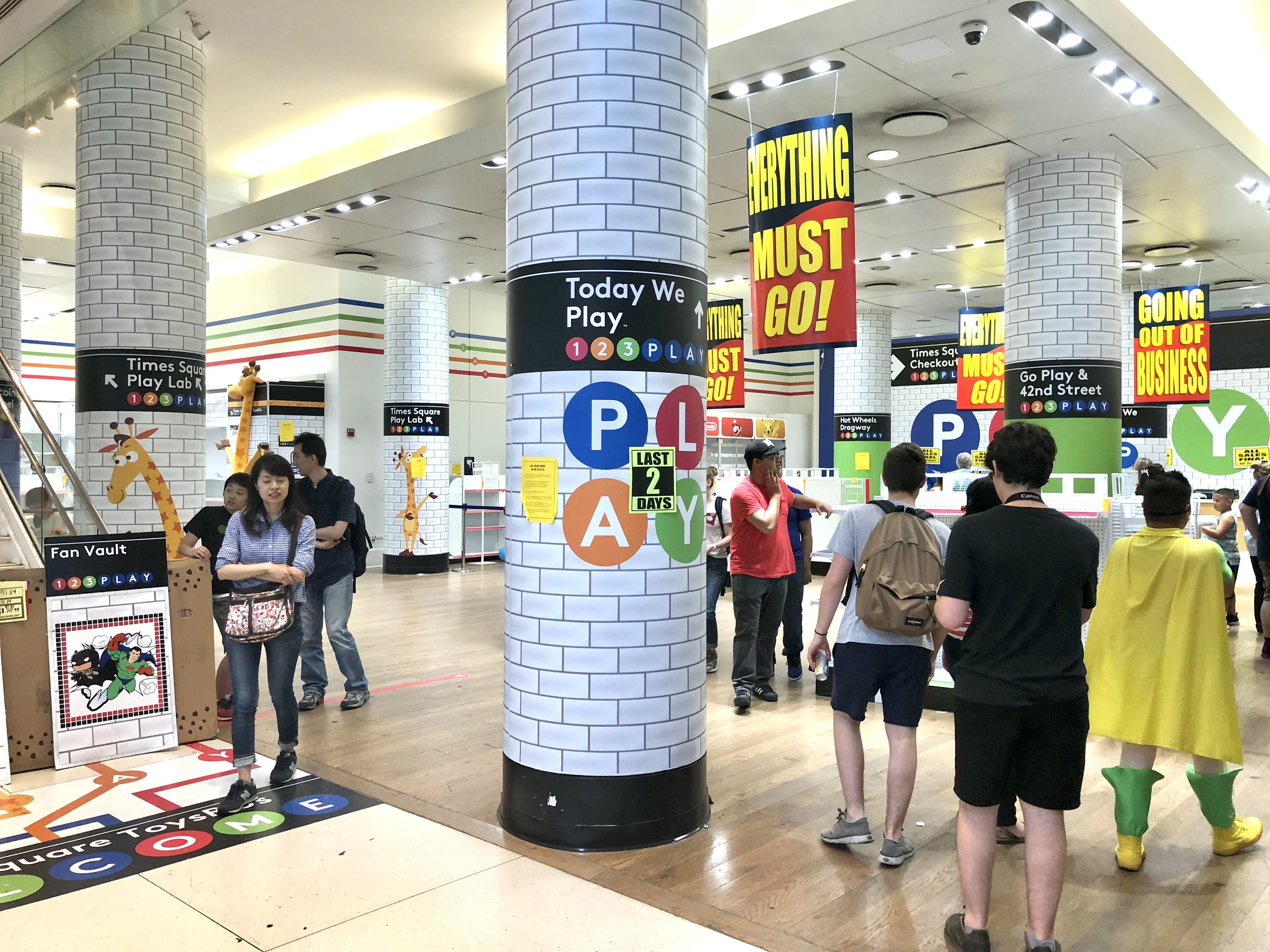
Inside the Toys "R" Us store in Times Square, Manhattan, two days before closing, May 26, 2018

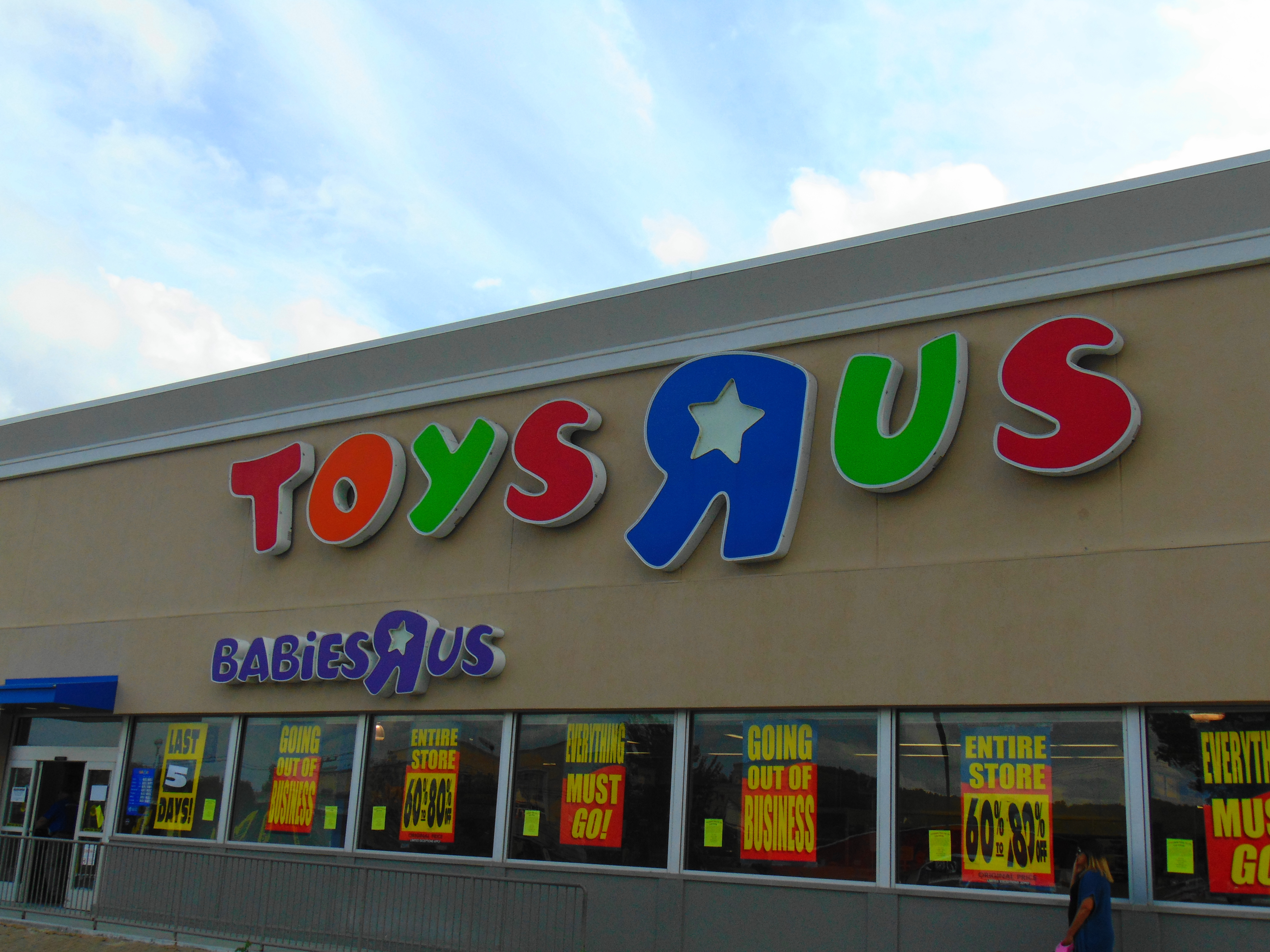
A closing Toys "R" Us store in Auburn, Massachusetts, on June 24, 2018

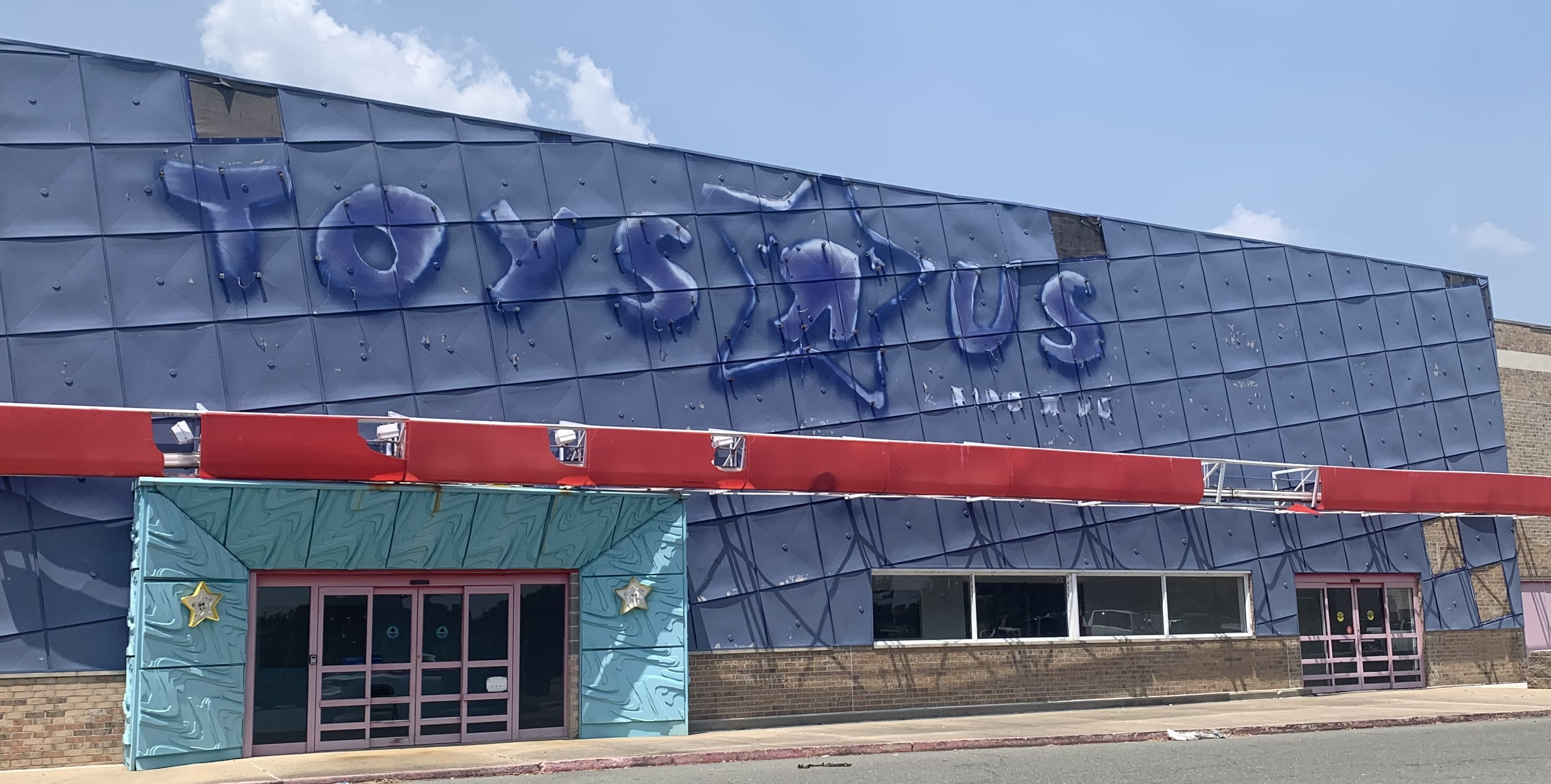
An abandoned Toys "R" Us in Monroe, Louisiana, on August 25, 2023

On September 18, 2017, Toys "R" Us, Inc. filed for Chapter 11 bankruptcy, stating the move would give it flexibility to deal with $5 billion in long-term debt by borrowing $2 billion to pay suppliers for the upcoming holiday season and invest in operations. The company has not had an annual profit since 2013. It reported a net loss of US$164 million in the quarter ending April 29, 2017. It lost US$126 million in the same period in the prior year. It had been paying US$400 million per year to service its debt, which prevented it from investing in improvements to in-store experiences to compete with Amazon and Walmart. Although the "retail apocalypse" was a factor, some analysts cited that the rapid increase in debt occurred under its private equity ownership. The company was reported to have a total workforce of 64,000 in September 2017.

It was initially stated that only the US and Canadian operations would be affected, and that its brick-and-mortar stores and online sales sites would continue to operate. In January 2018, the company announced it would liquidate and close up to 182 of its stores in the US as part of its restructuring, as well as convert up to 12 stores into co-branded Toys "R" Us and Babies "R" Us stores.

On February 28, 2018, it was reported that the company was exploring retaining its stronger Canadian operations, and the divestiture of some of its corporate-owned stores to franchises (leaving approximately 200 in a downsized chain). Toys "R" Us Inc. later announced that all US locations would be closed.

On March 15, 2018, Toys "R" Us received approval from the bankruptcy court to liquidate its stores. There were buyers interested in acquiring groups of stores to use as showrooms, as well as others interested in acquiring the chain's brand and associated intellectual property. The company indicated in filings that the Canadian operations were profitable, and desired to preserve the operations of the 82-store chain through a sale. MGA Entertainment had made an offer to acquire the Canadian operations. MGA Entertainment CEO Isaac Larian attempted to raise $200 million through investments and public crowdfunding to purchase at least 400 of the US locations.

Liquidation sales began on March 23, 2018. The chain's online store shut down on March 29, redirecting visitors to information on the liquidation and closures. On April 24, 2018, it was announced that the Canadian division would be sold to Fairfax Financial for approximately $234 million, and would continue to operate the locations under the Toys "R" Us name. Fairfax stated that it was potentially interested in purchasing US locations as an extension of these Canadian operations.

On April 13 2018, a bid was made by Isaac Larian to buy 356 Toys "R" Us stores for $890 million, but was rejected on April 17 and was fully scrapped on April 23.

On June 29, 2018, Toys "R" Us permanently closed all of its remaining US locations, after 70 years of operations. In early July 2018, it was reported that unknown benefactors had bought all of the remaining stock of two locations in North Carolina so they could be donated to charity.

In November 2018, Fortune noted that the absence of the retailer during the 2018 holiday season represented a US$4 billion chunk of toy sales from which other retailers could benefit. Party supply retailer Party City capitalized on the closures by establishing temporary pop-up stores under the branding Toy City, some of which filled vacancies left by Toys "R" Us locations.

== Restructuring, Tru Kids, Inc., WHP Global, second restructuring, and third restructuring ==
On October 1, 2018, the company issued a bankruptcy court filing which stated that it would no longer auction off its intellectual property, since its controlling lender planned to "[revive] the business behind the Toys 'R' Us and Babies 'R' Us brand names" with a focus on maintaining existing licensing agreements and establishing new retail opportunities. The company evaluated that selling its brand at auction "[was] not reasonably likely to yield a superior alternative."

At the Toy Industry Association's Fall Toy Preview, the company unveiled plans for a preliminary venture to be known as Geoffrey's Toy Box, a wholesale store-within-a-store concept that the company planned to deploy in time for the holiday shopping season. The company planned to revive the Toys "R" Us and Babies "R" Us brands in the future. In November 2018, it was announced that grocery market chain Kroger would add toy displays under the Geoffrey's Toy Box brand to some of its locations, to sell selections of Toys "R" Us private-label products. The brand operates under Geoffrey LLC, an intellectual property holding company within Toys "R" Us.

On January 20, 2019, the company emerged from bankruptcy as Tru Kids.

=== Relaunch ===
As of June 21, 2019, the company planned to open new stores in the US slated to be 10,000 square feet (930 m^{2}), roughly a third of the size of the big box brand that closed in 2018. On November 27, 2019, Toys "R" Us opened a retail store at Westfield Garden State Plaza in Paramus, New Jersey. On December 7, 2019, a second location was opened at The Galleria in Houston, Texas.

On October 8, 2019, the company relaunched the Toys "R" Us website, which would feature a focus on resources and videos highlighting popular toys. The site was established in partnership with Target, with users being redirected to Target.com to place their orders. In 2020, the agreement lapsed, and Amazon replaced Target as the site's fulfillment partner.

In 2021, as a result of financial losses caused by the COVID-19 pandemic, the only two US stores once again closed down. The Houston location closed on January 15, 2021, and the Paramus location closed on January 26, 2021. The company stated that they made a strategic decision to pivot their store strategy, so they can look for new stores and platforms that will offer better traffic and that they continue to invest in channels where customers will want to experience their brand.

On March 15, 2021, brand management company WHP Global announced it acquired a controlling interest in Tru Kids, Inc., the parent company of the Toys "R" Us, Babies "R" Us, and Geoffrey the Giraffe brands. Going forward WHP will be managing Tru Kids business, and help guiding its expansion. In North America WHP plans to open Toys "R" Us stores, again — ideally ahead of the holiday season and could come on various formats to include flagships, pop-ups, airport locations or mini stores inside other retailers' shops. WHP has not yet set a number of locations it plans to open in the United States. WHP is backed by a $350 million equity commitment from funds that are managed by Oaktree Capital Management. Financial terms of the deal have yet to be disclosed.

On August 19, 2021, WHP announced a new shift in branding by partnering with Macy's to sell toys on the retailer's website and open store-within-a-store locations at 400 department store locations.

On December 16, 2021, Toys "R" Us opened a two-story flagship store at a size of 20,000 square feet (1,858 m^{2}) in the American Dream Mall in East Rutherford, New Jersey.

On August 7, 2022, Toys "R" Us opened new locations in nine states: California, Georgia, New Jersey, Illinois, Nevada, Louisiana, New York, Maryland, and Missouri. These stores are located inside Macy's stores and range from 1,000 to 10,000 square feet (93 to 929 m^{2}). The company opened a store in every Macy's location in the United States by October 15, 2022, just in time for the holiday season.

A second flagship store was opened inside the Mall of America in Bloomington, Minnesota in November 2023.

On September 29, 2023, WHP announced their intention to open 24 new physical stores in the United States. These stores would be stand-alone locations and would begin to open in 2024. WHP also announced smaller stores that would be located in airports and cruise ships. The first of these smaller stores opened in November 2023, and is located in Dallas Fort Worth International Airport.

Two additional flagship stores were opened during the 2024 holiday season, one at Harlem Irving Plaza in Norridge, Illinois, and a second at Tanger Outlets in San Marcos, Texas.

On June 5, 2025, only 6 years to the day of the partnership, the new ASX-listed Australian arm went back into voluntary administration after years of losses. The former subsidiary was previously liquidated by administrators in 2018 and was taken up by Hobby Warehouse as an online store from 2019. On July 31, 2025, the company was taken over by Directed Electronics Australia in a deed of company arrangement and removed from the ASX.

On September 16, 2025, the company announced plans to open ten new flagship stores and 20 seasonal holiday shops by the end of 2025. The first flagship would open at Chicago Premium Outlets in Aurora, Illinois on September 20, 2025. The locations of all twenty seasonal holiday shops and eight of the ten flagship stores were revealed on October 16, 2025. The second new flagship store was opened in Camarillo Premium Outlets in Camarillo, California on October 25, 2025, with the third following a week later at Jordan Creek Town Center in West Des Moines, Iowa on November 1. Additional flagship stores have opened in Arundel Mills in Hanover, Maryland, Westroads Mall in Omaha, Nebraska, Denver Premium Outlets in Thornton, Colorado, Tanger Outlets Deer Park in Deer Park, New York, and Towne East Square in Witchita, Kansas by the end of 2025.

A relaunch store in Allen, Texas, on November 2nd, 2026

On September 18, 2026, the company announced that it was opening 120 standalone Toys “R” Us locations through a partnership with Go! Retail Group this holiday season.The top toy brands they plan to offer in these stores will include Pokémon; major sports leagues like NFL, FIFA, and MLB; Marvel, Star Wars, Hot Wheels, and LEGO Botanicals. Select locations will also feature candy shops, cafés and Creator Studios, where influencers and toy companies can create content and host product launches.

"This is a major moment for Toys ‘R’ Us as we significantly expand our presence across the United States," Jamie Uitdenhowen, executive vice president of Toys R Us at parent company WHP Global, said in a statement.

Go! Retail Group CEO Gideon Schlessinger said the companies expect the 160 standalone stores to bring the Toys R Us shopping experience to millions of customers during the holidays.

== Arrival in Latin America and the Caribbean ==
On October 27, 2023, Toys "R" Us opened its first store in Mexico through a partnership with the department store chain Liverpool. Located in Mexico City's Galerías Insurgentes shopping center, it was the first Toys "R" Us store in Latin America. In late 2024, the Babies "R" Us concept was launched within the store located in the Patio Santa Fe shopping center.

In 2024, it was announced that Toys "R" Us and Babies "R" Us would arrive in Latin America and the Caribbean by 2025. The brands' parent company, WHP Global, has partnered with Cotton Candy International in Panama, Corporación Cobos & Cobos in Ecuador, and Ripley in Chile and Peru to bring the Toys "R" Us and Babies "R" Us brands to Latin America.

In November 2025, Toys "R" Us arrived in Chile, opening its first store in the Ripley store at the Parque Arauco shopping center in Las Condes. This was the first Toys "R" Us in South America. On November 9, the store opened its second location in the Ripley store at the Mall Marina in Viña del Mar. Toys "R" Us also arrived in Peru on November 15, opening its first location in the Ripley store at Jockey Plaza in Lima. In July 2026, it opened a store at Soho Mall in Panama City, Panama.

== Flagship store in Times Square ==
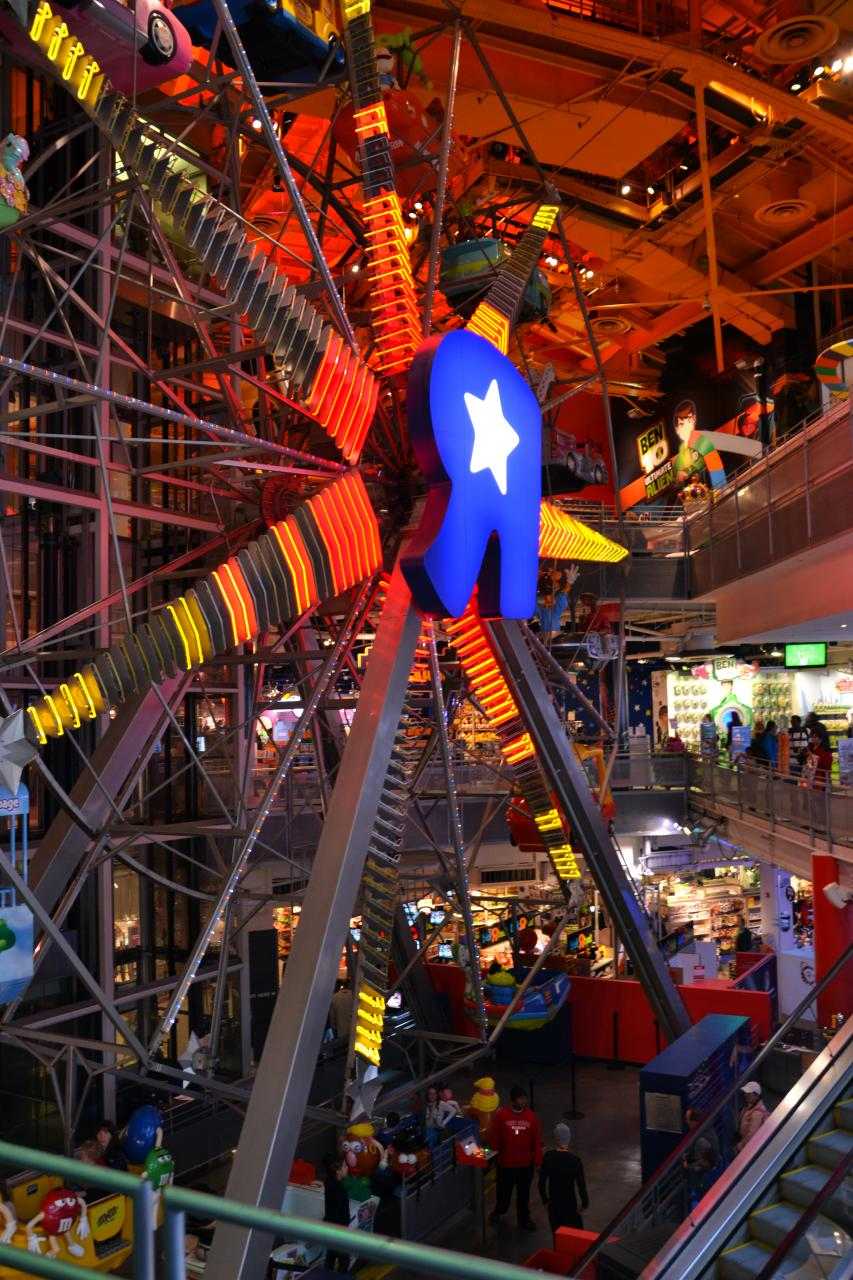
New York flagship store interior on October 24, 2011

On November 17, 2001, Toys "R" Us opened an international flagship store in New York's Times Square at a cost of $35 million. The 110,000 square feet (10,000 m^{2}) store included various themed zones such as Barbie (with a life-size dreamhouse), Jurassic Park (with an animatronic T-Rex), Lego, and the signature indoor Ferris wheel. The flagship store also served as a gaming destination, partnering with Microsoft to be the world's first location to launch the original Xbox console on November 15, 2001. In 2006, the store added a Dance Dance Revolution SuperNova arcade machine in its electronics department. The store later added a full amusement arcade, known as "R"Cade.

In August 2017, Toys "R" Us announced a 35,000 square-foot temporary store near the original one that would be open around the Christmas shopping season.

== Charitable giving ==
From 2004 until the company's end in 2018, Toys "R" Us Inc., the former owner of Toys "R" Us, had partnered with the Toys for Tots foundation to serve as a donation site for anyone donating unwrapped toys or monetary gifts. However, there is no evidence that the current parent, Tru Kids Inc., has continued Toys "R" Us's relationship with Toys for Tots and the Toys for Tots Foundation has not included any recent information on their website concerning Toys "R" Us since the Toys "R" Us Inc. bankruptcy filing in 2018.

== Product safety ==
Toys "R" Us had reportedly implemented high safety standards in 2007 and had vowed to take an aggressive approach towards holding vendors accountable for meeting those standards. Former chairman and CEO Gerald L. Storch, testifying before the Senate Appropriations Subcommittee on Financial Services and General Government on toy safety in September 2007, said he supported new legislation strengthening toy-safety standards and outlined new initiatives the retailer had set forth to ensure that its customers receive timely information on recalls (including a new website).

In 2008, the company introduced stricter product safety standards exceeding federal requirements. Among the new standards was a requirement for materials inside toys to meet a standard of 250 parts per million of lead for all products manufactured exclusively for the retailer (compared with the federal standard of 600 ppm). Toys "R" Us also announced the requirement that baby products be produced without the addition of phthalates, which have raised concerns about infant safety. The company had adjusted its requirements to meet new federal standards enacted with the Consumer Product Safety Improvement Act of 2008.

== Feature film ==
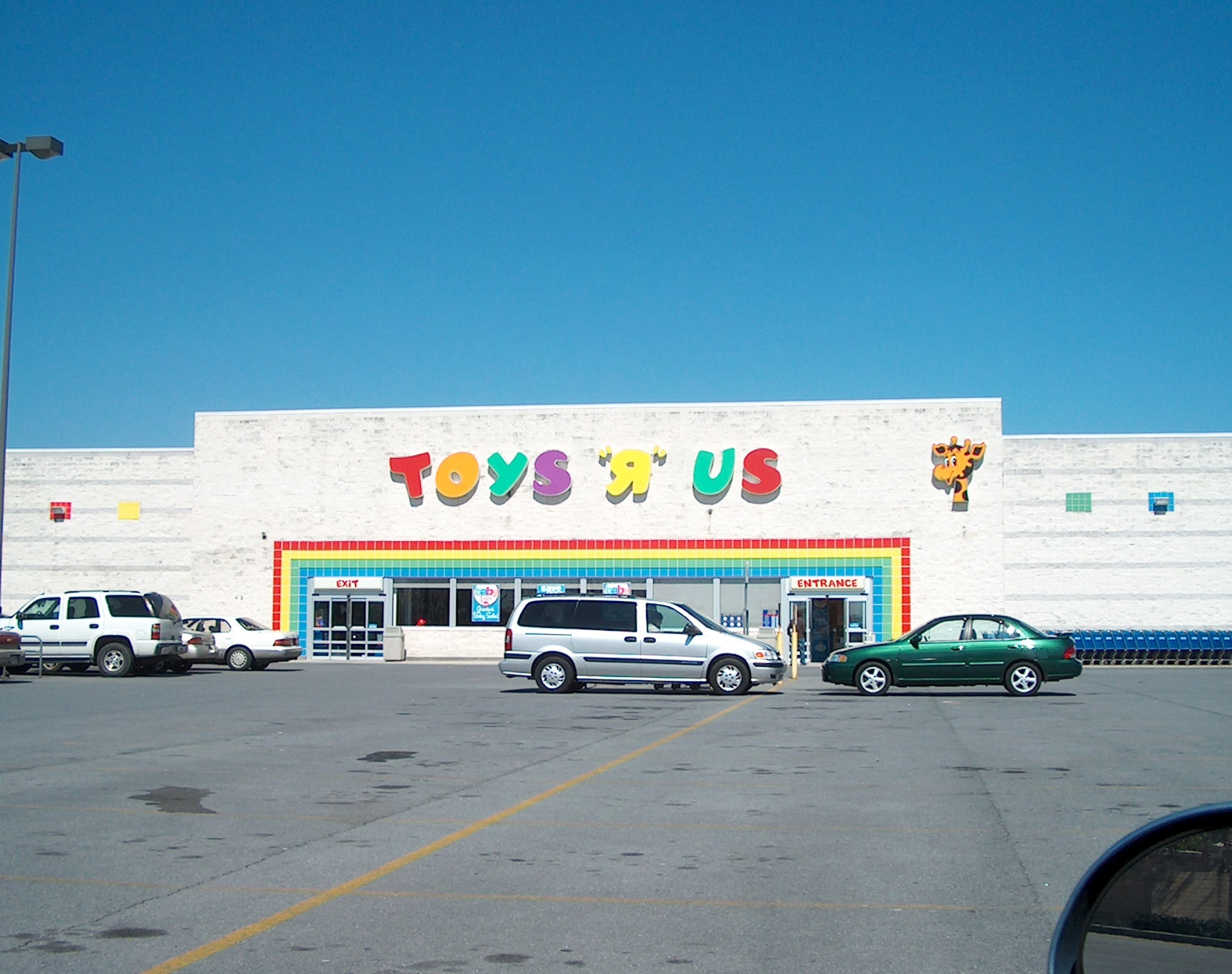
A Toys "R" Us store in Rome, Georgia, taken in 2006. After the store's closure, the site became the filming location of Spirit Halloween: The Movie.

A feature film is in development, produced by Story Kitchen and Toys “R” Us Studios, as announced on April 22, 2025. Toys "R" Us was also featured in several feature films, including The Blues Brothers (1980), Eloise at Christmastime (2003), which featured the Times Square flagship store, and Roofman (2025). Spirit Halloween: The Movie (2022) was filmed at a Spirit Halloween formerly occupied by Toys "R" Us.

== Other brands ==
=== Imaginarium ===
Imaginarium was a private label brand of Toys "R" Us for most of their toys that was acquired in 1999. Originally after the acquisition by Toys "R" Us in 1999, it also operated stores until 2004.

=== Kids "R" Us ===
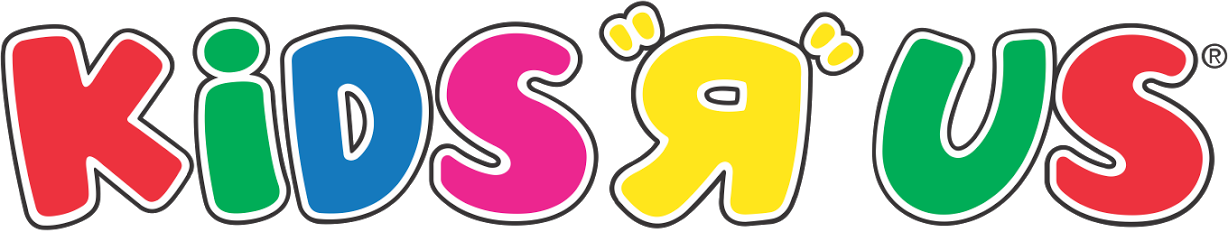
The logo used for Kids "R" Us

Kids "R" Us was an American children's discount clothing retailer. Their first stores opened in February 1983 in Paramus, New Jersey, and Brooklyn, New York. The chain folded in January 2004 after the retailer suffered deteriorating same-store sales and to focus more on the Toys "R" Us brand. While the standalone stores closed in 2003, the stores combined with Toys "R" Us would stay until at least 2007 when they all closed.

=== Babies "R" Us ===
Babies "R" Us
- Type: Subsidiary
- Industry: Retail
- Founded: April 1996; 30 years ago
- Headquarters: United States
- Number of locations: 1 (2023)
- Parent: Tru Kids, Inc.
- Website: babiesrus.com babiesrusad.com (shopping, American Dream)

The first Babies "R" Us store opened in April 1996 in Westbury, New York. In February 1997, Toys "R" Us acquired Duncan, South Carolina-based Baby Superstore, Inc., a 78-store chain founded by Greenville native Jack Tate, for $376 million. The locations were converted into Babies "R" Us. The store operates as a specialty baby products retailer and grew to about 260 stores in the United States. The stores offer an assortment of products for newborns, infants, and toddlers. The company also maintains a registry and offers pre- and post-natal classes and events.

In 2011, Toys "R" Us began to open co-branded locations with Babies "R" Us departments at 21 new locations and 23 remodeled locations.

Babies "R" Us reopened in July 2023 with a new flagship location inside the American Dream mall in East Rutherford, New Jersey.

In 2023 and 2024, Babies "R" Us expanded to Brazil, opening stores in the cities of São Bernardo do Campo and Itupeva, in the state of São Paulo; and in Rio de Janeiro, at the Outlet Premium shopping malls.

On May 10, 2024, it was announced that Babies "R" Us would be opening 200 store-within-a-store locations inside of Kohl's. These locations opened in the fall of 2024.

=== FAO Schwarz ===
In May 2006, Toys "R" Us, Inc., acquired toy retailer FAO Schwarz including the retailer's flagship store on Fifth Avenue in New York City, as well as its e-commerce site, FAO.com. The company closed the FAO Schwarz flagship store in New York on July 15, 2015, citing rising rental costs, but continued to carry FAO Schwarz-branded toys in its Toys "R" Us and Babies "R" Us stores until 2017.

=== Toys "R" Us Express ===
For the 2009 holiday-shopping season, Toys "R" Us tried a smaller-store concept to attract customers and 90 "Holiday Express" stores across the United States and Canada were opened. The Holiday Express stores are smaller than regular Toys "R" Us stores, often in malls, and offer a more limited selection of merchandise than would be available at a stand-alone Toys "R" Us store. Most (if not all) of these 90 stores were opened in shopping-center and mall spaces that had been vacated by store chains closing their doors during the recession (including KB Toys, several of which were taken over by Toys "R" Us). Toys "R" Us's plan was to keep the Holiday Express stores open until early January 2010 and close them shortly thereafter, but the success of so many prompted the company to reconsider and several were kept open. These stores are known as "Toys "R" Us Express". Beginning in May 2010, Toys "R" Us opened a total of 600 Express stores. Four more were converted to Toys "R" Us outlet stores. As with the larger basic Toys "R" Us stores, these locations also closed along with the outlet stores in the United States during summer 2018.

=== Online operations ===
The former logo of toysrus.com

Toys "R" Us began selling toys online with the launch of Toysrus.com in 1998. Following a disastrous Christmas 1999 trading period during which the company failed to deliver gifts on time, Toys "R" Us entered into a ten-year contract with online retailer Amazon in 2000 to be the exclusive supplier of toys on the website. Amazon eventually reneged on the terms of the contract by allowing third-party retailers to use its marketplace to sell toys, citing Toys "R" Us's failure to carry a sufficiently large range of goods, including the most popular lines. In 2006, Toys "R" Us successfully sued Amazon; the company was awarded $51 million in damages in 2009, just over half of the $93 million initially claimed.

It placed at No. 29 in the Internet Retailer Top 500 Guide for 2012. Toysrus.com was one of the most visited sites in the specialty toy and baby products retail category with an assortment of toys. In addition, Babiesrus.com offered a wide selection of baby products and supplies and access to the company's baby registry.

Looking to expand its web portfolio, in February 2009, the company acquired online toy seller eToys.com from Parent Co., which filed for bankruptcy protection in December 2008. Financial terms were not disclosed. Around the same time, it was reported that Toys "R" Us, Inc. bought Toys.com for an estimated $5.1 million. Today, the company operates Toys.com to list unadvertised and exclusive deals available on its portfolio of e-commerce sites.

In 2010, Toys "R" Us, Inc. reported that its Internet sales grew 29.9% year-over-year to $782 million from $602 million, and in April 2011, the company announced plans to open a dedicated e-commerce fulfillment center in McCarran, Nevada. The company later reported online sales of $1 billion for 2011 and $1.1 billion for 2012.

Under Tru Kids, the Toys "R" Us website was revived in 2019 in partnership with Target. Online orders were being redirected to Target.com for fulfillment. In 2020, the site switched to Amazon as its fulfillment partner. This lasted until 2021, when fulfillment was handed over to Macys.com as part of their deal with Toys "R" Us.

== Marketing ==
=== Mascot ===
The current iteration of Geoffrey the giraffe

Formerly known as "Dr. G. Raffe" in 1950s print advertisements for Children's Bargaintown, Geoffrey the Giraffe evolved in name and appearance over the next decade to become the official mascot of the renamed Toys "R" Us. He also made his first TV commercial appearance on television in 1973. Serving as a "spokesanimal" for the brand, Geoffrey's design went through several phases for more than 50 years before the star-spotted iteration was finalized in November 2007.

In 2017, the company sponsored the live camera broadcast for April the Giraffe, which helped support giraffe conservation and awareness. The sponsored camera of pregnant April the giraffe went viral with millions of views on YouTube and across social media platforms.

=== AI-generated commercial ===
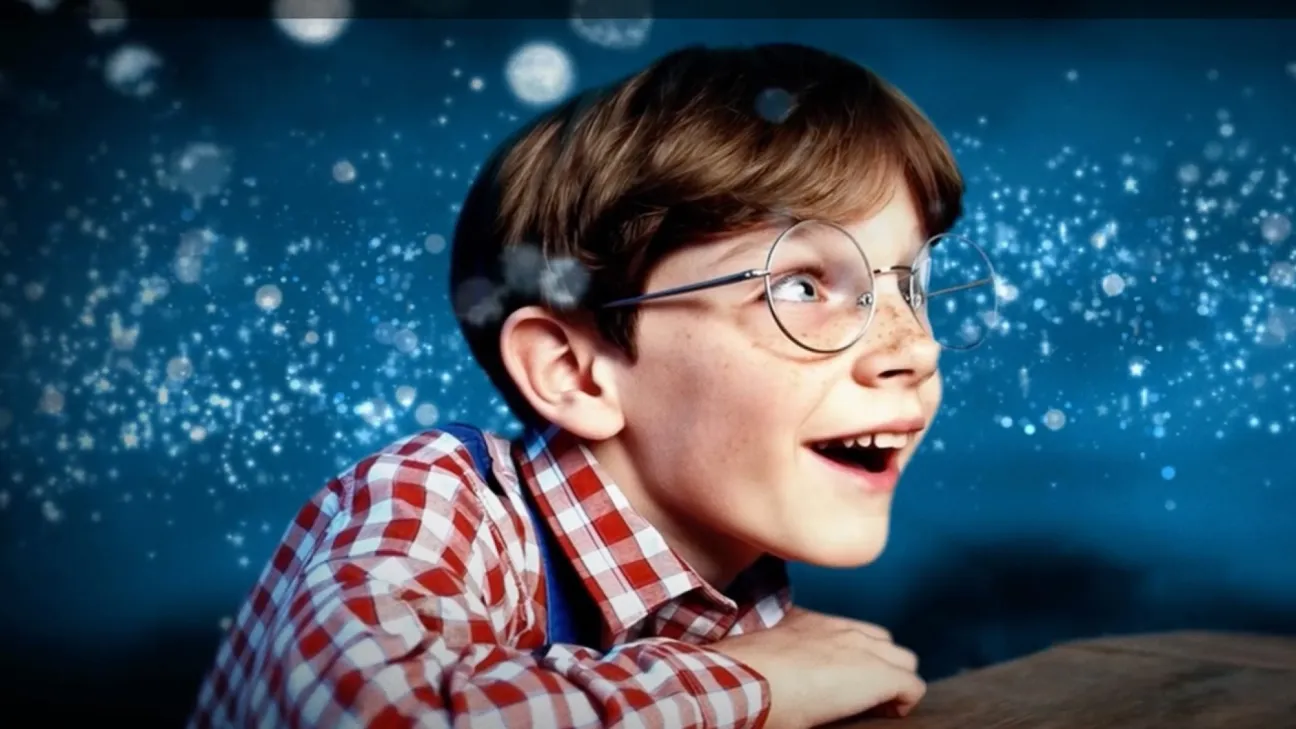
A scene from the AI-generated commercial

In 2024, Toys "R" Us debuted the first commercial made with the AI video generation tool Sora. The commercial depicts founder Charles Lazarus as a boy, falling asleep in his father's bike shop and dreaming of Geoffrey the Giraffe in a surrealistic toy store. The commercial subsequently received backlash online for its use of generative AI and perceived creepiness. Ars Technica noted the obvious errors produced by the AI, such as "unnatural movement, strange visual artifacts, and the irregular shape of eyeglasses."

== See also ==
- Toys "R" Us, Inc. v. Step Two, S.A
