= 19th Tony Awards =

1965 US theatrical awards ceremony

- Date: June 13, 1965
- Location: Astor Hotel; New York City, New York
- Hosted by: Tom Bosley; Jose Ferrer; Van Johnson
- Most wins: Fiddler on the Roof (9)
- Most nominations: Fiddler on the Roof (10)

Television/radio coverage
- Network: WWOR-TV

The 19th Annual Tony Awards was broadcast on June 13, 1965, from The Astor Hotel in New York City on local television station WWOR-TV (Channel 9). The Masters of Ceremonies were Tom Bosley, Jose Ferrer, and Van Johnson.

== Eligibility ==
Shows that opened on Broadway during the 1964–1965 season before May 20, 1965 are eligible.

Original plays

- Absence of a Cello
- Alfie
- All in Good Time
- The Amen Corner
- And Things That Go Bump in the Night
- Beekman Place
- Boeing-Boeing
- Catch Me If You Can
- Conversation at Midnight
- Diamond Orchid
- The Family Way
- A Girl Could Get Lucky
- Hughie
- I Was Dancing
- Incident at Vichy
- The Last Analysis
- Luv
- The Odd Couple
- One by One
- The Owl and the Pussycat
- P.S. I Love You
- Peterpat
- The Physicists
- Poor Bitos
- Poor Richard
- A Race of Hairy Men!
- Ready When You Are, C.B.!
- Roar Like a Dove
- A Severed Head
- The Sign in Sidney Brustein's Window
- Slow Dance on the Killing Ground
- The Subject was Roses
- The Sunday Man
- Tiny Alice
- Traveller Without Luggage
- The White House

Original musicals

- Bajour
- Baker Street
- Ben Franklin in Paris
- Cambridge Circus
- The Committee.
- Do I Hear a Waltz?
- Fade Out - Fade In
- Fiddler on the Roof
- Flora the Red Menace
- Folies Bergère [1964]
- Golden Boy
- Half a Sixpence
- I Had a Ball
- Kelly
- Oh, What a Lovely War!
- The Roar of the Greasepaint – The Smell of the Crowd
- Something More!
- This Was Burlesque
- Zizi

Play revivals

- The Changeling
- The Glass Menagerie
- Tartuffe
- Three Sisters

Musical revivals

- Guys and Dolls
- Wiener Blut

== The ceremony ==
Presenters: George Abbott, Alan Alda, Robert Alda, Alan Arkin, Jean-Pierre Aumont, Sidney Blackmer, Herschel Bernardi, Victor Borge, Gower Champion, Carol Channing, Barbara Cook, Farley Granger, George Grizzard, Sally Ann Howes, Anne Jeffreys, Bert Lahr, Piper Laurie, Bethel Leslie, Ethel Merman, Barry Nelson, Molly Picon, Maureen Stapleton, Jule Styne, Eli Wallach.

Performer: Lucine Amara

Music was by Meyer Davis and his Orchestra.

== Award winners and nominees ==
Winners are in bold

Best Play	Best Musical
**The Subject Was Roses – Frank Gilroy**; Luv – Murray Schisgal; The Odd Couple – Neil Simon; Tiny Alice – Edward Albee	**Fiddler on the Roof**; Golden Boy; Half a Sixpence; Oh, What a Lovely War!
Best Producer (Dramatic)	Best Producer (Musical)
**Claire Nichtern – Luv**; Hume Cronyn, Allen Hogdon Inc., Stevens Productions Inc. and Bonfils-Seawell Enterprises – Slow Dance on the Killing Ground; Theatre 1965, Richard Barr and Clinton Wilder – Tiny Alice; Robert Whitehead – Tartuffe	**Harold Prince – Fiddler on the Roof**; Allen-Hodgdon, Stevens Productions Inc. and Harold Fielding – Half a Sixpence; Hillard Elkins – Golden Boy; David Merrick – The Roar of the Greasepaint – The Smell of the Crowd
Best Performance by a Leading Actor in a Play	Best Performance by a Leading Actress in a Play
**Walter Matthau – The Odd Couple as Oscar Madison**; John Gielgud – Tiny Alice as Julian; Donald Pleasence – Poor Bitos as Bitos (Robespieere); Jason Robards – Hughie as "Erie" Smith	**Irene Worth – Tiny Alice as Miss Alice**; Marjorie Rhodes – All in Good Time as Lucy Fitton; Beah Richards – The Amen Corner as Sister Margaret Alexander; Diana Sands – The Owl and the Pussycat as Doris
Best Performance by a Leading Actor in a Musical	Best Performance by a Leading Actress in a Musical
**Zero Mostel – Fiddler on the Roof as Tevye**; Sammy Davis, Jr. – Golden Boy as Joe Wellington; Cyril Ritchard – The Roar of the Greasepaint – The Smell of the Crowd as Sir; Tommy Steele – Half a Sixpence as Arthur Kipps	**Liza Minnelli – Flora the Red Menace as Flora Mezaros**; Elizabeth Allen – Do I Hear a Waltz? as Leona Samish; Nancy Dussault – Bajour as Emily Kirsten; Inga Swenson – Baker Street as Irene Adler
Best Performance by a Supporting or Featured Actor in a Play	Best Performance by a Supporting or Featured Actress in a Play
**Jack Albertson – The Subject Was Roses as John Cleary**; Murray Hamilton – Absence of a Cello as Otis Clifton; Martin Sheen – The Subject Was Roses as Timmy Cleary; Clarence Williams III – Slow Dance on the Killing Ground as Randall	**Alice Ghostley – The Sign in Sidney Brustein's Window as Mavis Parodus Bryson**; Rae Allen – Traveller Without Luggage as Juliette; Alexandra Berlin – All in Good Time as Violet Fitton; Carolan Daniels – Slow Dance on the Killing Ground as Rosie
Best Performance by a Supporting or Featured Actor in a Musical	Best Performance by a Supporting or Featured Actress in a Musical
**Victor Spinetti – Oh, What a Lovely War! as Various Characters**; Jack Cassidy – Fade Out – Fade In as Bryon Prong; James Grout – Half a Sixpence as Chitterlow; Jerry Orbach – Guys and Dolls as Sky Masterson	**Maria Karnilova – Fiddler on the Roof as Golde**; Luba Lisa – I Had a Ball as Addie; Carrie Nye – Half a Sixpence as Helen Walsingham; Barbara Windsor – Oh, What a Lovely War! as Various Characters
Best Direction of a Play	Best Direction of a Musical
**Mike Nichols – Luv and The Odd Couple**; William Ball – Tartuffe; Ulu Grosbard – The Subject Was Roses; Alan Schneider – Tiny Alice	**Jerome Robbins – Fiddler on the Roof**; Joan Littlewood – Oh, What a Lovely War!; Anthony Newley – The Roar of the Greasepaint – The Smell of the Crowd; Gene Saks – Half a Sixpence
Best Author (Dramatic)	Best Author (Musical)
**Neil Simon – The Odd Couple**; Edward Albee – Tiny Alice; Frank Gilroy – The Subject Was Roses; Murray Schisgal – Luv	**Joseph Stein – Fiddler on the Roof**; Jerome Coopersmith – Baker Street; Beverley Cross – Half a Sixpence; Sidney Michaels – Ben Franklin in Paris
Best Original Score (Music and/or Lyrics) Written for the Theatre	Best Choreography
**Fiddler on the Roof – Jerry Bock (music) and Sheldon Harnick (lyrics)**; The Roar of the Greasepaint – The Smell of the Crowd – Anthony Newley (music) and Leslie Bricusse (lyrics); Half a Sixpence – David Heneker (music and lyrics); Do I Hear a Waltz? – Richard Rodgers (music) and Stephen Sondheim (lyrics)	**Jerome Robbins – Fiddler on the Roof**; Peter Gennaro – Bajour; Donald McKayle – Golden Boy; Onna White – Half a Sixpence
Best Scenic Design	Best Costume Design
**Oliver Smith – Baker Street, Luv and The Odd Couple**; Boris Aronson – Fiddler on the Roof and Incident at Vichy; Sean Kenny – The Roar of the Greasepaint – The Smell of the Crowd; Beni Montresor – Do I Hear a Waltz?	**Patricia Zipprodt – Fiddler on the Roof**; Jane Greenwood – Tartuffe; Motley – Baker Street; Freddy Wittop – The Roar of the Greasepaint – The Smell of the Crowd

== Special awards ==
- Gilbert Miller, for having produced 88 plays and musicals and for his perseverance which has helped to keep New York and theatre alive.
- Oliver Smith

=== Multiple nominations and awards ===
These productions had multiple nominations:

- 10 nominations: Fiddler on the Roof
- 9 nominations: Half a Sixpence
- 6 nominations: The Roar of the Greasepaint – The Smell of the Crowd and Tiny Alice
- 5 nominations: Luv, The Odd Couple and The Subject Was Roses
- 4 nominations: Baker Street, Golden Boy and Oh, What a Lovely War!
- 3 nominations: Do I Hear a Waltz?, Slow Dance on the Killing Ground and Tartuffe
- 2 nominations: All in Good Time and Bajour

The following productions received multiple awards.

- 9 wins: Fiddler on the Roof
- 4 wins: The Odd Couple
- 3 wins: Luv
- 2 wins: The Subject Was Roses

== See also ==
- 37th Academy Awards
