= Half a Sixpence (disambiguation) =

Half a Sixpence is a 1963 stage musical comedy based on Kipps, a novel by H. G. Wells.

Half a Sixpence may also refer to:

- Half a Sixpence (film), 1967 British musical film based on the musical
- Half a Sixpence (album), 1968 album by Count Basie Orchestra featuring performances of music from the film
- Half a Sixpence (2016 musical), stage musical based on the 1963 musical and Kipps
