= The Subject Was Roses =

1964 play by American playwright Frank D. Gilroy

- Original language: English
- Written by: Frank D. Gilroy
- Characters: John Cleary; Nettie Cleary; Timmy Cleary
- Genre: Drama
- Setting: the Clearys' apartment, 1946

Premiere
- Date: May 25, 1964
- Place: Royale Theatre; New York City, New York

The Subject Was Roses is a Pulitzer Prize-winning 1964 play written by Frank D. Gilroy, who also adapted the work in 1968 for a film with the same title.

== Synopsis ==
Timmy Cleary returns home from his service during World War II. While he seems to vindicate himself in his father's eyes for surviving the war, his drinking and cursing disturb his mother. Though his parents, John and Nettie, seem to be happy, the peace proves to be a façade. Soon old emotional wounds and unresolved marital problems resurface. Caught in the middle, Timmy feels responsible for their squabbling, but can see no way to resolve their problems.

== Production ==
The play premiered on Broadway at the Royale Theatre on May 25, 1964, starring Jack Albertson, Irene Dailey, and Martin Sheen, and directed by Ulu Grosbard. A major critical and commercial success, the play ran 832 performances and was nominated for five Tony Awards, winning two: Best Play and Best Featured Actor (Albertson). For his work in the play, Gilroy won the year's Pulitzer Prize for Drama. Columbia Records recorded the complete play in a recording studio with the original cast members and released it as a double-LP set.

In the published script, Gilroy included a day-by-day journal he titled, About Those Roses or How 'Not' To Do a Play and Succeed. According to the journal, "The Subject Was Roses opened on Broadway with a producer who had never produced a Broadway play; a director who had never directed one; a scenic artist who had never designed one; a general manager who had never managed one; and three actors who were virtually unknown." Additionally, the play opened after all of the award deadlines, so it was not eligible until the following year, triumphing over Neil Simon's The Odd Couple, Murray Schisgal's Luv and Edward Albee's Tiny Alice for the Tony Award, the New York Drama Critics' Circle Award and the Pulitzer Prize for Drama. During the play's two-year run, The Subject Was Roses played five different Broadway theaters and Dustin Hoffman became a replacement stage manager and understudied the role of Timmy.

In 1991, the Roundabout Theatre Company revived the play in New York City with John Mahoney, Dana Ivey and Patrick Dempsey. A 2006 revival of the play was produced by Jeffrey Finn at the Kennedy Center starring Bill Pullman, Judith Ivey, and Steve Kazee. All three performers were nominated for 2007 Helen Hayes Awards. In a 2009 revival in Los Angeles, Martin Sheen again appeared, this time in the role of the father.

== Cast and characters ==
- Irene Dailey as Nettie Cleary
- Jack Albertson as John Cleary
- Martin Sheen as Timmy Cleary

== Awards and nominations ==
Year	Award	Category	Nominee(s)	Result	Ref.
1965	Pulitzer Prize	Drama	Frank D. Gilroy	Won	
1965	Tony Awards	Best Play	Frank D. Gilroy and Edgar Lansbury	Won	
1965	Tony Awards	Best Featured Actor in a Play	Jack Albertson	Won	
1965	Tony Awards	Best Featured Actor in a Play	Martin Sheen	Nominated	
1965	Tony Awards	Best Direction of a Play	Ulu Grosbard	Nominated	
1965	Tony Awards	Best Author (Play)	Frank D. Gilroy	Nominated	
