= Tony Award for Best Author =

American theatre award for Broadway

- Awarded for: Best Author
- Location: United States New York City
- Presented by: American Theatre Wing The Broadway League
- Website: TonyAwards.com

The Tony Award for Best Author is a now retired category once presented to playwrights, authors and librettists of theatrical plays and musicals. Only nine awards were presented from 1947 to 1965, and it is often grouped with the category Best Book of a Musical.

== Winners and nominees ==
indicates the winner

=== 1940s ===
Year	Author	Production
1947; 1st Tony Awards
1947; 1st Tony Awards	Arthur Miller	All My Sons
1948; 2nd Tony Awards
1948; 2nd Tony Awards	Thomas Heggen and Joshua Logan	Mister Roberts
1949; 3rd Tony Awards
1949; 3rd Tony Awards	Arthur Miller	Death of a Salesman
1949; 3rd Tony Awards	Samuel and Bella Spewack	Kiss Me, Kate

=== 1960s ===
Year	Author	Production
1962; 16th Tony Awards
1962; 16th Tony Awards	Abe Burrows, Jack Weinstock and Willie Gilbert	How to Succeed in Business Without Really Trying
1962; 16th Tony Awards	Michael Stewart and Helen Deutsch	Carnival!
1963; 17th Tony Awards
1963; 17th Tony Awards	Burt Shevelove and Larry Gelbart	A Funny Thing Happened on the Way to the Forum
1963; 17th Tony Awards	Lionel Bart	Oliver!
1963; 17th Tony Awards	Leslie Bricusse and Anthony Newley	Stop the World – I Want to Get Off
1963; 17th Tony Awards	Neil Simon	Little Me
1964; 18th Tony Awards
1964; 18th Tony Awards	Michael Stewart	Hello, Dolly!
1964; 18th Tony Awards	Noël Coward and Harry Kurnitz	The Girl Who Came to Supper
1964; 18th Tony Awards	Timothy Gray and Hugh Martin	High Spirits
1964; 18th Tony Awards	Joe Masteroff	She Loves Me
1965; 19th Tony Awards
1965; 19th Tony Awards	Neil Simon	The Odd Couple
1965; 19th Tony Awards	Joseph Stein	Fiddler on the Roof
1965; 19th Tony Awards	Edward Albee	Tiny Alice
1965; 19th Tony Awards	Jerome Coopersmith	Baker Street
1965; 19th Tony Awards	Beverley Cross	Half a Sixpence
1965; 19th Tony Awards	Frank D. Gilroy	The Subject Was Roses
1965; 19th Tony Awards	Sidney Michaels	Ben Franklin in Paris
1965; 19th Tony Awards	Murray Schisgal	Luv

== See also ==
- Drama Desk Award for Outstanding Book of a Musical
- Tony Award for Best Book of a Musical
