= 2017 WhatsOnStage Awards =

British theatre awards

The WhatsOnStage Awards, founded in 2001 as the Theatregoers' Choice Awards, are a fan-driven set of awards organised by the theatre website WhatsOnStage.com, based on a popular vote recognising performers and productions of English theatre, with an emphasis on London's West End theatre.

The 2017 Whatsonstage Award winners and nominees were:

Best New Play	Best New Musical
Harry Potter and the Cursed Child; The Comedy About a Bank Robbery; The Flick; The Intelligent Homosexual's Guide to Capitalism and Socialism with a Key to the Scriptures or iHo; The Mother	School of Rock; Aladdin; Dreamgirls; Groundhog Day; Half a Sixpence
Best Play Revival	Best Musical Revival
No Man's Land; The Boys in the Band (play); The Deep Blue Sea (play); The Dresser; Travesties	Funny Girl; Jesus Christ Superstar; Ragtime; Show Boat; Sunset Boulevard
Best Actor in a Play	Best Actress in a Play
Jamie Parker for Harry Potter and the Cursed Child; Kenneth Branagh for The Entertainer; Ralph Fiennes for Richard III; Ian Hallard for The Boys in the Band; Ian McKellen for No Man's Land	Billie Piper for Yerma; Lily James for Romeo and Juliet; Pixie Lott for Breakfast at Tiffany's; Helen McCrory for The Deep Blue Sea; Michelle Terry for Henry V
Best Actor in a Musical	Best Actress in a Musical
Charlie Stemp for Half a Sixpence; Michael C. Hall for Lazarus; Ramin Karimloo for Murder Ballad; Andy Karl for Groundhog Day; Michael Xavier for Sunset Boulevard	Amber Riley for Dreamgirls; Glenn Close for Sunset Boulevard; Carrie Hope Fletcher for Chitty Chitty Bang Bang; Devon-Elise Johnson for Half a Sixpence; Sheridan Smith for Funny Girl
Best Supporting Actor in a Play	Best Supporting Actress in a Play
Anthony Boyle for Harry Potter and the Cursed Child; Freddie Fox for Travesties; Derek Jacobi for Romeo and Juliet; Jonjo O'Neill for Unreachable; Paul Thornley for Harry Potter and the Cursed Child	Noma Dumezweni for Harry Potter and the Cursed Child; Poppy Miller for Harry Potter and the Cursed Child; Vanessa Redgrave for Richard III; Jenna Russell for Doctor Faustus; Meera Syal for Romeo and Juliet
Best Supporting Actor in a Musical	Best Supporting Actress in a Musical
Trevor Dion Nicholas for Aladdin; Ian Bartholomew for Half a Sixpence; Adam J. Bernard for Dreamgirls; Tyrone Huntley for Jesus Christ Superstar; Joel Montague for Funny Girl	Emma Williams for Half a Sixpence; Sophia Anne Caruso for Lazarus; Victoria Hamilton-Barritt for Murder Ballad; Amy Lennox for Lazarus; Rebecca Trehearn for Show Boat
Best Direction	Best Choreography
John Tiffany for Harry Potter and the Cursed Child; Rachel Kavanaugh for Half a Sixpence; Michael Mayer for Funny Girl; Casey Nicholaw for Aladdin; Matthew Warchus for Groundhog Day	Andrew Wright for Half a Sixpence; Peter Darling and Ellen Kane for Groundhog Day; Drew McOnie for Jesus Christ Superstar; Casey Nicholaw for Aladdin; Casey Nicholaw for Dreamgirls
Best Set Design	Best Costume Design
Christine Jones for Harry Potter and the Cursed Child; Lez Brotherston for Show Boat; Miriam Buether for Wild; Bob Crowley for Aladdin; Rob Howell for Groundhog Day	Gregg Barnes for Aladdin; Gregg Barnes for Dreamgirls; Paul Brown for Half a Sixpence; Katrina Lindsay for Harry Potter and the Cursed Child; Matthew Wright for Funny Girl
Best Lighting Design	Best Video Design
Neil Austin for Harry Potter and the Cursed Child; Charlie Morgan Jones for Little Shop of Horrors; Natasha Katz for Aladdin; Hugh Vanstone for Groundhog Day; Jack Weir for The Boys in the Band	Finn Ross and Ash Woodward for Harry Potter and the Cursed Child; Andrzej Goulding for Groundhog Day; Laura Perrett for Murder Ballad; Finn Ross for The Tempest; Tal Yarden for Lazarus
Best Off-West End Production	Best Regional Production
The Last Five Years; The Boys in the Band; Grey Gardens; Ragtime; Side Show	The Girls; Chitty Chitty Bang Bang (musical); Flowers for Mrs. Harris; The Grinning Man; Rent
Best West End Show
Les Misérables & Wicked; Kinky Boots; Matilda; The Phantom of the Opera
Equity Award for Services to Theatre Society Special Award
Cameron Mackintosh
