= Charlie Stemp =

English actor (born 1993)

- Born: 30 November 1993 (age 32); Peckham, London
- Occupation: Actor
- Years active: 2013-present
- Known for: Half a Sixpence (2016-2017); Hello, Dolly! (2018); Mary Poppins (2019-2022)
- Awards: WhatsOnStage Award for Best Actor in a Musical (2017); Theatre World Award (2018)

Charles Joe Stemp (born 30 November 1993) is an English actor. Stemp came to prominence for his leading role as Arthur Kipps in the West End musical Half a Sixpence, which earned him a WhatsOnStage Award for Best Actor in a Musical and nomination for a 2017 Laurence Olivier Award for Best Actor in a Leading Role in a Musical.

== Early life and education ==
Stemp was born in Peckham and raised in Bexley, London. He attended the Belcanto London Academy Theatre School, and trained for three years at Laine Theatre Arts in Epsom. He is also a keen football and rugby player.

== Acting career ==
After graduating, Stemp performed in Wicked in London's West End and was cast as Eddie in the international tour of the musical Mamma Mia!. Stemp also appeared in the film Knarcolepsy.

Stemp appeared as the lead actor in Sir Cameron Mackintosh’s production of Half a Sixpence, written by Julian Fellowes. He first performed the role at Chichester Festival Theatre from July to September 2016. In October 2016, the musical transferred to the Noël Coward Theatre in the West End, and extended its booking to 2 September 2017. For this role, Stemp won the WhatsOnStage Award for Best Actor in a Leading Role in a Musical and was nominated for the 2017 Laurence Olivier Award for Best Actor in a Leading Role in a Musical. In 2021, Fellowes rewrote the piece under the title Kipps (after the lead character Artie Kipps) and it was filmed for Sky Arts, with Stemp again in the title role.

Stemp appeared on Broadway in the revival of Hello, Dolly!, starting on 20 January 2018, officially on 22 February 2018, as Barnaby Tucker. He took over the role originally played by Taylor Trensch. This marked his Broadway debut. The show closed on 25 August 2018.

Stemp played the role of Bert in a West End revival of Mary Poppins opposite Zizi Strallen in the title role, at the Prince Edward Theatre. As one reviewer remarked, "Bert pulls off the impossible – tap-dancing upside down from one end of the proscenium arch to the other."

In 2022, Stemp was cast as Bobby Child in the Chichester Festival Theatre's production of Crazy for You which transferred to the Gillian Lynne Theatre in 2023. Stemp performed at the Royal Variety show in 2023.

Stemp starred as Bill Calhoun in the West End revival of Kiss Me, Kate at the Barbican Centre, opposite Stephanie J. Block and Adrian Dunbar. The production ran from 4 June to 14 September 2024.

Charlie Stemp portrayed Alan-a-Dale in the London Palladium's 2024–2025 annual holiday pantomime production of "Robin Hood." The show ran from 7 December 2024, to 12 January 2025, and featured a star-studded cast, including Julian Clary as Robin Hood, Jane McDonald as Maid Marion, Marisha Wallace as the Sheriff of Nottingham, Nigel Havers as Friar Tuck, Paul Zerdin as Will Scarlet, Rob Madge as the Spirit of Sherwood, and Tosh Wanogho-Maud as Little John.

The production received positive reviews, with particular praise for its humor, extravagant costumes, and lively performances. One review highlighted Clary's comedic timing and Stemp's song-and-dance skills, noting that the show offered "great dances" and showcased Stemp as a "song and dance man of the old school."

== Theatre Credits ==
Year	Production	Role	Venue	Notes
2013–14	Wicked	Ensemble	Apollo Victoria Theatre	West End
2015	Mamma Mia!	Eddie	Various	International Tour
2016	Half a Sixpence	Arthur Kipps	Chichester Festival Theatre	Regional
2016–17	Half a Sixpence	Arthur Kipps	Noël Coward Theatre	West End
2017–18	Dick Whittington	Dick Whittington	London Palladium	West End
2018	Hello, Dolly!	Barnaby Tucker	Shubert Theatre	Broadway
2018–19	Snow White	Prince Harry of Hampstead	London Palladium	West End
2019	Rough Crossing	Dvornichek	Various	UK Tour
2019–23	Mary Poppins	Bert	Prince Edward Theatre	West End
2020	Pantoland	Ensemble	London Palladium	West End
2022	Crazy for You	Bobby Child	Chichester Festival Theatre	Regional
2023	Crazy for You	Bobby Child	Gillian Lynne Theatre	West End
2024	Kiss Me Kate	Bill Calhoun/Lucentio	Barbican Centre	London
2024–25	Robin Hood	Alan-A-Dale	London Palladium	West End
2025	Dracula, A Comedy of Terrors	Jonathan Harker	Menier Chocolate Factory	London
2025–26	Cinderella	Buttons	Richmond Theatre	London

== Accolades ==
Year	Award	Category	Work	Result	Ref
2016	UK Theatre Award	Best Performance in a Musical	Half a Sixpence	Nominated	
2017	Laurence Olivier Award	Best Actor in a Leading Role in a Musical	Half a Sixpence	Nominated	
2017	WhatsOnStage Award	Best Actor in a Musical	Half a Sixpence	Won	
2018	Theatre World Award	Outstanding Broadway Debut	Hello, Dolly!	Honoree	
2020	Laurence Olivier Award	Best Actor in a Leading Role in a Musical	Mary Poppins	Nominated	
2023	Evening Standard Theatre Award	Best Musical Performance	Crazy for You	Nominated	
2024	Laurence Olivier Award	Best Actor in a Musical	Crazy for You	Nominated	

== See also ==
- List of British actors
