= An American Christmas Carol =

1979 film directed by Eric Till

- Blu-ray Disc cover
- Genre: Drama; Fantasy
- Based on: A Christmas Carol by Charles Dickens
- Screenplay by: Jerome Coopersmith
- Directed by: Eric Till
- Starring: Henry Winkler; Dorian Harewood; Susan Hogan; Cec Linder; R.H. Thomson; David Wayne; Michael Wincott; William Bermender; Brett Matthew Davidson
- Music by: Hagood Hardy
- Country of origin: United States
- Original language: English

Production
- Executive producers: Edgar J. Scherick; Gary Smith
- Producers: Stanley Chase; Jon Slan
- Production locations: Elora, Ontario; Toronto
- Cinematography: Richard Ciupka
- Editor: Ron Wisman
- Running time: 97 minutes
- Production companies: Smith-Hemion Productions; Stanley Chase Productions

Original release
- Network: ABC
- Release: December 16, 1979

An American Christmas Carol is a 1979 American made-for-television fantasy drama film directed by Eric Till and loosely based on Charles Dickens' 1843 novella A Christmas Carol. It first aired December 16, 1979 on ABC.

== Plot ==
In Depression-era Concord, New Hampshire, a miserly businessman named Benedict Slade receives a long-overdue change in outlook one Christmas Eve when he is visited by three ghostly figures who resemble three of the people whose possessions Slade had seized to collect on unpaid loans. Assuming the roles of the Ghosts of Christmas Past, Present, and Future from Charles Dickens' classic story, the three apparitions force Slade to face the consequences of his skinflint ways, and he becomes a caring, generous, and more amiable man.

On Christmas Eve of 1933, Thatcher, Slade's clerk, and his other employees assist him on confiscating the possessions of debtors who cannot repay him. While collecting debts, Slade encounters three of his debtors - a farmer named Matt Reeves, a manager of the local orphanage named Jessup, and a book dealer named Merrivale - and denies their requests to have more time to repay him, and confiscates their possessions, much to their dismay.

That afternoon, back in the company warehouse, Slade is taking apart some of Merrivale's leather-bound books that he confiscated that day, which he intends to sell for the value of the leather in their binding, one of which is an original copy of "A Christmas Carol" signed by Charles Dickens. When Thatcher refuses to help Slade with this and tries to explain why he is not helping his employer in this task, Slade falsely says that Thatcher "disagrees with everything he does... conspires with others to pull money out of him..." and fires Thatcher, much to his family's dismay.

That evening, the power in Slade's warehouse goes out, and some of the repossessed items in the warehouse start making noise of their own accord. When Slade looks through the warehouse to investigate this, he is haunted by the spirit of Jack Latham - his former business partner and the original owner of the warehouse, who had died some time before. The ghost of Latham warns Slade of the mistakes he made in his life, and the terrible fate in Hell that he currently suffers, which Slade will suffer if he does not change. Latham tells Slade to expect three ghosts before the night is over, who will try to help Slade to turn his life around and avoid the same fate as Latham.

That night, Slade meets the first ghost, who bears the appearance of Merrivale, from whom Slade had confiscated the books that he was taking apart earlier that day. Merrivale shows Slade many events from his past, including his apprenticeship in woodwork with a man named Mr. Brewster, and his courtship with Brewster's daughter Helen. An increasingly ambitious Slade tried to make a Christmas present of an assembly line chair as a proposition for the factory, but traditionalist Brewster turned Slade down. Slade later accepted a traveling position to earn for him and Helen's future, to her dismay. When he returned, there was disconnect between Slade and the Brewsters from the years passed, as Slade met Latham. Their separation was sealed when Brewster's factory burned down from a lit cigar from an overtime worker inside, and Latham was approached by an ailing Brewster for rebuilding funds, as his insurance had lapsed. In a meeting with Latham, Slade deemed Brewster's restructuring doomed to fail, and secured Latham's funding for strict acquisition loans. Finally, Slade sees Helen silently spurning him at Mr. Brewster's funeral, as he protests that he never wanted to hurt them.

Slade awakes in his chambers, but hears choral music coming from his warehouse. He enters it to investigate what is happening, where he meets the second ghost, who takes the form of Jessup, who is accompanied by a large crowd of carol-singing children. Jessup shows Slade visions of the present Christmas, including the festivities of Helen, who is now happily married and has a daughter, and Thatcher's family, who are saddened by the event of Thatcher losing his job. Slade notices that, to his dismay, Thatcher's son Jonathan is disabled and uses a pair of crutches to get around. Jessup warns Slade that Jonathan will die if the future remains unchanged.

Slade awakens back in his chambers, where he meets the third ghost, who bears the appearance of Matt Reeves. Reeves takes Slade to a possible future Christmas, where Jonathan, Thatcher's son, dies and the Thatchers mourn his passing. Slade's own belongings are then sold in an auction and then burned outside his house following his future death, which is celebrated by the townsfolk. Slade promises to change if he is returned to the present, which he is.

Awakening in his chambers on the early morning of Christmas Day, Slade returns all the repossessed items back to the debtors he took them from, and gives presents to Merrivale, Jessup and Reeves - who are the three Ghosts in their real-life forms. When returning the repaired books to Merrivale, he also gives back the old copy of "A Christmas Carol", which has been put back together and gift-wrapped. He also gives presents and a large Christmas turkey to the Thatchers, and offers tickets to an Australian clinic to Jonathan, Thatcher's son, who Slade promises to help as much as he can. When visiting Jessup's orphanage, Slade finds a bitter orphan like he himself was, and adopts the orphan as his ward and apprentice in wood-carving.

== Cast ==
- Henry Winkler as Benedict Slade
- Dorian Harewood as Matt Reeves / Debtor of Christmas Future
- Susan Hogan as Helen Brewster
- Cec Linder as Auctioneer
- R.H. Thomson as Thatcher
- David Wayne as Merrivale / Debtor of Christmas Past
- Michael Wincott as Choir Leader
- William Bermender as Orphan
- Brett Matthew Davidson as Orphan
- Tammy Bourne as Sarah Thatcher
- Chris Cragg as Jonathan Thatcher
- James B. Douglas as Sam Perkins
- Arlene Duncan as Jennie Reeves
- Linda Goranson as Mrs. Doris Thatcher
- Gerard Parkes as Jessup / Debtor of Christmas Present
- Mary Pirie as Mrs. Brewster
- Ken Pogue (as Kenneth Pogue) as Jack Latham
- Sammy Snyders as Young Slade
- Chris Wiggins as Mr. Brewster
- Alexander Galant as Orphan (uncredited)

Darren Difonzo as Orphan

== Production ==
The film was shot on location in and around the historic town of Elora, Ontario with additional outdoor scenes and interior sound stage filming in Toronto, Ontario, Canada. The film's opening panoramic shot is along Elora's Mill St. ending with a view of the famous Elora Mill in the distance. Most of the film's hired actors and crew were Canadian.

Academy Award-winning special make-up effects artist Rick Baker served as consultant for the aging makeup for star Henry Winkler.

== Home media ==
An American Christmas Carol was released on DVD on November 23, 1999. It was released on Blu-ray in December 2012.

== See also ==
- List of Christmas films
- List of ghost films
- Adaptations of A Christmas Carol
