= Johnny Jupiter =

American television series, 1953 and 1954

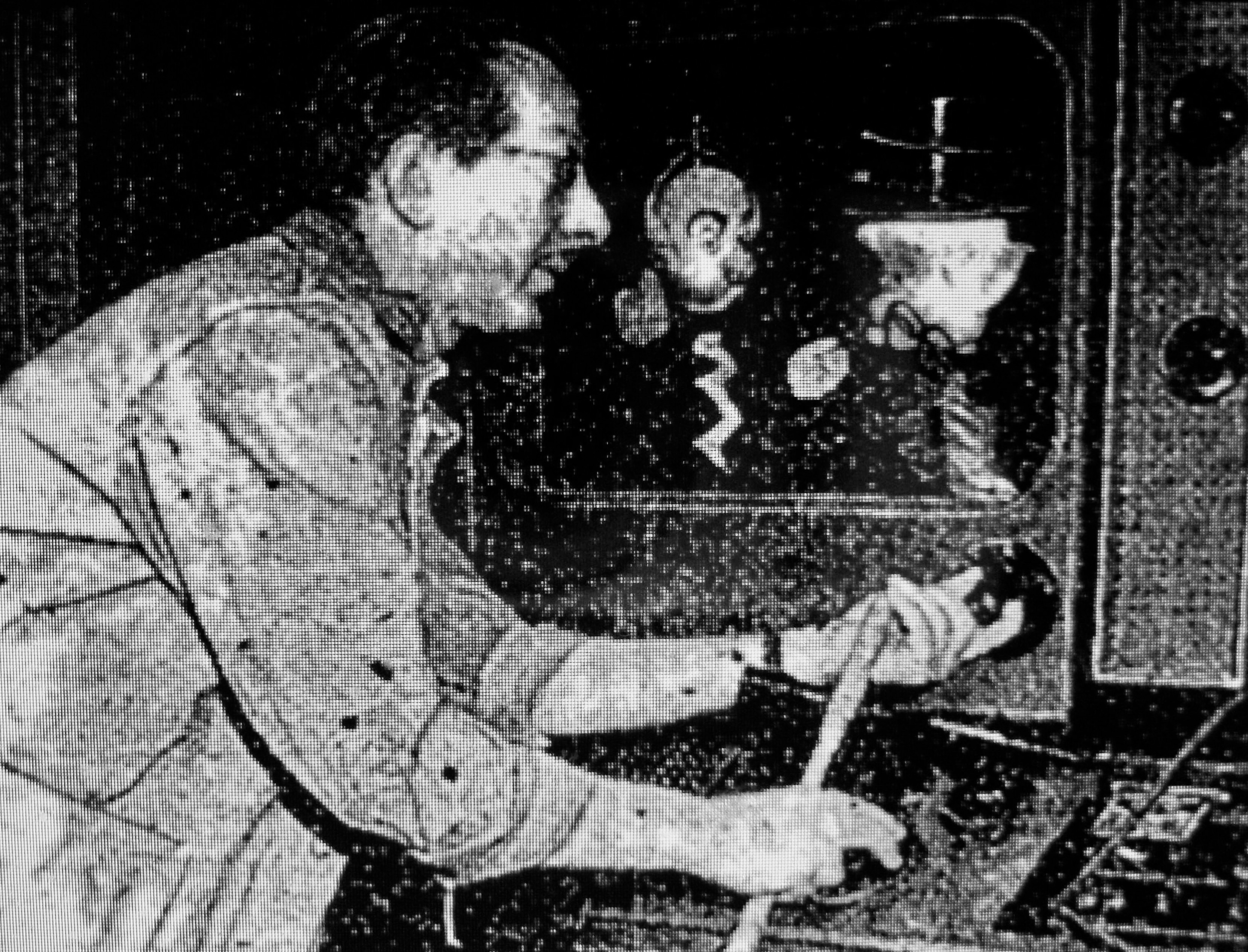
- DuMont publicity shot
- Genre: Children's
- Created by: Martin Stone
- Written by: Horton Foote; Jerome Coopersmith
- Starring: Vaughn Taylor; Cliff Hall; Pat Peardon; Wright King
- Voices of: Carl Harms
- Country of origin: United States
- Original language: English
- No. of seasons: 1

Production
- Production locations: New York City, New York, U.S.
- Camera setup: Multi-camera
- Running time: 24 mins.

Original release
- Network: DuMont Television Network
- Release: March 21 – June 13, 1953

Johnny Jupiter is the name of two early American television programs featuring a combination of live action and hand puppets. The first version aired on the DuMont Television Network from March to June 1953. The second version aired on ABC from September 1953 to May 1954.

== DuMont version ==
The original version, broadcast live on the DuMont Television Network Saturday evenings for 30 minutes, from March 21 to June 13, 1953, starred Vaughn Taylor as an elderly janitor, Ernest P. Duckweather, cleaning-up after midnight in a TV studio. Tinkering with a TV set, he somehow made contact with the planet Jupiter, and two of its inhabitants, Johnny Jupiter and his colleague B-12, both of whom were hand puppets voiced by series writer Jerome Coopersmith and Carl Harms. The often sharp humor of the series was based on Duckweather trying to explain and justify earth customs to the natives of Jupiter, who could view them on their own TV sets.

As an example, the program covered the US fad for 3D movies, which came and went rapidly in 1953. The Jovian natives explain that their own movies were originally in 3D but rapidly evolved to 7-D before dropping to 1-D, which is the format all Jovians prefer today.

=== Episode status ===
Very few kinescopes of the DuMont version of Johnny Jupiter have survived.

== ABC version ==
Johnny Jupiter
- Genre: Science fiction
- Starring: Wright King
- Voices of: Gil Mack
- Country of origin: United States
- Original language: English

Production
- Producer: Jerome Coopersmith
- Camera setup: Single-camera
- Running time: 25 mins.

Original release
- Network: ABC
- Release: September 5, 1953 – May 29, 1954

Another weekly 30-minute version of the series, filmed and sponsored by M&M's Candies, appeared on ABC from September 5, 1953, to May 29, 1954. The concept was completely different from the DuMont version of the series. Wright King, as Duckweather, was now an eager young employee of a TV repair shop; most of each episode consisted of live-action situation comedy involving Duckweather, his boss Horatio Frisby, the boss's daughter Katherine, and one or more guest-stars.

The puppets appeared only when Duckweather needed help or advice; the magic TV set now brought in three Jovian hand puppets: Johnny Jupiter; a cube-headed robot, Major Domo; and a cylinder-headed, glasses-wearing Reject the Robot, all voiced by Gil Mack. On at least one episode Reject's brother Defect appeared (Except for Johnny, the natives of Jupiter were apparently now all robots). The solution to Duckweather's problem generally involved beaming the bumbling Reject to earth, where he was played by new puppeteer Gene (aka Phil) London wearing a large prop robot suit.

Apart from the robot suit, the new series was not geared towards children. The series was canceled after one 39-episode season. In this second series, Jerry Coopersmith was producer and script editor only.

=== Episode status ===
Copies of the ABC version of the program have survived and have been released on DVD.

== See also ==
- List of programs broadcast by the DuMont Television Network
- List of surviving DuMont Television Network broadcasts

== Bibliography ==
- David Weinstein, The Forgotten Network: DuMont and the Birth of American Television (Philadelphia: Temple University Press, 2004) ISBN 1-59213-245-6
- Alex McNeil, Total Television, Fourth edition (New York: Penguin Books, 1980) ISBN 0-14-024916-8
- Tim Brooks and Earle Marsh, The Complete Directory to Prime Time Network TV Shows, Third edition (New York: Ballantine Books, 1964) ISBN 0-345-31864-1
