= All in Good Time (play) =

Ad for the Broadway production, at the Royale Theatre

All in Good Time is a comic play by Bill Naughton based on his 1961 Armchair Theatre television play "Honeymoon Postponed". Originally produced at the Mermaid Theatre in 1963 in London, it subsequently transferred to the Phoenix Theatre, and then to Broadway, where it ran for 44 performances in February and March 1965. The Broadway cast included Donald Wolfit, Marjorie Rhodes and Richard Dysart. It received Tony Award Best Actress and Best Featured Actress nominations for Marjorie Rhodes and Alexandra Berlin.

== Plot ==
Teenage newlyweds living with the groom's parents, have difficulties consummating their marriage.

== Original production ==
The play, directed by Josephine Wilson, opened on 6 March 1963 at Bernard Miles' Mermaid Theatre, London, before transferring to the Phoenix Theatre in the West End.

- Arthur Fitton - John Pickles
- Eddie Taylor - Laurie Asprey
- Ezra Fitton - Bernard Miles
- Geoffrey Fitton - Edward Petherbridge
- Joe Thompson - Peter Welch
- Leslie Piper - Donald Eccles
- Liz Piper - Maureen Pryor
- Lucy Fitton - Marjorie Rhodes
- Molly Thompson - Mary Quinn
- Uncle Fred - John McKelvey
- Violet Fitton - Lois Daine

== Original Broadway production ==
The play, directed by Donald McWhinnie, opened at the Royale Theatre, New York, on 18 February 1965 and closed on 27 March 1965.

- Violet Fitton - Alexandra Berlin
- Liz Piper - Hazel Douglas
- Uncle Fred - Richard A. Dysart
- Geoffrey Fitton - John Karlen
- Eddie Taylor - Terry Lomax
- Arthur Fitton - Brian Murray
- Lucy Fitton - Marjorie Rhodes
- Joe Thompson - Eugene Roche
- Rosalind Ross - Molly Thompson
- Leslie Piper - John Sharp
- Ezra Fitton - Donald Wolfit

== Adaptations ==
The play was adapted for the 1966 film The Family Way.

All in Good Time (2011) shares much of the plot of The Family Way but it features a Hindu couple, and their planned honeymoon destination is Goa, not Majorca.
