= Half a Sixpence (film) =

1967 British film by George Sidney

- Original American poster
- Directed by: George Sidney
- Written by: Beverley Cross; Dorothy Kingsley
- Based on: Kipps: The Story of a Simple Soul by H. G. Wells
- Produced by: Charles H. Schneer; George Sidney
- Starring: Tommy Steele; Julia Foster; Cyril Ritchard
- Cinematography: Geoffrey Unsworth
- Edited by: Bill Lewthwaite; Frank Santillo
- Music by: David Heneker
- Production company: Ameran Films
- Distributed by: Paramount British Pictures
- Release date: 21 December 1967
- Running time: 143 minutes
- Country: United Kingdom
- Language: English
- Budget: $6 million

Half a Sixpence is a 1967 British musical film directed by George Sidney starring Tommy Steele, Julia Foster and Cyril Ritchard. It was choreographed by Gillian Lynne. The screenplay by Beverley Cross is adapted from his book for the 1963 stage musical of the same name, which was based on Kipps: The Story of a Simple Soul, the 1905 novel by H. G. Wells. The music and lyrics are by David Heneker.

This was the final film made by Sidney, and also the last film appearance of actor Hilton Edwards.

== Plot ==
In Victorian England, a young orphan, Arthur Kipps ("Artie"), finds a sixpence as he walks along a river with his young friend, Ann. Artie is then sent to a nearby town, where he is to serve as apprentice to a draper.

Several years later he meets up with Ann once again, and with the coin cut into two he gives one half to Ann as a symbol of their love.

Artie grows up into a young man. Work at the draper's store is difficult. He becomes friends with Harry Chitterlow, an actor-playwright, who discovers that Artie is heir to a fortune left him by his grandfather. Artie becomes wealthy as a result of the inheritance, and invests in one of Chitterlow's shows. He breaks up with Ann, who has become a maid, and becomes engaged to the wealthy upper class Helen Walsingham. Kipps gets Helen's brother Hubert to invest his money.

Artie sees Ann mistreated by the upper class at a dinner and ends his relationship with Helen. He marries Ann and plans to build a mansion. Ann becomes unhappy with Artie's grandiose ambitions. Hubert absconds with Artie's money leaving him broke.

Artie and Ann reunite and prepare happily to live in a modest cottage. Then Chitterlow reappears with news that his play is a success and that Artie will earn some of the profits.

== Cast ==
- Tommy Steele as Arthur "Artie" Kipps
- Julia Foster as Ann
- Cyril Ritchard as Harry Chitterlow
- Penelope Horner as Helen
- Elaine Taylor as Victoria
- Grover Dale as Pearce
- Hilton Edwards as Shalford
- Julia Sutton as Flo
- Leslie Meadows as Buggins
- Sheila Falconer as Kate
- Pamela Brown as Mrs Walsingham
- James Villiers as Hubert
- Christopher Sandford as Sid
- Aleta Morrison as Laura
- Jean Anderson as Lady Botting
- Allan Cuthbertson as Wilkins
- Bartlett Mullins as Carshott
- James Bolam as Mr. Jones
- Geoffrey Chandler as Young Arthur "Artie" Kipps

== Development ==
The musical was seen by producer Charles H. Schneer who loved it and acquired the rights. He sold these to Paramount. In November 1965, Paramount bought the screen rights for $250,000 plus a percentage of the profits. They also hired Steele to repeat his stage performance.

In June 1966, George Sidney signed to direct. Steele signed a three-picture deal with Paramount.

Steele said: "if this hits I'll carry on the burden of starring in musicals in widescreen and in colour. If not I'll retreat to the backwoods and do what I'd as soon do, just quietly act."

Schneer said: "Unfortunately, just as we began to shoot, Paramount was sold to Gulf & Western. Half a Sixpence should have been a small and intimate picture. It turned out to be anything but that. The director and the star ran away with it, and I was virtually out of the picture. I was very unhappy about the whole situation."

== Production ==
Filming started 13 September 1966 in England. It was meant to take four months but went over schedule.

Location scenes include Aylesford, Kent; The Pantiles in Royal Tunbridge Wells, Kent; Eastbourne, East Sussex; Blenheim Palace, Oxfordshire; Oakley Court, Berkshire; Devil's Bridge, Ceredigion; and Ockham, Surrey. Interiors were filmed at Shepperton Studios, Surrey.

Sidney later recalled making the film was "quite an experience because they'd never made a musical film in England" for a number of years. "They'd never worked with playback in England, and when I went there they didn't have a music cutter. So I had to bring some people in... It wasn't fast working in England, not by a long shot. But I must say that I enjoyed it."

According to one report, the budget was originally $2.5 million, then increased to $3.3 million.

== Songs ==
- "All in the Cause of Economy," performed by Artie, Pearce, and Apprentices
- "Half a Sixpence," performed by Artie and Ann
- "Money to Burn," performed by Artie, Harry, Laura, and Chorus
- "I Don't Believe A Word of It"/"I'm Not Talking to You," performed by Ann and Friends, Artie, Pearce, and Apprentices
- "A Proper Gentleman," performed by Chorus
- "She's Too Far Above Me," performed by Artie
- "If the Rain's Got to Fall," performed by Artie, Children, and Chorus
- "Lady Botting's Boating Regatta Cup Racing Song" (by David Heneker and Irwin Kostal), performed by Artie and Chorus
- "Flash, Bang, Wallop!," performed by Artie, Pearce, and Chorus
- "I Know What I Am," performed by Ann
- "This Is My World" (by Heneker and Kostal), performed by Artie
- Finale: "Half a Sixpence" (reprise)/"Flash, Bang, Wallop" (reprise), performed by Artie, Ann and Chorus

Julia Foster's vocal double was Marti Webb, who played Ann in the original 1963 London production (and who appears on the London Cast album).

== Critical reception ==
Half a Sixpence (Soundtrack LP)

In her review in The New York Times, Renata Adler said the film "should be visually fascinating to anyone in a state that I think is best described as stoned. The movie is flamboyantly colourful [and] wildly active: hardly anyone holds still for a single line, and the characters – in the ancient tradition of musicals – live on the verge of bursting into improbable song. The songs themselves, trite, gay, and thoroughly meaningless, make absolutely no concession to anything that was happened in popular music in the last 10 years ... some of it is quite beautiful to watch.... it is nice to have a musical photographed not on a sound stage, but in outdoor England ... but most of the time one wonders where anyone found the energy to put on this long, empty, frenetic extravaganza ... I cannot imagine that there will be many more musicals that are so lavishly, exuberantly out of touch with the world of rock and the music of our time."

Kathleen Carroll of the New York Daily News that "for all Gillian Lynne's high-stepping choreography, the film is about as light and as graceful on its feet as an elephant. Only one sequence moves at a rate approximating speed. It is the gay Henley regatta, with Kipps crewing for the Ascot set, slicing the Thames in a racing shell. One longs for the simplicity of the original, when the story, although hardly novel, at least held its own, and when the music, although hardly memorable, was not drummed up into interminable, brassy music hall routines."

Charles Champlin of the Los Angeles Times remarked that "Half a Sixpence at Grauman's Chinese Theatre is, almost uniquely these days, a picture of innocence (or, if you will, simple-mindedness) and for all its flaws there are those who will respond gratefully to this excursion into the primer-story past. My regret is that the machineries of film-making have rendered the lighter-than-air as heavy as lead and have surrendered innocence to technical sophistication. Tommy Steele is a wonder and he gives a dazzling, perfected performance. Yet even his ingratiating charm cannot quite conceal the hard, slow work the film was. Half a Sixpence is better than none, but it has been devalued."

Roger Ebert of the Chicago Sun-Times felt that "Tommy Steele is just the performer for this sort of schmaltz. He is, in fact, a very good song-and-dance man, the only member of his generation who bears comparison with Gene Kelly and Dan Dailey ... [George Sidney's] timing tends to lag, his sight gags telegraph ahead, and his songs drag."

Clifford Terry of the Chicago Tribune opined:

American audiences are beginning to get the idea that if you've seen one Tommy Steele movie, you've seen them both. Britishers have been afforded chances to view such products as "The Tommy Steele Story" and "Tommy the Toreador," but we colonists had to restrain ourselves until "The Happiest Millionaire" and, now, Half a Sixpence, an agonizing experience which shows the latest impact of devaluation. Perhaps the proceedings weren't so bankrupt of charm and originality when Steele played the Arthur Kipps role on the London and Broadway stage for four years, safely out of range of the cinematic close-ups which put into Panavision perspective that personified-balloon face and set of teeth that would make Cass Daley completely Crestfallen. Of course he can't control his physiognomy, but he could do something about his general deportment, in which he matches Sandy Dennis in the mannerisms department by strutting and prancing, rolling his eyes, tossing his head, and twitching around so much he looks like a third base coach with a bad case of the shingles. Whereas the play was based on H. G. Wells' novel, "Kipps," its successor engenders excitement more in keeping with a screen adaptation of the Keynesian theory. The cornerstone of any good musical, one would assume, is the score, but David Heneker's songs are so incredibly and unanimously nondescript that the wedding reception sequence could be interchanged with the "Happiest Millionaire" barroom number with no one the wiser.

Pauline Kael described the film as "appalling" and "technically astonishing."

Variety said, "The cohesive force is certainly that of Tommy Steele, who takes hold of his part like a terrier and never lets go. His assurance is overwhelming, and he leads the terping with splendid vigor and elan."

Channel 4 calls it "undeniably colourful and annoyingly energetic" and adds, "there is plenty of flash, bang and wallop, but very little warmth or soul, the hapless star attempting to carry the film by grinning goonishly throughout. He exudes as much charm as the deckchair he disguises himself as."

Time Out London says, "the film lays on the period charm rather exhaustingly, and the songs ... don't exactly sweep you along."

== Box office ==
The movie was the 13th most popular at the UK box office in 1969. Sidney says the film was "a real smash" in England but "did less than nothing" in the US "because it was an English picture. The film didn't have anyone in it that anyone in this country knew. Unfortunately Tommy Steele had just made two very bad pictures in this country. We followed those and had nothing to build on with him." Sidney also felt the film's financial prospects were hurt by the popularity of Beatlemania. "That brought in a whole new sound," he said. "Maybe if we had been two or three years earlier with the picture, it might have been more successful with American audiences."

== Awards and nominations ==
The film was nominated for the BAFTA Award for Best Costume Design - Colour.

== See also ==
- Half a Sixpence for the album by pianist and bandleader Count Basie and His Orchestra featuring performances of music from the motion picture Half a Sixpence recorded in 1967 and released on the Dot label.
