= Luv (play) =

1965 stage play by Murray Schisgal

- Original language: English
- Written by: Murray Schisgal
- Genre: Comedy
- Setting: New York City

Premiere
- Date: November 11, 1964
- Place: United States

Luv is a play by Murray Schisgal. The production originated on Broadway in 1964. The production was directed by Mike Nichols and featured performances from Alan Arkin, Eli Wallach, and Anne Jackson.

It received five Tony Award nominations including for Best Play. It won three Tonys for Best Producer of a Play, Best Direction of a Play and Best Scenic Design.

== Summary ==
A mix of absurdist humor and traditional Broadway comedy in the Neil Simon vein, Luv concerns two college friends—misfit Harry and materialistic Milt—who are reunited when the latter stops the former from jumping off a bridge, the play's setting. Each discovers the other is equally miserable as they share hard-luck stories. Milt sees in Harry an answer to his primary problem—his wife Ellen, whom he tries to foist on his old pal so he can run off with his mistress.

== Production ==
After twenty-eight previews, the Broadway production, directed by Mike Nichols, opened on November 11, 1964, at the Booth Theatre. It transferred to the Broadhurst and then the now-demolished Helen Hayes before completing its run of 901 performances. It won the Tony Award for Best Director, Best Producer (Claire Nichtern) and Best Scenic Design (Oliver Smith).

== Cast ==
Alan Arkin, Eli Wallach, and Anne Jackson comprised the original cast. Barbara Bel Geddes, Larry Blyden, Gene Wilder, and Gabriel Dell were among the replacement performers later in the run.

The three original cast members appeared as the "Mystery Guest" on the CBS-TV Panel show What's My Line on March 14, 1965.

== Film adaptation ==
The 1967 film version, directed by Clive Donner and starring Jack Lemmon, Peter Falk, and Elaine May, added various locations and extraneous characters. Reviews criticized Donner's heavy-handed approach to the material and the miscasting of the three leads, and it proved to be a commercial failure. Harrison Ford has an uncredited role as a hippie. Frank Sutton, best remembered for his role as Sergeant Carter on the Gomer Pyle TV series, was starring in a 1974 dinner theatre version of the play when he died backstage of a heart attack.

== Awards and nominations ==
Year	Award	Category	Nominated work	Result	Ref.
1965	Tony Awards	Best Play	Luv	Nominated	
1965	Tony Awards	Best Producer of a Play	Claire Nichtern	Won	
1965	Tony Awards	Best Author of a Play	Murray Schisgal	Nominated	
1965	Tony Awards	Best Direction of a Play	Mike Nichols	Won	
1965	Tony Awards	Best Scenic Design of a Play	Oliver Smith	Won	
1965	New York Drama Critics' Circle	Best Play	Luv	Nominated	
