= Jerome Coopersmith =

American dramatist (1925–2023)

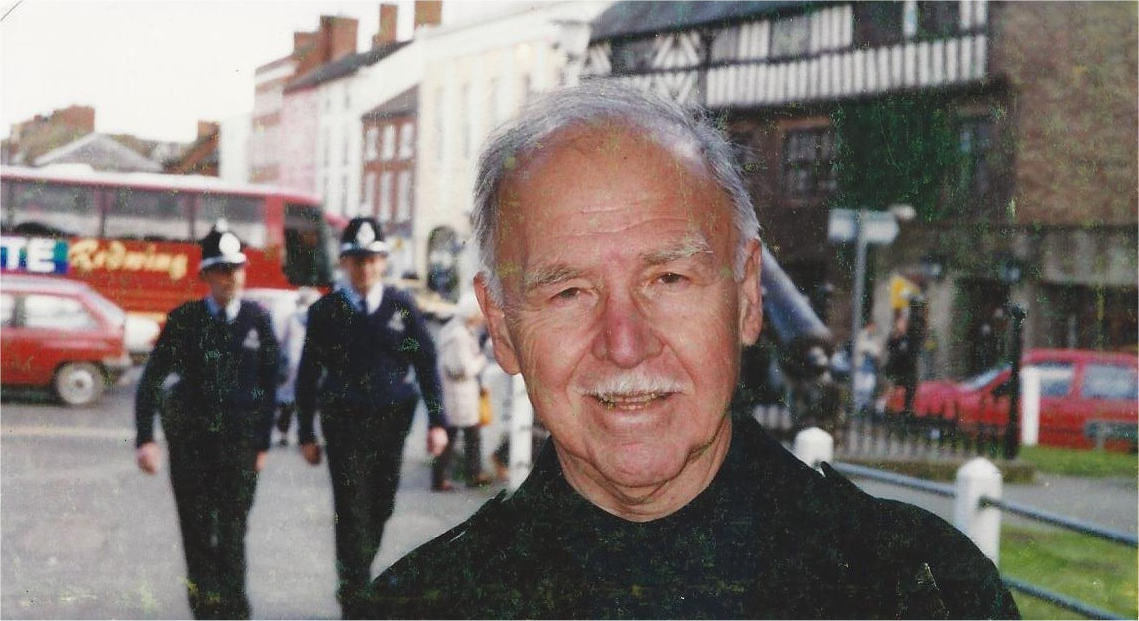
- Coopersmith in London, 2005
- Born: August 11, 1925; New York City, U.S.
- Died: July 21, 2023 (aged 97); Rochester, New York, U.S.
- Education: New York University
- Occupations: Playwright and television screenplay writer
- Years active: 1947–2023
- Notable credit(s): Baker Street (Broadway Musical, 1965); The Apple Tree (Broadway Musical, 1967); Hawaii 5-O (Television Series, 1967-1976); Twas the Night Before Christmas (Television Special, 1974); An American Christmas Carol (Television Movie, 1979)
- Military career
- Allegiance: United States of America
- Branch: United States Army
- Service years: 1943–1945
- Unit: 94th Infantry Division
- Conflicts: World War II
- Awards: Recipient of Purple Heart

Jerome Coopersmith (August 11, 1925 – July 21, 2023) was an American dramatist known for television, theater, and his work as a professor of screenplay writing. Working in the television industry since 1947, Coopersmith authored more than 100 television scripts for anthology dramas, episodic series and television movies and specials. His television work included Johnny Jupiter (1953–1954), Armstrong Circle Theater (1955–1963), Hawaii Five-O (1967–1976), and Streets of San Francisco (1973), and the holiday classics 'Twas the Night Before Christmas (1974) and An American Christmas Carol (1979). Coopersmith's theatrical plays span Broadway, off-Broadway, and regional productions. His Broadway musical, Baker Street (1965), based on the stories of Sherlock Holmes, earned him a Tony Nomination as Author of Best Musical. He was a member of the Dramatists Guild, the Mystery Writers of America, and was a member and past officer of the Writers Guild of America, East. On November 12, 2019, at age 94, Coopersmith was honored with the highest distinction of Chevalier, or Knight, in the National Order of the French Legion of Honor in recognition of his service to France in World War II.

== Early years, family and education ==
Jerome Coopersmith was born in New York in 1925. At age 16, he landed his first job as an office boy for the Shubert Theatrical Company in New York City. Coopersmith's education was interrupted by two years of service in World War II. While part of the 94th Infantry Division of the US Army, he saw combat at The Battle of the Bulge and was awarded a Purple Heart after being shot in the chest. He also was awarded a Combat Infantryman Badge; a Bronze Star Medal; a European Theater of Operations Medal with three battle stars; and the highest distinction in the National Order of the French Legion of Honor.

In 1945, 20-year-old Coopersmith returned to college and earned his degree from New York University.

== Television career ==
Jerome Coopersmith landed his first television job in 1947 with pioneer TV producer Martin Stone, who had a number of shows on the air including the popular children's show Howdy Doody. Coopersmith's first assignment was with the quiz show entitled Americana which challenged a panel of high school students to answer questions about American history based on brief dramatizations performed by actors. Coopersmith wrote the short vignettes of American history which aired on the show.

This led to Stone's production of The Gabby Hayes Show, a series of full half-hour dramas of events in American history. The stories were co-written by Jerome Coopersmith and the more experienced playwright Horton Foote. Foote was a mentor to Coopersmith, and together they wrote more than 50 episodes which aired on NBC. Many successful actors began their television careers on the show, including Ernest Borgnine, Rod Steiger, and Leslie Nielsen.

In 1952, Martin Stone wanted to try his hand at producing a comedy, and so he and Coopersmith came up with the idea of a series called Johnny Jupiter about a television studio janitor, played by Vaughn Taylor, who succeeds in contacting the planet Jupiter. His attempt to explain the strange ways of Earth to the Jupiterians, portrayed by hand puppets, provided the satirical content of the series. In reviewing the show, Jack Gould of The New York Times wrote, “If Mr. Coopersmith can sustain the brilliant pace of the opening show, he obviously is going to move quickly to the head of the class among TV's satirists.” The 13-week series was produced on the independent station, DuMont Television Network, and was extended for another 26 weeks as a sitcom on ABC.

By 1954, the one-hour anthology drama series, such as The Philco Television Playhouse and The United States Steel Hour had become extremely popular. David Susskind, wishing to enter that realm, took over as executive producer of Armstrong Circle Theater, originally a half-hour dramatic show, and recruited Coopersmith to help him change the show's format. The series was reinvented as a one-hour docu-drama based on true stories and real events, and at Coopersmith's suggestion, each episode was narrated by a renowned newscaster to stress the reality of the series. Coopersmith's first episode, The Strange War Of Sergeant Krenzer, was the true story of United States Sergeant Werner Krenzer, an army sergeant in Korea who was given the job of rounding up homeless kids on the streets and placing them in shelters, but the kids didn't want to go. Coopersmith became a principal writer for the Armstrong Circle Theatre, penning 19 additional teleplays airing from 1955 to 1963 and providing him with some extraordinary experiences. For the episode "SSN 571 The Nautilus", Coopersmith took a 6-day underwater journey in America's first atomic submarine, the USS Nautilus, for which his agents and lawyers required David Susskind to insure Coopersmith's life for one million dollars. The episode "I Was Accused" was based on the true experience of actor George Voskovec, who was kept interned at Ellis Island during the days of Senator Joseph McCarthy's "witch hunt". For this teleplay, Coopersmith was presented with the 1956 Robert E. Sherwood Award by a committee that included Eleanor Roosevelt.

In 1964, Coopersmith wrote an episode for Decision: The Conflicts of Harry S. Truman, A documentary series based on the writings of Harry S. Truman during his U.S. presidency, produced by Ben Gradus for Screen Gems. Coopersmith met President Truman when he wrote the 25th episode, "I Am an American", reflecting on the attempted assassination of Truman in 1950. By 1965 the series was widely broadcast and was reaching about 70% of American households.

Throughout the 1950s and early 1960s Coopersmith wrote episodes for many popular television series including Justice, Appointment with Adventure, The Big Story, Decoy, Brenner, and Combat!, as well as anthology dramas for Goodyear Playhouse, The Alcoa Hour, Kraft Television Theater and Hallmark Hall of Fame.

By the mid-1960s the bulk of the TV industry had moved from New York to Hollywood. In 1967, Coopersmith was hired by producer Leonard Freeman to write a script for a new TV series Hawaii Five-O. That script, Samurai, became the 4th episode of hit show's first season. Hawaii Five-O became Coopersmith's focus for the next 8 years, during which he wrote 30 one-hour episodes and 2 feature-length movies for the show. One of Coopersmith's episodes, "Retire In Sunny Hawaii – Forever" featured Helen Hayes, mother of James MacArthur (Danno), in the leading guest role. Hayes received an Emmy Nomination for this performance. Another Coopersmith episode, "I'm A Family Crook... Don't Shoot!" was a comedy-crime drama guest starring Andy Griffith and Joyce Van Patten. "Nine Dragons", one of Coopersmith's feature-length episodes, was filmed in Hong Kong and continues to air as a full-length movie in foreign countries.

Coopersmith continued to write scripts for many television series throughout the 70's and 80's including Streets of San Francisco, Medical Center, The Andros Targets, Nurse, Spenser: For Hire and its spin-off A Man Called Hawk.

Coopersmith also wrote screenplays for TV movies and specials which aired on the major networks in the 1970s and 80s. His first feature film of this era, Mr. Inside/Mr. Outside, was originally planned as a series pilot, and was produced by Philip D'Antoni (The French Connection) in 1973. The movie starred Tony LoBianco and Hal Linden as cops thwarting a gang of diamond smugglers.

In 1973, Coopersmith wrote the screenplay for 'Twas The Night Before Christmas an animated adaptation of Clement Moore's classic poem "A Visit From Saint Nicholas". The Rankin/Bass production featured voices by Joel Grey, George Gobel, Tammy Grimes, and John McGiver. The special became an annual holiday classic, airing on CBS for 20 years from 1974 to 1994. In 1994 The Family Channel (now ABC Family) purchased the syndication rights. The special was also released commercially in most media formats.

Coopersmith celebrated the holiday theme with two additional works. Have I Got A Christmas For You was a 1-hour television special based on the true story of a Jewish congregation whose members filled the jobs of their Christian neighbors for one night, so they could be with their families on Christmas Eve. The holiday special, produced by Gilbert and Joseph Cates in 1977 and directed by Marc Daniels, starred Milton Berle, Steve Allen, Jayne Meadows, Herb Edelman, Jim Backus, and Adrienne Barbeau.

An American Christmas Carol, another holiday-inspired work, is a feature-length movie adaptation of the Charles Dickens classic transplanted to New England during the great depression. The movie, produced by Stanley Chase and Jon Slan, first aired in 1979 with Henry Winkler starring as Benedict Slade (the adaptation version of Scrooge), and David Wayne and Dorian Harewood co-starring. The movie continues to air annually, and was released commercially in all media formats.

Another of Coopersmith's TV movies was an adaption of the Mary Higgins Clark best-selling novel, The Cradle Will Fall, a murder-mystery about a doctor obsessed with creating a fountain-of-youth drug. The movie, which premiered on CBS in 1983, was produced by Joseph Cates and starred Lauren Hutton, Ben Murphy, and James Farentino. Appealing to the network's daytime audience, the story was set in the soap opera Guiding Light's fictional town of Springfield USA, home of Cedars Hospital, and featured six of the soap's key characters in supporting roles.

== Theatrical career ==
In the 1960s, Jerome Coopersmith sought to expand his work from television to the theatrical stage. His first effort was a biographical play entitled Eleanor about the early life of Eleanor Roosevelt when she worked as a volunteer teacher in a New York Settlement House. In 1967 the play was performed in Bridgewater, Massachusetts at Massachusetts State College, where it won the S. Elizabeth Pope Playwriting Award. In 1974, a concert version of the play was performed at Hunter College in New York, with Jane Alexander in the title role. Roosevelt's family and friends attended this performance. Years later, in 1984, the Smithsonian Institution selected Eleanor to be performed in Washington DC in conjunction with the Eleanor Roosevelt Centennial. The show ran in the National Portrait Gallery, a branch of the Smithsonian Institution, and was performed by the students of DC's Catholic University.

Coopersmith's next stage venture was Baker Street a musical based on the stories of Sherlock Holmes by Sir Arthur Conan Doyle. It was produced on Broadway by Alexander H. Cohen, directed by Harold Prince, with a musical score by Marian Grudeff and Raymond Jessel. The show opened in 1965 at The Broadway Theatre, where it ran for nine months and then moved off-Broadway to the Martin Beck Theatre (now the Al Hirschfeld Theatre), for a total of 311 New York performances. The cast included Fritz Weaver, Peter Sallis, Martin Gabel, Inga Swenson, Virginia Vestoff, Teddy Green, and featured the Broadway debuts of Tommy Tune and Christopher Walken in small supporting roles. Bil Baird's Marionettes were also featured in an elaborate scene of Queen Victoria's Diamond Jubilee Parade. The show received three Tony Nominations in 1965 including Coopersmith's nomination in the category Best Author (Musical). Baker Street returned to New York City for an off-Broadway production at the York Theatre in 2001. In November 2016, Baker Street was produced by the 42nd Street Moon Theater in San Francisco. The show ran for three weeks, as part of their 2016 season.

While Baker Street was running, Coopersmith was offered a writing assignment for a show, The Apple Tree, a 3-part musical based on three famous short stories, with music by Jerry Bock and lyrics by Sheldon Harnick. Coopersmith wrote the first act, a playlet based on Mark Twain's stories The Diary of Adam and Eve and Eve's Diary. Bock and Harnick wrote the other two playlets based on Frank R. Stockton's The Lady or the Tiger? and Jules Feiffer's Passionella. The musical, produced by Stuart Ostrow, opened on Broadway in 1966 at the Shubert Theatre, where it ran for 463 performances. This production starred Barbara Harris, Alan Alda, and Larry Blyden, and was directed by Mike Nichols. Harris won the Tony Award for Best Actress in a Musical, 1967. The Apple Tree also received several other major Tony nominations including Best Musical of 1967. The Roundabout Theatre Company mounted a revival in 2006 that ran for a total of 117 performances starring Kristin Chenoweth in the multiple roles originally played by Harris. This production received a Tony nomination for Best Revival Musical of 2007.

Coopersmith's next theater project was Mata Hari, a stage play with music and lyrics by Martin Charnin and Edward Thomas and directed by Vincente Minnelli. The story centered on the alleged spy's affair with a French intelligence officer which led to her execution by a firing squad. Mata Hari was an anti-war play at the time the Vietnam War was unpopular with many Americans. The show had been planned for Broadway by producer David Merrick, and premiered at the National Theatre in Washington, DC. Production challenges led to Merrick withdrawing his support of the musical. In 1968, Coopersmith, Charnin, and Thomas produced the show at New York's off-Broadway Theatre DeLys (now the Lucille Lortel Theater) with the alternate title Ballad For A Firing Squad. In 1996 the York Theatre in New York revived the 1968 version under the original title Mata Hari.

In the early 1970s puppeteer Bil Baird, whose marionettes appeared years earlier in Baker Street, hired Coopersmith to author an original stage version of Pinocchio to be performed by the Baird Marionettes with music by Mary Rodgers and lyrics by Sheldon Harnick. The show ran in 1974 at the Bil Baird Marionette Theater in New York City. In 1988, shortly after Baird's death, Pinocchio was brought back to life, with his son Peter Baird among the cast of puppeteers. The revival was produced by Arthur Cantor and ran at the Minetta Lane Theatre in New York.

Coopersmith continued bringing children's stories to the stage with his musical adaption of Johann David Wyss's Swiss Family Robinson. The play was produced by the team of Barry and Fran Weissler, who later went on to produce many Broadway musical hits. Coopersmith's Swiss Family Robinson toured with the Weisslers' National Theater Company, known for bringing high quality plays to high school, college and adult audiences with professional casts throughout America.

In 1991, Coopersmith collaborated with Lucy Freeman to co-author The Mystery of Anna O, a full-length non-musical play about the first person in the world ever to be psychoanalyzed. "Anna O" was a code name given to the young Austrian woman, so treated to protect her identity, as mental Illness was considered shameful in those days. The play was produced off-Broadway at the John Houseman Studio Theater in the fall of 1992.

In 1992, Ruth Gruber enrolled in Coopersmith's writing class at Hunter College. She shared with him a book she had written, Haven, the remarkable true story of her involvement in the rescue of 1000 Holocaust refugees and her fight to keep them in America. The story inspired Coopersmith's musical stage play, Haven with music by William Goldstein and lyrics by Joe Darion. The show's original title Oswego - An American Haven was named after Fort Oswego, the old army camp in Oswego, New York, where the refugees found themselves imprisoned upon their arrival in America. The 1993 transcript for Oswego - An American Haven can be found in the US Holocaust Memorial Museum in Washington, DC. At Gruber's request, the play's name was changed to Haven so that it would be more closely associated with her book. After the name change, the show was produced in 2001 by Robert Block at the Gindi Theater in Los Angeles. Gruber declared herself highly pleased with the musical version of her book, and celebrated her 90th birthday on stage after curtain call on opening night.

In 1998, Coopersmith and Freeman joined forces again to create Reflections of a Murder, a full-length non-musical mystery about the murder of a famous ballerina, and her charming son who is held as the primary suspect. It was produced at the Arena Stage Theatre on Long Island and was awarded Best New Play of 1998 by the Charlotte Repertory Theater Festival.

Coopersmith's research led him to learn of the controversial relationship between illusionist Harry Houdini and Sir Arthur Conan Doyle over the subject of spiritualism. This inspired his one-act play The Other Side a drama which explores the conflict between Houdini and Doyle, who clashed over whether the dead can be reached. The play has been performed by Sherlock Holmes societies on both sides of the Atlantic. In America, the show was first performed in 2008 by the Baker Street Irregulars in the auditorium of the New York Bar Association. In 2009, the show was staged in London by the Sherlock Holmes Society at the historic 17th century pub The Old Dr. Butler's Head.

== Other work ==
Coopersmith was an adjunct professor at Hunter College and Brooklyn College spanning 1970 to 2009, teaching screenplay and television writing.

Coopersmith wrote a children's book, A Chanukah Fable for Christmas, about a young Jewish boy dreaming for something to celebrate during Christmas time. Illustrated by Syd Hoff, it was published by Putnam in 1969.

== Personal life and demise ==
Coopersmith had two daughters. His grandson Kyle Cheney is a journalist.

Jerome Coopersmith died in Rochester, New York, on July 21, 2023, at age 97.

== Selected filmography & stage plays ==
Selected television episodes

- Americana: Miscellaneous Segments (1947-1949)
- The Gabby Hayes Show: Miscellaneous Episodes (1951-1953)
- Johnny Jupiter: Miscellaneous Episodes (1953-1954)
- Justice: Death for Sale (1954)
- Appointment with Adventure: Stranger on a Plane (1955)
- Armstrong Circle Theatre: Leap for Freedom (1955)
- Armstrong Circle Theatre: The Strange War of Sergeant Krezner (1955)
- Armstrong Circle Theatre: I Was Accused (1955)
- General Motors Theatre: Tolliver's Travels (1956)
- Goodyear Playhouse: The Terrorists (1956)
- The Alcoa Hour: Adventure in Diamonds (1956)
- Armstrong Circle Theatre: Arson: File #732 (1957)
- Decoy: To Trap a Thief (1957)
- The Big Story: House Divided (1957)
- The Big Story: The Frame-Up (1957)
- Armstrong Circle Theatre: The Meanest Crime in the World (1958)
- Armstrong Circle Theatre: The Nautilus (1958)
- Decoy: First Arrest (1958)
- Kraft Theatre: Riddle of a Lady (1958)
- Armstrong Circle Theatre: Prescription-Hypnosis (1959)
- Brenner: Record of Arrest (1959)
- Brenner: Monopoly on Fear (1959)
- Armstrong Circle Theatre: Track of an Unknown: The Story of North American Air Defense (1961)
- Armstrong Circle Theatre: The Battle of Hearts (1961)
- Combat!: Forgotten Front (1962)
- Decision: The Conflicts of Harry S. Truman: I am an American (1964)
- Hawaii Five-O: Samurai (1968)
- Hawaii Five-O: Blind Tiger (1969)
- Hawaii Five-O: Highest Castle, Deepest Grave (1971)
- Hawaii Five-O: I'm a Family Crook Don't Shoot! (1972)
- Hawaii Five-O: Here Today... Gone Tonight (1973)
- Hawaii Five-O: Why Wait Till Uncle Kevin Dies? (1973)
- The Streets of San Francisco: The Victims (1973)
- The Streets of San Francisco: Most Feared in the Jungle (1973)
- Hawaii Five-O: Diary of a Gun (1975)
- Hawaii Five-O: Retire in Sunny Hawaii... Forever (1975)
- Hawaii Five-O: Nine Dragons (1976)
- The Andros Targets: The Killing of a Porno Queen (1977)
- The Andros Targets: Requiem for a Stolen Child: Part 1 & 2 (1977)
- The Andros Targets: The Smut Peddler (1977)
- Nurse: Impressions (1982)
- Spenser: For Hire : Arthur's Wake (1988)
- A Man Called Hawk : Passing the Bar (1989)

Selected television movies and specials

- The Story of Roger Williams (1952)
- Mr. Inside/Mr. Outside (1973)
- 'Twas the Night Before Christmas
- Hawaii Five-O: Nine Dragons (1976)
- Have I Got a Christmas for You (1977)
- An American Christmas Carol
- The Cradle Will Fall (1983)

Selected stage plays

- Baker Street (1965)
- The Apple Tree (1966)
- Mata Hari (musical)|Mata Hari (1967)
- Ballad for a Firing Squad (1968)
- Eleanor (1965)
- Pinocchio (1973)
- The Mystery of Anna O (1992)
- Reflections of a Murder (1998)
- Haven (2001)
- The Other Side (2009)

== Awards and recognition ==
- Robert E. Sherwood Award: "I Was Accused", Armstrong Circle Theater (1956)
- Tony Award Nomination, Best Book (Musical): "Baker Street" (1965)
- Edgar Allan Poe Award Nomination, Best Television Episode: "Here Today, Gone Tonight", Hawaii Five-O (1974)
- Smithsonian Institution Honor, Eleanor Roosevelt Centennial: "Eleanor" (1984)
- Richard B. Jablow Award, Writers Guild of America East (1982)
- Charlotte Repertory Theater, Best New Play in America: "Reflections of a Murder" (1998)
- Prize-Winner, National 10 Minute Play Festival, McLean Drama Company, Washington DC: "Nik & Ida" (2013)

== Memberships and associations ==
- Writers Guild of America East
- Dramatists Guild of America
- Mystery Writers of America
