= Oliver Smith (designer) =

American scenic designer and interior designer (1918–1994)

- Born: February 13, 1918; Waupun, Wisconsin, U.S.
- Died: January 23, 1994 (aged 75); Brooklyn, New York City, New York, U.S.
- Occupations: Scenic designer and interior designer

Oliver Smith (February 13, 1918 – January 23, 1994) was an American scenic designer and interior designer.

== Biography ==
Born in Waupun, Wisconsin, Smith attended Penn State, after which he moved to New York City and began to form friendships that blossomed into working relationships with such talents as Leonard Bernstein, Jerome Robbins, Carson McCullers, and Agnes de Mille. In his early 20s, he lived at February House in Brooklyn with a coterie of famous people centered on George Davis and W. H. Auden. He tended the furnace, washed the dishes, and soothed the tempers of both residents and visitors. His career was launched with his designs for Léonide Massine's ballet Saratoga in 1941 and de Mille's Rodeo in 1942.

Smith designed dozens of Broadway musicals, films (Guys and Dolls, The Band Wagon, Oklahoma!, Porgy and Bess), and operas (La Traviata). His association with the American Ballet Theatre (ABT) began in 1944, when he collaborated with Robbins and Bernstein on the ballet Fancy Free, which served as the inspiration for the musical On the Town. The following year, he became co-director of ABT with Lucia Chase, a position he held until 1980. He did the scenic design for the 1949 Broadway revue, Along Fifth Avenue, starring Nancy Walker and Jackie Gleason, which ran for 180 performances. He designed the sets for ABT's complete 1967 production of Swan Lake, the first full-length version mounted by an American company.

Smith also trained young designers for many years, serving on the faculty of New York University's Tisch School of the Arts, where he taught master classes in scenic design.

Throughout his career, Smith was nominated for 25 Tony Awards, often multiple times in the same year, and won 10. He was nominated for the Academy Award for Best Art Direction for his work on Guys and Dolls.

Smith was inducted into the American Theater Hall of Fame in 1981. In 2011, Smith was inducted into the National Museum of Dance's Mr. & Mrs. Cornelius Vanderbilt Whitney Hall of Fame.

Smith redesigned the ballroom of the Waldorf-Astoria Hotel (New York City Landmark and Interior Landmark), New York, in the early 1960s.

Smith died of emphysema in Brooklyn, New York.

== Notable productions ==
- 1944: On the Town
- 1947: High Button Shoes
- 1949: Along Fifth Avenue
- 1949: Gentlemen Prefer Blondes
- 1951: Paint Your Wagon
- 1953: Carnival in Flanders
- 1954: On Your Toes (revival)
- 1955: Will Success Spoil Rock Hunter?
- 1956: My Fair Lady
- 1956: Auntie Mame
- 1956: Candide
- 1957: West Side Story
- 1957: Brigadoon (revival)
- 1957: Carousel (revival)
- 1958: Flower Drum Song
- 1959: The Sound of Music
- 1959: Take Me Along
- 1959: Goodbye Charlie
- 1960: Camelot
- 1960: The Unsinkable Molly Brown
- 1960: Becket
- 1961: The Night of the Iguana
- 1963: Barefoot in the Park
- 1964: Hello, Dolly!
- 1964: Ben Franklin in Paris
- 1964: Luv
- 1965: Kelly
- 1965: Baker Street
- 1965: The Odd Couple
- 1965: On a Clear Day You Can See Forever
- 1965: Cactus Flower
- 1966: Breakfast at Tiffany's
- 1966: Show Boat (revival)
- 1967: I Do! I Do!
- 1967: Illya Darling
- 1968: Plaza Suite
- 1969: Dear World
- 1969: The Last of the Red Hot Lovers
- 1970: Lovely Ladies, Kind Gentlemen
- 1971: The Most Important Man
- 1973: The Women (revival)
- 1978: First Monday in October
- 1979: Carmelina
- 1982: 84 Charing Cross Road

== See also ==
- List of Tony Award records
