= Kipps =

1905 novel by H. G. Wells

Kipps: The Story of a Simple Soul
- First edition
- Author: H. G. Wells
- Language: English
- Genre: Social novel
- Publisher: Macmillan
- Publication date: 1905
- Publication place: United Kingdom
- Pages: 380
- Text: Kipps: The Story of a Simple Soul at Wikisource

Kipps: The Story of a Simple Soul is a novel by H. G. Wells, first published in 1905. It was reportedly Wells's own favourite among his works, and it has been adapted for stage, cinema and television productions, including the musical Half a Sixpence.

== Plot ==
The eponymous character is Arthur "Artie" Kipps, an illegitimate orphan. In Book I, "The Making of Kipps", he is raised by his aged aunt and uncle, who keep a little shop in New Romney on the southeastern coast of Kent. He attends the Cavendish Academy – "a middle-class school", not a "board school" – in Hastings in East Sussex. "By inherent nature he had a sociable disposition", and he befriends Sid Pornick, the son of a neighbour. Kipps also falls in love with Sid's younger sister, Ann. Ann gives him half a sixpence as a token of their love when, at 14, he is apprenticed to the Folkestone Drapery Bazaar, run by Mr Shalford.

The Pornicks move away and Kipps forgets Ann. He becomes infatuated with Helen Walshingham, who teaches a woodcarving class on Thursday nights. Chitterlow, an actor and aspiring playwright, meets Kipps by running into him with his bicycle, and they have a drunken evening together that leads to Kipps being "swapped" (dismissed) from his job. Chitterlow then brings to his attention a newspaper advertisement that leads to an unexpected inheritance for Kipps from his grandfather of a house and £26,000.

In Book II, "Mr Coote the Chaperon", Kipps fails in his attempt to adapt to his new position in the social hierarchy of Folkestone. By chance he meets a Mr Coote, who undertakes his social education. That leads to renewed contact with Helen Walshingham, and they become engaged. However, the process of bettering himself alienates Kipps more and more, especially since Helen makes it clear that she wants to take advantage of Kipps' fortune to establish herself and her brother in London society. Chance meetings with Sid, who has become a socialist, and then with Ann, who is now a housemaid, lead Kipps to abandon social conventions and his engagement to Helen, and marry his childhood sweetheart.

In Book III, "Kippses", the attempt to find a house suitable to his new status precipitates Kipps back into a struggle with the "complex and difficult" English social system. Kipps and Ann quarrel. Then they learn that Helen's brother, a solicitor, has lost most of their fortune through speculation. That leads to a happier situation when Kipps opens a branch of the Associated Booksellers' Trading Union (Limited) in Hythe and they have a son. The success of Chitterlow's play, in which Kipps has invested £2,000, restores their fortune, but they are content to remain shopkeepers in a small coastal town.

== Themes ==
Kipps is a rags-to-riches study in class differences, and the novel's chief dramatic interest is in how the protagonist negotiates the intellectual, moral and emotional difficulties that come with wealth and a change of social status. Kipps is the only character in the novel who is fully developed and all events are narrated from his point of view. A narrator's voice offers occasional comments, but only towards the end of the novel does this voice speak out in a page-long denunciation of "the ruling power of this land, Stupidity," which is "a monster, a lumpish monster, like some great clumsy griffin thing, like the Crystal Palace labyrinthodon, like Coote, like the leaden Goddess of the Dunciad, like some fat, proud flunkey, like pride, like indolence, like all that is darkening and heavy and obstructive in life".

Kipps's friend Sid becomes a socialist and houses a boarder, Masterman, who argues that society "is hopelessly out of joint. Man is a social animal with a mind nowadays that goes around the globe, and a community cannot be happy in one part and unhappy in another.... Society is one body, and it is either well or ill. That's the law. This society we live in is ill." However, while Kipps admires Masterman and is in part receptive to his point of view, he tells Ann that "I don't agree with this socialism." At one time Wells intended to develop Masterman into a major character who would convert Kipps to socialism, and he wrote several versions in which he played an important role at the end of the novel.

The speech of Artie Kipps is a careful rendering of the pronunciation of the English language as Wells first learned it. Kipps never masters another way of speaking, and after much effort he reverts to the manner of his upbringing: "'Speckylated it!' said Kipps, with an illustrative flourish of the arm that failed to illustrate. 'Bort things dear and sold 'em cheap, and played the 'ankey-pankey jackass with everything we got. That's what I mean 'e's done, Ann.'"

== Writing and publication ==
Wells worked on Kipps for seven years, completing a draft entitled The Wealth of Mr Waddy in January 1899 and finishing the novel as it now exists in May 1904. Kipps changed considerably over this period of extended drafting: the manuscript, now in the Wells Archive at the University of Illinois, consists of more than 6,000 sheets, and includes, in the words of Harris Wilson, "literally scores of false starts, digressions, and abandoned episodes."

In the finished novel Book 1 and Book 2 are of roughly comparable lengths, but Book 3 is much shorter. This disproportion reflects the fact that originally the third Book contained an extended episode in which the consumptive socialist Masterman visits Kipps in Hythe and dies slowly, lecturing about revolution as he goes and speculating about the possibilities of utopian communism. Critics have praised Wells for cutting this episode, whilst also seeing it as a sign of things to come in his writing career: "Wells, in this episode, slips into the discursive and didactic; his characters are almost forgotten as they expound his own social ideas and criticism ... [it is] Wells's first substantial attempt, and acknowledged failure, since he left it out, to reconcile narrative and ideology."

Wells was eager for the novel to succeed, and he harassed his publisher, Macmillan, with ideas for unorthodox publicity stunts, such as sending men with sandwich boards into the theatre district in the West End of London, or posters saying "Kipps Worked Here" outside Portsmouth & Southsea Railway Station.

== Reception ==
Though Kipps eventually became one of Wells's most successful novels, at first it was slow to sell. While 12,000 copies had been sold by the end of 1905, more than a quarter of a million had been sold by the 1920s.

The novel received high praise from Henry James, but Arnold Bennett complained that it showed "ferocious hostility to about five-sixths of the characters".

Wells's biographer David C. Smith calls the novel "a masterpiece" and argued that with Kipps, The History of Mr Polly, and Tono-Bungay, Wells "is able to claim a permanent place in English fiction, close to Dickens, because of the extraordinary humanity of some of the characters, but also because of his ability to invoke a place, a class, a social scene."

== Adaptations ==
Kipps has been adapted for other media several times.

- In 1912 Wells and Rudolf Besier adapted it for the stage.
- In 1921 there was a silent film version set in Folkestone, and (for the final scene) shot on location in Canterbury and partly at the Savoy Hotel. Wells was an extra in the film.
- The 1941 film adaptation starred Michael Redgrave in the title role.
- The eight-part television serial by Granada Television, with Brian Murray as Kipps, was shown on the ITV network between 14 October and 2 December 1960; it no longer exists.
- The stage musical Half a Sixpence by David Heneker and Beverley Cross, based on Kipps, was originally mounted in the West End of London as a star vehicle for Tommy Steele and transferred to Broadway with Steele in the 1965–1966 season. It was filmed in 1967, again with Steele in the starring role.
- A 2016 revival of Half a Sixpence premiered at the Chichester Festival Theatre. The show moved to the West End and one of the performances was filmed and broadcast on Sky Arts and NowTV on 21 December 2019.
- In 1984 Michelene Wandor dramatised Kipps in five parts for BBC Radio 4, starring Paul Daneman as the narrator (referred to as "H. G. Wells"), Mark Straker as Kipps and Nickolas Grace as Chitterlow.
- A second BBC Radio 4 adaptation, by Mike Walker, this time in two parts, was broadcast in May 2006, starring Bryan Dick as Kipps, Donald Sumpter as Kipps's Uncle, and Deborah Findlay as Kipps's Aunt.
