= Half a Sixpence (2016 musical) =

- Poster for the West End production
- Music: George Stiles; David Heneker
- Lyrics: Anthony Drewe; David Heneker
- Book: Julian Fellowes
- Basis: Kipps by H. G. Wells
- Premiere: 14 July 2016: Chichester Festival Theatre
- Productions: 2016 Chichester; 2016 West End

Half a Sixpence (also Kipps - The New Half A Sixpence Musical) is a stage musical based on the 1905 novel Kipps by H. G. Wells and the original 1963 musical, with music by George Stiles and Anthony Drewe, and lyrics by Anthony Drewe and Heneker, featuring several of the original songs by Heneker, and book by Julian Fellowes.

== Background ==
The original musical of Half a Sixpence, based on the novel Kipps by H. G. Wells, featured music and lyrics by David Heneker and book by Beverley Cross. The musical was written as a star vehicle for British pop star Tommy Steele who performed the role of Kipps originally in London in 1963, Broadway in 1965 and in the 1967 film adaptation. It was evident that the show relied on Steele as the star vehicle as he featured in twelve of the musical's fifteen songs.

Following the success with Mary Poppins, producer Cameron Mackintosh reunited the same team of George Stiles and Anthony Drewe to adapt Heneker's original songs and create new material for the production, with Julian Fellowes writing an entirely new book. The creative team also reunites Stiles and Drewe with Fellowes after Mary Poppins and the new musical adaptation of The Wind in the Willows (which also reunites director Rachel Kavanaugh, who also directed Stiles and Drewe's Peter Pan: A Musical Adventure).

== Production history ==
=== Chichester and West End production (2016-17) ===
The musical premiered at Chichester Festival Theatre from 14 July to 2 September 2016 as a co-production with Cameron Mackintosh. It was originally announced that Bryan Dick would star as Kipps, however he later withdrew to appear in the West End production of Hobson's Choice. It was later announced that newcomer Charlie Stemp would take over as Arthur Kipps alongside Devon-Elise Johnson as Ann Pornick, Ian Bartholomew as Chitterlow, Emma Williams as Helen Walsingham and Vivien Parry as Mrs Walsingham. The production is directed by Rachel Kavanaugh, designed by Paul Brown, choreographed by Andrew Wright, orchestrations by William David Brohn, lighting by Paule Constable, sound by Mick Potter and video design by Luke Halls.

Following Chichester, the production transferred to the West End in London at the Noël Coward Theatre with previews beginning 29 October and press night on 17 November 2016. It featured the original Chichester cast and ran for ten months in the West End following three extensions to its limited run. Combined with the Chichester run, the production played around 400 performances.

== Characters and cast ==
Character	Chichester	West End
Character	2016	
Arthur Kipps	Charlie Stemp	Charlie Stemp
Chitterlow	Ian Bartholomew	Ian Bartholomew
Ann Pornick	Devon-Elise Johnson	Devon-Elise Johnson
Helen Walsingham	Emma Williams	Emma Williams
Mrs Walsingham	Vivien Parry	Vivien Parry
Lady Punnet	Jane How	Jane How
James Walsingham / Photographer	Gerard Carey	Gerard Carey
Swing	David Birch	David Birch
Mrs Bindo-Bott	Kimberly Blake	Kimberly Blake
Uncle Bert	James Paterson	David Burrows
Head Waiter / Assistant Dance Captain	Nick Butcher	Nick Butcher
Shalford / Foster	Jon Conroy	Jon Conroy
Mrs Wace / Dance Captain	Jaye Julliet Elster	Jaye Julliet Elster
Mr Wace	Tim Hodges	Tim Hodges
Sid Pornick	Alex Hope	Alex Hope
Flo	Bethany Huckle	Bethany Huckle
Swing	Samantha Hull	Samantha Hull
Mary	Rebecca Jayne Davies	Rebecca Jayne Davies
Miss Ross	Jenifer Louise Jones	Jenifer Louise Jones
Hayes	Matthew Dale	Matthew Dale
Policeman	Philip Marriott	Philip Marriott
Carshot / Maxwell	Harry Morrison	Harry Morrison
Buggins	Sam O' Rourke	Sam O' Rourke
Pierce	Callum Train	Callum Train
Mildred	Lauren Varnham	Lauren Varnham
Aunt Susan / Lady Dacre	Annie Wensak	Annie Wensak

== Musical numbers ==
Act I

- "Half a Sixpence" - Arthur Kipps and Ann Pornick
- "Look Alive" - Company
- "Money to Burn" - Arthur Kipps, Mr Shalford, Sid Pornick, Buggins, Pierce and Flo
- "Believe in Yourself" - Arthur Kipps and Helen Walsingham
- "She's Too Far Above Me" - Arthur Kipps
- "Money to Burn" (Reprise) - Arthur Kipps and Chitterlow
- "A Proper Gentleman" - Arthur Kipps, Sid Pornick, Buggins, Pearce and Flo
- "Half a Sixpence" (Reprise) - Arthur Kipps and Ann Pornick
- "Long Ago" - Ann Pornick
- "The Joy of the Theatre" - Chitterlow and Company
- "Just a Few Little Things" - Helen Walsingham and Arthur Kipps
- "A Little Touch of Happiness" - Ann Pornick and Flo
- "If The Rain's Got to Fall" - Mrs Walsingham, Arthur Kipps, Foster, Helen Walsingham, Lady Punnet and Company

Act II

- "The One That's Run Away" - Chitterlow & Arthur Kipps
- "Pick Out a Simple Tune" - Arthur Kipps and Ann Pornick
- "You Never Get Anything Right / I Know Who I Am" - Arthur Kipps and Ann Pornick
- "We'll Build a Palace / I Only Want a Little House" - Arthur Kipps, Helen Walsingham, Mrs Walsingham, James Walsingham
- "In the Middle There's Me" - Arthur Kipps, Buggins, Sid Pornick and Pierce
- "Long Ago" (Reprise) - Arthur Kipps and Ann Pornick
- "Flash Bang Wallop" - Arthur Kipps, Ann Pornick, Mr. Shalford, Pearce, Sid Pornick, Buggins, Flo, Photographer and Company
- "Flash Bang Wallop" (Reprise)- Chitterlow, Arthur Kipps, Ann Pornick, Mr. Shalford, Pearce, Sid Pornick, Buggins, Flo, Photographer and Company
- "Finale" - Company

Half a Sixpence (2016 Cast Recording)

Soundtrack album cast recording by Various
- Released: 18 November 2016
- Length: 70:44
- Label: First Night Records

=== Cast Recording ===
On Friday 18 November 2016, the 2016 London Cast Recording was released by First Night Records on CD and iTunes digital download. It features 23 tracks and was recorded live during the final three performances in the Chichester run.

No.	Title	Length
1.	"Half a Sixpence"	2:49
2.	"Look Alive"	3:38
3.	"Money To Burn / Money To Burn (Reprise)"	4:25
4.	"Believe In Yourself"	2:12
5.	"She's Too Far Above Me"	1:51
6.	"A Proper Gentleman"	3:34
7.	"Half a Sixpence (Reprise)"	2:02
8.	"Long Ago"	1:47
9.	"Back the Right Horse"	2:55
10.	"Just a Few Little Things"	3:58
11.	"A Little Touch of Happiness"	3:33
12.	"If the Rain's Got to Fall"	4:27
13.	"The One Who's Run Away"	3:27
14.	"Pick Out a Simple Tune"	5:23
15.	"You Never Get Anything Right / I Know Who I Am"	3:08
16.	"We'll Build a Palace / I Only Want a Little House"	3:46
17.	"In the Middle There's Me"	2:50
18.	"Long Ago (Reprise)"	1:36
19.	"Flash, Bang, Wallop"	5:52
20.	"Flash, Bang, Wallop (Reprise)"	1:55
21.	"Finale"	1:15
22.	"Simple Tune Bows"	1:27
23.	"Playout (Bonus Track)"	3:21
24.	"The Joy of the Theatre (Bonus Track)"	3:54
Total length:		74:38

== Home media ==
A filmed recording of the 2016 West End production was broadcast on Sky Arts on Wednesday 29 December 2021 under the title of Kipps (the musical's new licensing name).

== Licensing ==
The musical is licensed through Music Theatre International Europe to professional and amateur productions under the title Kipps - The New Half a Sixpence Musical.

== Awards and nominations ==
=== London Production ===
Year	Award Ceremony	Category	Nominee	Result	Ref
2017	BroadwayWorld UK / West End Awards	Best Revival of a Musical		Nominated	
2017	BroadwayWorld UK / West End Awards	Best Actor in a New Production of a Musical	Charlie Stemp	Nominated	
2017	BroadwayWorld UK / West End Awards	Best Actress in a New Production of a Musical	Devon Elise-Johnson	Nominated	
2017	BroadwayWorld UK / West End Awards	Best Supporting Actress in a New Production of a Musical	Emma Williams	Won	
2017	BroadwayWorld UK / West End Awards	Best New Regional Production		Won	
2017	Whatsonstage.com Awards	Best New Musical		Nominated	
2017	Whatsonstage.com Awards	Best Actor in a Musical	Charlie Stemp	Won	
2017	Whatsonstage.com Awards	Best Actress in a Musical	Devon Elise-Johnson	Nominated	
2017	Whatsonstage.com Awards	Best Supporting Actor in a Musical	Ian Bartholomew	Nominated	
2017	Whatsonstage.com Awards	Best Supporting Actress in a Musical	Emma Williams	Won	
2017	Whatsonstage.com Awards	Best Direction	Rachel Kavanaugh	Nominated	
2017	Whatsonstage.com Awards	Best Choreography	Andrew Wright	Won	
2017	Whatsonstage.com Awards	Best Costume Design	Paul Brown	Nominated	
2017	Laurence Olivier Awards	Best Actor in a Musical	Charlie Stemp	Nominated	
2017	Laurence Olivier Awards	Best Supporting Actor in a Musical	Ian Bartholomew	Nominated	
2017	Laurence Olivier Awards	Best Supporting Actress in a Musical	Emma Williams	Nominated	
