= Baker Street (musical) =

1965 musical

- A Musical Adventure of Sherlock Holmes
- Original Cast Recording [CD reissue]
- Music: Marian Grudeff, Raymond Jessel and Jerry Bock
- Lyrics: Marian Grudeff, Raymond Jessel and Sheldon Harnick
- Book: Jerome Coopersmith
- Basis: The Sherlock Holmes stories of Sir Arthur Conan Doyle
- Productions: 1965 Broadway

Baker Street is a 1965 musical with a book by Jerome Coopersmith and music and lyrics by Marian Grudeff and Raymond Jessel, based on the tales of Sherlock Holmes.

== Background ==
Loosely based on the 1891 Sherlock Holmes story "A Scandal in Bohemia" by Arthur Conan Doyle with elements of "The Final Problem" and "The Empty House" as well, it is set in and around London in 1897, the year in which England celebrated the Diamond Jubilee of Queen Victoria (an event marked by an elaborate royal procession depicted by Bil Baird's marionettes). The musical veers from Conan Doyle's work in that Irene Adler becomes an associate of Holmes rather than his opponent, thus allowing an element of romance between the two.

Because of problems the show went through during out of town tryouts, Sheldon Harnick and Jerry Bock, the successful composing team of Fiddler on the Roof were brought in to contribute additional songs including "Cold Clear World" and "I Shall Miss You". They also wrote "I'm in London Again" which was the first number for Irene Adler, but after opening night, this number (which can be heard on the cast album) was dropped and replaced by another Bock-Harnick composition, "Buffalo Belle", which had Irene Adler performing an elaborate Wild West number. Stereo Review Magazine's review described the score as being "Warmed-over Gilbert & Sullivan with a gelid sauce of Lerner & Loewe".

== Original cast and characters ==
Character	Broadway (1965)
Sherlock Holmes	Fritz Weaver
Irene Adler	Inga Swenson
Professor Moriarty	Martin Gabel
Dr. Watson	Peter Sallis
Inspector Gregson	Patrick Horgan
Wiggins	Teddy Green
Mrs. Hudson	Paddi Edwards
Baxter	Martin Wolfson
Inspector Lestrade	Daniel Keyes
Daisy	Virginia Vestoff
Murillo	Jay Norman

== Musical numbers ==
Act I

- "It's So Simple" – Holmes, Watson, Lestrade, Captain Gregg
- "I'm in London Again" – Irene
- "Leave It to Us, Guv" – Wiggins, The Irregulars
- "Letters" – Irene
- "Cold, Clear World" – Holmes
- "Finding Words for Spring" – Irene
- "What a Night This Is Going to Be" – Holmes, Watson, Irene, Daisy
- "London Underworld" – Company
- "I Shall Miss You" – Moriarty

Act II

- "Roof Space" – Wiggins, The Irregulars
- "A Married Man" – Watson
- "I'd Do It Again" – Irene
- "Pursuit" – Holmes
- "Jewelry" – Baxter, Criminals

Richard Burton recorded "A Married Man" as a single in 1965.

== Productions ==
The musical opened on Broadway at the Broadway Theatre on February 16, 1965 running to October 30, and then transferred to the Martin Beck Theatre (now the Al Hirschfeld Theatre) on November 3, 1965, where it closed on November 14, 1965 after a total of 311 performances and six previews. Directed by Hal Prince, the cast included Fritz Weaver, Peter Sallis, Martin Gabel, Inga Swenson, Virginia Vestoff, Teddy Green, and, in supporting roles, Christopher Walken and Tommy Tune, both in their Broadway debuts.

Producer Alexander H. Cohen felt the show was such an event that he announced, prior to the opening, men would not be admitted unless they were clad in jackets and ties, and women would be allowed in only if they wore dresses. This policy quickly changed once the mixed reviews were in.

== Awards and nominations ==
=== Original Broadway production ===
Year	Award	Category	Nominee	Result
1965	Tony Award	Best Author	Jerome Coopersmith	Nominated
1965	Tony Award	Best Performance by a Leading Actress in a Musical	Inga Swenson	Nominated
1965	Tony Award	Best Scenic Design	Oliver Smith	Won
1965	Tony Award	Best Costume Design	Motley	Nominated
