= Beverley Cross =

British screenwriter (1931–1998)

Alan Beverley Cross
- Born: 13 April 1931; London, England
- Died: 20 March 1998 (aged 66); London, England
- Occupations: Screenwriter, playwright
- Years active: 1960–1998
- Spouses: Elizabeth Clunies-Ross (m. 1955, divorced); Gayden Collins (m. 1965, divorced); Maggie Smith (m. 1975)
- Relatives: Chris Larkin (step-son); Toby Stephens (step-son)

Alan Beverley Cross (13 April 1931 – 20 March 1998) was an English playwright, librettist, and screenwriter.

== Early life ==
Born in London into a theatrical family, and educated at the Nautical College Pangbourne, Cross started off by writing children's plays in the 1950s. He achieved instant success with his first play, One More River, which dealt with a mutiny in which a crew puts its first officer on trial for manslaughter. The play premiered in 1958 at the New Shakespeare Theatre Liverpool, starring Robert Shaw, directed by Sam Wanamaker, and in 1959, still with Robert Shaw, directed by Guy Hamilton at the Duke of York's Theatre in London.

== Career ==
Cross' second play, Strip the Willow, was to make a star out of his future wife, Maggie Smith, though the play never received a London production. In 1962, he translated Marc Camoletti's French farce Boeing Boeing, which had a lengthy run in the West End. In 1964, he directed the play in Sydney. Another success was Half a Sixpence, a musical comedy based on the H. G. Wells novel Kipps, for which he wrote the book, and for which he received a nomination for a Tony Award for Best Author. This opened in 1963, and like his first play, ran in London for more than a year.

He also wrote opera librettos for Richard Rodney Bennett (The Mines of Sulphur, All the King's Men, and Victory) and Nicholas Maw (The Rising of the Moon).

Cross later became well known for his screenplays, including Jason and the Argonauts (1963), The Long Ships (1964), Genghis Khan (1965), and Clash of the Titans (1981). He also adapted Half a Sixpence for the 1967 film version. He also worked uncredited on the script for Lawrence of Arabia (1962), although whether any of his material made it to the final edit is unknown.

== Personal life ==
Cross had known Maggie Smith since her years acting in Oxford in the 1950s, but they did not marry until 1975, following the end of Smith's marriage to Robert Stephens. He was the stepfather of Smith's children from that marriage, actors Chris Larkin and Toby Stephens. He died in London in 1998 aged 66 from an aneurysm.
