= Inga Swenson =

American actress (1932–2023)

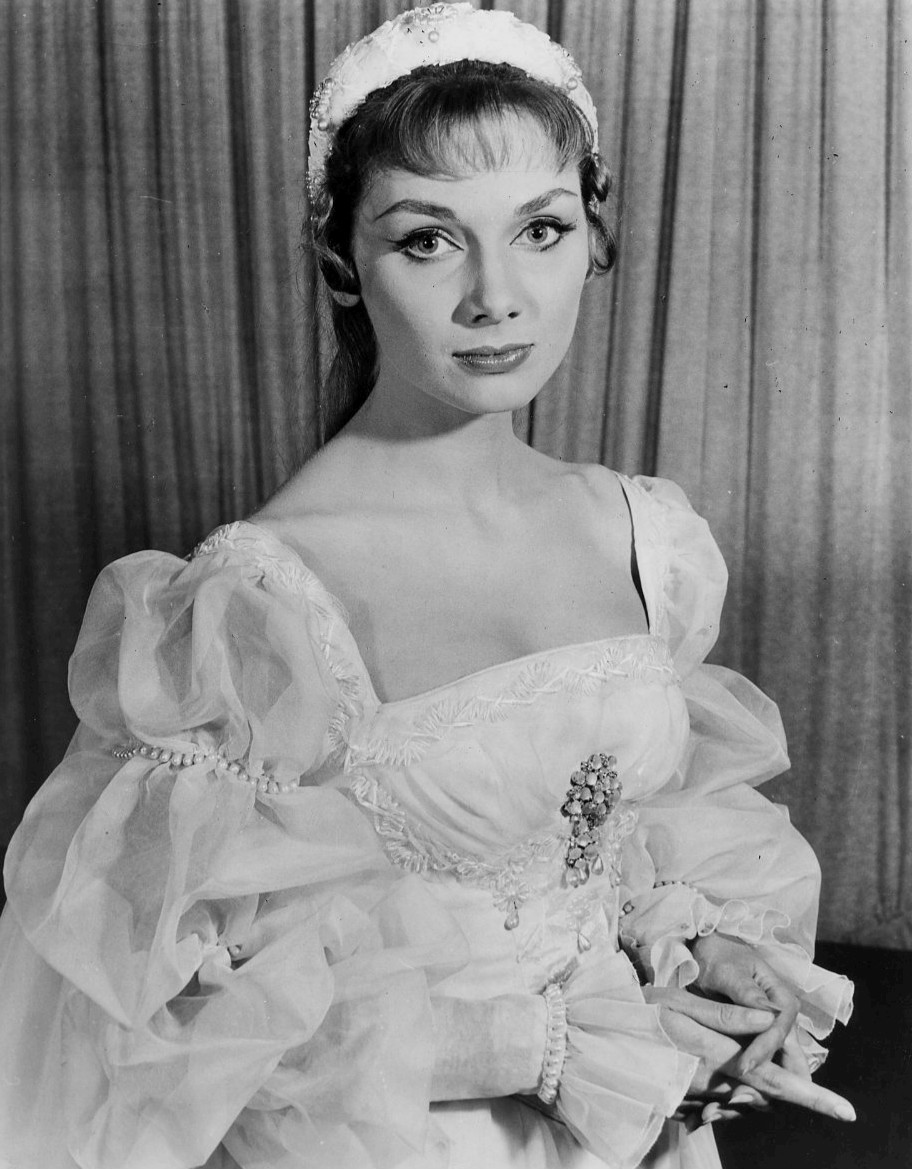
- Swenson as Ophelia in the American Shakespeare Festival production of Hamlet, 1958
- Born: December 29, 1932; Omaha, Nebraska, U.S.
- Died: July 23, 2023 (aged 90); Los Angeles, California, U.S.
- Education: Northwestern University
- Occupations: Actress; singer
- Years active: 1949–1998
- Television: Benson
- Spouse: Lowell Harris (m. 1953)
- Children: 2

Inga Swenson (December 29, 1932 – July 23, 2023) was an American actress and singer. She appeared in multiple Broadway productions and was nominated twice for the Tony Award for Best Actress in a Musical for her performances as Lizzie Curry in 110 in the Shade and Irene Adler in Baker Street. She also spent seven years portraying Gretchen Kraus in the ABC comedy series Benson.

== Early years ==
Inga Swenson was born in Omaha, Nebraska, on December 29, 1932, (Note: Multiple sources report that Swenson was born on December 29, 1932. However, at least one other source says that she was born on December 19, 1934, although it acknowledges that other sources say that she was born in 1932.) the youngest of three children of Geneva Pauline (née Seeger) and Axel Carl Richard "A.C.R." Swenson. Her father died in a car accident when she was 15.

Swenson graduated from Omaha Central High School in 1950. While attending OCHS, as a junior, Swenson won the state title in the National Forensic League's speech contest and later, she won the NFL's national contest. As a high school senior she was considered the school's best vocalist and she was also the president of the Central High Players. She studied drama at Northwestern University under Alvina Krause, among others.

== Career ==
Early in her career, Swenson had supporting roles in the films Advise & Consent (1962) and The Miracle Worker (1962) in which she played Helen Keller's mother. Swenson was a trained lyric soprano and starred on Broadway in New Faces (c. 1956), and The First Gentleman (1959), receiving Tony Award nominations for Best Actress in a Musical for her performances in 110 in the Shade (1964) and Baker Street (1965). A life member of The Actors Studio, she said that her favorite role was Lizzie Currie in the musical 110 in the Shade.

Swenson appeared in two episodes of Bonanza: "Inger, My Love" (1962) and "Journey Remembered" (1963) as Hoss's mother. She portrayed Gretchen Kraus, the autocratic and acerbic German cook (later head housekeeper and budget director) in the TV sitcom Benson. Gretchen's catchphrase was, "I hear you!" and known for childhood stories, starting with, "When I was a little girl in Bavaria..." Her portrayal garnered three Emmy nominations. She was cast after having appeared in a multi-episode stint as the conniving revenge-seeking Ingrid Svenson, the Swedish birth mother of Corinne Tate (Diana Canova), on the TV sitcom Soap. (Benson was a spinoff of Soap and shared the same producers.) She also appeared as Northern matriarch Maude Hazard in the mini-series North and South in 1985 and again in 1986.

Swenson retired from acting in 1998.

== Personal life and death ==
Swenson married actor/singer Lowell Harris in 1953, and the couple had two sons: Mark and James. James died in a motorcycle accident in 1987, at the age of 26. Mark is retired from the motion picture and television film editing field and the financial services industry.

Swenson died in Los Angeles on July 23, 2023, at the age of 90.

== Stage credits ==
- Stage debut – Maid, Peg O' My Heart, Berkshire Playhouse, Stockbridge, MA, 1949.
- Broadway debut – Singer, New Faces of '56 (revue), Ethel Barrymore Theatre, 1956.
- London debut – Lizzie Currie, 110 in the Shade, Palace Theatre, 1967.

=== Principal stage appearances ===
- Princess Alexandria, The Swan, Minnie Fay, The Merchant of Yonkers, singer, Sing Out, Sweet Land, and extra, Othello, all Playhouse Theatre, Eagles Mere, Pennsylvania, 1952.
- Aunt Anna Rose, Treasure Hunt, Monica, The Medium, Lucy, The Telephone, Dunyasha, The Cherry Orchard, Alizon Elliot, The Lady's Not for Burning, and Isabelle, Ring 'round the Moon, all Playhouse Theatre, Eagles Mere, Pennsylvania, 1953.
- Georgie Elgin, The Country Girl, Celia Copplestone, The Cocktail Party, Mrs. Larue, Mrs. McThing, Countess Aurelia, The Madwoman of Chaillot, and Angelique, The Imaginary Invalid, all Playhouse Theatre, Eagles Mere, Pennsylvania, 1954.
- Olivia, Twelfth Night, Jan Hus Playhouse, New York City, 1954.
- Princess Charlotte, The First Gentleman, Belasco Theatre, New York City, 1957.
- Madge, Picnic, and Amy Kittridge, A Swim in the Sea, both Royal Poinciana Playhouse, Palm Beach, FL, 1958.
- Ophelia, Hamlet, Helena, A Midsummer Night's Dream, and Perdita, The Winter's Tale, all American Shakespeare Festival, Stratford, CT, 1958.
- Amy Kittridge, A Swim in the Sea, Walnut Street Theatre, Philadelphia, PA, 1958.
- Juliet, Romeo and Juliet, American Shakespeare Festival, 1959.
- Solveig, Peer Gynt, Phoenix Theatre, New York City, 1960.
- Julie Jordan, Carousel, Melody Top Theatre, Hillside, IL, 1962.
- Gillian, Bell, Book, and Candle, Kiamesha Playhouse, Kiamesha Lake, New York, 1962.
- Desdemona, Othello, Arena Stage, Washington, DC, 1963.
- Magnolia, Show Boat, Kenley Players, Warren, OH, then Columbus, OH, both 1963.
- Lizzie Currie, 110 in the Shade, Broadhurst Theatre, New York City, 1963.
- Irene Adler, Baker Street, Broadway Theatre, New York City, 1965.
- title role, Mary Stuart, Parker Playhouse, Ft. Lauderdale, FL, 1967.
- Eliza Doolittle, My Fair Lady, City Center Light Opera Company, City center theater, New York City, 1968.
- Lady Alice More, A Man for All Seasons, Center Theatre Group, Ahmanson Theatre, Los Angeles, 1979.
- The Crucible, Center Theatre Group, Ahmanson Theatre, 1972
- The Four Poster, New Stage Theatre, Jackson, MS, 1979.

=== Major theatrical tours ===
- Marie Louise, My Three Angels, U.S. cities, 1957.
- Julie Jordan, Carousel, U.S. cities, 1960.
- Lizzie Currie, 110 in the Shade, U.S. cities, 1963

== Movie credits ==
- Ellen Anderson, Advise & Consent, Columbia, 1962
- Kate Keller, The Miracle Worker, United Artists, 1962
- Sister Monica, Lipstick, Paramount, 1976
- Mrs. Craddock, The Betsy, Allied Artists, 1978
- Singer, The Mountain Men, Columbia, 1980

== Television credits ==
Television debut – Singer, Chrysler Special, CBC (Canadian television), 1957.

=== Television series ===
- Gretchen Kraus, Benson, ABC, 1979–86.

=== Television mini-series ===
- Amelia Foster, Testimony of Two Men, syndicated, 1977.
- Maude Hazard, North and South, ABC, 1985.
- Maude Hazard, North and South, Book II, ABC, 1986.
- Marilyn Bradshaw Reagan, Nutcracker: Money, Madness, and Murder, NBC, 1987.

=== Television episodes ===
- Liza, "The Best Wine", Goodyear Playhouse, NBC, 1957
- Marjorie, "The World of Nick Adams", The Seven Lively Arts, CBS, 1957
- Maria, "Heart of Darkness", Playhouse 90, CBS, 1958
- Milly Theale, "Wings of the Dove", Playhouse 90, CBS, 1958
- Vera, "Goodbye, But It Doesn't Go Away", The United States Steel Hour, CBS, 1958
- Rose Maylie, "Oliver Twist", DuPont Show of the Month, CBS, 1959
- Lady Jane, "Victoria Regina", Hallmark Hall of Fame, NBC, 1961
- Inger Borgstrom Cartwright, "Inger, My Love" and "Journey Remembered", Bonanza, NBC, 1962
- Barbara Paige, “Eye For An Eye”,‘’The Rookies’’, ABC, 1975
- Henrietta Higgins, "The Sod House Woman", Sara, CBS, 1976
- Marie Barrett, "Hitchhike To Terror", Barnaby Jones, CBS, 1978
- Ingrid Svenson, Soap, ABC, 1978–79
- Helen's mother, "Sex & Violence" (unaired), Highcliffe Manor, NBC, 1979
- Sonya Green, "Till Death Do Us Part", Hotel, ABC, 1988
- Holly Lindstrom, "Little Sister", The Golden Girls, NBC, 1989
- Madelyn Stone, "George and the Old Maid", Newhart, CBS, 1989.

=== Other television ===
- The Defenders, CBS, 1961 and 1962
- Dr. Kildare, NBC, 1962
- The Nurses, CBS, 1963
- American Musical Theatre, CBS, 1964
- The Tonight Show, NBC, 1964
- My Father and My Mother, CBS Playhouse, CBS, 1968
- Medical Center, CBS, 1970 and 1971
- The Tape Recorder, NET Playhouse, PBS, 1970

=== Television movies ===
- Ilyana Kovalefskii, Earth II, ABC, 1971.
- Nora Bayes, Ziegfeld: The Man and His Women, NBC, 1978.
- Matty Kline, Bay Cove, NBC, 1987.

=== Television specials ===
- Kate, The Gay Deceivers, CBC, 1958.
- Lavinia, Androcles and the Lion, NBC, 1967.
- Mrs. Trimble, My Dear Uncle Sherlock, ABC Short Story Specials, ABC, 1977.
- Mrs. Marston, The Terrible Secret, ABC Afterschool Special, ABC, 1979.
