= The Odd Couple (play) =

1965 stage play by Neil Simon

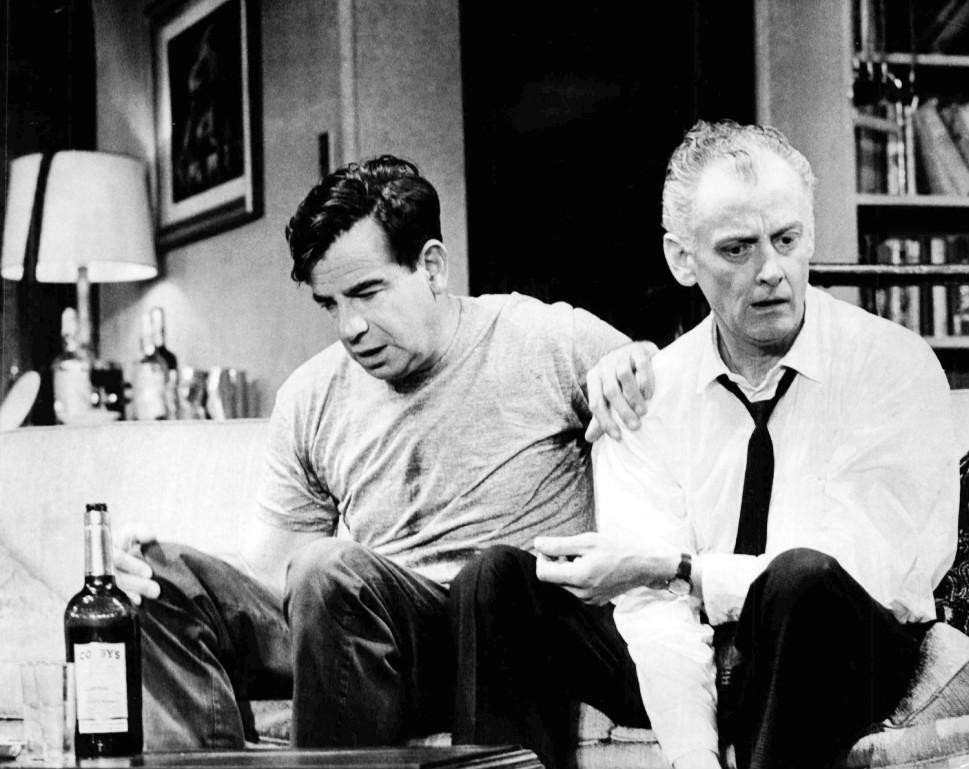
- Walter Matthau and Art Carney in the 1965 production
- Original language: English
- Written by: Neil Simon
- Genre: Comedy
- Setting: An apartment on Riverside Drive, New York City.

Premiere
- Date: 1965
- Place: United States

The Odd Couple is a play by Neil Simon. Following its premiere on Broadway in 1965, the characters were revived in a successful 1968 film and 1970s television series, as well as several other derivative works and spin-offs. The plot concerns two mismatched roommates: the neat, uptight Felix Ungar and the slovenly, easygoing Oscar Madison. Simon adapted the play in 1985 to feature a pair of female roommates (Florence Ungar and Olive Madison) in The Female Odd Couple. An updated version of the 1965 show appeared in 2002 with the title Oscar and Felix: A New Look at the Odd Couple.

== History ==
Sources vary as to the origins of the play. In The Washington Post's obituary of Simon's brother Danny, a television writer, Adam Bernstein wrote that the idea for the play came from his divorce. "Mr. Simon had moved in with a newly single theatrical agent named Roy Gerber in Hollywood, and they invited friends over one night. Mr. Simon botched the pot roast. The next day, Gerber told him: 'Sweetheart, that was a lovely dinner last night. What are we going to have tonight?' Mr. Simon replied: 'What do you mean, cook you dinner? You never take me out to dinner. You never bring me flowers.'" Danny Simon wrote a partial first draft of the play, but then handed over the idea to Neil.

However, in the Mel Brooks biography It's Good to Be the King, author James Robert Parish claims that the play came about after Simon observed Brooks, in a separation from his first wife, living with writer Speed Vogel for three months. Vogel later wrote that Brooks had insomnia, "a brushstroke of paranoia", and "a blood-sugar problem that kept us a scintilla away from insanity".

=== Boston tryout ===
Simon credited Boston critic Elliot Norton with helping him develop the final act of the play. Norton practiced drama criticism when the relationship between the regional critic and playwrights whose shows were undergoing tryouts in their towns were not as adversarial as they were to become.

Appearing on the public television show Elliot Norton Reviews, during Simon's conversation with the critic, Norton said that the play went "flat" in its final act. As it appeared originally at Boston's Colonial Theatre, the characters the Pigeon Sisters did not appear in the final act.

Simon told The Boston Globe:

He invited one of the stars and the writer. He loved the play and gave it a wonderful review but he said the third act was lacking something. On the show he said, 'You know who I missed in the third act was the Pigeon Sisters,' and it was like a light bulb went off in my head. It made an enormous difference in the play. I rewrote it and it worked very well. I was so grateful to Elliot ... Elliot had such a keen eye. I don't know if he saved the play or not, but he made it a bigger success.

== Plot overview ==
Felix Ungar, a neurotic, neat freak news writer (a photographer in the television series), is thrown out by his wife, and his friend Oscar Madison, a slovenly sportswriter, offers him the opportunity to move in with him, as he fears Felix may kill himself over his marital issues. Despite Oscar's problems – careless spending, excessive gambling, a poorly kept house filled with spoiled food – he seems to enjoy life. Felix, however, seems utterly incapable of enjoying anything and only finds purpose in pointing out his own and other people's mistakes and foibles. Even when he tries to do so in a gentle and constructive way, his corrections and suggestions prove extremely annoying to those around him, eventually breaking up the ritual weekly poker game with friends. Oscar, his closest friend, feels compelled to throw him out after only a brief time together, though he quickly realizes that Felix has had a positive effect on him, leading to the play ending with their friendship restored, though they will live in separate spaces.

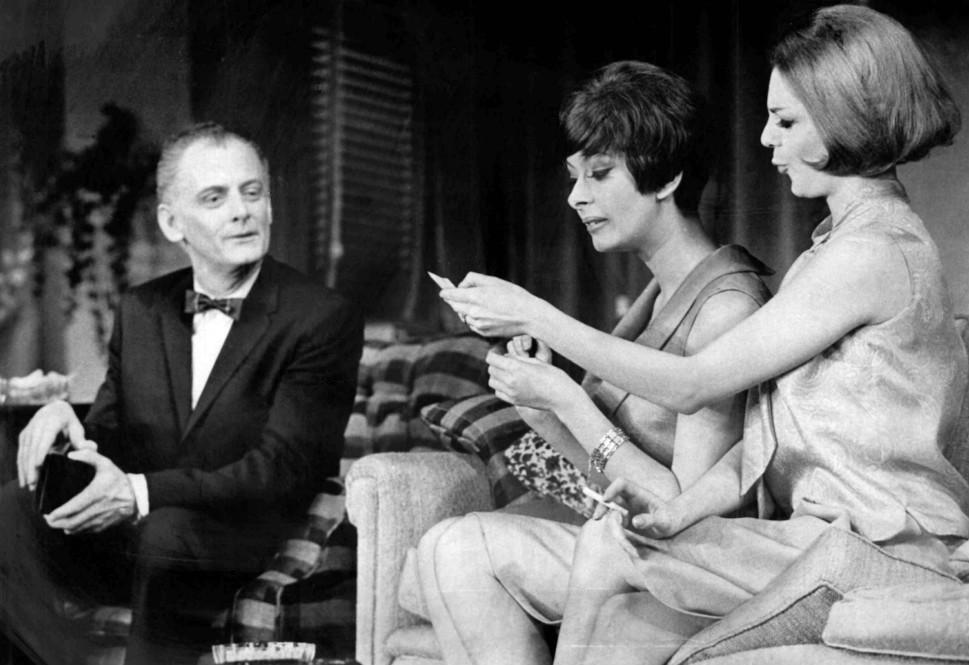
Felix and the Pigeon Sisters.

== Characters ==
- Felix Ungar: A fastidious, hypochondriac news writer whose marriage is ending. The play and the film both spell Felix's name Ungar, while the television series spells it Unger.
- Oscar Madison: A slovenly, recently divorced sportswriter and Felix's best friend.
- Murray: A NYPD policeman, one of Felix's and Oscar's poker buddies.
- Speed: One of the poker buddies. Gruff and sarcastic, often picking on Vinnie and Murray.
- Vinnie: One of the poker buddies. Vinnie is mild-mannered and henpecked, making him an easy target for Speed's verbal barbs.
- Roy: One of the poker buddies. Oscar's accountant. Roy has a dry wit but is less acerbic than Speed.
- Cecily and Gwendolyn Pigeon: Felix and Oscar's giggly upstairs neighbors, a pair of English sisters. Cecily is a divorcée, and Gwendolyn a widow.

== Productions ==
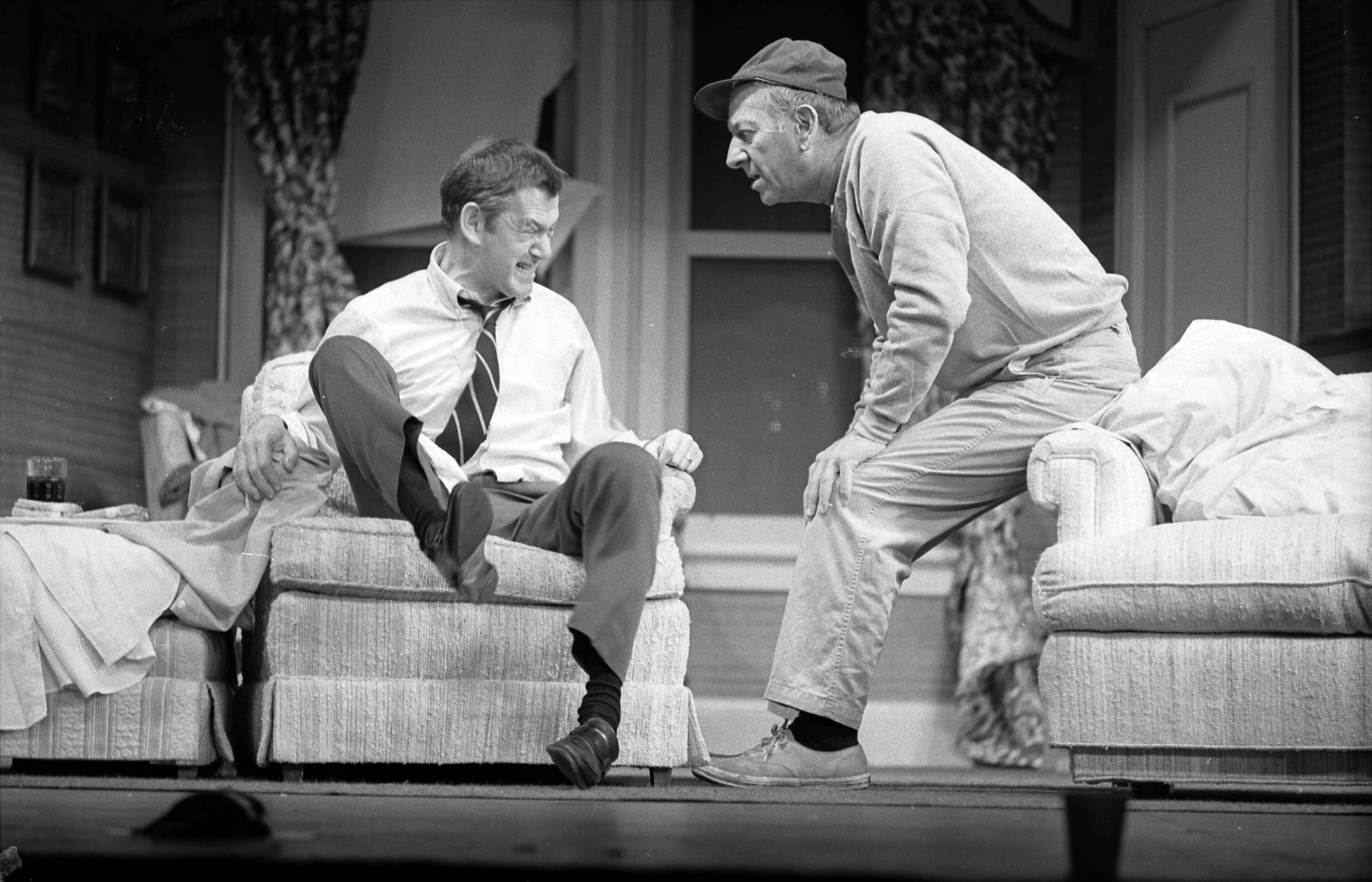
Tony Randall (left) and Jack Klugman performing the play, 1975

The Odd Couple premiered on Broadway at the Plymouth Theatre on March 10, 1965, and transferred to the Eugene O'Neill Theatre where it closed on July 2, 1967, after 964 performances and two previews. Directed by Mike Nichols, the cast starred Walter Matthau as Oscar Madison and Art Carney as Felix Ungar. The production gained Tony Awards for Walter Matthau, Best Actor (Play), Best Author (Play), Best Direction of a Play, and Best Scenic Design (Oliver Smith), and was nominated for Best Play.

Matthau was replaced with Jack Klugman in November 1965, and then Pat Hingle in February 1966. Carney was replaced with Eddie Bracken in October 1965 and later Paul Dooley.

=== Stage revivals ===
In 1968, James Wheaton directed an all black version of the show at the Ebony Showcase Theatre in Los Angeles. The production starred Nick Stewart and Morris Erby. The cast also included Larry McCormick in his acting debut.

In 1970, the McMaster Shakespearean Players performed The Odd Couple with Martin Short as Felix, Eugene Levy as Oscar, and Dave Thomas as Murray; all three actors would later find fame as cast members of SCTV.

In 1989, Ronald Harwood directed a production at the Royal Exchange, Manchester, with Derek Griffiths as Oscar and Sam Kelly as Felix.

In 1994, a version of the play moved to The Kings Theatre, Glasgow and toured Scotland, starring Gerard Kelly as Felix, Craig Ferguson as Oscar and Kate Anthony as Gwendolyn Pigeon. Kelly reprised the role of Felix at the 2002 Edinburgh Fringe, opposite Andy Gray.

In 1996, Klugman and Tony Randall reprised their roles from the TV series for a three-month run at the Theatre Royal in Haymarket, London. The production was an effort to raise money to support Randall's National Actors Theatre. (Klugman had previously played Oscar in London opposite Victor Spinetti as Felix.)

In a 1997 issue of Premiere magazine, Billy Crystal and Robin Williams announced a possible stage revival, in anticipation of success of their film Fathers' Day (1997). When that film failed at the box office, the Crystal–Williams revival was abandoned.

Also in 1997, a tour of the US and Canada was mounted by Troupe America and Lake Pepin Players featuring former costars of the TV series M*A*S*H, Jamie Farr as Oscar, William Christopher as Felix, along with William Richard Rogers as Murray. The production was directed by Curt Wollan.

In 2001, Wheel of Fortune host Pat Sajak and Hawaii TV news anchor Joe Moore (Sajak's Vietnam roommate and close friend) played Felix and Oscar at the Hawaii Theatre Center as a benefit for Hawaii's Manoa Valley Theater.

In 2002, Simon wrote an updated version of The Odd Couple, titled Oscar and Felix: A New Look at the Odd Couple. This version incorporated updated references and elements into the original storyline. This production ran at the Geffen Playhouse (Los Angeles) from June 2002 to July 21, 2002, with a cast that starred Gregory Jbara (Vinnie), John Larroquette (Oscar), Joe Regalbuto (Felix) and María Conchita Alonso (Ynes) and was directed by Peter Bonerz.

A revival of the original version opened on Broadway at The Brooks Atkinson Theatre on October 27, 2005, and closed on June 4, 2006, after 249 performances. Matthew Broderick and Nathan Lane played Felix and Oscar, respectively. Due to illness, Lane was replaced for three performances in January 2006 by Brad Garrett, who played Murray earlier in the same production.

In August 2005, British comedians Bill Bailey and Alan Davies played Oscar and Felix at the Edinburgh Fringe Festival directed by Guy Masterson which was the hit of the festival.

A reading featuring Ethan Hawke and Billy Crudup was staged at the Cherry Lane Theatre on January 9, 2011.

A Venezuelan production appeared at the Trasnocho Cultural Theater in 2009. It was directed by Armando Alvarez and featured Armando Cabrera (Oscar), Luigi Sciamanna (Felix), Juan Carlos Ogando (Richard), Alezander Slorzano (Murray), Alexandra Malave (Clementina), and Stephanie Cardone (Cecilia).

The all-female Takarazuka Revue Company performed the show under the title Okashi-na Futari (おかしな二人) in September 2011 in Takarazuka, Japan. It starred Yu Todoroki as Oscar and Misa Noeru as Felix.

In 2011, Cezary Żak and Artur Barciś (popular actors from the Polish hit TV series Ranczo) performed as Oscar and Felix in Dziwna Para, a Polish rendition of The Odd Couple. The play was performed in the U.S and in Toronto, Canada, and received good reviews.

In 2016, Australian comedians Shaun Micallef and Francis Greenslade starred as Felix Ungar and Oscar Madison in a version of the play directed by Peter Houghton. The play was performed at Southbank Theatre, Melbourne from November 5 to December 22, 2016, and received positive reviews.

In 2024, the play was then staged in Bavarian dialect by the Chiemgauer Theatergroup of the GTEV D’Bachecker Hirnsberg-Pietzing. Directed by Uwe Drahtschmidt, the production featured Matthias Jehl as Oskar and Matthias Haupt as Felix in the leading roles.

In 2027, the play will be revived at Broadway's Stephen Sondheim Theatre in a production directed by Thomas Kail and starring Steve Carell and John C. Reilly; the cast will also feature Laura Benanti, James Monroe Iglehart, and Rob McClure, among others. Performances are scheduled to begin on March 3 ahead of March 23 opening night.

== Female version ==
In 1985, Neil Simon revised The Odd Couple for a female cast. The Female Odd Couple was based on the same story line and same lead characters, now called Florence Ungar and Olive Madison. Now set in the 1980s, the poker game became Trivial Pursuit with their friends becoming the girlfriends: Mikey, Sylvie, Vera, and Renee. The English-born Pigeon sisters became the Spanish-born Costazuela brothers, Manolo and Jesus.

The Female Odd Couple opened on Broadway at the Broadhurst Theatre on June 11, 1985, and closed on February 23, 1986, after 295 performances and nine previews. Directed by Gene Saks, responsible for the 1968 film version, the leads were Sally Struthers as Florence (Felix) and Rita Moreno as Olive (Oscar), respectively, with Lewis J. Stadlen and Tony Shalhoub (in his Broadway debut) as the Costazuela brothers. Moreno was later replaced by Brenda Vaccaro. Struthers indicated on Gilbert Gottfried's Amazing Colossal Podcast that Moreno was very difficult to work with.

A London production of this version ran at the Apollo Theatre in 2001 and starred Paula Wilcox (Florence) and Jenny Seagrove (Olive).

Translated into Spanish as La extraña pareja, the female version opened in Madrid in 2017. It was directed by Andrés Rus and the lead roles were played by Susana Hernáiz (Olga/Olive) and Elda García (Flora/Florence).

== Film and TV adaptations ==
Neil Simon sold film and TV rights to Paramount Pictures in 1967. Paramount produced two theatrical films, three live-action TV series and an animated series based upon the play.

=== 1968 film ===
In 1968, The Odd Couple was made into a highly successful film starring Jack Lemmon as Felix and Walter Matthau reprising his role from the play. Much of the script from the play is the same, although the setting is expanded: instead of taking place entirely in Oscar's apartment, some scenes take place at various locations in New York. The film was also written by Simon (who was nominated for an Academy Award) and was directed by Gene Saks.

30 years later, Lemmon and Matthau reprised their roles as Felix and Oscar for the film sequel The Odd Couple II (1998), produced by Neil Simon.

=== 1970–1975 ABC sitcom ===
The success of the film was the basis for the 1970–1975 ABC television sitcom, starring Tony Randall as Felix and Jack Klugman as Oscar. Klugman was familiar with the role as he had replaced Walter Matthau in the original Broadway run. Neil Simon originally disapproved of this adaptation, but by the series' final season, he reassessed the show positively to the point of appearing in a cameo role.

Randall and Klugman also reunited in 1993 for a made-for-TV reunion film based upon the series, The Odd Couple Together Again. The movie was initially broadcast on CBS on September 24, 1993. Robert Klane was the writer and director, with a cast that included Barbara Barrie as Felix's wife, Penny Marshall as Myrna and Dick Van Patten. Jack Klugman's real-life throat-cancer surgery was written into the script, when Felix (Tony Randall) stays with Oscar and helps with his rehabilitation.

=== 1975 ABC cartoon ===
In the fall of 1975, ABC aired a cartoon version of the play entitled The Oddball Couple, produced by Paramount and DePatie-Freleng Enterprises. The roles were played by a neat cat named Spiffy and a sloppy dog named Fleabag. Unlike every live-action incarnation of Neil Simon's work, the pair's jobs were reversed. The neat cat was a writer, while the sloppy dog was a photographer.

=== 1982–1983 ABC sitcom ===
In 1982, ABC aired a new version of the series, entitled The New Odd Couple. Produced by Garry Marshall, the premise of the new version has two black actors, Ron Glass as Felix and Demond Wilson as Oscar. Several scripts were recycled from the original series. The New York Times reviewer noted: "What may be surprising is how little the spine of the show has changed. The dialogue has been updated a little, but the plots are essentially the same. The New Odd Couple bounces along nicely. It adds nothing new to the craft of situation comedy, but it does provide employment and a good showcase for talented black actors, who generally don't have an easy time of it on television these days." This new version was not successful and was canceled after just 13 episodes.

=== 2015 CBS sitcom ===
Another adaptation, again called The Odd Couple, was a multi-camera comedy that ran for three seasons on CBS from 2015 to 2017. The series starred Matthew Perry as Oscar and Thomas Lennon as Felix; it was a pet project for Perry, who also served as the show's co-developer, co-executive producer and co-writer. The show also featured Wendell Pierce as Teddy, Oscar's agent; Yvette Nicole Brown as Dani, Oscar's assistant; Dave Foley as Roy (a holdover from the original play); and Leslie Bibb and Lindsay Sloane as Casey and Emily (taking over for the Pigeon sisters).

== Awards and nominations ==
=== Original Broadway production ===
Year	Award	Category	Nominee	Result
1965	Tony Award	Best Play		Nominated
1965	Tony Award	Best Actor in a Play	Walter Matthau	Won
1965	Tony Award	Best Scenic Design	Oliver Smith	Won
1965	Tony Award	Best Direction of a Play	Mike Nichols	Won
1965	Tony Award	Best Author	Neil Simon	Won
