= Half a Sixpence =

Musical

- Official Broadway Cast recording cover art
- Music: David Heneker
- Lyrics: David Heneker
- Book: Beverley Cross
- Basis: Kipps by H. G. Wells
- Productions: 1963 West End; 1965 Broadway; 1967 Film adaptation 2008 UK Tour; 2016 West End revival

Half a Sixpence is a 1963 musical comedy based on the 1905 novel Kipps by H. G. Wells, with music and lyrics by David Heneker and a book by Beverley Cross. It was written as a vehicle for British pop star Tommy Steele.

== Background ==
The show is based on H. G. Wells's 1905 novel Kipps: The Story of a Simple Soul. Steele played Arthur Kipps, an orphan who unexpectedly inherits a fortune, and climbs the social ladder before losing everything and realising that you just can't buy happiness.

David Heneker (who had also worked on Irma La Douce and Charlie Girl) wrote both music and lyrics. Steele's importance to the show was made evident by his appearance in twelve of the musical's fifteen songs. Much of this musical was tailored as a star vehicle for Steele's particular talents. This was especially evident in the musical number "Money to Burn": when Arthur Kipps realises that he is about to become wealthy, he decides that the first thing he will buy is a banjo. This is the cue for someone to hand Tommy Steele a banjo so that he can demonstrate his skill on the instrument. In the source material – Wells's novel – one of the first things that Arthur Kipps purchases with his newfound wealth is a banjo.

John Cleese of later Monty Python fame had a small role in the initial cast as James Walshingham.

== Productions ==
=== London ===
Half a Sixpence was first produced in London's West End at the Cambridge Theatre on 21 March 1963, with Marti Webb, in her first leading role, playing Ann. Anna Barry also appeared as Helen. The production was directed by John Dexter, with choreography by Edmund Balin, and the set was designed by Loudon Sainthill. It ran for 677 performances.

=== Film version ===
A 1967 film adaptation starring Steele, along with Julia Foster and Cyril Ritchard, was directed by George Sidney and choreographed by Gillian Lynne. Lesley Judd, a future presenter of the BBC children's TV series Blue Peter, was one of the dancing chorus. Foster's singing voice was dubbed by Marti Webb.

=== 2016 revised version ===
A revised version of the show opened at the Chichester Festival Theatre in July 2016, co-produced by Cameron Mackintosh. Reuniting Mackintosh's Mary Poppins collaborators, the show features a new book by Julian Fellowes and new songs by George Stiles and Anthony Drewe alongside revisions of Heneker's originals.

Following the success in Chichester, the production transferred to the Noël Coward Theatre in London's West End on 17 November 2016 with previews from 29 October 2016. It initially booked until 11 February 2017. Due to five-star reviews and audience acclaim, the show was extended until 22 April 2017. It was extended, once again, until 6 May 2017. It extended again until 2 September 2017, when it closed.

== Synopsis ==
The musical tells the tale of the changing fortunes of Arthur Kipps, an orphan and draper's assistant at Shalford's Bazaar in Folkestone, Kent at the turn of the twentieth century. Kipps is an easy-going working class lad, who is happiest with his banjo. He falls in love with Ann Pornick, who gives him the titular gift of half a sixpence as a token of their love. However, when he unexpectedly inherits a fortune from an estranged grandfather, he is suddenly propelled into high society. He catches the eye of Helen Walsingham and her money-grabbing family, who are desperate to restore their family fortune. When he loses his money (thanks to the fraudulent behavior of Helen's brother, James), Kipps is reminded of his roots and returns to marry Ann.

== Songs ==
Act I

- "All in The Cause of Economy" – Arthur Kipps, Sid Pornick, Buggins and Pearce
- "Half a Sixpence" – Arthur Kipps and Ann Pornick
- "Money to Burn" – Arthur Kipps, Laura and The Men
- "A Proper Gentleman" – Arthur Kipps, Sid Pornick, Buggins, Pearce and Shopgirls
- "She's Too Far Above Me" – Arthur Kipps
- "If The Rain's Got to Fall" – Arthur Kipps, Pearce, Sid Pornick, Buggins, Shopgirls, Singers and Dancers
- "The Old Military Canal" – Singers

Act II

- "A Proper Gentleman" (Reprise) – Arthur Kipps, Mrs. Walsingham, Helen Walsingham, Mrs. Botting, Young Walsingham and Party Guests
- "The One That's Run Away" – Chitterlow & Kipps
- "Long Ago" – Arthur Kipps and Ann Pornick
- "Flash Bang Wallop" – Arthur Kipps, Ann Pornick, Chitterlow, Mr. Shalford, Pearce, Sid Pornick, Buggins, Shopgirls and Singers
- "I Know What I Am" – Ann Pornick
- "The Party's on the House" – Arthur Kipps, Pearce, Sid Pornick, Buggins, Shopgirls, Singers and Dancers
- "Half a Sixpence" (Reprise) – Arthur Kipps and Ann Pornick
- "All in the Cause of Economy" (Reprise) – Flo, Pearce, Sid Pornick and Buggins
- "Finale" – Entire Company

=== 2016 West End Production ===
Act I

- "Half a Sixpence" – Arthur Kipps and Ann Pornick
- "Look Alive" – Company
- "Money to Burn" – Arthur Kipps, Mr Shalford, Sid Pornick, Buggins, Pierce and Flo Evan's
- "Believe in Yourself" – Arthur Kipps and Helen Walsingham
- "She's Too Far Above Me" – Arthur Kipps
- "Money to Burn" (Reprise) – Arthur Kipps and Ann Pornick
- "A Proper Gentleman" – Arthur Kipps, Sid Pornick, Buggins, Pearce and Flo Evans
- "Half a Sixpence" (Reprise) – Arthur Kipps and Ann Pornick
- "Long Ago" – Ann Pornick
- "Back the Right Horse" – Chitterlow and Company
- "Just a Few Little Things" – Helen Walsingham and Arthur Kipps
- "A Little Touch of Happiness" – Ann Pornick and Flo
- "If The Rain's Got to Fall" – Mrs Walsingham, Lady Punnet, Arthur Kipps, Helen Walsingham, James Walsingham and Ensemble

Act II

- "The One That's Run Away" – Chitterlow & Arthur Kipps
- "Pick Out a Simple Tune" – Arthur Kipps, Lady Punnet and Ensemble
- "You Never Get Anything Right / I Know Who I Am" – Arthur Kipps and Ann Pornick
- "We'll Build a Palace / I Only Want a Little House" – Arthur Kipps, Helen Walsingham, Mrs Walsingham, James Walsingham, Lady Punnet
- "In the Middle There's Me" – Arthur Kipps, Buggins, Sid Pornick and Pierce
- "Long Ago" (Reprise) – Arthur Kipps and Ann Pornick
- "Flash Bang Wallop" – Arthur Kipps, Ann Pornick, Mr. Shalford, Pearce, Sid Pornick, Buggins, Flo, Photographer and Company
- "Flash Bang Wallop" (Reprise)- Chitterlow, Arthur Kipps, Ann Pornick, Mr. Shalford, Pearce, Sid Pornick, Buggins, Flo, Photographer and Company
- "Finale" – Company

== Awards and nominations ==
=== Broadway production ===
Year	Award	Category	Nominee	Result
1965	Tony Award	Best Musical		Nominated
1965	Tony Award	Best Producer	Allen-Hodgdon, Stevens Productions Inc. and Harold Fielding	Nominated
1965	Tony Award	Best Performance by a Leading Actor in a Musical	Tommy Steele	Nominated
1965	Tony Award	Best Performance by a Featured Actor in a Musical	James Grout	Nominated
1965	Tony Award	Best Performance by a Featured Actress in a Musical	Carrie Nye	Nominated
1965	Tony Award	Best Author	Beverley Cross	Nominated
1965	Tony Award	Best Original Score	David Heneker	Nominated
1965	Tony Award	Best Direction of a Musical	Gene Saks	Nominated
1965	Tony Award	Best Choreography	Onna White	Nominated

=== 2016 West End revival ===
Year	Award	Category	Nominee	Result
2017	Whatsonstage.com Awards	Best New Musical		Nominated
2017	Whatsonstage.com Awards	Best Actor in a Musical	Charlie Stemp	Won
2017	Whatsonstage.com Awards	Best Actress in a Musical	Devon-Elise Johnson	Nominated
2017	Whatsonstage.com Awards	Best Supporting Actor in a Musical	Ian Bartholomew	Nominated
2017	Whatsonstage.com Awards	Best Supporting Actress in a Musical	Emma Williams	Won
2017	Whatsonstage.com Awards	Best Direction	Rachel Kavanaugh	Nominated
2017	Whatsonstage.com Awards	Best Choreography	Andrew Wright	Won
2017	Whatsonstage.com Awards	Best Costume Design	Paul Brown	Nominated
2017	Laurence Olivier Awards	Best Actor in a Musical	Charlie Stemp	Nominated
2017	Laurence Olivier Awards	Best Actor in Supporting Role in a Musical	Ian Bartholomew	Nominated
2017	Laurence Olivier Awards	Best Actress in Supporting Role in a Musical	Emma Williams	Nominated

== Recordings ==
- Half a Sixpence: An Original Cast Recording – Decca SLK4521 (1963)
- Half a Sixpence: The Original Broadway Cast Recording – RCA Victor LOC1110 (1965)
- Half a Sixpence: The Original 1962 Demo Recordings – Stage Door STAGE9052 (2017)
