= Tiny Alice =

1964 play written by Edward Albee

- Original language: English
- Written by: Edward Albee

Premiere
- Date: 1964
- Place: Broadway at the Billy Rose Theatre

Tiny Alice is a three-act play written by Edward Albee that premiered on Broadway at the Billy Rose Theatre in 1964.

== Synopsis ==
Powerful widow Miss Alice and her lawyer offer a generous grant to the church on the condition that the cardinal's naïve secretary be used as a liaison. The play is Edward Albee's look at the corruption involved in mixing religion and money. Julian is the lay brother who is sent to live with "Miss Alice".

Miss Alice, her lawyer, and her butler are "representatives of the unseen Tiny Alice, who resides in an altar-like 18-foot model of Miss Alice's baronial mansion."

== Productions ==
Tiny Alice premiered on Broadway at the Billy Rose Theatre on December 21, 1964, in previews, officially on December 29, 1964, and closed on May 22, 1965 after 8 previews and 167 performances. Directed by Alan Schneider, the cast featured John Gielgud as Julian, Irene Worth as Miss Alice, William Hutt as Lawyer, Eric Berry as Cardinal, and John Heffernan as Butler (Marian Seldes was the stand-by for Miss Alice). The gowns were by Mainbocher, sets by William Ritman, and lighting by Martin Aronstein.

The production was nominated for 1965 Tony Awards for Best Play, Best Actor in a Play (Gielgud), Best Actress in a Play (Worth), Best Direction of a Play (Alan Schneider), Best Producer of a Play (Theater 1965 - Richard Barr, Clinton Wilder), and Best Author (Play) (Albee). Irene Worth won the Tony Award.

The play ran at Hartford Stage, Connecticut, in May–June 1998, directed by Mark Lamos and starring Richard Thomas as Brother Julian. There were plans to move the production to Broadway with Lamos and Thomas, expected to open in February 1999, but that production did not happen.

The play was revived Off-Broadway at the Second Stage Theatre, from November 16, 2000, to January 7, 2001. Directed by Mark Lamos, the cast featured Richard Thomas (Brother Julian), Laila Robins (Miss Alice), John Michael Higgins (the Butler), Tom Lacy (the Cardinal), and Stephen Rowe (the Lawyer). The production had been extended twice. This production won the 2001 Lucille Lortel Award, Outstanding Revival.

== Critical response ==
Anita Maria Stenz observed that the play "inquires into the role religion can play in forming a buffer between man and his confrontation with things as they are. ... The plot ... is a fantasy." She notes that there are many "different interpretations" of the play.

Ben Brantley, in his review of the Hartford Stage 1998 production, called the play "tightly constructed, elegantly written, and (most surprisingly) defiantly funny" and "enigmatic", with a plot that is "definitely off-putting."

The Playbill article on the 2000 production noted that there was "negative and puzzled critical response" to the play when it originally was produced. The 2000 production received a "strongly positive review in the New York Times." Other reviews were mixed, with Newsday’s Linda Winer and Time Out New York’s David Cote strongly recommending the production.

Author Philip Roth wrote a furious indictment of the play, stating: "The disaster of the play, however—its tediousness, its pretentiousness, its galling sophistication, its gratuitous and easy symbolizing, its ghastly pansy rhetoric and repartee—all of this can be traced to his own unwillingness or inability to put its real subject [male homosexuality] at the center of the action."

== Awards and nominations ==
=== Original Broadway production ===
Year	Award	Category	Nominee	Result
1965	Tony Award	Best Play		Nominated
1965	Tony Award	Best Actor in a Play	John Gielgud	Nominated
1965	Tony Award	Best Actress in a Play	Irene Worth	Won
1965	Tony Award	Best Direction of a Play	Alan Schneider	Nominated
1965	Tony Award	Best Author	Edward Albee	Nominated
1965	Tony Award	Best Producer	Theatre 1965, Richard Barr and Clinton Wilder	Nominated
