= I Remember Mama =

I Remember Mama may refer to:

- I Remember Mama (play), a 1944 play by John Van Druten, based on the Kathryn Forbes novel Mama's Bank Account
- I Remember Mama (film), a 1948 film based on the play
- I Remember Mama (musical), a 1979 musical based on the novel
