= Rosemary Rice =

American actress

- Born: 3 May 1925; Montclair, New Jersey
- Died: 14 August 2012 (aged 87)
- Occupation(s): Actress, Singer, Voice-over artist
- Notable work: Katrin Hansen in the television series, Mama
- Spouse: John B. Merrell
- Children: 2

Rosemary Rice (May 3, 1925 – August 14, 2012) was an American actress, singer, and voice-over artist. Rice was best known for her role as Katrin Hansen, the oldest daughter in the television series, Mama, which aired on CBS from 1949 to 1957. She provided the opening voice narration for Mama through her character.

== Biography ==
=== Personal life ===
Rice was born to Albert and Laura (née Rogers) Rice in Montclair, New Jersey, on May 3, 1925. She married John B. Merrell, July 3, 1954; the couple had two children.

=== Early career and Broadway ===
Rice's acting career began during junior high student in Montclair, when she was cast in her first Broadway production, later attending New York's Professional Children's School. She appeared in twelve plays and musicals on Broadway. Her Broadway credits included the 1943 production of The Naked Genius, a play written by Gypsy Rose Lee, as well as Dear Ruth and Junior Miss.

=== Radio ===
Rice's first radio appearance was on Grand Central Station. She enjoyed an active career in radio, appearing in mysteries, comedies and soap operas. Her best known role was as Betty Cooper in the Archie Andrews radio series. Other radio credits included Ma Perkins (as Laura), The Right to Happiness (as Susan Wakefield), CBS Radio Mystery Theater, NBC Playhouse, Calvacade of America, Playhouse 90, When a Girl Marries (as Kathy), My True Story, Westinghouse Studio One, Young Doctor Malone (as Jill), and Let's Pretend.

=== Mama ===
In 1949, CBS debuted Mama, an early, live television series adapted from "Mama's Bank Account", a book written by Kathryn Forbes. The series, which was set in San Francisco, California, in the early 20th century, centered on the life of a Norwegian American family. The show, which aired from 1949 to 1957, was originally broadcast live from a television studio located above the Oyster Bar in Manhattan's Grand Central Terminal.

Rice was cast as Katrin Hansen, the family's oldest daughter. Rice opened each episode by showing and narrating a family photo album with the television audience, always ending the scene with the phrase, "But most of all, I remember... Mama." Veteran actress Peggy Wood starred as her Katrin's mother, Marta Hansen. Judson Laire appeared as the father, Lars Hansen, while Dick Van Patten was cast as the younger brother, Nels, and Robin Morgan as the younger sister, Dagmar. Rice described the cast, which spent five days a week working together, as very close, explaining to the New York Times that she called Judson Laire "Papa" until he died in 1979.

Mama was filmed using kinescopes. Rice kept some kinescopes from the production, though most of the machines have been destroyed or thrown away, along with many of the Mama episodes. In 1985, Rice donated her kinescopes to the Museum of Broadcasting, now called the Paley Center for Media, for exhibition of surviving Mama episodes. She appeared at Mama reunions and fan gatherings throughout her life.

She continued to work in guest spots on series and television commercials. Additional television credits included roles or appearances on Kraft Television Theatre, The Mike Douglas Show, One Life to Live, Playhouse 90, Search for Tomorrow, The Edge of Night, and Dave Garroway.

=== Children's music ===
Additionally, Rice wrote, sung and narrated fifteen children's albums during her career. She released nine albums through Columbia Records and six albums on the RCA label. Rice won a Grammy Award for one of her albums from Columbia Records. Her album Learning America the Fun Way was part of Harmony Records' Hi-Fi Fun Series, which included coloring kits and cutouts with the recordings.

=== Commercial work ===
Rice also worked in several dozen radio and television commercials, both on camera and through voice-over work. She became a familiar voice to consumers of Clairol products by recording the ad slogan, "If I've only one life to live, let me live it as a blonde!" Her other campaigns included Johnson & Johnson. Her work in the advertising industry earned her three Clio Awards. She provided the voice for the Bell Telephone exhibit at the 1964 New York World's Fair in 1964 and 1965.

=== Audio books ===
Later in life, Rice recorded the books-on-tape narrations for Caedmon Audio. She provided the narration for more than twenty textbooks published by Allyn & Bacon of Boston. She narrated nine audio books for The American Girl Collection, a line of books which accompany the popular American Girl dolls.

== Awards ==
In addition to the Grammy Award for her children's album and the three Clio Awards, Rice also won one Emmy Award and three Peabody Awards.

== Later life ==
Rice was a longtime resident of New Canaan, Connecticut, before moving to nearby Stamford, where she died from a heart attack on August 14, 2012, aged 87.
