= NBC 60th Anniversary Celebration =

American television special

- Genre: Documentary
- Written by: Hildy Parks
- Directed by: Clark Jones
- Country of origin: United States

Production
- Executive producer: Alexander H. Cohen
- Producers: Hildy Parks; Martha Mason
- Production locations: 30 Rockefeller Plaza, New York City, New York
- Running time: 180 mins
- Production company: NBC Productions

Original release
- Network: NBC
- Release: May 12, 1986

NBC 60th Anniversary Celebration is an American television special that aired on NBC on May 12, 1986. The executive producer was Alexander H. Cohen and the writer and co-producer was Hildy Parks. The same team assembled such famous-faces TV specials as Night of 100 Stars. This celebration also marks the debut of the current peacock logo of NBC.

== Summary ==
The opening scene was staged in the corridors of corporate headquarters at 30 Rockefeller Plaza, where many NBC stars like Bob Hope, Milton Berle, Barbara Eden, Doris Roberts and four of the Huxtable kids from The Cosby Show arrive on the eighth floor via an elevator. They enter just in time to witness a perky musical number featuring dancers dressed as peacocks and NBC tour guides singing an opening theme titled Hey, Did You Know? within the lobbies of the building. The program quickly gets to a parade of NBC stars, introduced by longtime staff announcer Mel Brandt.

Logo used since 1986 during NBC60

The roster proceeds alphabetically from Steve Allen and Harry Anderson to Jane Wyatt and Robert Young. Conspicuously absent was Bill Cosby himself, whose sitcom was the main reason NBC was the top-rated network at the time.

The rest, for the most part, consists of clips from shows down through the years, loosely arranged around categories and themes. The main plot of the special features two of the child stars from The Cosby Show, Malcolm-Jamal Warner and Keshia Knight Pulliam, being given a tour of NBC's facilities in New York and in Burbank, California. Much hinges on the question of whether little Keshia will ever get to see Johnny Carson in person.

The entire special itself pays tribute to every one of NBC's genres from late-night to daytime programming, radio days, earlier entertainment, comedy, drama, sitcoms, specials, movies, sports, and news, just to name a few. In the end, Malcolm and Keshia meet up with Johnny Carson himself on a stage full of NBC's guest stars singing a closing version of the opening theme, Hey, Did You Know? As the camera pans outward to reveal all the stars on screen, a new, modified version of the NBC peacock logo is unveiled, this time with six feathers. This marks the first national appearance of the "current" NBC logo (as well as the NBC Productions logo with the current logo), although some local stations began using the new logo after its official debut (the logo was also teased in a trademark in 1985, and was originally designed in 1980).

== Cast ==
- Debbie Allen
- Steve Allen
- Fran Allison
- Harry Anderson
- Bea Arthur
- Gene Barry
- Milton Berle
- Tempestt Bledsoe
- Tom Brokaw
- Pierce Brosnan
- Raymond Burr
- Red Buttons
- Sid Caesar
- Macdonald Carey
- Johnny Carson
- Nell Carter
- John Chancellor
- Connie Chung
- Dick Clark
- Robert Conrad
- Robert Culp
- Ted Danson
- Don DeFore
- Angie Dickinson
- Hugh Downs
- Barbara Eden
- Ralph Edwards
- Nanette Fabray
- Kim Fields
- Michael J. Fox
- Arlene Francis
- Soleil Moon Frye
- Estelle Getty
- Marla Gibbs
- Melissa Gilbert
- George Gobel
- Lorne Greene
- Bryant Gumbel
- Deidre Hall
- Valerie Harper
- Julie Harris
- David Hasselhoff
- Ed Herlihy
- Bob Hope
- Don Johnson
- Perry King
- Jack Klugman
- Keshia Knight Pulliam
- Michael Landon
- Hope Lange
- Sabrina Le Beauf
- Jerry Lester
- Shari Lewis
- Hal Linden
- Norman Lloyd
- Shelley Long
- Gloria Loring
- Peter Marshall
- Dick Martin
- Rue McClanahan
- Ed McMahon
- Mitch Miller
- Edwin Newman
- Donald O'Connor
- Merlin Olsen
- Jack Paar
- Patti Page
- Bert Parks
- Jane Pauley
- George Peppard
- Rhea Perlman
- Sarah Purcell
- Charlotte Rae
- John Ratzenberger
- Gene Rayburn
- Martha Raye
- Carl Reiner
- Alfonso Ribeiro
- Joan Rivers
- Doris Roberts
- Dan Rowan
- Pat Sajak
- Ricky Schroder
- Doc Severinsen
- Paul Shaffer
- Dinah Shore
- Bob Smith
- Robert Stack
- Craig Stevens
- Mary Stuart
- Philip Michael Thomas
- Daniel J. Travanti
- Robert Vaughn
- Malcolm-Jamal Warner
- Betty White
- Jonathan Winters
- Jane Wyatt
- Robert Young
