= Ray Jessel =

Welsh songwriter, screenwriter, orchestrator, and musical theatre composer

- Jessel on America's Got Talent in 2014
- Born: Raymond Jessel; 16 October 1929; Cardiff, Wales
- Died: 17 July 2015 (aged 85); Studio City, California, U.S.
- Occupations: Singer, songwriter, composer, screenwriter
- Years active: 1955–2015

Raymond Jessel (16 October 1929 – 17 July 2015) was a Welsh songwriter, screenwriter, orchestrator, and musical theatre composer. Born in Cardiff, he moved to Canada in 1955 and started a career as an orchestrator and composer for CBC Radio and CBC Television. He met a Canadian pianist Marian Grudeff, who became his songwriting partner. He received five MAC Awards for "Original Song" and the 2004 Bistro Award. He was most recognised for his audition for America's Got Talent in 2014 in which he sang an original song about a transgender woman.

With little success in Toronto, Jessel and Grudeff moved to New York City where they made their first success with the Broadway musical, Baker Street, in 1964. Jessel contributed to The Dean Martin Show, The Carol Burnett Show, The Smothers Brothers Show, The Bob Newhart Show and others. In the 1970s and 1980s he was a writer and editor for numerous episodes of The Love Boat and Head of the Class, among other series, and co-wrote lyrics for I Remember Mama in 1979.

== Early life and career ==
Jessel was born and raised in Cardiff, where his family ran a clothing shop. His grandfather was one of the co-founders of the Orthodox Jewish synagogue in Cardiff, where Jessel had his bar mitzvah. He received a degree in music from the University of Wales. With a one-year scholarship for studying musical composition, he went to Paris and studied under Arthur Honegger. He moved to Canada with his family in 1955 at the age of 26. He started his career as an orchestrator and composer for CBC Radio and CBC Television. There he met his lifelong songwriting partner, Marian Grudeff, a Canadian pianist. Together they played active roles in orchestral and theatrical compositions. Among their first works were songs for the Toronto revue Spring Thaw.

Their major breakthrough came when producer Alexander H. Cohen signed them to write the songs for the 1964 Broadway musical Baker Street, about Sherlock Holmes. Their next score was for a new version of Hellzapoppin, based on the 1938 hit musical revue of the same name. This new musical was not a success, but its title song was recorded by Jimmy Durante and Louis Armstrong. He moved to Hollywood and made a successful career with musicals and sketches for The Dean Martin Show, The Carol Burnett Show, The Smothers Brothers Show, The Bob Newhart Show, Comedy Factory, and various John Denver specials. He was a story editor of the ABC comedy The Love Boat from 1977 to 1980, and writer and consultant of Head of the Class from 1986 to 1991. He wrote and produced the CBS TV series The Jacksons. He also co-wrote, with Martin Charnin, lyrics for I Remember Mama in 1979.

== Performing career and later years ==
In the 1990s, Jessel began to perform comedy songs at parties. He was persuaded by Michael Feinstein and Shelly Goldstein to perform his original song, Wanna Sing a Show Tune, with Feinstein. The song was recorded on Feinstein's album Live at the Algonquin. His first stage performance was at age 72. He performed at the Hollywood’s Gardenia Room in 2002 and developed his own cabaret act. He continued to perform cabaret until shortly before his death, appearing in June 2015 at the Adelaide Cabaret Festival in Australia.

He met Cynthia Thompson in 1980 and married her approximately ten years later. He wrote a number of songs with her. The most successful are "Whatever Happened to Melody?", which was recorded by Michael Feinstein (on Forever), David Campbell (in Yesterday Is Now), and by Masters of Harmony (on California Gold Rush); and "I'm All Right Now" on John Pizzarelli's CD New Standards. They wrote scripts and songs for the Shari Lewis' PBS show The Charlie Horse Music Pizza. He was a recipient of five MAC Awards for "Original Song", and the 2004 Bistro Award.

At age 84, he auditioned for America's Got Talent in 2014. He performed an original comic song, "What She's Got", about a man who discovers that his girlfriend whom "I just adore ... has much more than I had bargained for" ... a penis. The judges, the public and some publications loved it, and he qualified for the next round of the competition. The audition was viewed more than 100,000 times on YouTube overnight following his performance. Jessel did not perform on the show a second time, but the video was eventually restored to the America's Got Talent YouTube channel, where it has been viewed more than 15 million times.

On 17 July 2015, Jessel died of natural causes at his home in Studio City, California, aged 85.
