= Hitchy-Koo =

Hitchy-Koo is a 1912 American popular song and a series of musical revues, inspired by the song, staged on Broadway each year from 1917 through 1920 and on tour in 1922.

Described by Variety magazine as a "hit song of 1912", the song was composed by Lewis F. Muir and Maurice Abrahams with lyrics by L. Wolfe Gilbert. Historian Eve Golden stated that the song is "a popular standard from the second-wave of ragtime tunes". Ian Whitcomb wrote that it was one of the first American popular songs to influence musical taste and culture in the United Kingdom with the "invasion of American popular music" in 1912.

== History ==
First published and performed in 1912, "Hitchy-Koo" was a staple of the vaudeville repertoire in the 1910s and 1920s, enjoying popularity in both American and British theatres. The song was first recorded in 1912 for Columbia Records by the vaudeville comedy duo Collins & Harlan. Other vaudeville entertainers who performed the work included Fanny Brice. The song was first introduced to the United Kingdom by the American Ragtime Octette (ARO) at the Hippodrome in London in 1912. Instantly popular with UK audiences, it was the first ragtime song to achieve popularity with the British public and was instrumental in creating an audience for ragtime in the UK. The ARO recorded "Hitchy-Koo" for The Winner Records in 1912.

The song became the eponymous inspiration for the Hitchy-Koo series of musical revues staged on Broadway from 1917 through 1920; and was the only song repeated across the various iterations of that revue.

Musicologist Derek B. Scott stated that, "'Hitchy Koo!' was the forerunner of many nonsense songs of the twentieth century suspected of being indecently suggestive."

== Hitchy-Koo revues ==
There were 4 Hitchy-Koo revues produced by and starring Raymond Hitchcock that ran on Broadway:

- Hitchy-Koo of 1917, June 7, 1917 – December 15, 1917; with music by E. Ray Goetz and book and lyrics by Harry Grattan, Glen MacDonough and E. Ray Goetz
- Hitchy-Koo of 1918, June 6, 1918 – August 3, 1918; with music by Raymond Hubbell and book and lyrics by Glen MacDonough and E. Ray Goetz
- Hitchy-Koo of 1919, October 6, 1919 — November 22, 1919; with music and lyrics by Cole Porter
- Hitchy-Koo of 1920, October 19, 1920 – December 18, 1920; with music by Jerome Kern, book by Glen MacDonough and lyrics by Glen MacDonough and Anne Caldwell.

The Hitchy-Koo of 1922 began tryouts on October 10, 1922 at the Sam S. Shubert Theatre, Philadelphia, but ran for less than two weeks. The music and lyrics were by Cole Porter and the book was by Harold Atteridge. This was the last in the series and the only show not to play on Broadway, although it did tour the United States.

== Sources ==
- Stanley Appelbaum, ed. (1989). "Peg O' My Heart" and Other Favorite Song Hits, 1912 & 1913. Dover Publications. ISBN 9780486259987.
- Tim Brooks, Brian Rust (1999). The Columbia Master Book Discography: Principal U.S. matrix series. 1910-1924. Greenwood Press.
- Jack Burton, Graydon LaVerne Freeman, Larry Freeman (1962). The Blue Book of Tin Pan Alley: A Human Interest Encyclopedia of American Popular Music, Volume 2. Century House.
- Eve Golden (2007). "Everybody's Doing It". Vernon and Irene Castle's Ragtime Revolution. University Press of Kentucky. ISBN 9780813137605.
- Herbert G. Goldman (1993). Fanny Brice: The Original Funny Girl. Oxford University Press. ISBN 9780195359015.
- Stephen Inwood (2011). City of Cities: The Birth of Modern London. Pan Macmillan. ISBN 9780330540674.
- Colin Larkin (2006). "Maurice Abrahams". Encyclopedia of Popular Music. Vol. 1. Oxford University Press. ISBN 978-0-19-531373-4.
- Brian Rust, Sandy Forbes (1989). British Dance Bands on Record 1911 to 1945 and Supplement. General Gramophone Publications.
- Derek B. Scott (2017). "The Power of Music". Musical Style and Social Meaning: Selected Essays. Taylor & Francis. ISBN 9781351556873.
- Donald J. Stubblebine (2015). Early Broadway Sheet Music: A Comprehensive Listing of Published Music from Broadway and Other Stage Shows, 1843-1918. McFarland & Company. ISBN 9781476605609.
- Steven Suskin (2000). Show Tunes (3rd ed.). Oxford University Press. ISBN 0-19-512599-1.
- Ian Whitcomb (2013). After the Ball: Pop Music from Rag to Rock. Faber & Faber. ISBN 9780571299331.
