= The Blue Flame (play) =

1920 science fiction play

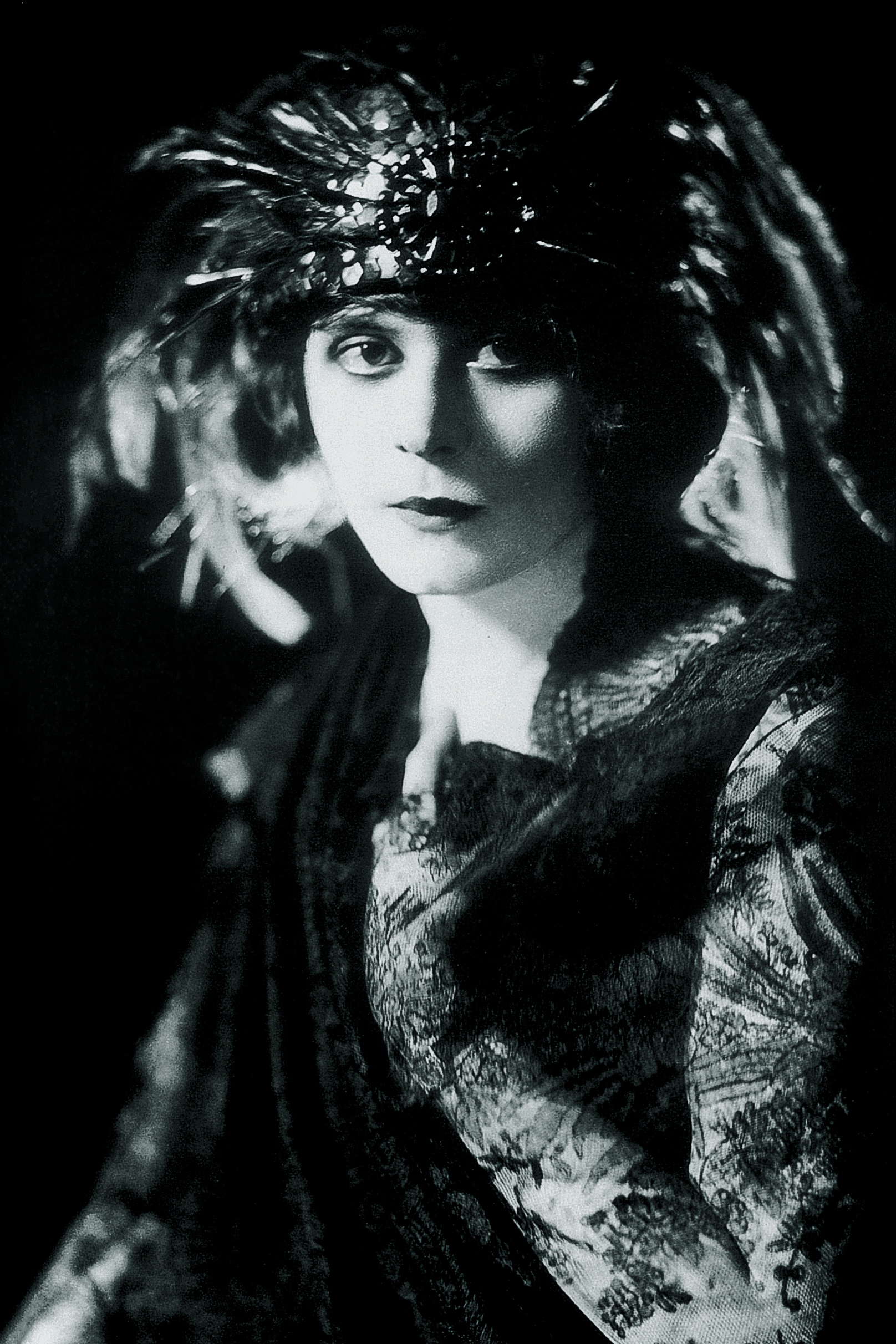
- Theda Bara as Ruth Gordon
- Original language: English
- Written by: George V. Hobart; John Willard; Leta Vance Nicholson
- Genre: Science fiction, Melodrama
- Setting: New York City

Premiere
- Date: March 15, 1920
- Place: Shubert Theatre

The Blue Flame is a four-act play written by George V. Hobart and John Willard, who revised an earlier version by Leta Vance Nicholson. In 1920, producer Albert H. Woods staged the play on Broadway and took it on tour across the United States. Ruth Gordon, the plays' main character, is a religious young woman who dies and is revived by her scientist fiancé as a soulless femme fatale. She seduces several men and involves them in crimes, including drug use and murder. In the final act, her death and resurrection are revealed to be a dream. The production starred Theda Bara, a popular silent film actress who was known for playing similar roles in movies.

Critics panned the play, ridiculing the plot, dialogue, and Bara's acting. Theater historian Ward Morehouse called it "one of the worst plays ever written". Bara's movie fame drew large crowds to theaters, and the play was a commercial success, breaking attendance records at some venues. Ruth Gordon was Bara's only Broadway role, and The Blue Flame was one of her last professional acting projects.

== Plot ==
In the first act, irreligious scientist John Varnum has developed a device to bring the recently dead back to life. His sweet, religious fiancée, Ruth Gordon, does not approve of his experiments and hopes to reform him. When she is struck by lightning and killed, she becomes the first person to be revived by his machine. Before she is reanimated, the audience sees her soul visibly leave her body as the "blue flame" of the title. With no soul, the revived Ruth has an entirely different personality. Upon waking, she asks John for a kiss, then suggests they marry immediately so they can begin having sex.

In the second and third acts, Ruth seduces a young man named Larry Winston and steals him away from his fiancée. She takes Larry to New York's Chinatown, where she gets him hooked on cocaine and steals an emerald from an idol. She meets another young man, Ned Maddox, whom she seduces and kills for insurance money, framing another man for the murder. In the final act, Ruth's death and revival is revealed to be a dream John was having. Upon waking he understands the importance of the soul; he embraces religion and destroys his life-restoration device.

== Cast and characters ==
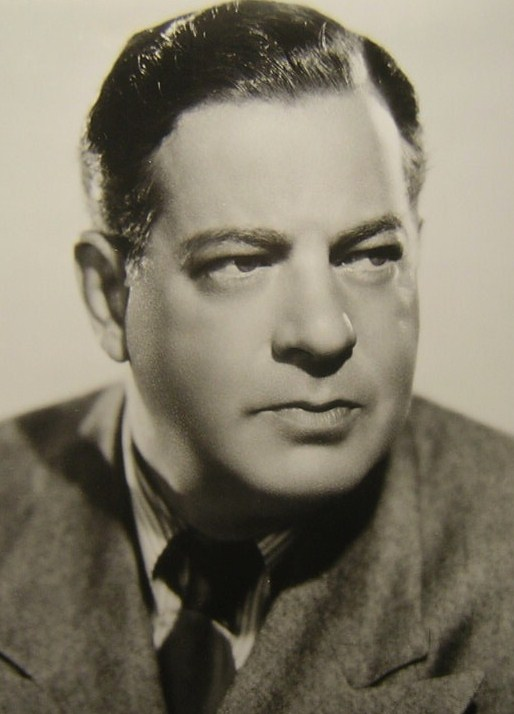
Alan Dinehart played scientist John Varnum.

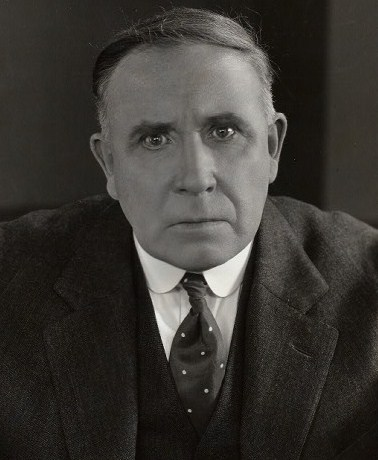
DeWitt Jennings played police inspector Ryan.

The characters and cast from the Broadway production are listed below:

Cast of the Broadway production
Character	Broadway cast
John Varnum	Alan Dinehart
Ah Foo	Jack Gibson
Ruth Gordon	Theda Bara
Barnes	Joseph Buckley
Cicely Varnum	Helen Curry
Larry Winston	Donald Gallaher
Quong Toy	Henry Herbert
Ned Maddox	Kenneth Hill
The Stranger	Earl House
Patterson	Frank Hughes
Inspector Ryan	DeWitt C. Jennings
Nora Macree	Tessie Lawrence
Clarissa Archibald	Thais Lawton
Wung Ming	Robert Lee
Grogan	Martin Malloy
Tom Dorgan	Harry Minturn
Miller	Tom O'Hara
Ling Foo	Royal Stout

== History ==
=== Background and development ===
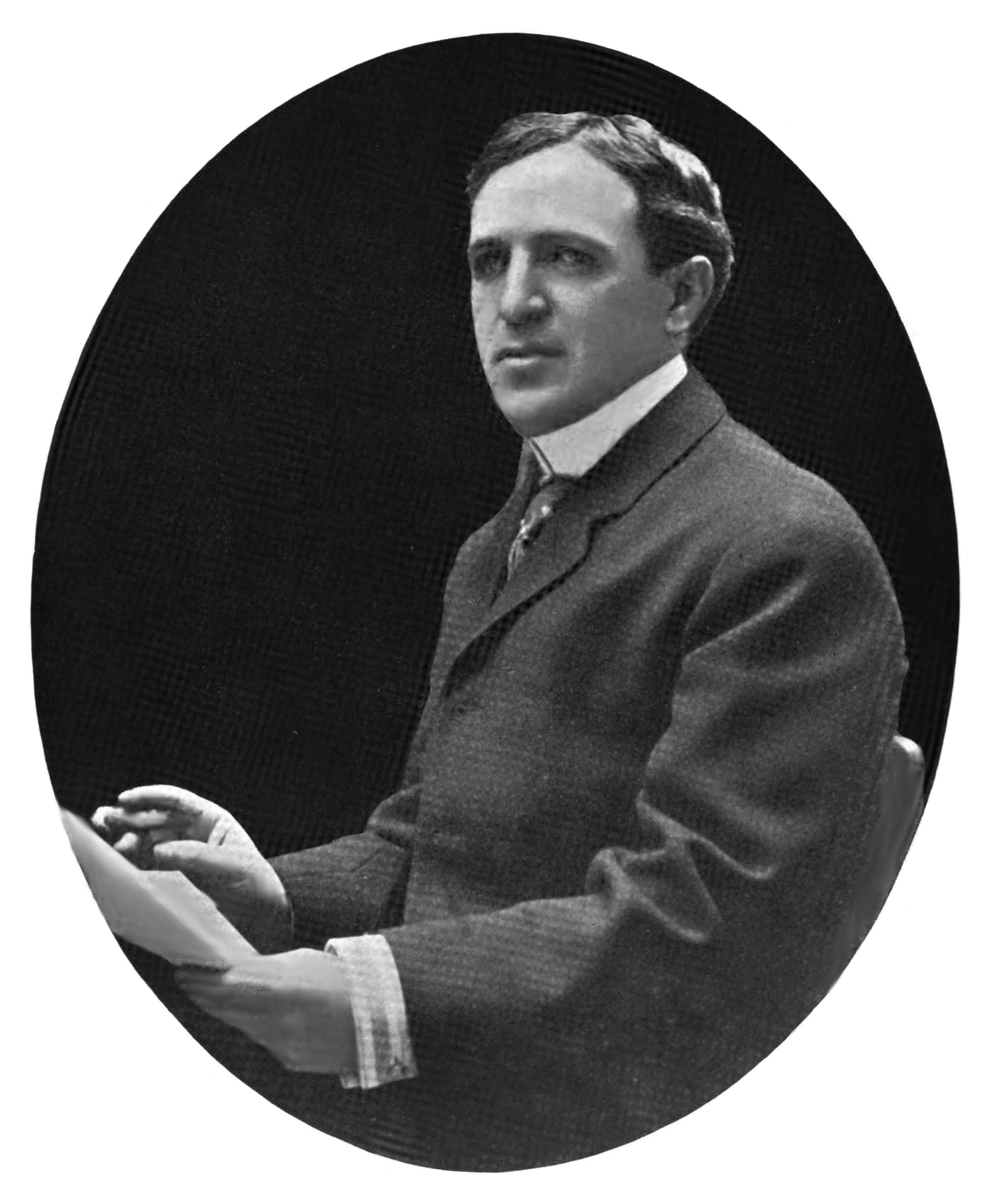
Albert H. Woods produced the play.

Leta Vance Nicholson, a movie scenario writer, wrote the first version of The Blue Flame. She sold it to theatrical agent Walter C. Jordan, who had it rewritten by George V. Hobart and John Willard. Jordan paid the three writers $10,000 for their work (about $118,000 in 2024 dollars), (Note: Johnston, Louis; Williamson, Samuel H. (2023). "What Was the U.S. GDP Then?". MeasuringWorth. United States Gross Domestic Product deflator figures follow the MeasuringWorth series.) then resold the play to producer Albert H. Woods for $35,000.

Actress Theda Bara was one of the most popular stars of silent films. From her first leading role as "the Vampire" in the 1915 movie A Fool There Was, Bara had been typecast as a "vamp" or femme fatale who seduced and ruined innocent men. (Note: These roles did not portray the undead vampires featured in later horror films. The term "vampire" for a seductive woman was derived from "The Vampire", an 1897 poem by Rudyard Kipling.) Although she sometimes performed in films playing other types of roles, these were not as successful commercially as her "vamp" films. She played dozens of similar roles while contracted with Fox Film from 1915 to 1919.

After Bara's contract with Fox ended, Woods approached her about appearing in a play. Bara's stage experience was limited. Her only previous Broadway performance was a minor role in a 1908 production of Ferenc Molnár's The Devil. She subsequently joined a couple of touring companies, but had not been on the stage since she started working in films. (Note: In these roles she performed under the stage name Theodosia De Cappet. After she became a star under the name Theda Bara, in interviews she typically avoided discussing her early career. Fox's publicists circulated false claims that she was a foreigner who had been a stage actress in Paris.) Bara told a reporter that she was offered a few scripts to consider, and chose The Blue Flame (at that time titled The Lost Soul) because it allowed her to play two versions of the character, one good and the other bad. She also hoped moving to the stage would bring her new career opportunities. Woods gave Bara a lucrative contract. Each week she received a salary of $1500. This was considerably less than the $4000 per week she had earned in her last year with Fox, but Bara was also promised half the production's net profits. For example, the play's two-week run in Boston netted Bara $10,700. Woods also provided a finely appointed private railroad car to take her from city to city when the show toured.

=== Productions and legacy ===
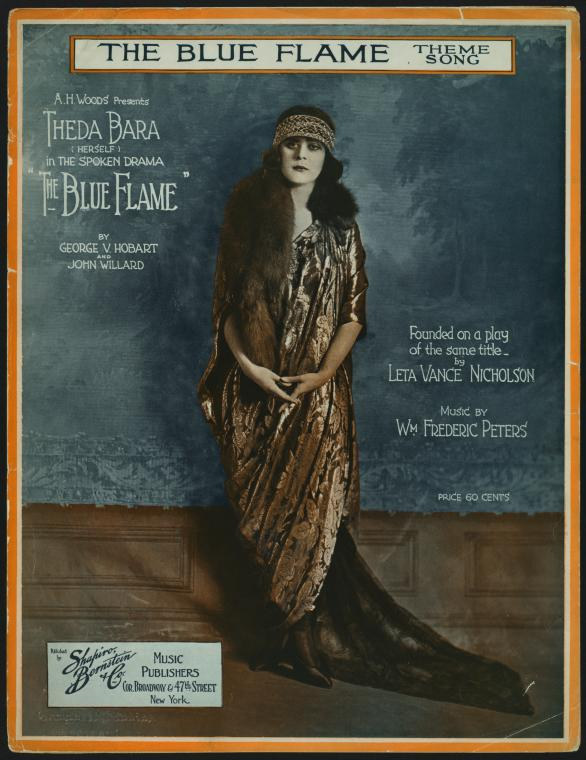
A theme song for the play was published in April 1920.

Woods hired two directors, J. C. Huffman and W. H. Gilmore, to assist with the production. The production began with a series of preview performances in February 1920, appearing in Pittsburgh; Washington, D.C.; Stamford, Connecticut; and Chicago. The final performances before the Broadway premier were in Boston in early March.

While the show was still in previews, writer Owen Davis claimed the story had been lifted from his earlier play Lola, which had appeared briefly on Broadway in March 1911, then was adapted as a movie in 1914. He filed a lawsuit, but by the end of May it was settled with a cash payment to Davis.

The show opened on Broadway at the Shubert Theatre on March 15, 1920. It had a run of 48 performances and closed in late April. The show then continued to other cities on tour. The play was further promoted by the release of sheet music for a theme song, with Bara's image featured prominently on the cover. William Frederic Peters wrote the music and Ballard MacDonald wrote the lyrics for the song, which was published in April by Shapiro, Bernstein & Co.

The tour closed on January 1, 1921. The Blue Flame was Bara's last Broadway performance. Her initial followup was a season of vaudeville touring, but she did not act in it; instead she talked with audiences and told stories about her career. She acted in a few vaudeville sketches in 1929; in 1931 she made guest appearances in some stock company performances of Ernest Vajda's Fata Morgana. Her final stage performance was in a Little Theatre production of Bella Donna in 1934. Bara's film career was also waning. She acted in only one feature film after The Blue Flame ended, the 1925 drama The Unchastened Woman.

== Reception ==
=== Critical reception ===
The play received overwhelmingly negative reviews, although some critics had minor compliments for Bara. Biographer Eve Golden described the reviews of Bara's acting as "nothing less than vicious", but the commentary about the play as a whole was even more negative. Variety expected Bara to draw audiences to the theater for at least a few weeks, but said opinions in the daily press were united about how bad the play was. In The New York Times, Alexander Woollcott mocked the dialogue, which included lines such as, "Have you brought the cocaine?" and "You make my heart laugh and I feel like a woman of the streets." Delivered seriously, this dialogue drew laughter from the audience. Woollcott highlighted one particular line: "I'm going to be so bad, I'll be remembered always." He said Bara was bad, but not bad enough to be memorable. He credited her for speaking clearly and for not losing her composure when the audience laughed at her. Other reviewers gave Bara similarly faint praise: she had "average competence" or "was not so bad". Some complimented her looks or her glamorous wardrobe.

Other reviewers were even more negative, condemning Bara along with the play generally. The theater critic for Munsey's Magazine quoted several negative reviews and compared Bara's acting unfavorably to that of drama school students. The Brooklyn Daily Eagle said she fulfilled the promise to be unforgettably bad, calling her acting "freakish". The Sun and New York Herald said Bara's acting was disappointing and the play was "abysmal in intelligence and all that touches the art of the theatre". In Ainslee's Magazine, Dorothy Parker said the play's authors had taken the line about being remembered for badness "as their working motto", and suggested the crowds at the performances were there to attack the playwrights. In the New-York Tribune, Heywood Broun suggested that the entire production company should fear the wrath of God for such a terrible play.

Historians and critics looking back on the play have affirmed the negative assessment. Biographer Ronald Genini called the play "painfully bad" and described the reviews as "a panning orgy". Theater historian Ward Morehouse described it as "one of the worst plays ever written". Literary critic Edward Wagenknecht said Bara's participation helped end her acting career. Golden wondered why Bara took the role, speculating that only "desperation and incredibly poor judgement" could have explained her participation.

=== Box office ===
Overall the play was a tremendous financial success; the previews broke attendance records. In Boston, the show sold out even after the addition of extra matinées. The first week on Broadway took in nearly $20,000, close to the maximum the Shubert Theatre could generate at normal prices. However, ticket sales fell off rapidly following the strongly negative reviews. Woods pre-sold four weeks of tickets to local ticket brokers, which helped the box office totals, but the brokers were left with unsold seats even after offering deep discounts. After leaving New York, the show returned to strong sales on the road.
