= Kathryn Forbes =

Pen name for Kathryn McLean, American writer (1908–1966)

- Born: Kathryn Anderson; March 20, 1908; San Francisco, California, U.S.
- Died: May 15, 1966 (aged 58); San Francisco, California, U.S.
- Resting place: Holy Cross Catholic Cemetery, Colma, California, U.S.
- Occupations: Writer; memoirist
- Spouse: Robert McLean
- Children: 2
- Parent: Lee Ellis Anderson (father)
- Writing career
- Pen name: Kathryn Forbes

Kathryn McLean (née Anderson) (March 20, 1908 – May 15, 1966), best known by her pen name Kathryn Forbes, was an American writer and memoirist.

== Life ==
Kathryn Anderson was born in San Francisco in 1908. Her parents moved to America in the late 1800s which made her a native-born American. Kathryn married Robert McLean, a carpenter, with whom she had two sons.

== Work ==
Forbes was a radio scriptwriter before she began writing short stories. Mama's Bank Account, her best-known work, was published in 1943 and revolved around the daily struggles and aspirations of a Norwegian family living in San Francisco in the 1910s. Mama was based on her grandmother.

Forbes' book served as the inspiration for John Van Druten's 1944 play I Remember Mama. In 1948, a film version of the play was released by RKO Pictures and starred Irene Dunne as Mama and Barbara Bel Geddes as her daughter, an aspiring writer.

Mama, a television series based on the film, was broadcast on CBS from July 1, 1949, to March 17, 1957, and starred Peggy Wood as Mama.

Forbes' novel was twice turned into a stage musical. The first, adapted by Neal Du Brock and John Clifton, opened in Buffalo, New York in 1972 with Celeste Holm in the role of Mama. In 1979, Richard Rodgers wrote the music for the second musical version, for which Norwegian actress Liv Ullmann played the role of Mama.

In 1947, Forbes published Transfer Point, regarding the daughter of divorced parents. Unlike Mama's Bank Account, which drew on the experiences of her Norwegian-born maternal grandmother, Annie Lund (1849–1928), this novel was closer to Forbes' actual childhood.

Forbes moved to an apartment in San Francisco to be near her physician for her chronic emphysema. She died on May 15, 1966.

The Kathryn Forbes McLean Memorial Fund was created shortly after her death to provide funds for improvements to the library which she frequented.
