= Buddies (musical) =

Musical by George V. Hobart

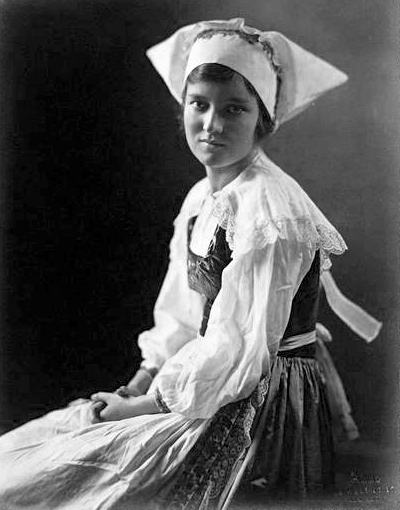
- Peggy Wood in Buddies (1919)
- Original language: English
- Written by: George V. Hobart

Premiere
- Date: October 17, 1919
- Place: Selwyn Theatre; New York City

Buddies is a 1919 musical by George V. Hobart and with music by Bentley Collingwood Hilliam. After an initial run in Boston starting on August 12, it opened at the Selwyn Theatre on Broadway on October 17, 1919, and played for 259 performances through June 12, 1920. The musical is set in Brittany, France.

== Principal Broadway cast ==
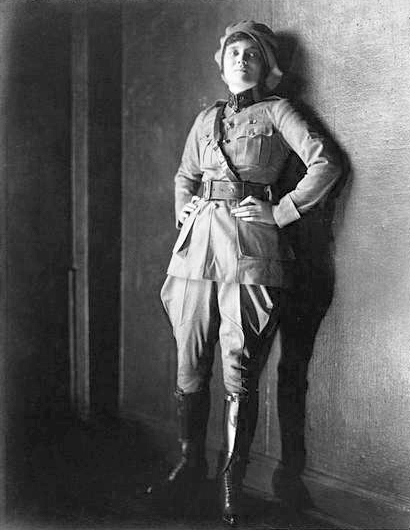
Peggy Wood as Julie

- Camile Dalberg as Madame Benoit
- Peggy Wood as Julie
- Roland Young as Babe
- Donald Brian as Sonny
- Maxine Brown as Louise Maitland
- Richard Cramer as Rube
- Edouard Durand as Alphone Pettibois
- Pauline Garon as Babette
- Robert Middlemass as Biff
