= George V. Hobart =

American writer and lyricist (1867–1926)

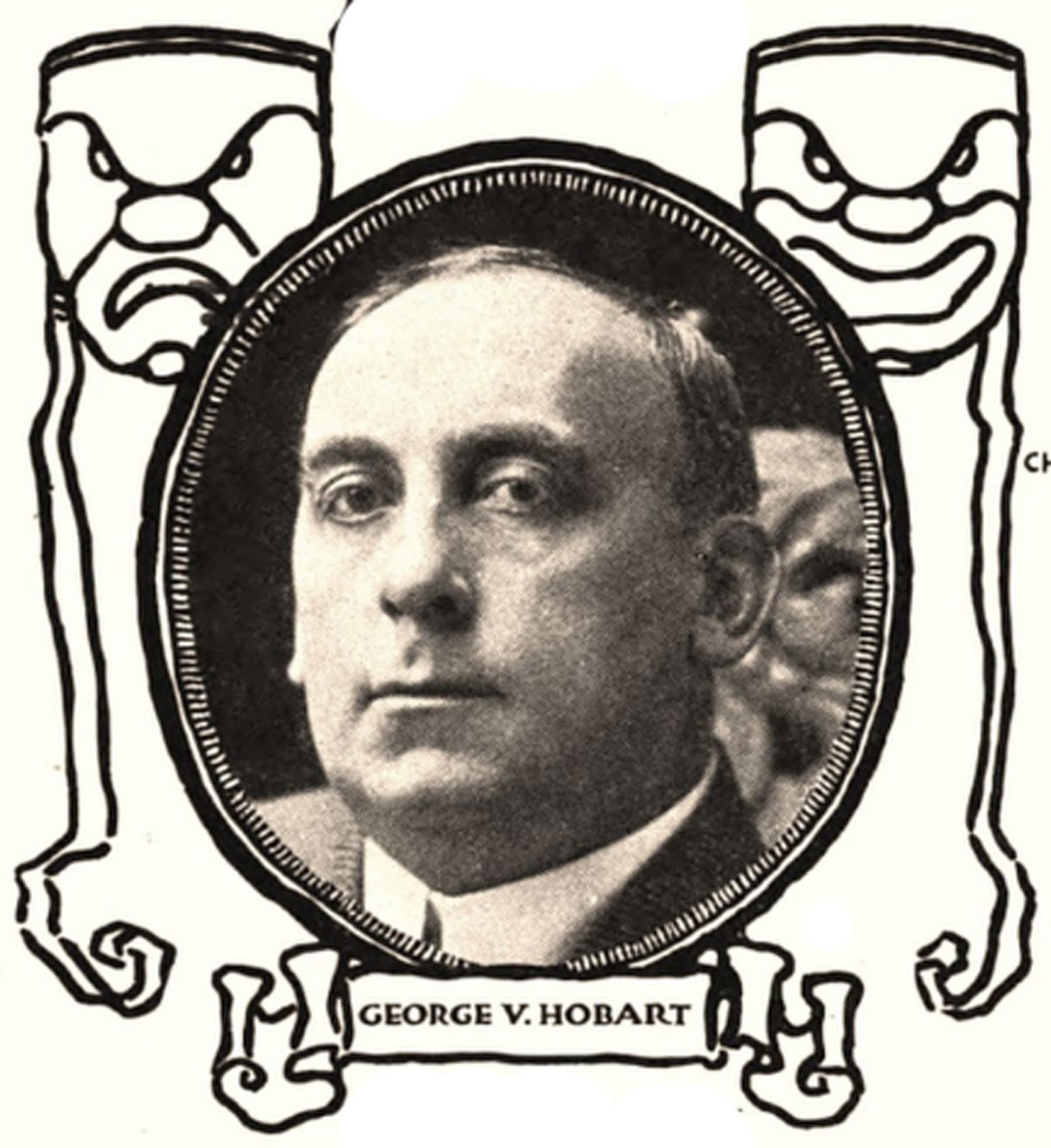
- Portrait of George V. Hobart from the 1915 playbill for Experience: A Morality Play of Today
- Born: George Vere Hobart; January 16, 1867; Cape Breton, Nova Scotia, Canada
- Died: January 31, 1926 (aged 59); Cumberland, Maryland, USA
- Occupations: Playwright, humorist
- Spouse: Sara De Vries (m. 1897; died 1923)
- Children: 2
- Writing career
- Period: 1890-1926
- Genres: Comedy, farce, satire
- Notable work: Dinkelspiel

George Vere Hobart (1867–1926) was a Canadian-American humorist who authored more than 50 musical comedy librettos and plays as well as novels and songs. At the time of his death, Hobart was "one of America's most popular humorists and playwrights". Hobart gained initial national fame for the "Dinkelspiel" letters, a weekly satirical column written in a German-American dialect. The Library of Congress includes several of his songs in the National Jukebox.

Hobart also wrote under the pseudonym Hugh McHugh. Many of his works were adapted into films.

== Early life ==
Hobart was born 16 January 1867 in Cape Breton, Nova Scotia, Canada. He immigrated to the Cumberland, Maryland to work as a telegraph operator for the United Press.

== Career ==
Hobart wrote humorous sketches and columns for the Sunday Scimitar and Baltimore News-American newspapers. He then worked for a short time at the New York Journal, before turning his attention to writing musicals, librettos, novels and children's books. Hobart is noted as an "exceptionally prolific" and versatile writer.

His better-known stage plays include the morality tale Experience; Our Mrs. McChesney cowritten with Edna Ferber and starring Ethel Barrymore; Miss Prinnt with Marie Dressler; Sonny; Hitchy-Koo of 1919 with music by Cole Porter; Buddies, and Sweet Sixteen.

Among Hobart's notable books are John Henry, Down the Line, Back to the Woods, You Can Search Me and the 1904 novel Jim Hickey, A Story of the One-Night Stands. The Random House Dictionery of American slang cites ' Hickey ' as the first time the word ' Hip ', in the slang sense of being " aware, in the know", in a cartoon by Tad Dorgan, where an African-American character uses the slang phrase "Are you hip?".

He wrote the lyrics to numerous songs.

Hobart was also a member of the Lambs Club in New York City.

== Personal life ==
Hobart was married to short-story writer Sarah Humbird De Vries, with whom he had two children. She died in 1923. He died in Cumberland, Maryland, on 31 January 1926 following a "general break down" at age 59.

== Work ==
=== Songs ===
- "A Love-Lorn Lily" (1900)
- "By The Sycamore Tree" (1903)
- "By The Old Oak Tree" (1904)
- "The Irish Girl I Love" (1905)

=== Plays ===
- Miss Manhattan (1897)
- A Million Dollars (1900)
- Broadway to Tokio (1900)
- Nell-Go-In (1900)
- Miss Prinnt (1900)
- The New Yorkers (1901)
- Sally in Our Alley (1902)
- The Jersey Lily (1903)
- Mother Goose (1903)
- Mrs. Black Is Back (1904)
- Coming Thro' the Rye (1906)
- Wildfire (1908)
- Alma, Where Do You Live? (1910)
- The Yankee Girl (1910)
- Welcome to Our City (1910)
- Experience (1914)
- Stop That Man (1915)
- Our Mrs. McChesney (1915)
- What's Your Husband Doing? (1917)
- Come-On, Charlie (1919)
- Buddies (1919)
- Hitchy-Koo of 1919 (1919)
- The Blue Flame (1920)
- Sonny (1921)
- Kissing Time, Broadway rendition

=== Bibliography ===
- Boobs
- John Henry (1901)
- Skiddoo
- You Should Worry
- Jim Hickey, A Story of the One-Night Stands (1904)
- Get Next! (1905)
- Down the Line With John Henry (1901)
- Back to the Woods : the Story of a Fall From Grace (1903)
- I'm from Missouri: (They Had to Show Me) (1904)
- The Silly Syclopedia (1905)
- Go to It (1908)
- D. Dinkelspiel: his gonversationings (1900)
- Out For the Coin

=== Films ===
Trade ad announcing release of The Wonderful Wager (Jan. 1916)

- Mrs. Black Is Back, directed by Thomas N. Heffron (1914, based on the play Mrs. Black Is Back)
- Wildfire, directed by Edwin Middleton (1915, based on the play Wildfire)
- The Yankee Girl, directed by Jack J. Clark (1915, based on the play The Yankee Girl)
- The Wonderful Wager, directed by René Plaissetty (1916, short film, based on a story by George V. Hobart)
- Alma, Where Do You Live?, directed by Hal Clarendon (1917, based on the play Alma, Where Do You Live?)
- Madame Jealousy, directed by Robert G. Vignola (1918, based on a story by George V. Hobart)
- Our Mrs. McChesney, directed by Ralph Ince (1918, based on the play Our Mrs. McChesney)
- The Jungle Trail, directed by Richard Stanton (1919, based on a story by George V. Hobart)
- What's Your Husband Doing?, directed by Lloyd Ingraham (1920, based on the play What's Your Husband Doing?)
- Experience, directed by George Fitzmaurice (1921, based on the play Experience)
- Sonny, directed by Henry King (1922, based on the play Sonny)
- Welcome to Our City, directed by Leopold Wharton and Robin H. Townley (1922, based on the play Welcome to Our City)
- Wildfire, directed by T. Hayes Hunter (1925, based on the play Wildfire)
- Stop That Man!, directed by Nat Ross (1928, based on the play Stop That Man)

Screenwriter

- Mighty Lak' a Rose (dir. Edwin Carewe, 1923)
- Success (dir. Ralph Ince, 1923)
- The White Sister (dir. Henry King, 1923)
- Bad Company (dir. Edward H. Griffith, 1925)
