= Marian Grudeff =

Canadian concert pianist music teacher and musical theatre composer

- Born: April 18, 1927
- Origin: Canada
- Died: November 4, 2006 (aged 79)
- Occupations: Concert pianist music teacher and Musical theatre composer

Marian Grudeff (April 18, 1927 – November 4, 2006) was a Canadian concert pianist music teacher and musical theatre composer of Bulgarian origin.

== Early life and education ==
Born in Toronto, Ontario, Grudeff studied piano under Mona Bates and performed Liszt's Hungarian Fantasy with the Toronto Symphony Orchestra at the age of 11.

== Career ==
Grudeff gave her first solo recital at the Eaton Auditorium. She performed extensively in Canada and the United States in the 1940s, and taught at the Royal Conservatory of Music from 1948 to 1952. In 1950 she was the musical director of the Toronto theatrical revue Spring Thaw; she continued to be involved with the show during the 1950s and early 1960s, directing, writing songs for the show with Ray Jessel, and playing piano.

Grudeff and Jessel subsequently collaborated on songs for the Broadway musical Baker Street; they moved to New York City, where the show ran more than 300 performances and received mixed reviews. They also worked together on music for a new version of Hellzapoppin', which was staged in Montreal during Expo 67, and they cowrote the musical Life Can Be - Like Wow, which was produced at the Charlottetown Festival in 1969.

Grudeff returned to the Royal Conservatory of Music in 1972, teaching there until 1979. She resumed her concert performances in 1976, giving recitals in Toronto and Bulgaria. After 1981, she continued to teach piano privately in Toronto until her retirement. During this time she worked as a musical director at Hart House Theatre, where she became a mentor to Don McKellar and Lisa Lambert, who would go on to create the hit musical The Drowsy Chaperone.

Grudeff died in Toronto in 2006.
