= Thais Lawton =

American actress (1879–1956)

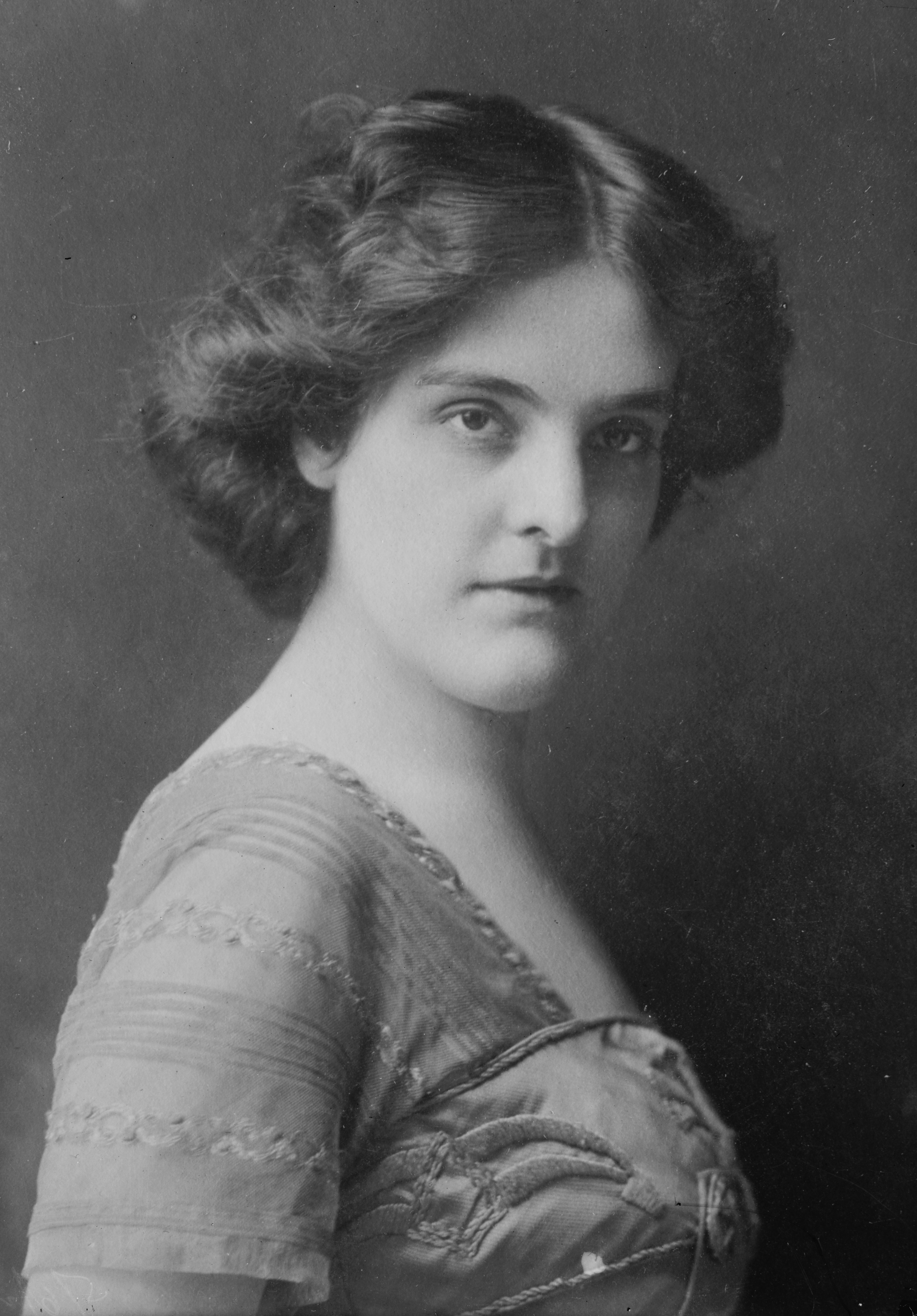
- Lawton in 1915
- Born: Eugenia (or Eugenie) Thais Lawton; June 18, 1879; Louisville, Kentucky U.S.
- Died: December 18, 1956 (aged 77); U.S
- Occupation: Actress
- Spouse: Percy McDermott (divorced)

Thais Lawton (June 18, 1879 – December 18, 1956) was an American actress.

== Early life ==
Eugenia (or Eugenie) Thais Lawton was raised and educated in Louisville, Kentucky, the daughter of Joseph Eugene Lawton and Caroline Thais Magrane; her father was English and her mother was French. Fellow actress Thais Magrane was her cousin. She used both her first and middle name professionally until about 1906, when she began preferring "Thais Lawton".

== Career ==
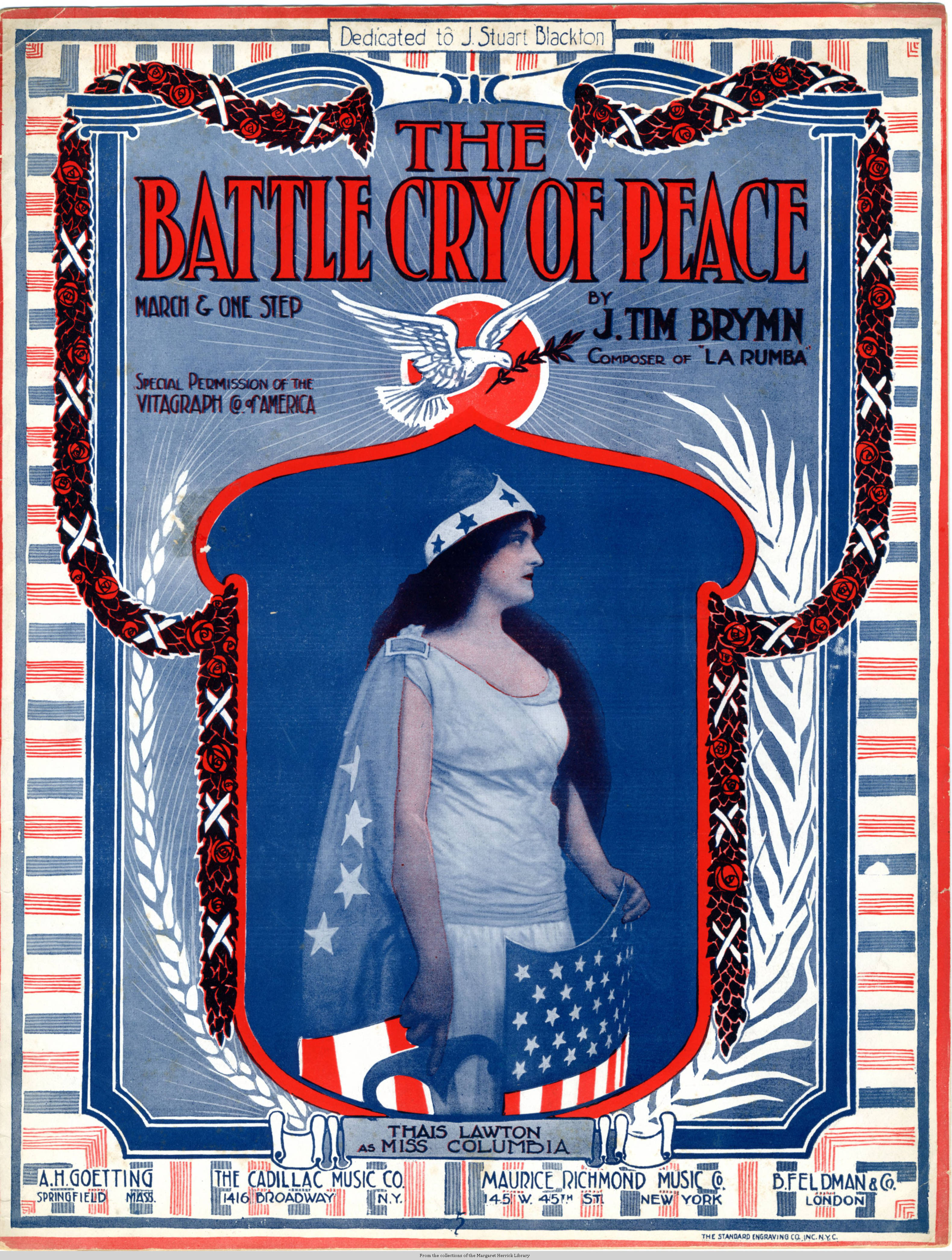
Sheet music cover from 1915, featuring Thais Lawton as "Columbia"

Lawton was active on the New York stage from 1900 to 1940, best known for playing "adventuresses" and "villainesses". "Just playing nice heroines would become rather tiresome, I am afraid," she explained to a reporter in 1923.

She appeared in shows including Lost River (1900), The Second Mrs. Tanqueray (1907), The Revellers (1909), Strife (1909), The School for Scandal (1909), Don (1909), Liz the Mother, The Witch (1910), Brand (1910), The Thunderbolt (1910), Vanity Fair (1911), The Piper (1911), The Blue Bird (1911), The Winter's Tale (1911), A Single Man (1911), John Gabriel Borkman (1915), The Chief (1915), Caliban by the Yellow Sands (1916), The Guilty Man (1916), The Masquerader (1917), The Crimson Alibi (1919), The Blue Flame (1920), The Wandering Jew (1921), The Exciters (1922), Jitta's Atonement (1923), Thumbs Down (1923), Two Strangers from Nowhere (1924), The Red Falcon (1924), Cain (1924), Mister Romeo (1927), Napoleon (1928), The Novice and the Duke (1929), The Royal Virgin (1930), The Ninth Guest (1930), Philip Goes Forth (1931), Going Gay (1933), Birthright (1933), Times Have Changed (1935), Love in my Fashion (1937), and Romantic Mr. Dickens (1940). She was also a frequent and popular performer in San Francisco.

Lawton appeared in two silent films, The Battle Cry of Peace (1915), and The Pardon (1915). Later in life she taught acting; among her students was actress Marie Wallace.

== Personal life ==
In 1922, Lawton was driving when her car struck and killed a child who ran into the street; she was not found to be at fault. Thais Lawton married Percy McDermott; they soon divorced. She died in 1956, aged 77 years.
