= I Remember Mama (film) =

1948 drama film directed by George Stevens

- Original film poster
- Directed by: George Stevens
- Screenplay by: DeWitt Bodeen
- Based on: I Remember Mama 1944 play by John Van Druten; Mama's Bank Account 1943 novel by Kathryn Forbes
- Produced by: Harriet Parsons; George Stevens
- Starring: Irene Dunne; Barbara Bel Geddes; Oscar Homolka; Ellen Corby; Philip Dorn
- Cinematography: Nicholas Musuraca
- Edited by: Robert Swink
- Music by: Roy Webb
- Distributed by: RKO Radio Pictures
- Release date: March 9, 1948
- Running time: 134 minutes
- Country: United States
- Language: English
- Budget: $3,068,000
- Box office: $2.9 million

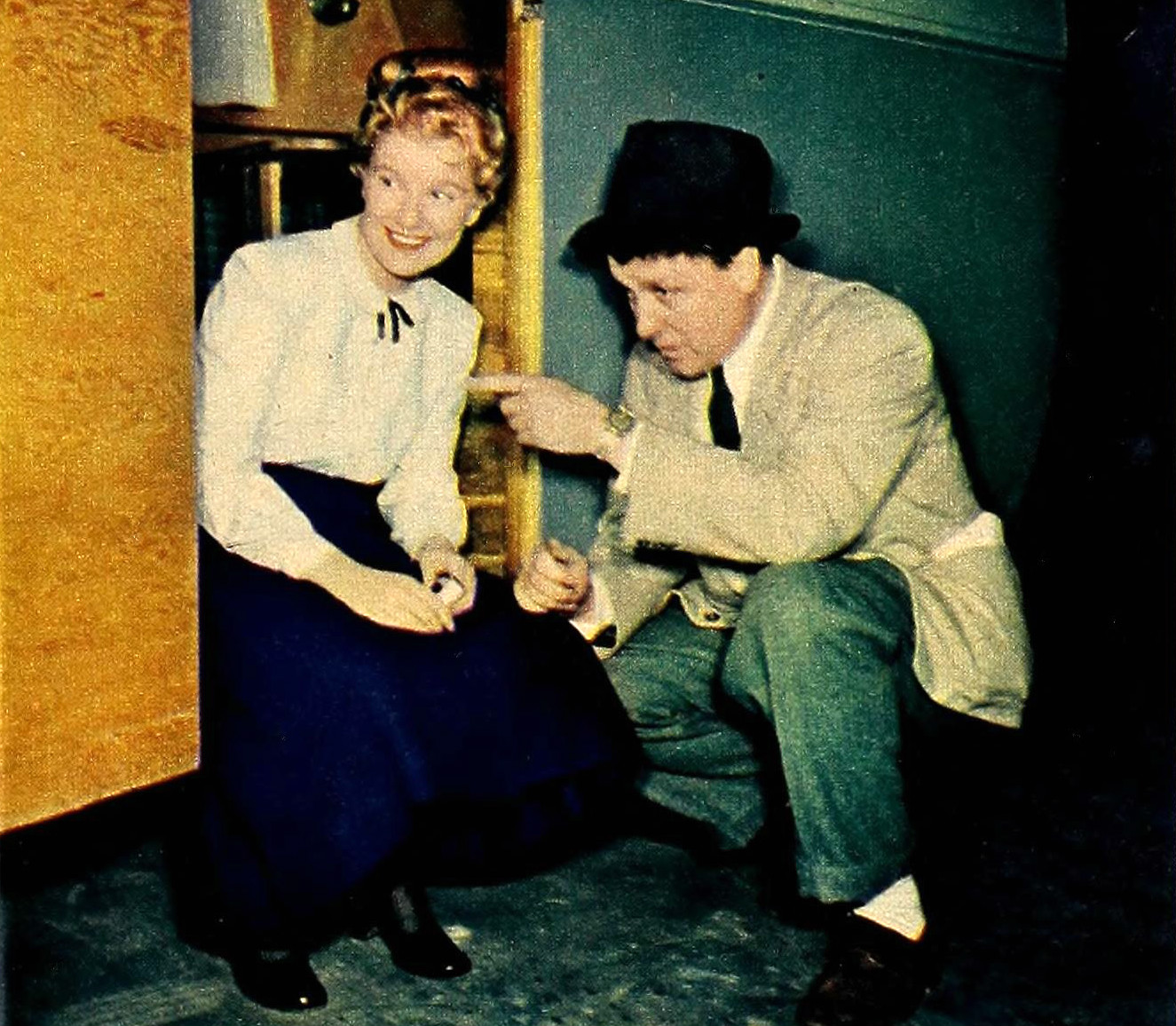
Director George Stevens with Barbara Bel Geddes on set

I Remember Mama is a 1948 American drama film directed by George Stevens from a screenplay by DeWitt Bodeen, whose work was adapted from John Van Druten's stage play. Druten, in turn, had based his play on Kathryn Forbes' novel Mama's Bank Account, which was originally published by Harcourt Brace in 1943. The story in all its variant forms recounts the everyday life and economic struggles of a Norwegian immigrant family in San Francisco in the early 20th century. The film stars Irene Dunne as the mother, as well as Barbara Bel Geddes, Oscar Homolka, Ellen Corby and Philip Dorn. Homolka portrays Uncle Chris in the film, a role he had performed earlier in the Broadway production.

The film was nominated for five Academy Awards, including Best Supporting Actor and two for Best Supporting Actress (Homolka, Bel Geddes, and Corby, respectively), with Dunne receiving her fifth and final Best Actress nomination.

== Plot ==
The film begins with eldest daughter Katrin completing the last lines of her autobiographical novel. As she reminisces about her family life, there is a flashback to 1910, where the first of a series of vignettes finds Marta Hanson preparing the weekly budget with her husband Lars, daughters Katrin, Christine and Dagmar, and son Nels, who announces his desire to attend high school. Each family member makes a financial sacrifice to contribute to the boy's education.

Marta's sister Trina arrives, announces she is marrying undertaker Peter Thorkelson, and implores Marta to break the news to their sisters Sigrid and Jenny. When Marta threatens to reveal embarrassing anecdotes about them, the women accept their sister's decision.

When Jonathan Hyde, the Hansons' impoverished lodger, reads A Tale of Two Cities aloud for the family, they are deeply moved by the story. Later, the family is visited by Marta's gruff but soft-hearted Uncle Chris and his housekeeper Jessie Brown, who is secretly his wife. When Chris discovers Dagmar is ill with mastoiditis, he insists on taking her to the hospital. Dagmar's operation is a success, but Marta is prohibited from seeing her. Disguised as a member of the housekeeping staff, she sneaks into Dagmar's ward and softly sings to her.

When Dagmar returns home, she learns her cat, Uncle Elizabeth, had been mauled and seriously injured during its outside wanderings. Despite Dagmar's belief in her mother's healing powers, Marta feels helpless to save the cat and sends Nels to buy chloroform so she can euthanize it. The following morning, she is astonished when Dagmar walks in with an apparently cured cat. Instead of killing the cat, the dose of chloroform that Marta had administered only provided the cat with the deep sleep it needed to aid its recovery.

Mr. Hyde suddenly and quietly moves out, leaving his classic books and a check for his accumulated months of rent. The family's initial joy of receiving the large rent payment quickly vanishes once they discover that the check has no value. Sigrid and Jenny are furious; but as Marta tears up the worthless piece of paper, she declares that Hyde's gift of literature is far more valuable than the money itself.

Katrin brags to Christine that their mother is going to buy her the dresser set she has long admired as a graduation present. As she is about to leave to perform in the school's production of The Merchant of Venice, Katrin learns (from a resentful Christine) that her mother traded her heirloom brooch for the gift. Distraught, Katrin performs badly in the play and later retrieves the brooch after trading back the dresser set. Marta then gives the brooch to Katrin as a graduation present. Katrin's father presents her with her first cup of coffee, which she had been told she could drink once she was a grown-up. After taking a few sips of the "adult" beverage, Katrin is overcome with emotion by her parents' gesture, and she rushes out of the room.

Marta learns Uncle Chris is near death, and she takes Katrin to say goodbye. He reveals he has no money to leave his niece because he has been donating his income to help children with leg or foot problems walk again. He also reveals he is married to his housekeeper Jessie. After enjoying a final drink with his niece and Jessie, Uncle Chris dies peacefully in bed.

Trina marries Peter Thorkelson in the Hanson's parlor. One year later, they are seen on a park bench with their baby in a baby carriage.

Katrin is dejected when she receives her tenth literary rejection letter. Marta then takes some of her stories to famed author and gourmand Florence Dana Moorhead and convinces her to read them. Marta returns home and advises her daughter that Moorhead feels the girl should write about what she knows best. Marta urges Katrin to write about Papa. When Katrin's story is accepted for publication, she is paid $500 (equivalent to $17,000 in 2025). After announcing some of the money will go towards the purchase of the winter coat Marta wants, Katrin confesses her story is titled Mama and the Hospital. She begins to read it to her family, and the story's introduction concludes and the film itself ends with the line "But first and foremost, I remember Mama".

== Cast ==
- Irene Dunne as Marta 'Mama' Hanson
- Barbara Bel Geddes as Katrin Hanson
- Oscar Homolka as Uncle Chris Halvorsen
- Philip Dorn as Lars 'Papa' Hanson
- Steve Brown as Nels Hanson
- Peggy McIntyre as Christine Hanson
- June Hedin as Dagmar Hanson
- Cedric Hardwicke as Mr. Jonathan Hyde
- Ellen Corby as Aunt Trina
- Hope Landin as Aunt Jenny
- Edith Evanson as Aunt Sigrid
- Edgar Bergen as Peter Thorkelson
- Florence Bates as Florence Dana Moorhead
- Barbara O'Neil as Jessie Brown
- Rudy Vallee as Dr. Johnson
- Tommy Ivo as Arne

== Production ==
Stevens originally offered the role of Mama to Greta Garbo, but she had retired from films six years before and declined the role. He then cast Irene Dunne, whom he had directed in Penny Serenade in 1941. Although she was 50 years old, the actress had a youthful appearance and had to be aged with makeup to portray the family matriarch convincingly. Oscar Homolka was the only member of the original Broadway cast to reprise his role for the film.

Some scenes were filmed on Rhode Island Street, on San Francisco's Potrero Hill, Nob Hill, Telegraph Hill, Russian Hill, Eureka Valley, and Market Street.

== Release ==
The film premiered as the Easter attraction at Radio City Music Hall in New York City.

=== Critical reception ===
In his review in The New York Times, Bosley Crowther said the film "should prove irresistible" and added, "Irene Dunne does a beautiful job ... handling with equal facility an accent and a troubled look, [she] has the strength and vitality, yet the softness, that the role requires." Writing in Time in 1948, critic James Agee stated, "George Stevens ... concentrated, with confidence and resourcefulness, on character, mood and abundant detail, and on the continuous invention of satisfying and expressive things to look at. The picture is not without its faults. Often some heavy trick of tearjerking or laugh-getting or some exaggeration in acting or in the story shatters the unusually rich and pleasant moods that Stevens develops ... the picture has the easy, sweet-tempered continuity of a growing crop ... "

TV Guide calls it "a delicate charmer, sometimes precious, but nonetheless fine" and "meticulously directed."

The London-based magazine Time Out describes it as "a charmer . . . directed and acted with real delicacy."

It was named one of the year's Ten Best by Film Daily.

=== Box office ===
Despite receiving good reviews, it failed to turn a profit due to its high production costs. It recorded a loss of $1,040,000.

=== Accolades ===
The film was nominated for five Academy Awards and it was the second of four films to date, following My Man Godfrey (1936) and preceding Othello (1965) and Doubt (2008) to receive four acting nominations without being nominated for Best Picture.

Award	Category	Nominee(s)	Result
Academy Awards	Best Actress	Irene Dunne	Nominated
Academy Awards	Best Supporting Actor	Oscar Homolka	Nominated
Academy Awards	Best Supporting Actress	Barbara Bel Geddes	Nominated
Academy Awards	Best Supporting Actress	Ellen Corby	Nominated
Academy Awards	Best Cinematography – Black-and-White	Nicholas Musuraca	Nominated
Golden Globe Awards	Best Supporting Actress – Motion Picture	Ellen Corby	Won
Writers Guild of America Awards	Best Written American Comedy	DeWitt Bodeen	Nominated
Writers Guild of America Awards	Best Written American Drama	DeWitt Bodeen	Nominated
Writers Guild of America Awards	Best Screenplay Dealing Most Ably with Problems of the American Scene	DeWitt Bodeen	Nominated

The cast received a Protestant Motion Picture Council Award, which was collected by Dunne in 1949.

== Additional adaptations ==
Mama, a CBS television series starring Peggy Wood, ran from 1949 to 1957. The popularity and high ratings of the series prompted a national re-release of I Remember Mama in 1956.

After the success of the film version of I Remember Mama, Dunne, Homolka and Bel Geddes reprised their roles in a one-hour radio broadcast of the story on Lux Radio Theatre on August 30, 1948.

There was also a British Independent Television production of I Remember Mama in 1961.

A musical stage adaptation, starring Liv Ullmann and George Hearn, had a three-month run in the Majestic Theatre on Broadway in 1979.

== In popular culture ==
The 1972 horror film I Dismember Mama bears no relation to I Remember Mama, apart from the pun of its title.

Similarly, a Season 3 episode of American sitcom The Many Loves of Dobie Gillis (1959–1963) is titled "I Remember Muu Muu", a pun on the movie's title.

== See also ==
- Lists of plays adapted into feature films

== Related Reading ==
- Forbes, Kathryn (1968) Mama's Bank Account (Mariner Books, division of Houghton Mifflin Harcourt) ISBN 978-0156563772
