= John Van Alstyne Weaver =

Writer

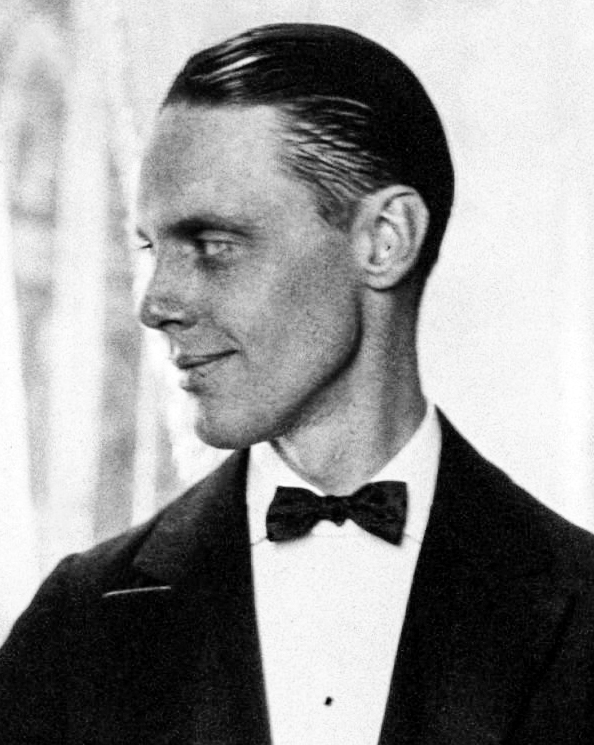
- Weaver circa 1924
- Born: July 17, 1893; Charlotte, North Carolina, U.S.
- Died: June 14, 1938 (aged 44); Colorado Springs, Colorado, U.S.
- Occupations: Novelist; poet; screenwriter
- Spouse: Peggy Wood (m. 1924)

John Van Alstyne Weaver Jr. (July 17, 1893 – June 14, 1938, often credited as John V. A. Weaver) was an American poet, novelist and screenwriter whose poems attracted the approbation of H. L. Mencken, whose works were produced on stage and on film, and who had several screenwriting credits for work on properties where he was not the author of the original work.

== Background ==
Weaver was born 17 July 1893 in Charlotte, North Carolina, the son of John Van Alstyne Weaver Sr. and Anne Randolph Tate Weaver. He married American actress Peggy Wood in 1924 and the couple had one son, David Weaver, in 1927.

Weaver was educated at Hamilton College, graduating in 1914. His literary career began with employment at the Chicago Daily News in 1919 as a book editor, and continued with employment at the Brooklyn Daily Eagle. He ceased newspaper work around in 1924 to pursue a purely literary career. In 1926 he collaborated with the director King Vidor on a short story, "The Clerk," which would later provide the scenario for Vidor's film The Crowd (MGM; 1928). He moved to work for Paramount in 1928.

Weaver attracted notice for his adaptation of American vernacular to iambic pentameter rhythms. His financial success came from successful adaptations of his work on stage and in films and, later, from screenwriting.

He died 15 June 1938 of tuberculosis in Colorado Springs, Colorado. (See Tuberculosis treatment in Colorado Springs).

== Works ==
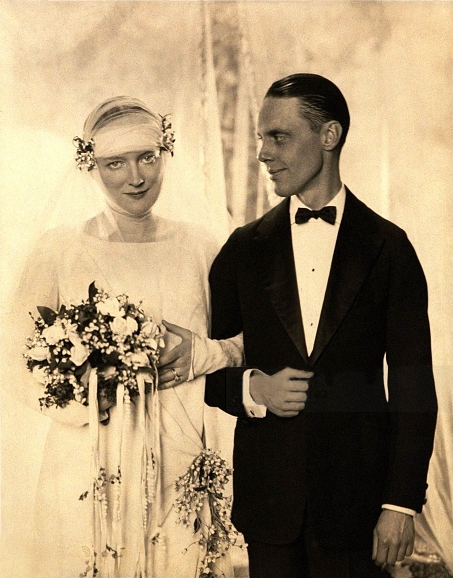
Weaver with his wife Peggy Wood at their wedding in February 1924.

- In American: poems (1921; also: John Van Alstyne Weaver, In American: the collected poems of John V. A. Weaver, ed. H. L. Mencken (1939)
- "Bootleg", in Nonsensorship; sundry observations concerning prohibitions, inhibitions, and illegalities, by (edited by) Heywood Broun, G. P. Putnam's (1922)
- Margey wins the game (1922)
- Finders: more poems in American (1923)
- Love 'em and leave 'em; a comedy in three acts (1926) (with George Abbott); adapted from a verse novel by Weaver; also done as the 1926 silent film Love 'Em and Leave 'Em and later as a talking picture under the title The Saturday Night Kid in 1929.
- Her knight comes riding (1928)
- To youth (1928)
- Turning Point (1930)
- More "In American" poems (1930)
- Trial balance, a sentimental inventory (1932)
- Joy-girl (1932)
