= I Remember Mama (play) =

1944 play by John Van Druten

- Playbill for the 1944 play, I Remember Mama
- Written by: John Van Druten
- Based on: Mama's Bank Account by Kathryn Forbes
- Characters: Mama; Papa; Uncle Chris; Katrin; Christine; Dagmar; Arne; Nels; Florence Dana Moorhead; Aunt Jenny; Aunt Trina
- Original language: English
- Genre: Comedy
- Setting: In and around San Francisco in the early 20th century

Premiere
- Date premiered: October 19, 1944
- Place premiered: Music Box Theatre, New York City

I Remember Mama is a play by John Van Druten based on Kathryn Forbes' novel Mama's Bank Account, loosely based on her childhood. It is a study of family life centered on a Norwegian immigrant family in San Francisco early in the 20th century. The play premiered on Broadway on October 19, 1944, at the Music Box Theatre in New York City, where it ran for 713 performances; it was produced by Richard Rodgers and Oscar Hammerstein II. The cast included Mady Christians, Oscar Homolka, and Joan Tetzel. Marlon Brando played a minor role, making his Broadway debut as Nels.

== Synopsis ==
The play revolves around the life of the Hansons, a loving Norwegian immigrant family, living on Steiner Street in San Francisco at the turn of the 20th century. Told through the nostalgic eye of Katrin, one of three daughters, it is the story of a working-class family trying to live the American dream. Papa Hanson is a blue-collar worker; he and Mama attempt to raise their four children so that they understand the difference between right and wrong, between selfishness and selflessness. They are assisted by Mama's uncle, Uncle Chris, whose gruff exterior hides his inner charm and generosity.

Mama and Papa (Marta and Lars) believe in hard work and a good education. They struggle to put their son Nels through high school as each member of the family makes sacrifices in order to accomplish this goal. They are warm and affectionate to each other, but very frugal in their use of funds. The three aunts, Jenny, Sigrid and Trina, offer a counterpoint as the first two are usually selfish and petty, and Aunt Trina is mostly kind.

Through their hard work, wise financial decisions, and creative common sense, Mama and Papa manage to raise and educate their children.

== Productions ==
=== Original ===
The play opened at the Music Box Theatre in New York City on October 19, 1944, starring Mady Christians, Richard Bishop, Joan Tetzel and Oscar Homolka. The production marked the Broadway debut of Marlon Brando. I Remember Mama was a successful production, running for 713 performances, and it closed on June 29, 1946.

=== Original cast ===
- Mady Christians as Mama
- Oscar Homolka as Uncle Chris
- Joan Tetzel as Katrin
- Robert Antoine as Arne
- Frank Babcock as Soda Clerk
- Richard Bishop as Papa
- Marlon Brando as Nels
- Josephine Brown as Florence Dana Moorhead
- Dorothy Elder as a Nurse
- Marie Gale as a Nurse
- Ruth Gates as Aunt Jenny
- Adrienne Gessner as Aunt Trina
- Frances Heflin as Christine
- Carolyn Hummel as Dagmar
- Herbert Kenwith as a Bellboy
- Ottilie Kruger as Dorothy Schiller
- Louise Lorimer as a Woman
- Ellen Mahar as Aunt Sigrid
- Oswald Marshall as Mr. Hyde
- William Pringle as Dr. Johnson
- Cora Smith as Madeline
- Bruno Wick as Mr. Thorkelson

(Cast list as per Internet Broadway Database)

== Adaptations ==
The play was made into a 1948 film of the same name, which starred Irene Dunne in the title role, as well as Barbara Bel Geddes, Philip Dorn, and Oscar Homolka who reprised the role of Uncle Chris, which he had created on Broadway. The film was nominated for five Academy Awards: Best Actress in a Leading Role (Irene Dunne); Best Actor in a Supporting Role (Oscar Homolka); Best Actress in a Supporting Role (Barbara Bel Geddes); Best Actress in a Supporting Role (Ellen Corby); and Best Cinematography, Black-and-White (Nicholas Musuraca). While the cast did not win any Oscars, Ellen Corby did win the Golden Globe for Best Performance by an Actress in a Supporting Role in a Motion Picture.

In 1979, Richard Rodgers transformed the original play, which he had co-produced with Oscar Hammerstein II in 1944, into a musical, also named I Remember Mama. It was Rogers' last work before his death in December of that year. The play was produced at the Majestic Theatre, where it previewed on April 26, 1979, and officially opened on May 31. The production ran for 108 performances, closing on September 2, and starred Liv Ullmann, George Hearn, and George S. Irving. Rodgers wrote the music, with lyrics by Martin Charnin, and book by Thomas Meehan.

Mama, a series on CBS, starred Peggy Wood and ran from 1949 until 1957.

After the success of the screen adaptation, Dunne, Homolka, and Bel Geddes reprised their roles in a one-hour Lux Radio Theatre adaptation of the film on August 30, 1948.

There was also a British Independent Television production in 1961.
