= Our Mrs. McChesney =

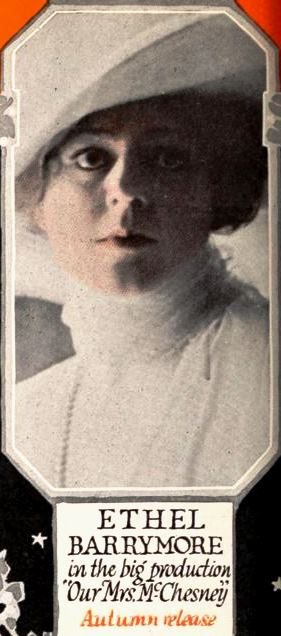
- Advertisement
- Directed by: Ralph Ince
- Written by: Luther Reed (scenario)
- Based on: Our Mrs. McChesney by Edna Ferber and George V. Hobart
- Produced by: Maxwell Karger
- Starring: Ethel Barrymore
- Cinematography: William J. Black
- Production company: Metro Pictures
- Distributed by: Metro Pictures
- Release date: August 18, 1918
- Running time: 50 minutes; 5 reels
- Country: United States
- Language: Silent (English intertitles)

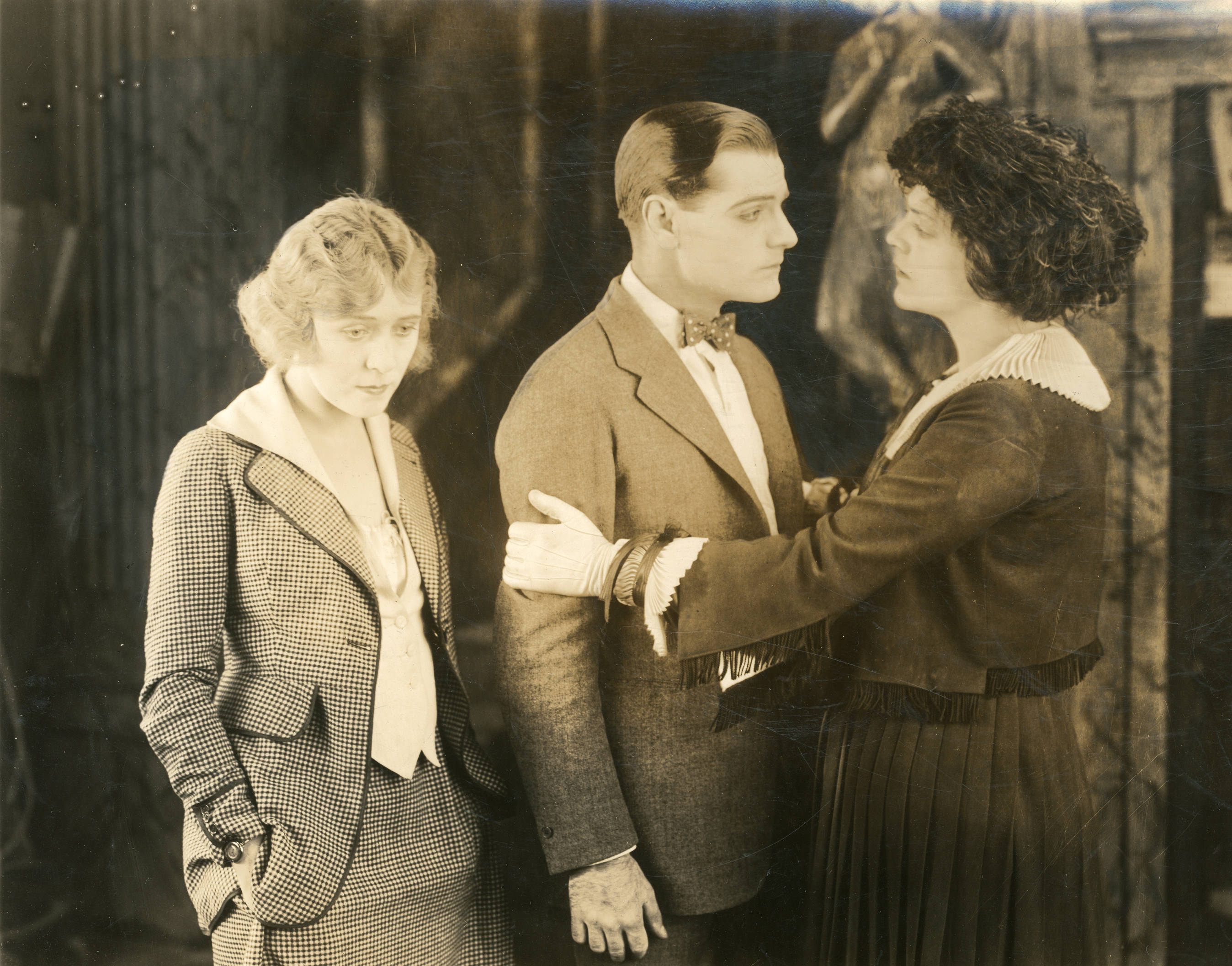
still from the film with Lucille Lee Stewart, Wilfred Lytell and Ethel Barrymore. *note sometimes the still is attributed to The Beloved Rogue.

Our Mrs. McChesney is a lost 1918 American silent comedy-drama film produced and distributed by Metro Pictures, directed by Ralph Ince, and based on the 1915 play by Edna Ferber and George V. Hobart starring Ethel Barrymore.

Barrymore reprised her role from the popular play, as did her fellow cast members Huntley Gordon and William H. St. James. Wilfred Lytell was a brother of Bert Lytell and Lucille Lee Stewart was a sister of Anita Stewart. Ince was married to Lucille Lee Stewart.

== Plot ==
As described in a film magazine, Emma McChesney (Barrymore), saleswoman for T. A. Buck & Co., plans to give up the "road" and settle down with her boy Jack (Lytell). She discovers that Jack has married a chorus girl while at college and also raised a check that she had sent him. Determined to make a man of him, she secures a position for him at T. A. Buck & Co. and sends the daughter-in-law to a boarding school. She designs a new skirt for the company that finds favor at a fashion show when modeled by Jack's wife, and saves the company from bankruptcy.

== Cast ==
- Ethel Barrymore as Emma McChesney
- Huntley Gordon as T.A. Buck Jr.
- Wilfred Lytell as Jack McChesney
- Lucille Lee Stewart as Vera Sherwood
- John Daly Murphy as Abel Fromkin
- Walter Percival as "Beauty" Blair
- William H. St. James as "Fat" Ed Myers
- Ricca Allen as Hattie Stitch
- George S. Trimble as Joe Greenbaum
- Sammy Cooper as Izzy Greenbaum (*Samuel Colt; son of Ethel Barrymore)
- Fred Walters as Sam Harrison

== See also ==
- List of lost films
- Ethel Barrymore on stage, screen and radio
