= Alma, Where Do You Live? =

1910 musical

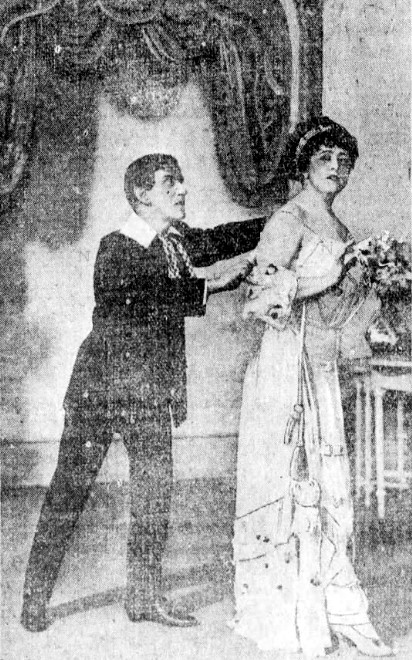
- John McCloskey and Truly Shattuck during the broadway production
- Original language: English
- Written by: George V. Hobart

Premiere
- Date: September 26, 1910
- Place: Weber's Music Hall; New York City
- Directed by: Joe Weber

Alma, Where Do You Live? is a 1910 Broadway musical with lyrics and book by George V. Hobart and music by Jean Briquet. It opened at Weber's Music Hall on September 26, 1910, and closed on April 15, 1911, totaling 232 performances. The show was adapted from a German translation of a French play by Paul Nerve.

Joe Weber produced and directed the show, with Hugo Frey acting as musical director.

After the show's initial Broadway run, it toured some cities in 1912, including Lodi, California.

The show was later adapted into a film of the same name.

== Plot ==
A wealthy Parisian man dies, leaving his entire four million franc fortune to his nephew, Pierre Le Peach, on the condition that he has not had sex with or proposed to any women by a certain date. If this condition is violated, the fortune will be inherited by Theobold and Gaston. The two men decide to enlist Alma, a beautiful milliner, to tempt Pierre into proposing before the given date in the will. Alma, however, falls in love with Pierre, and prevents him from proposing before he properly receives his inheritance. The date passes, Pierre receives the inheritance, and he and Alma marry.

== Cast ==
	1910 Broadway	1912 Tour
Alma	Kitty Gordon	Vera Michelena
Pierre le Peach	John McCloskey	Robert Dore
Theobald	Charles A. Bigelow	William H. Power
Gaston	George W. Leslie	Ezra Mathews
Germaine	Ivy Barbour	Madelene Sorel
Fleurette	Ethel Dovey	
Count Bolivario	Edouard Durand	
Antoinette	Georgia Harvey	Bertha Whitney
Louise	Charlotte Leslay	Shirli Rives
Dunoir	E. F. Nagle	
Renault	Frederick Truesdell	Daniel Moyles
Piquart	George Loane Tucker	Walter Liebmann
Mimi	Daisy James	

== Songs ==
=== Act l ===
- Boo Hoo-Hoo (Louise)
- Nevermore (Theobold and Gaston)
- Alma (Alma)
- Girlies (Pierre le Peach)
- Childhood Days (Alma and Pierre le Peach)
- FInale

=== Act ll ===
- Bogie Boo (Theobold and Gaston)
- The Land of Beautiful Dreams (Alma and Pierre le Peach)
- Sail Home (Alma)
- Love Me (The Tom Cat Song) (Pierre le Peach)
- Finale

=== Act lll ===
- Show Me Around and Around (Theobold)
- Kiss Me, My Love (Alma and Pierre le Peach)
- Finale
