= Hitchy-Koo of 1919 =

Musical revue by Cole Porter and George V. Hobart

- Music: Cole Porter
- Lyrics: Cole Porter
- Book: George V. Hobart
- Productions: 1919 Broadway

Hitchy-Koo of 1919 is a musical revue with music and lyrics by Cole Porter and a book by George V. Hobart. This revue was third in a series of four Hitchy-Koo Broadway revues from 1917 to 1920 produced by, and starring, Raymond Hitchcock. The revues were named after the 1912 popular song "Hitchy-Koo" by composers Lewis F. Muir and Maurice Abrahams with lyrics by L. Wolfe Gilbert; the only song which was featured in all of the Hitchy-Koo revues. The original Broadway production of this version played in 1919. The revue received favourable reviews.

== Production history ==
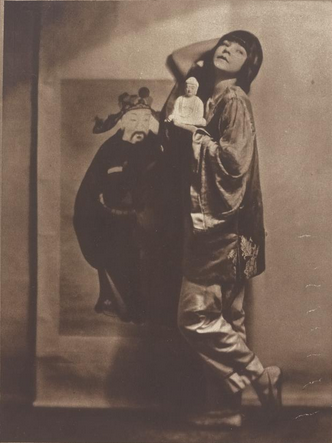
Marion Wilbanks in Hitchy-Koo of 1920

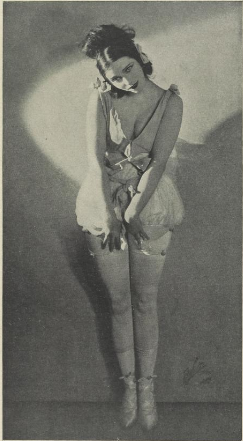
Corone Paynter in Hitchy-Koo of 1920

The show had tryouts in Atlantic City, New Jersey in August 1919 and the Colonial Theatre, Boston in September 1919 prior to its Broadway premiere. The revue debuted on Broadway at the Liberty Theatre on October 6, 1919 and closed on November 22, 1919, running for a total of 56 performances. The show later toured the United States. It starred, and was produced by, Raymond Hitchcock, who also produced and starred in versions of Hitchy-Koo in 1917, 1918, and 1920.

Some of the songs were written while Porter was in Paris, during World War I. As Porter was returning to the United States by ship, he met Hitchcock. After hearing some of Porter's songs, Hitchcock engaged Porter for the 1919 show. The song "When I Had a Uniform On", helped launch the stage career of the Broadway comic, Joe Cook. One of the songs, "Old-Fashioned Garden" became Porter's first hit. (The song used the surplus flower costumes the producers had bought from Florenz Ziegfeld.)

Besides Hitchcock, the large cast included Lucille Ager, Maurice Black, Dan Brennan, Chief Eagle Horse, Sylvia Clark, Joe Cook, Lillian Kemble-Cooper, James J. Doherty, Charles Howard, Waneta Means, Ruth Mitchell, Florence O'Denishawn, Ursula O'Hare, Elaine Palmer, Eleanor Sinclair, Mark Sullivan, and Charles Witzell.

== Songs ==
- "Pagliacci" – Lillian Kemble Cooper, Elaine Palmer, Ursula O'Hare and Ensemble
- "When Black Sallie Sings Pagliacci" – Ruth Mitchell and Ensemble
- "I Introduced" (a.k.a. "I Presented") – Raymond Hitchcock and Ensemble
- "Hitchy's Garden of Roses" (a.k.a. "In Hitchy's Garden") – Lillian Kemble Cooper and Ensemble
- "When I Had a Uniform On" (a.k.a. "Demobilization Song") – Joe Cook, Eleanor Sinclair and Ensemble
- "I've Got Somebody Waiting" – Ruth Mitchell and Ensemble
- "Peter Piper" – Raymond Hitchcock and Ensemble
- "The Sea is Calling" [sung in counterpoint with "Peter Piper"] – Ruth Mitchell and Ensemble
- "I'm an Anesthetic Dancer" – Sylvia Clark
- "My Cozy Little Corner in the Ritz" – Raymond Hitchcock and Ensemble
- "Old-Fashioned Garden" – Lillian Kemble Cooper and Ensemble
- "Bring Me Back My Butterfly" – Lillian Kemble Cooper and Ensemble

"Old-Fashioned Garden" and "Peter Piper" were recorded in 1919 by Prince's Band / Orchestra (Columbia A-2874). "Old-Fashioned Garden" was recorded again the same year by Olive Kline (Victor 45201). The following year, "Old-Fashioned Garden" was recorded by Joseph M. Knecht (Emerson 10319), Yerkes Jazarimba Band (Paramount 200043) and Palace Trio (Victor 35696).

== Critical reception ==
The revue was well received. The New York Times critic wrote: "The music and lyrics are the work of Cole Porter, who has made a particularly clever job of the lyrics and a good tinkling one of the music."
