= I Remember Mama (musical) =

1979 American musical

- 1985 Studio Recording
- Music: Richard Rodgers
- Lyrics: Martin Charnin; Raymond Jessel
- Book: Thomas Meehan
- Basis: Memoir by Kathryn Forbes; Mama's Bank Account
- Productions: 1979 Broadway

I Remember Mama is a musical with a book by Thomas Meehan, lyrics by Martin Charnin and Raymond Jessel, and music by Richard Rodgers. The musical ran on Broadway in 1979.

== Origins ==
I Remember Mama originated as a memoir by Kathryn Forbes titled Mama's Bank Account. It was adapted for the stage by John Van Druten as a play, which ran on Broadway from 1944 to 1946. Richard Rodgers and Oscar Hammerstein II were the producers. It was filmed in 1948, and served as the basis for a 1950s television series, titled Mama. Every incarnation basically was the same, a series of heartwarming vignettes centering on a family of Norwegian immigrants living in San Francisco in the early 20th century. At its core is the oldest daughter, Katrin, who yearns to be a published writer and conspires to meet renowned author Dame Sybil Fitzgibbons, a guest at the Fairmont Hotel, for professional advice and guidance. It is through Katrin's eyes the struggles, hopes, and dreams of the Hansens unfold.

== Production ==
The musical adaptation was beset with problems from the beginning. Rodgers and Charnin had composed a full score before the libretto was written, so they ended up having to replace a significant number of songs throughout rehearsals. The original director, Charnin, was replaced by Cy Feuer after tryouts in Philadelphia, with producer Alexander H. Cohen saying "they had to go 'for radical surgery' ". The original choreographer, Graciela Daniele, was replaced by Danny Daniels.

The musical, produced by Alexander H. Cohen and Hildy Parks opened on Broadway on May 31, 1979, at the Majestic Theatre, where it closed on September 2 after 108 performances and 40 previews. Directed by Cy Feuer, the opening cast featured Liv Ullmann, George Hearn, Dolores Wilson, and George S. Irving. The spectacular and clever set was designed by the late David Mitchell (of "Annie" fame).

== Reception ==
By 1979, Broadway audiences had become accustomed to edgier musicals such as Sweeney Todd and Evita. Critics found Mama to be old-fashioned and corny, and all were quick to describe the musically disinclined Ullmann as miscast. The New York Times reviewer wrote: "At the end of its much-postponed and choppy progress...this big and expensive musical had buried most of the strengths it possesses under a mass of cliches and a pervading, forced cuteness.... Miss Ullman is unsuited to it."

Show business insiders dubbed the Rodgers' production "I Dismembered Mama." A different musical version starring Celeste Holm played several regional theaters and was better received by audiences and reviewers alike but was prevented from coming to New York.

Advance box office sales, particularly for matinée performances, had been strong enough to keep the show alive in its early weeks, but attendance quickly dropped in numbers dramatic enough to warrant closing. It was Rodgers' last musical.

An original cast album was never recorded, but a studio recording with Hearn and Irving reprising their stage roles and Sally Ann Howes replacing Ullmann was released in 1985.

== Canadian premiere ==
The first Canadian production of the musical came in 2004. Produced by the Toronto Civic Light Opera Company, the production was designed and directed by Joe Cascone. Starring Caroline Moro-Dalicandro as Mama, David Haines as Papa, Larry Westlake as Uncle Chris and Andrea Strayer as Katrin. This production took a few minor liberties with the script and score (most effectively reinstating the cut song "I Don't Know How" and adding a reprise of "A Little Bit More" late in Act 2), but was a very big success for the company. The show ran over the Christmas season and garnered rave reviews and tremendous audience reception. Quoted one member of the original Broadway production staff, "The show is a hit at last!"

== Song list ==
Act I

- I Remember Mama
- A Little Bit More
- A Writer Writes at Night
- Ev'ry Day (Comes Something Beautiful)
- The Hardangerfjord
- You Could Not Please Me More
- Uncle Chris
- Easy Come, Easy Go
- It Is Not the End of the World

Act II

- Mama Always Makes it Better
- Lars, Lars
- Fair Trade
- It's Going to Be Good to Be Gone
- Time
- I Remember Mama (Reprise)
