= Judson Laire =

American actor

Judson Laire (August 3, 1902 – July 5, 1979) was an American film, stage, and television actor best known for starring as Lars Hansen in the early CBS television series, Mama from 1949 to 1957, as well as several daytime soap operas including As the World Turns, The Nurses, Love is a Many Splendored Thing, and The Edge Of Night.

Laire was born in Pleasantville, New York.

In a 30-year stage career Laire appeared in nine Broadway productions. Among his Broadway credits was Advise and Consent by Loring Mandel which opened on November 17, 1960.

Laire portrayed Woodrow Wilson in "Woodrow Wilson and the Unknown Soldier", an episode of Our American Heritage on NBC=TV on May 13, 1961.

Laire died in a hospital in Rhinebeck, New York, on July 5, 1979, aged 76.

== Filmography ==
Year	Title	Role	Notes
1948	The Naked City	Publisher	Uncredited
1959	John Paul Jones	Mr. Danders	
1963	The Ugly American	Senator Brenner	
1964	Shock Treatment	Harley Manning	
