= Alexander H. Cohen =

American businessman (1920–2000)

Alexander H. Cohen (July 24, 1920 – April 22, 2000) was an American theatrical producer who mounted more than one hundred productions on both sides of the Atlantic. He was the only American producer to maintain offices in the West End as well as on Broadway.

== Personal life ==
Cohen was born in New York City, the son of Laura (Tarantous) and Alexander H. Cohen. Cohen's father, a businessman, died when Cohen was four. His mother remarried to a banker, and Cohen, together with his brother Gerry, lived on Park Avenue in a lavish duplex penthouse.

He was employed by the Bulova Watch Company where he spent seven years, becoming its director of advertising and publicity, a business that brought him into contact with theatre people. During this time, World War II, he was drafted into the United States Army, and after a year was invalided out with a leg ailment.

His brother committed suicide in 1954, at which point Cohen became estranged from his mother.

Mr. Cohen's first marriage, to Jocelyn Newmark, ended in divorce. They had a daughter, who is named Barbara. He married actress Hildy Parks in 1956, who later became his producing partner. He died from emphysema in New York City on April 22, 2000. Parks followed him 4 years later, in 2004. He is survived by son Gerry Cohen, of Los Angeles, daughter Barbara Hoffmann of Manhattan; another son, Christopher A. Cohen, also of Manhattan; one grandson named Brock Pernice, one great-granddaughter with the name of Mia A. Pernice and a great-grandson named C. Oliver Pernice.

== Career as producer ==
With an inheritance, he initially became an investor in a number of flops, producing his first Broadway show with Ghost for Sale in 1941, which closed after six performances. He followed this quickly with his next production, the thriller Angel Street, which ran for three years (and was made into the movie Gaslight). Soon, he revealed himself to have a decidedly eclectic approach to popular entertainment with a busy schedule of productions. They ran the gamut from comedies (Little Murders) to revues (At the Drop of a Hat, Beyond the Fringe) to dramas (84 Charing Cross Road, Anna Christie) to musicals (Dear World, A Day in Hollywood / A Night in the Ukraine) to the classics (King Lear, Hamlet). He also produced stage concerts for Marlene Dietrich, Maurice Chevalier, and Yves Montand, and an evening of comic sketches with Mike Nichols and Elaine May.

Cohen was responsible for the international stardom of Marcel Marceau, bringing him to New York to support Maurice Chevalier in An Evening with Maurice Chevalier. He had originally intended the production to be a one-man show but Chevalier did not want to work that hard, and requested that Marceau (then unknown outside Europe) perform his mime pieces to give Chevalier opportunities to rest between musical numbers.

His informal series of revues collectively titled "Nine O'Clock Musicals" included At the Drop of a Hat and At the Drop of Another Hat (both featuring Michael Flanders and Donald Swann, Words and Music (Hollywood lyricist Sammy Cahn performing his own songs with a few back-up singers) and the semi-musical Good Evening with Peter Cook and Dudley Moore. They were low-budget, required little material support, and were hugely successful.

Despite his success with revues, Cohen never produced a financially successful book musical (a musical with a script and plot) on Broadway, although he did produce the successful London productions of 1776 and Applause.

A challenge he was never able to satisfy was to mount a Broadway revival of the Olsen and Johnson show Hellzapoppin'. A days-long 1967 revival was staged for the Expo 67 world's fair in Montreal, Canada; the show starred Soupy Sales and Will B. Able (Willard Achorn). In 1972 Cohen tabled his Broadway plans in favor of a one-hour TV special starring Jack Cassidy, Ronnie Schell, and Lynn Redgrave. Redgrave was signed for a 1977 Hellzpoppin, bound for Broadway, but star Jerry Lewis dominated the production onstage and off, causing serious arguments with Cohen, Redgrave, and writer-adaptor Abe Burrows. Cohen abruptly closed the show in Boston and forfeited a million-dollar payment from the National Broadcasting Company televise the opening night on Broadway. As reported by columnist Dan Lewis, "Those close to the producer expressed doubt that he would recast or revive the project -- that it was indeed a dead issue." The rights are still held by the Cohen estate.

The nearest Cohen came to a successful book musical on Broadway was A Day in Hollywood/A Night in the Ukraine, adapted from a much less elaborate London production. This double feature consisted of two short entertainments with the same cast: the first half being a plotless compendium of songs and anecdotes about old-time Hollywood, the second half being Anton Chekhov's play The Bear radically reworked as a musical comedy for the Marx Brothers (impersonated by modern actors), retaining a vague semblance of Chekhov's plot.

== Television production ==
Cohen conceived and originated the first Tony Awards telecast in 1967 and helmed many more over the following years. He also produced a number of Emmy Award presentations, specials with Plácido Domingo and Liza Minnelli, and the first and third editions of Night of 100 Stars, which featured a parade of entertainment and sports celebrities performing and/or appearing on the stage of Radio City Music Hall.

== Other work ==
As well as producing, Cohen participated in the operation of a number of legitimate theaters, including the Morris Mechanic in Baltimore after its renovation, and the O'Keefe Centre in Toronto when it opened in 1960.

He was responsible for drawing the performing arts community into the popular and highly successful I Love New York television ad campaign. In 1976, he converted the bankrupt and vacant Manhattan Plaza on Manhattan's West 43rd Street into an apartment complex providing subsidized housing for low-income performers.

Cohen was also an active fund-raiser for the Actors Fund of America. He put together several television spectaculars, Night of 100 Stars and Parade of Stars which raised $3 million to build the fund's extended-care nursing facility in Englewood, N.J. Behind the scenes, however, there was controversy, some claiming that Cohen's lavish producing style accommodated his own lavish needs better than the fund's.

Cohen made one appearance as an actor when he appeared onscreen in Woody Allen's film The Purple Rose of Cairo (1985), portraying Raoul Hirsch, a fictional Hollywood producer in the 1930s. His final act, putting it all together, was in 1999 when he wrote, produced, directed, and starred in his off-Broadway one-man show, Star Billing, in which he reminisced about his hits, flops, and famous feuds. The New York Times reviewer stated that he had many a kind word for his friends and an arsenal of well-honed, acid-tipped barbs for those he loathed, among them rival producer David Merrick, Marlene Dietrich and Jerry Lewis. Theater

== Selected Broadway credits ==
- Waiting in the Wings (1999)
- Sacrilege (1995)
- Ah, Wilderness! (1988 revival)
- Long Day's Journey Into Night (1988 revival)
- Accidental Death of an Anarchist (1984)
- Edmund Kean (1983)
- Very Good Idi (1980)
- I Remember Mama (1979)
- Comedians (1976)
- 6 Rms Riv Vu (1972)
- The Unknown Soldier and His Wife (1967)
- Black Comedy/White Lies (1967)
- The Homecoming (1967)
- A Time for Singing (1966)
- At the Drop of Another Hat (1966)
- Baker Street (1965)
- Hamlet (1964 revival with Richard Burton. This is still the longest-running Broadway staging of the play ever produced, outrunning Maurice Evans's 1945 G.I. Hamlet by only a few performances)
- The School for Scandal (1963 revival)
- Beyond the Fringe (1962)
- At the Drop of a Hat (1959)
- Gentlemen Prefer Blondes (1949)

== Awards and nominations ==
- 2000 Drama Desk Award for Lifetime Achievement (awarded posthumously)
- 1999 Drama Desk Award for Outstanding Solo Performance (Star Billing, nominee)
- 1989 Tony Award for Best Revival (Ah, Wilderness!, nominee)
- 1989 Drama Desk Award for Outstanding Revival (Long Day's Journey Into Night, nominee)
- 1984 Tony Award for Best Play (Play Memory, nominee)
- 1984 Drama Desk Award for Unique Theatrical Experience (La Tragedie de Carmen, winner)
- 1980 Tony Award for Best Musical (A Day in Hollywood/A Night in the Ukraine, nominee)
- 1977 Drama Desk Award for Outstanding New Foreign Play (Comedians, nominee)
- 1974 Tony Award for Best Play (Ulysses in Nighttown, nominee)
- 1973 Theatre World Award (for his contribution to cultivating theater audiences by extending Broadway not only nationally, but internationally, with his exemplary television productions)
- 1971 Tony Award for Best Play (Home, nominee)
- 1967 Tony Award for Best Play (The Homecoming, winner)
- 1967 Tony Award for Best Play (Black Comedy/White Lies, nominee)
