= Mama (American TV series) =

- The original cast
- Genre: Comedy drama
- Based on: Mama's Bank Account
- Written by: Frank Gabrielson and others
- Starring: Peggy Wood; Judson Laire; Rosemary Rice; Dick Van Patten
- Theme music composer: Edvard Grieg
- Opening theme: Holberg Suite
- Ending theme: The Last Spring
- Composer: Billy Nalle
- Country of origin: United States
- No. of seasons: 8

Production
- Producers: Ralph Nelson; Carol Irwin

Original release
- Network: CBS
- Release: July 1, 1949 – March 17, 1957

Mama is a weekly CBS Television comedy-drama series that ran from July 1, 1949, until March 17, 1957. The series was based on the 1943 novel Mama's Bank Account by Kathryn Forbes, which was also adapted for the John Van Druten play (1944) and the subsequent film I Remember Mama (1948). It told the ongoing story of a loving Norwegian family living in San Francisco in the 1910s as seen through the eyes of the elder daughter, Katrin Hansen (Rosemary Rice).

At the start of each episode, Katrin would be shown looking through the pages of the family album, with the opening narration:

This old album makes me remember so many things in the past. San Francisco and the house on Steiner Street where I was born. It brings back memories of my cousins, aunts and uncles; all the boys and girls I grew up with. And I remember my family as we were then. My big brother Nels, my little sister Dagmar, and of course, Papa. But most of all, when I look back to those days so long ago, most of all, I remember ... Mama.

The show was originally broadcast live from CBS Studio 41 above the 42nd Street waiting room in Manhattan's Grand Central Terminal and was sponsored by Maxwell House and Post Cereal.

== Characters and story ==
In addition to veteran stage actress Peggy Wood in the title role of Marta Hansen and Rosemary Rice as Katrin, the cast included Judson Laire as Papa and Dick Van Patten as brother Nels. The youngest child, Dagmar, was portrayed by Robin Morgan (who later became a radical feminist activist and poet) and then by Toni Campbell after Morgan left the show. Also featured were Ruth Gates (as Aunt Jenny), Carl Frank, Alice Frost, Malcolm Keen, Roland Winters, Kevin Coughlin and Patty McCormack. Gates was the only member of the cast to have played her role in the original Broadway production in 1944.

The series was different from the play and film in that there were only three children instead of four, with the character of daughter Christine being eliminated. Also, Mama had two sisters instead of three, consisting of Jenny and, occasionally, Trina – Sigrid was never seen or referred to. The character of Mama's Uncle Chris (played by Roland Winters) made a few appearances on the program, but the character of Mr. Hyde was deleted from the series. However, in a 1957 episode, "The Seventh Age", a character was featured with a different name - Mr. Carlysle (played by actor Bramwell Fletcher) - who was very similar to Mr. Hyde, in that he was a kind man, although a down and out, penniless, aging actor whom the Hansens took in as a boarder.

Although earlier incarnations of I Remember Mama had focused primarily on the relationship between Marta and Katrin, the television series typically dealt with a specific family member's problem and eventually drew the whole family into helping with its resolution.

The program aired live, and kinescope recordings were prepared for West Coast broadcasts. The popularity and high ratings of Mama prompted a national re-release of the I Remember Mama film in 1956. In some theaters, this reissue included a stage presentation of "Dish Night", a recreation of the dinnerware giveaways theaters held during the 1930s to attract ticket-buyers.

From its premiere in 1949 to 1956, Mama proved to be not only a ratings winner for CBS, but it also became a Friday night tradition when millions of families across America (including children already dressed for bed) gathered around the television set at 8:00PM to tune into another episode of the Hansen family.

== From live to film ==
By the end of the 1955–56 season, even though the ratings for Mama were still respectable, viewership had decreased; Maxwell House, who co-sponsored the show, complained that not enough viewers were buying their coffee. This complaint led to CBS's cancellation of the show in July 1956. Carol Irwin, the show's producer, urged viewers to write the network demanding a return of the show. As a result, 175,000 letters poured into CBS, and the network immediately renewed the show. Unfortunately, with the prime-time schedule already filled, CBS scheduled Mama at 5:00pm on Sunday afternoons beginning December 16, 1956. This time, 26 episodes were filmed. The entire cast was reunited with the exception of actress Robin Morgan, who had portrayed the youngest daughter Dagmar beginning in 1950. Morgan opted not to continue with the role, wanting to pursue writing rather than acting. So, when Mama returned to CBS in December, 1956, the role of Dagmar was played by actress Toni Campbell. However, because of its less-than-desirable new time slot, Mama's ratings plummeted to the point of ultimately terminating its run three months later in March 1957, with several episodes left unaired.

Nevertheless, after eight years of playing Marta Hansen, Peggy Wood was honored with her first Emmy nomination as best actress in a drama series. Her first nomination was for her work on Mama during the 1952–1953 television season. (The series itself was nominated in 1951 for Best Dramatic Show.) It was during this season that the orchestral accordionist John Serry Sr. collaborated with Peggy Wood on the show. Even though she did not win on the night of the 1956–57 Emmy Awards, in admiration for the long-running success of Mama and the great affection the public felt for Wood, the Television Academy asked her to present the last award of the evening: Best Single Program of the Year, which went to Playhouse 90's Requiem for a Heavyweight.

In the fall of 1957, the complete 1956–57 filmed season of Mama aired on New York's WPIX-TV Channel 11. However, as the live (kinescoped) episodes are largely lost, Mama is unfamiliar to later generations of viewers. The aforementioned 26 filmed episodes from the last season of the show have occasionally been screened on public access stations.

In 1985, the Museum of Broadcasting in New York City presented a retrospective of Mama by arranging screenings of several of the live television broadcasts (1949–56), which had been donated by various sources, as well as a seminar featuring the three actors who played the Hansen children - Rosemary Rice (Katrin), Dick Van Patten (Nels), Robin Morgan (Dagmar) - and longtime director, Ralph Nelson. The Museum also discovered all 26 episodes of the filmed season of Mama (1956–57) in a CBS storage facility in New Jersey; not only did these episodes become part of the screening exhibition, but they were also added to the Museum's collection. Rice donated several kinescopes she kept from the show for the exhibition.

The opening and closing musical pieces were the "Holberg Suite" and "The Last Spring" by the Norwegian composer Edvard Grieg. Director-producer Ralph Nelson, himself of Norwegian descent, went on to direct the film Lilies of the Field.

== Awards ==
The series received three Emmy nominations: one in 1951 for Best Dramatic Show and two for Peggy Wood's performance in 1953 and 1957.

== Ratings ==
Mama was one of the first TV sitcoms to consistently finish in the Nielsen ratings' top 30 after they were instituted in the 1950–1951 season:

1. 1950–1951: #10
2. 1951–1952: #11
3. 1952–1953: #18
4. 1953–1954: #26

In the 1954–1955 seasons and afterward, Mama was not in the top 30 and its ratings data are not available.
