= Hildy Parks =

American actress (1926–2004)

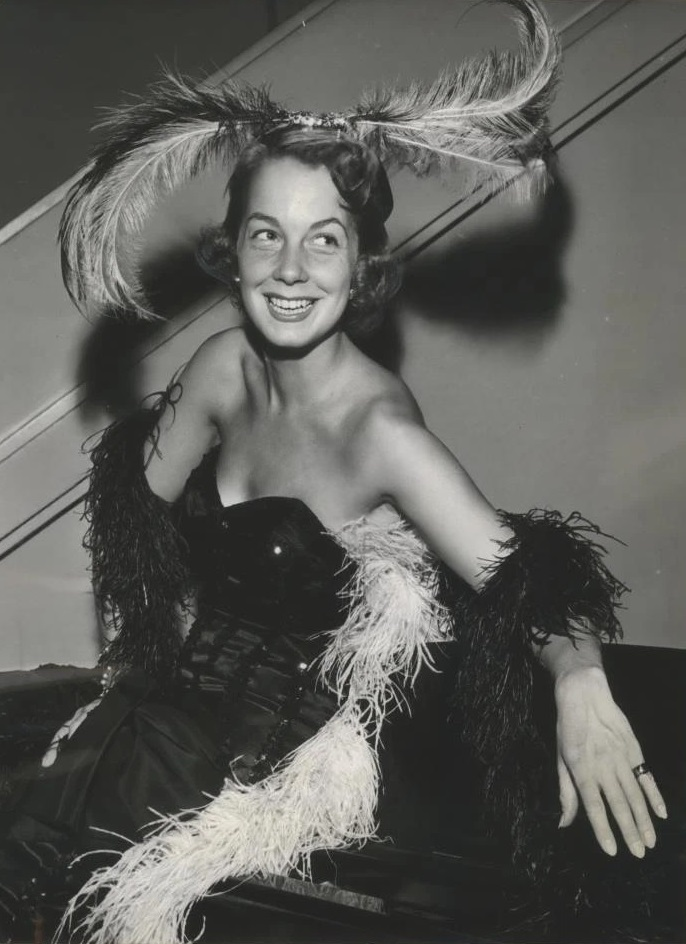
- Parks in 1954
- Born: March 12, 1926; Washington, D.C., U.S.
- Died: October 7, 2004 (aged 78); Englewood, New Jersey, U.S.
- Occupations: Actress, writer
- Years active: 1947–2004
- Spouses: Jackie Cooper (1950–1951; divorced); Alexander H. Cohen (1956–2000; his death)
- Children: 3

Hildy Parks (March 12, 1926 – October 7, 2004) was an American actress and writer for television programs.

== Early years ==
Parks was born in Washington, D.C., the daughter of Cleo (Scanland) and Steve McNeil Parks.

== Career ==
Parks's Broadway debut came in Bathsheba (1947). She also was involved in production of at least 29 Broadway plays.

Parks made her screen debut in The Night Holds Terror (1955) opposite Jack Kelly, Vince Edwards, but her film career was sporadic, with minor appearances in Fail-Safe (1964), Seven Days in May (1964), and The Group (1966).

Her television career included portraying Ellie Crown in the daytime soap opera Love of Life from its 1951 debut until 1955; appearances in such prime-time dramatic anthology series as Armstrong Circle Theatre, Robert Montgomery Presents, Kraft Television Theatre, and Studio One; and as a recurring panelist on the game shows To Tell the Truth and Down You Go.

Parks and her husband, Alexander H. Cohen, produced broadcasts of ACE Awards, Tony Awards, and Emmy Awards. They also produced, and Parks wrote, the week-long CBS: On the Air retrospective for the network's 50th anniversary.

== Personal life ==
Parks was married to actor Jackie Cooper. She later married Broadway producer Alexander H. Cohen, with whom she had two sons and a daughter.

== Death ==
Parks died at age 78 at the Lillian Booth Actors Home in Englewood, New Jersey, from complications following a stroke.
