= Eve Golden =

American biographer

Eve Golden is a biographer whose work focuses on American silent film, theater and early twentieth century actresses. She was born and raised near Philadelphia, Pennsylvania.

== Bibliography ==
Eve Golden is the author of seven theater and film biographies.

- Platinum Girl: The Life and Legends of Jean Harlow (1991)
- Vamp: The Rise and Fall of Theda Bara (1997)
- Golden Images: 41 Essays on Silent Film Stars (1998)
- Anna Held and the Birth of Ziegfeld's Broadway (2000)
- The Brief, Madcap Life of Kay Kendall (2002)
- Vernon and Irene Castle's Ragtime Revolution (2007)
- Bride of Golden Images: Essays on Stars of the 1930s-60s (2009)
- John Gilbert: The Last of the Silent Film Stars (2013)
- Jayne Mansfield: The Girl Couldn't Help It (2021)
