= Peggy Wood =

American actress (1892–1978)

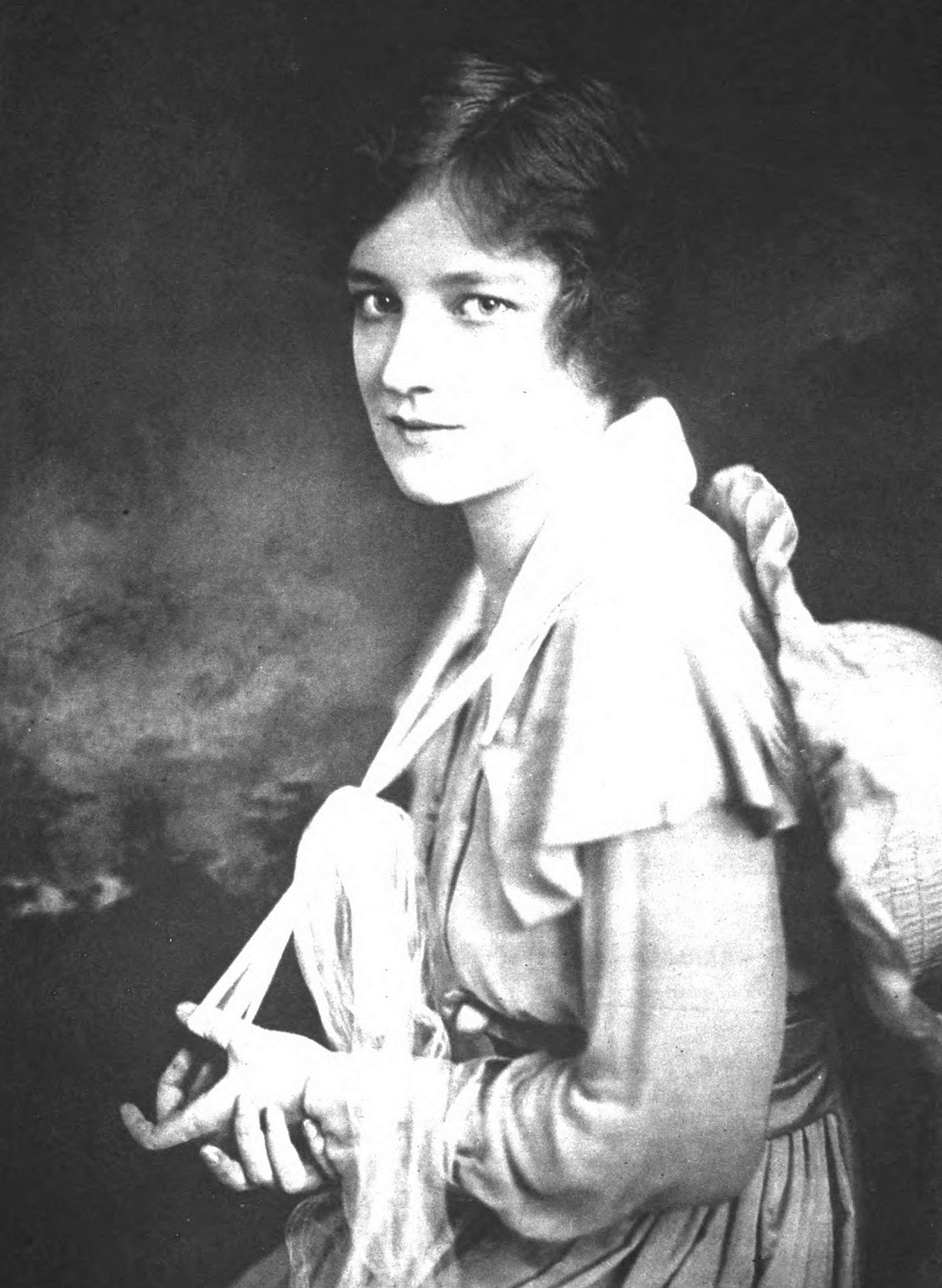
- Photograph of Wood in 1917
- Born: Mary Margaret Wood; February 9, 1892; Brooklyn, New York, U.S.
- Died: March 18, 1978 (aged 86); Stamford, Connecticut, U.S.
- Occupations: Actress, singer
- Years active: 1910–1969
- Spouses: John Weaver (m. 1924; died 1938) William Walling (m. 1946; died 1973)
- Children: 1

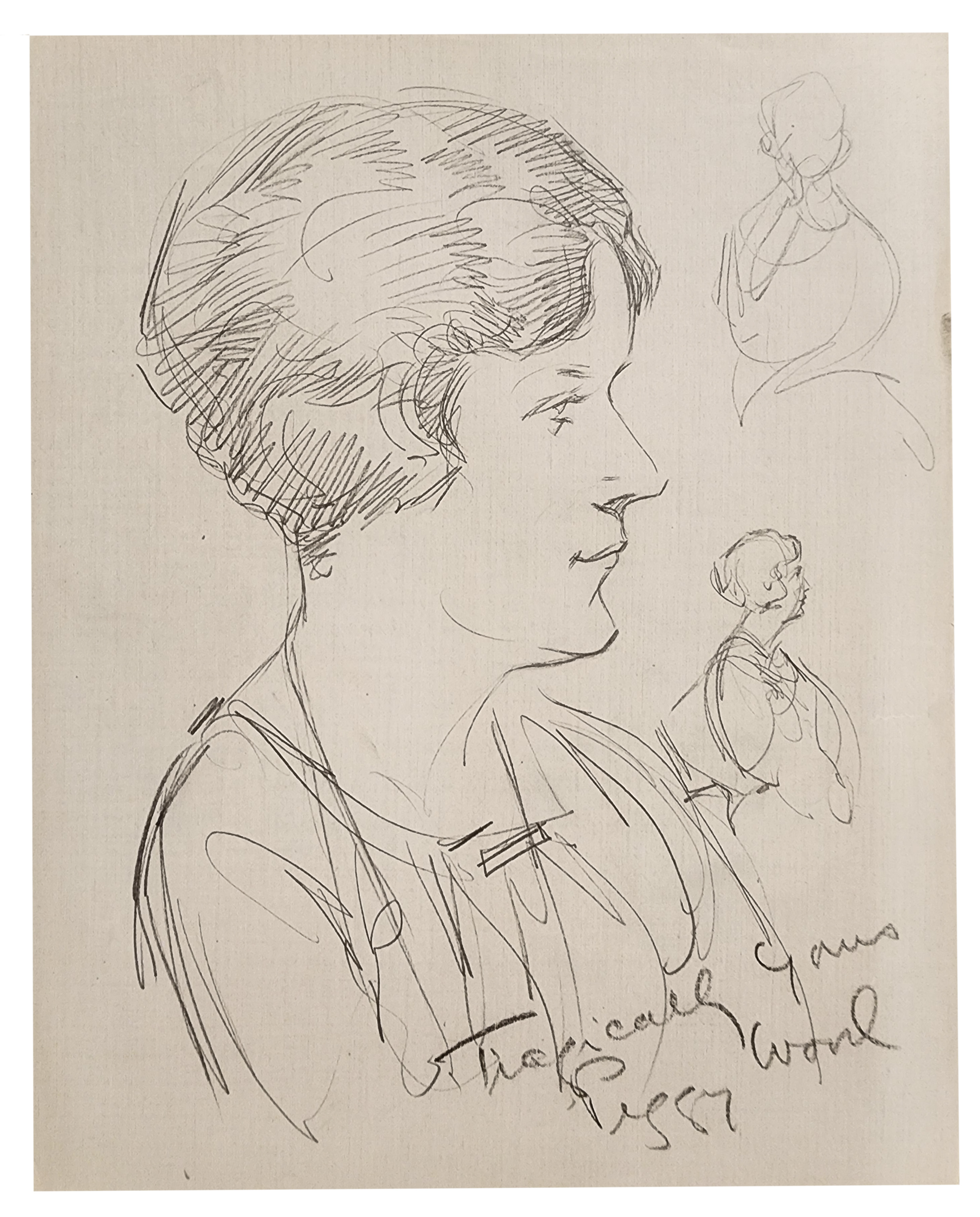
Signed drawing by Manuel Rosenberg 1923

Mary Margaret Wood (February 9, 1892 – March 18, 1978) was an American actress of stage, film, and television. She is best remembered for her performance as the title character in the CBS television series Mama (1949–1957), for which she was nominated for a Primetime Emmy Award for Outstanding Lead Actress in a Drama Series; her starring role as Naomi, Ruth's mother-in-law, in The Story of Ruth (1960); and her final screen appearance as Mother Abbess in The Sound of Music (1965), for which she received nominations for both an Academy Award and a Golden Globe Award.

== Career ==
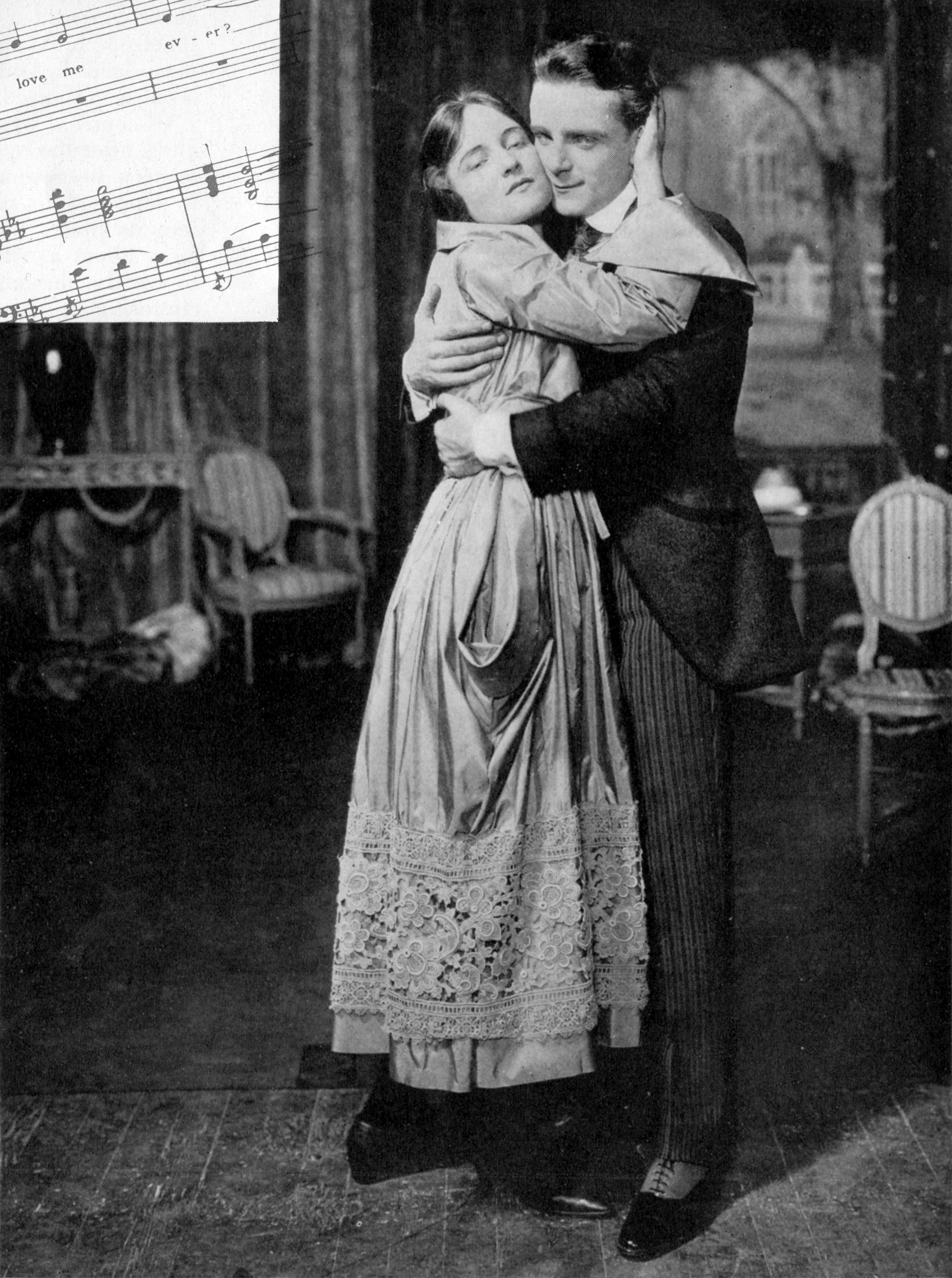
Peggy Wood and Charles Purcell in the original Broadway production of Maytime (1917)

Mary Margaret Wood was born in Brooklyn, New York, the daughter of Eugene Wood, a journalist, and Mary Gardner, a telegraph operator. She studied voice in France with soprano Emma Calvé. Wood was an early member of the Actors' Equity Association, spending nearly 50 years onstage, beginning in the chorus and becoming known as a Broadway singer and star. Wood made her stage debut in 1910, as part of the chorus for Naughty Marietta. In 1917, she starred in Maytime, in which she introduced the song "Will You Remember". She starred in several other musicals before playing the role of Portia in a 1928 production of The Merchant of Venice. From the late 1920s until the late 1930s, Wood had lead roles in musicals staged in London and New York. She was selected by Noël Coward to star in the original London production of his wildly successful operetta Bitter Sweet.

According to a 1920 profile, Wood also wrote plays "in collaboration with her father and with Samuel Merwin." She was a member of the Algonquin Round Table.

In 1941, she starred in the New York premiere of Blithe Spirit as Ruth Condomine, whose husband is tormented by the ghost of his deceased first wife. Wood did not star in many films. Her few film appearances include roles in Jalna, A Star Is Born, Call It a Day, The Housekeeper's Daughter, The Bride Wore Boots, Magnificent Doll, and Dream Girl. From 1949 to 1957, she played matriarch Marta Hansen on the popular series Mama, based on the 1943 Broadway play and 1948 film I Remember Mama. When General Foods cancelled the program, there was so much protest that CBS brought it back on Sunday afternoon, this time as a filmed series. As the network did not have all the affiliate station clearances that were needed, the show was put into syndication, where it was a huge success. Producers filmed 26 episodes.

Following "Mama", Wood was seen in episodes of Zane Grey Theatre and The Nurses. She co-starred with comedian Imogene Coca on Broadway in The Girls in 509. In October 1963, she and Ruth Gates appeared in the one-act play Opening Night, which played in off-Broadway. Wood portrayed Fanny Ellis, a once famous star who prepares for a performance; the play lasted 47 performances. Gates played "Aunt Jenny" on Mama, which starred Wood.

Wood returned to movies in the 1960 CinemaScope production The Story of Ruth in a co-starring role as the mother-in-law, Naomi, of the title character, although she pointed out the lack of verisimilitude in her own casting as a biblical matriarch, i.e. a "blonde, blue-eyed Jewess". Her final screen appearance was as the Mother Abbess in The Sound of Music (1965), for which she was nominated for the Academy Award for Best Supporting Actress and the Golden Globe Award for Best Supporting Actress - Motion Picture. She was thrilled to be in the movie, but she knew she could no longer sing "Climb Ev'ry Mountain". She was dubbed (for singing) by Margery MacKay. In her autobiography, Marni Nixon, who appeared in the film as Sister Sophia, said Peggy especially liked McKay's singing voice because she sounded as Peggy did in her younger days. In 1969, Wood joined the cast of One Life to Live as Dr. Kate Nolan, and had a recurring role until the end of the year.

== Other ==
Her first autobiography How Young You Look was published by Farrar and Rinehart in 1941. The updated version Arts and Flowers appeared in 1963. She wrote a biography of actor John Drew, Jr. and a novel titled The Star Wagon as well as co-wrote the play Miss Quis. Wood received numerous awards for her theatrical work and for a while was president of the American National Theater and Academy (ANTA).

== Personal life ==
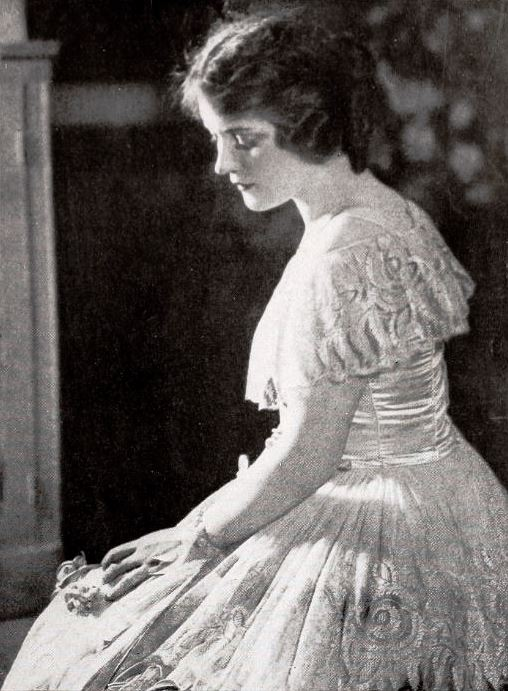
Actress Peggy Wood in Shadowland

Wood was married and widowed twice. Her first husband (poet/writer John Van Alstyne Weaver) died at the age of 44. She gave birth to their son (David Weaver) in 1927 at the age of 35. Her second husband (William H. Walling, whom she wed in 1946) was an executive in the printing business who died in 1973. They were married for 27 years. She was a devout Episcopalian and a member of the Episcopal Actors Guild.

== Death ==
Wood died on March 18, 1978, at age 86, in Stamford, Connecticut, following a stroke.

== Filmography ==
=== Film ===
Year	Title	Role	Notes
1919	Almost a Husband	Eva McElwyn	Lost film
1929	Wonder of Women	Brigitte	Lost film
1934	Handy Andy	Ernestine Yates	
1935	The Right to Live	Nurse Wayland	
1935	Jalna	Meg Whiteoaks	
1937	Call It a Day	Ethel Francis	
1937	A Star Is Born	Miss Phillips (clerk in Central Casting)	
1939	The Housekeeper's Daughter	Olga	
1946	The Bride Wore Boots	Grace Apley	
1946	Magnificent Doll	Mrs. Payne	
1948	Dream Girl	Lucy Allerton	
1960	The Story of Ruth	Naomi	
1965	The Sound of Music	The Reverend Mother Abbess	Nominated—Academy Award for Best Supporting Actress; Nominated—Golden Globe Award for Best Supporting Actress – Motion Picture

=== Television ===
Year	Title	Role	Notes
1948	The Philco Television Playhouse	Mrs. Oliver Jordan	episode: Dinner at Eight
1949	The Philco Television Playhouse	Florence McDavid	episode: Dark Hammock
1951	Pulitzer Prize Playhouse	Gladys	episode: The Skin of Our Teeth
1949–1957	Mama	Mama; Marta Hansen	10 episodes Nominated—Primetime Emmy Award for Best Actress (1953); Nominated—Primetime Emmy Award for Outstanding Continuing Performance by an Actress in a Dramatic Series (1957)
1957	Zane Grey Theatre	Sarah Jolland	episode: The Bitter Land
1959	The United States Steel Hour	Lillian Granet	episode: Seed of Guilt
1962	Dr. Kildare	Katie Harris	episode: An Ancient Office
1963	The Doctors and the Nurses	Marcella Higgins	episode: The Saturday Evening of Time
1965	For the People	Mrs. Murray	episode: The Killing of One Human Being
1969	One Life to Live	Dr. Kate Nolan	Unknown episodes

== Stage (partial list of appearances) ==
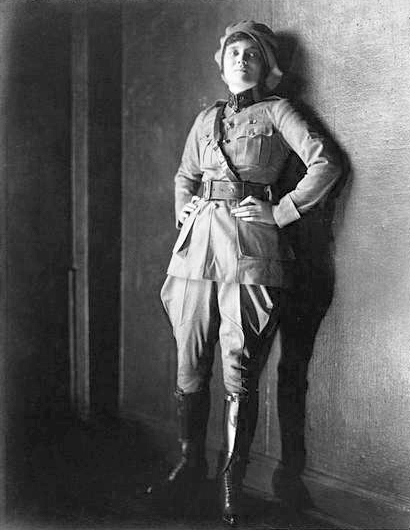
Peggy Wood in Buddies (1919)

- Love O' Mike (1917)
- Maytime (1917)
- Buddies (1919)
- Bitter Sweet (1929)
- Old Acquaintance (1940)
- Blithe Spirit (1941)
