= George Stevens =

American filmmaker (1904–1975)

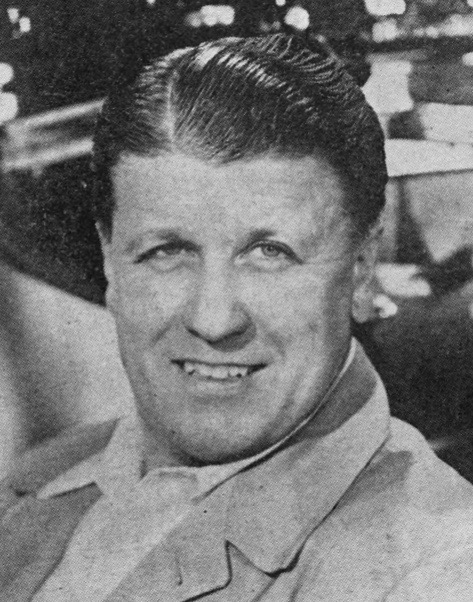
- Stevens in 1952
- Born: George Cooper Stevens; December 18, 1904; Oakland, California, U.S.
- Died: March 8, 1975 (aged 70); Lancaster, California, U.S.
- Resting place: Forest Lawn Memorial Park, Hollywood Hills
- Occupations: Film director; producer; cinematographer; screenwriter
- Years active: 1915–1970
- Spouse(s): Yvonne Howell (m. 1930; div. 1947) Joan McTavish (m. 1968)
- Children: George Stevens, Jr.
- Awards: Full list
- Military career
- Allegiance: United States
- Branch: United States Army
- Service years: 1943–1946
- Rank: Lieutenant Colonel
- Unit: Army Signal Corps
- Conflicts: World War II: European Theater
- Awards: Legion of Merit; American Campaign Medal; European–African–Middle Eastern Campaign Medal; World War II Victory Medal

George Cooper Stevens (December 18, 1904 – March 8, 1975) was an American filmmaker. A prominent figure of the classical Hollywood era, Stevens demonstrated versatility across film genres, deep humanism, and visual precision. He won two Academy Awards for Best Director for A Place in the Sun (1951) and Giant (1956). He later became known for meticulously shooting coverage of a scene from every conceivable angle.

Born in Oakland, California, George Stevens worked for his parents' West Coast touring stock theater company as an actor and stage manager. When cinema was replacing live theater, Stevens's parents relocated to Los Angeles. At the age of 17, Stevens was hired as an assistant cameraman and worked on several Western films produced by Hal Roach. Within three years, Stevens became a cameraman on the Our Gang series. Impressed with Stevens's visual knowledge, Roach then appointed him to direct installments of The Boy Friends series.

Stevens next moved to Universal Pictures and then to RKO Pictures. There, he directed several genre films, including Alice Adams starring Katharine Hepburn; Swing Time starring Fred Astaire and Ginger Rogers; and Gunga Din starring Cary Grant. Stevens was loaned to MGM to direct Woman of the Year (1942) based on Hepburn's suggestion, whereby she was paired with Spencer Tracy for the first time. He also directed The Talk of the Town (1942) and The More the Merrier (1943).

In 1941, as the United States entered World War II, Stevens joined the U.S. Army Signal Corps. As the leader of a film unit, Stevens used his personal 16 mm film camera to capture footage of the Liberation of Paris and the entry of American soldiers into the Dachau concentration camp. Stevens later returned to Hollywood and directed more dramatic films such as I Remember Mama (1948).

Between 1951 and 1956, Stevens directed his American Trilogy, which includes A Place in the Sun (1951), Shane (1953), and Giant (1956). He next directed widescreen biographical films, The Diary of Anne Frank (1959) and The Greatest Story Ever Told (1965). His final film was The Only Game in Town (1970), which starred Elizabeth Taylor and Warren Beatty. Stevens died on March 8, 1975, at the age of 70.

== Early life ==
Stevens was born on December 18, 1904, in Oakland, California, the son of Landers Stevens and Georgie Cooper, both stage actors. A brother of theatre critic Ashton Stevens, Landers Stevens began his acting career at age 20, and established his own theatrical stock company when he was 24. Landers met Cooper where she was performing at the Tivoli Theatre in San Francisco, and the two were married in 1902.

George had two brothers, Jack, a cinematographer, and writer Aston Stevens. He learned about the stage by watching his parents, and himself, acting in plays in San Francisco. George remembered, "As a kid I helped my father, setting up the entrances and marking the script and holding the lines. Because he was usually acting in the play and because he also was directing, I helped, holding the script."

At the age of 5, George made his stage debut in the play Sappho, appearing alongside Nance O'Neill, at the Alcazar Theatre. At the age of 10, his mother gave him a Brownie camera, and he began photographing the city and portraits of his mother. Landers's theatre troupe toured throughout the West Coast, Utah, Vancouver, and Canada. By 1920, the theatre stock company had waned in popularity, and Stevens's parents set up a tent show in downtown San Francisco.

Stevens's parents relocated to Sonoma County, California, where Jack and George were enrolled in the Flowery School and then Sonora Union High School. The 1920–1921 theatre season was financially unsuccessful, so much that Landers closed his theatre company. Decades later, George reflected: "A movie palace was built right across the street from the theatre where my father worked. First one was built on this corner, then one was built on that corner, and the people were going to them in great numbers. I remember my father peeking out through the brass ring before the curtain went up on his stage show, and there weren't many people out front."

In 1921, the family relocated once more to Glendale so Landers could pursue work in Hollywood. By the age of 16, George was forced to drop out of high school to drive his father to acting auditions. To compensate for his lack of a formal education, George regularly visited the Glendale Public Library.

== Career ==
=== 1922–1933: Assistant cameraman ===
"There were no unions, so it was possible to become an assistant cameraman if you happened to find out just when they were starting a picture. There was no organization; if a cameraman didn't have an assistant, he didn't know where to find one. [...] One day, I climbed the fence, knowing they needed an assistant cameraman. I told them I was an assistant cameraman. A couple of days later, I was one, but the first day or two it was pretty disastrous."

— Stevens, in a 1970 interview with Leonard Maltin

Stevens worked as an assistant cameraman on Heroes of the Street (1922), a silent drama directed by William Beaudine. He then moved to Ince Studio where he worked on The Destroying Angel (1923) and several Westerns, including The Virginian (1923) released by Preferred Pictures. He was an uncredited assistant cameraman on the 1923 short film Roughest Africa, starring Stan Laurel.

At the age of 17, Stevens was employed at Hal Roach Studios as an assistant cameraman to Fred Jackman. His first project was The Battling Orioles (1923) and was followed by The White Sheep (1924). Within a year, Stevens worked on Black Cyclone (1924), an installment of a silent Western film serial featuring Rex the Wonder Horse.

The next installment was The Devil Horse (1925). Directed by Fred Jackman, Stevens was one of the two cameramen, collaborating with Floyd Jackman (Fred's brother). While trick photography had been used previously, Stevens experimented with using filters on the panchromatic film, by which he filtered "the sky black for night sequences, instead of just tinting it blue, and using long telephoto lenses to bring the background up, things that a kid would do."

The Jackman brothers left Hal Roach Studios, but Stevens stayed to photograph a series of short comedies starring Laurel and Hardy. Oliver Hardy had been under contract with the studio, but Roach hired Stan Laurel from Universal Pictures to write gag stories. Stevens's first project with the duo was Slipping Wives (1927), whereby he worked as director of photography and a gag writer on 35 of their short films, including Bacon Grabbers (1929) and Night Owls (1930). According to Stevens, he learned from this experience that comedy could be "graceful and human".

Filming for one short proved difficult when Laurel's blue eyes failed to register on orthochromatic film, but Stevens made a successful test of him using panchromatic film. By 1930, Stevens began directing film serial installments of The Boy Friends. At one point, Stevens grew tired of directing two-reel gag comedies and refused to direct another film that Roach had asked him. He told Leonard Maltin, in 1970: "[Roach] told me a story he wanted me to do. I couldn't see it at all, and I'd just started on something else. So I thought it over, and I said, 'Hal, I can't do it. I don't understand it.'" A half-hour later, Stevens was informed by a studio manager that he was fired, with the termination effective on New Year's Eve 1931.

=== 1933–1935: Early feature works ===
Six months later, Stevens was hired by Universal Pictures and collaborated with Warren Doane, a former Roach general manager, and James W. Horne, Stevens's cousin, on several two-reel comedies, such as Yoo Hoo (1932) and Should Crooners Marry? (1933). These comedies featured several actors, including James Gleason, Richard "Skeets" Gallagher, Louise Fazenda, and Vince Barnett. Impressed with Stevens's efficiency, Universal hired Stevens to direct his first feature film, The Cohens and Kellys in Trouble (1933), the final installment of The Cohens and Kellys comedy serials, which had starred George Sidney and Charles Murray. Principal photography began in December 1932 and wrapped in March 1933.

When asked about his directorial process, in an interview with the Los Angeles Daily News, Stevens stated: "In reading over a screenplay I constantly look for the little things of a story; small situations, common incidents, or places where the shrug of a shoulder properly done will give an audience a chance to laugh. For, despite the prolonged depression, everyone is still anxious to laugh." Later that same year, Stevens signed a contract with RKO Pictures with an eight-month guarantee to direct six shorts and one feature film. In September 1933, RKO loaned Stevens to Metro-Goldwyn-Mayer (MGM) to direct a segment featuring Laurel and Hardy in Hollywood Party (1934).

In 1934, Stevens returned to RKO to direct Bachelor Bait, which he filmed from April 30 to May 18. The film starred Stuart Erwin, portraying a kind-hearted man who loses his job at a marriage license office. He then opens Romance Inc., his own matrimonial agency, where he falls in love with a wealthy client, played by Grace Sutton. The Hollywood Reporter called the film "[a] nice, pleasant little comedy that takes time out every once in a while to bowl you over completely with several hilarious wisecracks, thrown in amongst the mild humor which is its general tone." His next film was Kentucky Kernels (1934) starred the comedy duo of Bert Wheeler and Robert Woolsey (collectively known as Wheeler and Woolsey), playing out-of-work men living on a decrepit houseboat and hope to earn money by catching fish. Along the way, they adopt a young boy (Spanky McFarland) who inherits a fortune, while they head for Kentucky, where two families are locked in a bitter feud.

Stevens's next film was Laddie (1935), an adaptation of the 1913 novel Laddie: A True Blue Story by Gene Stratton-Porter. The novel had been previously adapted into a 1926 film. Produced at RKO, George Nicholls Jr. had been set to direct, but it was reassigned to Stevens. Set in the late 19th-century rural Indiana, John Beal stars in the title role as a farmer who falls in love with his English neighbor, Pamela Pryor (Gloria Stuart), but their romance is opposed by Pryor's father (Donald Crisp). The film premiered at the Hilbert Circle Theatre, and was well received by critics and audiences.

Stevens then re-teamed with Wheeler and Woolsey on The Nitwits (1935). The duo, along with Betty Grable, portray three record company employees who are unwittingly involved in a murder plot as a mysterious serial killer lurks in New York.

=== 1935–1943: Established director ===
Meanwhile, Pandro S. Berman proceeded on a film vehicle for Katharine Hepburn and selected the 1921 novel Alice Adams by Booth Tarkington. Hepburn admired the novel, and both she and Berman settled on either William Wyler and George Stevens to direct. Hepburn and Berman tossed coins, and Wyler won the first contest. Hepburn went with Stevens, and the coin was tossed in her favor. Before he had time to read Tarkington's novel, Stevens drove over to Hepburn's residence. In a meeting with Hepburn and Berman, he attempted to fake his way around discussing the novel. Unimpressed, Hepburn reportedly told Berman the next day that Stevens was the dumbest man she had met. Berman phoned Stevens stating, "Kate says you had a very pleasant evening, but you didn't say a word about the picture. That puts me in a very difficult situation."

Stevens then read the novel, and within a day, he agreed to direct Alice Adams (1935). He was displeased having read two-thirds of Jane Murfin's script adaptation, and promptly hired Mortimer Offner and Dorothy Yost to rewrite it, retaining much of the novel's dialogue. Principal photography began on May 22, 1935, and wrapped on June 29. However, the novel's original ending concluded with Alice deciding to attend a secretarial school. Murfin's script instead had Alice expressing her love with Arthur. Hepburn and Stevens had opposed the ending, though RKO insisted on the happier ending even before Stevens was hired. During post-production, Stevens and Berman exchanged memos defending their stance. Berman brought in George Cukor to decide, and he felt the novel's ending would be box office poison.

Alice Adams opened at the Radio City Music Hall on August 15, 1935. Andre Sennwald of The New York Times applauded Hepburn's performance and Stevens's direction, writing, "An oddly exciting blend of tenderness, comedy and realistic despair, [the film] touches life intimately at many points during its account of a lonely girl in a typical American small town." At the 8th Academy Awards, the film was nominated for Best Picture, and Hepburn was nominated for Best Actress.

After a successful preview of Alice Adams at Sunset Boulevard, Stevens realized he had to leave as he was scheduled to begin filming Annie Oakley (1935). RKO had purchased a script by Joseph Fields and Ewart Adamson, which fictionalized the life of Annie Oakley. Barbara Stanwyck was cast in the title role after she had left Warner Bros. The film tells of the namesake sharpshooter who becomes a local celebrity at Buffalo Bill's Wild West Show. When Buffalo Bill's manager, Jeff Hogarth (Melvyn Douglas), showcases fellow sharpshooter Toby Walker (Preston Foster), a rivalry develops between Oakley and Walker, which turns romantic. Annie Oakley opened in November 1935 and was well received by film critics and audiences.

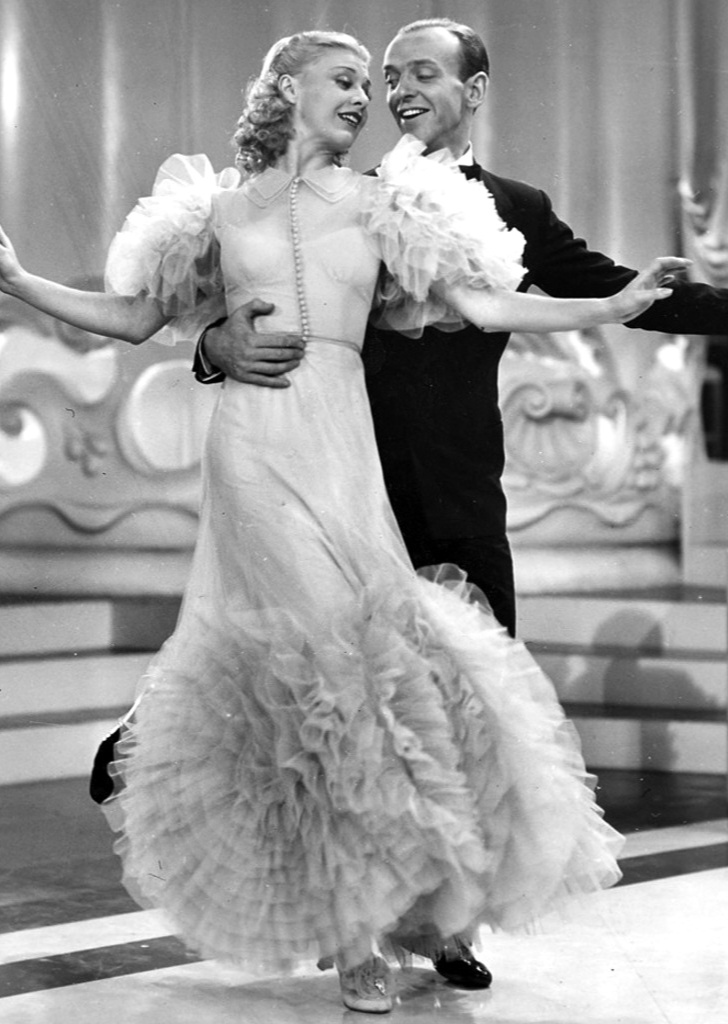
Fred Astaire and Ginger Rogers in Swing Time

The 1936 musical Swing Time was adapted from Erwin Gelsey's original screen story "Portrait of John Garnett". In November 1935, Gelsey was hired to adapt the script while Jerome Kern was to compose the music. Pandro S. Berman handed Stevens an unfinished script titled Never Gonna Dance, which was written specifically for Fred Astaire and Ginger Rogers. Broadway playwright Howard Lindsay wrote another draft of the screenplay, which was then rewritten by Alan Scott and Ernest Pagano. It was Kern who proposed retitling the film to Swing Time.

Astaire plays Lucky Garrett, a dancer and gambler, who arrives in New York with his friend "Pop" Cardetti (Victor Moore) to make $25,000 to prove to his prospective father-in-law, Judge Watson, that he is eligible to marry his daughter, Margaret (Betty Furness). However, Lucky falls in love with his dancing instructor, Penny Carroll (Ginger Rogers), and is torn in a love triangle. During filming, Stevens bonded well with Rogers, so much that she wrote in her memoir: "He had an incredible sensitivity to an actress playing a scene. He looked for nuances and was always delighted when I admired something new. I was unafraid to express these acting variations with Stevens at the helm, and the results were evident."

Swing Time premiered in New York on August 28, 1936, to positive reviews from critics. Abel Green of Variety wrote the film was "smart, modern, and impressive in every respect from its boy-loses-girl background to its tunefulness, dancipation, production quality and general high standards." The film also debuted the song "The Way You Look Tonight", which won the 1936 Academy Award for Best Original Song.

Stevens's next project was Quality Street (1937) with Katharine Hepburn. Adapted from the 1901 play by J. M. Barrie, it was the second film adaptation after a 1927 silent film directed by Sidney Franklin and starring Marion Davies. The film tells of Phoebe Throssel, a nervous young woman living on Quality Street, who expects her lover, Dr. Valentine Brown, to propose marriage, but instead, he is sent away to war. Ten years later, Throssel impersonates her own niece, Livvie, with the chance to regain his affection. Principal photography began on September 25, 1936, and wrapped two months later. By the next year, Stevens was assigned to direct Vivacious Lady, and principal filming began on April 15, 1937, with Ginger Rogers and James Stewart, who had been loaned out from MGM. At the time, the supporting cast included Fay Bainter, Donald Crisp, and Virginia Weidler. However, four days into filming, Stewart became ill and returned to MGM to film Of Human Hearts (1938). RKO suspended the project until Stewart became available again by December 1937.

In the interim, Stevens directed A Damsel in Distress (1937) with Fred Astaire in his first film without Ginger Rogers. Instead, RKO had signed Carole Lombard in the opposite female role. However, Lombard dropped out, feeling she would be unfavorably compared to Rogers. Alice Faye was considered, but Pandro S. Berman selected Joan Fontaine, who had been under contract to RKO. It was later discovered that Fontaine could not dance, but Stevens persuaded Astaire not to recast her with Ruby Keeler. Adapted from the 1919 novel by P. G. Wodehouse, Astaire portrays Jerry, an American composer who travels to London and meets the aristocratic Lady Alyce (Fontaine), who herself in love with another American man whom her family forbids her to see. When Alyce escapes the castle with her butler (Reginald Gardiner), she meets with Jerry and falls in love with him instead. Released in November 1937, A Damsel in Distress flopped at the box office.

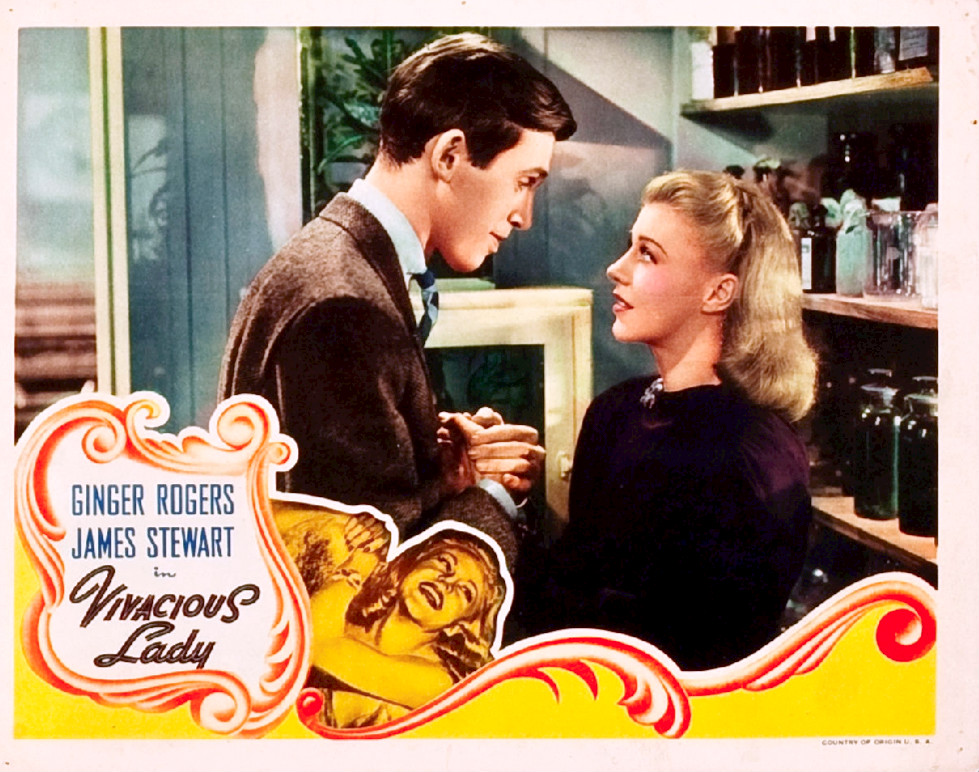
A lobby card for Vivacious Lady with James Stewart and Ginger Rogers

A month later, in December 1937, production on Vivacious Lady resumed with James Stewart and Ginger Rogers returning to their original roles. However, Fay Bainter and Donald Crisp were unavailable to return as they were filming Jezebel (1938) at Warner Bros. Virginia Weidler's role had been rewritten out of the script. They were replaced by Beulah Bondi and Charles Coburn. Stewart plays Peter Morgan, a small-town botany professor, who arrives in New York City and marries Francey Brent, a nightclub singer. He brings her home but is unable to break the news to his college dean father. Filming wrapped on March 5, 1938. Released in May 1938, Edwin Schallert of the Los Angeles Times positively noted the performances of the cast, and wrote the film "is fresh, bright and new and promises to please all who are attached to it."

Meanwhile, RKO had been years in development with a film adaptation of Rudyard Kipling's 1890 poem "Gunga Din". In 1936, Edward Small had acquired the film rights for his independent studio, Reliance Pictures. He then hired William Faulkner to adapt the poem into a suitable screenplay. RKO subsequently acquired the rights, and the project was assigned to Howard Hawks with a screenplay written by Ben Hecht and Charles MacArthur. Production issues, including the script and the casting, prevented further development, and Hawks later directed Bringing Up Baby (1938). By this point, Pandro S. Berman became RKO's production head and hired Anthony Veiller to pare down the script.

During February and March 1938, Berman and Hawks discussed the project, but Berman eventually selected Stevens to direct. Berman explained, "I was afraid he would go over budget so much that I would be in trouble. So I didn't go with Howard. I went with George Stevens who, up to that time, had made pictures reasonably with us." With Stevens at the helm, Cary Grant was cast as Ballantine while Jack Oakie was considered for the part as Cutter. However, Grant convinced Stevens to instead cast him as Cutter, to which Stevens agreed. Victor McLaglen was loaned out to portray MacChesney while Douglas Fairbanks Jr. assumed the role as Ballantine. For the title role as Gunga Din, Sabu had been considered but was unavailable as he was cast in The Thief of Bagdad (1940). Stevens's friend Garson Kanin instead recommended Sam Jaffe.

Location shooting began in July 1938 and continued for the next three-and-a-half months, in which production was finished after 114 days. It had a projected production budget of nearly $2 million, becoming the most expensive film RKO had made. Gunga Din opened in February 1939 and became the highest-grossing film for RKO Pictures, earning $3.8 million.

A month after Gunga Din had premiered, Stevens signed a new contract with RKO Pictures. With the onset of World War II on the European theatre, Stevens found two novels—Kathrine Taylor's Address Unknown and Phyllis Bottome's The Mortal Storm—for his next film. However, RKO president George Schaeffer declined to acquire the screen rights to either novel. In a telegram, Berman explained to Stevens that Schaeffer was "definitely afraid [to] commit ... to any picture that is propaganda anything..." Stevens was furious and issued a letter, stating he had worked tirelessly for RKO, taking only four weeks of vacation time in the past four years. To placate Stevens, Berman offered him to instead adapt A. J. Cronin's then-upcoming novella, Vigil in the Night. Originally a serialization published in Good Housekeeping, Vigil in the Night tells of two sisters, Anne Lee and Lucy (Carole Lombard and Anne Shirley, respectively), who are both nurses in an English hospital. When Lucy's negligence causes a young patient to die, Anne takes the blame to protect her sister and loses her job. The film was a commercial disappointment, losing $327,000 at the box office.

After Vigil Night was released, Stevens departed from RKO and entered contractual discussions with Columbia Pictures. Stevens held precautions about studio president Harry Cohn's reputation for meddling, to which Cohn stipulated he would never interfere with Stevens during production. On May 14, 1940, Stevens signed a three-picture deal with Columbia. Within a week, Stevens purchased the film rights to an adaptation of Louis Bromfield's novel New Orleans with Jean Arthur attached to star. Other speculative projects included Ralston's Ring, a biography of businessman William Chapman Ralston and Hail and Farewell, a magazine story by Williston Rich. By June 1940, under his studio contract, Stevens was attached to direct This Thing Called Love (1940) though he departed the project.

That same month, in June 1940, Stevens acquired the screen rights to Martha Cheavens's story "The Story of a Happy Marriage", which had been published in McCall's magazine. Stevens hired Morrie Ryskind to pen the screenplay while Cheavens was hired as a consultant. Retitled Penny Serenade (1941), the story centers on the courtship and eventual marriage of Roger Adams, a newspaperman, and Julie Gardiner, a music shop sales clerk. Penny Serenade opened in April 1941 to largely positive reviews, with particular praise towards Cary Grant's performance.

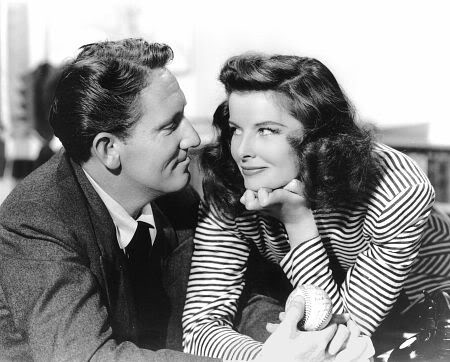
Katharine Hepburn and Spencer Tracy in Woman of the Year

While at Columbia, Stevens had been approached by Katharine Hepburn about directing Woman of the Year (1942). Ring Lardner Jr. and Garson Kanin had written a script in which Tess Harding, a strong-willed political affairs reporter, is pitted against Sam Craig, a sports columnist. Stevens read the unfinished script and agreed to direct, though he insisted the film be produced at Columbia. However, Hepburn had prearranged to have MGM produce the film, as she had intended on Spencer Tracy as her co-star. As a result, Stevens was loaned out to MGM. During test screenings, preview audiences disdained at the original ending, which had Tess accepting her newfound role as a housewife. Stevens, Joseph L. Mankiewicz, and Louis B. Mayer agreed that a new ending was needed, with Tess attempting to make breakfast but failing miserably. Hepburn deplored the new scene, but test audiences responded favorably.

Released in February 1942, Woman of the Year was praised by film critics for the chemistry between the stars. A contemporary article in Time magazine hailed Stevens as "one of the youngest good directors in the business" by which he has "exhibited a versatile talent, a wide range." At the 1943 Academy Awards, Hepburn was nominated for Best Actress, while Michael Kanin and Lardner Jr. won for Best Original Screenplay.

Stevens served as president of the Screen Directors Guild (SDG) from 1941 to 1943.

Stevens returned to Columbia to direct The Talk of the Town (1942). Jean Arthur stars as Nora Shelley, a New England schoolteacher who harbors Leopold Dilg (Cary Grant), an accused arsonist, from justice while sharing a country house with Michael Lightcap, a distinguished Harvard law professor (Ronald Colman) who has been nominated to the U.S. Supreme Court. Principal photography began on January 19, 1942, and ended after four months on April 8. Stevens filmed two endings, one where Nora marries Dilg and another where she marries Lightcap. He allowed test audiences to determine their preferred ending, and most preferred the former.

The Talk of the Town opened at the Radio City Music Hall on August 27, 1942, to critical success. Bosley Crowther of The New York Times felt the film is "[a] lot of fun and excitement result. Irwin Shaw and Sidney Buchman wrote a smart and lively script for the film, and George Stevens has directed it with the slyness of a first-rate comedy man." Harrison's Reports wrote "in addition to the drawing power of the stars, the story is a grand combination of comedy and human interest, the sort that should appeal to all types of audiences." The film was nominated for five Academy Awards, including for Best Picture.

Afterwards, Jean Arthur was placed on suspension after she had rejected offered scripts. In New York, she and her husband Frank Ross reconnected with Garson Kanin and hired him to write a film for her. At the time, Kanin was stationed at Fort Monmouth, New Jersey, and befriended his bunkmate Robert W. Russell. Together, they concocted a script tentatively Two's a Crowd, which impressed Arthur and Ross, who paid Kanin $25,000 for the script. Kanin then presented the script to Harry Cohn, who decided it would be the next film for Arthur and George Stevens.

Retitled The More the Merrier (1943), the romantic comedy starred Jean Arthur, Joel McCrea, and Charles Coburn. Cary Grant was Stevens's first choice to appear opposite Jean Arthur, but he was unavailable and McCrea was hired instead. Stevens held a table reading with the actors, and during filming, he encouraged on-set improvisation and shot extensive coverage for several scenes while filming. Cohn heard of this and complained, "That Stevens exposes more film and shoots more angles than any director I've ever had on the lot." The film involves Connie Milligan, a government worker, who decides to rent half of her four-room apartment to an older gentleman, Benjamin Dingle, due to a housing shortage. Though Connie is engaged, Dingle decides she needs a boyfriend and leases his half to Joe Carter, an army sergeant.

Released in 1943, The More the Merrier was positively received by film critics. The film received six nominations at the Academy Awards, including for Best Picture and Best Director; Coburn won for Best Supporting Actor. Stevens also won for Best Director at the New York Film Critics Awards. By then, Stevens was in North Africa, photographing World War II.

=== 1943–1946: World War II ===
"I quit the film business [...] I wanted to be in the war—I didn't want to make films at that time. I had an opportunity to go overseas right away if I'd go in the Army at a certain time."

— Stevens, in a 1967 interview with Robert Hughes

Stevens had seen the Nazi propaganda film Triumph of the Will (1935) and was provoked to join the Allied forces in World War II. On January 6, 1943, Stevens's draft board explained he would be "sent by the Special Service Division of the War Department on a mission outside the continental limits of the United States for an indefinite period." On February 18, he was sworn in as a Major under the U.S. Army Signal Corps division and departed from Los Angeles.

However, he was hospitalized at Fort Jay near Manhattan for pneumonia and took weeks to recover. On April 13, Stevens arrived in Egypt and stayed until June 15. That same month, he arrived in Algiers to document the Tunisian campaign, but later discovered the German Army had been soundly defeated and was one day from surrender.

On June 30, 1943, Stevens was transferred to Iran (then known as Persia). Within two weeks, he arrived at a military post in Andimeshk, a town near the Iran–Iraq border, where refugee Poles, most of whom were women, had escaped to and were being extradited elsewhere. Stevens left Persia on August 20.

Stevens then flew to New York and stayed there and in Washington, D.C. from September 15 through October 26. He landed in London, where he received orders from U.S. General Dwight D. Eisenhower to recruit forty-five people for the Special Coverage Unit (SPECOU). Stevens's unit included writers Irwin Shaw, William Saroyan, and Ivan Moffat; cameramen William C. Mellor, Jack Muth, Ken Marthey, and Dick Hoar; sound operator Bill Hamilton, and assistant director Hollingsworth Morse. The Special Coverage Unit was placed under the control of the Supreme Headquarters Allied Expeditionary Force (SHAEF). This unit recorded footage—including the only color film of the war in Europe (which remained archived for decades)—as well documented the Normandy landings (D-Day).

By the summer of 1944, Stevens's unit accompanied the 4th Infantry Division as they headed toward Paris. Eisenhower allowed the 2nd Armored Division commanded by General Philippe Leclerc to advance into the city first, followed by the American infantry. Stevens obtained permission for his unit to ride with the French, as they documented the liberation of Paris. In a letter to his wife Yvonne, dated September 1, Stevens wrote:

The morning that we came into Paris was the wildest thing that I have ever seen. The civilians lined the streets and went mad as the Tanks and armored cars came in. They stood in the streets and cheered as the shooting went on all around them.

In November 1944, the Allied Forces advanced into Germany more quickly than anticipated. On December 16, the Germans launched a counteroffensive assault against the Americans known as the Battle of the Bulge. Fatigued, the Americans retreated, of which Stevens observed "the stunned look on the faces" of soldiers in his journal on his fortieth birthday. In January 1945, Stevens was pulled away to London to help supervise the war documentary The True Glory (1945) directed by Garson Kanin and Carol Reed. The film won the 1945 Academy Award for Best Documentary Feature.

On April 25, 1945, the U.S. and the Soviet troops met at the Elbe, footage of which Stevens's unit recorded. Stevens then ventured southwards to Dachau, located outside of Munich. The Allies liberated Dachau on April 29, and Stevens reached the concentration camp two days later. For the remainder of 1945, Stevens remained in Germany to compile concentration camp footage and other audiovisual materials, along with screenwriter Budd Schulberg for The Nazi Plan (1945) to be presented as evidence for the Nuremberg trials. In 2008, Stevens's footage was selected for preservation in the U.S. National Film Registry by the Library of Congress as an "essential visual record" of the war.

Stevens returned to the United States aboard the RMS Queen Mary. Back in Los Angeles, Stevens retired from the U.S. Army in March 1946 with the rank of Lieutenant Colonel.

=== 1946–1950: Transition into serious fare ===
After his military service, Stevens accepted an offer to direct a comedic segment between James Stewart and Henry Fonda featured in On Our Merry Way (1948). The film was produced by Burgess Meredith and Benedict Bogeaus while King Vidor and Leslie Fenton were credited as the directors. John Huston had directed one segment and went uncredited. In Stevens's segment, Stewart and Fonda portray jazz musicians who are members of a traveling jazz band. Their caravan breaks down in the small town of Sycamore, California, where they tried to fix a talent contest so the mayor's son wins. Stevens insisted he be uncredited for his contribution.

In 1944, Frank Capra approached Stevens to join his new independent production company, Liberty Films. Stevens held off on the decision, and while he was in France, he met with Harry Cohn and promised he would rejoin Columbia Pictures when he returned. However, Stevens reneged on his promise and joined Liberty Films. In February 1946, Capra held a press conference announcing Liberty Films, and named Stevens, Samuel Briskin, and William Wyler as his partners. Stevens held a 25 percent ownership of the company's shares. At Liberty Films, Stevens developed a comedy titled One Big Happy Family which was to star Ingrid Bergman. However, he shelved the project as he lacked confidence in the story. Stevens told several friends, "After the war, I don't think I was ever too hilarious again." Capra's It's A Wonderful Life (1946) lost money at the box office, and in January 1947, Capra decided to sell Liberty Films. By May 1947, Paramount Pictures acquired the company, and as part of the buyout, Capra, Stevens and Wyler became contract directors with Paramount.

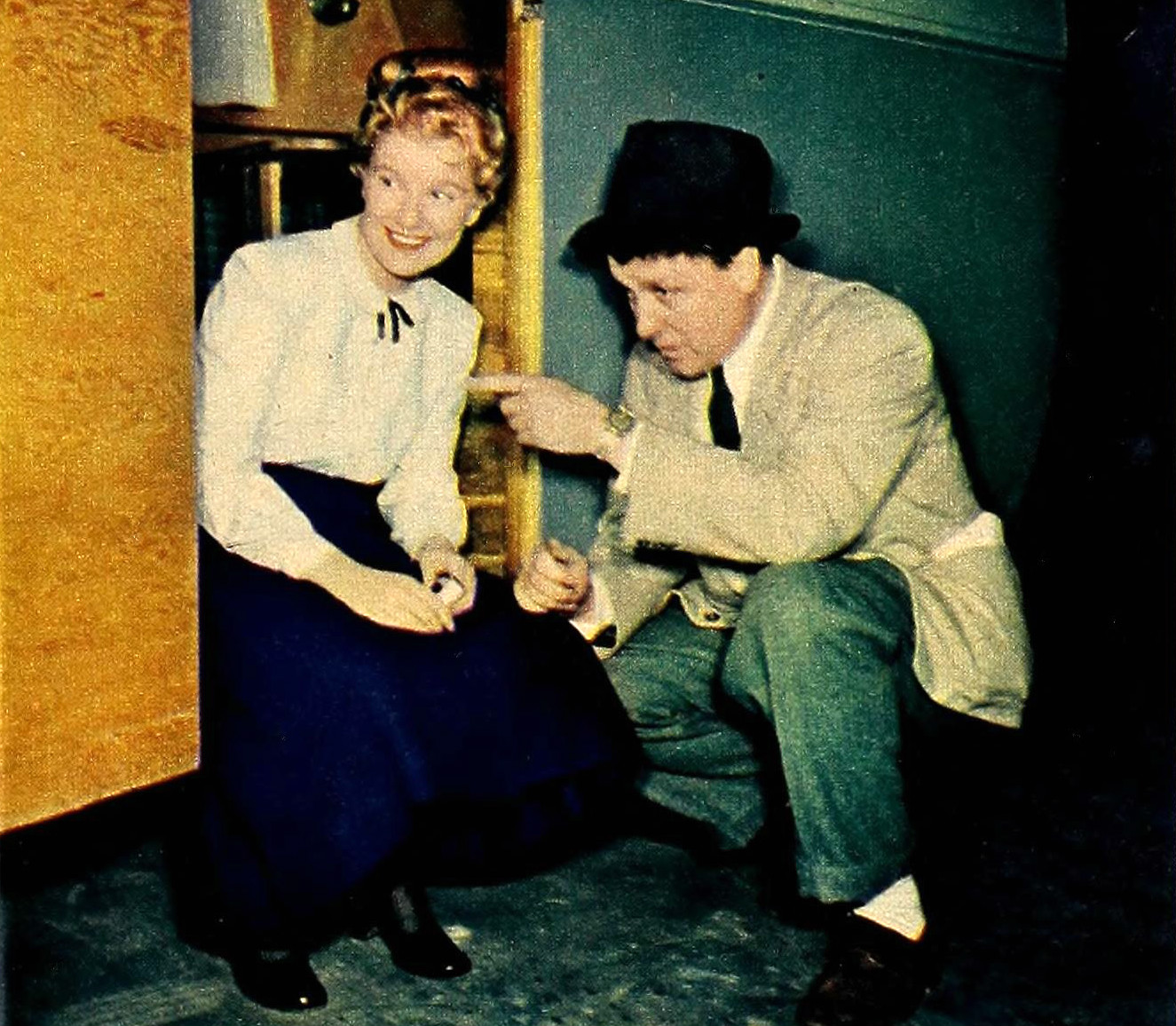
Stevens with Barbara Bel Geddes on set of I Remember Mama (1948)

Beforehand, due to contractual obligations, Stevens had been loaned to RKO to direct I Remember Mama (1948). RKO had purchased the film rights to Kathryn Forbes's 1943 novel Mama's Bank Account. It was then adapted into a 1944 play written by John Van Druten. Harriet Parsons offered the title role to Greta Garbo, but she declined. Irene Dunne was also offered the role, to which she agreed. From a list of five directors, Dunne selected Stevens to direct. Stevens had seen the play, which starred Mady Christians, and connected with the material. In 1974, he stated, "It was set in San Francisco, and I was a kid there during that period. I thought it would be fun to reconstruct the period."

Principal photography began on March 27, 1947, and lasted six months. During production, Stevens worked closely with screenwriter DeWitt Bodeen on revising the shooting script. Bodeen remembered, "It was a long, long production, almost double the budget on several shooting days because George wanted it right..." I Remember Mama opened at the Radio City Music Hall on March 8, 1948, to positive reviews. Herman Schoenfeld of Variety praised the film as "a layer of warm and deeply moving nostalgia that plucks at that special heart-string" while Dunne was praised for "holding down the most demanding role in her career".

=== 1951–1956: The American Trilogy ===
==== A Place in the Sun ====
Stevens had first read Theodore Dreiser's 1925 novel An American Tragedy during its first year of publication. He reread the novel in 1945 and approached Paramount Pictures, which had produced a 1931 filmed version, about a new adaptation. Barney Balaban, president of Paramount, declined, believing an adaptation would not be popular with audiences, and due to Dreiser's alleged Communist affiliation. Paramount also found potential copyright infringement with Patrick Kearney's play adaptation of Dreiser's novel. Frustrated, Stevens filed a lawsuit accusing Paramount of violating his studio contract. In 1949, Paramount relented, and Stevens advanced the project into development, in which he hired Michael Wilson to write the script. Wilson submitted a first draft by April 1949, and Harry Brown was hired for rewrites.

Inspired by a 1906 murder trial, the film tells of an unmarried pregnant woman who is murdered by her boyfriend after he falls in love with a wealthy socialite—albeit with the characters renamed. Montgomery Clift, Elizabeth Taylor, and Shelley Winters were cast in the lead roles, and filming began on October 4, 1949, on the Paramount backlot and then moved to Lake Tahoe, Nevada. As customary, Stevens meticulously filmed multiple takes with the actors stretching over several hours. Winters explained in her memoir, "Stevens would print the first take, then spend the next three hours minutely rehearsing the scene, then film it again." After several title suggestions, Ivan Moffat selected the title A Place in the Sun, which had been based on a phrase used by German Foreign Secretary Bernhard von Bülow.

After nineteen months in post-production, A Place in the Sun premiered at the Fine Arts Theatre in Los Angeles and received nationwide critical acclaim. A. H. Weiler of The New York Times applauded the performances of the cast and believed the film was "a work of beauty, tenderness, power and insight." Variety also applauded: "Stevens has obviously given tremendous thought to every nuance of his own direction to get credibility, movement and all the touches that contribute to making a good film a fine art form." By January 1952, A Place in the Sun had earned $3.5 million in box office rentals in the United States and Canada. The film won six Academy Awards, including Stevens who was awarded the Best Director Oscar.

While editing A Place in the Sun, Stevens accepted an offer to direct Something to Live For (1952). The script had been written by Dwight Taylor, which was partially based on his actress mother Laurette Taylor and her struggle with alcoholism. Joan Fontaine portrays her onscreen equivalent, Jenny Carey, who finds an intimate connection with Alan Miller (Ray Milland), a former alcoholic who is a married man with two children and a pregnant wife. Shooting began in May 1950, but the film was shelved after a preview in August 1951. The film was released in March 1952 to poor critical and audience reception.

==== Shane ====
"As time went on, however, I kept feeling I should do a picture about the war—all the other guys had done or were doing pictures about their war experiences, [John] Ford, [John] Huston, Wyler, and so on. And here I was avoiding the subject. Until I found Shane—it was a Western, but it was really my war picture. The cattlemen against the ranchers, the gunfighter, the wide-eyed little boy, it was pretty clear to me what it was about."

— Stevens, 1974

During the fall of 1949, Paramount had purchased the film rights to the Western novel Shane by Jack Schaefer. Henry Ginsberg, Paramount's head of production, then sent a memo to Stevens, asking if he was interested in directing Shane as a possible Alan Ladd vehicle. Stevens's son George Jr. has claimed he read the novel at age 17, and successfully convinced his father by telling him what "a really good story" it was.

Montgomery Clift was Stevens's first choice for the title character, while William Holden was intended for Joe Starrett. However, both actors dropped out, thus Stevens picked Alan Ladd after looking at a list of Paramount's contract players. Van Heflin was cast as Joe Starrett, and Jean Arthur portrayed Starrett's wife Marion. The role of their son, Joey, was given to child actor Brandon deWilde, whose perspective the film draws from.

Shane (1953) follows the title gunfighter as he protects a family of homesteaders against antagonistic cattle ranchers. To ensure historical authenticity, Stevens hired Joe De Yong as a consultant. Because De Yong was deaf and mute, he illustrated scenic etchings and improved the colloquialism. Principal photography began in July 1951 near Jackson Hole, Wyoming, and ended on October 19 after filming the interior scenes on a soundstage. Stevens spent fifteen months editing the film. Alarmed that Stevens had gone over budget, Paramount considered selling the film to RKO Pictures, but the deal fell through.

Shane premiered at the Radio City Music Hall on April 23, 1953. For the premiere, Paramount projected the film, which had been shot in the Academy ratio (1.37:1), in a widescreen 1.66:1 aspect ratio. By January 1954, the film had earned $8 million in box office rentals in the United States and Canada. At the 1954 Academy Awards, the film earned five nominations including for Best Picture, but lost to Fred Zinneman's From Here to Eternity (1953). Loyal Griggs won for Best Cinematography – Color.

==== Giant ====
In February 1952, as he was editing Shane, Stevens formed an independent production company, Giant Productions. Despite disagreements over A Place in the Sun (1951), he selected Henry Ginsberg as his creative partner. Meanwhile, Edna Ferber's novel Giant had been first serialized in Ladies' Home Journal before Doubleday published it in the fall of 1952. In December 1952, they made Ferber an offer to acquire the film rights. Spurred by the success of Shane, negotiations between Stevens and Warner Bros. were completed on July 29, 1953. By November 1953, Giant Productions acquired the film rights. In December, the contract was finalized, in which it had been stipulated that Warner Bros. would produce and distribute the film. Stevens, Ferber, and Ginsberg, however, would take no upfront salary but would share 50 percent of the profits after the studio had recouped its production and distribution costs.

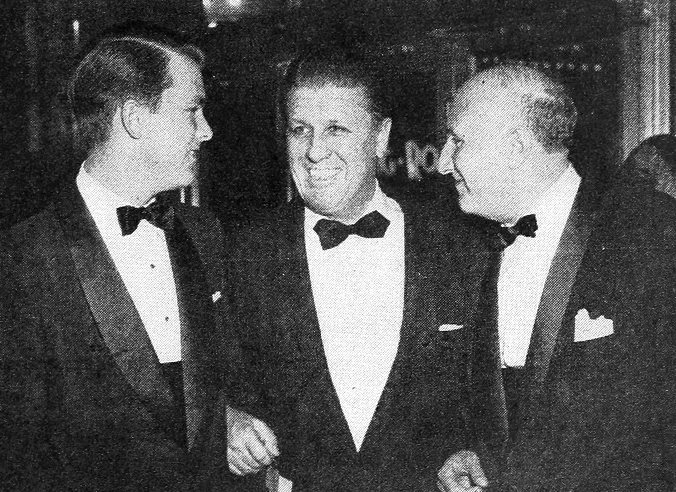
Left to right: George Stevens Jr., his father, George Stevens, and composer Dimitri Tiomkin at the premiere of Giant, October 11, 1956

Stevens hired Ivan Moffat and Fred Guiol to write preliminary treatments, and eventually, a 350-page first draft screenplay was written. According to Stevens, he presented the draft to Ferber in New York. While she complimented the draft, Ferber insisted on the script's fidelity to her novel. On June 20, 1954, Ferber flew out to Los Angeles and volunteered to write unsalaried on the script adaptation. After eleven weeks, she submitted her draft on August 8, which Stevens regarded as more of a treatment bereft of visuals. Stevens and the screenwriters resumed their own collaboration and pared the script down to 240 pages.

An extensive casting search for the three main leads—Jordan "Bick" Benedict, Leslie Lynnton Benedict, and Jett Rink—eventually settled on Rock Hudson, Elizabeth Taylor, and James Dean. Interior filming began in May 1955 on the Warner Bros. studio backlot. The production next moved to Keswick, Virginia for the exterior scenes set in Maryland. On June 4, they relocated to Marfa, Texas for the duration of the production. In addition with Stevens's preference for extensive coverage, the initial 72-day filming shoot fell behind schedule due to Taylor's illness bouts and Dean's frequent tardiness to the set. On September 30, Dean was killed in a car crash near Cholame, California on Route 41. Dean had completed his scenes, though his dialogue tracks were considered inaudible. Stevens hired Nick Adams to reloop Dean's lines. By mid-October 1955, principal photography was finished.

Giant premiered at the Roxy Theatre in New York on October 10, 1956. It earned $12 million in box office rentals. James Powers of The Hollywood Reporter called the film "a monumental drama as big and inspiring as the locale for which it is named, Texas. Giant in size, giant in ambition, giant in the human emotions that are generated by the massive forces of nature and human development that make up the peculiarly American sub-nation, Texas, this picture readily takes its place with the handful of screen epics." At the Academy Awards, the film received ten nominations, though it lost Best Picture to Around the World in 80 Days (1956). Stevens nevertheless won his second Best Director Oscar. He was also the recipient of the year's Screen Directors Guild Award for Best Feature Film.

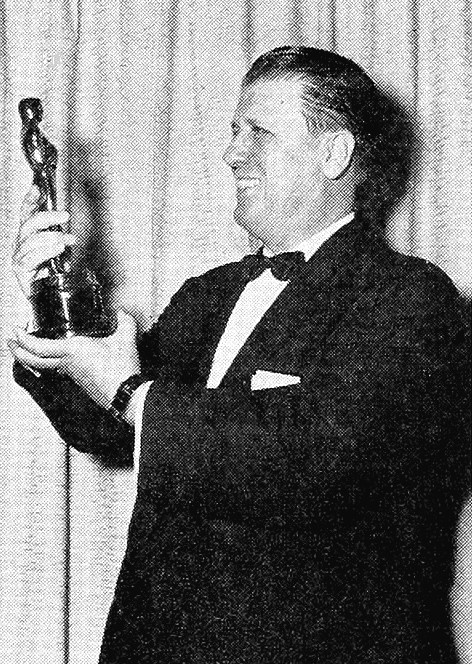
Stevens with his Oscar for directing Giant, 1957

The films—A Place in the Sun, Shane, and Giant—have retrospectively been described as Stevens's American Trilogy. Biographer Neil Sinyard described the films as "deeply American stories, infused with a unique sense of landscape and character that make up the personality of the country [...] At the core of each one is an outsider striving for assimilation and the promise that the country offers and whose aspirations become tantalizing close to fulfilment, but whose ultimate dream of success and happiness will elude his grasp."

=== 1957–1970: Later films ===
==== The Diary of Anne Frank ====
In 1954, Stevens learned that Twentieth Century-Fox had held the film rights to The Diary of Anne Frank. By February 1957, it had been reported that Stevens signed a two-picture contract with the studio. Frances Goodrich and Albert Hackett, who had written the 1955 play, were hired to write the script adaptation. During pre-production, in September 1957, Stevens flew to Amsterdam for research and location scouting, where he visited the attic inside the historical site. He also hired Tony van Renterghem as a technical advisor. Stevens reflected, "Whenever we hit a stumbling block in translating from the stage to the film, not only did I return to the original diary for help, but I also returned to the concentration camp areas and roamed the house in Amsterdam in the quarter where Anne lived, where I talked with countless people who had survived the Nazi period there."

A worldwide casting search for the title role was conducted, with Stevens auditioning more than 100,000 applicants. Audrey Hepburn had been offered the part but she declined. Millie Perkins, a nineteen-year-old model from Fair Lawn, New Jersey, was cast in her screen debut. Joseph Schildkraut, Gusti Huber, and Lou Jacobi reprised their stage roles for the film. Shelley Winters campaigned for the role of Petronella van Daan. A replica of the factory was built on the Twentieth Century-Fox studio backlot, where filming occurred from March to August 1958.

Released in March 1959, The Diary of Anne Frank received largely positive reviews from film critics. Time magazine called the film a "masterpiece", praising Stevens and the screenwriters for depicting "the courage and dignity that man can summon from within himself when the only logical course seems to be to lie down and die." However, the film was a commercial disappointment, earning $2.3 million in estimated box office rentals from the United States and Canada. It won three Academy Awards in 1960, including Best Supporting Actress for Shelley Winters.

==== The Greatest Story Ever Told ====
In 1958, while filming The Diary of Anne Frank, Stevens became aware that Fox held the screen rights to Fulton Oursler's 1949 novel The Greatest Story Ever Told. Oursler had novelized a half-hour radio series by Henry Denker, which told of the life of Jesus from the four canonical Gospels of the New Testament. Stevens founded an independent company, named after the novel, to film the novel. Stevens affirmed his vision for the film would be stripped of pageantry and spectacle, opposite of Cecil B. DeMille's Biblical epics. In 1960, Stevens collaborated with Ivan Moffat and James Lee Barrett on the script, and then hired Carl Sandburg to revise the script. For the next two years, Fox continually delayed the film's release date until 1963. However, in September 1961, Spyros Skouras, president of Fox, announced the studio had "indefinitely postponed" the project due to concerns about the project's commercial prospects. As a result, Stevens moved the project to United Artists.

Meanwhile, Stevens, George Jr., and researcher Tony van Renterghem embarked on a research trip to the Middle East to scout potential filming locations. However, Stevens decided to film near Page, Arizona and around the Glen Canyon upwards to Utah. Stevens explained to The New York Times in 1965: "Unfortunately some of the landscapes around Jerusalem were exciting, but many had been worn down through the years by erosion and man, invaders and wars, to places of less spectacular aspects." Max von Sydow, the first actor cast in the film, was selected as Jesus, while the hiring of an ensemble cast was borne from conversations Stevens held with Skouras.

Principal photography began in late October 1962, but months into production, filming was paused by a severe blizzard near the Colorado River. Refusing to delay shooting until the spring, Stevens grabbed a shovel and ordered the cast and crew to do the same to clear the snow off the sets. Concerned that production had fallen behind schedule, Stevens allowed David Lean and Jean Negulesco to shoot interior scenes representing Jerusalem at the Desilu Culver Studios. On August 1, 1963, the production had wrapped. Seventeen months were spent on editing and post-production, and the film's total production budget skyrocketed to $20 million (equivalent to $210,326,087 in 2025), becoming the most expensive film shot in the United States at the time.

The Greatest Story Ever Told was released in February 1965 in select Cinerama theaters, with the film's runtime reduced to 141 minutes for the general release. Columnist Hedda Hopper called the film "a magnificent spectacle photographed gloriously. No one could have played Christ as well as Max Von Sydow. You believe. But it was an hour too long." On the other hand, Shana Alexander, reviewing for Life magazine, criticized the film's glacial pacing, the "cameo" appearances, and cited a "lack of risk, lack of daring, lack of invention, [and] even lack of inspiration" on Stevens's part.

Later that same year, Stevens filed a $2 million lawsuit against NBC and Paramount, charging them with "mutilation and dismemberment" when they had aired A Place in the Sun with television commercials. Stevens had made a contractual provision with Liberty Films (and then upheld with Paramount), which allowed him to control the film's editing. In February 1966, William Wyler voiced his support for Stevens at a Directors Guild of America (DGA) dinner gala. That same month, a federal judge sided with Stevens, barring NBC from televising the film. However, the Los Angeles County Superior Court reversed the ruling and upheld the defendants, in which it was held the commercials did not "substantially damage" the film.

==== The Only Game in Town ====
During that same time, Warren Beatty had conversed with Stevens about directing Bonnie and Clyde (1967). Beatty remembered, "And we would have long silent meetings in Chinese restaurants, And he would think, silently [...] And I could never get him to do the movie, but I sure had a lot of meetings with him." In 1968, Stevens read Frank Gilroy's script for The Only Game in Town, which he adapted from his own play. Frank Sinatra was intended to star opposite Elizabeth Taylor, but Sinatra pulled out. Stevens then asked Beatty to assume the role, which Beatty immediately agreed to without reading the script. Principal photography began in Paris on September 30, 1968, and lasted until February 1969. They relocated to Las Vegas for a week before wrapping the shoot on the Fox studio backlot on March 3.

In the film, Taylor stars as Fran Walker, a middle-aged chorus girl who is in the midst of a divorce. She falls in love with Joe Grady (Warren Beatty), a frustrated musician and compulsive gambler who dreams of escaping Las Vegas for success in New York City. The Only Game in Town opened on January 23, 1970, to favorable reviews. Charles Champlin of the Los Angeles Times wrote the film was "an endearing old-fashioned romance, even if its premise could hardly be more up-to-date and permissive. (And at that, the permissiveness is granted verbally. It's all tell, no show, and I'm glad.)"

In 1970, Stevens was appointed as the president of the jury at the 20th Berlin International Film Festival. A screening of the film o.k., directed by Michael Verhoeven, was cancelled when the jury voted 7–2 to remove the film from competition. Stevens cited a FIAPF guideline stating, "All film festivals should contribute to better understanding between nations." He further criticized the film's gang rape scene. Based on the 1966 Incident on Hill 192 during the Vietnam War, the film depicts a young Vietnamese girl who is kidnapped, raped, stabbed and shot to death by four American soldiers. A fifth American soldier takes no part in the assault, and his official report goes ignored in the files. Verhoeven denied the film was anti-American, stating in an interview with the German newspaper Hamburger Abendblatt: "If I were an American, I would even say my film is pro‐American. The biggest part of the American people today is against the war in Vietnam."

Yugoslav filmmaker Dušan Makavejev, a member of the jury, accused Stevens of censorship and overstepping his authority. After many press conferences and numerous declarations of protest, the jury announced its resignation, thereby halting the continuation of the festival. Berlinale director Alfred Bauer and the umbrella organization Berliner Festspiele GmbH, Walther Schmiederer, tendered their resignations, though Bauer returned. On July 5, 1970, the competition was cancelled and no major prizes were awarded. In 1973, Stevens was a member of the jury at the 8th Moscow International Film Festival.

== Personal life and death ==
In 1928, he met Yvonne Howell in Oliver Hardy's home; they were married on January 1, 1930. Stevens was the father of television and film writer-producer-director George Stevens, Jr., the founder of the American Film Institute (AFI). George Jr. produced and directed the documentary about his father George Stevens: A Filmmaker's Journey in 1984 and is the father of Stevens's grandson Michael Stevens (1966–2015), who was also a television and film producer-director.

On March 8, 1975, Stevens died of a heart attack on his ranch in Lancaster, California, north of Los Angeles, at the age of 70. He is interred at Forest Lawn Memorial Park in the Hollywood Hills of Los Angeles.

== Filmography ==
=== Short films ===
Year	Title	Notes
1930	Below Zero	Short film
1932	Who, Me?	Short film
1932	The Finishing Touch	Short film
1932	Boys Will Be Boys	Short film
1933	Family Troubles	Short film
1933	Rock-a-Bye Cowboy	Short film
1933	Should Crooners Marry	Short film
1933	Room Mates	Short film
1933	Quiet Please!	Short film
1933	What Fur	Short film
1933	Walking Back Home	Short film
1933	Grin and Bear It	Short film
1933	A Divorce Courtship	Short film
1934	Strictly Fresh Yeggs	Short film
1934	Cracked Shots	Short film

=== Feature films ===
Year	Title	Notes
1930	Ladies Last	3rd episode from The Boy Friends film serial
1931	Blood and Thunder	4th episode from The Boy Friends film serial
1931	High Gear	5th episode from The Boy Friends film serial
1931	Air-Tight	7th episode from The Boy Friends film serial
1931	Call a Cop!	8th episode from The Boy Friends film serial
1931	Mama Loves Papa	9th episode from The Boy Friends film serial
1931	The Kick-Off!	10th episode from The Boy Friends film serial
1933	The Cohens and Kellys in Trouble	Part of "The Cohens and Kellys" comedy film serial
1933	Flirting in the Park	Part of "The Blonde and The Redhead" comedy film serial
1934	Bridal Bail	Part of "The Blonde and The Redhead" comedy film serial
1934	The Undie-World	Part of "The Blonde and The Redhead" comedy film serial
1934	Rough Necking	Part of "The Blonde and The Redhead" comedy film serial
1934	Ocean Swells	Part of "The Blonde and The Redhead" comedy film serial
1935	Hunger Pains	Part of "The Blonde and The Redhead" comedy film serial
1934	Bachelor Bait	
1934	Kentucky Kernels	
1934	Hollywood Party	Was among 8 directors supervising sequences for the film
1935	Laddie	
1935	The Nitwits	
1935	Alice Adams	
1935	Annie Oakley	
1936	Swing Time	
1937	Quality Street	
1937	A Damsel in Distress	
1938	Vivacious Lady	
1939	Gunga Din	
1940	Vigil in the Night	
1941	Penny Serenade	
1942	Woman of the Year	
1942	The Talk of the Town	
1943	The More the Merrier	
1945	That Justice Be Done	Documentary / Short film
1945	Nazi Concentration Camps	
1948	On Our Merry Way	Anthology film / Co-directed a sequence
1948	I Remember Mama	
1951	A Place in the Sun	
1952	Something to Live For	
1953	Shane	Technicolor film
1956	Giant	Warnercolor film
1959	The Diary of Anne Frank	
1965	The Greatest Story Ever Told	Ultra Panavision 70 Technicolor film
1970	The Only Game in Town	Color film

== Archives ==
The moving image collection of George Stevens is held at the Academy Film Archive. The film material at AFI is complemented by material in the George Stevens papers at the academy's Margaret Herrick Library.

== Awards and honors ==
Academy Awards

Year	Award	Film	Result	Winner	Ref.
1943	Best Director	The More the Merrier	Nominated	Michael Curtiz – Casablanca	
1951	Best Picture	A Place in the Sun	Nominated	Arthur Freed – An American in Paris	
1951	Best Director	A Place in the Sun	Won	—N/a	
1953	Best Picture	Shane	Nominated	Buddy Adler – From Here to Eternity	
1953	Best Director	Shane	Nominated	Fred Zinnemann – From Here to Eternity	
1953	Irving G. Thalberg Memorial Award		Received	—N/a	
1956	Best Motion Picture	Giant	Nominated	Mike Todd – Around the World in 80 Days	
1956	Best Director	Giant	Won	—N/a	
1959	Best Motion Picture	The Diary of Anne Frank	Nominated	Sam Zimbalist – Ben-Hur (Posthumous)	
1959	Best Director	The Diary of Anne Frank	Nominated	William Wyler – Ben-Hur	

As a lieutenant colonel in the U.S. Army, Stevens headed the Signal Corps unit that filmed D-Day and the liberation of the Dachau concentration camp. For these contributions, he was awarded the Legion of Merit.

Stevens has a star on the Hollywood Walk of Fame at 1701 Vine Street. He won the Academy Award for Best Director twice, in 1951 for A Place in the Sun and in 1956 for Giant. He was also nominated in 1943 for The More the Merrier, in 1954 for Shane, and in 1959 for The Diary of Anne Frank.

He also received both the Irving G. Thalberg Memorial Award and the Lifetime Achievement Award from the Academy of Motion Picture Arts and Sciences (1954). He also received the National Board of Review Award for Best Director and the New York Film Critics Circle Award for Best Director.

== Sources and notes ==
=== Works cited ===
- Cronin, Paul (2004). George Stevens: Interviews. Jackson, MS: University Press of Mississippi. ISBN 1-57806-639-5.
- Eliot, Marc (2004). Cary Grant: A Biography. New York: Crown Publishing Group. ISBN 978-0-307-20983-2.
- Gilbert, Julie (2024). Giant Love: Edna Ferber, Her Best-Selling Novel of Texas, and the Making of a Classic American Film. New York: Pantheon. ISBN 978-1-524-74843-2.
- Harris, Mark (2008). Pictures at a Revolution: Five Movies and the Birth of the New Hollywood. Penguin Press. ISBN 978-1-594-20152-3.
- Harris, Mark (2014). Five Came Back: A Story of Hollywood and the Second World War. Penguin Press. ISBN 978-1-782-11288-4.
- Higham, Charles (1975). Kate: The Life of Katharine Hepburn. New York: W. W. Norton. ISBN 978-0-393-32598-0.
- Leaming, Barbara (1995). Katharine Hepburn. New York: Crown Publishers. ISBN 978-0-517-59284-7.
- McCarthy, Todd (1997). Howard Hawks: The Grey Fox of Hollywood. New York: Grove Press. ISBN 978-0-8021-3740-1.
- Moss, Marilyn Ann (2004). Giant: George Stevens, a Life on Film. Madison: University of Wisconsin Press. ISBN 0-299-20430-8.
- Okuda, Ted; Neibaur, James L. (2012). Stan Without Ollie: The Stan Laurel Solo Films, 1917–1927. Jefferson, North Carolina: McFarland & Company. ISBN 978-0-786-44781-7.
- Oller, John (1997). Jean Arthur: The Actress Nobody Knew. Limelight. ISBN 978-0-879-10278-4.
- Petri, Bruce (1987). A Theory of American Film: The Films and Techniques of George Stevens. New York: Taylor & Francis. ISBN 0-8240-0070-6.
- Richie, Donald (1984) [1970]. George Stevens: An American Romantic. New York: Taylor & Francis. ISBN 0-8240-5773-2.
- Rogers, Ginger (1991). Ginger: My Story. New York: HarperCollins. ISBN 978-0-060-18308-0.
- Sinyard, Neil (2019). George Stevens: The Films Of a Hollywood Giant. McFarland & Company, Inc. ISBN 978-1-476-63660-3.
- Stevens, Jr., George (2022). My Place in the Sun: Life in the Golden Age of Hollywood and Washington. University Press of Kentucky. ISBN 978-0-813-19541-4.
- Thomas, Bob (1984). Astaire, the Man, the Dancer. New York: St. Martin's Press. ISBN 0-297-78402-1.
- Thomas, Bob (1990). King Cohn: The Life and Times of Hollywood Mogul Harry Cohn. McGraw-Hill. ISBN 978-0-070-64261-4.
- Winters, Shelley (1980). Shelley: Also Known as Shirley. New York: William Morrow and Company. ISBN 978-0-688-03638-6.

Non-profit organization positions
Preceded by George Seaton	President of Academy of Motion Pictures, Arts and Sciences; 1958–1959	Succeeded by B. B. Kahane
