= Once in Paris... =

1978 film by Frank D. Gilroy

- Theatrical release poster
- Directed by: Frank D. Gilroy
- Written by: Frank D. Gilroy
- Produced by: Gérard Croce; Manny Fuchs; Frank D. Gilroy
- Starring: Wayne Rogers; Gayle Hunnicutt
- Cinematography: Claude Saunier
- Edited by: Robert Q. Lovett
- Music by: Mitch Leigh
- Production company: Leigh-McLaughlin
- Distributed by: Atlantic Releasing Corporation
- Release date: November 9, 1978 (New York City)
- Running time: 100 minutes
- Country: United States
- Language: English

Once in Paris... is a 1978 American drama film written and directed by Frank D. Gilroy and is inspired by his experiences in Paris during the filming of the 1970 film adaptation of his play The Only Game in Town.

== Plot ==
An American screenwriter encounters love while working on rewrites of a script being filmed in Paris.

== Cast ==
- Wayne Rogers as Michael Moore
- Gayle Hunnicutt as Susan Townsend
- Jack Lenoir as Jean-Paul Barbet
- Philippe March as Marchel Théry
- Clément Harari as Abe Wiley
- Tanya Lopert as Eve Carling
- Marthe Mercadier as Jean-Paul's Wife
- Yves Massard as 1st Man at Party
- Sady Rebbot as 2nd Man at Party
- Matt Carney as Lars Brady
- Doris Roberts as Brady's Ex-Wife
- Max Fournel as 1st Waiter
- Gérard Croce as Monsieur Farny
- Victoria Ville as Madame Farny
- Franck Peyrinaud as Young Man at Party
- Jean-Jacques Charriere as Brady's Friend
- Sylvaine Charlet as Woman in Restaurant
- Pierre Dupray as Man in Restaurant
- Patrick Aubrée as Desk Clerk
- Stéphane Delcher as Bell Boy
- Jean Jacques Rousselet as 2nd Waiter
- Jacques Bouanich as 1st Chauffeur
- Henri Attal as 2nd Chauffeur
- Béatrice Chatelier as Girl in Car
- Marta Andras as Party Guest
- Chouky Sargent as Party Guest
- Manny Fuchs as Party Guest
- André Fetet as Freddie
- Marie-Caroline Carliez as Jean-Paul's Daughter
- Edgar Croce as Jean-Paul's Son
- Nicole Teboul as Jean-Paul's Daughter
- Michael Teboul as Jean-Paul's Son

== Production ==
The story is inspired by Gilroy's experiences working in Paris on the film adaptation of his stage play The Only Game in Town starring Elizabeth Taylor, who insisted that it be shot in Paris, France despite being set in Las Vegas. This is alluded to when the chauffeur looks at the screenwriter's small hotel room and remarks, "Elizabeth Taylor's closet was bigger than this."

Like The Only Game in Town, Once in Paris... was shot in Paris, albeit with a French crew (whereas The Only Game in Town used an American crew).

Jack Lenoir, who plays the chauffeur in Once in Paris..., was actually Gilroy's chauffeur during the filming of The Only Game in Town.

== Reception ==
Reviewer Kevin Thomas of the Los Angeles Times wrote, "This is a very New York film, with its emphasis on characterization rather than style, with its cast composed of actors rather than movie stars. [...] 'The Luckiest Man in the World' is the kind of film that many people would enjoy; it has more substance than chic, and its sensibility and perspective are comfortably middle-aged."

A reviewer for The New York Times wrote, "Though its hero, a high-powered screenwriter, travels by Concorde, Frank D. Gilroy's 'Once in Paris' appears to be a tale out of the comparatively naïve, propeller-driven 1950's rather than the more jaded, jet-propelled 1970's, the period when it's all supposed to take place. [...] The film means to be a romantic lark, but this lark seldom becomes airborne."

A reviewer for Variety wrote, "Writer-director Frank Gilroy has come up with a highly personalized tale of a rough around-the-edges Yank screenwriter’s relationship with a worldly chauffeur and a bauteous British aristocrat. Gilroy’s developed the triad in subtle, believable, intelligent and often humorous fashion making Once in Paris a super film."

Reviewer John Skow of Time wrote, "Uncloudable sunniness of mood is what is required to sit through this decorative but unsubstantial comedy without snarling. [...] But lines are what Gilroy has not provided, and the film's failure to be better than mediocre is the clear result of his slovenliness."

Reviewer Gary Arnold of The Washington Post wrote, "Written and directed by Frand D. Gilroy, 'Once in Paris' seems to be onto something fresh and entertaining, but Gilroy isn't quite the film-maker to nurture it into a satisfying experience. [...] You warm to the humor inherent in this situation, but Gilroy gets little comic mileage out of it."

A reviewer for misacor.org.au wrote, "Once In Paris describes itself as a bittersweet romance. It has been done so many times before but, of course. the love story will always be with us. Paris locations enhance this one, plus a sympathetic performance from Wayne Rodgers as a married American screenwriter infatuated by glacial beauty Gayle Hunnicut. The film highlights the bitter and inevitable futility of a sweet passing affair - by the ironic device of the hero's doctoring a romantic screenplay. But the film is transformed entirely by the unexpected and totally engaging performance by Jack Lenoir as a Parisian conman chauffeur. He certainly makes the film - publicity says Lenoir was writer-director Frank D. Gilroy's chauffeur once in Paris ..."

In a review of the film for the series Sneak Previews, Gene Siskel said, "One of my biggest complaints about movies in general is that we rarely are given characters that seem as real or as bright or as entertaining as even Roger. But good news, Once in Paris... is an American-made film that gives us three bright, lively, and real characters." Roger Ebert responded, "I never believed the relationship between these two people. The only person in the movie I did buy, did like, did appreciate was the chauffeur, Jack Lenoir. I thought that he was a very good character. Well-acted."

== Accolades ==
Gilroy's screenplay was nominated for the Writers Guild of America Award for Best Original Comedy but did not win.
