= Vigil in the Night =

1940 film by George Stevens

- theatrical poster
- Directed by: George Stevens
- Written by: Fred Guiol; P. J. Wolfson; Rowland Leigh
- Based on: Vigil in the Night; 1941 novel by A. J. Cronin
- Produced by: George Stevens
- Starring: Carole Lombard; Brian Aherne; Anne Shirley
- Cinematography: Robert De Grasse
- Edited by: Henry Berman
- Music by: Alfred Newman
- Production company: RKO Radio Pictures, Inc.
- Distributed by: RKO Radio Pictures, Inc.
- Release date: February 9, 1940
- Running time: 96 minutes 102 minutes (US)
- Country: United States
- Language: English
- Budget: $920,000
- Box office: $1,004,000

Vigil in the Night is a 1940 RKO Pictures drama film based on the 1939 serialized novel Vigil in the Night by A. J. Cronin. The film was produced and directed by George Stevens and stars Carole Lombard, Brian Aherne and Anne Shirley.

== Plot ==
In Great Britain, nurse Anne Lee takes the blame for a fatal error made by her sister Lucy—also a nurse, but at Anne's insistence—and is forced to leave the hospital where they both work. She moves to Hepperton, where she procures a job at another hospital, which is chronically underfunded and understaffed due to the tightfisted attitude of its chairman of the board, wealthy businessman Matthew Bowley.

While in the gallery observing surgery on Bowley by Robert Prescott, a highly respected doctor at the hospital, she notices that Prescott left a swab inside the patient, and mentions it. She is reprimanded by her supervisor, Matron East, for her unprofessional behaviour, but Prescott checks and discovers she is right. Later, Anne and Matron East are in a bus accident; Dr. Prescott is the nearest physician, and he is impressed by her conduct. They become further acquainted. Meanwhile Anne is promoted.

However, Bowley becomes attracted to her and offers her a position as his personal nurse, incurring the jealousy of his wife, who threatens to cause a public scandal if Anne is not dismissed. Matron East has no choice, but at least allows Anne to resign instead.

Anne goes to London, where her now-married sister has abandoned her husband, Joe Shand, after he ran out of money and works as a nurse at a fashionable rest home. When a famous actress commits suicide under her care, she and the proprietress of the facility are threatened with the charge of negligent homicide. Dr. Prescott does some investigating and learns that the rest home's owner and the doctor who prescribed narcotics for the actress have a shady history together. Lucy is cleared of wrongdoing.

Then a deadly epidemic breaks out in Hepperton, and the resources and staff of the hospital are stretched to the breaking point. Anne and Lucy rush there to provide much-needed assistance, while Prescott goes to Bowley to obtain funds to fight the outbreak. Bowley refuses to raise any money, and Prescott is unable to do so on his own. Anne, on her own initiative, authorises purchases to prepare a new isolation ward and has the bills sent to Bowley. Bowley is outraged, but abruptly changes his tune when his wife informs him that their young son has caught the disease. Lucy takes it upon herself to tend to Matthew Bowley II through the night, and at one point, has to resuscitate him; the boy recovers but Lucy catches the disease. Before she dies, she tells Anne that she informed their former hospital that she was responsible for the fatality. A grateful Bowley develops plans for hospital improvements that exceed Prescott's hopes.

== Cast ==
- Carole Lombard as Anne Lee
- Brian Aherne as Dr. Robert Prescott
- Anne Shirley as Lucy Lee
- Julien Mitchell as Matthew Bowley
- Robert Coote as Dr. Caley
- Brenda Forbes as Nora Dunn
- Rita Page as Glennie
- Peter Cushing as Joe Shand
- Ethel Griffies as Matron East
- Doris Lloyd as Mrs. Martha Bowley
- Emily Fitzroy as Sister Gilson
- Donnie Dunagan as Tommy (uncredited)

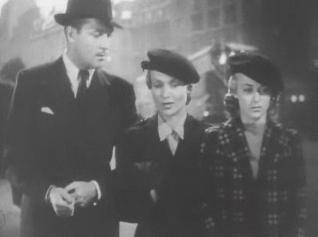
Left to right: Aherne, Lombard and Shirley in a trailer for the film

== Alternative versions ==
The European release of the film has a slightly different ending: British Prime Minister Neville Chamberlain's voice is heard on the radio in Dr. Prescott's office explaining that Hitler has refused to withdraw his troops from Poland and that a state of war exists with Germany. As the United States had not yet entered World War II, the American release does not contain the radio message, and a shot of Anne Lee and Dr. Prescott reacting to the news was deleted.

== Reception ==
Glenn Erickson wrote in his column, DVD Savant, that "Vigil in the Night is beautifully directed, nicely acted and extremely well intentioned, but it has serious problems of credibility due to story and thematic aspects that seemed out of date even in 1940."

== Home media ==
The movie has been released on DVD as part of the Warner Archive Collection.

== See also ==
- List of American films of 1940
