= Tom Mason (actor, born 1949) =

American actor (born 1949)

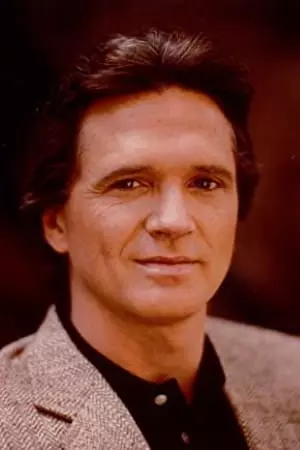
- Occupation: Actor
- Years active: 1977–present

Tom Mason is an American actor.

He began his television career in 1977, portraying Rex Stout's fictional detective Archie Goodwin in the ABC-TV movie Nero Wolfe. His subsequent TV credits include the series Grandpa Goes to Washington, Freebie and the Bean (1980), George Washington (1984), Our Family Honor (1985–1986), Jack and Mike (1986–1987), Party of Five (1994–2000), The Bedford Diaries (2006) and The Black Donnellys (2007). Mason's episodic credits include Law & Order, The Practice, 100 Centre Street and The Sopranos.

Mason's film credits include Apocalypse Now (1979), The Aliens Are Coming (1980), Return of the Man from U.N.C.L.E. (1983), Crimes of the Heart (1986), Men Don't Leave (1990), F/X2 (1991), Jonathan: The Boy Nobody Wanted (1992), The Amy Fisher Story (1993), Final Appeal (1993), Greedy (1994), Flashfire (1994), The Puppet Masters (1994), Brooklyn Lobster (2005) and Flags of Our Fathers (2006).

In the HBO television movie, Too Big to Fail (2011), Mason portrayed AIG chairman and CEO Bob Willumstad.
