= Blake Lindsley =

American actress (born 1973)

- Born: Norma Blake Lindsley Schlei; December 19, 1973; Los Angeles, California, United States
- Education: Yale University
- Occupation: Actress
- Years active: 1994–present
- Spouse: Stephen Nemeth (2010–present)
- Website: blakelindsley.com

Blake Lindsley (born Norma Blake Lindsley Schlei; December 19, 1973) is an American actress.

== Life and career ==
She was born Norma Blake Lindsley Schlei in Los Angeles, California. She graduated from Harvard-Westlake High School in 1992 and then graduated from Yale University.

Lindsley has appeared in over fifteen films and over eighteen television productions. She has also participated in the production of a video game.

Lindsley married Stephen Nemeth on May 30, 2010.

== Filmography ==
Her film appearances include:

- The Wall of Mexico (2019)
- Hollywood Seagull (2013)
- The Sessions (2012)
- The Killer Inside Me (2010)
- Betrayal (2009)
- Intelligent Life: Change Your Mind, Change Your World (documentary), Narrator (2009)
- Kink (short) (2008)
- Stage Kiss (2006)
- Briar Patch (2003)
- Coastlines (2002)
- Mulholland Dr. (2001)
- Time of Her Time (2000)
- The Big Brass Ring (1999)
- Ground Control (1998)
- I Woke Up Early The Day I Died (1998)
- Starship Troopers (1997)
- Casualties (1997)
- Dogtown (1996)
- The Glimmer Man (1996)
- Swingers (1996)
- Getting In (1994)

=== Television and video-game work ===
Lindsley's television appearances include:

- Leverage (2010)
- Criminal Minds (2008)
- Without A Trace (2008)
- Backwoods (2008)
- Sacrifices of the Heart (2007)
- Wicked Wicked Games (2006)
- Fashion House (2006)
- CSI: Crime Scene Investigation (2000–2006)
- Murder 101 (2006, TV movie)
- Meet the Santas (2005, TV movie)
- Cold Case (2004)
- Crossing Jordan (2004)
- Back When We Were Grownups (2004, TV movie)
- Frasier (2004)
- Mister Sterling (2003)
- NYPD Blue (2002)
- Philly (2002)
- An American Daughter (2000, TV movie)
- Star Trek: Deep Space Nine (1998)
- JAG (1998)

== Video-game work ==
- Star Trek: Klingon Academy, (2000, Live Action and Voice)
