= Emmet G. Lavery Jr. =

American lawyer

Emmet Godfrey Lavery Jr. (August 10, 1927 – February 16, 2014) was an American television and film producer, attorney, and the son of the librettist, playwright, and screenwriter Emmet Lavery.

== Early years and law career ==
Born in Poughkeepsie, New York, Lavery attended Williston Northampton School, served in the United States Army from 1945 until 1946, and graduated from UCLA in 1950. He earned his law degree from UCLA Law School in 1953 and was admitted to the California State Bar Association in 1954. He specialized in entertainment law, partnering with a law firm from 1954 to 1960, then operated his own office until 1963.

== Career as producer ==
In 1965, Lavery became director of business affairs for 20th Century Fox Television. Two years later, he became Paramount Television's vice president of business affairs.

Lavery formed Emmet G. Lavery Jr. Productions in 1975 and produced several television films, including Delancey Street: The Crisis Within (1975), Nero Wolfe (1977), The Ghost of Flight 401 (1978) and Act of Violence (1979). His company also produced the Serpico television series.

Lavery joined DLT Entertainment as vice president of business affairs in 1981, remaining in that position until retiring in 2010.

== Death ==
Lavery died of natural causes in Encino, California, on February 16, 2014. He was 86. He was survived by two children.
