= Gibbsville (TV series) =

- Genre: Drama
- Starring: John Savage; Gig Young; Biff McGuire; Peggy McCay; Bert Remsen
- Theme music composer: Leonard Rosenman
- Country of origin: United States
- Original language: English
- No. of seasons: 1
- No. of episodes: 13 (7 unaired) (+ film pilot)

Production
- Executive producer: David Gerber
- Running time: 60 minutes
- Production companies: David Gerber Productions; Columbia Pictures Television

Original release
- Network: NBC
- Release: November 11 – December 30, 1976

Gibbsville is a 1976 American drama television series starring John Savage and Gig Young. The plot centers on the activities of two reporters for a newspaper in a small Pennsylvania town in the 1940s. It aired from November 11 to December 30, 1976, on NBC.

== Cast ==
- John Savage as Jim Malloy
- Gig Young as Ray Whitehead
- Biff McGuire as Dr. Mike Malloy
- Peggy McCay as Mrs. Malloy
- Bert Remsen as Mr. Pell

== Synopsis ==
In the 1940s, Jim Malloy returns to his hometown, the fictional small mining town of Gibbsville, Pennsylvania, after being expelled from Yale University during his sophomore year. He becomes a young cub reporter for the town's newspaper, the Gibbsville Courier. He works there with a senior reporter, Ray Whitehead, who had begun his career in journalism with the Courier and left Gibbsville to pursue a promising career with more prestigious newspapers in larger cities. However, alcoholism had made Ray's career falter, and he had returned to Gibbsville and the Courier to try to make a fresh start. Mr. Pell is the editor of the Courier and is Jim's and Ray's boss.

Jim lives in Gibbsville with his parents, Dr. Mike Malloy and Mrs. Malloy. Dr. Malloy is the town's physician.

== Production ==
The stories and characters in the show were based on the writings of John O'Hara about the fictional Gibbsville (itself based closely on the real-life town of Pottsville, Pennsylvania), and the opening credits refer to the show as "John O'Hara's Gibbsville", the title of the 1975 television movie.

In addition to the 1975 television movie written and directed by playwright Frank D. Gilroy that served as the show's pilot, thirteen episodes were produced, although only six of them aired.

== Broadcast history ==
A 90-minute television movie, John O'Hara's Gibbsville – later retitled The Turning Point of Jim Malloy and alternatively titled Gibbsville: The Turning Point of Jim Malloy – aired on NBC on April 12, 1975. Based on the John O'Hara semi-autobiographical story anthology The Doctor's Son, it served as the pilot for Gibbsville. Several delays followed in getting the weekly series on the air. Gibbsville was finally planned to premiere at the beginning of NBC's fall 1976 season, but it encountered one last delay when it was displaced at the last minute. After the cancellation of the series Gemini Man, NBC reshuffled its Thursday evening lineup and added Gibbsville to the schedule in mid-November 1976.

Gibbsville finally premiered as a weekly series on November 11, 1976 – 17 months after its pilot aired – and NBC broadcast it at 10:00 p.m. on Thursdays throughout its brief run. Its sixth episode was broadcast on December 30, 1976, after which NBC cancelled it. The remaining seven episodes never aired.

== Episodes ==
=== Television film (1975) ===
Title	Directed by	Written by	Original release date
The Turning Point of Jim Malloy	Frank D. Gilroy	Frank D. Gilroy	April 12, 1975
Jim Malloy returns to his home town of Gibbsville, Pennsylvania, after being expelled from Yale University during his sophomore year and begins a new career on the town's newspaper, the Gibbsville Courier. Originally broadcast as the television movie John O′Hara′s Gibbsville and also alternatively titled Gibbsville: The Turning Point of Jim Malloy, this was the only 90-minute episode of Gibbsville.

=== Season 1 (1976) ===
No.	Title	Directed by	Written by	Original release date
1	"How Old, How Young"	Harry Harris	Liam O'Brien	November 11, 1976
Gibbsville city officials thwart efforts to get to the bottom of a mysterious explosion. Guest stars: Walter Pidgeon, Jane Wyatt, Jack Aranson, Kenneth Tobey, Frank Campanella, Roy Jenson, and Arnold Soboloff
2	"Saturday Night"	Harry Harris	Jerry Ludwig	November 18, 1976
An armed robber terrorizes local merchants, a middle-aged couple are purged of the guilt with which they lived for six years, and at the local dance Jim enjoys the company of a high-school acquaintance who has blossomed into a stunning beauty, all on the same Saturday night in Gibbsville.
3	"Trapped"	Alf Kjellin	Richard Fielder	December 9, 1976
The people of Gibbsville await word on miners trapped in an explosion while a radio personality milks the disaster for pathos and Jim and Ray try to dig up evidence of negligence.
4	"All the Young Girls"	Unknown	Michael Mann	December 16, 1976
A policeman who supplements his income illegally gives some help to his wartime buddy, a has-been boxer.
5	"Andrea"	Marc Daniels	Edward Adler	December 23, 1976
Ray rekindles a romance with a woman (Joan Collins) who is now engaged to a judge presiding over a mine-safety hearing.
6	"Afternoon Waltz"	Alexander Singer	Larry Brody	December 30, 1976
Jim's former classmate at Yale University struggles to adjust to a secret personal problem.
7	"Chautauqua, Chautauqua, Chautauqua"	Don McDougall	Anthony Lawrence	Unaired
8	"In the Silence"	TBD	TBD	UNAIRED
9	"Manhood"	Marc Daniels	John T. Dugan	UNAIRED
10	"A Case History"	TBD	TBD	UNAIRED
11	"The Price of Everything"	N/A	Jerry Ludwig	Unaired
12	"All I've Tried to Be"	N/A	N/A	Unaired
13	"The Grand Gesture"	N/A	N/A	Unaired
