= Nero Wolfe (film) =

- Title screen
- Genre: Drama; Mystery
- Based on: The Doorbell Rang by Rex Stout
- Written by: Frank D. Gilroy
- Directed by: Frank D. Gilroy
- Starring: Thayer David; Tom Mason; Brooke Adams; Biff McGuire; John Randolph; Anne Baxter
- Music by: Leonard Rosenman
- Country of origin: United States
- Original language: English

Production
- Executive producer: Emmet G. Lavery Jr.
- Producer: Everett Chambers
- Cinematography: Ric Waite
- Editor: Harry Keller
- Running time: 120 minutes
- Production companies: Emmet C. Lavery Jr. Productions; Paramount Television
- Budget: $1.5 million

Original release
- Network: ABC
- Release: December 19, 1979

Nero Wolfe is a 1979 American made-for-television film adaptation of the 1965 Nero Wolfe novel The Doorbell Rang by Rex Stout. Thayer David stars as Wolfe, gourmet, connoisseur and detective genius. Tom Mason costars as Archie Goodwin, Wolfe's assistant. Written and directed by Frank D. Gilroy, the film was produced by Paramount Television as a pilot for an ABC television series, but it was shelved by the network for more than two years before finally being broadcast December 19, 1979.

== Cast ==
Thayer David (Nero Wolfe) and Tom Mason (Archie Goodwin).

- Thayer David as Nero Wolfe
- Tom Mason as Archie Goodwin
- Brooke Adams as Sarah Dacos
- Biff McGuire as Inspector Cramer
- John Randolph as Lon Cohen
- Anne Baxter as Mrs. Rachel Bruner
- David Hurst as Fritz
- John O'Leary as Theodore Horstmann
- Sarah Cunningham as Mrs. Althaus
- Lewis Charles as Saul Panzer
- Frank Campanella as Fred Durkin
- John Gerstad as Dr. Vollmer
- John Hoyt as Hewitt
- Ivor Francis as Evers
- Allen Case as Rugby
- Rod Browning as 2nd FBI Man
- Katharine Charles as Marian Hinckley
- Joe George as O'Dell
- Richard Ford Grayling as 1st FBI Man
- David Lewis as Mr. Althaus
- Robert Phalen as Yarmack
- Sam Weisman as Quayle

== Production ==
Disappointed with the Columbia Pictures films based on his first two Nero Wolfe novels, mystery writer Rex Stout was leery of further Hollywood adaptations in his lifetime. "I've had offers," Stout told author Dick Lochte in 1967, "but I haven't been to a movie in 30 years and I despise television. ... Anyway, the money, in addition to what the books are bringing in, would put me in a tax bracket where I wouldn't see much of it. If the characters are any good for films or television they'll be just as good 10 years from now." Ten years later, a little more than a year after Stout's death, literary agent H.N. Swanson negotiated an agreement for a Nero Wolfe television movie.

In 1976 Paramount Television purchased the rights for the entire set of Nero Wolfe stories for Orson Welles. Paramount paid $200,000 for the TV rights to eight hours of Nero Wolfe. The producers planned to begin with an ABC-TV movie and hoped to persuade Welles to continue the role in a mini-series. Frank D. Gilroy was signed to write the television script ("The Doorbell Rang") and direct the TV movie on the assurance that Welles would star, but by April 1977 Welles had bowed out.

"I was told to discover someone for the role since no other name actors were acceptable to them (ABC/Paramount) or to me," Gilroy wrote in his memoir, I Wake Up Screening (1993). "After a bicoastal search, which acquainted me with just about every corpulent middle-aged actor available, I, close to giving up, encountered Thayer David. No sooner did he start to read than Emmet Lavery, the producer, and I exchanged a look: We'd found our man."

At a cost of about $1.5 million, Nero Wolfe was filmed in March, April and May 1977, in locales including Van Nuys and Malibu, California, and New York City. The scene in which Mrs. Rachel Bruner (Anne Baxter) goes ice skating was filmed at Rockefeller Center.

In June 1977, UPI reported that the two-hour film would air during the 1977–78 season, with the possibility of it becoming a weekly series in January 1978. But the film had still not aired when Thayer David died in July 1978. In a November 1979 interview, Gilroy mildly complained to the Associated Press that Nero Wolfe had still not been broadcast by ABC, and praised the performance of David. "It doesn't affect my career one way or the other that they haven't shown it, but that was the most important thing he ever did on film, and I'm determined to get it aired," Gilroy said.

Nero Wolfe was finally broadcast by ABC-TV at midnight December 18, 1979. Asked why the movie had not been run before, a former ABC executive familiar with the movie's development said, "It wasn't very good. It was very slow and plodding and talky. We just felt it wouldn't get any numbers." Asked why it had finally been scheduled, a network staffer speculated, "It's called 'dusting off the shelf.'"

Frank Gilroy was recognized with an Edgar Award nomination by the Mystery Writers of America in 1980.

In January 1981, Paramount Television's one-hour weekly series Nero Wolfe, starring William Conrad, began a 14-episode run on NBC.

== Reception ==
James Bawden of the Toronto Star wrote, "This adaptation of Rex Stout's The Doorbell Rang is way above average."

Paula Vitaris of Scarlet Street wrote, "Not surprisingly, this version played fast and loose with the original story, even implying a romantic relationship between the notoriously woman-shy Wolfe and wealthy widow Rachel Bruner (Anne Baxter), at whose behest Wolfe had taken on one of his most formidable foes, the FBI."

== Home media ==
Cover of the Visual Entertainment, Inc., DVD release of Rex Stout's Nero Wolfe: The Complete Series (2017)

In 2003, AudioVision Canada released Nero Wolfe on DVD in a described edition for the blind and those with diminished vision.ISBN 0-7789-8107-X

On May 3, 2017, VEI announced a DVD release for the 1981 TV series starring William Conrad. Reported to be "coming soon", Rex Stout's Nero Wolfe: The Complete Series will include the 1977 pilot starring Thayer David.
