= Biff McGuire =

American actor (1926–2021)

- McGuire in Grandpa Goes to Washington, 1978
- Born: William Joseph McGuire Jr. October 25, 1926; New Haven, Connecticut, U.S.
- Died: March 9, 2021 (aged 94)
- Education: University of Massachusetts
- Occupations: Film and television actor
- Years active: 1950–2013
- Spouse: Jeannie Carson (m. 1960)
- Children: 2

William Joseph McGuire Jr.; (October 25, 1926 – March 9, 2021), known as Biff McGuire, was an American actor, best known as Inspector Kramer in Nero Wolfe (1979).

== Early years ==
McGuire attended Hamden High School and the University of Massachusetts, where he studied agricultural engineering.

He acquired his nickname from playing football.

McGuire left the university to join the U.S. Army. While stationed in England, he studied at Shrivenham University; while there he painted sets for and acted in a local theater's production. That experience led to a role in a play in London.

== Career ==
In a career that spanned 50 years, McGuire collected a number of theatrical credits. He debuted on Broadway in Bright Boy (1944).

On October 9, 1955, McGuire starred in the episode "Number Seven, Hangman's Row" of the CBS anthology series, Appointment with Adventure. He also starred in the Alfred Hitchcock Presents episodes "The Gentleman From America" (1956), "The Hidden Thing" (1956), "Crackpot" (1957), and "Don't Interrupt" (1958, as Larry Templeton). He appeared in such television series as The Secret Storm and All My Children. He was a regular on Herb Shriner Time (1951–1952) on ABC and portrayed Dr. Michael Malloy in the NBC drama Gibbsville (1976).

== Personal life and death ==
McGuire married English actress and singer Jeannie Carson in 1960. She starred in the CBS situation comedy Hey, Jeannie! (1956–1957). Carson co-starred with McGuire in Finian's Rainbow.

Biff McGuire died on March 9, 2021, at the age of 94.

== Recognition ==
McGuire was nominated for two Tony Awards:

- 1997 Actor (Featured Role—Play) for The Young Man From Atlanta
- 2002 Actor (Featured Role—Play) for Morning's at Seven

== Filmography ==
- You're in the Navy Now (1951) as Sailor Messenger (uncredited)
- The Phenix City Story (1955) as Fred Gage
- Alfred Hitchcock Presents (1956) (Season 1 Episode 31: "Gentleman from America") as Howard Latimer
- Alfred Hitchcock Presents (1956) (Season 1 Episode 34: "The Hidden Thing") as Dana Edwards
- Alfred Hitchcock Presents (1957) (Season 2 Episode 15: "Crackpot") as Ray Loomis
- Alfred Hitchcock Presents (1958) (Season 4 Episode 2: "Don't Interrupt") as Larry Templeton
- Station Six-Sahara (1963) as Jimmy
- The Thomas Crown Affair (1968) as Sandy
- The Heart is a Lonely Hunter (1968) as Mr. Kelly
- Paradise Lost (1971) as Phil Foley
- The Werewolf of Washington (1973) as President
- Serpico (1973) as Captain McClain
- Gunsmoke (1974) as Potter season 20 episode 8 (the fourth victim)
- John O'Hara's Gibbsville (a.k.a. The Turning Point of Jim Malloy) (TV movie, 1975) as Dr. Michael Malloy
- Hawaii Five-O (1975 episode: "See How She Runs") as Babe Mandell
- Midway (1976) as Captain Miles Browning
- Gibbsville (TV series, 6 episodes, 1976) as Dr. Michael Malloy
- In the Matter of Karen Ann Quinlan (1977) as Father Tom
- Child of Glass (1978) as Joe Armsworth
- The Paper Chase (1979) as Smathers
- The Last Word (1979) as Governor Davis
- Nero Wolfe (1979) as Inspector Cramer
- JAG (2000) as Admiral Caleb Stanton
- Frasier (2001) as Mr. Smolenski
- Hollywood Seagull (2013) as Bruce Sorensen

== Theatre ==
- Finian's Rainbow (1960 revival) – Broadway (Woody)
- Camelot (1963) – national tour (King Arthur)
- The Day Emily Married (2005) – Off-Broadway
- Young Man From Atlanta (1997) – Broadway
- Morning's at Seven (2002) – Broadway
