= Thayer David =

American actor (1927–1978)

- David in Petrocelli, 1976
- Born: David Thayer Hersey; March 4, 1927; Medford, Massachusetts, U.S.
- Died: July 17, 1978 (aged 51); New York City, U.S.
- Occupation: Actor
- Years active: 1950–1978
- Spouse: Valerie French (m. 1970; div. 1975)

David Thayer Hersey (March 4, 1927 – July 17, 1978), known professionally as Thayer David, was an American actor. He was best known to television audiences for his roles on the gothic soap opera Dark Shadows (1966–71). His notable film roles included Count Saknussemm in the film Journey to the Center of the Earth (1959), Reverend Silas Pendrake in Little Big Man (1970), Charlie Robbins in Save the Tiger (1973), Dragon in The Eiger Sanction (1975), fight promoter Miles Jergens in Rocky (1976), and private detective Nero Wolfe in the 1979 ABC television film. He also appeared in numerous Broadway plays, and his raspy, distinctive voice lent itself to voice-over work in commercials and instructional films.

== Early life ==
Thayer David was born March 4, 1927, in Medford, Massachusetts. His father, Thayer Frye Hersey, was an executive in the paper pulp industry. David attended Harvard University in the 1940s but did not graduate, concentrating instead upon a career on the stage. With financial support from his father, he co-founded the Brattle Theater Company (1948–1952) in Cambridge, Massachusetts, and established himself in the professional theatre.

== Career ==
=== Stage ===
He went on to act in The Relapse 1950 (Sir Tunbelly Clumsey); The Taming of the Shrew 1951 (Grumio); The Way of the World 1954 (Petulant); The Carefree Tree 1955 (The Sixth Son); King Lear 1956 (Duke of Cornwall); Mister Johnson 1956 (Gollup); Saint Joan 1956 (The Inquisitor); Protective Custody 1956 (Dr. Steidl); Oscar Wilde 1957 (Oscar Wilde); The Golden Six 1958 (Tiberius); A Man for All Seasons 1961 (Cardinal Wolsey); La Belle 1962; Andorra 1963 (pub keeper); The Seagull 1964 (Sorin); The Crucible 1964 (Danforth); Baker Street 1965 (Moriarty); The Royal Hunt of the Sun 1965 (Miguel Estete); Ring Round the Moon 1966 (Messerchann); Those That Play the Clowns 1966 (Henning); Breakfast at Tiffany's 1966 (Rusty Trawler); The Sorrows of Frederick 1967; The Bench 1968 (Phillipi); Uncle Vanya 1971 (Serebryakov); The Jockey Club Stakes 1973 (Sir Dymock Blackburn); and The Dogs of Pavlov 1974.

=== Film and television ===
David played the dark and menacing role of Count Saknussem in the film Journey to the Center of the Earth (1959). From 1966 to 1971, David portrayed various characters on ABC's daytime phenomenon Dark Shadows. His many roles on Dark Shadows included Matthew Morgan, Ben Stokes, Professor T. Elliot Stokes, Sandor Rakosi, Count Andreas Petofi, Timothy Stokes (Parallel Time), Mordecai Grimes, and Ben Stokes (Parallel Time). David played different roles in each of the spinoff movies - House of Dark Shadows (1970, playing Professor T. Elliot Stokes); and Night of Dark Shadows (1971, playing Reverend Strack).

On the big screen, he played Reverend Silas Pendrake in Little Big Man (1970). He also played the professional arsonist Charlie Robbins in Save the Tiger (1973) with Jack Lemmon, the afflicted spymaster Dragon in The Eiger Sanction (1975) with Clint Eastwood, and fight promoter Miles Jergens in Rocky (1976) (reunited with Save the Tiger director John G. Avildsen).

He played numerous characters on different TV series, including The Wild Wild West, The Rockford Files, Columbo, Ellery Queen, Kojak, Petrocelli, Charlie's Angels, and Hawaii Five-O (S9, Ep10).

David appeared in TV movies such as Nikita Khrushchev in Francis Gary Powers: The True Story of the U-2 Spy Incident (1976) and The Amazing Howard Hughes (1977), as well as miniseries such as Roots, The Rhinemann Exchange, and Washington: Behind Closed Doors.

In 1977, David played the title role in Nero Wolfe, Paramount Television's made-for-TV movie based on the Rex Stout novel The Doorbell Rang. David portrayed the corpulent detective Nero Wolfe, who took on clients grudgingly and solved mysteries dazzlingly. Intended to be the pilot for a series, the film was shelved by ABC. It eventually aired December 18, 1979, 17 months after David's death. He also played an important role as the lead antagonist, Mr. Edward Byron, in the made-for-TV film Spider-Man (1977), which served as the pilot for the 1978 TV series The Amazing Spider-Man.

== Personal life ==
A resident of Manhattan, David collected walking sticks, 18th century European landscape paintings, and Victorian furniture. "He was the most widely educated and best-read actor I've ever encountered," said Frank D. Gilroy, who wrote and directed the 1977 TV movie Nero Wolfe.

He was married to and divorced from film and television actress Valerie French.

=== Death ===
David died July 17, 1978, of a heart attack in New York City at the age of 51. He and French had been planning to remarry.

== Filmography ==
Year	Title	Role	Notes
1957	Baby Face Nelson	Connelly	
1958	A Time to Love and a Time to Die	Oscar Binding	
1958	Wolf Larsen	Mugridge	
1959	Journey to the Center of the Earth	Count Saknussemm	
1960	The Story of Ruth	Hedak	
1966	Dark Shadows	Matthew Morgan	
1970	House of Dark Shadows	Professor T. Eliot Stokes	
1970	Little Big Man	Rev. Silas Pendrake	
1971	Night of Dark Shadows	Rev. Strack	
1972	Savages	Otto Nurder, a Capitalist	
1972	The Stoolie	Lattimore	
1973	Save the Tiger	Charlie Robbins	
1973	Happy Mother's Day, Love George	Minister Pollard	
1973	The Werewolf of Washington	Inspector	
1973	Fore Play	General	
1975	The Eiger Sanction	Dragon	
1975	Hearts of the West	Bank Manager	
1975	The Secret Night Caller	Mr. Henry	
1976	Peeper	Frank Prendergast	
1976	Francis Gary Powers: The True Story of the U-2 Spy Incident	Nikita Khrushchev	
1976	The Duchess and the Dirtwater Fox	Josiah Widdicombe (Mormon patriarch)	
1976	Rocky	Miles Jergens	
1977	Fun with Dick and Jane	Deacon	
1977	Sudden Death	Hauser	
1977	Spider-Man	Edward Byron	
1978	House Calls	Phil Pogostin	Final role
1979	Nero Wolfe	Nero Wolfe	
