= Hollywood Seagull =

- Directed by: Michael Guinzburg
- Written by: Michael Guinzburg; Lara Romanoff
- Produced by: Steve Gould; Michael Guinzburg; Lara Romanoff
- Starring: Biff McGuire; Lara Romanoff; Will Poston; Barbara Williams; Jay Laisne
- Cinematography: Don E. FauntLeRoy
- Edited by: Scott Conrad; Michael Kuge; Roger Cooper
- Music by: Evgeny Shchukin; Doug White
- Production company: American Seagull
- Release date: 27 December 2013
- Running time: 89 minutes
- Country: United States
- Language: English

Hollywood Seagull (initially titled American Seagull) is a 2013 American drama film directed by Michael Guinzburg, starring Biff McGuire, Lara Romanoff, Will Poston, Barbara Williams and Jay Laisne. It is an adaptation of the play The Seagull by Anton Chekhov.

== Cast ==
- Biff McGuire as Bruce Sorensen
- Lara Romanoff as Nina Danilov
- Will Poston as Travis Del Mar
- Barbara Williams as Irene Del Mar
- Jay Laisne as Barry Allen Trigger
- Blake Lindsley as Mandy Pruitt
- Stevie D. White as Melvin Fuller
- Time Winters as Frank Pruitt
- Sal Viscuso as Dr. Don Dorn
- Christopher Callen as Pauline Pruitt

== Release ==
The film received a limited theatrical release on 27 December 2013.

== Reception ==
Ernest Hady of The Village Voice wrote that the film is "full of unintentional humor, high-school-theater level acting, and shoddy writing."

Martin Tsai of the Los Angeles Times wrote that Guizberg "retains all the dots without necessarily connecting them", and that "when a director merely goes through the motions, even Chekhov can be reduced to daytime soap."

Dennis Harvey of Variety wrote that "despite retaining the basic narrative architecture of its classic source", the film "too often feels like a trite, sudsy take on privilege, ambition and angst among showbiz players and wannabes — one that seemingly exists mostly to showcase real-life C-listers, aspirants and pals in the tradition of Henry Jaglom’s films."
