= The Only Game in Town (1970 film) =

1970 film by George Stevens

- Theatrical release poster
- Directed by: George Stevens
- Screenplay by: Frank D. Gilroy
- Based on: The Only Game in Town (1968 play) by Frank D. Gilroy
- Produced by: Fred Kohlmar
- Starring: Elizabeth Taylor; Warren Beatty
- Cinematography: Henri Decaë
- Edited by: John Holmes; William Sands; Pat Shade
- Music by: Maurice Jarre
- Distributed by: 20th Century Fox Film Corp.
- Release date: January 21, 1970 (Los Angeles)
- Running time: 113 minutes
- Country: United States
- Language: English
- Budget: $10,235,000
- Box office: $1.5 million (rentals)

The Only Game in Town is a 1970 American romantic comedy-drama film, the last directed by George Stevens. It stars Elizabeth Taylor and Warren Beatty. The screenplay by Frank D. Gilroy is based on his play of the same name which had a brief run on Broadway in 1968.

== Plot ==
Fran Walker is an aging Las Vegas chorus girl. She has given her wealthy San Francisco, California-based married lover Tom Lockwood, whom she has not seen in six months, ultimatum after ultimatum about leaving his wife, but always ends up back in his arms, despite him not having submitted to her ultimatum. Fran continually tells herself that Tom will one day come through, regardless of whether she truly believes it. She wants to remain financially independent, asking and taking nothing from Tom in terms of financial support or lavish material gifts. She only stays in Las Vegas out of inertia.

Joe Grady is a Las Vegas lounge pianist. Unlike Fran, Joe hates Las Vegas, and is trying to amass five thousand dollars, which he requires to set up a professional life as a pianist in New York City. While he outwardly states that he dabbles in gambling, he is an addict, going on the occasional gambling binge which has led to him not being able to save the money he needs to leave Las Vegas.

Fran and Joe meet when she walks into Tony's, the bar where he works, for a late-night dinner. The two end up going home together that evening in their mutual attraction and in Fran's loneliness, and, able to get over their inherent differences in temperament, have what each believes will be a one-night stand. However, they end up having a no-strings relationship, with each helping the other achieve his or her current goals. This situation has the potential to fall apart either if one or the other is unable to fulfill the other's needs - Joe, who is supposed to stop Fran from falling back into Tom's arms if he does not come through, and Fran, who will keep and hide Joe's money so that he does not gamble it away until he reaches the five thousand dollar mark - or if one or the other ends up falling in love with the other.

== Cast ==
- Elizabeth Taylor as Fran Walker
- Warren Beatty as Joe Grady
- Charles Braswell as Thomas Lockwood
- Hank Henry as Tony
- Olga Valéry as Hooker

== Production notes ==
20th Century Fox paid $550,000 for the film rights before the play opened on Broadway, with Frank D. Gilroy to get $150,000 to write the script. The play, starring Tammy Grimes and Barry Nelson, was not a success, running only sixteen performances. The play was profiled in the William Goldman book The Season: A Candid Look at Broadway.

Elizabeth Taylor was paid $1,125,000 to appear in the film. The film was shot on a soundstage at Studios de Boulogne in Paris, at Taylor's demand as her husband Richard Burton was also working on a film, Staircase at Studios de Boulogne, over eighty-six days. There was not enough footage for the film after the shooting in Paris and another ten days were spent shooting film in Nevada. Stevens had previously directed Taylor twice with great success, in A Place in the Sun (1951) and Giant (1956).

Frank Sinatra originally signed to play Joe, but when Taylor became ill and filming was postponed, he had to drop out of the project to fulfill another commitment with Caesar's Palace in Las Vegas. Warren Beatty was paid $750,000 to replace Sinatra.

Screenwriter Gilroy's experience making the film inspired him to write and direct the film Once in Paris... (1978), which involves a character based on Jack Lenoir, his chauffeur during the shooting of The Only Game in Town. Gilroy was so fascinated by Lenoir that he cast the driver as himself.

Director Curtis Hanson did a reworking of this film with his film Lucky You (2007), which dealt with a professional gambler out to break the bank in Las Vegas. The reworking was in the adding of a female singer and the gambler's father entering the World Series of Poker where the story is set. The film starred Eric Bana, Drew Barrymore and Robert Duvall.

== Release ==
The film premiered at the Beverly in Los Angeles on January 21, 1970. It grossed $28,000 in its opening week.

== Reception ==
=== Box office ===
According to Fox records, the film required $19,300,000 in rentals to break even and had made $4,525,000 by December 11, 1970. In September 1970 the studio had lost $7,557,000 on the film. The Only Game in Town was the second-worst financial failure for Fox, behind Cleopatra, also starring Taylor. Stevens did not direct another film.

=== Critical reception ===
The film received mixed reviews. In his review in The New York Times, Vincent Canby stated, "Assigning [Stevens, Beatty, and Taylor] to the film version of Frank D. Gilroy's small, sentimental, Broadway flop is rather like trying to outfit a leaky Central Park rowboat for a celebrity cruise through the Greek islands. The result is a phenomenological disaster . . . Nothing in The Only Game in Town seems quite on the up and up. Everything, including both the humor and the pathos, is bogus."

In an undated review, Time Out London called it "a hoarily old-fashioned romantic comedy ... [with] occasional moments of life injected by Taylor and Beatty."

TV Guide said, in an undated review, "Although some of the dialog sparkles, in general, [the film] is overly talkly and thinly plotted, a programmer dressed up in ermine."

== See also ==
- 1970 in film
- List of American films of 1970
- List of drama films
- List of films set in Las Vegas

== Works cited ==
- Medved, Harry; Medved, Michael (1984). The Hollywood Hall of Shame: The Most Expensive Flops in Movie History. Angus & Robertson. ISBN 0207149291.
