= George C. Jenkins =

American production designer (1908–2007)

- Born: November 19, 1908; Baltimore, Maryland
- Died: April 6, 2007 (aged 98); Santa Monica, California
- Occupation: Production designer
- Years active: 1946–1990

George Clarke Jenkins (November 19, 1908 – April 6, 2007) was an American production designer.

Born in Baltimore, Maryland, he studied architecture at the University of Pennsylvania before leaving to build sets. He did the set design for Early to Bed, and settings and lighting for Rumple in 1957. One Tony nomination was for his set for the 1959 Broadway drama The Miracle Worker. He also designed the sets for the 1968 play The Only Game in Town.

He shared his Academy Award with George Gaines for the 1976 film All the President's Men. He later taught at University of California, Los Angeles. Jenkins died at his home in Santa Monica, California.
