= Freebie and the Bean (TV series) =

American television series

- Print ad
- Based on: Freebie and the Bean
- Starring: Héctor Elizondo; Tom Mason
- Composer: Dominic Frontiere
- No. of episodes: 9 (2 unaired)

Production
- Producers: Norman Jolley; Robert Sherman
- Cinematography: Ric Waite
- Running time: 60 minutes
- Production company: Warner Bros. Television

Original release
- Release: December 6, 1980 – January 17, 1981

Mason and Elizando in a promotional photo for Freebie and the Bean

Freebie and the Bean is an American action comedy television series about two off-beat plainclothes police detectives in San Francisco. Based on the 1974 film of the same name, it starred Tom Mason and Héctor Elizondo in the title roles and was broadcast on CBS on Saturday nights at 9:00 PM in December 1980 and January 1981.

== Cast ==
- Tom Mason as Det. Sgt. Tim "Freebie" Walker
- Héctor Elizondo as Det. Sgt. Dan "Bean" Delgado
- William Daniels as Dist. Atty. Walter W. Cruikshank
- George Loros as Willie
- Jeannetta Arnette
- Kimberly Beck
- Victoria Carroll as Louise
- Jon Cypher as Dwight Rollins
- Shannon Farnon as Dr. Brimmer
- Ben Hammer as Dr. Bronson
- Katherine Justice as Marsha
- Lori Lethin as Alice
- Donald May as Paul Stacey
- Patricia Pivaar as Gwen Brown
- Sharon Spelman as Stella Wickham
- Joseph Wiseman as Dr. Dorf
- Bill Beyers as George Wilson
- John Carter as Vernon Wilson
- Sandra de Bruin as Melodie Parsons
- Charles Dierkop as Wingy Landon
- Frank Farmer as Borchek
- BarBara Luna as Rita Valdez
- Karen Rushmore
- Mykelti Williamson as Lemar Washington
- Mel Stewart as Rodney "Axle" Blake

== Reception ==
The show ran opposite The Love Boat, which overshadowed it in viewer polls. In their book The Complete Directory to Prime Time Network and Cable TV Shows, 1946-Present, authors Tim Brooks and Earle F. Marsh write, "Unfortunately this series was such as mishmash of comedy and drama, slapstick and reality, that it soon sank without a trace. The fact that it was scheduled opposite ABC's The Love Boat-which had no trouble defining what it wanted to be-probably didn't help."

== Episodes ==
No.	Title	Directed by	Written by	Original release date
1	"The Seduction of the Bean"	Lawrence Dobkin	Dick Nelson	December 6, 1980
2	"Health Nuts"	Bruce Kessler	Dick Nelson	December 13, 1980
Freebie and Bean learn that a series of hold-up victims all visit the same wellness spa so they investigate the employees to see if they are tipping off the bandits.
3	"Pilot"	Hy Averback	Jay Folb	December 20, 1980
Freebie and Bean rely on a scorned woman to testify against a loan shark they've been wanting to put away.
4	"Flying Aces"	Michael Preece	Robert W. Lenski	December 27, 1980
5	"Highway Robbery"	Michael Caffey	Bill Taub	January 10, 1981
Freebie and the Bean go undercover as teamsters to stop a truckjacking ring.
6	"Tee-Off for Two"	Arnold Laven	Rick Mittleman	January 17, 1981
7	"Lover, Come Back"	Michael Preece	Donald R. Boyle	PRE-EMPTED BY CBS NEWS SPECIAL "The Ordeal"
8	"A Pair of Pirates"	Lawrence Dobkin	Robert W. Lenski	UNAIRED
9	"Follow the Leader"	Alex March	Dick Nelson	UNAIRED
