= Frank D. Gilroy =

American dramatist and film producer (1925–2015)

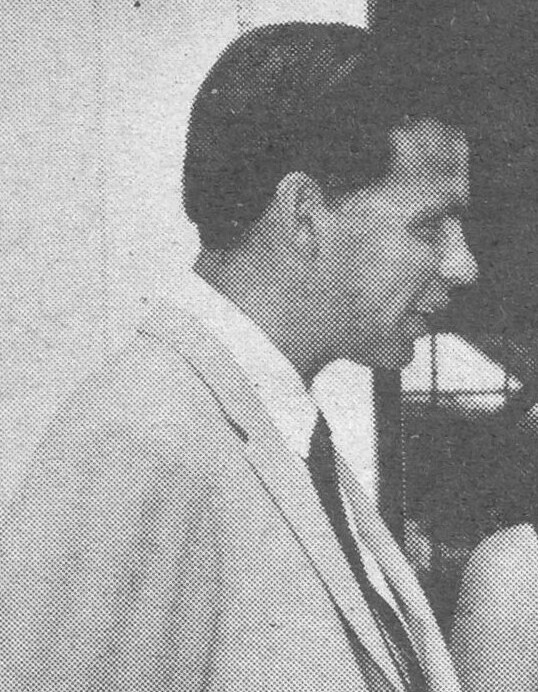
- Gilroy in 1974
- Born: October 13, 1925; New York City, New York, U.S.
- Died: September 12, 2015 (aged 89); Monroe, New York, U.S.
- Education: Dartmouth College (BA); Yale University
- Spouse: Ruth Gaydos (1954–2015)
- Children: Tony; Dan; John
- Writing career
- Pen name: Bert Blessing
- Notable awards: Pulitzer Prize for Drama (1965); Tony Award for Best Play (1965)

Frank Daniel Gilroy (October 13, 1925 – September 12, 2015) was an American playwright, screenwriter, and film producer and director. He received the Tony Award for Best Play and the Pulitzer Prize for Drama for his play The Subject Was Roses in 1965.

== Early life ==
Gilroy was born on October 13, 1925, in New York City, the son of Bettina (née Vasti) and Frank B. Gilroy, a coffee broker. His father was Irish American, and his mother was of Italian and German descent. Gilroy lived in the Bronx for most of his childhood and attended DeWitt Clinton High School. He then enlisted in the U.S. Army after graduation. He served two and a half years in the 89th Infantry Division, of which eighteen months were in the European Theater.

After the war, Gilroy attended Dartmouth College, where he edited The Dartmouth, the campus newspaper, and wrote for Jack-o-Lantern, the college humor magazine. He graduated magna cum laude with a Bachelor of Arts in 1950. In 1966, he received an honorary Doctor of Letters. He also received a grant from Dartmouth that allowed him to attend the Yale School of Drama.

== Writing career ==
Gilroy wrote in the Golden Age of Television for such shows as Playhouse 90, Westinghouse Studio One, The United States Steel Hour, Omnibus, Kraft Television Theatre, and Lux Video Theatre.

His entrance to theatre was marked with his 1962 play Who'll Save the Plowboy? at the off-Broadway Phoenix Theatre, which won the Obie Award. The play follows Albert Cobb, a man who once dreamed of owning a farm, becoming a plowboy. He and his wife Helen are awaiting to be reunited fifteen years after World War II, along with Larry Doyle, the man who saved his life. The title comes from when they were in the war, and Albert was staked as bait by the Germans, and Larry kept shouting "Who'll Save the Plowboy?" until he finally crept out and saved him.

The Subject Was Roses premiered on Broadway on May 25, 1964, and closed on May 21, 1966. The two-act play has been compared to Eugene O'Neill's Long Day's Journey Into Night. Walter Kerr said of the show: "a family triangle in which a father loves a son and the mother loves that son and the son loves both mother and father and not one of them can make a move or utter a sound that does not instantly damage the other."

That Summer, That Fall, which had a brief run on Broadway in 1967, starring Tyne Daly and Irene Papas is a version of the Hippolytus-Phaedra story. The play is set in an Italian neighborhood in Lower Manhattan in an apartment complex.

Gilroy's works include screenplays for the films Desperate Characters (starring Shirley MacLaine) and The Gallant Hours (starring James Cagney). He has also adapted his own plays for film, including The Subject Was Roses (starring Patricia Neal, Martin Sheen and Jack Albertson) and The Only Game in Town (starring Elizabeth Taylor and Warren Beatty). His 1985 screenplay for The Gig (starring Cleavon Little and Wayne Rogers) has been adapted as a musical, with book, music, and lyrics by Douglas J. Cohen. A 2006 Off-Broadway presentation and recording by the York Theatre Company starred Karen Ziemba, Stephen Berger, Michele Pawk, and Michael McCormick.

Gilroy has also written fiction, including the novel From Noon Till Three, which was adapted into a film starring Charles Bronson and Jill Ireland, Bronson's wife and frequent co-star. In addition to writing the screenplay, Gilroy also directed the film. He managed to convince Bronson and Ireland of the merits of rehearsal, which they initially detested. Gilroy later cited the experience as an example of risky casting that can become "a great source of joy."

Gilroy also contributed to several TV westerns in the late 1950s, including Have Gun – Will Travel, The Rifleman, and Wanted: Dead or Alive. He also created the popular TV series Burke's Law. His later credits include Nero Wolfe, a 1977 adaptation of Rex Stout's novel The Doorbell Rang as a television movie with Thayer David.

Gilroy's play Far Rockaway was used as the basis for The Hero, a one-act television opera by Mark Bucci premiered in 1965 on National Educational Television.

Gilroy published two books about his ambivalent efforts to succeed in Hollywood. The first, I Wake Up Screening, chronicles the making of four films he wrote, produced and directed between 1971 and 1989. The second, Writing for Love and/or Money, charts Gilroy's entire writing career but is most notable for its terse yet rambunctious anecdotes about the self-defeatingly incoherent practices of Hollywood producers and executives in the 1950s and 60s. Because the book was written in 2007, Gilroy's distance from the events allows for glib, readable accounts that are perennially applicable for aspiring screenwriters.

One reason Gilroy identified for his friction with movie people was that he treated authenticity as a commodity. "I'm not into conscious style, or symbolism or fancy scrims between you and the material", he asserted. "I come from a theater background, where you lay it all on the table."

== Advocacy ==
A supporter and advocate for writers' rights in theatre, Gilroy was a member of the Dramatists Guild of America. In 1968, he was elected as the fourteenth president of the non-profit organization. He continued his presidency at the Guild until 1971.

== Personal life ==
Gilroy's three sons, from his marriage to sculptor/writer Ruth Dorothy Gaydos, are involved in the film industry. Tony Gilroy and Dan Gilroy are screenwriters and directors, while John Gilroy is a film editor. Frank Gilroy died on September 12, 2015, in Monroe, New York.

== Works ==
=== Plays ===
- The Middle World (1949)
- The Viewing (1957)
- Getting In (1957)
- Who'll Save the Plowboy? (1962)
- The Subject Was Roses (1964)
- Far Rockaway (1965)
- That Summer, That Fall (1967)
- The Only Game in Town (1968)
- Present Tense: Four Plays (1972)

Come Next Tuesday
Twas Brillig
So Please Be Kind
Present Tense

- The Next Contestant (1979)
- Last Licks (1979)
- Dreams of Glory (1980)
- Real to Reel (1987)
- Match Point (1990)
- A Way with Words (1991)

A Way with Words
Match Point
Fore!
Reel to Reel
Give the Bishop My Faint Regards

- Give the Bishop My Faint Regards (1992)
- Fore (1993)
- Any Given Day (1993)
- Getting In (1997)
- Contact With the Enemy
- The Housekeeper
- The Lake
- Piscary
- The Fastest Gun Alive

=== Screenplays ===
- The Fastest Gun Alive (1956), with Russell Rouse
- Texas John Slaughter (1958)
- Gunfight at Sandoval (1959)
- The Gallant Hours, with Beirne Lay, Jr. (1960)
- The Subject Was Roses (1968)
- The Only Game in Town (1970)
- Desperate Characters (1971), also director and producer
- John O'Hara's Gibbsville (also known as The Turning Point of Jim Malloy) (1975), also director
- From Noon till Three (1976), also director and producer
- Once in Paris... (1978), also director and producer
- The Gig (1985), also director and producer
- The Luckiest Man in the World (1989), also director
- Money Play$ (1998), also director

=== Books ===
- I Wake Up Screening: Everything You Need to Know about Making Independent Films Including a Thousand Reasons Not To (1993)
- Writing for Love And/Or Money: Outtakes from a Life Spec, the Early Years (2007)

== Awards ==
- 1962 Obie Award for Who'll Save the Plowboy?
- 1964 New York Drama Critics' Circle Award for The Subject Was Roses
- 1964 Outer Critics Circle Award for The Subject Was Roses
- 1964 New York Theatre Club Award for The Subject Was Roses
- 1965 Tony Award for The Subject Was Roses
- 1965 Pulitzer Prize for The Subject Was Roses
- 1966 Doctor of Letters from Dartmouth College
- 1971 Silver Bear at the 21st Berlin International Film Festival for Desperate Characters
