= Who, Me? =

Malodorant chemical weapon

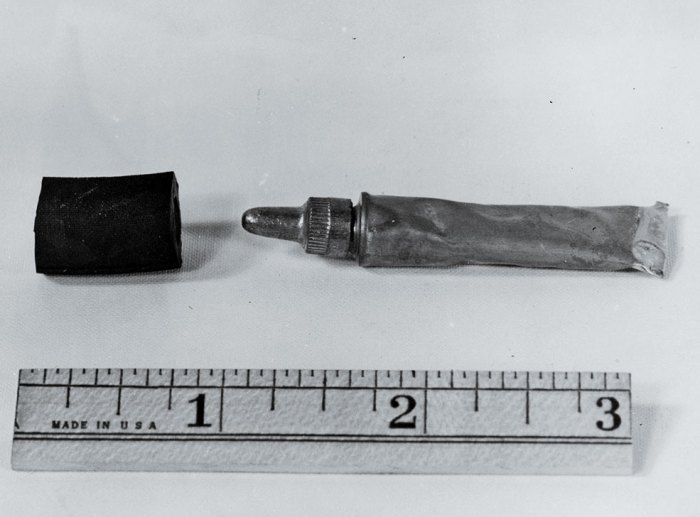
"Who, Me?" was deployed in a small squeezable container.

Who, Me? was a top secret, sulfurous, non-lethal chemical weapon developed by MIT graduate Ernest Crocker while working in the Research and Development Branch (R&D) of the Office of Strategic Services (OSS) during World War II, to be used by the French Resistance against German officers. The chemical smelled strongly of fecal matter, and was issued in pocket atomizers intended to be unobtrusively sprayed on a German officer, humiliating him and, by extension, demoralizing the occupying German forces.

The experiment was very short-lived, however. The weapon used a high concentration of extremely volatile sulfur compounds that were very difficult to control: the person who did the spraying would end up smelling as bad as the one targeted. The product passed handling tests in 1944 and 600 tubes with rubber tubing caps were manufactured, but the war ended before they could be used.
