= Vigil in the Night (novella) =

1939 novella by A. J. Cronin

- Author: A. J. Cronin
- Language: English
- Genre: Novella
- Published: February 2010 A. J. Cornell Publications (US)
- Publication place: (US)
- Media type: Print (Paperback)
- Pages: 176 pp.
- ISBN: 0-9727439-6-0

Vigil in the Night is a serial novella by A. J. Cronin, initially published in 1939 in Good Housekeeping. It tells the tale of two nurses: Anne Lee, who devotes herself to serving others, and her younger sister Lucy, who tries to get everything in life for herself. When Lucy’s negligence causes the death of a young patient, Anne takes the blame to protect her sister, an act that threatens to destroy the bright career that lies before her. The story was printed in book form by various publishers and was adapted into the film Vigil in the Night (1940).
