= The Boy Friends =

1930 film

The Boy Friends is a series of American Pre-Code comedy short films produced by Hal Roach and released by Metro-Goldwyn-Mayer between 1930 and 1932. Based around the comic adventures and escapades of a group teenagers and young adults, the series was spun off from the long-running Our Gang short film series (also known as The Little Rascals).

Fifteen shorts were produced by Roach for The Boy Friends series, which was succeeded in 1932 by The Taxi Boys series.

== Production ==
Like the Our Gang shorts of the time, The Boy Friends films are two-reel short subjects produced by Hal Roach through Metro-Goldwyn-Mayer. They feature teenaged and young adult actors - including some, particularly Mickey Daniels and Mary Kornman, who as children had starred in the early silent Our Gang shorts. Grady Sutton was also a lead player in the series. Daniels and Sutton appear in every short, while Kornman appears in all but one (1932's You're Telling Me). Each short took roughly one week to film, with four-man th intervals between principal photography on each production.

Roach released three The Boy Friends films in 1930: Doctor's Orders, Ladies Last, and Bigger and Better. The series added seven installments in 1931: Blood and Thunder, High Gear, Love Fever, Air Tight, Call a Cop, Mama Loves Papa, and The Kickoff. Finally, 1932 saw the release of the last five films: Love Pains, The Knockout, Too Many Women, Wild Babies, and You're Telling Me. At least some of the films in the series took place at Elmira College, an actual school located in Roach's home town of Elmira, New York.

== Characters ==
- Mickey (Mickey Daniels): The main character. Appears in all entries.
- Mary (Mary Kornman): Mickey's girl friend. Appears in all entries except You're Telling Me.
- Grady "Alabam" Sutton (Grady Sutton): Mickey's best friend and sidekick. Appears in all entries.
- Dave (David Sharpe): Mickey and Grady's friend. He is their rival in his first short. Last appears in Call a Cop!
- Gertie (Gertrude Messinger): Dave's love interest. Last appears in The Kick-Off.
- Dorothy (Dorothy Granger): Alabam's love interest. Last appears in Love Fever.
- Betty (Betty Bolen): Alabam's love interest. Appears in Air-Tight, Mama Loves Papa, The Kick-Off!, Love Pains, The Knockout, You're Telling Me and Wild Babies.
- Jacqui (Jacqueline Wells): Appears in The Knockout and You're Telling Me.

== Filmography ==
=== 1930 ===
- Doctor's Orders
- Bigger and Better
- Ladies Last

=== 1931 ===
- Blood and Thunder
- High Gear
- Love Fever
- Air-Tight
- Call a Cop!
- Mama Loves Papa
- The Kick-Off!

=== 1932 ===
- Love Pains
- The Knock-Out
- You're Telling Me
- Too Many Women
- Wild Babies

== Sources ==
- Wood, Bret (2017). "Introduction to the Boy Friends Shorts". Turner Classic Movies. Archived from the original on November 9, 2017.
