= Alice Adams =

Alice Adams may refer to:

- Alice Adams (novel), a 1921 Pulitzer Prize–winning novel by Booth Tarkington
- Alice Adams (1923 film), a 1923 film based on the novel by Booth Tarkington
- Alice Adams (1935 film), a 1935 film based on the novel by Booth Tarkington
- Alice Adams (writer) (1926–1999), American novelist and writer from Fredericksburg, Virginia
- Alice Adams (artist) (born 1930), American artist
- Alice Adams (long jumper) (born 1905), American long jumper, 2nd at the 1923 USA Outdoor Track and Field Championships
