= Little Tough Guys in Society =

1938 film by Erle C. Kenton

- Theatrical Poster
- Directed by: Erle C. Kenton
- Written by: Edward Eliscu; Mortimer Offner
- Produced by: Max H. Gordon
- Starring: Little Tough Guys
- Cinematography: George Robinson
- Music by: Frank Skinner
- Distributed by: Universal Studios
- Release date: November 1, 1938
- Running time: 63 minutes
- Country: United States
- Language: English

Little Tough Guys in Society is a 1938 Universal Studios film that starred several of the Dead End Kids. It was the second film that Universal made in their series and the first of three that they made without any of the original Dead End Kids.

== Plot ==
Mrs. Berry, a socialite, hires a psychiatrist to care for her son Randolph. He exhibits antisocial behavior and stays bedridden all day. The doctor determines that if he was exposed to other boys of a lesser social stature he will break out of his shell and resume his place in society. They contact a place in the city and hire six underprivileged kids to come out to the country to help out. The boys who arrive are not the boys who were originally hired, but a gang of misfits who are wanted for destroying a glass factory. They quickly help Randolph overcome his antisocial behavior and assist in capturing some thieves who broke into Mrs. Berry's residence while Randolph's birthday party was taking place. The boys are then discovered to be on the run from the police, but with the assistance of a judge attending the party, they surrender and agree to return to New York and face their punishment.

== Cast ==
=== The Little Tough Guys ===
- Frankie Thomas as Danny
- Harris Berger as Sailor
- Hally Chester as Murphy
- Charles Duncan as Monk
- David Gorcey as Yap
- William Benedict as Trouble

=== Additional Cast ===
- Mischa Auer as Dr. Trenkle
- Mary Boland as Mrs. Berry
- Edward Everett Horton as Oliver
- Helen Parrish as Penny
- Jackie Searl as Randolf Berry
- Peggy Stewart as Jane
- Harold Huber as Uncle Buck
- David Oliver as Footman
- Stanley Blystone as Policeman
- Eddie Hall as Cabbie
- Samuel S. Hinds as Judge
- Lon McCallister as unnamed
- Sarah Padden as Victim
- Frances Robinson as Guest
- Dick Rush as Jim

== The writers ==
The writers Mortimer Offner and Edward Eliscu were related by marriage. Eliscu's wife Stella Bloch was Mortimer's cousin. Eliscu and Offner were both eventually blacklisted.
