= Roshanara =

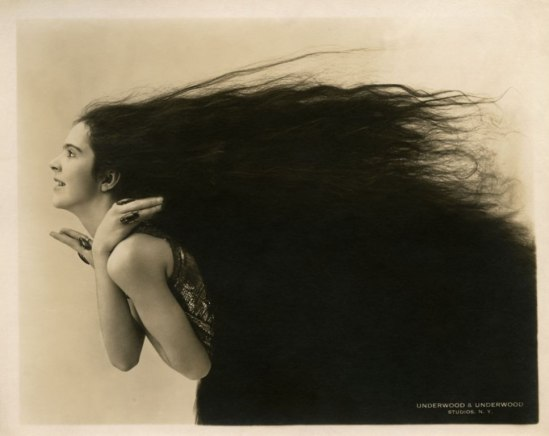
- Roshanara by Underwood & Underwood
- Born: Olive Katherine Craddock; 22 January 1894; Calcutta, British India
- Died: 14 July 1926 (aged 32); Asheville, North Carolina, United States
- Occupation: dancer

Olive Katherine Craddock (22 January 1894 – 14 July 1926) was an Anglo-Indian dancer trained in British India who danced under the name Roshanara. She was known for showing central Indian dance techniques in Britain and America. She died in her thirties from appendicitis.

== Biography ==
Craddock was born on 22 January 1892 in Calcutta. Her father was John James Nolan Craddock who was Anglo-Indian and her mother was Mabel Mary Ann Adams who was British. She learned to dance in India before she moved to Britain around 1909. Craddock took the name Roshanara which built on the celebrity of the princess Roshanara Begum.

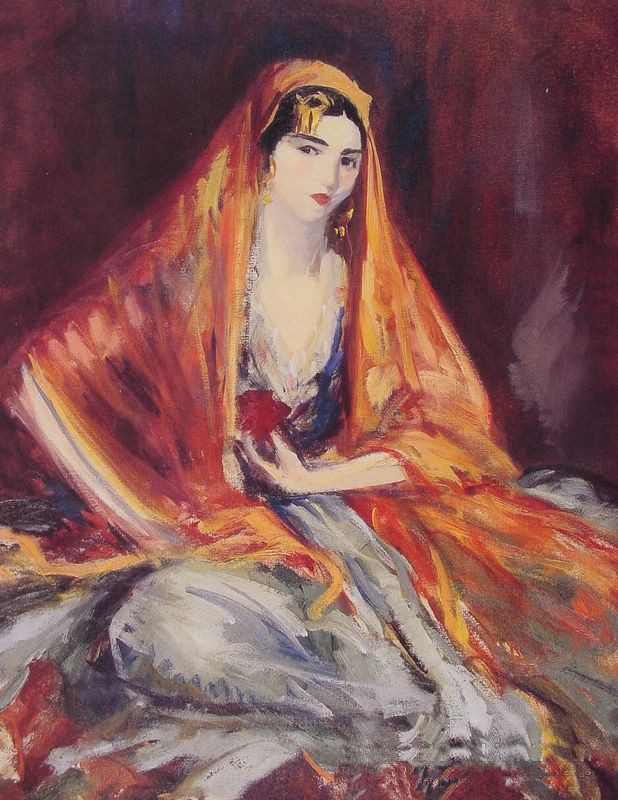
Roshanara by Robert Henri

She danced with Loie Fuller's company and then undertook training with the Spanish dancer Carmen Tórtola Valencia. In 1911 she danced in London in Oscar Asche's Kismet and then as Zobeide in Scheherazade. This role was with the Ballets Russes at Covent Garden. The following year she appeared with Anna Pavlova's dance company as a speciality dancer. She had several dances that were performed using extracts from the 1880s Oriental opera Lakmé by the French composer Léo Delibes.

Craddock started to work in the United States in 1916 where she appeared in Vaudeville theatres. In 1917 she and Japanese dancer Michio Itō were the specialty dancers with Adolf Bolm's company Ballet Intime. Roshanara also appeared with Ratan Devi who was a British singer who had been to India to study music. Devi was accompanied by her husband Ananda Coomaraswamy who was employed by the Boston Museum of Art as an expert on Indian culture. Coomaraswamy wrote about how Roshanara was an authentic nautch dancer in contrast to Ruth St Denis who a few years before had shown Indian style dances.

Craddock arrived as an "alien" emigrant in New York in 1923. Craddock taught dancing and the later film star, Bette Davis was one of her pupils. She died in her thirties on 16 July 1926 in Asheville, North Carolina. from appendicitis.

== Works ==
Roshanara copyrighted ten of her dances.

== Legacy ==
Craddock has been compared to the American dancer Ruth St. Denis who popularised oriental style dances in America. Although Craddock had been trained in India she devoted her time to improving the perfection of her dance. Ruth St. Denis was inspired by Oriental style dance and she founded her own dance school where her students included Martha Graham. Craddock never established her own school and this is considered the reason that she never had the lasting impact that Ruth St. Denis made. Deborah Jowitt writes that Craddock's dances may not have been learnt in India in fact she believes there is a lot of similarity between Craddock's style and that of St Denis some years before. St Denis however seemed to respect Craddock and she followed her career.

Roshenara was captured by Ashcan painter Robert Henri. The painting sold for $132,500 in 2000.
