= Ananda Coomaraswamy =

Sri Lankan Tamil metaphysician (1877–1947)

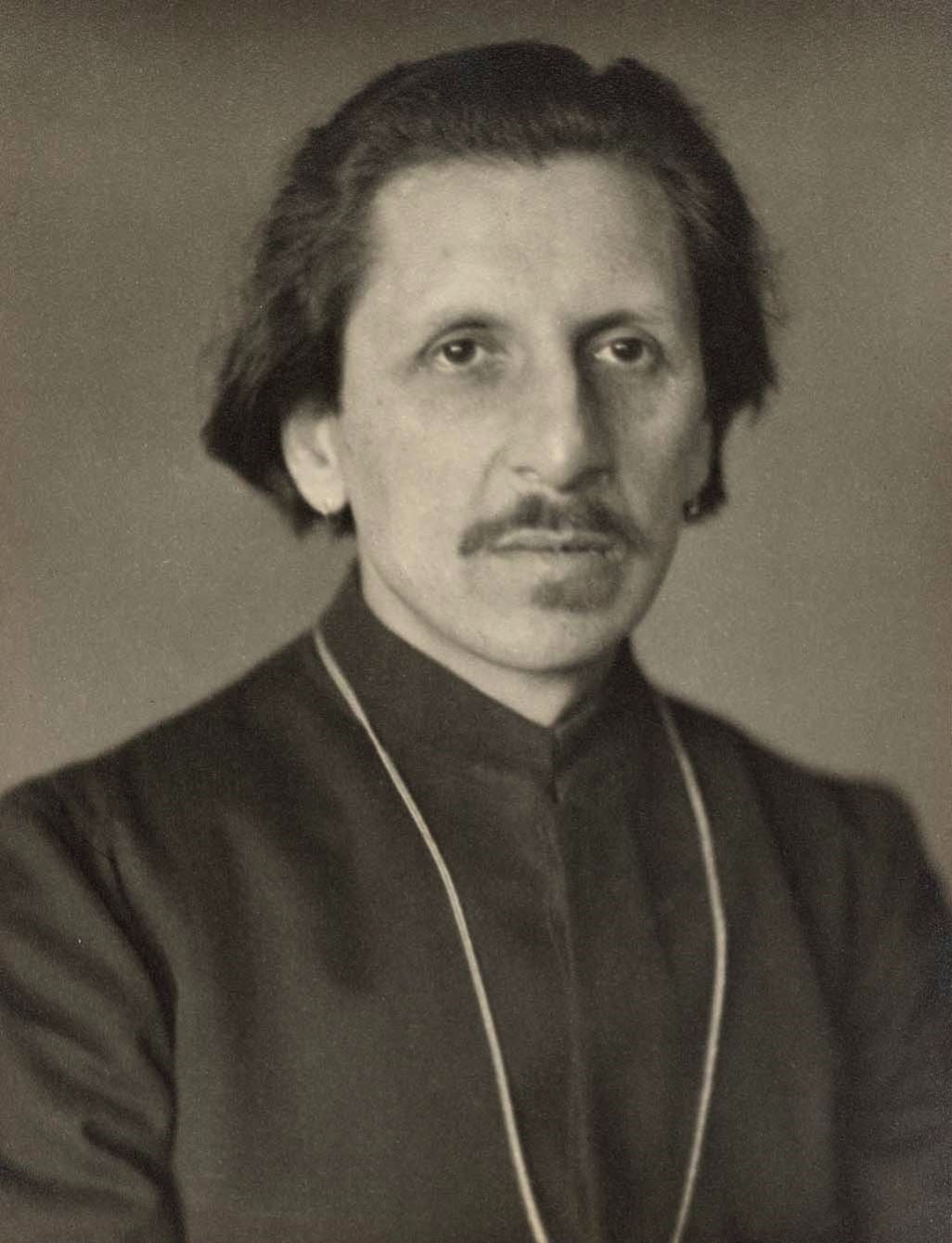
- Coomaraswamy in 1916
- Born: 22 August 1877; Colombo, British Ceylon
- Died: 9 September 1947 (aged 70); Needham, Massachusetts, U.S.
- Spouses: Ethel Mairet (m. 1902–1913); Ratna Devi (m. 1913–1922); Stella Bloch (m. 1922–1930); Luisa Runstein (m. 1930–1947, his death)

Philosophical work
- Era: Modern philosophy 20th-century philosophy
- Region: Indian philosophy Western philosophy
- School: Perennialism; Traditionalist School
- Main interests: Metaphysics, philosophy of art, history
- Notable works: The Dance of Shiva (1918), Hinduism and Buddhism (1943)

Ananda Kentish Muthu Coomaraswamy (Tamil: ஆனந்த குமாரசுவாமி, Āṉanta Kumāracuvāmi; Sinhala: ආනන්ද කුමාරස්වාමි Ānanda Kumārasvāmī; 22 August 1877 − 9 September 1947) was a Ceylonese metaphysician, historian and a philosopher of Indian art who was an early interpreter of Indian culture to the West. He has been described as "the groundbreaking theorist who was largely responsible for introducing ancient Indian art to the West".

== Life ==
Ananda Kentish Coomaraswamy was born in Colombo, British Ceylon, now Sri Lanka, to the Ceylon Tamil legislator and philosopher Sir Muthu Coomaraswamy of the Ponnambalam–Coomaraswamy family and his English wife Elizabeth Beeby. His father died when Ananda was two years old, and Ananda spent much of his childhood and education abroad.

Coomaraswamy moved to England in 1879 and began attending Wycliffe College, a preparatory school in Stroud, Gloucestershire, at the age of twelve. In 1900, he graduated from University College London (UCL), with a degree in geology and botany. On 19 June 1902, Coomaraswamy married Ethel Mary Partridge, an English photographer, who then traveled with him to Ceylon. Their marriage lasted until 1913. Coomaraswamy's field work between 1902 and 1906 earned him a doctor of science for his study of Ceylonese mineralogy, and prompted the formation of the Geological Survey of Ceylon, which he initially directed. While in Ceylon, the couple collaborated on Mediaeval Sinhalese Art; Coomaraswamy wrote the text and Partridge provided the photographs. His work in Ceylon fueled Coomaraswamy's anti-Westernisation sentiments. After their divorce, Partridge returned to England, where she became a famous weaver and later married the writer Philip Mairet.

By 1906, Coomaraswamy had made it his mission to educate the West about Indian art, and was back in London with a large collection of photographs, actively seeking out artists to try to influence. He knew he could not rely on museum curators or other members of the cultural establishment – in 1908 he wrote "The main difficulty so far seems to have been that Indian art has been studied so far only by archaeologists. It is not archaeologists, but artists ... who are the best qualified to judge of the significance of works of art considered as art." By 1909, he was firmly acquainted with Jacob Epstein and Eric Gill, the city's two most important early Modernists, and soon both of them had begun to incorporate Indian aesthetics into their work. The curiously hybrid sculptures that were produced as a result can be seen to form the very roots of what is now considered British Modernism.

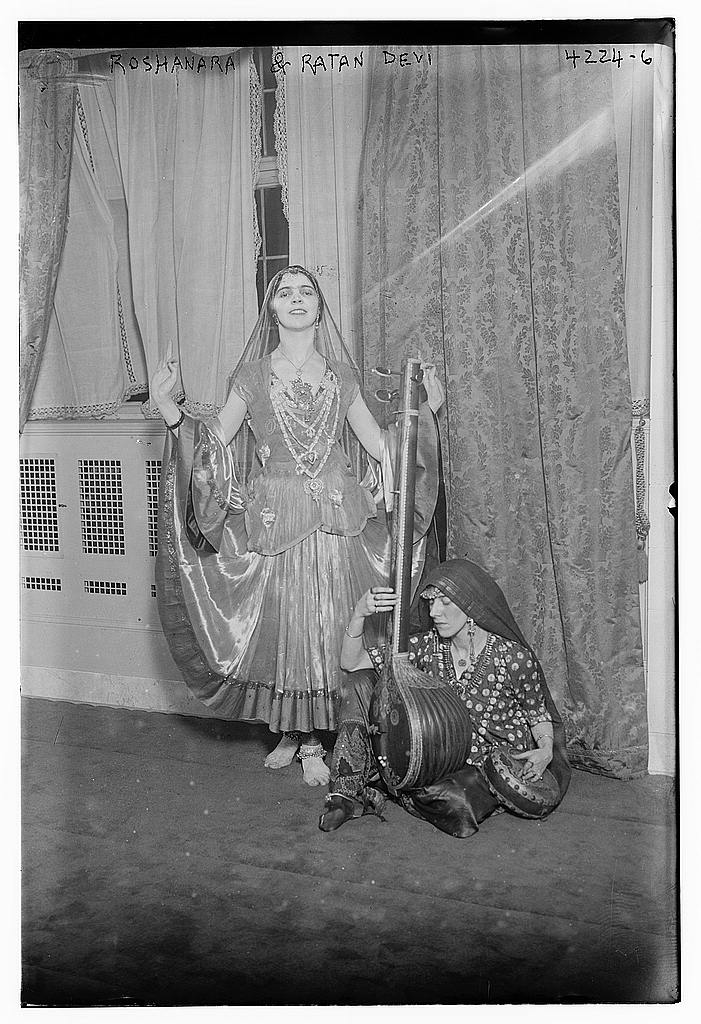
His second wife: Alice Coomaraswamy (Ratan Devi) with Roshanara

Coomaraswamy then met and married a British woman Alice Ethel Richardson and together they stayed on a houseboat in Srinagar in Kashmir. There, Coomaraswamy studied Rajput painting while his wife studied Indian music with Abdul Rahim of Kapurthala. When they returned to England, Richardson performed Indian song under the stage name Ratan Devi. She was successful and both went to America when Ratan Devi did a concert tour. While they were there, Coomaraswamy was invited to serve as the first Keeper of Indian art in the Boston Museum of Fine Arts in 1917. The couple had two children, a son, Narada, and daughter, Rohini.

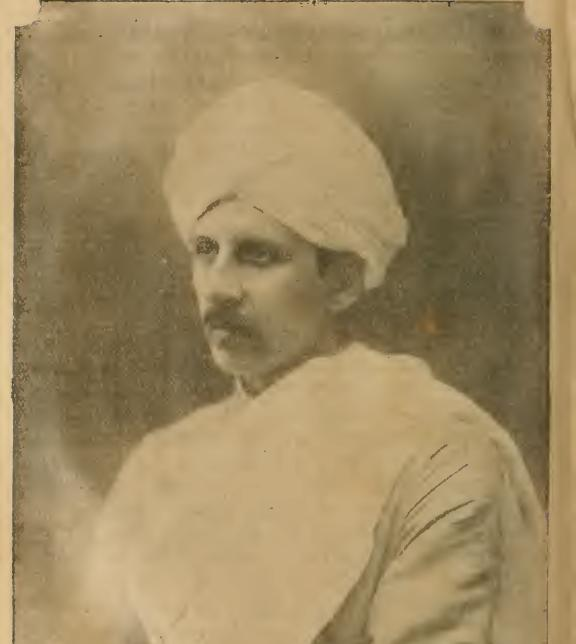
Portrait of Ananda Coomaraswamy, published 1907.

Coomaraswamy divorced his second wife after they arrived in America. He married the American artist Stella Bloch, 20 years his junior, in November 1922. Through the 1920s, Coomaraswamy and his wife were part of the bohemian art circles in New York City, Coomaraswamy befriended Alfred Stieglitz and the artists who exhibited at Stieglitz's gallery. At the same time, he studied Sanskrit and Pali religious literature as well as Western religious works. He wrote catalogues for the Boston Museum of Fine Arts and published his History of Indian and Indonesian Art in 1927.

After the couple divorced in 1930, they remained friends. Shortly thereafter, on 18 November 1930, Coomaraswamy married Argentine Luisa Runstein, 28 years younger, who was working as a society photographer under the professional name Xlata Llamas. They had a son, Coomaraswamy's third child Rama Ponnambalam (1929-2006), who became a physician and convert at age 22 to the Roman Catholic Church. Following Vatican II, Rama became a critic of the reforms and author of Catholic Traditionalist works. He was also ordained a Traditionalist Roman Catholic priest, despite the fact that he was married and had a living wife. Rama Coomaraswamy studied in England and then in India, learning Hindi and Sanskrit.

During his long career, Coomaraswamy was instrumental in bringing Eastern art to the West. While at the Boston Museum of Fine Arts, he built the first substantial collection of Indian art in the United States. In 1933, Coomaraswamy's title there changed from curator to Fellow for Research in Indian, Persian, and Mohammedan Art.

After Coomaraswamy's death, his widow Luisa Runstein, acted as a guide and resource for students of his work.

== Contributions ==
Coomaraswamy made important contributions to the philosophy of art, literature, and religion. In Ceylon, he applied the lessons of William Morris to Ceylonese culture and, with his wife Ethel, produced a groundbreaking study of Ceylonese crafts and culture. While in India, he was part of the literary circle around Rabindranath Tagore, and he contributed to the "Swadeshi" movement, an early phase of the struggle for Indian independence. In the 1920s, he made discoveries in the history of Indian art, particularly some distinctions between Rajput and Mughal painting, and published his book Rajput Painting. At the same time, he amassed an unmatched collection of Rajput and Mughal paintings, which he took with him to the Museum of Fine Arts, Boston, when he joined its curatorial staff in 1917. Through 1932, from his base in Boston, he produced two kinds of publications: scholarship in his curatorial field and introductions to Indian and Asian art and culture, typified by The Dance of Shiva, a collection of essays that remain in print to this day. Deeply influenced by René Guénon, he became one of the founders of the Traditionalist School. His books and essays on art and culture, symbolism and metaphysics, scripture, folklore and myth, and other topics, offer a cross-cultural perspective rooted in sources from multiple traditions. He once remarked, "I actually think in both Eastern and Christian terms—Greek, Latin, Sanskrit, Pali, and to some extent Persian and Chinese." Alongside the deep and not infrequently difficult writings of this period, he also delighted in polemical writings created for a larger audience—essays such as "Why exhibit works of art?" (1943).

In his book The Information Society: An Introduction (Sage, 2003, p. 44), Armand Mattelart credits Coomaraswamy for coining the term 'post-industrial' in 1913.

== Methodology ==
Coomaraswamy was a firm believer in the comparative method. The analysis of both texts and symbols across a wide variety of cultures and time periods allowed him to see below the surface of local interpretations and religious exclusivism to locate the bedrock of tradition. By tradition, he meant that which has been handed down from time beyond memory.

The folk has thus preserved, without understanding, the remains of old traditions that go back sometimes to the indeterminably distant past, to which we can only refer as “prehistoric”. Had the folk beliefs not indeed been once understood, we could not now speak of them as metaphysically intelligible, or explain the accuracy of their formulations.

His extensive knowledge of ancient languages allowed him access to primary sources and his understanding of metaphysics helped him discern the deeper meanings that other scholars often missed. Given the specialisation and compartmentation of knowledge that was part of the Western academic tradition, his efforts were not always appreciated. He expressed some of his feelings in a letter to Graham Carey:

What the secular mind does is to assert that we (symbolists) are reading meaning into things that originally had none: our assertion is that they are reading out the meaning. The proof of our contention lies in the perfection, consistency and universality of the pattern in which these meanings are united.

His criticism of the academic world was centered around a number of related issues. First, the academic method, by itself, was ill-equipped to deal with the way in which ideas where transmitted in non-literate cultures, due to an over-reliance on written documentation. Coomaraswamy felt that too much was left out in this approach.

By “folklore” we mean the whole and consistent body of culture which has been handed down, not in books but by word of mouth and in practice, from time beyond the reach of historical research, in the form of legends, fairy tales, ballads, games, toys, crafts, medicine, agriculture, and other rites, and forms of social organisation, especially those that we call “tribal.” This is a cultural complex independent of national and even racial boundaries, and of remarkable similarity throughout the world.

A second point of conflict was what Coomaraswamy saw as the obsessive tendency of Western scholarship to divide cultures, religions, and time periods into discrete categories in order to fit into academic organisational and mental structures.

It is equally surprising that so many scholars, meeting with some universal doctrine in a given context, so often think of it as a local peculiarity.

As a traditionalist, Coomaraswamy emphasised the continuity of culture. He felt that the connecting elements between eras had been lost by the extreme emphasis placed on change and “progress”. In his eyes, conflict between a new religion and an older one often obscured the commonalities that linked them.

The opposition of religion to folklore is often a kind of rivalry set up as between a new dispensation and an older tradition, the gods of the older cult becoming the evil spirits of the newer.

He pointed out that the Greek word daimon, which at root indicates something given, was synonymous with the Christian Holy Spirit, God's gift of life., arguing that if Christian propagandists chose to emphasise the demonic at the expense of the daimon, it was only to further their own cause.

A third issue that raised his ire was the racism inherent in the Western world's criticism and misinterpretation of traditional and tribal cultures, attitudes tied closely to literacy and the attendant idea of progress.

It was possible for Aristotle, starting from the premise that a man, being actually cultured, may also become literate, to ask whether there is a necessary or merely an accidental connection of literacy with culture. Such a question can hardly arise for those to whom illiteracy implies, as a matter of course, ignorance, backwardness, unfitness for self-government: for you, unlettered people are uncivilised peoples and vice versa—as a recent publisher's blurb expresses it: “The greatest force in civilisation is the collective wisdom of a literate people."

Like Franz Boas and a handful of others, Coomaraswamy waged a constant war against racism with the press and academic world. He was a strong advocate for Indian independence and was pressured to leave England for publicly suggesting that Indians not fight in the First World War.

Unlike Rene Guenon and others who shared many of his understandings, Coomaraswamy was not content to describe traditional ideas from the inside out, in metaphysical terms alone.. He did not believe that science and metaphysics were in opposition, but were two different ways of looking at the world.

Coomaraswamy was critical of the writings of Carl Jung and of Theosophy, which he believed distorted the meaning of traditional ideas.

== Traditional symbolism ==
One of Coomaraswamy's most important contributions was in his study of the language of symbolism contained in images.

To have lost the art of thinking in images is precisely to have lost the proper linguistic of metaphysics and to have descended to the verbal logic of “philosophy.

His study of traditional symbols had taught him that symbols were meant to express ideas and not emotions and that a study of “styles” and “influences” would reveal little of significance.

An adequate knowledge of theology and cosmology is then indispensable to an understanding of the history of art, insofar as the actual shapes and structures of works of art are determined by their real content. Christian art, for example, begins with the representation of deity by abstract symbols, which may be geometrical, vegetable, or theriomorphic, and are devoid of any sentimental appeal whatever. An anthropomorphic symbol follows, but this is still a form and not a figuration; not made as though to function biologically or as if to illustrate a text book of anatomy or dramatic expression. Still later, the form is sentimentalised; the features of the crucified are made to exhibit human suffering, the type is completely humanised, and where we began with the shape of humanity as an analogical representation of the idea of God, we end with the portrait of the artist's mistress posing as the Madonna and a representation of an all-too-human baby; the Christ is no longer a man-God, but the sort of man we can approve of.

In keeping with his traditionalist stance, he saw this process as one of gradual decay in which the human life world began to encroach gradually on the divine with an attendant growth of sentimentality and loss of meaning. He was fond of quoting the curator, John Lodge: “From the Stone Age until now, quelle dégringolade.”

Coomaraswamy spent a lot of his time documenting themes and images that appeared to be very old, given their widespread distribution. Major areas of study included:

- Solar symbolism
- Symbolism of the wheel
- The Flood story
- The “Water Cosmology” and the “Plant Style”
- Soma and the Water of Life
- Traditional cosmologies (the three worlds)
- The symbolism of snakes and reptiles
- The symbolism of birds and other “psychopomps” (soul carriers)
- The heavenly ladder
- The cosmic dome and the hole in the sky with its guardian figure
- The Thread-spirit (sutratman) doctrine that underlies the symbolism of the fiber arts
- The concept of ether and the symbolism of fire
- Divine bi-unity (male/female) as one
- The inverted tree and arboreal symbolism
- The Symplegades (Clashing Rocks) and the Coincidence of Opposites

Coomaraswamy observed these symbols in different cultures and time periods, both in religious writings and in folklore. He saw little opposition between religion and folklore. Folklore was transmitted in the vernacular as compared to the sacred languages in which scripture was delivered and interpreted. Folklore was less moralistic but its themes shared a common source with those of religion; Jack's beanstalk was Jacob's ladder. Religion was not “contaminated” by folklore but used it to express the same ideas in a more rationalised and moralised setting, just as Plato used myths to explain his philosophy.

The designs we found in Neolithic times were derived from older images. Thus the continuity of tradition reveals itself best in art, which expresses ideas. Even when religious philosophies developed with writing, a continuity of meaning could be observed often because the change was gradual and the old and the new existed side by side.

In the Vedas, the belief {that all life began in the “Waters”} appears in the form of an old popular theory, for which are substituted the successively more philosophical concepts of Space Cosmology, of a belief in the origin of the world in Non-being, in an origin of the world from Being, and finally in the conception of Brahman (the Absolute) as world-ground. The Water Cosmology, it is true, persists side by side with, and linked with these deeper views, even in post-Vedic literature; but it is typically not a creation of the Vedas and seems to belong to an even older stratum of ideas than that which is developed in the Vedas.

The ideas expressed by images were made explicit by writing, which allowed for a greater degree of abstraction and elaboration but since the concrete preceded the abstract, all philosophy started with images. In the absence of writing, the tribal cultures of the world have preserved a good deal of this older symbolism.

Coomaraswamy also maintained that traditional technologies (like the needle or the fire drill) were applications of metaphysical ideas, just as modern technology is an expression of scientific principles.

Primitive man knew nothing of a possible divorce of function and meaning: all his inventions were applied meaning.

The American art historian, Carl Schuster, who corresponded with Coomarawamy and learned much from him, would go on to identify some of the Paleolithic sources of this symbolism.

== Perennial philosophy ==
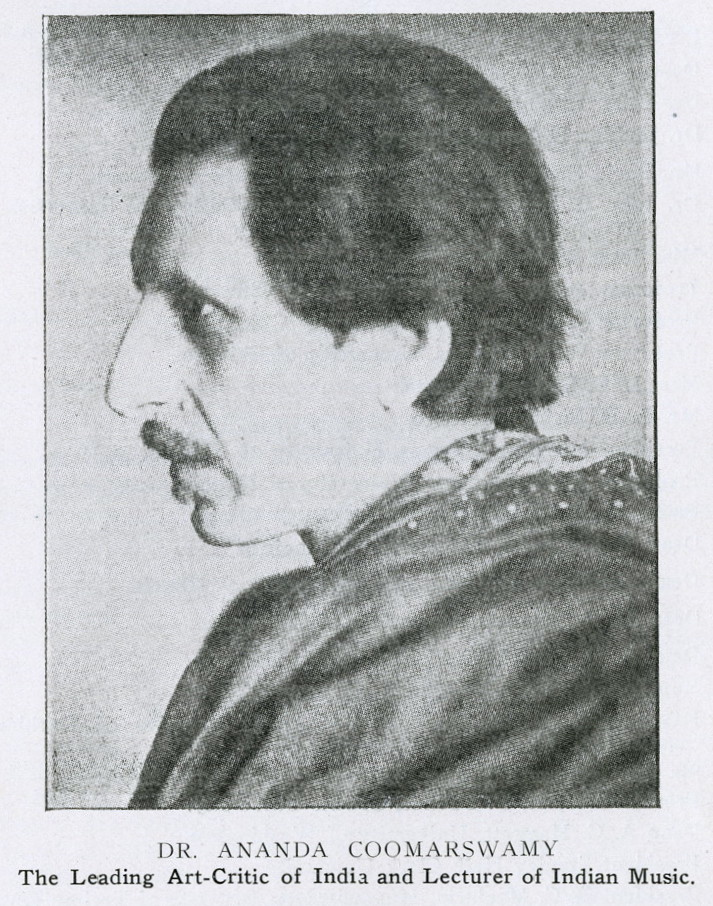
Portrait of Coomaraswamy printed in the April 1916 issue of The Hindusthanee Student.

He was described by Heinrich Zimmer as "That noble scholar upon whose shoulders we are still standing." While serving as a curator to the Boston Museum of Fine Arts in the latter part of his life, he devoted his work to the explication of traditional metaphysics and symbolism. His writings of this period are filled with references to Plato, Plotinus, Clement, Philo, Augustine, Aquinas, Shankara, Eckhart, Rumi and other mystics. When asked how he defined himself foremost, Coomaraswamy said he was a "metaphysician", referring to the concept of perennial philosophy, or sophia perennis.

Along with René Guénon and Frithjof Schuon, Coomaraswamy is regarded as one of the three founders of Perennialism, also called the Traditionalist School. Several articles by Coomaraswamy on the subject of Hinduism and the perennial philosophy were published posthumously in the quarterly journal Studies in Comparative Religion alongside articles by Schuon and Guénon among others.

Although he agreed with Guénon on the universal principles, Coomaraswamy's works are very different in form. By vocation, he was a scholar who dedicated the last decades of his life to "searching the Scriptures". He offers a perspective on the tradition that complements Guénon's. He was extremely perceptive regarding aesthetics and wrote dozens of articles on traditional arts and mythology. His works are also finely balanced intellectually. Although born in the Hindu tradition, he had a deep knowledge of the Western tradition as well as a great expertise in, and love for, Greek metaphysics, especially that of Plotinus, the founder of Neoplatonism.

Coomaraswamy built a bridge between East and West that was designed to be two-way: among other things, his metaphysical writings aimed at demonstrating the unity of the Vedanta and Platonism. His works also sought to rehabilitate original Buddhism, as he believed that the distance (i.e. differences) between Buddhism and Hinduism was artificially created by Western Indologists. In his book, Hinduism and Buddhism, he wrote:

The more superficially one studies Buddhism, the more it seems to differ from the Brahmanism in which it originated; the more profound our study, the more difficult it becomes to distinguish Buddhism from Brahmanism, or to say in what respects, if any, Buddhism is really unorthodox.

== Thought and major works ==
Coomaraswamy’s intellectual work spanned Indian art, symbolism, religion, and philosophy. He emphasised the metaphysical and spiritual foundations of traditional cultures and critiqued modern industrial and materialist perspectives in contrast to what he saw as the integrated worldview of traditional societies. His major writings include The Dance of Shiva, Hinduism and Buddhism, and the address The Religious Basis of the Forms of Indian Society (1946), in which he articulated his understanding of Indian social institutions in religious and philosophical terms.

=== Views on caste and social order ===
In The Religious Basis of the Forms of Indian Society, Coomaraswamy interpreted the traditional Indian social order, including caste (varṇa), not merely as a hierarchy of status but as an expression of metaphysical principles and vocational responsibilities. He described caste divisions as “born of the Sacrifice” and linked them to the idea that qualities and operations are distributed according to divine or cosmic order, rather than racial or purely economic logic. He framed the notion of sva-dharma (one’s own duty) as the basis for social roles and argued that institutions reflect an application of metaphysical doctrine and are stable because they encode an accepted cosmic pattern. Coomaraswamy criticised modern conceptions of equality and criticised reducing human vocation to jobs determined by economics, asserting that abolishing caste in favour of such models would “not be a solution, but much rather a dissolution.”

== Works ==
For a complete bibliography, see James S. Crouch, A Bibliography of Ananda Kentish Coomarswamy. Indira Gandhi National Center for the Arts, Manohar, New Delhi, (2002). Corrigenda to the above volume see at Corrigenda to A Bibliography of Ananda Kentish Coomaraswamy.

Extensive bibliography was also compiled by the author's son:

Ananda Kentish Coomaraswamy: A Working Bibliography, compiled by Dr. Rama P. Coomaraswamy (New Delhi: Lalit Kala Academi, n.d.)

Traditional art

- "A Plea for the Teaching of Indian Music in Ceylon", Journal of the Ceylon University Association, I, No.2 (Colombo 1906)
- Elements of Buddhist Iconography, Harvard University Press, 1935.
- Figures of Speech or Figures of Thought?: The Traditional View of Art, (World Wisdom 2007)
- Introduction To Indian Art, (Kessinger Publishing, 2007)
- Buddhist Art, (Kessinger Publishing, 2005)
- Guardians of the Sundoor: Late Iconographic Essays, (Fons Vitae, 2004)
- History of Indian and Indonesian Art, (Kessinger Publishing, 2003)
- Teaching of Drawing in Ceylon (1906, Colombo Apothecaries)
- The Indian Craftsman (1909, Probsthain: London)
- Voluspa; The Sibyl's Saying (1909, Essex House Press, London)
- Viśvakarmā; Examples of Indian Architecture, Sculpture, Painting, Handicraft (1914, London)
- Vidyāpati: Bangīya Padābali; Songs of the Love of Rādhā and Krishna, (1915, The Old Bourne press: London)
- The Mirror of Gesture: Being the Abhinaya Darpaṇa of Nandikeśvara (with Duggirāla Gōpālakr̥ṣṇa) (1917, Harvard University Press; 1997, South Asia Books,)
- Indian Music (1917, G. Schirmer; 2006, Kessinger Publishing,
- A Catalog of Sculptures by John Mowbray-Clarke: Shown at the Kevorkian Galleries, New York, from May the seventh to June the seventh, 1919. (1919, New York: Kevorkian Galleries, co-authored with Mowbray-Clarke, John, H. Kevorkian, and Amy Murray)
- Rajput Painting, (B.R. Publishing Corp., 2003)
- Early Indian Architecture: Cities and City-Gates, (South Asia Books, 2002) I
- The Origin of the Buddha Image, (Munshiram Manoharlal Pub Pvt Ltd, 2001)
- The Transformation of Nature in Art, (Sterling Pub Private Ltd, 1996)
- Bronzes from Ceylon, chiefly in the Colombo Museum, (Dept. of Govt. Print, 1978)
- Early Indian Architecture: Palaces, (Munshiram Manoharlal, 1975)
- The Arts & Crafts of India & Ceylon, (Farrar, Straus, 1964)
- Christian and Oriental Philosophy of Art, (Dover Publications, 1956)
- Archaic Indian Terracottas, (Klinkhardt & Biermann, 1928)
- Yaksas, (Munshiram Manoharlal Pub Pvt Ltd, 1998) ISBN 978-81-215-0230-6
- L'art de l'ornementation, (Éditions i, 2019) ISBN 978-2-37650-037-7
- La sculpture bouddhiste, (Éditions i, 2021) ISBN 978-2-37650-058-2
- L'art hindou, (Éditions i, 2024) ISBN 978-2-37650-138-1

Metaphysics

- Hinduism and Buddhism, (Kessinger Publishing, 2007; Golden Elixir Press, 2011)
- Myths of the Hindus & Buddhists (with Sister Nivedita) (1914, H. Holt; 2003, Kessinger Publishing)
- Buddha and the Gospel of Buddhism (1916, G. P. Putnam's sons; 2006, Obscure Press,)
- A New Approach to the Vedas: An Essay in Translation and Exegesis, (South Asia Books, 1994)
- The Living Thoughts of Gotama the Buddha, (Fons Vitae, 2001)
- Time and Eternity, (Artibus Asiae, 1947)
- Perception of the Vedas, (Manohar Publishers and Distributors, 2000)
- Coomaraswamy: Selected Papers, Volume 2, Metaphysics, (Princeton University Press, 1977)

Social criticism

- Am I My Brothers Keeper, (Ayer Co, 1947)
- The Dance of Shiva – Fourteen Indian Essays Turn Inc., New York; 2003, Kessinger Publishing,
- The village community and modern progress (12 pages) (Colombo Apothecaries, 1908)
- Essays in National Idealism (Colombo Apothecaries, 1910)
- Bugbear of Literacy, (Sophia Perennis, 1979)
- What is Civilisation?: and Other Essays. Golgonooza Press, (UK),
- Spiritual Authority and Temporal Power in the Indian Theory of Government, (Oxford University Press, 1994)
- The Religious Basis of the Forms of Indian Society, (Orientalia, 1946)

Posthumous collections

- The Door in the Sky. Coomaraswamy on Myth and Meaning, (Princeton University Press, 1997)
- Coomaraswamy: Selected Papers, 3 volumes: Traditional Art and Symbolism, Metaphysics, His Life and Work, (Princeton University Press, 1977)
- The Essential Ananda K. Coomaraswamy, (2003, World Wisdom)
- Guardians of the Sun-Door, (Fons Vitae, 2004)

== See also ==
- Ivan Aguéli
- Titus Burckhardt
- Calico Museum of Textiles
- Comparative Religion
- Esoterism
- René Guénon
- Seyyed Hossein Nasr
- Martin Lings
- Whitall Perry
- Huston Smith
- William Stoddart
- Mateus Soares de Azevedo
- Michel Valsan
- Advaita Vedanta
- Carl Schuster

== Sources ==
- T.Wignesan, "Ananda K. Coomaraswamy's Aesthetics" # Tamil studies Now published in the collection: T.Wignesan. Rama and Ravana at the Altar of Hanuman: On Tamils, Tamil Literature & Tamil Culture. Allahabad:Cyberwit.net, 2008, 750p. & at Chennai: Institute of Asian Studies, 2007, 439p.
- "Ananda Kentish Coomaraswamy" in One Hundred Tamils of the 20th Century
- "Coomaraswamy, Ananda K.", Encyclopaedia of Indian Literature, vol. 1, ed. Amaresh Dutta, Sahitya Akademi (1987), p. 768. ISBN 81-260-1803-8
- Mattelart, Armand. The Information Society: An Introduction, Sage: London, Thousand Oaks, New Delhi, 2003, p. 44.
