= Alice Coomaraswamy =

British musician

Ratan Coomaraswamy
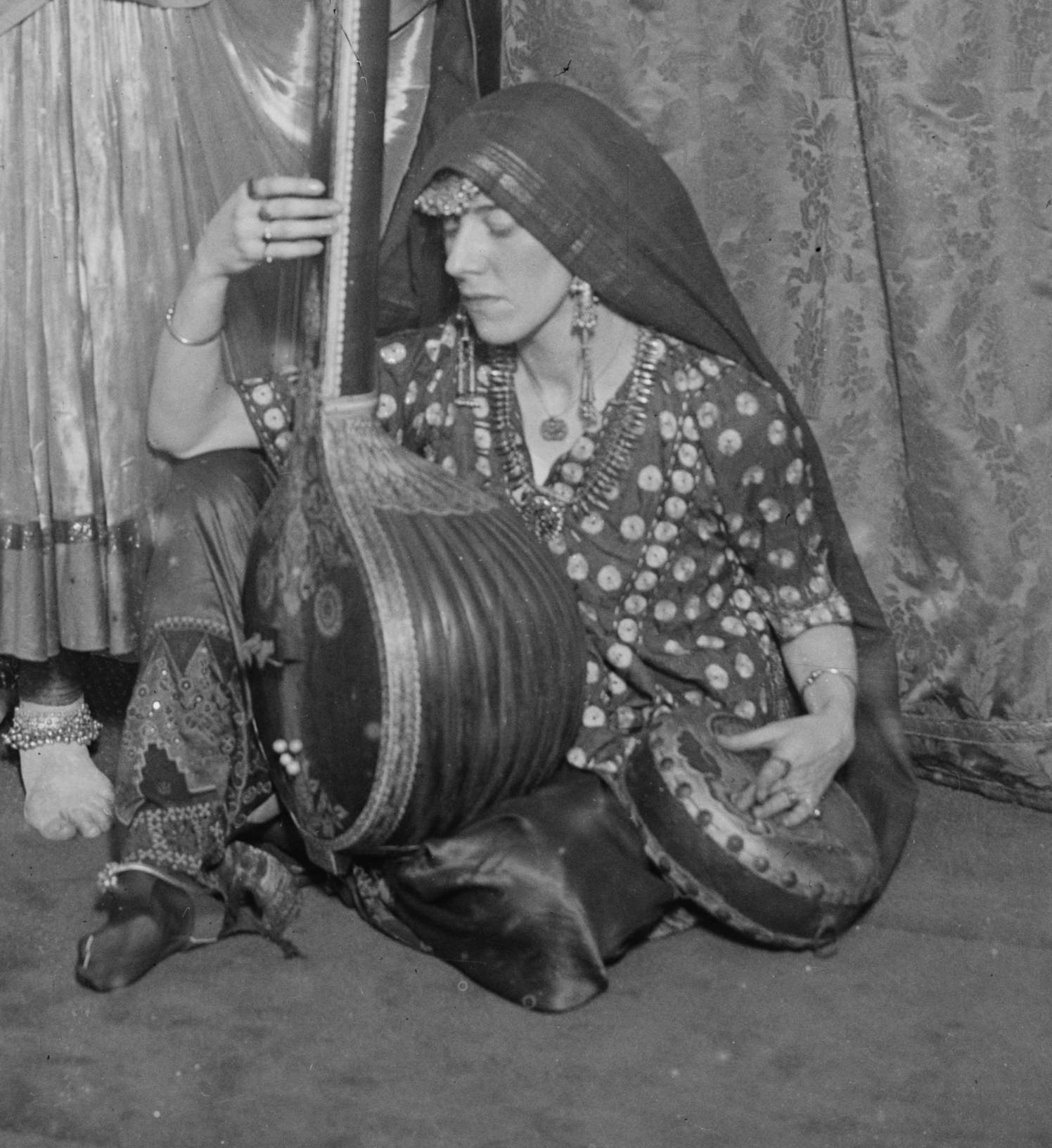
- Ratan Devi with a tanpura in 1917 in Manhattan
- Born: Alice Ethel Richardson; October 1889; Sheffield, England
- Died: July 15, 1958 (aged 68); Boston, Massachusetts
- Other name: Ratan Devi
- Occupation: Musician
- Spouse(s): Ananda Kentish Coomaraswamy; Francis Bitter

Ratan Devi Coomaraswamy (born Alice Ethel Richardson; 1889 – July 15, 1958) worked under the stage name of Ratan Devī. She recorded Indian music and was a performer of Hindu songs and poems, and went on concert tours in Britain and America. Martin Clayton identifies Alice as one of the significant women overlooked with regard to music in the British Empire.

== Biography ==
Alice Ethel Richardson was born in October 1889 in Sheffield, England, to George Richardson and Sarah Faulkner.

In 1907 Alice visited her friend Philip Mairet, who was part of the same group of artists as art historian Ananda Kentish Coomaraswamy and his wife, the hand weaver and dyer Ethel Coomaraswamy. The following year, she began an affair with Ananda. Ethel had not delivered an heir, and her husband wanted a child. He made no secret of his affair and eventually proposed that he should take a second partner. Ethel was aghast at this suggestion and vacated the marital home.

Alice married Coomaraswamy in 1913 in St Pancras, London. They would in time have two children, Narada Coomaraswamy and Rohini Coomaraswamy. Together they went to India and stayed on a houseboat in Srinagar in Kashmir. Coomaraswamy studied Rajput painting whilst Alice studied Indian music with Abdul Rahim of Kapurthala. When they returned to England, Alice performed Indian song under the stage name Ratan Devi. She was successful and toured around Britain where she would sing after an introductory talk by her husband.

In 1913 she published Thirty Songs from the Punjab and Kashmir, which was co-authored with her husband. The book gave the musical notation for thirty songs and included an introduction by Bengal polymath Rabindranath Tagore, who was very gracious about Alice's singing. Apart from the press, she also received good reviews from the composer Percy Grainger, the playwright George Bernard Shaw and the poet W. B. Yeats.

In 1916 Alice became pregnant as a result of, according to the occultist and magician Aleister Crowley, becoming involved in sex magic rituals. Crowley attempted to use further magic to create a "safe pregnancy"; the pregnancy came to end in a miscarriage. Alice and her husband were both in America in 1917 where under the stage name Ratan Devi she completed a concert tour. Whilst they were there, Coomaraswamy was invited to serve as a research fellow on Indian art in the Boston Museum of Fine Arts in 1917. According to Crowley, Alice pleaded with him to take her back but he said that he would only do this if she gave up her husband. Alice refused to do this. What is known is that Crowley wrote a story for The International that included a character named "Haramzada Swami" where Haramzada meant "bastard" in Hindustani.

Coomaraswamy divorced Alice and then he married the American artist Stella Bloch. Stella traveled to India and returned to the United States trained as an ethnic dancer.

Alice married Francis Bitter, becoming his first wife on May 31, 1928, in Manhattan, New York City. Bitter was known for inventing powerful magnets. He worked for Westinghouse and was a professor at Caltech in Pasadena, California, in 1930 and later at the Massachusetts Institute of Technology.

In 1931 Alice and Ananda's son Narada Coomaraswamy announced that he planned to fly across the Pacific even though he had just 115 hours' flying experience.

Alice died of a heart ailment on July 15, 1958, at Phillips House at the Massachusetts General Hospital.

== Works ==
- Thirty Songs From the Punjab and Kashmir, Recorded by Ratan Devi with Introduction and Translations by Ananda-Kentish Coomarswamy and a Foreword by Rabindranath Tagore (London, Old Bourne Press 1913).

== Sources ==
- Crooks, Edward (July 2011). John Cage's Entanglement with the Ideas of Coomaraswamy (PDF). York University. pp. 66–67.
