= Alice Adams (1923 film) =

1923 film

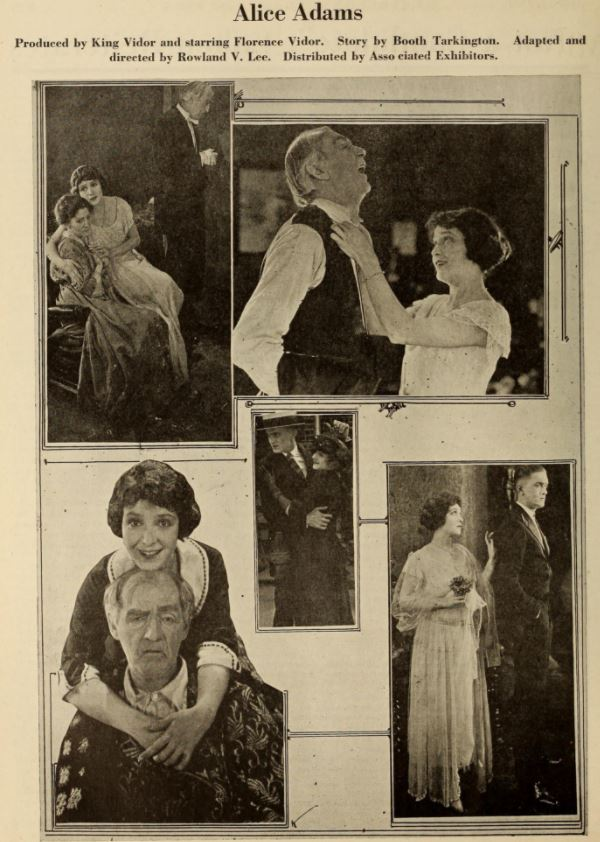
- Directed by: Rowland V. Lee
- Written by: Rowland V. Lee
- Based on: Alice Adams; 1921 novel by Booth Tarkington
- Produced by: King Vidor
- Starring: Florence Vidor
- Cinematography: George Barnes
- Distributed by: Associated Exhibitors
- Release date: April 8, 1923
- Running time: 6-7 reels
- Country: United States
- Language: Silent (English intertitles)

Alice Adams is a 1923 American silent drama film directed by Rowland V. Lee and starring Florence Vidor. It was produced by King Vidor. It is based on the 1921 novel Alice Adams by Booth Tarkington, later made into a 1935 sound film.

== Cast ==
- Florence Vidor as Alice Adams
- Claude Gillingwater as Virgil Adams
- Harold Goodwin as Walter Adams
- Margaret McWade as Mrs. Adams
- Tom Ricketts as J. A. Lamb
- Margaret Landis as Henrietta Lamb
- Gertrude Astor as Mildred Palmer
- Vernon Steele as Arthur Russell

== Preservation status ==
A fragment is preserved in the BFI National Film & Television Archive.
