= Carl Schuster =

American art historian

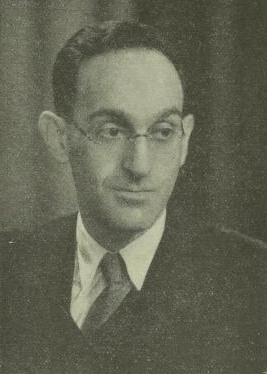
Carl Schuster

Carl Schuster (1904–1969) was an American art historian who specialized in the study of traditional symbolism.

== Life and career ==
Carl Schuster was born in Milwaukee, Wisconsin, to a prominent Jewish family. His gift for languages was evident from an early age as was an interest in puzzles, codes, and ciphers. These skills would later serve him well both as a scholar and as a cryptanalyst for the OSS during the Second World War. He received a B.A. (1927) and an M.A. (1930) from Harvard where he studied art history and oriental studies. A growing interest in traditional symbolism led him to Peking (1931–1933) where he spent three years studying with Baron Alexander Staël von Holstein, a Baltic refugee and distinguished scholar. It was during this period that he began collecting textile fragments and ventured on the first of his many field trips in search of specimens. His travels would eventually take him to some of the more remote parts of the world, photographing rock carvings, visiting small museums or private collections, and talking to missionaries, scholars, or anyone else who might have information he was seeking. Schuster returned to Europe to study at the University of Vienna with the noted art historian, Josef Strzygowski, and received his doctorate in 1934 in art history under the supervision of Julius von Schlosser.

He worked briefly as Assistant Curator of Chinese Art at the Philadelphia Art Museum but was soon back in China (1935–38) pursuing his researches and traveling until the Japanese invaded.

Schuster was assisted in his researches by academic grants from the Harvard-Yenching Institute, the Bollingen Foundation, and the Guggenheim Foundation. His easy-going manner and gift for languages provided access to people and information not available to others. He collected and photographed specimens in his widespread travels, but he never wandered randomly.

Nothing diverted him. He lived an almost ascetic life. In rural areas, he could readily satisfy hunger with a heaping bowl of fresh rice, which cost one cent. He never raised his camera to record Mao's Long March, though he witnessed it. Detained by Japanese soldiers in rural China, he recorded the event merely to explain why certain notes and negatives were missing. He literally walked through famine, revolution, and war.

Some of his rare Chinese embroideries were purchased by George Hewitt Myers for the Textile Museum and another large group was given to the Field Museum in Chicago. He also donated a group of Chinese prints to the New York Public Library as well as a collection of Buddhist woodcuts.

After World War II, he lived in Woodstock, New York, where he began to develop his ideas, publishing learned monographs on traditional design motifs. He generally placed these studies in specialized publications, whose readers, he hoped, would respond with more leads. Harvard University was on the verge of publishing a book, The Sun Bird, but he withdrew it at the last moment because he felt it contained errors.

The American Museum of Natural History (AMNH) provided him with a desk and he spent much time there and in the New York Public Library. In 1945, the American Anthropological Association sponsored an exhibition of his photographs at the AMNH illustrating his ideas about how certain symbols were shared by widely separated cultures.

Along with the artist Miguel Covarrubias, the curator Rene d'Harnoncourt, and the politician and philanthropist Nelson Rockefeller, Schuster was involved in the foundation of the Museum for Primitive Art (now part of the Michael Rockefeller wing of the Metropolitan Museum of Art).

He continued to travel, attending conferences and doing fieldwork and to correspond with others who shared his interests.

Scattered around the world, often in remote or unlikely places, were hundreds of self-trained scholars, who in response to some personal passion, sought to preserve the last remnants of fading, local traditions. They were primary sources: rigorously trained in other disciplines, self-taught in their special interests, totally dedicated in their researches. Many were far better scholars than the professionals who ignored them. Most had no one to talk to until Carl arrived. They welcomed him; opened their records to him; corresponded with him. Long after his death, letters from isolated places continued to arrive, filled with data, drawings, and photographs. His archives contain incalculable riches from a world now forgotten.

Schuyler Cammann (1912–1991), Professor of East Asian Studies at the University of Pennsylvania, first met Schuster in China in the 1930s and was greatly influenced by him.

But Carl was no mere follower; he was a pioneer in the realms of the mind. He constantly developed original ideas and experimented with linking various fields of scholarship in new and imaginative ways, always being careful to check his thoughts and his findings with the most rigorous scholarship before he shared them with others.

Schuster never sought the spotlight and his work was generally ignored in academic circles where his approach was considered out of date. Privately, he was at the center of a vast network of scholars and other interested parties who shared ideas and sought his advice.

Because he traveled so widely, he was well-known to scholars, museum curators, and congress-goers on five continents. He also served as an important link in international scholarship, not only through personal contacts during his research trips, but also because, from his home-base in Woodstock, N.Y., he conducted a kind of free information bureau for the exchange of questions and ideas among scholars and specialists in different fields, between whom he was the only direct link. There in Woodstock, he had very extensive files of notes and films, just the ordering of which was in itself a marvel of efficient organization.

Schuster's ability to gather, organize and evaluate data was extraordinary. In an age before the copier and the personal computer, he accumulated an archive comprising some 200,000 photographs, 800 rubbings (mostly of petroglyphs), 18,000 pages of correspondence in multiple languages, and a bibliography of 5670 titles filed by alphabet (Chinese, Cyrillic, Latin)—all meticulously cross-referenced. Schuster did not live to see his work completed. He died suddenly of cancer in 1969. The task fell to a friend, the anthropologist Dr. Edmund Carpenter, who agreed to write and publish his findings. The result of twenty years of labor was Materials for the Study of Social Symbolism in Ancient and Tribal Art: A Record of Tradition and Continuity, published privately in three volumes (1986–88) and distributed free of charge to scholars and libraries throughout the world. A much abbreviated version of this work was published in 1996 under the title Patterns That Connect, by Abrams Press. Schuster's archives, which contain unpublished material on a wide variety of subjects, are housed in the Museum der Kulturen in Basel, Switzerland.

Those who knew him well, and were qualified to make judgments, uniformly spoke of his brilliance, his capacity to perceive what no one before had seen. His archives reveal this better than his publications. He was a lucid correspondent, but far too hesitant in publishing. His archives are his real legacy.

== His work ==
Schuster's initial publications centered on traditional design motifs that he found preserved on textile fragments he had collected in western China during the 1930s. While the textiles themselves were not old, the designs were, having been preserved by endless imitation. Even where the motifs seemed specifically Chinese, like the return of the triumphant scholar (chuang yüan) on horseback, the oldest known prototypes were found in distant times and places.

Schuster used the method employed by many art historians of identifying significant design motifs and then tracing their distribution and meaning in different cultural and historical contexts, looking for commonalities. He tried, where possible, to provide historical evidence for the movement of these ideas and images but this proved increasingly difficult as the trail moved backward in time. Writing later about the difficulty of providing historical support for the idea of cultural contact between Asia and the Americas in prehistoric times, he defended his methodology.

However convincing some of these arguments for relationships appear to be, it is inevitable that they remain inconclusive in the absence of any historical documentation. It is the writer’s belief, nevertheless, that attempts at the comparative study of traditions, more especially artistic traditions, of the Old and New Worlds should not be abandoned because of the obvious difficulties of historical documentation, but should, on the contrary, be systematically pursued, on a frankly tentative or hypothetical basis, in an effort to assess the true extent and significance of existing similarities.

Schuster was a believer in the comparative method. Like the great art historian, folklorist and metaphysician, Ananda Coomaraswamy — from whom he learned a great deal — he believed that traditional symbolism constituted a form of language that communicated the beliefs of ancient peoples from the earliest times. As in linguistics, where many languages can arise from a common ancestor, he sought the underlying patterns that provided the links between seemingly disparate art forms. Not unlike the early navigators in the Pacific, who used the deep ocean swells to find their way around vast stretches of unexplored ocean, Schuster looked for older meanings obscured or altered by the fashion-driven arts of the palace and the propaganda of the great world religions.

We can conceive of popular tradition as an undercurrent which flows deeply beneath the reflecting surface of history, a movement of long duration and great force which, though generally hidden from academic view, comes to the surface occasionally in unexpected places, bringing with it memories of distant times and places.

He learned to look for cross-relations between the arts, following the evidence where it led, across time periods and boundaries, both geographic and academic. He expressed some of his feelings about these matters in a letter to the ethnographer Heiner Meinhard in 1967.

First in the natural sciences, and then to some extent in the humanities (eg in linguistics), empirical observations by individuals over decades established certain facts permitting certain conclusions. But in the study of the traditional arts, we are still in a pre-scientific age. Nobody seems to have any idea even how to go about learning what the world of traditional culture actually is: this can only be learned by the painstaking tracing of traditional forms on the widest possible comparative basis, empirically, without any arbitrary limits set by academic preconceptions and compartmentation.

Much of his time was taken up in collecting and comparing the motifs he felt to be of particular importance. One gauge of antiquity was how widely dispersed these designs were. He became interested in the figure of the Sun Bird, and its earthly antagonist, a turtle, snake, or other reptile. This led him to a deeper understanding of traditional cosmologies and their relation to ideas about kinship and rebirth.

An area that proved to be of primary importance was a study of joint marks, present in the arts of Asia, Oceania and the Far East. He gradually uncovered an ancient correlation between body joints and ancestors based on a metaphoric association of the human body with a plant or tree, with each limb representing a branching of the group or tribe. Indo-European and other language families preserve these ideas in the words used to describe kinship.

He was systematically building up a picture of some of the earliest beliefs and practices of mankind. A list of the topics that he investigated would be too lengthy to include here, but many of them proved to be inter-related.

- Continuous-line drawings, including such related forms as string figures, mazes, and labyrinths. These art forms were related, in turn, to joint marks.
- The design of fur garments using a technique of small, interlocking skins. The resulting designs were later transferred to other media where they formed a kind of primitive heraldry, serving to identify group membership and the social standing of the owner.
- Crossed figures (human or animal) engaged in primordial copulation at the center of the world, representing the foundation of society and the cosmos. The point of intersection of these figures was often indicated by hatching or a checkerboard pattern, used for divination and gaming in later periods. These ideas can be connected to the origin of writing systems and to early mathematical ideas.
- Y-posts, notched sticks, notched disks, rosaries, and other mnemonic devices, where the notching represented generations. These forms were related to counting systems and heavenly ladders which, in turn, were tied into the cosmological system as a means of returning to heaven by retracing one’s ancestry back to the First One.
- Finger amputation and cannibalism, which related to ideas of rebirth and kinship.

It was Schuster's study of joint marks that ultimately revealed an underlying system of genealogical iconography that he believed dated from Upper Paleolithic times. He expressed his growing excitement in a letter to a friend:

I have been undergoing a "change of life," in this sense: my work has suddenly branched out and is growing so rapidly and luxuriantly that it is simply becoming impossible to keep up with it and with everything else too. It is extremely exciting: I have at last begun excavating a vein of incalculable richness. To try to get down to earth: I have the clue, at last, to one of the central symbols of all human cultural history, which explains the survival of traditions from at least Upper Paleolithic times through all subsequent cultures.

He published his initial findings in Brazil in 1956 under the title, “Genealogical Patterns in the Old and New Worlds.” Its goals seemed modest enough for a work of such importance.

The purpose of this paper is to call attention to a type of design which occurs among various peoples in both hemispheres, and to offer an explanation of its form, which may at the same time account for its surprisingly wide distribution. Designs of this type are made up of a series of human bodies joined by their arms and legs in such a way as to form an endlessly repeating “all-over pattern” (Muster ohne Ende).

Schuster believed that Paleolithic peoples developed a system for illustrating their ideas about genealogy. Not a kinship system — which depicts actual relations — but an idealized system linked to certain cosmological ideas. The resulting designs were used to decorate the body, clothing, and tools. Their function was to clothe the individual in his/her tribal ancestry. The basic units of the system were conventionalized human figures, linked like paper dolls, arm to arm to depict relation within the same generation, and leg to arm to depict descent. Linked together, these human bodies formed geometric patterns, often of astonishing complexity. (These figures are most familiar to us as decorative motifs like hourglass figures, diamonds, St. Andrew's crosses, meanders, and spiral patterns, which appear in the traditional art forms of many cultures throughout the world.)

How did this iconography originate? Conceivably from robes of small animal skins, which resemble, by chance, human figures. These small furs were sewn together, with the fore-legs of one animal interlocked with the hind-legs of each adjacent, inverted animal. The use of split figures, emphasized by alternating colors, stressed the dual parentage that everyone enjoys, along with the concomitant notion that a human being is half male and half female, an idea which would have a long history. No examples of these furs survive from ancient times but the Tehuelche Indians of Patagonia made such robes as did other technologically simple hunting peoples.

Schuster also found abundant evidence that these designs were reproduced on cave walls, pebbles, tools, and stone monuments where they represented the corporate identify of their owners, much like military insignia do today.

Another significant aspect of the system is that descent is depicted as a fusion of the leg of an upper figure with the arm of a lower one. These common limbs represent bonds between generations. Many myths tell of human beings born from limbs – sometimes from arms or fingers, more commonly from legs, and most commonly from knees. The idea of birth from the limbs is based on an analogy with the plant world. Just as tree limbs can regenerate, so too, are human limbs seen as a source of potency. A human body becomes a living kinship chart with the ancestral spirits resident in the joints.

== Bibliography ==
=== Articles ===
1. International Studio, Vol. XCII, No. 381, February 1929, pp. 44–47. Carl Schuster writing on decoration of Japanese sword guards (decorative tsubas)
2. “Some Peasant Embroideries from Western China,” Embroidery Magazine, London, (Sept., 1935), pp. 88–89.
3. “Das Vogelmotif in der Chinesischen Bauernstickerei,” (part of his PhD thesis) in J. Strzygowski, Spuren Indogermanischen Glaubens in der bildenden Kunst, Heidelberg, 1936, pp. 326–44. An English translation of this work was published under the title, “A Bird Motif in Chinese Peasant Embroidery,” 13 pages, Peking, 1936.
4. “An Archaic Form of Chess in Chinese Peasant Embroidery.” Man (Sept. 1936), London, pp. 148–151.
5. “A Prehistoric Symbol in Modern Chinese Folk Art” Man, vol. XXXVI (270–292), (Dec. 1936), pp. 201–203.
6. “A Comparative Study of Motives in Western Chinese Folk Embroideries” Monumenta Serica, vol. 2, fasc. 1, (1936), Peking.
7. “Peasant Embroideries of China” Asia (Jan. 1937), pp. 26–31.
8. “A Comparison of Aboriginal Textile Designs in Southwest China with Peasant Designs from Eastern Europe,” Man, vol. 37, (July 1937), pp. 105–106.
9. “The Triumphant Equestrian,” Monumenta Serica, vol. II, fasc. 2 (1937), Peking, pp. 437–440.
10. “The Bird with S-Curves in Southwestern China,” Artibus Asiae, vol. IX, no. 4 (1946), pp. 321–322.
11. “Some Comparative Considerations about Western Asiatic Carpet Designs,” Artibus Asiae, vol. IX, Ascona, Switzerland, (1946), pp. 68–92.
12. “Some Artistic Parallels between Tanimbar, the Solomon Islands and Polynesia,” Cultureel Indië, vol. 8, Leiden, (1946), pp. 1–8.
13. “Prehistoric Stone Objects from New Guinea the Solomons,” Mankind, vol. III, No. 9, Sydney, Australia, (July 1946), pp. 247–251.
14. Letter to A.F.C.A. van Heyset, on Chinese-made objects from the casque of the tropical hornbill, Cultureel Indië, vol. 8, (1946), Leiden, pp. 222–224.
15. “A Perennial Puzzle: The Motive of Three Fish with a Common Head,” Art and Thought (Festschrift for Ananda K. Coomaraswamy), Luzac & Co., London, (1947), pp. 116–125.
16. “Modern Parallels for Ancient Egyptian Tattooing,” Sudan Notes and Records, vol. 29, Khartoum, (1948), pp. 71–77. "Sudan Notes and Records" (PDF).
17. “Stitch-Resist Dyed Fabrics of Western China,” Bulletin of the Needle and Bobbin Club, vol. 32, New York, (1948), pp. 10–29. "Bulletin of the Needle and Bobbin Club" (PDF). Archived from the original (PDF) on 2016-03-05.
18. “Traditional Designs Common to the Old and New Worlds,” Philadelphia Anthropological Society Bulletin, vol. 3, no. 4, (1950), pp. 2–3.
19. “An Ancient Chinese Mirror Design Reflected in Modern Melanesian Art,” The Far Eastern Quarterly, vol. 11, no. 1, (Nov. 1951), pp. 52–66.
20. “Joint Marks: A Possible Index of Cultural Contact Between America, Oceania, and the Far East.” Koninklijk Instituut Voor de Tropen, Amsterdam, 1951.
21. “Designs Incised on Pearl Shell from Northwestern Australia and Tanimbar,” Mankind, vol. IV, Sydney, (1951), pp. 219–220.
22. “A Survival of the Eurasiatic Animal Style in Modern Alaskan Eskimo Art.” Indian Tribes of Aboriginal America, edited by Sol Tax, pp. 35–45, University of Chicago Press, 1952.
23. “V-Shaped Chest Markings: Distribution of a Design Motive in and around the Pacific,” Anthropos, vol. 47, Fribourg, Switzerland (1952), pp. 99–118.
24. “Head-Hunting Symbolism on the Bronze Drums of the Ancient Dongson Culture and in the Modern Balkans,” Actes du IVe Congrès International des Sciences Anthropologiques et Ethnologiques, Vienna (1952), tome II, pp. 278–282.
25. “The Labyrinth Motive in the Old and New Worlds: Problems in the Diffusion of a Design." Communication to the 4th International Congress of Anthropological and Ethnological Sciences, Vienna, (1952). Mimeographed and distributed.
26. “An Ancient Cultural Movement Reflected by Modern Survivals in the Arts of the Carpathians, the Caucasus Region, West China, and Melanesia, Dated by the Dongson Culture of Northern Indo-China,” Actes du IVe Congrès International des Sciences Anthropologiques et Ethnologiques, Vienna (1952), tome II, p. 283.
27. “Human Figures in South American Petroglyphs and Pictographs as Excerpts from Repeating Patterns,” Anales del Museo de Historia Natural, 2nd series, vol. 4, no. 6, Montevideo, Uruguay (1955), pp. 1–13.
28. “Genealogical Patterns in the Old and New Worlds.” Revista Do Museu Paulista, Nova Série, vol. X (1956/58), São Paulo, Brazil . This article was also printed separately as a booklet under the same title.
29. “Human Figures with Spiral Limbs in Tropical America,” Miscellanea Paul Rivet, Octogenario Dicata, (Report of the 31st International Congress of Americanists); vol. II, Mexico (1958), pp. 549–561.
30. “Skin and Fur Mosaics from Early Prehistoric Times to Modern Survivals,” Actes du VIe Congrès International des Sciences Anthropologiques et Ethnologiques, Paris (1960), tome II, pp. 631–632.
31. “Some Geometric Designs of Upper Paleolithic Art Explained in Light of Survivals in Later Prehistoric Periods and Modern ‘Primitive’ Cultures,” 5th International Congress of Prehistoric and Protohistoric Science, Hamburg (1958), Berlin (1961), pp. 750-751.
32. “Observations on the Painted Designs of Patagonian Skin Robes.” Essays in Pre-Columbian Art and Archaeology, Samuel Lothrop, ed. Harvard University Press, Cambridge, Mass., 1961, pp. 421–447.
33. “Remarks on the Design of an Early Ikat Textile in Japan,” in Festschrift Alfred Bühler, Basel (1962), pp. 339–374.
34. “Skin and Fur Mosaics in Prehistoric and Modern Times,” in Festschrift für Ad. E. Jenson, Munich (1964), pp. 559–610.
35. “Speculations on the Similarity of some Notched Artifacts in the Folsom Culture and in the Old World Paleolithic." American Association for the Advancement of Science. Cleveland (1963). Mimeographed and distributed.
36. “Kapkaps with Human Figures from the Solomon Islands,” Academiae Scientiarum Hungarica: Acta Ethnographia, tome 13, fasc. 1–4, Budapest (1964), pp. 213–279.
37. “Pottery Vessels from South America in the Form of a Double-Headed Human Figures,” Folk, vol. 8/9, Copenhagen (1967), pp. 315–324.
38. “The Ainu Inao; Some Comparative Considerations,” Proceedings, VIIIth Congress of Anthropological and Ethnological Sciences, Tokyo and Kyoto, Science Council of Japan (1968), pp. 86–98.
39. “Pendants in the Form of Inverted Human Figures from Paleolithic to Modern Times." Proceedings of the 7th International Congress of Anthropological and Ethnological Sciences, (1964), pp. 105–117, Moscow.
40. “Incised Stones from Nevada and Elsewhere.” The Nevada Archaeological Survey Reporter, vol. II, no. 5 (May 1968). University of Nevada, Reno, NV.
41. “V-Shaped Chest Markings Reconsidered: A Paleolithic Figurine as Explanation for Their Wide Modern Distribution,” Anthropos, vol. 63/64, Fribourg, Switzerland (1968/1969), pp. 428–440.
42. “Relations of a Chinese Embroidery Design: Eastern Europe and Western Asia, Southeast Asia (the Dongson Culture) and Melanesia.” Early Chinese Art and its Possible Influence in the Pacific Basin, edited by Noel Barnard and Douglas Fraser, vol. II, pp. 243–290, N.Y., 1972.
43. “Comparative Observations on Some Typical Designs in Batak Manuscripts.” Catalog of Indonesian Manuscripts, Part 1 Batak Manuscripts, edited by P. Voorhoeve, pp. 52–85, The Royal Library, Copenhagen, 1975.

Some of these articles listed above can be found at: https://edmundsnowcarpenter.com/2019/09/19/carl-schuster-1904-1969/.

=== Manuscripts ===
Schuster, Carl. The Sun Bird

=== Book Reviews, Translations and Letters ===
1. Review of Karl Hentze's Objets Rituels, Croyances, et Dieux de la Chine Antique et de l’Amérique (1936). Monumenta Serica, vol. IV (1939–1940), pp. 355–359.
2. Review of Joseph Strzygowski's "Spuren indogermanischen Glaubens in der bildenden Kunst," Monumenta Serica, 2/2: 437–440, Peking.
3. Translation of K. A. Nowotny's “A Unique Wooden Figure from Ancient Mexico,” American Antiquity, vol. 15, no. 1, New York, (July 1951), pp. 57–61.
4. “Antiquity-Survival” in Artibus Asiae, vol. 18, no. 2 (1955) p. 220.
5. Letter offering material on parapegmata (peg calendars). Current Anthropology, vol. 1, nos. 5/6, 1960. .
6. Letter requesting information about Turkey-Head Targets. Journal of American Folklore, Notes and Queries, vol. 61, p. 395, Oct,-Dec., 1948. .
7. Letter requesting information about a silver brooch design among the American Indians of the Northeast based on a European model. Notes and Queries, New Series, vol. 1, no. 3, p. 172, March, 1954. Cambridge University Press. .

=== Books ===
1. Carl Schuster and Edmund Carpenter, Materials for the Study of Social Symbolism in Ancient and Tribal Art. Based on the research and writings of Carl Schuster. 3 vols, Rock Foundation, 1986–89. Privately printed. Available in print-on-demand and e-book format from Ingram/Lightning Source.
2. Carl Schuster and Edmund Carpenter, Patterns That Connect. Based on the research and writings of Carl Schuster. Abrams Press, New York, 1996.

=== See also ===
- Tichelman, G.L., "Dr. Carl Schuster on Bird-Designs in the Western Pacific: Indonesia-Melanesia-Polynesia," Cultureel Indië, 1: Leiden (1937), pp. 232–235. (Written partly by Carl Schuster.) "Bird-Designs in the Western Pacific" (PDF).
- Levi-Strauss, Claude. “Huxley Memorial Lecture: The Future of Kinship Studies.” In Proceedings of the Royal Anthropological Institute of Great Britain and Ireland. No. 1965 (1965), pp. 13–22.
- Carpenter, Edmund. “Excerpt from Karl Schuster’s Researches and Writings” in RES: Anthropology and Aesthetics, no. 6 (Autumn 1983), pp. 32–46.
- Carpenter, Edmund. “Decoding the Tribe. Carl Schuster's remarkable quest to trace humanity's ancient iconography” in Natural History Magazine, vol. 115, May, 2006, pp. 42–47. .
- Carpenter, Edmund. “Biography of Carl Schuster” in RES: Anthropology and Aesthetics, no. 24 (Autumn 1993), p. 44.
- Carpenter, Edmund. Review of "Drawing Shadows from Stones". American Anthropologist, Sept., 1998: Vol 100 Issue 3, p. 173.
- Siegeltuch, Mark. The Thread-Spirit. The Symbolism of Knotting and the Fiber Arts. Fons Vitae Press, 2010.
- Siegeltuch, Mark. Lunar Calendars or Tribal Tattoos? Alexander Marshack's ideas re-evaluated. PDF posted on Academia.edu.
- Siegeltuch, Mark. The Social Symbolism of Horns. PDF posted on Academia.edu.
- Siegeltuch, Mark. The Water Symbol. PDF posted on Academia.edu.
- Siegeltuch, Mark. Birth from the Knee. PDF posted on Academia.edu.
- Siegeltuch, Mark. The Heavenly Ladder. PDF posted on Academia.edu.
- Siegeltuch, Mark. The Continuous Line. PDF posted on Academia.edu.
- Siegeltuch, Mark. The Shameless Woman. The Origin and Meaning of an Ancient Motif. PDF posted on Academia.edu.
- Siegeltuch, Mark. Handprints and Finger Amputation. PDF posted on Academia.edu.
- Siegeltuch, Mark. Inversion: The Upside-Down World of the Dead. PDF posted on Academia.edu.
- Siegeltuch, Mark. Are Tectiforms Dwellings? PDF posted on Academia.edu.
- Siegeltuch, Mark. What is Geometric Art? PDF posted on Academia.edu.
- Siegeltuch, Mark. Labyrinths, Mazes and Related Art Forms. PDF posted on Academia.edu.
- Siegeltuch, Mark. Review of Carl Schuster's " Skin and Fur Mosaics in Prehistoric and Modern Times " An Overlooked Study that Provides an Essential Clue to the Origin and Meaning of Paleolithic Symbols. PDF posted on Academia.edu.
- Siegeltuch, Mark. The Social Origins of Mathematics. PDF posted on Academia.edu.
- Siegeltuch, Mark. Review of Patterns That Connect in Gnosis, no. 45 (Fall 1997), pp. 70–71.
- Prins, Harald. Review of Patterns That Connect in American Anthropologist, New Series, vol. 100, no. 3 (Sept. 1998).
- Liebenthal, Frank. With Carl Schuster in search of folk-art motifs in China. Szechwan Travel Diary, 1936. (July 2024).
- Baker, Muriel, and Lunt, Margaret. Blue and White. The Cotton Embroideries of Rural China. Charles Scribner and Sons, New York, 1977.
- Newspaper article about a lecture given by Schuster on Chinese folk art. Yenching News, Friday, Oct. 30, 1936. .
- Ch'i-Lu, Ch’en. “The Aboriginal Art of Taiwan and Its Implication for the Cultural History of the Pacific,” in Early Chinese Art and its possible influence in the Pacific Basin. Volume Two, Asia,” Intercultural Arts Press, New York, 1972, pp. 395-430
- Cammann, Schuyler. “Ancient Symbolism in Modern Afghanistan” in Ars Orientalia, vol. 2 (1957), p. 5-34.
- Webber, Alika Podolinsky. "Ceremonial Robes of the Montagnais-Naskapi" in American Indian Art Magazine, Winter (1982), pp. 60–77.
- Hinojosa, David Rettig. "Union Y Descendencia en Boca de Poterillos, Nuevo Leon: Elementos Graficos Transmitidos por el Hacer Rutinario," in Arte Rupestre del Noreste, edited by William Breen Murray. Fondo Editorial de Nuevo, Leon, Mexico, (2007) pp. 259–296.
- Messmer, Matthias. Jewish Wayfarers in Modern China: Tragedy and Splendor pp. 135–136. Two pages on Schuster's travels in China.
- Article on Schuster's Guggenheim grant for research in China. See also, "Art News" April 9, 1938, p. 18. .
- Description of Schuster's grant from the Wenner-Gren Foundation in 1956 for anthropological research. Wenner-Gren Foundation for Anthropological Research: Report on the Foundations Activities for Year Ended 1958, p. 41.
- Article on Schuster's research in the Solomon Islands. Pacific Islands Monthly, Vol. IX. No. 4 (Nov. 15, 1938). Click on picture above.
- Holmgren, Robert and Spertus, Anita. Early Indonesian Textiles from Three Island Cultures: Sumba, Toraja, Lampung, Metropolitan Museum of Art, p. 62.
- Dallas Museum of Art. . Indonesian textile. See "Additional Information".
- Solheim, Wilhem G., "A Look at L'Art Prebouddhique de la Chine et de l'Asie du Sud-Est et Son Influence en Oceanie Forty Years After". pp. 177–179.
- Hamell, George. "Of Hockers, Diamonds and Hourglasses. Some Interpretations of Seneca Archeological Art." Paper delivered at the Iroquois Conference at Albany New York (1979). pp. Available on Academia.edu.
- Van Heekeren, H. R. The Bronze-Iron Age of Indonesia, pp. 17, 19, 106, 114. Martinus Nijhoff Publishers (1958). .
- Barrow, Terence. Maori Wood Sculpture of New Zealand, pp. 17, 166–167. Charles Tuttle and Co. Publishers, 1970. .
- Paine, Sheila. The Afghan Amulet, pp. 261–262. Penguin Books (1995). .
- Welters, Linda (editor). Folk Dress in Europe and Anatolia, p. 147-148, 167. Oxford Publishers, New York, N.Y. (1999). .
- Truong, Alain. Sutra Covers, Ming Dynasty (1368-1644) 16th-early 17th century from the Carl Schuster Collection. .
- Giedion, Siegfried. "Hands as Magic Symbols" in Forum, p. 50, University of Houston, Fall 1962. Also in, The Eternal Present: The Beginnings of Architecture, p. 117, Bollingen Series, XXXV.6.11. Pantheon Books, New York, N.Y.
- McCullough, David W. The Unending Mystery : A Journey Through Labyrinths and Mazes, p. 150. Pantheon Books, New York, N.Y. (2004).
- Crist, Dunn-Vaturi and de Voogt. Ancient Egyptians at Play. Board Games Across Borders, p. 121, Bloomsbury Egyptology Series, Bloomsbury Publishing, London, England (2016).
- Law, Bimala Chum, ed. Acarya-Puspanjali pp. 205–211. Article by Joseph Strzygowski dealing with Chinese peasant embroidery. The Indian Research Institute, Calcutta, India. (1040).
- Records of the South Australian Museum vol. 15, no. 1, pp. 690–691, (1965).

=== Archeology Related ===
- Gramly, Richard. “Abstract Stone Sculptures of Ancestors: Examples from Prehistoric North America.” "Persimmon Press".
- Bostrom, Peter A.” Gault Site Engraved Stones.” "Lithic Casting Lab".
- Dennis C. Curry and Maureen Kavanagh. "A Carved Bone Figure". Curry, Dennis C. (May 2010). "A Carved Bone Figure". Maryland Archaeological Conservation Laboratory Curator's Choice.
- Harrod, James B. "Discovery of Portable Art Zoomorphic Sculptures from the Clovis Zone, Hiscock Site, NY". January 20, 2020. Available on Academia.edu.
- Deb Twigg. "Grid Stone Found at Spanish Hill". "Grid Stone". 16 August 2008.
- Thomas, David Hurst. "A Shoshean Prayerstone Hypothesis: Ritual Cartographies of Great Basin Incised Stones". American Antiquity 84 (1), pp. 1–25 (2019). .
- Mongolia's Arctic Connections: The Hovsgol Deer Stone Project, 2001-2002 Field Report, pp. 4–5. Arctic Studies Center, Washington, D.C.
- Ackerman, Phyllis. "The Gemini are Born". Archaeology, Spring 1955: Vol 8 Issue 1, p. 28.
- Excavations started in 1991 at the Blombos Cave site on the Southern coast of South Africa unearthed a 75,000-year-old piece of ocher engraved with hourglass figures, patterns that Schuster identified as basic units of a graphic system used to depict genealogical relations. If the dating is accurate, this would more than double the known age of this symbolism.

=== Collections ===
- Field Museum, Chicago: Schuster Chinese Textile Collection www.fieldmuseum.org/carl-schuster
- NY Public Library: Chinese Prints collected by Carl Schuster. A group of Chinese prints, including some important early Buddhist woodcuts and some 250 Chinese popular prints. "NY Public Library".
- Australian opossum skin cloak in the Smithsonian Museum "Possum Skin Cloak".

=== Schuster Archive ===
Museum der Kulturen Münsterplatz 20 Entrance: Augustinergasse 8 4051 Basel, Switzerland.
