= Alice Adams (novel) =

1921 novel by Booth Tarkington

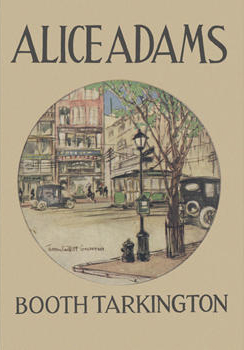
- First edition (1921)
- Author: Booth Tarkington
- Language: English
- Publisher: Doubleday, Page & Co.
- Publication date: June 1921
- Publication place: United States
- Media type: Print

Alice Adams is a 1921 novel by Booth Tarkington that received the 1922 Pulitzer Prize for Fiction. It was adapted for film in 1923 by Rowland V. Lee and more famously in 1935 by George Stevens. The narrative centers on the character of a young woman, Alice Adams, who aspires to climb the social ladder and win the affections of a wealthy young man named Arthur Russell. The story is set in a lower-middle-class household in an unnamed town in the Midwest shortly after World War I.

== Plot ==
Virgil Adams is confined to bed with an unnamed illness. There is tension between him and his wife over how he should recover, and she pressures him to not return to work for J.A. Lamb once he is well. Alice, their daughter, attempts to keep the peace, with mixed results. She walks to her friend Mildred Palmer's house to see what Mildred will wear to a dance that evening.

After returning, Alice spends the day preparing for the dance and picks violets for a bouquet because she cannot afford to buy flowers for herself. Her brother, Walter, initially refuses to accompany her to the dance, but because Alice cannot go without an escort, Mrs. Adams prevails upon Walter into renting a car to drive Alice.

Walter is disdainful of the upper class. He would rather spend his time gambling with the African-American servants in the cloakroom than be in the ballroom at the dance. Alice, to avoid looking alone, forces him to dance with her, but Walter eventually abandons her. Alice tries to give the impression that she is not standing by herself, and she then dances with Frank Dowling, whose attentions she does not welcome, and Arthur Russell, a rich newcomer. Arthur is rumored to be engaged to Mildred, and Alice believes he may have danced with her out of pity at Mildred's request. She leaves the dance horribly embarrassed after Arthur discovers Walter gambling with the servants.

The next day, Alice goes into town on an errand for her father and passes Frincke's Business College on the way. She shudders, since she sees it as a place that drags promising young ladies down to "hideous obscurity." On the walk back home, she encounters Arthur Russell, who shows interest in her. As she assumes that he is engaged, she does not know how to handle the conversation. She warns him not to believe what girls like Mildred will say about her, and she lies to obscure her family's humble economic status.

Arthur returns several days later, and his courtship of Alice continues. He mentions a dance being thrown by the young Miss Henrietta Lamb. Arthur wants to escort Alice to the dance, and she lies to cover up that she was not invited. Mrs. Adams uses Alice's distress to goad Virgil into setting up a glue factory, which she has long insisted would be the family's ticket to success. It is eventually revealed that the glue recipe was developed by Virgil and another man while employed under J.A. Lamb, who, over the years, declined to take up its production despite repeated prodding from Virgil. Although he is initially reluctant to "steal" from Lamb, Virgil finally convinces himself that his improvements to the recipe over the years have made it his.

As Arthur continues his secret courtship of Alice, she continues to lie to preserve her crafted image of herself and her family. This becomes especially difficult when she and Arthur encounter Walter in a bad part of town walking with a young woman who looks like a prostitute. At home, Walter is confronted by his father, who demands Walter quit Lamb's to help set up the glue factory. Walter refuses to help his father without a $300 cash advance, which Virgil cannot afford.

Virgil arranges to resign from Lamb's employ without speaking to him in person because he fears Lamb's reaction, and he puts the glue factory into operation. Meanwhile, Alice works frantically to convince Arthur that the things other people will say about her are not true. Arthur insists that no one has spoken about Alice behind her back and that nothing anyone says could change his opinion of her. Mrs. Adams decides to arrange a dinner so that Arthur can meet the family and sets about planning an elaborate meal and hiring servants to impress Arthur.

Walter again demands cash from his father, now $350, and he again is rebuffed. While the events occur at the Adams house, Arthur overhears shocking things about Alice and her family, including that Virgil "stole" from Lamb to set up a factory with Lamb's secret glue recipe.

The dinner is a disaster since the day is unbearably hot, the food is far too heavy, and the hired servants are surly and difficult to manage. This is capped by Virgil's unwittingly acting like his lower-middle-class self. Arthur, still reeling from what he heard about the Adams family earlier in the day, is stiff and uneasy, and Alice feels increasingly uncomfortable. By the end of the night, it is apparent to her that he will not come courting again, and she bids him farewell. That night, word reaches the family that Walter has skipped town and leaves behind him a massive debt to J.A. Lamb, which will have to be paid to keep Walter out of jail.

The following morning, Virgil arrives at work to see that Lamb is opening his own glue factory on such a huge scale that Adams will not be able to compete, and he will never make enough money to either pay his son's debts or pay off the family's mortgage.

Virgil confronts Lamb about the situation, works himself into such a state that he collapses, and returns to the same sickbed where he was at the beginning of the book. Lamb takes pity and arranges to buy the Adams glue factory for a price sufficient to pay off Walter's debts and the family's mortgage. The Adams family takes in boarders to help keep the family afloat economically, and Alice heads downtown to Frincke's Business College to train herself in employable skills to support the family. She encounters Arthur and is pleased that their conversation is both polite and brief. She accepts that there is no possibility of renewing the romance between them.

== Main characters ==
- Alice Adams – The protagonist. An ambitious and vivacious 22-year-old woman whose optimism belies her lower social status. She uses a pattern of lies and misleading signals to obscure her family's true status.
- Arthur Russell – An upper-class young man smitten with Alice, who is not entirely aware of the Adams family's status in town.
- Virgil Adams – Alice's father. A man of integrity who lacks ambition. He feels pressured to violate his loyalty to his employer by his wife's insistence on providing for their children.
- Mrs. Adams – Alice's mother. A woman who always wants more than her husband provides, who is blind to her children's faults, and is the primary goad to her husband's ill-fated venture.
- Walter Adams – Alice's brother. A young man who prefers to consort with the lower classes, and whose prodigal ways create trouble for him.
- J.A. Lamb – Virgil's boss. A generally honorable old man who runs a very successful business, and Virgil and Walter's employer.

== Adaptations ==
=== Film ===
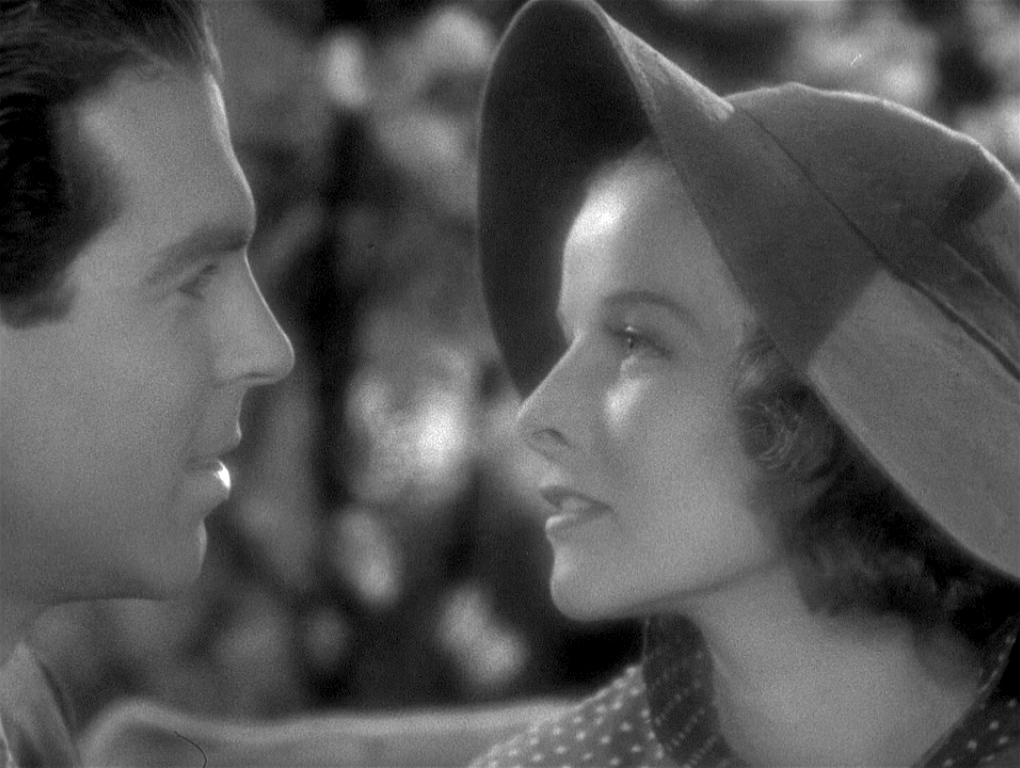
Fred MacMurray and Katharine Hepburn in Alice Adams (1935)

The plot of the 1935 film (a remake of the silent movie based on the novel, which was filmed in 1923) revolves around a social-climbing girl (Katharine Hepburn) and her mother (Ann Shoemaker); it has minor changes from the novel and a different ending. It was written by Dorothy Yost, Mortimer Offner and Jane Murfin. The film was directed by George Stevens.

The movie was nominated for the Academy Award for Best Picture .

=== Radio ===
Theatre Guild on the Air presented an adaptation of Alice Adams on November 5, 1950, with Judy Garland in the title role and Thomas Mitchell co-starring.
