= Edward Eliscu =

American dramatist (1902–1998)

- Born: April 2, 1902; Manhattan, New York City, U.S.
- Died: June 18, 1998 (aged 96); Newtown, Connecticut, U.S.
- Occupations: Lyricist; playwright; producer; stage actor

Edward Eliscu (April 2, 1902 – June 18, 1998) was an American lyricist, playwright, producer and actor, and a successful writer of songs for films.

== Life ==
Eliscu was born in Manhattan, New York City. His parents, Frank and Sofia Eliscu, were born in Romania and emigrated to the United States. He attended DeWitt Clinton High School in Manhattan as a classmate of director George Cukor. He then attended City College of New York and graduated with a Bachelor of Science degree. His older brother Millton D'Eliscu was a military officer, multi-sport coach, and athletic director.

He then began acting in Broadway plays. Eliscu's first film score was with Vincent Youmans and Billy Rose for the film Great Day. Two well-known songs from that show include "More Than You Know," and "Without a Song."

He married the dancer and journalist Stella Bloch in 1931. They both worked in the film industry until the House Committee on Un-American Activities named her husband in the 1950s. This ended his career in the film and later in the television industry. Eliscu together with his wife's cousin Mortimer Offner moved away from Hollywood and returned to New York.

Eliscu was inducted into the Songwriters Hall of Fame in 1975.

He died on June 18, 1998, aged 96, in Newtown, Connecticut.

Eliscu is the grandfather of music journalist and broadcaster Jenny Eliscu.

== Works ==
=== Selected film and theatre scores ===
- Lady Fingers
- The Street Singer
- A Little Racketeer
- Frederica (also librettist)
- Meet the People (also producer)
- The Banker's Daughter
- 9:15 Revue
- The Garrick Gaieties (1930)
- The Little Show
- Flying Down to Rio (1933)
- The Gay Senorita (1945)

=== Selected hits ===
- "Happy Because I'm in Love"
- "Ankle Up the Altar"
- "Music Makes Me"
- "Orchids in the Moonlight"
- "Meet the People"
- "A Fellow and a Girl"
- "You Forgot Your Gloves"
- "Without a Song"
- "More Than You Know"
- "I'll Still Belong To You (Eliscu and Brown song)"
- "Carioca"
- "Flying Down to Rio"
- "Great Day"

=== Selected collaborators ===
- Vincent Youmans
- Billy Rose
- Jay Gorney
- Henry Myers (composer)
- John Green
- Gus Kahn
- Vernon Duke
- Manning Sherwin
- Richard Myers
- Ned Lehac
- Billy Hill
- Nacio Herb Brown (songwriter)
