= Arthur Probsthain =

Bookstore in London, England

Coordinates: 51.5178°N 0.1268°W

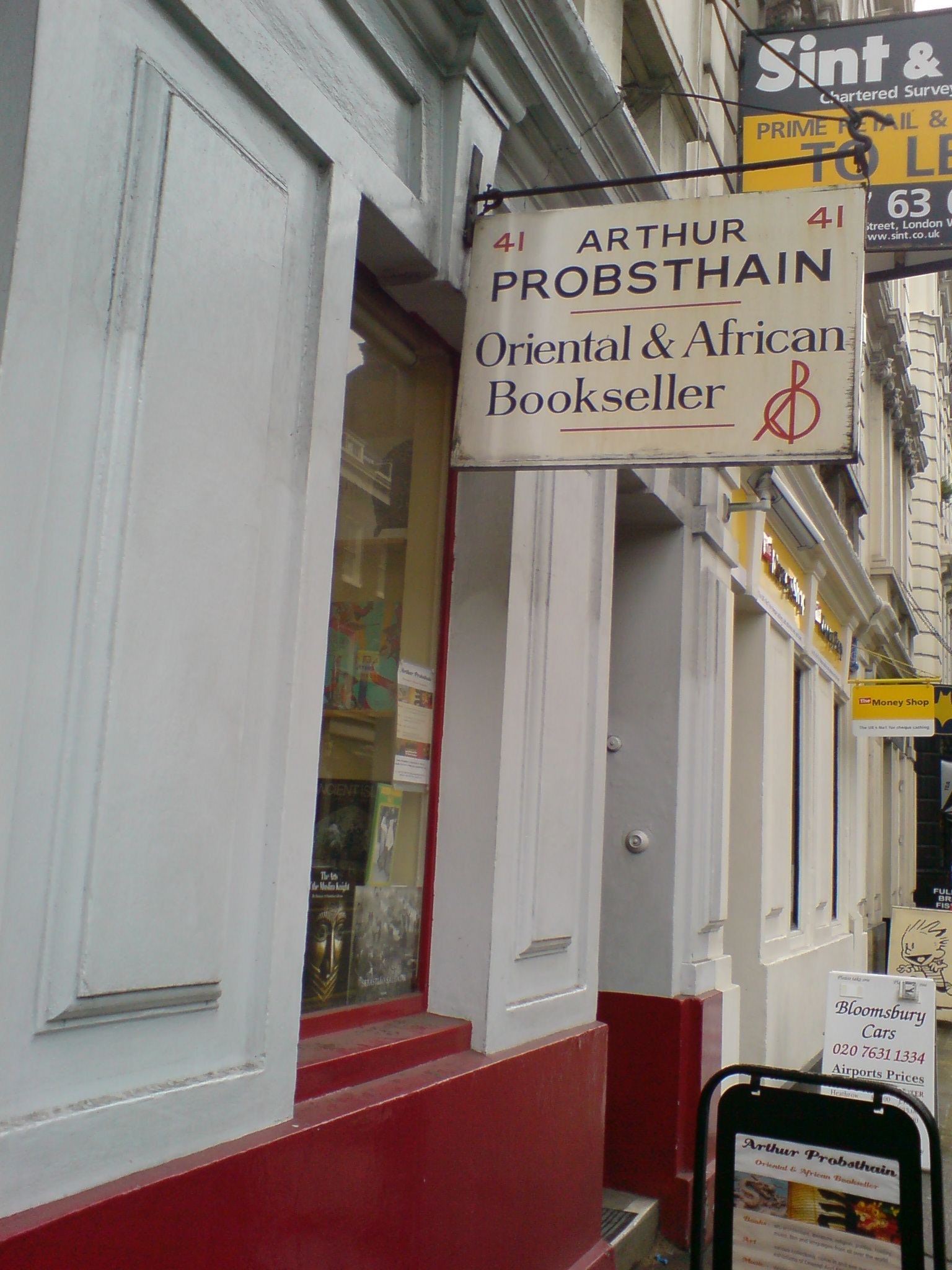
- Industry: Specialty retail
- Founded: 1903
- Founder: Arthur Probsthain
- Headquarters: London, United Kingdom
- Number of locations: 2 stores
- Area served: London
- Products: New, used and rare books
- Website: https://www.teaandtattle.com/bookshop

Arthur Probsthain is an independent bookstore based in London, specialising in antique Asian and African books.

== History ==
The bookstore was started in 1903 by Arthur Probsthain at Bury Place, and now bears his name. It has been located at 41 Great Russell Street, opposite the British Museum, since 1905.

The bookstore has been family owned for nearly a century. Arthur Probsthain's nephew Walter Sheringham joined him in the business and inherited it on Probsthain's death in 1941. Sheringham married Eve, and their two sons Michael and Lesley joined the business in the 1970s. As of 2003 Lesley's two sons Tim and Christopher (Arthur Probsthain's great-great-nephews) were involved in the business. There is now also a tearoom, "Tea and Tattle", sharing the premises.

The bookstore claims to be one of the oldest Asian bookstore in London after Bernard Quaritch.

== Collection ==
The bookstore has some 150,000 books. Notable items in its collection include a handwritten Quran.

The store featured in the 1991 novel The Feather Men by Ranulph Fiennes.
