= Stella Bloch =

American artist, dancer and journalist

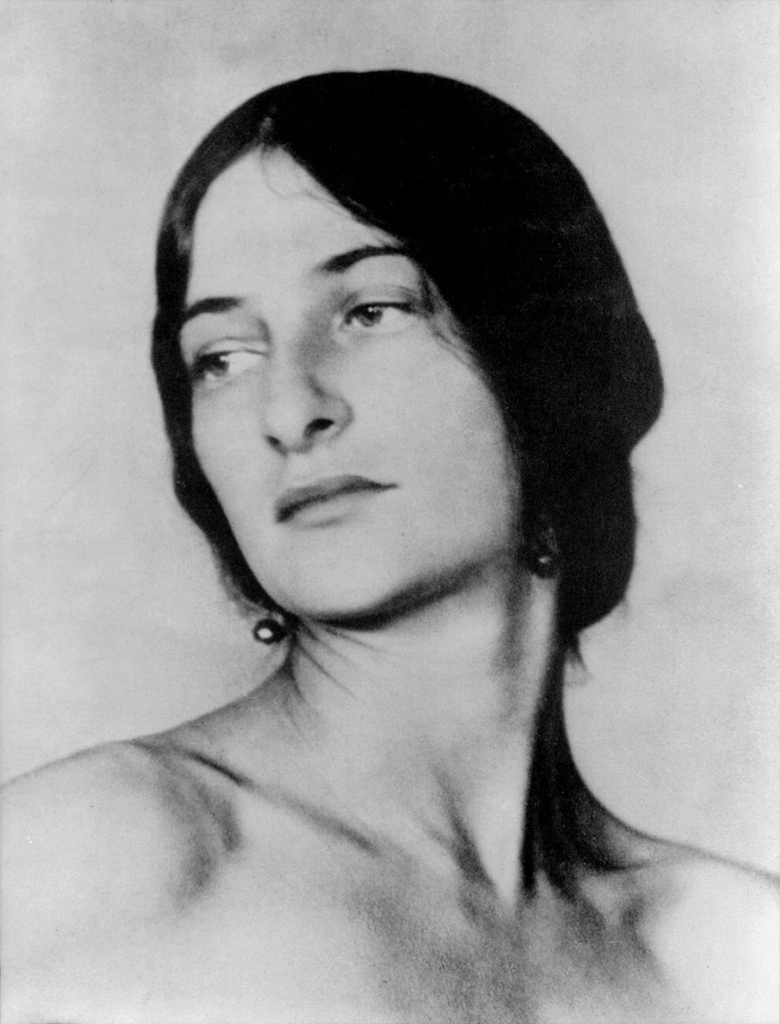
- Bloch in 1919 or 1920
- Born: December 18, 1897; Tarnau, Austria-Hungary (now Tarnów, Poland)
- Died: January 20, 1999 (aged 101); Bethel, Connecticut, U.S.
- Other names: Stella Coomaraswamy
- Spouses: Ananda Coomaraswamy; Edward Eliscu
- Children: 2 sons

Stella Bloch (December 18, 1897 – January 20, 1999) was an American artist, dancer and journalist. She headlined as a dancer in Rochester, New York. She also worked as an artist and her work is in several collections.

== Life ==
Bloch was born in Tarnau, Galicia & Lodomeria, Austria-Hungary (now Tarnów, Poland) because her mother, Charlotte, had returned from New York City to give birth on December 18, 1897. Her family was Jewish. Stella was brought up on East 54th Street in Manhattan with her mother; her aunt and uncle (Pauline and Bernard Offner), and her cousins, Richard and Mortimer Offner (both of whom died in 1965).

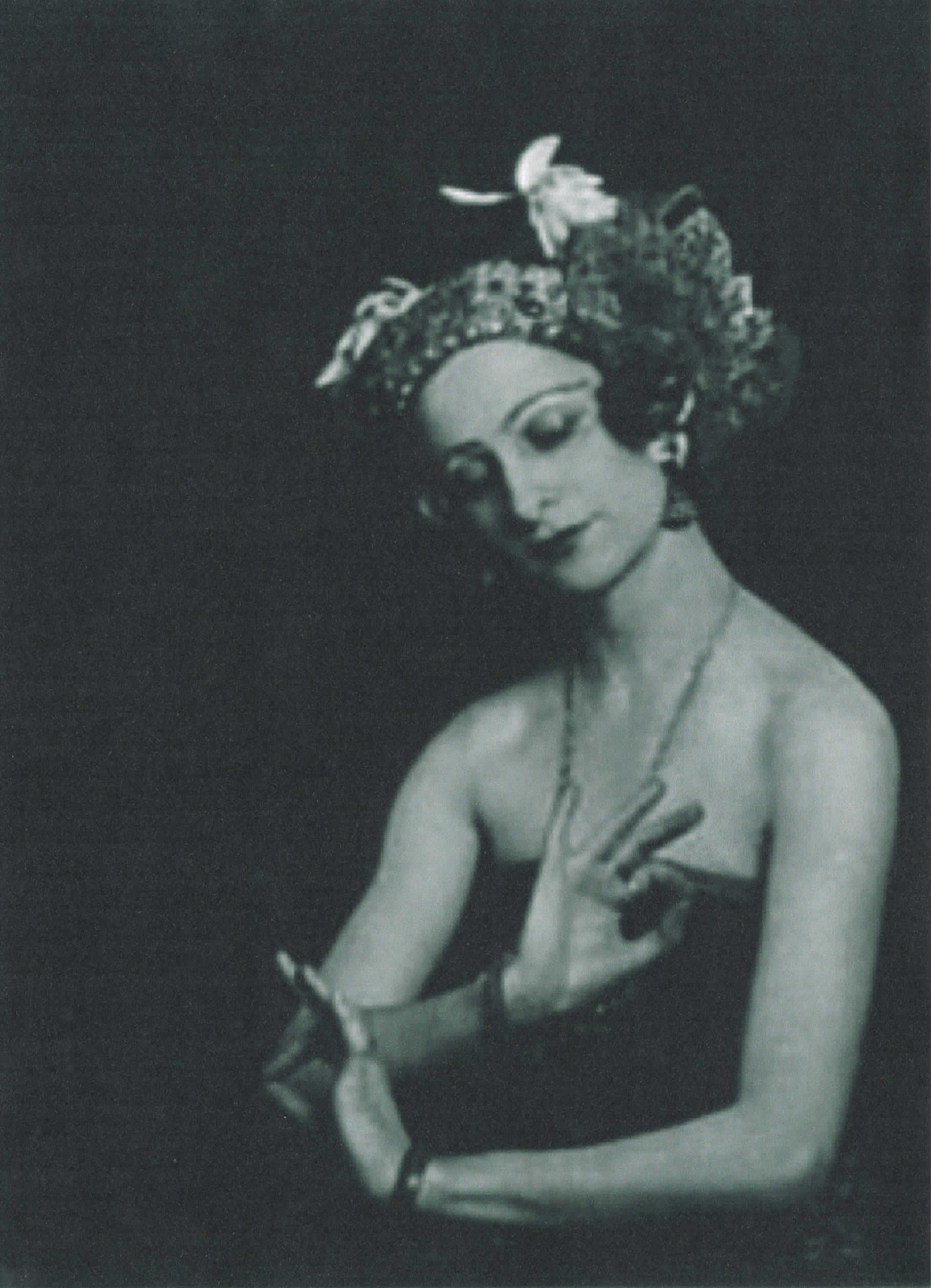
Bloch in costume

Bloch was said to have been the first student in America of Isadora Duncan's six dancers who were known as the Isadorables. She met Ananda Coomaraswamy who took her to India at the age of 17. She spent some time in India. She spent a year learning Javanese dancing at the palace of the Prince of Solo in Surakarta in Java. Bloch also started using her journalist and artistic skills by sketching the dancers at the Art Students League in New York.

Bloch demonstrated her dancing in America. She was at the top of the bill at the Eastman Theatre in Rochester, New York. Bloch became Coomaraswamy's third wife in 1922. The same year she published Dancing and the Drama East and West which included some of her drawings and an introduction by her husband.

The book was able to compare the different dance heritages of eastern as well as western cultures because she had studied them whilst touring not only Java but also India, Bali, Cambodia, China and Japan. During the 1920s she sketched and painted scenes as part of the Harlem Renaissance which also included portraits of Bessie Smith, Josephine Baker and Thelonious Monk.

In 1930, she and her first husband, Ananda Coomaraswamy, divorced. She had been based in New York and he was working at the Boston Museum of Art so they had not been living in the same city. Bloch moved to Hollywood after she married the lyricist Edward Eliscu in 1931. He was a successful writer of songs for films. Bloch was still dancing and visiting venues like the Cotton Club. She learned the Charleston from Elida Webb and her performances were well received. She had exhibited her artwork in New York and she now had exhibitions in California. They both worked in the film industry until the House Committee on Un-American Activities named her husband. This ended his career in the film and later in the television industry. Her cousin, Mortimer Offner, was also named. Mortimer had written Little Tough Guys in Society. Katharine Hepburn and George Cukor were collectors of Bloch's work.

After her husband was blacklisted, he, Mortimer, and others returned to New York.

She had two sons, David and Peter. Whilst she was living in Connecticut she wrote a play about Isadora Duncan but it is not known if and where it was performed. Bloch's artwork was used in 1989 when she created the logo for the Broadway production of the Black and Blue musical.

Her husband died in 1998. Stella Bloch died in Bethel, Connecticut, on January 20, 1999, aged 101.

== Legacy ==
There are drawings and photographs of Bloch and drawings by her at Harvard. Lincoln Center and the Schomburg Center and the Museum of Fine Arts in Boston that were given by her first husband, Ananda Coomaraswamy, in 1932. The New York Public Library and the Harvard Theatre Collection have extensive collections of her papers.
