= Mortimer Offner =

American screenwriter

- Born: November 3, 1900; New York City, New York, U.S.
- Died: September 1965 (aged 64); New York

Mortimer Offner (November 3, 1900 – September 1965) was an American photographer, political activist, and screenwriter. He created portraits of leading film stars before successfully moving to screenwriting. His career ended when he was blacklisted because he was a communist.

== Life ==
Offner was born in New York City on November 3, 1900. His parents were of Austrian Jewish descent and they ran a dressmaking business and lived with Mortimer's aunt on East 54th street. The household also included his brother, Richard, and his cousin, dancer, and artist Stella Bloch. Offner had a university education before he attended the Clarence White School of Photography. After trying acting, he became a photographer taking portraits on Broadway. Offner and his brother are credited with helping their cousin in launching her career.

Offner's career was transformed when he was encouraged to move to Hollywood by actress Katharine Hepburn in 1932. While there, he discovered that he had a talent for screenwriting, and his photography ended in 1934.

Offner notably worked on Alice Adams. Dorothy Yost and Jane Murfin had created a script, but the director George Stevens was annoyed that the writers had changed the ending. Stevens' friend, Offner, was called in, and they and Hepburn rewrote it, writing and performing the lines as they wrote. The script was only completed twelve days before the end of the shooting schedule.

His films were frequently adaptations of novels. He wrote ten screenplays for films. Offner was an activist for the Communist Party and this resulted in him losing work. Like many, including his cousin's husband Edward Eliscu, Mortimer moved away from Hollywood and returned to New York.

At the end of his career he had to work under a pseudonym.

== Death ==
Offner died in New York City in September 1965. He was survived by two daughters, Elizabeth Offner (1948–1985) and Deborah Offner.
