= Alice Adams (1935 film) =

1935 film by George Stevens

- Theatrical release poster
- Directed by: George Stevens
- Screenplay by: Dorothy Yost; Mortimer Offner; Jane Murfin
- Based on: Alice Adams; 1921 novel by Booth Tarkington
- Produced by: Pandro S. Berman
- Starring: Katharine Hepburn; Fred MacMurray; Fred Stone; Evelyn Venable
- Cinematography: Robert De Grasse
- Edited by: Jane Loring
- Music by: Max Steiner; Roy Webb
- Production company: RKO Radio Pictures
- Distributed by: RKO Radio Pictures
- Release date: August 15, 1935
- Running time: 99 minutes
- Country: United States
- Language: English
- Budget: $342,000
- Box office: $770,000

Alice Adams is a 1935 romantic drama film directed by George Stevens and starring Katharine Hepburn. It was made by RKO and produced by Pandro S. Berman. The screenplay was by Dorothy Yost, Mortimer Offner, and Jane Murfin. The film was adapted from the novel Alice Adams by Booth Tarkington. The music score was by Max Steiner and Roy Webb, and the cinematography by Robert De Grasse. The film received Academy Award nominations for Best Picture and Best Actress.

The film is about a young woman in a financially-struggling family and her pretentious attempts to appear upper class and to wed a wealthy man while she conceals her poverty. Hepburn's popularity had declined after her two 1933 film triumphs: her Oscar-winning performance in Morning Glory and her celebrated performance as Jo March in Little Women. Her performance in Alice Adams made her a public favorite again.

== Plot ==
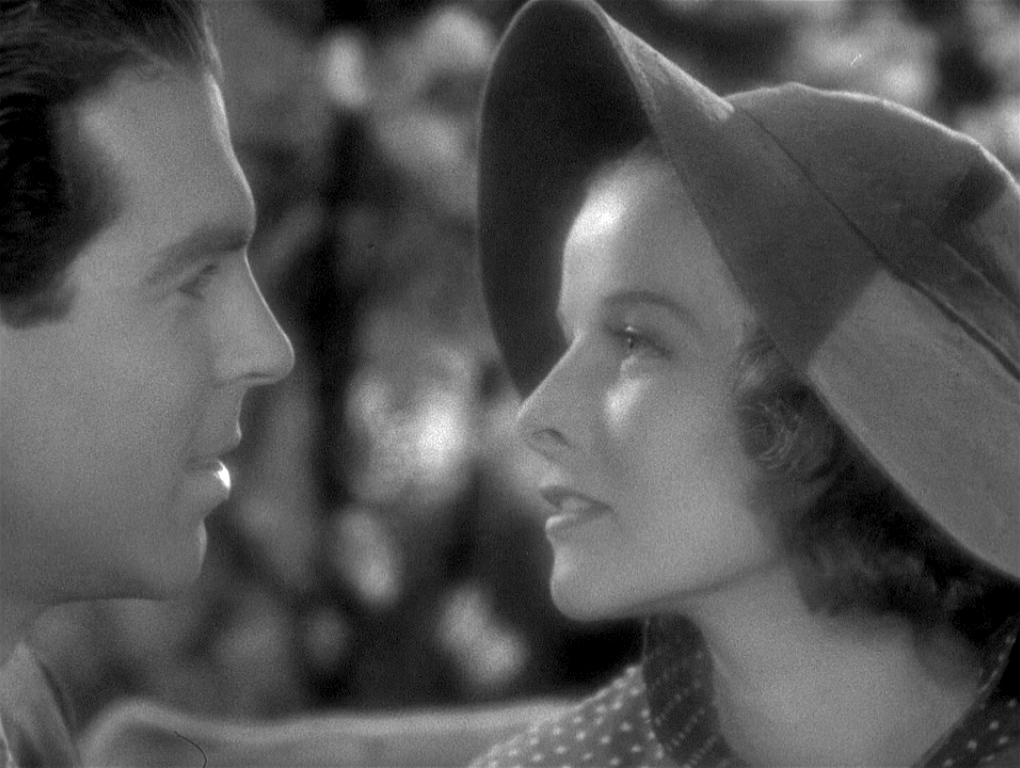
Fred MacMurray and Katharine Hepburn in Alice Adams

In the mid-1930s, Alice Adams is the daughter of the Adams family. Her father is an invalid employed as a clerk in a factory owned by Mr. Lamb, who has kept Adams on salary for years despite his lengthy illness. Her mother is embittered by her husband's lack of ambition and upset by the snubs endured by her daughter because of their poverty. Alice's older brother Walter is a gambler who cannot hold a job.

Alice attends a dance given by the wealthy Mildred Palmer. She has no date, and she is escorted to the occasion by Walter. Alice, a social climber like her mother, engages in socially-inappropriate behavior and conversation in an attempt to impress others. At the dance, Alice meets wealthy Arthur Russell, who is charmed by her despite her poverty.

Alice's mother nags her husband into quitting his job and pouring his life savings into a glue factory. Mr. Lamb ostracizes Mr. Adams from society in the belief that Adams stole the glue formula from him. Alice is the subject of cruel town gossip, which Russell ignores.

Alice invites Russell to the Adams home for a fancy meal. She and her mother put on airs, the entire family dresses inappropriately in formal wear despite the hot summer night, and the Adamses pretend that they eat caviar and fancy rich-tasting food all the time. The dinner is ruined by Alice's inability to keep up the lie, but she blames the situation on the supposed slovenly behavior and poor cooking skills of Malena, the maid hired by the Adamses for the occasion. Mr. Adams unwittingly embarrasses Alice by exposing the many lies she has told Russell. When Walter shows up with bad financial news, Alice gently expels Russell from the house now that everything is "ruined."

Walter claims that "a friend of mine got in a jam," and to help his friend, Walter has stolen $150 from Mr. Lamb. (The obvious implication is that Walter stole the money to pay off his own gambling debts.) Mr. Adams decides to take a loan against his new factory to save Walter from jail.

Just then, Mr. Lamb appears at the Adams house, accuses Adams of stealing the glue formula from him, and declares his intention to ruin Adams by building a glue factory directly across the street from the Adams plant. The men argue violently, but their friendship is saved when Alice confesses that her parents took the glue formula only so that she could have a better life and some social status. Lamb and Adams reconcile, and Lamb indicates that he will not prosecute Walter.

Alice wanders onto the porch, where Russell has been waiting for her. He confesses his love for her despite her poverty and family problems.

== Cast ==
- Katharine Hepburn as Alice Adams
- Fred MacMurray as Arthur Russell
- Fred Stone as Virgil Adams
- Evelyn Venable as Mildred Palmer
- Frank Albertson as Walter Adams
- Ann Shoemaker as Mrs. Adams
- Charles Grapewin as Mr. Lamb
- Grady Sutton as Frank Dowling
- Hedda Hopper as Mrs. Palmer
- Hattie McDaniel as Malena (spelled McDaniels in the cast listing)
- Jonathan Hale as Mr. Palmer
- Janet McLeod as Henrietta Lamb
- Virginia Howell as Mrs. Dowling
- Zeffie Tilbury as Mrs. Dresser
- Ella McKenzie as Ella Dowling

== Academy Award nominations ==
The film was nominated for the Oscar for Best Picture, and Hepburn for Best Actress. Although Bette Davis won the award for her performance in Dangerous, she said that Hepburn deserved the award, and Hepburn received the second highest number of votes.

== Production ==
The 1935 film of Alice Adams is the second adaptation of the Tarkington novel. A silent film version had been made in 1923, directed by Rowland V. Lee.

Katharine Hepburn wanted George Cukor to direct the film, but Cukor was engaged in directing David Copperfield. Cukor advised her to choose William Wyler or George Stevens as director. Although Hepburn favored the German-born and Swiss-educated Wyler, the producer Pandro S. Berman favored the American George Stevens.

The plot of the film differs from the book Alice Adams in significant ways. Most importantly, the novel depicts Alice as permanently estranged from Russell. The original script by Dorothy Yost and Jane Murfin ended with Alice and Russell in love, but Stevens was so unhappy with the script and the ending that he, his friend Mortimer Offner, and Hepburn discarded most of it and rewrote it by using dialogue taken from the novel. Their script ended with Alice's relationship with Russell up in the air, and it finished with a scene in which Alice goes to secretarial school.

However, Berman and RKO executives wanted a happy ending in which Alice gets Russell. Stevens and Hepburn opposed the change. Berman enlisted the aid of Cukor, who agreed that the more realistic ending would be box-office poison and so the script was changed into allowing Russell to fall in love with Alice and to win her over.

== Reception ==
After the cinema circuits deducted their exhibition percentage of box office ticket sales, the film made a profit of $164,000.

== Critical reviews ==
In a retrospective review, Pauline Kael deemed the film "a classic" and stated that "Hepburn gives one of her two or three finest performances".
