= Anna Wolek =

- One Life to Live character
- Doris Belack as Anna Wolek
- Portrayed by: Doris Belack (1968–77); Kathleen Maguire (1977–78); Phyllis Behar (1978–82)
- Duration: 1968–82
- First appearance: July 15, 1968
- Last appearance: December 1982
- Created by: Agnes Nixon
- Introduced by: Doris Quinlan
In-universe information
- Other names: Anna Wolek Craig
- Occupation: Housewife
- Family: Wolek
- Brothers: Vince Wolek; Larry Wolek
- Spouse: Jim Craig (1970–81)
- Adoptive daughters: Cathy Craig
- Nephews: Daniel Wolek

Anna Wolek is a fictional character on the American soap opera One Life to Live. Actress Doris Belack played the character from the show's first episode in 1968 until 1977. After Belack left the show, Kathleen Maguire played the character from 1977 until 1978. Phyllis Behar last played the role from 1978 until the character's final appearance in 1982.

== Casting ==
The role of Anna was originally cast by series creator and head writer Agnes Nixon to Broadway actress Doris Belack for the series pilot that aired July 15, 1968. Belack was an American of Eastern European Jewish descent like the Polish American character she played, and appeared in the role until 1977 and then she left to pursue acting roles outside of daytime television. Executive producer and Nixon protege Gordon Russell temporarily recast the role to recognized stage and theatre actress Kathleen Maguire in 1977. Former show scriptwriter Phyllis Behar recast herself to play the role in 1978, and played "Anna" until 1982.

== Character background and storyline ==
Anna (Belack) was introduced in the One Life to Live series debut in July 1968 as a homemaker and hospital volunteer, and matriarchal figure as the elder sibling to brothers Vince Wolek (Antony Ponzini) and Larry Wolek (Paul Tulley, Michael Storm after 1969). She lives in a tenement apartment complex in working-class west Llanview, living in a corridor directly opposite the Lord family housekeeper Sadie Gray (Lillian Hayman).

In her work as a hospital volunteer, Anna works alongside and shadows brother and Llanview Hospital resident physician Larry and befriends Meredith Lord (Trish Van Devere, Lynn Benesch after 1969). Larry works under Llanview Hospital chief of staff Jim Craig (Robert Milli, Nat Polen after 1969), to whom Anna grows an affinity. The two begin dating in 1969, and marry onscreen on April 10, 1970. Leading up to the nuptials and more obviously afterward, Anna clashes with Jim's rebellious teen daughter Cathy Craig (originally Catherine Burns, notably Dorrie Kavanaugh). Cathy begins abusing drugs, and eventually Jim and Anna persuade her to enter rehab at the real-life Odyssey House in New York City.

By the mid-1970s, the role of Anna in the series was reduced to a supporting role. She (Phyllis Behar) leaves fictional Llanview in 1982 to live in Florida, after husband Jim (and Polen) dies off-screen in 1981, and her brother and police officer Vince (Michael Ingram) is shot and killed in the line of duty.

== Impact ==
The supporting role of Anna appears on the first 14 years of the series, alongside long-running original front-burner characters Larry Wolek, Joe Riley (Lee Patterson), Carla Gray (Ellen Holly), and Victoria Lord (Erika Slezak after 1971). Belack's Anna played a central role in the Carla Gray interracial romance storyline between Holly's Carla and Llanview Hospital doctors Jim Craig and Price Trainor (Peter DeAnda).
