= Riley family =

Fictional characters on One Life to Live

- One Life to Live family
- Siblings Eileen Riley Siegel (Alice Hirson) and Joe Riley (Lee Patterson) in 1972
- First appearance: July 15, 1968
- Last appearance: August 24, 2011
- Created by: Agnes Nixon
- Introduced by: Doris Quinlan
- Duration: 1968–2001, 2003–07, 2009–11

The Riley family are fictional characters on the American soap opera One Life to Live present at its debut in 1968. The Irish Catholic American clan is formed around the relationships and descendants of protagonist Joseph "Joe" Riley.

They are initially showcased as a working class contrast to the affluent Lords, with members appearing from the debut episode on July 15, 1968 until August 24, 2011. Joe Riley's two sons, Kevin Lord Riley and Joe Riley Jr., represent their paternal family for most of the series and are adopted into the Buchanan family upon the marriage of Joe's widow Victoria Lord Riley to Clint Buchanan in 1982.

== Generations ==
Joe Riley's family in 2007 (L-R): son Joey Riley Buchanan (Nathan Fillion), widow Victoria Lord (Erika Slezak), and son Kevin Riley Buchanan (Dan Gauthier)

=== First generation ===
- Eileen Riley (Patricia Roe, Alice Hirson)
  Original character. Born off-screen late 1920s to unnamed parents as of 1968.
- Joseph Francis "Joe" Riley Sr. (Lee Patterson)
  Original character. Born off-screen 1938 as of 1968; dies onscreen October 3, 1979. Identical twin of Tom Dennison.
- Thomas "Tom" Dennison (Lee Patterson)
  Born off-screen 1938 as of 1986. Identical twin of Joe Riley Sr.

=== Second generation ===
- Timothy "Tim" Siegel (Bill Fowler, William Cox, Tom Berenger)
  Born off-screen 1950 to Eileen Riley Siegel and Dave Siegel as of 1975; dies onscreen April 6, 1976. Fraternal twin of Julie Siegel.
- Julie Siegel (Lee Warwick, Leonie Norton)
  Born off-screen 1950 to Eileen Riley Siegel and Dave Siegel as of 1975. Fraternal twin of Tim Siegel.
- Mari Lynn Dennison (Tammy Amerson)
  Born off-screen 1969 to Tom Dennison and Carol Harper Dennison as of 1986.
- Megan Craig Riley (child actors)
  Born onscreen December 2, 1974, to Joe Riley Sr. and Cathy Craig; dies onscreen October 3, 1975.
- Kevin Lord Riley Buchanan (né Kevin Lord Riley) (Kevin Stapleton, Timothy Gibbs, Dan Gauthier, and others)
  Born onscreen September 12, 1976, to Joe Riley Sr. and Victoria Lord Riley, adopted by Clint Buchanan; birth year changed to 1970 as of 1996 then 1965 as of 2005.
- Joseph Francis "Joey" Riley Buchanan (né Joseph Francis Riley Jr.) (Nathan Fillion, Don Jeffcoat, Bruce Michael Hall, Tom Degnan, and others)
  Born onscreen January 8, 1980, to Joe Riley Sr. Victoria Lord Riley, adopted by Clint Buchanan; birth year changed to 1976 in 1992,1974 as of 2010.

=== Third generation ===
- Demerest "Duke" Buchanan (Matthew Metzger and child actors)
  Born onscreen June 29, 1992, to Kevin Buchanan and LeeAnn Demerest Buchanan; birth year changed to 1986 as of 2004, dies onscreen May 12, 2006.

=== Fourth generation ===
- Zane Buchanan (child actors)
  Born onscreen October 31, 2006, to Duke Buchanan and Kelly Cramer.

== Introduction ==
At the inception of One Life to Live appears journalist Joe Riley, managing editor of the Lord family-owned The Banner newspaper of fictional Philadelphia Main Line suburb Llanview, Pennsylvania. A working-class Irish American, early storylines focus on his budding relationship with Banner executive assistant and heiress Victoria "Viki" Lord and her first bout with multiple personalities. Concurrently introduced at the show's origin is the family of Joe's sister, Eileen Riley Siegel.

Joe and Viki marry in June 1969, a marriage ended at Viki's declaration of his legal death in 1970. He reappears in 1972 as Viki marries Steve Burke. Viki continues with the marriage to Steve, but it eventually falls apart with her continued infatuation with Joe. Viki divorces Steve and remarries Joe in 1974. Eileen leaves Llanview for Florida in 1976, and soon thereafter Viki bears Joe his first son, Kevin Lord Riley. Joe dies in 1979, leaving a pregnant Viki widowed with their second child and his namesake son, Joseph Riley Jr., born in 1980.

== Family tree ==
Riley family tree

Dave Siegel
Tim Siegel

Eileen Riley
Julie Siegel

Cathy Craig	Joe Riley	Victoria Lord	Tom Dennison	Carol Harper
Megan Craig Riley	Kelly Cramer	Kevin Riley Buchanan	LeeAnn Demerest	Joey Riley Buchanan	Mari Lynn Dennison
Kevin Buchanan, Jr.	Duke Buchanan
Zane Buchanan

=== Descendants ===
Descendants

Unknown Riley (deceased)
 m. Unknown (deceased)
  c. Eileen Riley (born late 1920s)
   m. Dave Siegel [widowed; 1972]
    c. Tim Siegel (born 1950; died 1976) [twin]
     m. Jenny Wolek [1976; dissolved]
    c. Julie Siegel (born 1950)
     m. Mark Toland [1972-1975; dissolved]
  c. Joe Riley (born 1938; died 1979) [twin]
   a. Cathy Craig
    c. Megan Craig Riley (born 1974; died 1975)
   m. Victoria Lord [1969-1970, 1974-1979; dissolved]
    c. Kevin Lord Riley Buchanan (born 1976)
     m. LeeAnn Demerest [1992-1993; divorced] 
      c. Demerest "Duke" Buchanan (born 1992; died 2006)
       a. Kelly Cramer
        c. Zane Buchanan (born 2006)
     m. Cassie Callison [1998-1999; divorced]
     m. Kelly Cramer [2002-2004; divorced]
      c. Kevin Buchanan, Jr. (born 2004; stillborn)
    c. Joey Riley Buchanan (born 1980)
     m. Kelly Cramer [2000; divorced]
     m. Jennifer Rappaport [2003-2004; divorced]
      c. Unnamed child (miscarriage; 2003)
     m. Aubrey Wentworth [2011; divorced]
  c. Tom Dennison (born 1938) [twin]
   m. Carol Harper [legally dissolved 1988]
    c. Mari Lynn Dennison (born 1969)
     m. Wade Coleman [1988-; married]

== See also ==
- List of One Life to Live characters
