= Mark Toland =

- One Life to Live character
- Portrayed by: Tommy Lee Jones
- Duration: 1971–75
- First appearance: February 1971
- Last appearance: May 1975
- Created by: Agnes Nixon
- Introduced by: Doris Quinlan
In-universe information
- Occupation: Physician
- Spouse: Julie Siegel (1971–75)

Mark Toland is a fictional character from the American soap opera One Life to Live. He was portrayed by Tommy Lee Jones (credited as "Tom Lee Jones") from February 1971 until the character's onscreen death in 1975.

== Character background ==
A young and up-and-coming doctor, Mark is first shown as a suave and gregarious bachelor with great prospects. Upon informing show producers he would permanently vacate the role in 1975, Jones said in a 1994 interview to Entertainment Weekly that Mark morphed into "an A-one nutboy", becoming a con artist and sidekick to Llanview town pariah Dorian Lord (Nancy Pinkerton).

== Storyline ==
=== 1971–74 ===
Mark (Jones) and Julie (Warrick) marry, 1971.

After a nervous breakdown following a devastating breakup, the sororal niece of protagonist Joe Riley (Lee Patterson), Julie Siegel (Lee Warrick), meets Llanview newbie resident physician Dr. Mark Toland of Texas in February 1971. Mark and Julie soon marry months later on May 5, but their marriage is soon strained as an emotionally unreceptive Julie rebuffs her husband's sexual advances.

Mark and Julie seek couples therapy in 1972 with no avail in the bedroom. By May 1973, Dr. Toland begins to seek romantic solace in newly arrived Dr. Dorian Cramer (Nancy Pinkerton). Her emotionally unstable sister Melinda (Pat Pearcy), jealous of Mark and Dorian's affair, sought everything she could to break the two apart, eventually stabbing Mark's hand and leading Dorian to institutionalize her sister in 1974.

In 1974, while romancing one another in the workplace at Llanview Hospital, Dorian and Mark engage in a tense argument which leads Dorian to erroneously mark the chart of a terminally ill patient and beloved friend to Dr. Larry Wolek (Michael Storm), Rachel Wilson (Nancy Barrett). The mistake causes Mark to prescribe an overdosage of Rachel's medicine, leading to her desired death. Suspicion is soon cast on Larry, who is arrested for Rachel's suspected mercy killing, no one aware of Dorian and Mark's involvement. Both Mark and Dorian agreed to keep quiet on their complicity in the patient death.

=== 1974–75 ===
Wrought with grief and guilt, Dorian advises Mark of her decision to inform hospital chief-of-staff Dr. Jim Craig (Nat Polen) of her complicity in Rachel's death. The news frightens Mark who, afraid of criminal manslaughter charges and revocation of his medical license, attempts to flee as Dorian chases him down a flight of stairs. Dorian clumsily tumbles down behind Mark, leading to a concussion which causes her to fall into a brief coma. Determined, Mark continues on his way and escapes to South America. Eventually, Dorian emerges from her coma and testifies to the police, exonerating Larry but resulting in her being charged with medical malpractice by the Llanview Hospital board of directors. Dorian is suspended by a near unanimous vote in December 1974, save for board member Victoria "Viki" Lord Riley (Erika Slezak), whom Dorian mistakenly assumes was the deciding vote—and on whom she swears revenge.

Mark continues on his getaway to San Francisco while a jobless Dorian in Llanview goes about courting ailing Llanview media magnate and Viki's father Victor Lord (Shepperd Strudwick), in part to spite Viki for the termination she believed the media heiress caused. After moving into the Llanfair, Dorian uncovers news that the newly arrived Tony Harris (George Reinholt) was Victor's long-lost son and desired male heir. Concurrently, Mark incidentally meets Viki's maternal aunt Dorothy Randolph, who divulges that her son Tony Harris is Victor's first-born child.

Mark plans a return to Llanview to blackmail Victor for information on his long-sought male heir, but is shot dead in May 1975 by a jilted woman who mistakes him to be her cheating husband, leaving Julie (Leonie Norton) widowed.

== Reception ==
The pairing of Mark and Julie and subsequent storyline of marriage difficulty and infidelity gained such a regular following among viewers and critics it led producers to make Jones a featured lead on the series opposite Lee Patterson (Joe Riley), Michael Storm (Larry Wolek), and Erika Slezak (Victoria Lord).
