= Tony Lord (One Life to Live) =

- One Life to Live character
- George Reinholt as Tony Lord
- Portrayed by: George Reinholt (1975–1977); Philip MacHale (1977–1979, 1987); Chip Lucia (1981–1983)
- Duration: 1975–1979; 1981–1983; 1987
- First appearance: April 1975
- Last appearance: April 1987
- Created by: Agnes Nixon and Gordon Russell
- Introduced by: Doris Quinlan (1975); Joseph Stuart (1981); Paul Rauch (1987)
In-universe information
- Other names: Tony Harris
- Occupation: Businessman; Journalist
- Family: Lord
- Father: Victor Lord
- Mother: Dorothy Randolph
- Half-brothers: Todd Manning; Victor Lord, Jr.
- Half-sisters: Victoria Lord; Meredith Lord; Tina Lord
- Spouse: Cathy Craig (1976–1977); Patricia Ashley (1982–1983)
- Sons: Brian Kendall
- Aunts and uncles: Powell Lord I; Gwendolyn Lord Abbott; Eugenia Randolph Lord
- Nieces and nephews: Megan Gordon; Daniel Wolek; Kevin Buchanan; Joey Buchanan; Jessica Buchanan; Natalie Buchanan; C. J. Roberts; Sarah Roberts; Starr Manning; Danielle Manning; Jack Manning; Sam Manning
- First cousins: Clayton-Powell Lord II; Richard Abbott; Powell Lord III (once removed)

Tony Lord is a fictional character from the American soap opera One Life to Live. The elder child of Victor Lord and brother to heroine Victoria Lord, actor George Reinholt originated the role in April 1975. The character was featured continually through 1979, from 1981 to 1983, and last appeared in episodes in 1987.

== Casting and impact ==
George Reinholt transitioned from his popular leading role as Steve Frame on NBC's Another World to the newly created role of "Tony" on ABC's One Life to Live in 1975. Reinholt's move was spurred after the actor voiced his displeasure with scripts on AW and he posed for a nude centerfold, prompting NBC to fire the actor on the expressed grounds of breaching a contractual morals clause.

Regarded as a preeminent soap opera star of the 1970s, Reinholt's move to ABC was considered a major get for the show garnered by One Life's consulting producer, creator, and former AW head writer Agnes Nixon.

Reinholt debuted on OLTL amid fanfare in April 1975. He was soon joined by fired fellow AW actor and off-and-onscreen girlfriend Jacqueline "Jacquie" Courtney, who played Alice Matthews on the NBC series and created the role of OLTL's Pat Ashley. Reinholt eventually left the series in 1977 after his soap opera repairing with Courtney failed to match the popular acclaim of their prior onscreen romance.

Philip MacHale was recast to the role in June 1977, and both MacHale and the role departed fictional Llanview in 1979. The role of Tony reappeared on the series in March 1981 played by newcomer Chip Lucia, who went on to play the character through September 16, 1983.

MacHale returned in the role for dream sequences involving onscreen sister Viki for episodes in March and April 1987.

== Storylines ==
=== Prodigal son ===
In 1970, it is revealed Victor sired a secret son during World War II with his sister-in-law Dorothy Randolph. Victor (originally Ernest Graves) never met the child, and embarked on a search for him.

The assumed cousin of central heroine Victoria "Viki" Lord Riley (Erika Slezak), Tony Harris (Reinholt) arrives in Llanview in April 1975 in search of his birth father. Dr. Dorian Cramer (Nancy Pinkerton) and philandering married boyfriend Dr. Mark Toland (Tom Lee Jones) are first to recognize Tony as Victor's estranged son. Tony and Victor (Shepperd Strudwick onward) eventually learn of their relation and reunite but Dorian, hoping to maintain her hold on Victor's fortune, manipulates events to make father and son bitter enemies.

By 1976, the feud between Victor and Tony worsens, and Dorian persuades Victor to make her a main beneficiary of his will. Sensing his mortality, however, Victor softens towards Tony and father and son reconcile. with Tony adopting his father's surname.

In 1976, Tony Lord begins a romance with fragile Cathy Craig (Jennifer Harmon), whom he marries March 19. Cathy soon becomes pregnant with Tony but miscarries. Overwrought over the death of the stillborn child, Cathy begins to lose touch with reality and rages over the pregnancy news of archrival Viki with husband Joe Riley (Lee Patterson). Meanwhile, new Banner editor and Tony's ex-girlfriend Patricia "Pat" Ashley (Jacqueline Courtney) arrives in Llanview was still in love with him, but chooses to keep her distance from him. Pat soon confides in boss Viki that her young son, Brian Kendall (Steve Austin), was Tony's son and Viki's nephew. Soon, Pat decides to fight for Tony but uncovers him to be married.

Desperate to guarantee that she would inherit the Lord fortune, Dorian continues to alienate Victor from his son. But Tony soon discovers Dorian's machinations and tells his father; when Victor confronts his wife, Dorian admits that she'd known Tony's true identity from the beginning. Luckily for Dorian, a sudden stroke leaves Victor unable to speak. As Dorian schemed to keep him from recovering, Victor suffers a second stroke as he struggled to tell Viki what Dorian planned, dying onscreen June 16, 1976.

To everyone's surprise, Dorian was named executrix of Victor's will, and Tony was excluded altogether. Viki gives birth to Joe's son Kevin Lord Riley, but soon Tony's wife Cathy kidnaps the child. When delusional Cathy is found, she has no memory of taking the infant or where she had left him. Tony and Pat soon decide to no longer ignore their feelings for each other and consummate their feelings. By 1977, the loss of their son Kevin had taken its toll on Joe and Viki's marriage, with Dorian doing all she could to keep the couple separated. But when Cathy finally remembers enough to reveal to Tony (MacHale) where Kevin could be found, Joe and Viki reconcile and Cathy departs Llanview.

=== Pat and later life ===
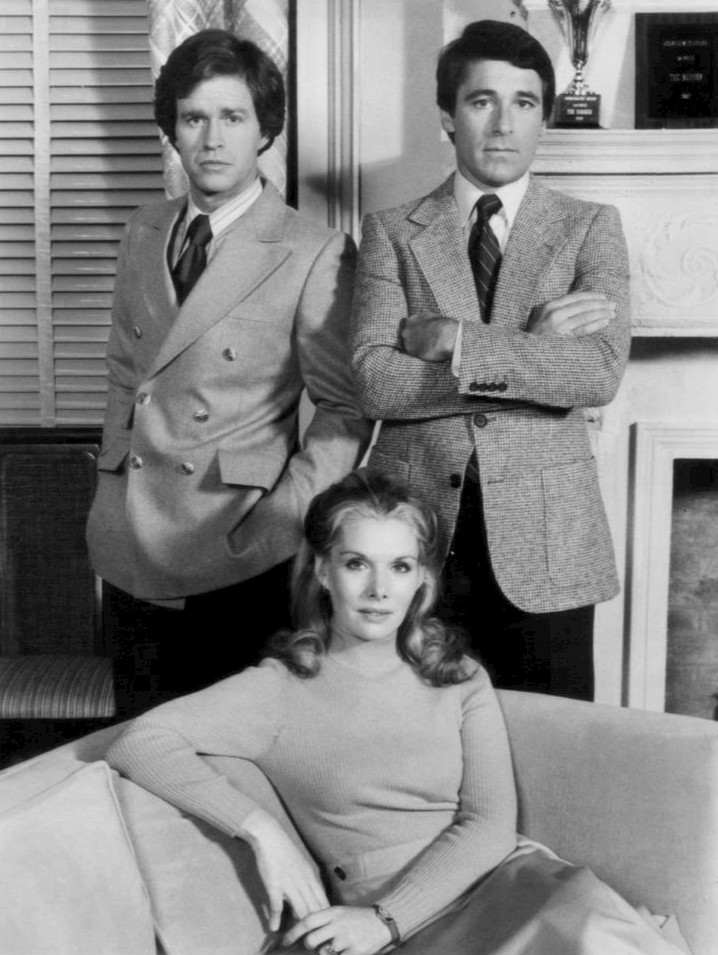
Philip MacHale as Tony, Jacqueline Courtney as Pat Ashley, and Tom Fuccello as Paul Kendall (1977)

Tony stays with Cathy until he feels she is able enough to handle a separation; in the meantime, Pat tells Tony that Brian was his son. When Tony and Cathy split, he and Pat engage to marry, but Brian hates Tony and reacts negatively to the news of the impending nuptials. When Pat's assumed dead husband Paul Kendall (Tom Fuccello) appears in Llanview very much alive, she sadly tells Tony she was welcoming Paul back into her life for Brian's sake. But soon after, Pat and Tony resume their affair. Pat finally tells Brian that Tony is his father in 1978, and an upset Brian runs out into the street, where he is hit and killed by a car driven by Talbot Huddleston (Byron Sanders) with Karen Wolek (Judith Light) riding along as a passenger.

Tony and Pat's relationship falls apart in the aftermath of Brian's death, and Tony leaves Llanview in 1979. He (Lucia) later returns in 1981 and befriends Bo Buchanan (Robert S. Woods). Tony and Pat soon reunite, marrying August 27, 1982. In 1983, Pat receives the news that Tony had been killed on assignment for The Banner in Lebanon by a terrorist group; the widow soon leaves Llanview to accept a job in Chicago. However, Tony's body or physical remains were never actually recovered.
