= Jenny Wolek =

- One Life to Live character
- Brynn Thayer as Jenny Wolek
- Portrayed by: Katherine Glass (1975–1978); Brynn Thayer (1978–1986)
- Duration: 1975–1986
- First appearance: June 1975
- Last appearance: May 1986
- Created by: Agnes Nixon; Gordon Russell
- Introduced by: Doris Quinlan
In-universe information
- Other names: Jenny Wolek (maiden name)
- Occupation: Physician at Llanview Hospital; Secretary; Novitiate nun
- Family: Wolek
- Sisters: Karen Wolek
- Spouse: Tim Siegel (1976); Brad Vernon (1978–1981); Peter Janssen (1981–1982); David Renaldi (1984–1997)
- Children: Mary Vernon (stillborn)

Jenny Wolek is a fictional character from the American soap opera One Life to Live. The distant cousin of original characters Larry, Anna, and Vince Wolek, Jenny debuted June 1975, appearing continually until May 1986.

== Casting and character history ==
=== Tim ===
Tim (Berenger) and Jenny (Glass), 1976

Jenny Wolek was originated by actress Katherine Glass in June 1975 and introduced as a novitiate nun preparing to take her final vows. Instead, she falls in love with Jewish, blue-collar Tim Siegel (Tom Berenger). When Jenny announces she is leaving the Order to marry Tim, her cousin Vince "Vinny" Wolek (Jordan Charney) heatedly objects, complaining of how Tim is "stealing Jenny from the church". A fist fight ensues, leading Vinny to aggravate in Tim a latent brain injury, which results in his being taken to the hospital in critical condition. Jenny marries Tim on his deathbed April 5, 1976, and she remains resentful toward Vinny for the duration of his appearance on the serial.

=== Brad ===
No longer planning to become a nun, Jenny takes a secretarial job with Dr. Will Vernon (Farley Granger) in 1976. Jenny grows enamored with Dr. Vernon but begins dating his son Brad (Jameson Parker) in 1977. The two marry on the episode aired January 3, 1978. Soon after marrying, Jenny learns Brad is a philanderer and the two suffer a rocky marriage. Actress Brynn Thayer, a fan of Katherine Glass' Jenny, assumed the role in August 1978 amid a contract dispute between Glass and ABC Daytime. Jenny becomes pregnant into 1979 and looks forward to motherhood. But the stress of a perpetually unfaithful Brad (Steve Fletcher onward) and learning he had raped her sister, Karen (Judith Light), causes Jenny to blackout, go into premature labor, and give birth stillborn daughter Mary Vernon in November. Not told her child was dead in the morgue instead of the maternity ward, misguided sister Karen conspires in a plot with ex-boyfriend-con man Marco Dane (Gerald Anthony) to switch dead Mary with a live newborn.

=== Mary Vernon and Peter ===
Jenny rears a child born during Jenny's delivery to Karen's former fellow prostitutes, Katrina Karr (Nancy Snyder). She then divorces Brad, marrying Dr. Peter Janssen (Denny Albee) September 2, 1981. She is soon widowed for a second time when Peter is killed in a car accident in May 1982. Only a short time after losing her husband Peter, Jenny learns the truth about Karen's baby switch and makes the wrenching decision to give the child back to Katrina. Unknown to Jenny and Katrina, both of their children were fathered by Brad.

=== David Renaldi and death ===
Jenny next engages in a relationship with David "David Renaldi" Reynolds (Michael Zaslow), the former lover of Dr. Dorian Lord (Robin Strasser) and father to Dorian's daughter, Cassie. Despite being married to Herb Callison (Anthony Call) at the time, Dorian does her best to split up Jenny and David. After finally getting Dorian to relent, Jenny and David wed June 1, 1984. She soon becomes worrisome upon learning David to be a secret agent investigating communist espionage activity for the American government. Jenny last appears onscreen making amends with cousin Larry and ex-husband Brad before relocating to Switzerland with David in May 1986.

David Renaldi returns to Llanview in 1997, divulging to Dorian that Jenny was assumed dead in Switzerland from an avalanche.

== Reception ==
Jenny Wolek was a part of a move by new head writer Gordon Russell in 1975 to incorporate younger talent into the cast following the 1973 onscreen death of Meredith Lord, played by Lynn Benesch. Katherine Glass garnered much fanfare and controversy as one-half of soap opera's first teen and interfaith supercouple alongside Tom Berenger (Tim Siegel). Glass' Jenny had particular resonance with younger viewers who identified with the Wolek heroine.

Brynn Thayer's work as a Jenny learning her daughter, Mary Vernon, was stillborn and switched soon after birth with the child she raised for two years, Kristine Karr, is considered one of OLTL's most tragic and riveting performances.
