= Larry Wolek =

- One Life to Live character
- Michael Storm as Larry Wolek
- Portrayed by: Paul Tulley (1968); Jim Storm (1968); Michael Storm (1969–2004)
- Duration: 1968–2004
- First appearance: July 15, 1968
- Last appearance: May 28, 2004
- Created by: Agnes Nixon
- Introduced by: Doris Quinlan
- Crossover appearances: All My Children
In-universe information
- Occupation: Physician; Chief of staff
- Family: Wolek
- Brothers: Vince Wolek
- Sisters: Anna Wolek
- Spouse: Karen Martin (1969); Meredith Lord (1970–73); Karen Wolek (1977–79); Laurel Chapin (1985–86)
- Sons: Daniel Wolek
- Daughters: Stillborn daughter
- Nieces: Cathy Craig (adoptive)

Larry Wolek is a fictional character from the American soap opera One Life to Live, played for 35 years by actor Michael Storm. Storm is the second longest running cast member of the ABC Daytime production after actress Erika Slezak (Victoria Lord), and he briefly crossed over in the role on premiere episodes of All My Children in 1970.

The character is one of the lead protagonists and the youngest member of the Wolek family introduced in the July 15, 1968, television pilot, continually appearing until May 28, 2004.

== Casting ==
The role of Larry was originally played by Paul Tulley, who appears from the debut of the series in July 1968 through episodes in August of that year. Actor Jim Storm soon assumed the role in August, playing Larry through December 1968 (he accepted a role on fellow ABC soap Dark Shadows a year and a half after leaving One Life to Live). Jim Storm recommended to showrunners that his brother Michael Storm replace him as Larry, for which Michael was hired and appeared as the character from January 1969 onward through his (and its) last onscreen appearance opposite actor Philip Carey (Asa Buchanan) on the episode aired May 28, 2004.

== Storylines ==
=== Enter Larry ===
The younger brother of Anna (Doris Belack) and Vince Wolek (Antony Ponzini), Dr. Larry Wolek (Paul Tulley) is introduced as the boyfriend of rich socialite Meredith Lord (Trish Van Devere), a match which Meredith's father, media magnate Victor Lord (Ernest Graves), does not approve. In July 1968, Victor pushes Meredith into an engagement with the more socially acceptable Dr. Ted Hale (Terry Logan). Meredith's engagement to Ted ends when he stumbles down a Llanview Hospital staircase to his death while arguing with Larry. Nurse Karen Martin (Niki Flacks) tells police she overheard Larry and Ted arguing over Meredith and Larry threatening Ted, and Larry is arrested for murder.

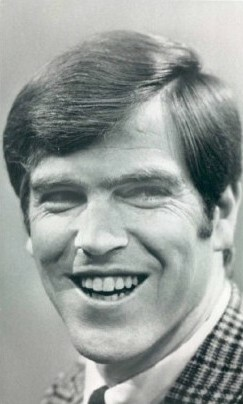
Michael Storm as Larry, circa 1973

Larry (Jim Storm) stands trial for the death and is nearly convicted until a revelation in court that Larry threatened Ted to keep secret Meredith suffered from a terminal blood disease and, ultimately, that Ted had fallen by accident. In December, Larry is released from incarceration and hopes to spend with Meredith, but she learns the truth and leaves Llanview for San Francisco to die with her maternal family. Meredith leaves Larry a Dear John letter dissuading him for loving her and advising him to move on. A devastated Larry finds solace with Karen.

Karen soon saves Larry from a fire that left him badly burned and bandaged for weeks. In January 1969, Larry (Michael Storm onward) recovers and gives in to Karen's romantic advances. Meredith (Lynn Benesch onward) soon returns from California with her condition miraculously improved, and Larry hopes for a reconciliation. Meredith admits to Larry her love for him, but Karen then reveals to Larry her pregnancy with their child. A heartbroken Larry marries Karen to prevent her from having an illegal abortion, but she miscarries in 1970 from the stress of knowing Larry loved Meredith. Karen and Larry soon separate, but Meredith had already become engaged to Tom Edwards (Joseph Gallison). Meredith promises to stay with Tom, but Tom rebuffs her knowing Meredith desires more to be with Larry.

Meredith and Larry marry June 25, 1970, and soon decide to start a family. Larry soon treats Cathy Craig for drug abuse, and Meredith becomes pregnant with twins. In November 1971, Larry's mentor Dr. Jim Craig (Nat Polen) delivers the children, but only one, named Daniel Wolek, survives childbirth. Meredith begins suffering from postpartum depression, and Larry soon calls in a favor to friend Dr. Joyce Brothers (playing herself) to treat his ailing wife. Tragedy strikes the happily married couple in 1973 when thieves break into Meredith's father's home at Llanfair, and Meredith fatally falls as she attempts to escape. Before dying, Meredith asks sister Victoria "Viki" Lord Riley (Erika Slezak) to tell Larry that he brought happiness to her life. The widower is left to raise their infant son Daniel alone.

=== Karen Wolek ===
By the mid-1970s, Larry's distant cousins Jenny (Katherine Glass) and Karen Wolek (Kathryn Breech) arrive in Llanview, and he falls in love with Karen. After a whirlwind romance, Larry and Karen marry March 31, 1977. Karen (Judith Light onward) soon becomes dissatisfied with her life as an upper middle class housewife, and surreptitiously supplements her husband's allowance by joining in upscale prostitution ring run by her con man ex-boyfriend Marco Dane (Gerald Anthony). Happily married to the love of his life, Larry first learns of Karen's prostitution when she is coerced into admitting it on the stand when Viki is put on trial for Marco's apparent murder in 1979. Larry and Karen divorce after the public revelation in August, but the two eventually become close friends. Storm regarded his storyline with Light's Karen as his favorite during his tenure with the series. Karen departs Llanview for witness protection in Canada in 1983 with agent Steve Piermont (Robert Desiderio), tearfully bidding farewell to Larry.

=== Laurel and Dan ===
With Karen gone, Larry soon begins medically treating and romancing Laurel Chapin (Janice Lynde) in 1983 after accidentally hitting her with his car. Concurrently, SORASed 18-year-old Daniel (Timothy Waldrip) returns to Llanview from abroad and begins work as a cub reporter for his aunt Viki at her Banner newspaper, but soon romances Viki's former stepmother and Larry's former hospital colleague Dr. Dorian Lord Callison (Robin Strasser), much the chagrin of the two former. Daniel eventually ends his trysts at his father's and aunt's insistence, and Larry and Laurel marry January 15, 1985, at Llanfair. Laurel dies in a car accident in March 1986, leaving Larry widowed for the second time.

Daniel (Joshua Cox) returns in August 1986, now a doctor in-residence under his Llanview Hospital chief-of-staff father. Daniel soon becoming involved with hospital volunteer and Mitch Laurence cult member Allison Perkins (Barbara Garrick). Larry fails to dissuade Daniel from pursuing Allison, but only after Allison is revealed to be culpable in the kidnapping of Daniel's newborn cousin Jessica Buchanan does Daniel listen to his father's advice and leaves town.

=== Later years ===
Larry gradually becomes a supporting role into the 1990s after Daniel (Michael Palance) leaves town following another stint in 1991. For the rest of the decade and into the 2000s, Larry becomes featured mainly featured in his position as hospital chief of staff and close confidante to sister-in-law Viki and her extended family. Larry last appears on the series on the May 28, 2004, episode, where he informs Viki's immediate family of his successful heart transplant surgery on her.

== Reception ==
The storyline of the recasting of the role of Larry to actor Michael Storm in January 1969 was met with fanfare and acclaim, particularly at the explanation of the change in Larry's face being attributed to plastic surgery as he had been severely burned in a fire; this recasting method of popular lead characters would go on to be reused on various other soap operas including Dynasty, and again on One Life to Live with the recastings of Max Holden and Todd Manning.

Michael Storm's portrayal of Larry earned him a Daytime Emmy Award nomination in the category of Lead Actor in a Drama Series in 1978.
