= Karen Wolek =

Fictional character

- One Life to Live character
- Judith Light as Karen Wolek
- Portrayed by: Kathryn Breech (1976–77); Julia Duffy (1977); Judith Light (1977–83)
- Duration: 1976–83
- First appearance: May 1976
- Last appearance: February 1, 1983
- Created by: Gordon Russell
- Introduced by: Doris Quinlan
In-universe information
- Occupation: Housewife; Prostitute
- Family: Wolek
- Sisters: Jenny Wolek
- Spouse: Larry Wolek (1977–79)

Karen Wolek is a fictional character appearing on the American soap opera One Life to Live between May 1976 and February 1983. The role was most notably performed by Judith Light beginning on October 21, 1977. Karen ultimately departs for an off-screen life in Canada, coinciding with Light's departure from the series.

== Casting ==
Newcomer Kathryn Breech originated the role of Karen from May 1976 until October 1977. Julia Duffy filled in for 1 episode on October 18, 1977 and Kathryn returned for a few days until the character was permanently recast with theater actress Judith Light. Light was offered the role after auditioning as an understudy. Light departed in 1983—to star in ABC's new primetime sitcom Who's the Boss?—and the role of Karen was not recast.

== Background and storylines ==
=== 1976–77 ===
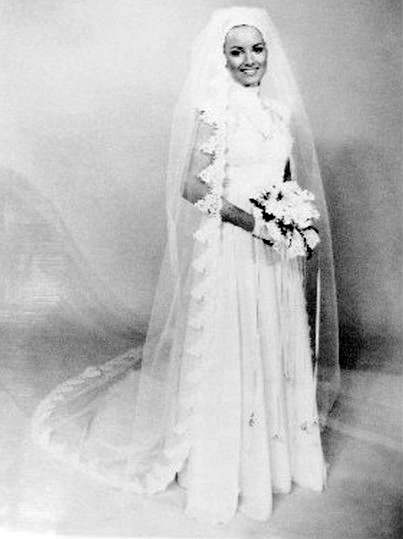
Kathryn Breech as Karen Wolek at her wedding to Larry, 1977

The sister of Jenny (Katherine Glass) and distant cousin to the Woleks, Karen (Kathryn Breech) first appears on screen in 1976, a year after her sister's arrival. Where Jenny was created as a confident, kind-hearted heroine, Karen was presented as a scheming, two-dimensional gold digger. She sought an easy life as the fiancée of wealthy doctor and distant cousin Larry Wolek (Michael Storm). As Karen and Larry's wedding day approached, Karen entangled herself with recently arrived former lover and con artist Marco Dane (Gerald Anthony), who threatened to reveal the dealings of their past relationship with Larry. They marry onscreen March 31, 1977. As fiscally-responsible breadwinner Larry refused to dole out exorbitant allowances to pay for his fiancée's expensive tastes, Karen soon engaged in afternoon trysts with wealthy businessmen such as Talbot Huddleston (Byron Sanders) in order to afford luxuries. When Marco discovered Karen's dalliances, he forced her (Julia Duffy) to become a "housewife hooker," prostituting in order for Karen to prevent Larry from uncovering the truth.

=== 1977–83 ===
By late 1977, Karen's leading storyline ramped up when actress Judith Light notably assumed the role of Karen. Early on, the character tended to be a typical soap opera gold-digging vixen, Light brought the character and the show to critical-acclaim. Light's extensive theater experience added multidimensional facets to the character. Light's Karen grew to suffer from low self-esteem, driven by an obsessive desire for love and acceptance. As she steps into the role, Karen's afternoon affairs become less about money and more about her dissatisfaction and boredom with being a stay-at-home suburban housewife.

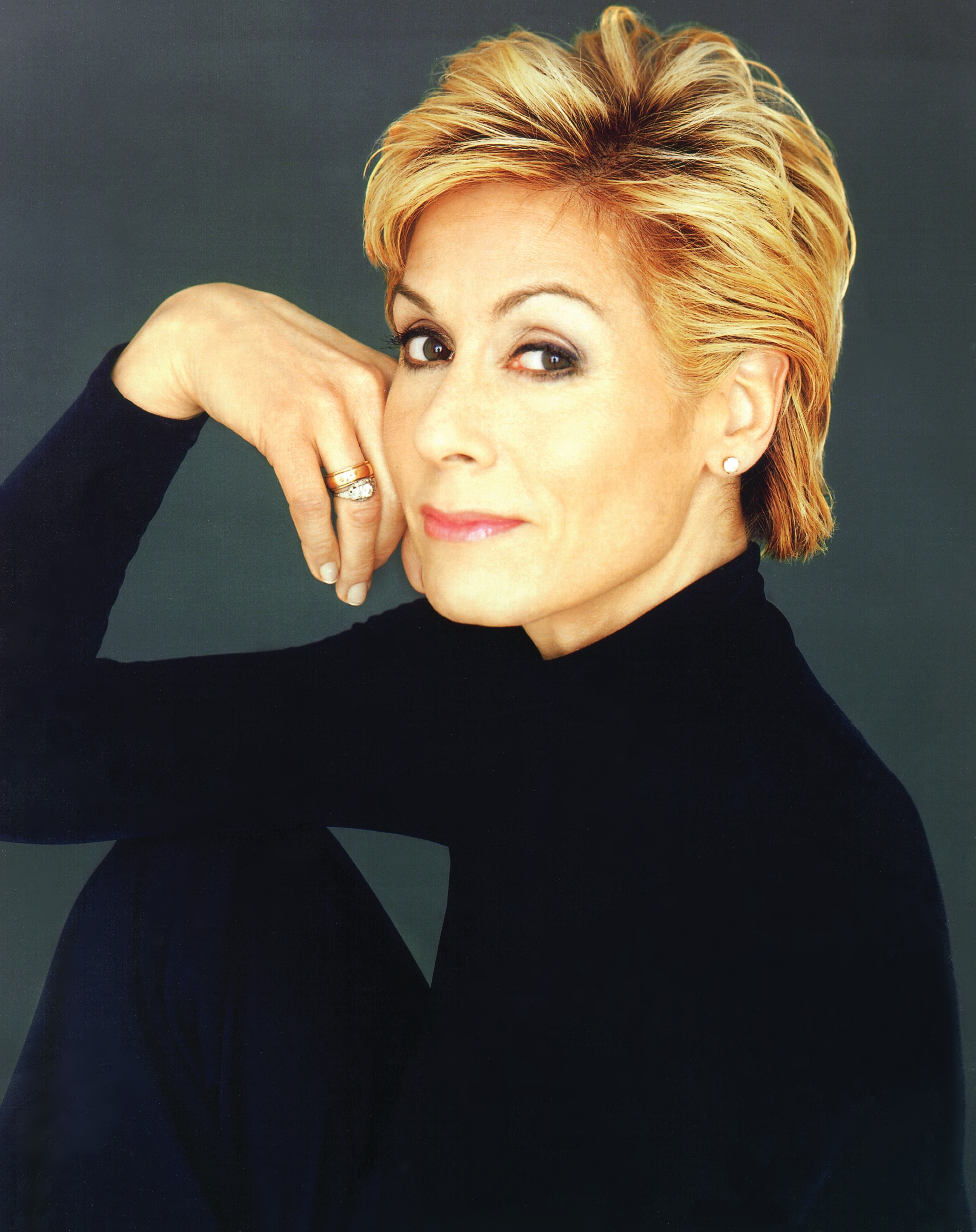
Judith Light, most notable in the role of Karen (1977–83)

In 1978, Karen (Light, onward) at last confided in her friend and media tycoon Victoria "Viki" Lord Riley (Erika Slezak) as to the details of the life she was leading. Viki promised to keep Karen's lurid secret, and soon waged a public campaign of her resources as publisher of The Banner newspaper and other outlets against Marco's brothel, which masqueraded as a modeling agency. Amid the turmoil, Marco was apparently murdered. Viki was then charged with and tried for his apparent murder. With guilt festering in her conscience, Karen testified at Viki's trial in 1979. Coming to Viki's defense, Karen broke down at the witness stand, unable to corroborate a timeline of her whereabouts without admitting to her dealings with Marco. Light's Karen lashed out on the stand at Llanview District Attorney Herb Callison (Anthony Call), revealing her secret life of prostitution to jurors and, for the first time, to her now-husband Larry. Upon hearing of the revelation, Larry requested an immediate divorce from Karen, to which she conceded.

Karen found refuge while living in the boarding house of Ina Hopkins (Sally Gracie). There, she discovered that Marco Dane was still alive and living under an assumed identity. During this time, Karen is raped by Brad Vernon (Steve Fletcher) and pulled into a stolen-baby debacle with her sister Jenny (Brynn Thayer). Karen is then troubled by menacing Llanview Hospital doctor, Ivan Kipling (Jack Betts). Dr. Kipling, a prominent surgeon and one her former clients, feared she would expose him. Ivan unsuccessfully attempts to kill Karen who, upon escaping, is taken to the hospital where an unknowing Dr. Kipling receives Karen as his trauma victim. After treating her, Ivan develops an unhealthy infatuation with Karen, for which his is unable to attempt to murder her again, instead leaving Llanview with the looming threat. Ivan later returns to menace Karen again, brainwashing Larry to undermine the integrity of his extended family and namely Karen.

It was during this odd caper that Karen met government agent Steve Piermont (Robert Desiderio). Upon their meeting in 1983, the character of Karen said a final goodbye to rehabilitated former husband Larry and enemy-turned-friend Marco, leaving Llanview to enter witness protection and a romantic relationship with Steve in Canada.

== Reception ==
Judith Light's portrayal of Karen in the Viki Lord Riley (Slezak)–Marco Dane (Anthony) murder caper brought the show critical acclaim and is credited with garnering One Life to Live ratings successes from the late 1970s into the early 1980s. Light's dramatic, confessional courtroom performance of a housewife-turned-prostitute on the witness stand is regarded as one of the most memorable moments in television by TV Guide, and her work on the series earned Light two consecutive Daytime Emmy Awards for Outstanding Lead Actress in a Drama Series in 1980 and 1981, in addition to other acting awards.
