= Jim Craig (One Life to Live) =

- One Life to Live character
- Nat Polen as Jim Craig
- Portrayed by: Robert Milli (1968–69); Nat Polen (1969–81)
- Duration: 1968–81
- First appearance: October 28, 1968
- Last appearance: April 1981
- Created by: Agnes Nixon
- Introduced by: Doris Quinlan
In-universe information
- Other names: James Craig
- Occupation: Physician; Chief of staff
- Spouse: Unnamed Nolan (pre-1968); Anna Wolek (1970–81)
- Daughters: Cathy Craig
- Grandchildren: Megan Craig Riley

Jim Craig is a fictional character on the American soap opera One Life to Live played notably by actor Nat Polen from May 1969 until the actor and character's off-screen death in May 1981. Love Is a Many Splendored Thing actor Robert Milli originated the role from October 28, 1968 until 1969.

== Storylines ==
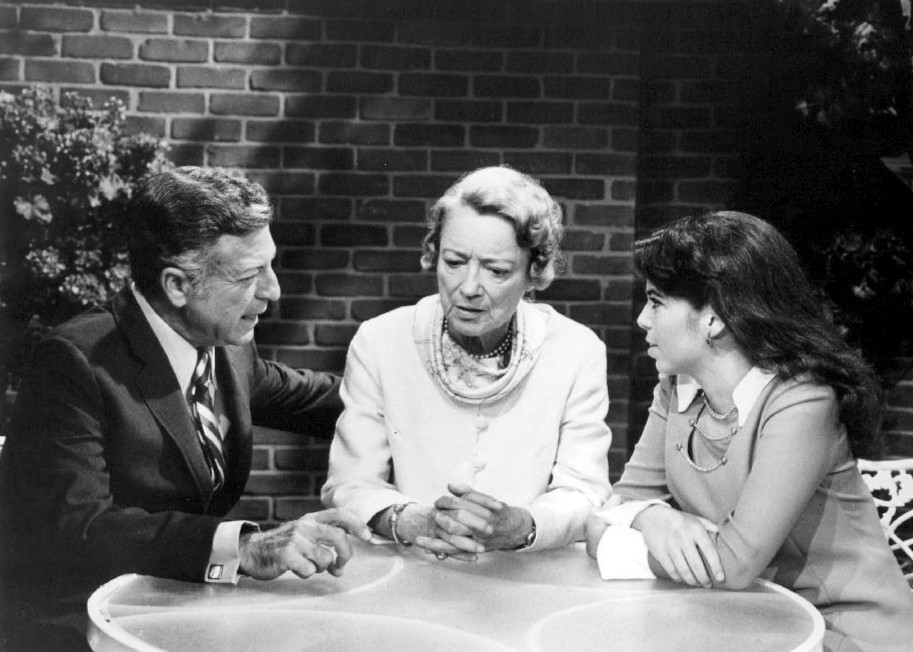
Nat Polen as Jim, with Peggy Wood as Kate Nolan, and Amy Levitt as Cathy in 1970.

At the start of the series, Jim is introduced as a neurologist and the chief of staff at Llanview Hospital in fictional Llanview, Pennsylvania. He becomes supervisor and mentor to Llanview Hospital resident physicians Larry Wolek (Paul Tulley, Michael Storm after 1969) and Price Trainor (Peter DeAnda). Jim, a widower, has a young daughter, Cathy Craig. He falls in love with a young patient and aspiring actress Carla Benari (Ellen Holly) at the start of series in 1968.

Dr. Craig soon asks Clara to marry him, and she accepts, even though she knows she does love him as much as he loves her. Jim continues to profess his love of Carla, even after learning that the assumed Italian American "Clara Benari" is actually a light-skinned black American Carla Gray (Holly) passing for white.

Nevertheless, Carla returns his engagement ring. Soon afterward, Jim falls in love with Anna Wolek (Doris Belack) in 1969, and the two marry onscreen April 10, 1970. Throughout the 1970s, Jim and Anna primarily serve as supporting characters, Jim as a primary town doctor, and Anna as a housewife and socialite who offers wise advise to the more dynamic characters. Jim's daughter Cathy, however, becomes a major troublemaker.

Actor Nat Polen played the role for 12 years, working and taping episodes for the show until days before his death from undisclosed pancreatic cancer May 3, 1981, aged 66. The character is killed off concurrently and dies off-screen. Widow Anna leaves Llanview in December 1982.

== Impact ==
One of the first popular storylines on One Live to Live involved the 1968 interracial relationship and love triangle of the white American Dr. Jim Craig (Milli), black American Dr. Price Trainor (DeAnda), and light-skinned black woman passing for Italian American Carla (Benari) Gray (Holly). The plot gained a following and a controversial reception, and prompted an ABC affiliate in Texas to temporarily drop One Life to Live from its ABC Daytime lineup due to uproar at "white" Carla engaging in a romantic relationship with Dr. Trainor, a story that revealed Carla to actually be black and her actual interracial romance being with Dr. Craig. The interracial love triangle storyline also caused the show to receive an increased amount of fan mail.

The long-running pairing of Dr. Craig (Nolen) with Anna Wolek (Belack) was popularly received as familial patriarch and matriarch figures in early episodes of the series. The raising of Jim's daughter and Anna's stepdaughter Cathy Craig and their insistence that she seek treatment for drug addiction at the real-life Odyssey House in New York City brought the show critical acclaim.
