= Eileen Riley Siegel =

- One Life to Live character
- Alice Hirson as Eileen Riley Siegel
- Portrayed by: Patricia Roe (1968–72); Alice Hirson (1972–76)
- Duration: 1968–76
- First appearance: July 19, 1968
- Last appearance: May 1976
- Created by: Agnes Nixon
- Introduced by: Doris Quinlan
- Crossover appearances: All My Children
In-universe information
- Other names: Eileen Riley (maiden name)
- Occupation: Housewife
- Family: Riley
- Brothers: Joe Riley; Tom Dennison
- Spouse: Dave Siegel (before 1968–72)
- Children: Tim Siegel; Julie Siegel
- Nephews: Kevin Riley Buchanan; Joey Riley Buchanan
- Nieces: Megan Craig Riley; Mari Lynn Dennison

Eileen Riley Siegel is a fictional character on the American soap opera One Life to Live. The role was played by Patricia Roe from July 1968 until March 1972, and by Alice Hirson from March 1972 until the character's last appearance in May 1976.

== Background and storyline ==
Introduced as a supporting character and older sister to protagonist Joe Riley (Lee Patterson), Eileen Riley Siegel (Roe) is an Irish Catholic married to Jewish lawyer Dave Siegel (Allen Miller) featured in one of the first interfaith marriages on American soap operas. When Joe initially marries media heiress and lead protagonist Victoria Lord (Gillian Spencer, Erika Slezak after 1971) in June 1969, the Siegels' twin children, Julie Siegel (Lee Warwick) and Tim Siegel (Bill Fowler, William Cox), premiere on the series. David serves as the primary legal counsel for dynamic characters on the series, and Eileen as the familial confidante of Joe.

While on a reporting assignment in California for The Banner in September 1970, journalist Joe is presumed dead after his car drives over a cliff and his body goes missing. Joe's widow Victoria Lord Riley (Slezak) declares him legally dead and begins dating Steve Burke (Bernard Grant) in 1971, to Eileen's grief as she held out hope her brother survived the crash. Victoria marries Steve in 1972, and Joe reappears in Llanview soon thereafter. The reappearance of Joe delights his sister (Hirson), but leaves Victoria dismayed at her possible bigamy. Victoria and Joe's marriage is dissolved at his legal 1970 death date. Joe and Victoria eventually remarry in September 1974.

Dave dies of a heart attack in December 1972, and Eileen copes by abusing painkillers in 1973. Eventually she seeks treatment from Dr. Dorian Cramer (Nancy Pinkerton). Julie's husband Dr. Mark Toland (Tom Lee Jones) carries on an extramarital affair with Dorian, unbeknownst to Julie (Leonie Norton after 1974). Eileen briefly romances Ben Farmer (Rod Browning), whose wife Rachel Wilson Farmer (Nancy Barrett) dies because of a hospital mishap involving Dorian and Mark. Julie strongly objects to Eileen dating anyone, and demands she remain utterly devoted to the memory of David. Julie goes so far as trying to seduce Ben in order to break up her mother's relationship with him.

Eileen's son Tim (Tom Berenger) returns to Llanview a law school dropout in 1975, leaving Eileen shocked. He becomes a construction worker and betroths Jenny Wolek (Katherine Glass). Eileen disapproves of the speed of the engagement and persuades him to postpone rushed nuptials. Tim suffers an accident in a fight with Vince Wolek (Jordan Charney) in 1976 that leaves him gravely injured, and he marries Jenny shortly before dying that April. Mourning Tim, the mother and daughter widows Eileen and Julie leave Llanview for Florida in May 1976.
