= Paul Tulley =

American film and television actor

- Born: May 1, 1942 (age 84); Newark, Delaware, U.S.
- Education: American Academy of Dramatic Arts
- Occupations: Film and television actor
- Years active: 1968–2002

Paul Tulley (born May 1, 1942) is an American film and television actor. He is known for playing Sgt. Roberts in the American private detective television series Harry O.

== Life and career ==
Tulley was born in Newark, Delaware. He attended Newark High School, where he graduated in 1960. He attended the American Academy of Dramatic Arts from 1965 to 1967. Tulley began his acting career in 1968, appearing in the television soap opera One Life to Live, where he was the first actor to play the character Larry Wolek. He was replaced by actor, Jim Storm later that year.

Tulley guest-starred in television programs including Cannon, The Hardy Boys/Nancy Drew Mysteries, Lou Grant, Laverne & Shirley, CHiPs, The Young and the Restless, Knots Landing, Falcon Crest, The Six Million Dollar Man and Mannix. In 1975, he joined the cast of the ABC private detective television series Harry O, playing Sgt. Roberts.

Tulley played Mr. Taylor in the 1985 film Real Genius. He appeared in such other films as Joy of Sex, Meteor, Lifetime Contract and The Kid from Not-So-Big. Tulley retired in 2002, last appearing in the legal drama television series Judging Amy.
