= Cathy Craig =

- One Life to Live character
- Jennifer Harmon as Cathy Craig
- Portrayed by: Catherine Burns (1969); Amy Levitt (1969–71); Jane Alice Brandon (1971–72); Dorrie Kavanaugh (1972–76); Jennifer Harmon (1976–78)
- Duration: 1969–78
- First appearance: January 1969
- Last appearance: November 1978
- Created by: Agnes Nixon
- Introduced by: Doris Quinlan
- Dorrie Kavanaugh as Cathy Craig
In-universe information
- Other names: Catherine Craig Lord
- Occupation: Writer; Journalist
- Family: Wolek (adoptive)
- Father: Jim Craig
- Adoptive mother: Anna Wolek
- Spouse: Tony Lord (1976–1977)
- Daughters: Megan Craig Riley
- Grandmothers: Kate Nolan
- Aunts and uncles: Fran Gordon; Vince Wolek (adoptive); Larry Wolek (adoptive)
- First cousins: Mick Gordon

Cathy Craig is a fictional character on the American soap opera One Life to Live. Introduced onscreen in January 1969, the character role is the first ongoing antagonist to lead heroine Victoria Lord and last appears in November 1978.

== Casting ==
Actress Catherine Burns originated the role of Cathy Craig in 1969. The role was then assumed by actress Amy Levitt from September 1969 through May 1971, when she was replaced by actress Jane Alice Brandon. Brandon appeared on One Life to Live from May 1971 through October 1972, when series creator Agnes Nixon recast the role again to Dorrie Kavanaugh. Kavanaugh played Cathy longer than any other actress in the role, from October 1972 until June 1976, until she was fired by executive producer Doris Quinlan. Jennifer Harmon played the role until the character's final appearance in November 1978.

In late 1975, actress Robin Strasser was offered a long-term contract with the series to take up the role but declined upon the knowledge that Kavanaugh would be fired to accommodate the recast. Strasser would later go on to join the show in 1979 as Dorian Lord.

== Storylines ==
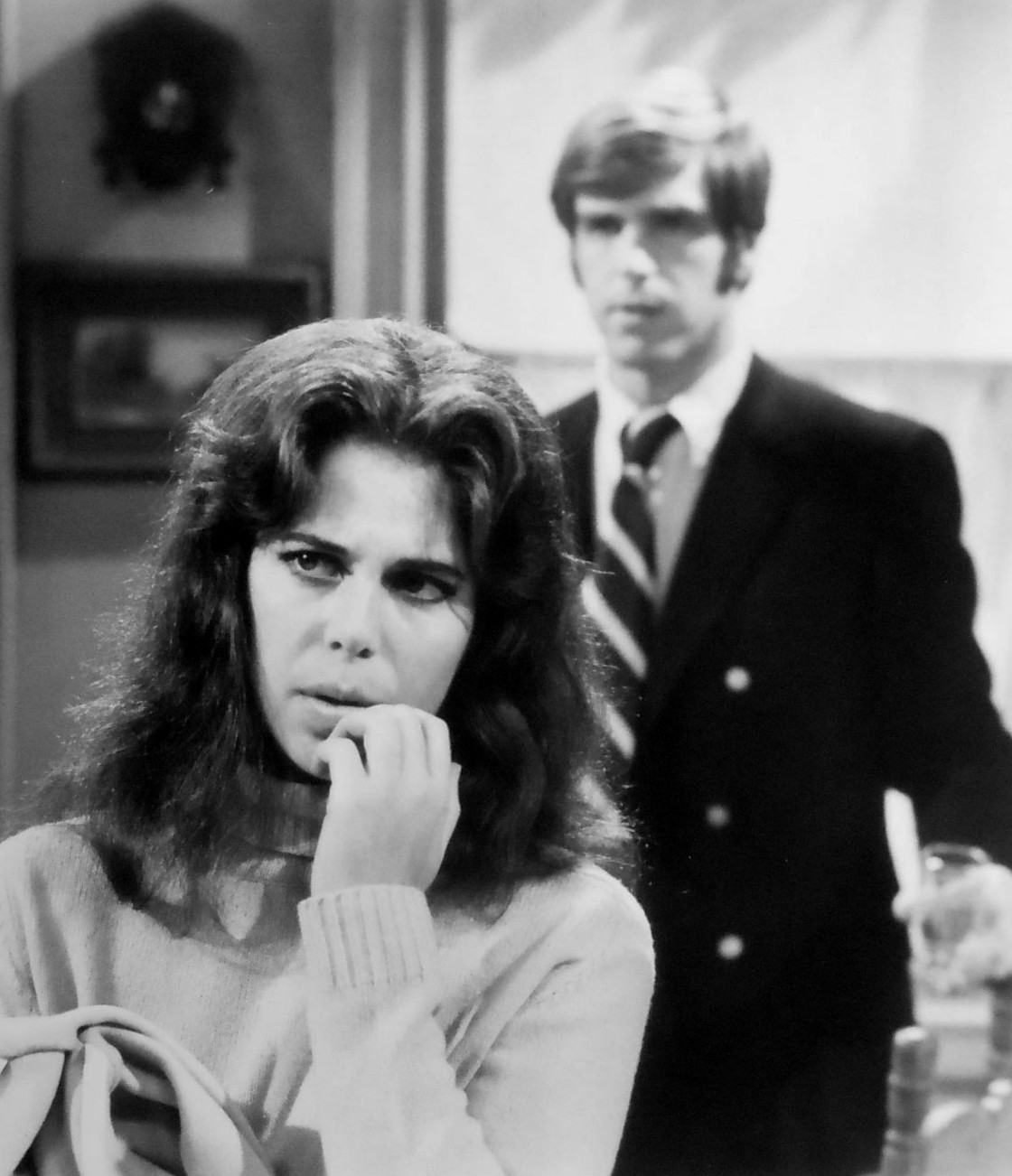
Amy Levitt as Cathy Craig in a scene with Michael Storm as Dr. Larry Wolek, c. 1971

Cathy is initially introduced as the unseen child daughter of Llanview Hospital chief-of-staff Dr. Jim Craig (originally, Robert Milli) in 1968. When the character debuts on-screen in March 1969, she is aged to a seventeen-year-old teenager. Harboring an Electra complex toward her father, Cathy (Burns) grew increasingly jealous of the time her prospective stepmother Anna Wolek (Doris Belack) was spending with her father. Cathy (Levitt) rebelled against Jim (now, Nat Polen onward) and Anna by using drugs, eventually becoming an addict and killing her dealer Artie Duncan (John Cullum) in an LSD-fueled maniacal episode. Cathy seeks treatment for her addiction at the culturally relevant Odyssey House in New York City (a real treatment center) in 1970.

She (Kavanaugh) soon begins reporting stories for The Banner when Victoria "Viki" Lord Burke (Erika Slezak) hires her, becoming the character's first active nemesis. Cathy briefly engages in an affair with Banner chief editor and Viki's then-fiancé, Steve Burke (Bernie Grant). Later, just before Viki remarries first husband Joe Riley (Lee Patterson) after returning to town following his apparent death, Cathy becomes pregnant by Joe from a brief romance in 1973. Joe insists on marrying her but she declines and resigns to single motherhood. Joe and Viki remarry in September, and months later Cathy gives birth to her and Joe's daughter, Megan Craig Riley, December 2, 1974. Joe is told that baby Megan is born with a congenital heart defect that ensures she would never live to adulthood; fearing she would not take the news well, Joe keeps Megan's condition from Cathy. While caring for stepdaughter Megan, Viki is involved in a car accident while rushing an ailing Megan to the hospital during a storm in October 1975. The accident leaves Viki in a coma and assures baby Megan's death. Believing Viki intentionally caused the accident, Cathy swears vengeance on the newspaper heiress.

Emotionally reeling and plotting, Cathy (Harmon) marries Viki's newly arrived brother and maternal cousin, Tony Lord (George Reinholt), in 1976; unknown to Cathy, Tony was truly in love with sweetheart Pat Ashley (Jacqueline Courtney). Adding to Cathy's emotional strife was that Viki became pregnant herself, and gives birth to baby boy Kevin Lord Riley that year, but the child does not inherit the heart condition that plagued Megan. Cathy's mental state wavers at this point, and she becomes obsessed with having a baby with Tony. Cathy miscarries her second child and proceeds to fall into psychosis. She then kidnaps baby Kevin and disappears for several months. When she is finally located in 1977, Cathy is found in catatonia but without baby Kevin. Many more months go by before Cathy recovered sufficiently to tell Joe, Viki, and Tony the location of the baby. After completely recovering from her breakdown, Cathy grants Tony a divorce and leaves Llanview.

== Reception ==
The role of Cathy was created by series creator Agnes Nixon as one of the first feminists on American soap operas. Amy Levitt's portrayals of an increasingly drug-addled Cathy earned national coverage by media outlets who praised the show for its realistic showcase of addiction and drug rehabilitation. The last actress to play Cathy, Jennifer Harmon, earned a Daytime Emmy Award nomination for Outstanding Lead Actress in a Drama Series in 1978, the first nomination in the category for the show.
