= Meredith Lord =

- One Life to Live character
- Lynn Benesch as Meredith Lord Wolek
- Portrayed by: Trish Van Devere (1968); Lynn Benesch (1969–87)
- Duration: 1968–73; 1987
- First appearance: July 15, 1968
- Last appearance: April 1987
- Created by: Agnes Nixon
- Introduced by: Doris Quinlan; Paul Rauch (1987)
- Trish Van Devere as Meredith Lord
In-universe information
- Other names: Meredith Lord Wolek
- Occupation: Socialite; Housewife; Hospital volunteer
- Family: Lord
- Father: Victor Lord (Note: Victor always questioned Meredith's paternity, however, her paternity was never actually dis-proven.)
- Mother: Eugenia Randolph Lord
- Siblings: Tony Lord; Victoria Lord; Tina Lord; Todd Manning; Victor Lord, Jr.
- Spouse: Larry Wolek (1970–73)
- Sons: Daniel Wolek
- Aunts and uncles: Clayton-Powell Lord I; Gwendolyn Lord Abbott; Dorothy Randolph
- Nieces and nephews: Megan Gordon; Brian Kendall; Kevin Riley Buchanan; Joey Riley Buchanan; Jessica Buchanan; Natalie Buchanan; C. J. Roberts; Sarah Roberts; Starr Manning; Danielle Manning; Jack Manning; Sam Manning
- First cousins: Richard Abbott; Clayton-Powell Lord II; Powell Lord III (once removed)

Meredith Lord is a fictional character from the American soap opera One Life to Live.

Actress Trish Van Devere originated the role of Meredith from the series pilot aired July 15, 1968 through December 1968. Meredith was then recast by series creator and writer Agnes Nixon to Lynn Benesch, who became most associated with the role by playing the character from January 1969 until the character's onscreen death August 8, 1973. Benesch last appeared in the role briefly in April 1987.

== Storylines ==
=== Enter Meredith ===
The daughter of newspaper tycoon Victor Lord (then played by Ernest Graves) and his deceased wife Eugenia, Meredith (Trish Van Devere) is the younger sister of main protagonist Victoria Lord (then Gillian Spencer). An assertive free spirit, Meredith defies her father by dating upwardly-mobile Dr. Larry Wolek (then Paul Tulley), a suitor not to Victor's liking. Larry was of Polish descent and his siblings had scrimped to put him through medical school, so he did not come from an old moneyed family like the Lords. In the opening months of the serial, Victor pushed Meredith into an engagement with the more socially-acceptable Dr. Ted Hale (played by Terry Logan). Ted accidentally falls down a flight of stairs at Llanview Hospital while in the company of Larry (then Jim Storm). Hospital nurse Karen Martin (Niki Flacks) overheard, from the other side of the closed stairwell door, Larry and Ted argue over Meredith, and Larry threaten Ted. Karen tells this to the police, leading to Larry's arrest.

Larry stands trial for murder and is nearly convicted, but it is revealed he threatened Ted over keeping Meredith's terminal blood disease a secret. Larry is released from custody and hopes to spend time with Meredith in her remaining days. Meredith learns of her condition from Dr. Steve Hardy (John Beradino), in a crossover role as consultant on her case from ABC sister soap General Hospital. Wanting to spare Larry the pain of watching her die, Meredith runs away to San Francisco and leaves him a "Dear John" letter claiming she no longer loves him. Depressed, Larry confides in his former accuser, Karen.

=== Star-crossed lovers ===
Larry (Michael Storm) and Meredith (Benesch), 1971

In 1969, Karen saves Larry (now played by his previous portrayer Jim Storm's brother, Michael Storm) from a fire that left his face badly burned, and nurses him back to health, with them becoming very close. When he recovers from his injuries and reconstructive facial surgery, they consummate their relationship. This was the first time a soap opera took the plastic surgery route to explain away the different face of a recast, a ruse that would be used many times over the years on all soaps, and used twice more on One Life to Live when recasting the hugely popular original portrayers of Max Holden (James DePaiva) and Todd Manning (Roger Howarth). Meredith (Lynn Benesch onward) returns from California, her condition miraculously improved. Larry, upon seeing her again, hopes for a reconciliation. The two eventually get back together, much to Victor's ire. Days later, however, Karen tells Larry that she is pregnant. He breaks the news to Meredith and then marries Karen to prevent her from having a dangerous and potentially fatal back-alley abortion. The character of Pat Matthews (Susan Trustman) on Another World had the soaps' first abortion in 1964, and suffered the consequence of sterility, until she underwent a procedure and was then able to conceive. Abortion was still illegal in the United States in 1969 when the character of Karen Martin was pregnant, and would remain so until Roe v Wade in 1973, when the All My Children character Erica Kane (Susan Lucci) would undergo the first legal soap opera abortion the same year (though it was retconned 32 years later). The usual soap opera solution to a single woman's pregnancy was to have her get married, as unwed motherhood was not widely accepted by the viewing public until decades later.

A heartbroken Meredith meets an amnesiac whom she calls Tom Edwards (Joseph Gallison). Victor invites Meredith to take him in at Llanfair. Falling for Tom, whose identity is uncovered to be Bruce McKenzie, the two become engaged, with Victor's approval. Karen miscarries in 1970, leading to a divorce from Larry, and she leaves town. He soon resumes his courtship of Meredith, despite her recent engagement. Bruce, whom she still calls "Tom", sees her desire to be with Larry, and breaks it off with her. Meredith and Larry soon marry on the terrace of Llanfair on June 25, 1970, with Viki as maid of honor and a begrudging Victor giving away the bride.

Settling into marriage, Meredith insists they should have a baby to complete their happiness. Larry is against it, worrying that her illness, which is in remission, could return. She soon convinces him, and quickly becomes pregnant with twins. In 1971, after months of bed rest, she gives birth to a son named Daniel and a stillborn daughter. She falls into post-partum depression and deep grief for Danny's dead twin sister. Larry calls in Dr. Joyce Brothers, who played herself, to help his wife through her grief. This celebrity cameo was another soap opera first for One Life to Live, and would be increasingly common for all soaps in years to come.

In August 1973, thieves break into Llanfair to steal Victor's valuable art collection. They take Meredith, plus Larry's auto mechanic brother, Vinny (Antony Ponzini), hostage. After days of crisis negotiations with Lt. Ed Hall (Al Freeman, Jr.) of the fictitious Llanview Police Department, Vinny and Meredith attempt to escape from the garage where they are being held. Meredith stumbles, falls, and hits her head when one of the gunmen shoves her. She suffers massive brain trauma on the August 8, 1973, episode, but before succumbing to her injuries tells Viki (Erika Slezak onward) to tell Larry how happy he made her. Lynn Benesch as Meredith briefly returns in 1987, for scenes when Viki has a near-death experience and goes to Heaven.

== Public impact ==
The featured character's name "Meredith", a Welsh name meaning "magnificent lord", became an increasingly popular baby name in the United States in the immediate years following the One Life to Live premiere in 1968, with the show credited for the uptick in usage.
