= Jennifer Harmon =

American actress (1943–2026)

- Born: December 3, 1943; Pasadena, California, US
- Died: May 9, 2026 (aged 82); New York City, U.S.
- Occupation: Actress
- Years active: 1965–2010

Jennifer Harmon (December 3, 1943 – May 9, 2026) was an American actress who mostly appeared on Broadway and television soap operas. She was lead actress in the NBC soap opera, How to Survive a Marriage (1974–75) and later played villainous Cathy Craig in the ABC soap opera, One Life to Live (1976–78). For this performance, Harmon received Daytime Emmy Award for Outstanding Lead Actress in a Drama Series nomination in 1978.

== Life and career ==
Harmon made her Broadway debut in 1965, appearing in You Can't Take It With You. Her other Broadway credits include The School for Scandal, Right You Are If You Think You Are, We, Comrades Three, The Wild Duck, The Cherry Orchard, The Show-Off, Blithe Spirit, The Sisters Rosensweig, The Little Foxes, The Deep Blue Sea, Amy's View, The Dinner Party, The Glass Menagerie, Seascape, Barefoot in the Park, Dividing the Estate and Other Desert Cities.

She returned to One Life to Live in 1991 playing Victoria Lord's attorney for multiple episodes and the same year played Jean Weatherill on Guiding Light. In 1995, she played Lucretia Jones on the ABC soap opera, Loving. Harmon also guest-starred on Madigan, Barnaby Jones, Dallas, St. Elsewhere, Homicide: Life on the Street, The Cosby Mysteries, Law & Order, Oz, and The Good Wife. She also starred in 21 episodes of the CBS Radio Mystery Theater, which ran from January of 1974 to December of 1982.

Jennifer Harmon died in New York City on May 9, 2026, at the age of 82.

== Filmography ==
=== Film ===
Year	Title	Role
1988	Astonished	Sonia's Mother
1996	'M' Word	Jan
1999	The Tavern	Ronnie's Mother

=== Television ===
Year	Title	Role	Notes
1967	Camera Three	Hedwig	Episode: "The APA Rehearses"
1972	Madigan	Janet Lakka	Episode: "The Manhattan Beat"
1974-1975	How to Survive a Marriage	Chris Kirby	334 Episodes
1976-1978	One Life to Live	Cathy Craig Lord #5	113 Episodes
1979	Barnaby Jones	Jane Prescott	Episode: "The Enslaved"
1979	Dallas	Secretary	Episode: The Red File: Part 2
1979	The White Shadow	Nurse	Episode: "Sudden Death"
1981	Standing Room Only	Mrs. Smeedley	Episode: "Sherlock Holmes"
1984	St. Elsewhere	Jogger	Episode "In Sickness and in Health"
1991	Guiding Light	Jean Wetherwill	4 Episodes
1993	Homicide: Life on the Street	Alison Ashley	Episode: "A Shot in the Dark"
1993	Another World	Judge Trullinger	1 Episode
1995	The Cosby Mysteries	Dean Lennox	Episode: "The Hit Parade"
1995	Law & Order	Mrs. Serena Davidson	Episode: "Cruel and Unusual"
1995	Loving	Lucretia Jones	3 Episodes
2003	Oz	Ms. Lang	Episode: "A Failure to Communicate"
2006	Rescue Me	Ellen Turbody	Episode: "Devil"
2010	The Good Wife	Ruth	Episode: "Taking Control"

=== Stage ===
Year	Title	Role	Notes
1965	You Can't Take It With You	Essie	Lyceum Theatre, Broadway
1966	The School for Scandal	Maria	Lyceum Theatre, Broadway
1966	Right You Are If You Think You Are	Dina	Lyceum Theatre, Broadway
1966	We, Comrades Three	Young Woman (Alternate)	Lyceum Theatre, Broadway
1967	The Wild Duck	Hedvig	Lyceum Theatre, Broadway
1967	You Can't Take It With You	Essie (Alternate)	Lyceum Theatre, Broadway
1967	The Show Off	Amy (Replacement)	Lyceum Theatre, Broadway
1968	The Cherry Orchard	Maid	Lyceum Theatre, Broadway
1987	Blithe Spirit	Elvira/Ruth (Understudy)	Neil Simon Theatre, Broadway
1995	The School for Scandal	Mrs. Candour	Lyceum Theatre, Broadway
1997	The Little Foxes	Birdie Hubbard/Regina Giddens (Understudy)	Vivian Beaumont Theater, Broadway
1998	The Deep Blue Sea	Hester Collyer/Mrs. Elton (Understudy)	Criterion Center Stage Right, Broadway
1999	Amy's View	Esme Allen (Understudy)	Ethel Barrymore Theatre, Broadway
2000	The Dinner Party	Gabrielle Buonocelli/Mariette Levieux (Understudy)	Music Box Theatre, Broadway
2005	The Glass Menagerie	Amanda Wingfield (Understudy)	Ethel Barrymore Theatre, Broadway
2005	Seascape	Nancy (Understudy)	Booth Theatre, Broadway
2006	Barefoot in the Park	Mrs. Banks (Understudy)	Cort Theatre, Broadway
2007	Deuce	Midge Barker (Standby)	Music Box Theatre, Broadway
2008	Dividing the Estate	Lucille/Mary Jo (Understudy)	Booth Theatre, Broadway
2011	Other Desert Cities	Polly Wyeth/Silda Grauman (Understudy)	Booth Theatre, Broadway
