= Tom Fuccello =

American actor

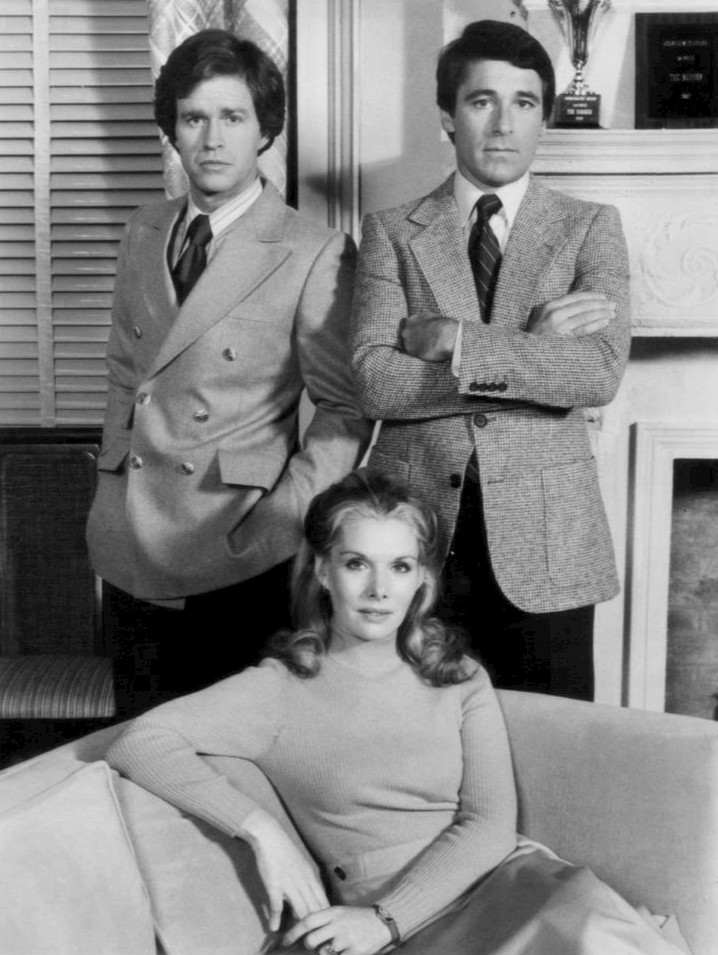
- Tom Fuccello as Paul Kendall (back row, right) on One Life to Live in 1977
- Born: December 11, 1936; Newark, New Jersey, U.S.
- Died: August 16, 1993 (aged 56); Van Nuys, California, U.S.
- Occupation: Actor
- Years active: 1967–1993, his death

Tom Fuccello (December 11, 1936 – August 16, 1993) was an American actor, who was born in Newark, New Jersey.

Initially a theatre actor, Fuccello appeared in Broadway productions of Butterflies Are Free, The Unknown Soldier and His Wife, and Are You Now, or Have You Ever Been? in the 1970s. His first notable screen role was as Mark Elliot in the daytime soap opera, Love is a Many Splendored Thing, from 1972 until its cancellation in 1973. He later portrayed Paul Kendall in the daytime soap opera One Life to Live from 1977 to 1979. He then had a recurring guest role in the hit primetime television series Dallas as Senator Dave Culver from 1979 to 1991. The character was the former stepson of Donna Culver Krebbs who was played by Susan Howard.

His other television appearances include: Knots Landing, Simon & Simon, The Colbys, Falcon Crest, Beverly Hills, 90210 and the television movie Sidney Shorr: A Girl's Best Friend. He also appeared in Rock Hudson in 1990. His last role was in The Young and the Restless in 1992.

Fuccello died in 1993, aged 56 of AIDS.
