= Robert Milli =

American actor (1933–2019)

Robert A. Milli (March 15, 1933 – July 18, 2019) was an American television actor.

== Early years ==
Milli was born in Brooklyn, New York, and studied theater at Catholic University and the University of Maryland.

== Career ==
Milli was perhaps best known for his long-running portrayal of Adam Thorpe on the CBS soap Guiding Light, a role he played from 1972 to 1981, briefly reprising the role on numerous occasions during the late 1980s and early 1990s. He originated the role of Dr. Jim Craig on the ABC soap One Life to Live, playing the role from 1968 to 1969, and also appeared on a number of other soaps, including Another World, Somerset, All My Children, and Love is a Many Splendored Thing. He also played Horatio in Richard Burton's Hamlet, and had a small part in Klute. He has also guest starred in the series Spenser for Hire, and Law & Order.

Milli's Broadway credits include The Front Page (1969), A Severed Head (1964), Hamlet (1964), The Rehearsal (1963), Ross (1961), and Write Me a Murder (1961).

== Filmography ==
Year	Title	Role	Notes
1962	The Seducers	Robert Wells	
1964	The Curse of the Living Corpse	Bruce Sinclair	
1964	Hamlet	Horatio	
1971	Klute	Tom Gruneman	
1986	Playing for Keeps	Cromwell	
