= Brynn Thayer =

American actress

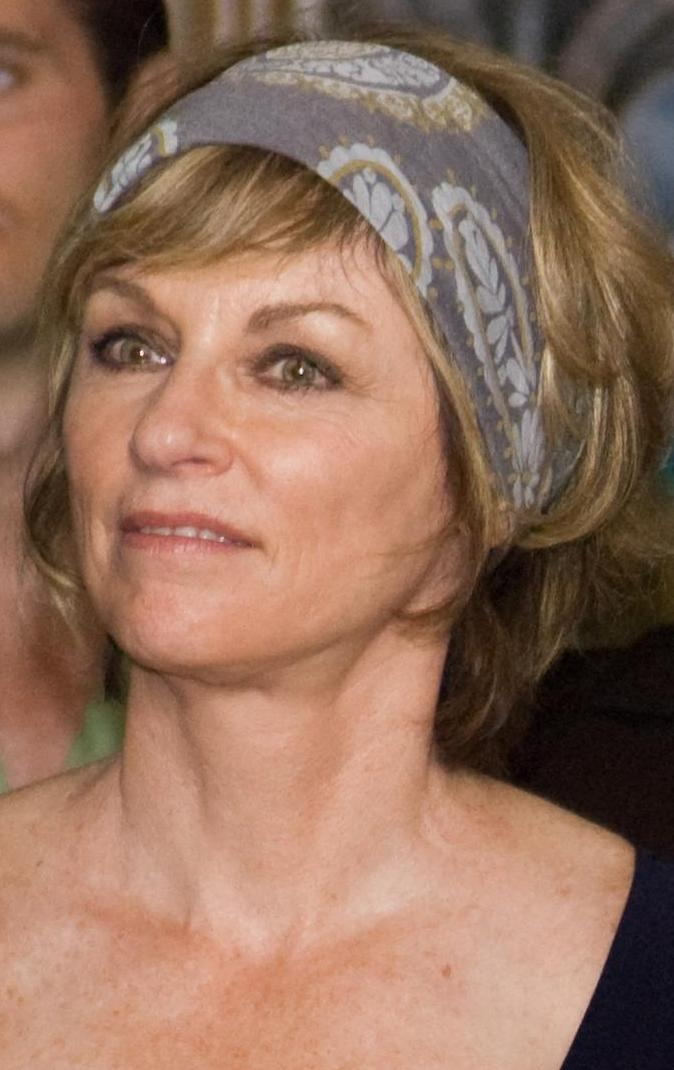
- Thayer in 2008
- Born: October 4, 1949 (age 77); Dallas Texas, U.S.
- Education: Beverly Hills Playhouse
- Occupation: Actress
- Years active: 1978–present
- Known for: One Life to Live; Matlock
- Spouse(s): Hugh Robertson (m. 1971; div. 1973) Gerald Anthony (m. 1981; div. 1983) David Steinberg (m. 1994)
- Father: W. Paul Thayer

Brynn Thayer is an American actress. She is perhaps best known for playing Jenny Wolek on the television soap opera One Life to Live from 1978 to 1986, which earned her a Daytime Emmy Award nomination.

== Career ==
Thayer is well known for her work on television. From 1978 to 1986, she played Jenny Wolek in the ABC daytime soap opera, One Life to Live. Thayer assumed the role in August 1978 amid a contract dispute between Katherine Glass and ABC Daytime.

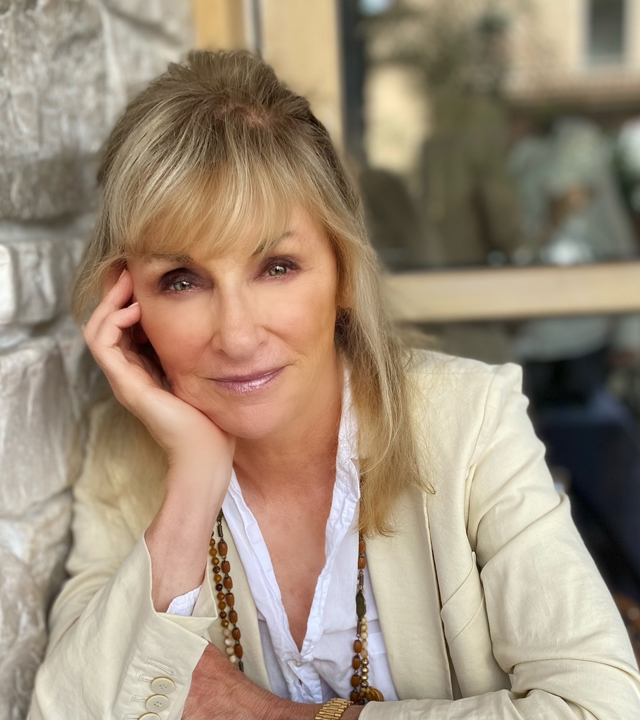
Thayer in 2021

In 1986, Thayer left One Life to Live and began a career on primetime television. She starred in two short-lived dramas for CBS: TV 101 from 1988 to 1989, and Island Son (1989–1990). In 1992, she joined the cast of the ABC legal series Matlock portraying Matlock's daughter, Leanne MacIntyre, and was a regular cast member; she was previously a guest star in the 1991 episode "The Suspect". From 1997-98, she had a regular role in the Pensacola: Wings of Gold.

In film, Thayer co-starred in Hero and the Terror (1988) and Murder in Mexico: The Bruce Beresford-Redman Story (2015). She guest starred in a number of television shows, including Moonlighting; Murder, She Wrote; 7th Heaven; Diagnosis: Murder; JAG; Cold Case; Without a Trace; Castle; and How to Get Away with Murder. She had a recurring role in General Hospital as Kylie Quinlan in 1994. In 2011, she guest starred on Days of Our Lives as Susan Banks. She portrayed the present day version of Lily Specter on Suits, mother of Harvey Specter.

== Personal life ==
Thayer is the daughter of Margery (née Schwartz) and William Paul Thayer, a former naval officer and business executive who was Deputy Secretary of Defense (1983–84) in the Reagan Administration. She studied acting at the Beverly Hills Playhouse acting school.

Thayer co-founded the charitable organization ZazAngels with actor Michael Zaslow and his wife, Susan Hufford, to generate funds for researching amyotrophic lateral sclerosis (ALS or Lou Gehrig's disease). Zaslow died of ALS on December 6, 1998.
