= Patricia Roe =

American actress (1928–2005)

- Born: September 18, 1928; New York City, New York U.S.
- Died: May 18, 2005 (aged 76); New York City, New York, U.S.
- Occupation: Actress
- Years active: 1943–1981

Patricia Roe (September 18, 1928 – May 18, 2005), later known as Patricia Roe Bell, was an American actress, best known for her work in Broadway theatre and in the soap operas The Guiding Light (Sara McIntyre) and One Life to Live (Eileen Riley Siegel). Roe was married to radio actor Ralph Bell. Roe Bell died in New York City on May 18, 2005, at the age of 76.
