= Vince Wolek =

- One Life to Live character
- Antony Ponzini as Vince Wolek
- Portrayed by: Antony Ponzini (1968–75, 1987); Jordan Charney (1975–77); Michael Ingram (1977–81)
- Duration: 1968–81; 1987
- First appearance: July 15, 1968
- Last appearance: April 1987
- Created by: Agnes Nixon
- Introduced by: Doris Quinlan
In-universe information
- Other names: Vinny Wolek
- Occupation: Auto mechanic; Detective
- Family: Wolek
- Siblings: Anna Wolek; Larry Wolek
- Spouse: Wanda Webb (1975–81)
- Nephews: Daniel Wolek
- Nieces: Cathy Craig (adoptive)

Vince Wolek is a fictional character from the American soap opera, One Life to Live. Actor Antony Ponzini originated the role from the debut episode in 1968 through 1975, and briefly reappeared in 1987.

== Casting ==
Vincent was created by series creator Agnes Nixon, who cast Antony Ponzini in the role which debuted on the first episode of the serial July 15, 1968. Ponzini went on to play the role for over seven years, leaving the role in November 1975. Upon Ponzini's exit, executive producer Doris Quinlan recast Vincent to Jordan Charney, who played the role from November 1975 through 1977. Michael Ingram became the third actor to play Vincent, from 1977 through 1981. Ponzini returned to the role briefly during a storyline involving Viki having a near-death experience of going to Heaven in 1987.

== Storylines ==
=== Enter Vinny ===
Victoria Lord (Erika Slezak) and Vince (Ponzini) in 1972

In 1968, Vince (Ponzini) falls in love with fun-loving party girl Niki Smith (Gillian Spencer); little does he know that "Niki" was a symptom of the multiple personality disorder suffered by media heiress Victoria "Viki" Lord—the girlfriend of Vince's best friend and reporter Joe Riley (Lee Patterson). Eventually Vince learns the truth and, though heartbroken, tells Viki about her alter ego. Viki seeks medical treatment and proceeds to marry Joe in June 1969. During the wedding in June 1969, Niki reemerges and flees the ceremony with an ecstatic Vince. When Vince urges Niki to marry him, Niki's panic results in Viki regaining control and marries Joe.

In 1970, Vince unwittingly becomes involved with the Llanview drug trade, becoming soon implicated in a drug-related murder. He is eventually cleared of wrongdoing, but not before Joe, investigating Llanview's increasing drug problem for The Banner, is presumed dead after apparently driving off a cliff in California. Vince and Joe's sister Eileen Riley Siegel (Patricia Roe) refuse to give up the hope Joe is alive, and were upset when Viki (Erika Slezak onward) signs papers declaring Joe dead in 1972 to marry Steve Burke (Bernie Grant). Vince and Eileen (Alice Hirson onward) are both vindicated when Joe reappears before Viki's wedding to Steve.

=== Later life and Wanda ===
After leaving briefly, Vince returns to Llanview ill and is nursed back to health by sassy tell-it-like-it-is waitress Wanda Webb (Marilyn Chris). By the time Joe and Viki reunite in 1973, Vince becomes a police officer for the Llanview Police Department; that year during an investigation with Lt. Ed Hall (Al Freeman, Jr.), Vince and sister-in-law Meredith Lord Wolek (Lynn Benesch) are held hostage at Llanfair carriage house for the prized art collection of Victor Lord (Ernest Graves). Meredith dies after suffering a concussion while she and Vince attempted an escape. Vince soon falls in love with Wanda, and the two marry on Valentine's Day 1975.

Ponzini soon departed the series. Actor Jordan Charney assumed the part and character, becoming more of a canvas, supporting role. Vince (Ingram) is later poisoned by the adoptive father of Tina Lord, Ted Clayton (Mark Goddard), July 9, 1981.

Vince (Ponzini) last appears when Viki visits Heaven in April 1987.
