= Nat Polen =

American TV actor

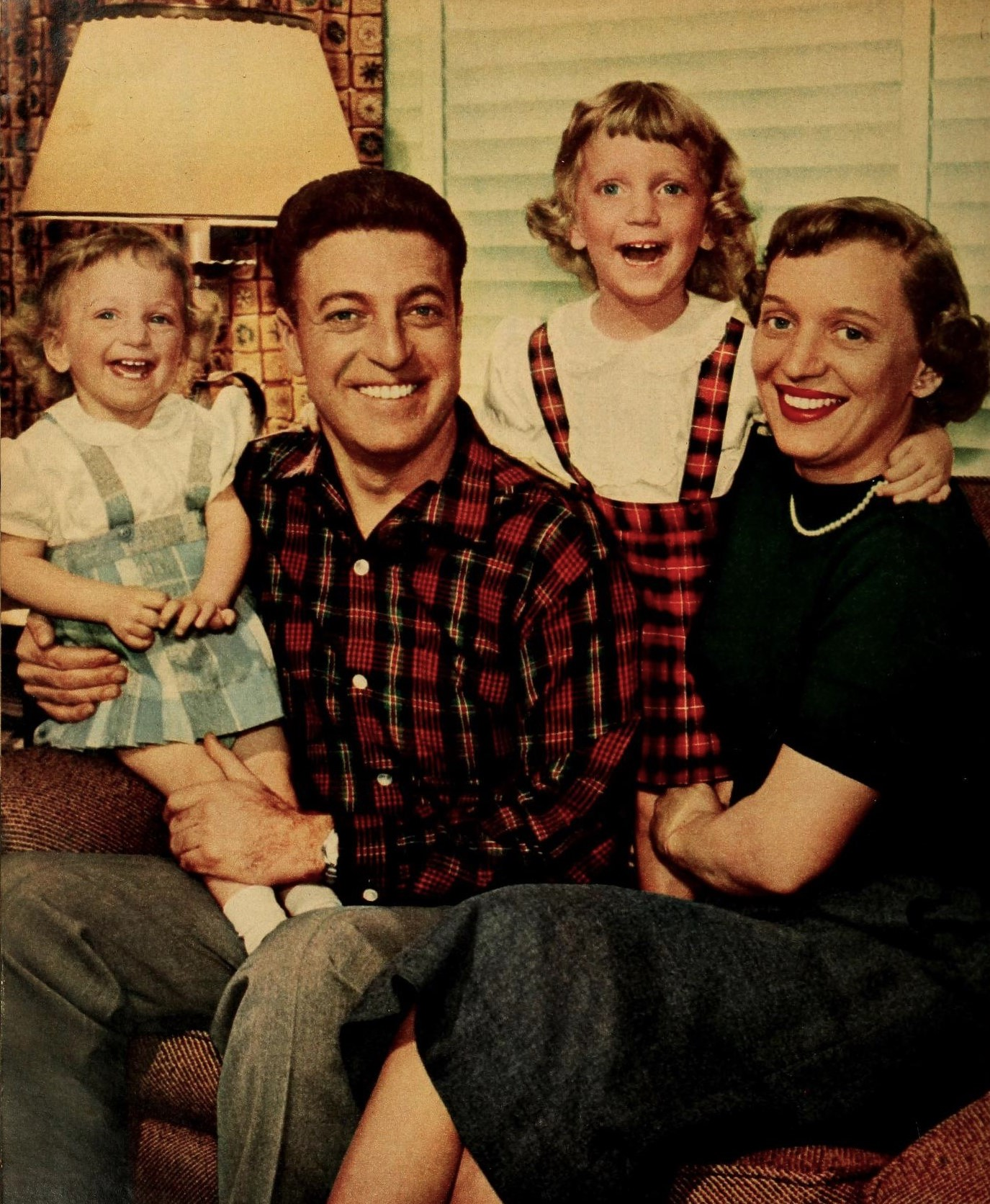
- Nat Polen with his family in 1953
- Born: Nathan Polen; June 14, 1914; Brooklyn, New York City, New York, U.S.
- Died: May 3, 1981 (aged 66); Plainview, New York, U.S.
- Occupation: Actor
- Years active: 1949–1981
- Spouse(s): Nancy Polen (m. 1941)
- Children: 3

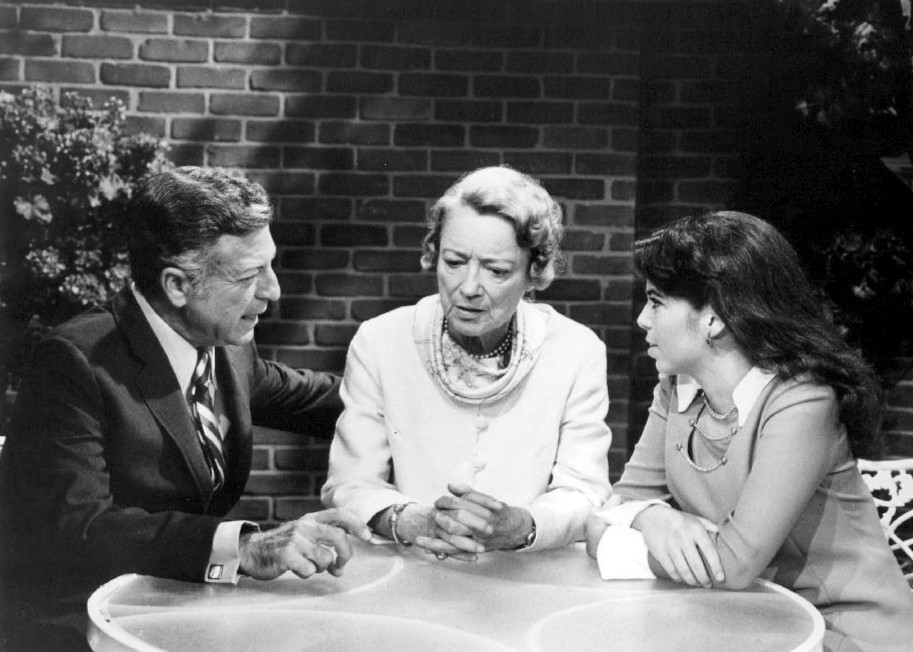
Cast of One Life to Live, L-R: Nat Polen, Peggy Wood, and Amy Levitt

Nathan Polen (June 14, 1914 – May 3, 1981) was an American television actor known for his long-running character roles playing physicians on ABC and CBS soap operas.

== Early years ==
Born in Brooklyn, Polen was the middle child of three, born to Russian-born parents Jack and Bertha Polen. His father was a singer and stage performer who appeared in a 1915 production of Oskar Nedbal's operetta, The Peasant Girl, and later served under Josiah Zuro as assistant stage manager for New York City's Free Open Air Opera at Ebbets Field.

Polen attended Thomas Jefferson High School, graduating in 1931. He studied drama at New York University, the American National Theater and Academy, and the Guild School of Drama. While he was at NYU he formed a dance band. Limited facilities at the university caused the band to play in hotels, which led to Polen's gaining a reputation among professional musicians as "a solid young drummer".

== Career ==
=== Music ===
Polen was a drummer before he became an actor. He began playing for bands in 1936, and in 1941 he was the 11th best jazz drummer in a poll conducted by DownBeat magazine. After a hiatus while he served in the Navy from 1942 to 1946, he played for CBS, including performing as part of the CBS Symphony Orchestra. In 1947, his interests turned to acting, as he declined jobs with Benny Goodman and Woody Herman in favor of acting on radio.

=== Acting ===
Polen had a continuing role on the Charlie Chan radio series. Other radio programs on which he acted included Columbia Workshop and The FBI in Peace and War.

Polen played Dr. Doug Cassen on As the World Turns for over 9 years, from April 1957 until October 1966. He then played Ephraim Webster on The Edge of Night and Dr. John Crager on the ABC afternoon version of The Nurses. He later became second acor to portray Dr. Jim Craig on One Life to Live from 1969 until shortly before his death from pancreatic cancer in 1981. He was also a film actor, playing Lt. Reilly in the 1972 film Across 110th Street. Other credits include appearing in 37 episodes of CBS Radio Mystery Theatre.

On Broadway Polen portrayed Colonel Egan in Blood, Sweat and Stanley Poole (1961).

=== Community activities ===
Polen was involved with supervision of activities for teenagers in East Norwich, New York, where he and his family lived. He directed plays at Oyster Bay High School, and the Board of Education there created the annual Nat Polen Scholarship Award to honor him.

== Personal life and death ==
Married in 1941, Polen and his wife, Nancy, had three daughters.

On May 3, 1981, aged 66, Polen died of pancreatic cancer at Central Regional Hospital in Plainview, New York.

== Filmography ==
Year	Title	Role	Notes
1968	What's So Bad About Feeling Good?		Uncredited
1972	Across 110th Street	Lt. Reilly	
1979	Boardwalk	Dr. Rothbart	(final film role)
