= Joe Riley (One Life to Live) =

- One Life to Live character
- Portrayed by: Lee Patterson
- Duration: 1968–70; 1972–79; 1987
- First appearance: July 15, 1968
- Last appearance: April 1987
- Created by: Agnes Nixon
- Introduced by: Doris Quinlan; Paul Rauch (1987)
In-universe information
- Other names: Joseph Francis Riley
- Occupation: Journalist; Editor-in-chief
- Family: Riley
- Brothers: Tom Dennison
- Sisters: Eileen Riley Siegel
- Spouse: Victoria Lord (1969–70, 1974–79)
- Sons: Kevin Lord Riley; Joe Riley Jr.
- Daughters: Megan Craig Riley
- Grandsons: Duke Buchanan; Kevin Buchanan, Jr.; (stillborn)
- Nephews: Tim Siegel
- Nieces: Julie Siegel; Mari Lynn Dennison

Joe Riley is a fictional character from the ABC soap opera One Life to Live originated on the debut episode by actor Lee Patterson. Patterson regularly appeared in the role from the inception of the serial July 15, 1968, through 1970, from 1972 through October 3, 1979, and briefly in 1987.

== Casting ==
"Doing a serial is a tough business and requires high competence. It’s not for inexperienced actors. You’ve got little time for preparation and you’ve got to get it right the first time!"

— Lee Patterson on soap operas, Daytime TV magazine

Series creator Agnes Nixon cast Patterson as one of the leading protagonists on One Life to Live in 1968. After two seasons with the show, Patterson departed the role in 1970, filming Chato's Land opposite Jack Palance and making guest television appearances including on ABC's The Immortal during his absence from the serial. The actor reprised the role on-contract with the series in 1972, playing Joe until the character's onscreen death October 3, 1979. In 1986, Patterson returned to One Life to Live in the contract role of Joe's long-lost twin brother, Tom Dennison. The actor made his final appearances on the series as Joe in episodic dream sequences aired in March and April 1987.

== Storylines ==
Joe and Viki (Erika Slezak) remarry, 1974

In 1968, reporter Joe Riley clashes with icy heiress Victoria "Viki" Lord (originally Gillian Spencer), who had little interest in romance and focused her time and energy on her work at The Banner. They soon start to fall in love, but publisher Victor Lord (Ernest Graves) disapproves of his daughter becoming involved with the working-class Riley and does all he can to keep them apart. Torn between pleasing her father and following her heart, Viki begins getting headaches — and mysterious, threatening notes telling her to end her relationship with Joe.

Secretly plagued by multiple personality disorder, Viki (as alter ego "Niki Smith") becomes involved with Joe's best friend, Vince Wolek (Antony Ponzini). In love with "Niki", a heartbroken Vinny learns the truth and told Viki about her other personality. Viki seeks psychiatric treatment, and with her mental illness apparently under control, goes ahead with plans to marry Joe. But during the initial wedding ceremony, "Niki" reemerges and flees the ceremony with an ecstatic Vinny. When Vince urges "Niki" to marry him, however, "Niki's" own panic resulted in Viki regaining control, and Viki returns to Joe. During more intensive therapy, Viki remembers apparently writing the threatening notes as "Niki", and finally recalls the childhood memory that had apparently caused her personality to splinter. Now freed by the truth, Viki marries Joe December 11, 1969.

In 1970, Joe begins investigating Llanview's increasing drug trade for The Banner. While making inquiries in California, Joe's car goes over a cliff and his body is never found, so he is presumed dead. A devastated Viki (Erika Slezak 1971 onward), at the insistence of her father Victor, signs papers declaring Joe legally dead in 1972, a move which shocks Vince and Joe's sister Eileen Riley Siegel (Alice Hirson), both of whom refuse to believe Joe to be dead. Joe Riley reappears in 1972 as Viki was marrying another man, new Banner editor Steve Burke (Bernie Grant). When Viki and Steve return from their honeymoon, she receives the news of Joe's survival of the accident and return to Llanview, promptly fainting. In love with (and married to) two different men, Viki eventually chooses to remain loyal to Steve in 1973.

Heartbroken and still in love with Viki, Joe takes up with Cathy Craig (Dorrie Kavanaugh), who bears him a daughter, Megan, in 1974; when Cathy refuses Joe's offer to make an honest woman out of her, Joe and Viki remarry on the episode first-run September 16, 1974. Megan dies in infancy due to a car crash involving stepmother Viki on the episode first-run October 3, 1975, and Viki falls into a coma until December of that year. Joe and Viki remain married, despite countless marital woes, through 1979, bearing their first son, Kevin, on the episode first-run September 12, 1976, who is soon kidnapped by Cathy and found by her volition in 1977. Joe dies of brain tumor with Viki at his side on October 3, 1979, leaving Viki widowed and pregnant; she bears their second son, Joe, Jr., on the episode first-run January 8, 1980.
