= List of One Life to Live characters introduced between 1968–1979 =

This is a list of characters from the ABC Daytime soap opera, One Life to Live, that began their run between the show's pilot episode and the end of 1979.

== Becky Lee Abbott ==
Becky Lee Abbott
- One Life to Live character
- Portrayed by: Jill Voight (1977–1978); Mary Gordon Murray (1979–2001)
- Duration: 1977–1986; 1988; 1996; 1998; 2001
- First appearance: February 1977
- Last appearance: November 19, 2001
- Created by: Gordon Russell
- Introduced by: Doris Quinlan; Paul Rauch (1988); Susan Bedsow Horgan (1996); Jill Farren Phelps (1998); Gary Tomlin (2001)
In-universe information
- Other names: Rebecca Lee Hunt (maiden name)
- Occupation: Singer
- Spouse: Richard Abbott (1978–81); Asa Buchanan (1983–1985); Jesse Wilde (1986–present)
- Children: Drew Buchanan

Becky Lee Abbott is a fictional character on the ABC Daytime soap opera One Life to Live. The role was originated by Jill Voight in February 1977, a role she played through December 1978. Mary Gordon Murray stepped into the role in August 1979 and played Becky until May 1985. Murray later made several guest appearances in 1986, 1988, 1996, 1998 and from November 15 to 19, 2001.

When Becky Lee was first shown, she was an aspiring country-and-Western singer. She was later signed to the record company owned by Asa Buchanan. Her first husband had been Luke Jackson, and she later married Richard Abbott. She and fellow singer Johnny Drummond often worked together. She became attracted to Bo Buchanan, and they conceived a son. Bo would not marry her, so Bo's father Asa Buchanan married her.

Becky later had amnesia, and she met the Wilde family in the mountains.

== Pat Ashley ==
Pat Ashley
- One Life to Live character
- Portrayed by: Jacqueline Courtney
- Duration: 1975–1983
- First appearance: April 1975
- Last appearance: December 1983
- Created by: Agnes Nixon; Gordon Russell
- Introduced by: Doris Quinlan
In-universe information
- Other names: Patricia Ashley (maiden name); Pat Kendall
- Occupation: Journalist; Reporter for The Banner; TV host of The View in Llanview
- Parents: Martin Ashley; Helena Ashley
- Siblings: Maggie Ashley
- Spouse: Paul Kendall (pre-1975–1979); Adam Brewster (1979); Tony Lord (1982–1983)
- Children: Brian Kendall

Patricia "Pat" Ashley Lord (formerly Kendall and Brewster) is a fictional character on the ABC Daytime soap opera One Life to Live. The role was played by actress Jacqueline Courtney from the character's inception in April 1975 continually through its onscreen departure in December 1983.

Pat was the twin sister of Maggie Ashley (also played by Jacqueline Courtney) and the daughter of Helena Ashley (played by Augusta Dabney). Her son, Brian Austin, was the illegitimate son of Tony Lord and the grandson of Victor Lord. Brian was later killed.

Pat dated Clint Buchanan, Bo Buchanan, and Adam Brewster.

== Steve Burke ==
Steve Burke
- One Life to Live character
- Portrayed by: Bernard Grant
- Duration: 1970–1975
- First appearance: August 1970
- Last appearance: 1975
- Created by: Agnes Nixon
- Introduced by: Doris Quinlan
In-universe information
- Occupation: Journalist; Editor for The Banner
- Spouse: Victoria Lord (1972–1974)

Steven "Steve" Burke is a fictional character on the ABC Daytime soap opera One Life to Live. The role was originated by actor Bernard Grant in August 1970, who played the character continually through 1975.

== Herb Callison ==
Herb Callison
- One Life to Live character
- Portrayed by: Anthony Call
- Duration: 1979–1993
- First appearance: March 2, 1979
- Last appearance: December 22, 1993
- Created by: Gordon Russell; Sam Hall
- Introduced by: Joseph Stuart
In-universe information
- Occupation: Lawyer
- Spouse: Dorian Cramer (1981–1985)
- Adoptive children: Cassie Callison
- Grandchildren: River Carpenter (adoptive)

Herbert "Herb" Callison is a fictional character on the ABC Daytime soap opera One Life to Live. The character was played by actor Anthony Call from its inception in 1979 through its last regular appearance in 1992. Call reprised the role in 1993.

Herb gains notoriety (and a friend in Dorian Lord) upon serving as the Llanview District Attorney during the Marco Dane murder trial against Victoria "Viki" Lord Riley. Viki who was ultimately acquitted, and which resulted in the shocking revelation that Karen Wolek was a prostitute involved with client and actual murderer Talbot Huddleston.

Upon marrying Dorian at Llanfair in 1981, he adopts her daughter Cassie Reynolds, who soon takes her stepfather's surname as he adopts her. Herb and Dorian divorce in 1985, though the two remain close friends. Herb departs fictional Llanview in 1992, returning briefly for Christmas episodes in December 1993.

== Melinda Cramer ==
Melinda Cramer
- One Life to Live character
- Portrayed by: Patricia Pearcy (1973–1974); Jane Badler (1978–1981, 1983); Sharon Gabet (1987–1989); Nicole Orth-Pallavicini (1997, 2004); Christiana Anbri (1997–1998)
- Duration: 1973–1974; 1978–1981; 1983; 1987–1989; 1997–1998; 2004
- First appearance: April 30, 1973
- Last appearance: August 2, 2004
- Created by: Agnes Nixon; Gordon Russell
- Introduced by: Doris Quinlan; Joseph Stuart (1978); Paul Rauch (1987); Jill Farren Phelps (1997); Frank Valentini (2004)
In-universe information
- Occupation: Pianist; Talk show host
- Family: Cramer
- Parents: Lou Cramer; Sonya Roskova
- Siblings: Dorian Cramer; Addie Cramer
- Spouse: Peter Janssen (1978–1981)
- Children: Kelly Cramer; Paul Cramer
- Grandchildren: Zane Buchanan
- Aunts and uncles: Betsy Cramer
- Nieces and nephews: Blair Cramer; Cassie Callison; Adriana Cramer; Langston Wilde (adoptive)

Melinda Cramer is a fictional character on the ABC Daytime soap opera One Life to Live. The character debuted on April 30, 1973, with leading series antagonist Dr. Dorian Cramer. She last appeared onscreen on August 2, 2004, and died off-screen February 28, 2010.

Sisters Melinda and Dorian arrive in fictional Llanview in 1973. Mentally disturbed Melinda stabs Dorian's lover, Mark Toland, in 1974, leading to her institutionalization.

A recovered Melinda returns to Llanview in 1978, but soon sabotages Dorian's new relationship with Dr. Peter Janssen, wanting him for herself. Melinda seems to win when she and Peter elope, but her obsessive-compulsive behavior returns. Resuming her career as a concert pianist, Melinda practices day and night, putting a strain on her marriage to Peter. She becomes more unbalanced when a failed audition put a close to her musical ambitions. In 1979, Melinda checks herself into the Compton Clinic. Dorian then has Melinda declared mentally incompetent; by 1980, Peter hopes to marry Jenny Wolek Vernon, but couldn't divorce Melinda until she was mentally stable. After threatening Jenny with a letter opener and sinking further into psychosis, Melinda returns to the clinic in 1981. She is seen again briefly in 1983, as Herb Callison visits her in order to learn the truth about Dorian's past with David Reynolds.

Melinda returns again in 1987 after Dorian's departure, and moves into Dorian's penthouse with Dorian's daughter Cassie Callison. Melinda witnesses the murder of mobster Alec Crown by Dr. Donald Lamarr and testifies against him. She gets a job working at the Banner, and helps solve several criminal activities in Llanview. Melinda has a relationship with Jon Russell, and leaves town herself in 1989.

It is later discovered that Melinda has returned to living in a sanitarium, now in California. Her daughter Kelly Cramer moves to Llanview in 1995. Melinda herself returns to Llanview in 1997, briefly, before leaving once again, choosing to return to the sanitarium.

In 2004, her daughter Kelly visits her while she is now living in Boston, in a different sanitarium.

On March 1, 2010, Cassie returns to Llanview to inform Dorian of Melinda's offscreen death. Although the Cramer family originally believed Mitch Laurence and Allison Perkins to be the culprits of Melinda's death, it was later revealed that Elijah Clarke, the husband of her niece Blair, actually was responsible for her death. According to him, she had recognized him from a photograph in the newspaper, and threatened to warn her niece about his murderous past.

== Greg Huddleston ==
Greg Huddleston
- One Life to Live character
- Portrayed by: Paul Joynt
- Duration: 1977–1979
- First appearance: 1977
- Last appearance: April 1979
- Created by: Gordon Russell
- Introduced by: Doris Quinlan
In-universe information
- Parents: Talbot Huddleston
- Grandparents: Adele Huddleston

Gregory "Greg" Huddleston is a fictional character on the ABC Daytime soap opera One Life to Live. The role was played by Paul Joynt from 1977 until his final appearance in April 1979.

Greg is Tina Clayton's first boyfriend. His parents are Talbot and Adelle Huddleston.

== Talbot Huddleston ==
Talbot Huddleston
- One Life to Live character
- Portrayed by: Byron Sanders
- Duration: 1977–1979
- First appearance: May 1977
- Last appearance: April 1979
- Created by: Gordon Russell
- Introduced by: Doris Quinlan
In-universe information
- Occupation: Businessman
- Parents: Adele Huddleston
- Children: Greg Huddleston

Talbot Huddleston is a fictional character on the ABC Daytime soap opera One Life to Live. The role was played by actor Byron Sanders onscreen from May 1977 until April 1979.

A wealthy businessman, Talbot engages in affair with married call girl Karen Wolek. On January 16, 1978, Talbot accidentally ran over and killed Brian Kendall after learned his birth father was Tony Lord, not Paul Kendall. He is arrested on manslaughter charges and last appears in 1979.

Talbot was the father of Greg Huddleston (played by Paul Joynt), the first boyfriend of Tina Clayton. Talbot's wife was the alcoholic Adelle Huddleston (played by Lori March).

== Peter Janssen ==
Peter Janssen
- One Life to Live character
- Portrayed by: Jeff Pomerantz (1976–1979, 1987); Robert Burton (1980); Denny Albee (1980–1982)
- Duration: 1976–1982; 1987
- First appearance: January 1976
- Last appearance: April 1987
- Created by: Gordon Russell
- Introduced by: Doris Quinlan
In-universe information
- Occupation: Physician at Llanview Hospital
- Spouse: Melinda Cramer (1978–81); Jenny Wolek (1981–82)

Dr. Peter Janssen is a fictional character on the ABC Daytime serial One Life to Live. The role was originated and notably played by actor Jeff Pomerantz, who appeared in the role January 1976 through 1979 and again in 1987. Robert Burton stepped into the role in January 1980 and was subsequently replaced by Denny Albee. Albee appeared onscreen November 12, 1980 through the character's death May 20, 1982.

Dr. Peter Jansen was the third husband of Jenny Wolek, R. N.

== Katrina Karr ==
Katrina Karr
- One Life to Live character
- Portrayed by: Nancy Snyder
- Duration: 1979–1983
- First appearance: February 1979
- Last appearance: 1983
- Created by: Gordon Russell
- Introduced by: Joseph Stuart
In-universe information
- Occupation: Sex worker
- Children: Kristine Karr

Katrina Karr is a fictional character on the ABC Daytime soap opera One Life to Live. The colleague of fellow prostitute Karen Wolek, role was portrayed onscreen by actress Nancy Snyder from February 1979 until 1983.

Katrina later leaves her life of prostitution and moves into the boarding house owned and operated by Ina Hopkins. She and Marcello Salta dated.

== Kristine Karr ==
Regan McManus (1981–83)

Kristine Karr
- One Life to Live character
- Duration: 1979–1983
- First appearance: November 1, 1979
- Last appearance: 1983
- Created by: Gordon Russell
- Introduced by: Joseph Stuart
In-universe information
- Other names: Mary Vernon
- Parents: Brad Vernon; Katrina Karr
- Grandparents: Will Vernon; Naomi Vernon
- Aunts and uncles: Samantha Vernon
- First cousins: Sammi Garretson

Kristine Karr (born Mary Vernon) is a fictional character on the ABC Daytime soap opera One Life to Live that appeared onscreen from November 1, 1979, until 1983.

Brad Vernon engages in an extramarital affair with prostitute Katrina Karr. Katrina conceives a daughter, born the same night as his stillborn daughter to his wife, Jenny Wolek Vernon, onscreen November 1, 1979 at Llanview Hospital. Con man Marco Dane elicits Jenny's sister Karen Wolek to switch Jenny's dead child with Katrina's baby. Katrina long believes her live-born child died in the nursery of the hospital, while Jenny raises a child she and Brad name Mary Vernon. After nearly three years of deception, Karen and Marco tell Jenny the truth about the two children, and Jenny returns Mary Vernon to Katrina. Katrina soon renames the child Kristine Karr, and departs offscreen with the child in 1983.

Con woman Aubrey Wentworth appears in fictional Llanview in 2010, marrying Joey Riley Buchanan, the son of town businesswoman Victoria "Viki" Lord Banks and her deceased former husband Joe Riley born mere months after Kristine Karr. Aubrey reveals onscreen her name, "Aubrey Wentworth," to be an alias for her real name Kristine Karr. As leading Karen Wolek portrayer Judith Light declined to appear on the ABC Daytime finale of OLTL, Aubrey's possible identity as the Kristine Karr born to Katrina and Brad was not divulged onscreen, and Aubrey last appears in December 2011.

== Brian Kendall ==
Brian Kendall
- One Life to Live character
- Portrayed by: Steve Austin
- Duration: 1975–1978
- First appearance: April 1975
- Last appearance: January 18, 1978
- Created by: Agnes Nixon; Gordon Russell
- Introduced by: Doris Quinlan
In-universe information
- Other names: Brian Lord
- Occupation: Student in Llanview
- Family: Lord
- Parents: Tony Lord; Pat Ashley
- Stepparents: Paul Kendall
- Grandparents: Victor Lord; Dorothy Randolph; Martin Ashley; Helena Ashley
- Aunts and uncles: Victoria Lord; Meredith Lord; Tina Lord; Todd Manning; Victor Lord, Jr.; Margaret Ashley
- First cousins: Megan Gordon; Daniel Wolek; Kevin Riley Buchanan; Joey Riley Buchanan; Jessica Buchanan; Natalie Buchanan; C. J. Roberts; Sarah Roberts; Starr Manning; Danielle Manning; Jack Manning; Sam Manning

Brian Kendall is introduced as the eight-year-old son of new Banner reporter Patricia "Pat" Ashley (Jacqueline Courtney) in 1975. Shortly after his introduction, Pat reveals to new boss Victoria "Viki" Lord Riley (Erika Slezak) that her son is, in fact, Viki's nephew and the son of Viki's maternal cousin and newly uncovered brother, Anthony "Tony" Harris Lord (George Reinholt). As Pat and Tony become romantically involved, Brian grows to greatly despise her mother's new beau as he pined for his late father Paul Kendall (Tom Fuccello), who apparently died before Brian and his mother relocated to Llanview.

On the episode first-run January 16, after years of speculation, mother Pat confirms Brian's worst suspicions — that Tony is his natural father; revealed out in the streets of the busy Llanview town square by Pat and Tony (Philip MacHale), a devastated Brian runs out into the street, where he is accidentally hit in a car driven by married businessman Talbot Huddleston in the company of his call girl, also married Karen Wolek (Judith Light). Panicked that their romantic indiscretions would be uncovered, Talbot and Karen decidedly drive away, leaving a severely injured Brian on the road to succumb to injuries. Brian quietly dies without regaining consciousness in Llanview Hospital, mother Pat at his side.

== Paul Kendall ==
Paul Kendall
- One Life to Live character
- Portrayed by: Tom Fuccello
- Duration: 1977–1979
- First appearance: August 1977
- Last appearance: March 1979
- Created by: Gordon Russell
- Introduced by: Joseph Stuart
In-universe information
- Spouse: Pat Ashley (pre-1975–1979)
- Stepchildren: Brian Kendall

Paul Kendall is a fictional character on the ABC Daytime soap opera One Life to Live. The role was played by actor Tom Fuccello from October 1977 until its onscreen departure in March 1979.

== Edwina Lewis ==
Edwina Lewis
- One Life to Live character
- Portrayed by: Margaret Klenck
- Duration: 1977–1984
- First appearance: July 1977
- Last appearance: November 1984
- Created by: Gordon Russell
- Introduced by: Joseph Stuart
In-universe information
- Other names: Journalist; Reporter for The Banner
- Spouse: Marco Dane (1980–1981, 1983–198?)

Edwina Lewis (formerly Dane) is a fictional character on the ABC Daytime soap opera One Life to Live. The role was played by actress Margaret Klenck from July 1977 until November 1984.

Edwina was a young reporter hired by Joe Riley to work at The Banner. She had really followed Richard Abbott there after he had been hired to work for The Banner. Edwina was romantically obsessed with Richard, who met and began dating aspiring country-and-Western singer Becky Lee Hunt.

Edwina and Richard's mother, Gwendolyn Lord Abbott, work and conspire as much as they could to break up Richard and Becky Lee.

Later, Edwina became the wife of Marco Dane. Marco learns that Edwina is the natural daughter of Dr. Ivan Kipling, but does not tell Edwina.

Edwina and Marco eventually divorced, and Edwina left Llanview.

== Karen Martin ==
Karen Martin
- One Life to Live character
- Portrayed by: Niki Flacks
- Duration: 1968–1970
- First appearance: July 16, 1968
- Last appearance: 1970
- Created by: Agnes Nixon
- Introduced by: Doris Quinlan
In-universe information
- Occupation: Nurse at Llanview Hospital
- Spouse: Larry Wolek (1969)

Karen Martin is a fictional character on the ABC Daytime soap opera One Life to Live. The role was originated on the show pilot by Niki Flacks July 16, 1968. Flacks continued in the role until the character's last appearance in 1970.

== Gwendolyn Lord ==
Gwendolyn Lord Abbott
- One Life to Live character
- Portrayed by: Joan Copeland
- Duration: 1978–1979
- First appearance: 1978
- Last appearance: 1979
- Created by: Gordon Russell
- Introduced by: Joseph Stuart
In-universe information
- Family: Lord
- Siblings: Clayton-Powell Lord; Victor Lord
- Spouse: Jonathan Abbott (pre-1978)
- Children: Richard Abbott
- Grandparents: Randolph Lord; Virginia Fletcher
- Nieces and nephews: Clayton-Powell Lord II; Victoria Lord; Tony Lord; Meredith Lord; Tina Lord; Todd Manning; Victor Lord, Jr.

Gwendolyn Lord Abbott is a fictional character on the ABC Daytime serial One Life to Live. The role was originated and played by actress Joan Copeland from 1978 through 1979.

== Lana McClain ==
Lana McClain
- One Life to Live character
- Portrayed by: Jacklyn Zeman
- Duration: 1976–1977
- First appearance: September 1976
- Last appearance: November 18, 1977
- Created by: Gordon Russell
- Introduced by: Doris Quinlan
In-universe information
- Occupation: Nurse at Llanview Hospital; Waitress at Tony's Place

Lana McClain is a fictional character on the ABC Daytime soap opera One Life to Live. The character was the first contract soap role for actress Jacklyn Zeman, who became most recognized for long-playing Bobbie Spencer on sister serial General Hospital. Zeman appeared as Lana from September 1976 until the character's death in November 1977, when she was cast two months later for GH by Gloria Monty based on her OLTL performance.

Lana first appears as a waitress at Tony's Place, a diner owned by Tony Lord (George Reinholt). She is soon hit on by womanizer Brad Vernon (Jameson Parker), who dated Jenny Wolek (Katherine Glass) at the time. As Brad carried on a relationship with both, Lana becomes a nurse at Llanview Hospital and reveals her pregnancy with his child in November 1977. A drunken Lana dies after Brad gives her a glass of milk laced with sleeping pills. Brad is soon convicted of manslaughter in Lana's death in January 1978.

== Dorothy Randolph ==
Dorothy Randolph
- One Life to Live character
- First appearance: April 1975
- Last appearance: May 1975
- Created by: Agnes Nixon
- Introduced by: Doris Quinlan
In-universe information
- Siblings: Eugenia Randolph
- Children: Tony Lord
- Grandchildren: Brian Kendall
- Nieces and nephews: Victoria Lord; Meredith Lord

Dorothy Randolph is a fictional character on the ABC Daytime soap opera One Life to Live. The role appeared onscreen in April and May 1975 opposite leading role Mark Toland (Tom Lee Jones).

== Eugenia Randolph Lord ==
Eugenia Randolph Lord
- One Life to Live character
- Portrayed by: Lori March (1987); Natacha Roi (1994–1995)
- Duration: 1969; 1987; 1994–1995
- First appearance: 1969
- Last appearance: 1995
- Created by: Agnes Nixon
- Introduced by: Doris Quinlan
In-universe information
- Occupation: Housewife
- Sisters: Dorothy Randolph
- Spouse: Victor Lord (194?–1950)
- Children: Victoria Lord; Meredith Lord
- Grandchildren: Megan Gordon; Daniel Wolek; Kevin Buchanan; Joey Buchanan; Jessica Buchanan; Natalie Buchanan
- Nieces and nephews: Tony Lord

Eugenia Randolph Lord is a fictional character on the ABC Daytime soap opera One Life to Live. The deceased character exists at the show's inception in 1968, first appearing onscreen in flashbacks in 1969. Lori March assumed the role in 1987, and the character is last shown in 1995.

== Megan Craig Riley ==
Megan Craig Riley
- One Life to Live character
- Portrayed by: Kimaree Beyrent
- Duration: 1974–1975
- First appearance: December 2, 1974
- Last appearance: October 3, 1975
- Created by: Agnes Nixon; Gordon Russell
- Introduced by: Doris Quinlan
In-universe information
- Family: Riley; Wolek (adoptive)
- Parents: Joe Riley; Cathy Craig
- Stepparents: Victoria Lord
- Half-brothers: Kevin Riley Buchanan; Joey Riley Buchanan
- Grandparents: Jim Craig; Anna Wolek; (legal)
- Aunts and uncles: Eileen Riley; Tom Dennison
- Nieces and nephews: Duke Buchanan
- First cousins: Julie Siegel; Tim Siegel; Mari Lynn Dennison; Daniel Wolek (adoptive)

Megan Craig Riley is a fictional character from the ABC Daytime soap opera One Life to Live. She was played by Kimaree Beyrent from December 2, 1974, until October 3, 1975. Megan is the daughter of Joe Riley (Lee Patterson) and Cathy Craig (Dorrie Kavanaugh).

While Joe is presumed dead, wife Victoria "Viki" Lord Riley (Erika Slezak) marries Steve Burke in 1972; Viki is overjoyed when Joe returns, but chooses to stay loyal to Steve in 1973. Joe begins a relationship with Cathy, but he and Viki soon reunite. Viki's divorce from Steve is finalized, but Cathy is pregnant with Joe's child. He offers to marry her, but she refuses. Joe and Viki remarry in a simple ceremony in New York City. Cathy gives birth to Megan on-screen on the episode first-run December 2, 1974, but the child has a congenital heart defect that assures she will not live past adolescence. On the episode first-run October 3, 1975, Viki babysits baby Megan and, while in Viki's care, Megan stops breathing. Viki frantically puts Megan in her car to take her to the hospital but gets into a car accident as she drives in a storm. The accident seriously injures Viki, and Megan dies. Viki recovers, but Cathy swears revenge.

== Jack Scott ==
Jack Scott
- One Life to Live character
- Portrayed by: Arthur Burghardt
- Duration: 1978–1980
- First appearance: 1978
- Last appearance: 1980
- Created by: Gordon Russell
- Introduced by: Joseph Stuart
In-universe information
- Occupation: Physician
- Wife: Carla Gray (1979–80)

Jack Scott is a fictional character from the American soap opera One Life to Live portrayed by actor Arthur Burghardt. He played the role from 1978 until 1980, when the character was killed off. The character had intended to be short term.

== Bert Skelly ==
Bert Skelly
- One Life to Live character
- Portrayed by: Wayne Jones (1969); Herb Davis (1969–1972)
- Duration: 1969–1972
- First appearance: 1969
- Last appearance: 1972
- Created by: Agnes Nixon
- Introduced by: Doris Quinlan
In-universe information
- Occupation: Lawyer

Bert Skelly is a fictional character on the ABC Daytime soap opera One Life to Live. The role was originated by Wayne Jones in 1969, and subsequently played by Herb Davis from 1969 until the character's last appearance in 1972.

== Dave Siegel ==
Dave Siegel
- One Life to Live character
- Portrayed by: Allan Miller
- Duration: 1968–1972
- First appearance: July 1968
- Last appearance: December 13, 1972
- Created by: Agnes Nixon
- Introduced by: Doris Quinlan
In-universe information
- Occupation: Lawyer
- Spouse: Eileen Riley (pre-1968–1972)
- Children: Tim Siegel; Julie Siegel

Dave Siegel is a fictional character on the ABC Daytime soap opera One Life to Live. The role was played by actor Allan Miller from July 19, 1968 through the character's onscreen death December 13, 1972.

The Jewish husband of Eileen Riley and brother-in-law to original male protagonist Joe Riley, attorney Dave Siegel is first introduced just after the series debut in July 1968, and provides regular legal defense to more dynamic series character during his appearance. In 1972, Dave manages to get Steve Burke acquitted for the accidental death of his secretary Marcy Wade. Unbeknownst to Dave, the crucial evidence comes from Joe, who was presumed dead. Eileen and close friend Vince Wolek (Antony Ponzini) never give up hope on Joe's impending return, and she is overjoyed when he finally reappears. Dave dies onscreen of a heart attack, leaving Eileen devastated.

== Julie Siegel Toland ==
Julie Siegel Toland
- One Life to Live character
- Portrayed by: Lee Warrick (1969–1974); Leonie Norton (1974–1976)
- Duration: 1969–1976
- First appearance: June 1969
- Last appearance: May 1976
- Created by: Agnes Nixon
- Introduced by: Doris Quinlan
In-universe information
- Other names: Julie Siegel (maiden name)
- Family: Riley
- Parents: Dave Siegel; Eileen Riley Siegel
- Siblings: Tim Siegel
- Spouse: Mark Toland (1971–1975)
- Aunts and uncles: Joe Riley; Tom Dennison
- First cousins: Megan Craig Riley; Kevin Riley Buchanan; Joey Riley Buchanan; Mari Lynn Dennison

Julie Siegel Toland is a fictional character on the ABC Daytime soap opera One Life to Live. The role was originated by actress Lee Warrick from June 1969 until September 1974, when she was replaced by Leonie Norton. Norton continued in the role until May 1976, when the character was written off the series as moving to Florida.

Niece of male protagonist Joe Riley, Julie first arrives in fictional Llanview in June 1969 for the wedding of Joe to leading heroine Victoria Lord. In 1970, she becomes close friends to Cathy Craig and falls in love with lothario law school student Jack Lawson (David Snell) and moves in with him without marrying, to the chagrin of her socially conservative parents. Julie assumes Jack would marry her upon completion of his law school work, but when she discovers him to be a womanizer and realizes he never intends to tie the knot, she retires to a nervous breakdown. While recovering from this breakdown, Julie meets Dr. Mark Toland, and they fall in love and get married on the May 5, 1971 episode.

Following the death of her father in December 1972, Julie's mother Eileen begins to date again, bothering Julie tremendously. She attempts to seduce her mother's lover, but to no avail. She leaves Llanview in 1976, months after Mark widows her in a Lord family caper.

== Tim Siegel ==
Tim Siegel
- One Life to Live character
- Portrayed by: Bill Fowler (1969); William Cox (1970–1971); Tom Berenger (1975–1976)
- Duration: 1969–1971; 1975–1976
- First appearance: June 1969
- Last appearance: April 6, 1976
- Created by: Agnes Nixon
- Introduced by: Doris Quinlan
In-universe information
- Other names: Timmy Siegel
- Occupation: Construction worker; Law school student
- Family: Riley
- Parents: Dave Siegel; Eileen Riley Siegel
- Siblings: Julie Siegel
- Spouse: Jenny Wolek (1976)
- Aunts and uncles: Joe Riley; Tom Dennison
- First cousins: Megan Craig Riley; Kevin Riley Buchanan; Joey Riley Buchanan; Mari Lynn Dennison

Tim Siegel is fictional character on the ABC Daytime soap opera One Life to Live. The role debuted on the series in June 1969, briefly originated by newcomer Bill Fowler. The role was assumed by William Cox from 1970 until 1971. Actor Tom Berenger stepped in as Tim when the character returns a law school dropout in April 1975. Tim last dies onscreen when Berenger left the series in April 1976.

Law student Tim briefly appears in fictional Llanview in June 1969 with sister Julie (Lee Warrick) for the wedding of his maternal uncle Joe Riley (Lee Patterson) to media heiress and heroine Victoria Lord. He returns in 1970 when Joe is presumed dead, a fate he, his mother Eileen, and family refused to believe. After briefly engaging in a relationship with Cathy Craig, Tim returns to school. Tom Berenger steps into the role as Tim returns in April 1975 as a law school dropout. He becomes a construction worker and falls in love with novitiate nun Jenny Wolek (Katherine Glass). Jenny gives up the cloistered life for Tim, and the two get engaged. Her cousin Vince, outraged that Tim is stealing Jenny from the church, gets into a fight that exacerbates a latent brain aneurysm in Tim. When it becomes apparent that Tim was dying, Jenny arranges for a hasty wedding ceremony in Tim's hospital room, and with Joe, Eileen, and Julie looking on, the two marry on the April 5, 1976 episode. Tim dies shortly after the marriage is officiated on the following April 6 episode.

== Price Trainor ==
Price Trainor
- One Life to Live character
- Portrayed by: Thurman Scott (1968); Peter DeAnda (1968–1970)
- Duration: 1968–1970
- First appearance: July 15, 1968
- Last appearance: December 1970
- Created by: Agnes Nixon
- Introduced by: Doris Quinlan
In-universe information
- Occupation: Physician at Llanview Hospital

Dr. Price Trainor is a fictional character on the ABC Daytime soap opera One Life to Live. The role was originated on the pilot July 15, 1968 by actor Thurman Scott, who played the role during the show's first week. Peter DeAnda took over and played the role through the character's last appearance in December 1970.

== Naomi Vernon ==
Naomi Vernon
- One Life to Live character
- Portrayed by: Teri Keane
- Duration: 1976–1977
- First appearance: June 1976
- Last appearance: September 30, 1977
- Created by: Gordon Russell
- Introduced by: Doris Quinlan
In-universe information
- Occupation: Housewife
- Spouse: Will Vernon (pre-1976–1977)
- Children: Brad Vernon; Samantha Vernon
- Grandchildren: Kristine Karr; Sammi Garretson

Naomi Vernon is a fictional character on the ABC Daytime soap opera One Life to Live. The role was originated and played by Terri Keane from June 1976 until the character's onscreen death September 30, 1977.

== Samantha Vernon ==
Samantha Vernon
- One Life to Live character
- Portrayed by: Julia Montgomery (1976–1978, 1979–1981, 1987); Susan Keith (1978–1979); Dorian Lopinto (1981–1984)
- Duration: 1976–1984; 1987
- First appearance: June 1976
- Last appearance: April 1987
- Created by: Gordon Russell
- Introduced by: Doris Quinlan
In-universe information
- Parents: Will Vernon; Naomi Vernon
- Brothers: Brad Vernon
- Spouse: Asa Buchanan (1981); Rafe Garretson (1984)
- Daughters: Sammi Garretson
- Nieces and nephews: Kristine Karr

Samantha Vernon is a fictional character on the ABC Daytime soap opera One Life to Live. The role was originated by Julia Montgomery in June 1976. Montgomery left the series in September 1978. To accommodate her departure, the writers involved the character of Samantha in a disfiguring car crash. While the character was under bandages, actress Susan Keith assumed the part in October 1978. Due to negative audience reaction, the producers let Keith go at the end of her first contract cycle. Julie Montgomery was persuaded to return in January 1979; she remained for two additional years. Dorian Lopinto assumed the role in January 1981, playing Samantha through the character's onscreen death November 16, 1984. In April 1987, Samantha was shown along with many other deceased One Life to Live characters in a short story arc occurring in the afterlife. Julie Montgomery reprised the role for these sequences.

Brad's little sister, Samantha, is introduced onscreen in June 1976, presented as resentful of her neglectful, workaholic father, Dr. Will Vernon. Samantha soon doggedly chases older man Tony Lord who, on the rebound from Pat Ashley, succumbs to an affair. However, Tony later admits that he never really loved Sam. Fleeing into a raging thunderstorm, Sam's car collides head-on with another vehicle on the highway, leaving her disfigured from facial burns and killing her father's fiancée Dr. Pamela Shephard. Following successful reconstructive surgery, Sam faces an identity crisis after the bandages are removed to reveal a beautiful, but very different looking woman (actress Susan Keith now assuming the role). In early 1979, Sam leaves Llanview to receive corrective plastic surgery, which restores her previous face. Samantha returns to Llanview, and marries much older Asa Buchanan in 1981. Unbeknownst to all, Asa's believed-to-be-dead first wife Olympia Buchanan appears in Llanview alive and refuses to grant Asa a divorce. Asa soon imprisons Olympia and invalidly marries Samantha. Olympia escapes several times and attempts to kill either Asa and Samantha, but her plans are repeatedly foiled and she returns to her imprisonment. Finally, the truth about Olympia comes out, and Samantha leaves Asa. Samantha soon falls in love with Asa's nephew Rafe Garretson, and marries him in 1984. Samantha becomes pregnant, but is later discovered lifeless, floating facedown in a fitness club hot tub. Declared brain dead in November 1984, the child she was carrying was artificially implanted into her friend Delilah Ralston, and Rafe makes the painful decision to remove her from life support. The baby Delilah surrogates is born and named after Samantha. Samantha reappears in 1987 when friend Viki Lord Buchanan briefly dies and goes to Heaven.

== Will Vernon ==
Will Vernon
- One Life to Live character
- Portrayed by: Farley Granger (1976–1977); Bernie McInerney (1977); Anthony George (1977–1984)
- Duration: 1976–1984
- First appearance: June 1976
- Last appearance: November 1984
- Created by: Gordon Russell
- Introduced by: Doris Quinlan
In-universe information
- Occupation: Psychotherapist
- Spouse: Naomi Vernon (pre-1976–1977)
- Children: Brad Vernon; Samantha Vernon
- Grandchildren: Kristine Karr; Sammi Garretson

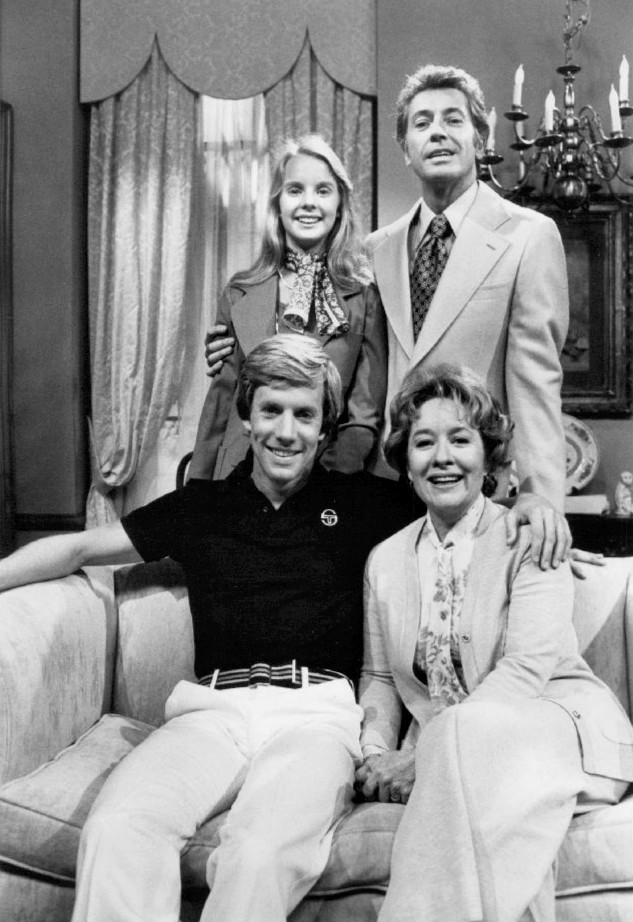
Vernons, from left clockwise: Julia Montgomery as Sam, Farley Granger as Will, Teri Keane as Naomi, and Jameson Parker as Brad, 1977.

Will Vernon Psy.D., M.D. is a fictional character on the ABC Daytime serial One Life to Live. The role was originated by film actor Farley Granger from June 1976 through early 1977. Bernie McInerney briefly assumed the role from March 1977 until late 1977. Anthony George last played Will from November 1977 through the character's last appearance in 1984.

Llanview Hospital psychotherapist Dr. Will Vernon first arrives in fictional Llanview in June 1976. Before arriving in town, he'd already had one mistress, prompting his neurotic wife Naomi to take pills to numb her pain. Will was genuinely remorseful over his cheating ways, but passive-aggressive and manipulating Naomi never let him forget his sins. Naomi grows furiously jealous at the close relationship Will shares with secretary Jenny Wolek. Fearful that Will might leave her, Naomi concocted a fake suicide attempt in order to elicit her husband's sympathy. Her plan went awry and she actually did die as a result of taking too many sleeping pills. Will spends the duration of his time in Llanview psychoanalyzing dynamic series characters and guilty over his wife's death. Burying his time in work and neglecting his children, Dr. Vernon last appears onscreen when his daughter Sam dies in November 1984.

== Marcy Wade ==
Marcy Wade
- One Life to Live character
- Portrayed by: Francesca James
- Duration: 1970–1972
- First appearance: August 1970
- Last appearance: January 3, 1972
- Created by: Agnes Nixon
- Introduced by: Doris Quinlan
In-universe information
- Occupation: Secretary at The Banner

Marcy Wade is a fictional character on the ABC Daytime soap opera One Life to Live. The role was originated and played by actress Francesca James from August 1970 until the character's onscreen death January 3, 1972. Marcy arrived in Llanview looking for her husband Tom Mackenzie, an amnesia victim then going by the name Tom Edwards. Tom and Marcy previously had a life in Canada where Tom worked as a securities trader. A compulsive gambler, Marcy found herself indebted to loan sharks and stole securities from Tom's briefcase to pay them. Tom was eventually arrested for grand larceny and sent to prison. In Llanview, Marcy thought she would be safe from the loan sharks who still wanted her because instead of paying her debt with the stolen securities, she had actually gambled them away. She began a new life as a secretary for Victoria Lord Riley at her family newspaper The Banner. However, Marcy was recognized by mobster Stan Perlo. Perlo made a deal with her. If she would become an informant for the mob, getting confidential police information, her gambling debts would be cancelled. Marcy secretly listened to private conversations at the newspaper and passed on information about an attempt to stop the local drug trade, which resulted in local cop Vinnie Wolek being shot. Horrified at Marcy's selfishness, Tom wanted to go to Victor Lord and confess everything about his past and Marcy. Before Tom could act, Stan Perlo, in a failed attempt to kill Vinnie's girlfriend Millie Parks, held her and Marcy hostage. Tom tried to save them, but he and Stan killed one another in a shootout. After Tom's death, Marcy became pathologically obsessed with Steve Burke, editor of The Banner. Steve and Viki had fallen in love and planned to be married. Through her roommate Carla Gray, Marcy learned of Viki's previous psychiatric history, which included a case of split personality. Marcy researched Viki's history in The Banner archives and devised an intricate plot to get her rival out of the way. She began drugging Viki's coffee with barbiturates, and while she was unconscious, donned a blonde wig and pretended to be Niki Smith, Viki's former split personality. Soon Viki began to doubt her own sanity, creating conflict in her upcoming wedding to Steve. In the final stage of her plan, Marcy set a trap for Vinnie Wolek. She intended to lure him to the docks outside Ernie's Bar, and dressed as Niki would kill him, leaving behind a confession signed as Niki Smith. With Viki either arrested or sent to an asylum, she would be free to have Steve all to herself. The meticulous plan went awry when Vinnie told Steve about the meeting on the docks. Steve went in Vinnie's place, and when he came face to face with Marcy dressed as Niki, he knew she had been the mastermind behind the scheme to drive Viki mad. The two struggled over the gun Marcy brought to kill Vinnie, and she was shot and killed herself.

== Wanda Webb ==
Wanda Webb Wolek
- One Life to Live character
- Portrayed by: Marilyn Chris (1972–1977, 1980–1994); Lee Lawson (1977–1979)
- Duration: 1972–1994
- First appearance: February 1972
- Last appearance: February 1994
- Created by: Agnes Nixon
- Introduced by: Doris Quinlan
In-universe information
- Other names: Wanda Webb (maiden name)
- Occupation: Bookstore owner; Waitress; Owner of Wanda's Place diner
- Family: Buchanan
- Siblings: Paul Webb
- Spouse: Vince Wolek (1975–1981)
- Nephews: Jason Webb

Wanda Webb Wolek is a fictional character on the ABC Daytime soap opera One Life to Live. The role was originated by actress Marilyn Chris in February 1972, a role she played through 1977. Lee Lawson stepped into the role between 1977 until 1979, and Chris reprised the role from 1980 until Wanda's final appearance in 1994.

Waitress Wanda Webb first appears in fictional Llanview in February 1972. She soon becomes romantically involved with Vince Wolek, who she marries Valentine's Day 1975. Vince dies in 1981, leaving Wanda widowed.

Wanda is concurrently revealed to be a second cousin to Asa Buchanan, and remains in Llanview to run a restaurant. Offering her no-nonsense advice and delicious food, Wanda became a neighborhood friend to Llanview residents throughout the 1980s. Besides Wanda dating various men after Vince's death, She also took in her nephew, Jason Webb, who eventually left town to go to Texas with LeeAnn Demerest. She engaged in a serious confrontation with Dorian Lord when Dorian had Sloan Carpenter attacked outside her restaurant, and with Marty Saybrooke when Marty slept with newly engaged Jason, preparing to marry LeeAnn. Her restaurant, called Wanda's Place, was in the same Angel Square location which would later become home to Vega's café, and later the Buenos Dias Café. Wanda leaves town in 1994 when she remarries and moves to Seattle to open a bookstore.

== Rachel Wilson ==
Rachel Wilson Farmer
- One Life to Live character
- Portrayed by: Nancy Barrett
- First appearance: Early 1974
- Last appearance: July 1974
- Created by: Agnes Nixon; Gordon Russell
- Introduced by: Doris Quinlan
In-universe information
- Other names: Rachel Wilson (maiden name)
- Spouse: Ben Farmer (until 1974)

Rachel Wilson Farmer is a fictional character on the ABC Daytime soap opera One Life to Live. The role was played by actress Nancy Barrett from early 1974 until the character's notable onscreen death months later at the negligent hands of Drs. Mark Toland and Dorian Cramer in July.

== See also ==
- List of One Life to Live characters

== Notes ==
1. Esther Rolle temporarily assumed the role for Hayman in 1971.
