= Gordon Russell (writer) =

American screenwriter (1929–1981)

- Born: August 15, 1929; Salem, Massachusetts, U.S.
- Died: January 19, 1981 (aged 51); New York City, U.S.
- Occupation: Television writer
- Spouse: Merri Russell
- Children: 4
- Parent: Janet Russell

Gordon Russell (August 15, 1929 – January 19, 1981) was an American daytime soap opera writer.

== Career ==
A former actor, Russell wrote for several daytime soap operas, including Dark Shadows, The Doctors and A Time For Us. He was hired by the network to write the serial General Hospital but died before he began writing that program.

He is best known for a long run as the writer of One Life to Live, which began on April 5, 1971 and lasted until March 14, 1980. . He frequently collaborated with writer Sam Hall, and they worked together on both Dark Shadows and One Life to Live.

== Awards and nominations ==
Daytime Emmy Awards

NOMINATIONS

- (1980 & 1981; Best Writing; One Life to Live)

Writers Guild of America Award

NOMINATIONS

- (1979 season; One Life to Live)
