= Michael Storm =

American musician and actor (born 1939)

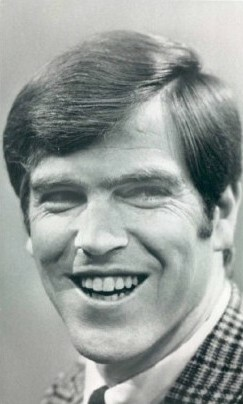
- Storm as Dr. Larry Wolek in One Life to Live, c. 1973
- Born: August 9, 1939 (age 86); Chicago, Illinois, U.S.
- Occupations: Actor, musician
- Years active: 1969–2001
- Known for: Dr. Larry Wolek
- Television: One Life to Live
- Spouse: Sally Beall (1969–present)
- Children: 2
- Relatives: Jim Storm (brother)

Michael Storm (born August 9, 1939) is an American musician and actor.

== Music career ==
After playing in a folk music trio called the Other Singers, Storm founded the Good Time Singers, a band formed to replace the New Christy Minstrels on The Andy Williams Show. From December 1963-January 1964 Storm also performed shows with Gordon and Sheila MacRae, supported by their daughters Heather and Meredith and musician Craig Smith.

== Acting career ==
Storm has appeared on many television shows, but is recognized by many for his role as original character Dr. Larry Wolek on the ABC soap opera, One Life to Live, a role he played as a lead character from 1969 through 1992, and in a recurring capacity continually from 1992 until 2004. In 1978, Storm earned a Daytime Emmy nomination in the Outstanding Lead Actor in a Drama Series category,

He was preceded in the role of Larry by his real-life brother, Jim Storm, who, in turn, had been preceded by Paul Tulley. In the storyline, Jim's Larry Wolek was badly burned in a fire and underwent plastic surgery, and Michael's Larry Wolek was revealed when the bandages were removed. This new plot device would prove so successful that many other shows, including Dynasty (and One Life to Live itself in later years), would use it when recasting key characters.

== Filmography ==
=== Film ===
Year	Title	Role	Notes
1976	The Next Man	Economic advisor	Feature film
1997	Deep Cover	Judge Graham	Feature film
2001	Hellgig	Guest	Short film

=== Television ===
Year	Title	Role	Notes
1969–2004	One Life to Live	Dr. Larry Wolek #3 (took over role from his brother, Jim Storm, who was Dr. Larry Wolek #2)	Daytime serial (contract role 1969-1992; recurring role 1992-2004; total of 953 episodes) For Daytime Emmy info, see Awards and nominations section below for details
1970	All My Children	Dr. Larry Wolek #3	Daytime serial (guest role @ crossover appearances)
1977	Kojak	Joseph Magid	Episode: "Kojak's Days: Part 1"
1978-1983	Family Feud	Celebrity contestant (2 games)	Episode: "Valentine's Day Special" (1978) Episode: "Soap Stars and Their Real Life Families Week II" (1983)
1985	Trivia Trap	Celebrity contestant (5 games)	Episode: "Soap Opera Stars Valentine Week; One Life to Live vs. General Hospital: Game 1"; Episode: "Soap Opera Stars Valentine Week; One Life to Live vs. General Hospital: Game 2"; Episode: "Soap Opera Stars Valentine Week; One Life to Live vs. General Hospital: Game 3"; Episode: "Soap Opera Stars Valentine Week; One Life to Live vs. General Hospital: Game 4"; Episode: "Soap Opera Stars Valentine Week; One Life to Live vs. General Hospital: Game 5"
1985	ABC Afterschool Special	Spence Childs	Episode: "Getting Even: A Wimp's Revenge"
1985	Celebrity Double Talk	Celebrity contestant (5 games)	Episode: "October 6, 1985"; Episode: "October 7, 1985"; Episode: "October 8, 1985"; Episode: "October 9, 1985"; Episode: "October 10, 1985"
1994	Dream On	Middle-aged guy	Episode: "The Courtship of Martin’s Father"
1996	Hot Line	Martin Jennings	Episode: "Double Exposure"
1997	JAG	Admiral Hercules Elgins	Episode: "Impact"
1998	Diagnosis Murder	Morris Wheaton	Episode: "Promise to Keep"
1998	Blade Squad a/k/a Inline Cop	Derek McKinnon	Television movie (unsold pilot)
1999	The Practice	Vicor Stanfield	Episode: "Split Decisions"
2001	Bull	Role unknown (episode was unaired due to cancellation of series)	Episode: "Visit"

== Awards and nominations ==
Year	Award	Category	Work	Result
1978	Daytime Emmy Award	Outstanding Lead Actor in a Drama Series	One Life to Live	Nominated

== Sources ==
- Stax, Mike (2016). Swim Through the Darkness: My Search for Craig Smith and the Mystery of Maitreya Kali. Process Media. ISBN 9781934170656.
