= List of Strong Medicine episodes =

Strong Medicine is an American medical drama created by Whoopi Goldberg and Tammy Ader that aired on Lifetime. It aired from July 23, 2000 to February 5, 2006.

The show focused on Dr. Luisa "Lu" Delgado and Dr. Dana Stowe, two women who come together to run a women's clinic. After Janine Turner (Dana) exited the series, she was replaced later by Patricia Richardson and Rick Schroeder to be Lu's (Rosa Blasi) partner.

The series aired 132 episodes over the course of six seasons.

== Series overview ==
Season	Episodes	Originally released	
Season	Episodes	First released	Last released
1	22	July 23, 2000	March 11, 2001
2	22	July 15, 2001	March 3, 2002
3	22	July 21, 2002	March 16, 2003
4	22	June 15, 2003	February 15, 2004
5	22	June 13, 2004	January 30, 2005
6	22	June 12, 2005	February 5, 2006

== Episodes ==
=== Season 1 (2000–01) ===
No. overall	No. in season	Title	Directed by	Written by	Original release date	Prod. code
1	1	"Pilot"	Robert Lieberman	Tammy Ader	July 23, 2000	101
In the series premiere, Dr. Lu Delgado's free women's clinic is about to be shut down for low funding. Lu seeks the assistance from Rittenhouse Hospital and its women's surgeon, Dr. Dana Stowe. Rittenhouse and Dana pass on funding Lu's clinic, causing friction between Lu and Dana. Meanwhile, Dana tries to convince one of her patients that she has ovarian cancer and will not be able to have children and Lu deals with a child abuse situation involving two parents. In the end, Dr. Lydia Emerson makes a plan to merge Lu's clinic with Rittenhouse Hospital.
2	2	"Pre-existing Conditions"	Rick Rosenthal	Tammy Ader	July 30, 2000	102
Lu and Dana have trouble sharing space at the newly merged practice. One of Lu's patients needs to have a hysterectomy, but the woman believes she has already had one. Lu tracks down a Chinese doctor who lied to the woman, causing Lu to keep tabs on the questionable doctor. Meanwhile, Dana has to tell parents that their child born from a surrogate may be born with a defect that can cause mental disabilities. When the parents inform Dana they no longer want the baby, she tries to convince the surrogate mother to keep the baby. Also, Peter gets in between a patient and her boyfriend, while Lana has technical issues with the new computer system.
3	3	"Misconceptions"	Rick Wallace	Kathryn Pratt	August 6, 2000	103
Dana treats a patient of Lu's who is HIV positive, but Dana is concerned when she learns the mother is no longer giving him medication at Lu's consent. This causes a disagreement between her and Lu, especially when Dana involves Dr. Jackson in the situation. Meanwhile, Dana is being featured on a news piece and the interviewer wants her help conceiving with her husband, who doesn't share his wife's interest in parenthood. She later gets a surprise when it's not her husband she wants a baby with – it's his sister. Also, Lu's son, Marc, wants to live with his father.
4	4	"Second Look"	Michael Lange	R.J. Anderson	August 13, 2000	104
Lu deals with a former drug addict patient who she thinks is using again, but she discovers she has Lupus and tries to keep the woman on the straight and narrow. Meanwhile, a former beauty pageant queen and friend of Dana's ask that she perform extensive plastic surgery on her, but Dana refuses to perform the procedure. After her friend lands in the ER, Dana rethinks her decision until the husband convinces Dana and his wife that he likes her the way she is. Also, Marc goes to Peter with adolescent issues as he tries to figure out why a transvestite is having menopausal side effects. And, two young teenagers vandalize the clinic, so Lu and Lana come up with a way for them to make amends.
5	5	"Performance Anxiety"	Martha Mitchell	Jeremy R. Littman	August 20, 2000	105
When a girls basketball player falls during a game Lu discovers the girl is taking steroids. This leads her to test the entire team, causing uproar among the players and their coach. Meanwhile, a Jane Doe is rushed to the ER and has Dana's information in her purse. The patient goes into a coma, leaving Dana without any family contact for her patient. Dana also questions her relationship with Nick. Lana meanwhile suspects a reverend of inappropriate acts.
6	6	"Drug Interactions"	Sarah Pia Anderson	Allison Robbins	August 27, 2000	106
Dana suspects abuse when Bob's wife, Susan, comes to the hospital with bruises. She questions Bob only to learn that she has Multiple Sclerosis. Meanwhile, one of Lu's drug addict patients gets on board with a woman who runs an orphanage for children of addicts – who pays the addicts to get their tubes tied. Later, Marc gets into trouble after Lu buys him an expensive game as a gift.
7	7	"Do No Harm"	Steve DeJarnatt	Richard Alexander	September 3, 2000	107
While a council woman is getting checked at the clinic a gang member comes in and shoots, wounding both the council woman and one of Lu's patients, who is also a gang member. The council woman needs a liver transplant as an effect of the shooting and Lu's patient, Trini, is a match. Trini and her mother, Marisol, refuse the transplant at first, but to teach Trini a lesson, Marisol gives the council woman part of her own liver. Meanwhile, Peter treats a woman who may have PTSD from the war when she lived in Cambodia.
8	8	"Miracle Cure"	Jerry London	Carla Kettner	September 10, 2000	108
One of Lu's old friends, Meredith, shows up at the clinic because she is worried about her daughter. Lu discovers the girl has Tay–Sachs disease, but the parents are in denial of helping her. A trip to Meredith's mother has the mother revealing to Lu that Meredith was adopted. Meredith and her husband disagree about bringing any more children into the world since they are carriers of the disease. Meanwhile, Dana's pilot patient has a brain disorder, causing her to no longer be able to fly planes.
9	9	"Dependency"	Steve Robman	Allison Robbins	October 8, 2000	109
Dana tries to help the wife of a powerful real estate developer when she finds out the husband is abusive. Meanwhile, a construction worker has his eyes set on Lu, but she begins to get defensive due to her past history. Also, a foster guardian brings one of her children to Lu thinking he has ADHD, but Lu soon discovers the guardian is the one taking the boy's medication.
10	10	"BRCA1"	Joe Napolitano	Tammy Ader & Richard Alexander	October 15, 2000	110
Dana's decreased progress in breast cancer research has her in a frustrated state, especially with the arrival of her parents during an important speech about her study. Meanwhile, Lu tries to get one of her patients time off work after the woman is diagnosed with breast cancer. Later, Dana's mother discloses that she herself has breast cancer.
11	11	"BRCA2"	Steve DeJarnatt	Richard Alexander	October 15, 2000	111
Dana takes a leave from the clinic to be with her mother during her mastectomy, leaving Lu in charge of her patients. Dana tries to get her father to come to Philadelphia to be with her mother during the procedure. Lu's talk at a preparatory school doesn't go well after one of the students comes to Lu for the morning after pill, and later for rape. Meanwhile, Peter takes an alternative approach to helping one of Dana's patients who has Hodgkins, and Peter and the patient end up in jail because of it. Dana and Lu get tested for the BRCA1 and BRCA2 genes.
12	12	"Brainchild"	Scott Paulin	Tammy Ader	October 29, 2000	112
Marc suspects one of his friends is an alcoholic and brings it to Lu's attention after he brings the girl into the clinic. The mother won't accept this, especially after the girl tells Lu that Marc has been drinking too. Meanwhile, one of Dana's patients with Parkinson's wants to try an experimental procedure involving aborted fetal cells. And, Peter falls for a patient he helps who has severe migraine attacks.
13	13	"Second Opinion"	Martha Mitchell	Jeremy R. Littman	December 3, 2000	113
A young girl comes to the hospital with injuries related to a circumcision that was brought on by a cultural ritual from her family. Meanwhile, one of Lu's patients is diagnosed with fibromyalgia and is let go from her job as well as denied disability coverage. Lu also prepares herself to get intimate with Jack. And, Lana and Peter treat a stray dog.
14	14	"Side Effects"	John Perrin Flynn	Jeremy R. Littman	December 10, 2000	114
Dana finds herself in the middle of a mother and father to be when one insists on performing surgery to correct a possible defect in their unborn son. Meanwhile, Lu treats a schizophrenic woman she finds on the street. The woman gets help, but when her meds are switched at Bob's signature she stops taking them due to the side effects and ends up killing another woman at the shelter she stays at. The situation puts Lu in a lose-lose corner. Also, Dana suspects Lana knows about her relationship with Nick.
15	15	"Blessed Events"	Mike Fash	Jeremy R. Littman	December 17, 2000	115
A young engaged couple discovers that the bride to be is pregnant – but the girl is a virgin. Dana tries to figure out how the girl could conceive. Meanwhile, Bob fires a kitchen worker after she appears to be drunk, but Lu isn't convinced she is drunk and tests her to find she has Lou Gehrig's disease. Marc meanwhile develops a crush on a runaway teen who comes to the clinic for the Christmas dinner.
16	16	"Fix"	Steve DeJarnatt	Richard Alexander	January 7, 2001	116
A deaf family refuses to have cochlear implants when the experiment is only viable on the mother and daughter, not the husband. Lu tries to convince the father to let his family be able to hear, but he puts Lu on the spot claiming she wants them to be someone they're not. Lu also introduces Jack to Marc, but it leads Jack to rethink his relationship with Lu. Meanwhile, one of Dana's patients comes to her wanting help stop using needles without the standard rehab cure. Also, Lana's numbers hit on the lottery and she wants to split it with Peter but he won't have it.
17	17	"Maternity"	Carl Weathers	Carla Kettner	January 14, 2001	117
A mother suffers depression after the birth of her baby and comes to Dana for help. Dana tries to help her husband after the woman runs away from her family. Meanwhile, Dana meets Nick's mother for the first time, but it ends up putting Dana on thin ice. Lu helps a woman whose toxic building triggers early menopause, which also motivates Lu to help the residents of the building to leave – much to their dismay.
18	18	"Complications"	Joe Napolitano	Richard Alexander	January 21, 2001	118
A 12-year-old girl is diagnosed with gonorrhea and tells Lu her teacher is responsible. After the teacher is arrested, Marc informs Lu that the teacher could never be responsible for that causing Lu to question the patient's honesty. Meanwhile, Dana has two pregnant women whose babies have the same father – but neither woman knows. And, Lu recommends that Lana get treated for utero complications, which could include a possible hysterectomy.
19	19	"Childcare"	Michael Lange	Jeremy R. Littman	February 18, 2001	119
A mother brings her young daughter with autism to the clinic to see Lu. The mother becomes convinced that the medication Lu prescribed to help find the girl's diagnosis is a cure for her not speaking. Lu tries to convince the mother otherwise. Meanwhile, Dana is caught between a mother and her son-in-law when it comes to the man's wife being taken off life support. In the middle of the battle Dana and Bob take a flight for a conference and Dana must deliver a baby in flight. Also, Peter tries to help a patient learn how to dance like her husband.
20	20	"Drugstore Cowgirl"	Jerry London	Carla Kettner	February 25, 2001	120
Dana treats a dying priest who is transgender. The priest contracted a disease while on a mission trip and Dana is unsure how to proceed when the church wants to move the priest to the church's hospital. Meanwhile, a local pharmacy won't carry certain high-priced drugs that Lu's patients need so Lu convinces the pharmacist to stock them and advertises the store in return. Later the pharmacy is robbed and the pharmacist is killed.
21	21	"Wednesday Night Fever"	Steve DeJarnatt	Jeremy R. Littman	March 4, 2001	121
During a Wednesday night all hours shift Lu treats a woman whose baby is cut out of her and kidnapped, a taxi driver who has been raped, and Bob's wife's deteriorating MS condition. In between she also has to deal with Bill and his family problems concerning Marc. Meanwhile, Lana goes on a date with a man she met online and it ends up with him in the ER. Peter meanwhile helps a college patient with back problems.
22	22	"Mortality"	John Perrin Flynn	Richard Alexander	March 11, 2001	122
In the first season finale, Lu tries to the treat the mother who goes on a hungry strike until her son is no longer on the line to be executed for murder. Peter and Lana help a woman who has a phobia against bald men. Meanwhile, Dana rethinks staying at Rittenhouse after a woman loses her baby when she believed she should've had a C-section and Dana talks her out of it leaving Dana feeling responsible. Nick becomes homeless and Bob discovers his relationship with Dana when Nick moves in with Dana.

=== Season 2 (2001–02) ===
No. overall	No. in season	Title	Directed by	Written by	Original release date
23	1	"Donors"	Joe Napolitano	Carla Kettner	July 15, 2001
24	2	"Adverse Reactions"	John Perrin Flynn	Carla Kettner	July 22, 2001
Dr. Jackson finds himself in hot water after denying a job to an overweight woman; Dana treats a patient who is diagnosed with Gulf War Syndrome; Lana cares for an abandoned newborn baby.
25	3	"Gray Matter"	Dave Thomas	Yahlin Chang	July 29, 2001
Dana treats a former high school rival who is diagnosed with a brain tumor; an ER nurse plans to sue the hospital after contracting HIV from a patient.
26	4	"History"	Jesus Salvador Trevino	Richard Alexander	August 5, 2001
Her grandmother's battle with cancer takes Lu back to the founding of the South Philadelphia Women's Clinic.
27	5	"Attachments"	Steve De Jarnatt	Jeremy R. Littman	August 12, 2001
Dana is demonized for causing a professional baseball player to miss an important game. Lu helps a sick concert pianist make an important audition.
28	6	"Relief"	Steve Gomer	Richard Alexander	August 19, 2001
An embryo donor's death confronts Dana with an ethical dilemma. Lu tries to keep a heart transplant candidate's hopes alive.
29	7	"Impaired"	John Perrin Flynn	Jeremy R. Littman & Sara Israel	August 26, 2001
Dana squares off with a pregnant mother who refuses to give up alcohol. Lu tries helping a mother whose Alzheimer's Disease could make it hard to care for her disabled son.
30	8	"Rebirth"	Steve Gomer	Richard Alexander	September 9, 2001
Lu finds herself in trouble with the law and the community after stopping a diabetic from being beaten by the police. Dana's former fiancee contracts a fatal form of breast cancer.
31	9	"Control Group"	Mike Fash	Jeremy R. Littman	September 16, 2001
A political candidate endangers her own life by refusing an abortion. Nick's misdiagnosis causes a couple to be suspected of abusing their adopted son.
32	10	"Zol Zein Gezint"	Michael Nankin	Yahlin Chang	October 7, 2001
Lu uncovers a case of survivor's guilt that has led to a young woman's eating disorder. Dana is pressured to make sure Robert's wife gets an experimental drug to treat her MS.
33	11	"Systemic"	Steve De Jarnatt	Richard Alexander	October 14, 2001
As she discovers that an old friend is now homeless, Dana suspects a difficult adopted teenage girl of threatening her mother.
34	12	"Accidents"	John Perrin Flynn	Richard Alexander	October 21, 2001
Dana struggles to explain how a mistake has left a black couple with one white twin baby boy. Lu uncovers the secret being kept by a prominent Rabbi and his wife.
35	13	"Silent Epidemic"	Randall Zisk	Jeremy R. Littman & Carla Kettner	November 11, 2001
An ice skater's Olympic hopes are jeopardized by medicine to control her epileptic seizures; Lu squares off against a controversial talk radio personality who also happens to be the father of Marc's girlfriend.
36	14	"Hot Flash"	Joe Napolitano	Carla Kettner	November 18, 2001
Dana diagnoses an Amish teenager with Mad Cow Disease; Lu's efforts to help an unlicensed daycare facility to remain open have dangerous repercussions.
37	15	"Bloodwork"	Steve Gomer	Carla Kettner & Jeremy R. Littman	December 2, 2001
Lu stands up for a patient whose job is in jeopardy because of genetic testing; a pregnant mother suspects her teenaged son's suspected of abusing drugs, only to find that the symptoms are that of lead poisoning.
38	16	"Black 'n' Flu"	Steve De Jarnatt	Richard Alexander	December 9, 2001
While Dana's unexpected illness suggests that she might be pregnant, Lu faces an outbreak of a deadly, and highly contagious, disease in a college dorm.
39	17	"Precautions"	David Livingston	Emily Dwass	January 6, 2002
Lu tries tracking down a missing baby, she discovers that the mother is a wanted criminal; Dana reluctantly agrees to appear in a commercial for the hospital, only to find herself being replaced by an actress.
40	18	"Shock"	Mike Fash	Carla Kettner	January 13, 2002
A strike cripples operations at Rittenhouse.
41	19	"Type and Cross"	Dave Thomas	Jeremy R. Littman	January 20, 2002
A blood shortage at the hospital exposes the long hidden secrets.
42	20	"Rape Kit"	John Perrin Flynn	Tammy Ader & Richard Alexander	February 17, 2002
Lu ends up in the emergency room after she is raped by Dr. Kilner, the star surgeon of Rittenhouse Hospital; Dana treats a critically injured woman whose car accident might not have been an accident.
43	21	"Trauma"	Joe Napolitano	Carla Kettner	February 24, 2002
As Lu struggles following her rape, Dana is forced to turn to her attacker for help in saving a patient's life.
44	22	"Recovery Time"	John Perrin Flynn	Richard Alexander	March 2, 2002
Lu's life spins out of control following the grand Jury's refusal to indict Dr. Kilner for rape.

=== Season 3 (2002–03) ===
No. overall	No. in season	Title	Directed by	Written by	Original release date
45	1	"Positive"	John Perrin Flynn	Carla Kettner	July 21, 2002
46	2	"Outcomes"	Joe Napolitano	Richard Alexander	July 28, 2002
47	3	"Stages"	Joanna Kerns	Jeremy R. Littman	August 4, 2002
48	4	"Heartbeat"	Mike Fash	Sara B. Cooper	August 11, 2002
49	5	"Compassionate Release"	Bill Duke	Carla Kettner	August 18, 2002
50	6	"Discharged"	Steve De Jarnatt	Richard Alexander	August 25, 2002
51	7	"Admissions"	John Perrin Flynn	Tammy Ader & Richard Alexander	September 8, 2002
52	8	"Contraindications"	Allison Liddi-Brown	Jeremy R. Littman	September 15, 2002
53	9	"Family History"	Martha Mitchell	Carla Kettner	October 6, 2002
54	10	"House Calls"	John Perrin Flynn	Jeremy R. Littman & Laura Wolner	October 13, 2002
55	11	"Flesh and Blood"	Rick Wallace	Richard Alexander	October 20, 2002
56	12	"Blush"	Dianne Houston	Anne Kenney	November 10, 2002
57	13	"Deterioration"	Karen Gaviola	Richard Alexander	November 17, 2002
58	14	"Poison"	Jan Eliasberg	Carla Kettner	December 8, 2002
59	15	"The Philadelphia Chromosome"	T.R. Babu Subramaniam	Laura Wolner	December 15, 2002
60	16	"PMS, Lies and Red Tape"	Dave Thomas	Richard Alexander	January 5, 2003
61	17	"Orders"	Philip Casnoff	Jeremy R. Littman	January 12, 2003
62	18	"Blocked Lines"	Jerry London	Pamela K. Long	January 19, 2003
63	19	"Intensive Care"	Jan Eliasberg	Carla Kettner	February 16, 2003
64	20	"Addicted to Love"	Joanna Kerns	Richard Alexander	February 23, 2003
65	21	"Degeneration"	John Perrin Flynn	Jeremy R. Littman	March 9, 2003
66	22	"Risk"	John Perrin Flynn	Richard Alexander	March 16, 2003

=== Season 4 (2003–04) ===
No. overall	No. in season	Title	Directed by	Written by	Original release date
67	1	"The Hero Heart"	John Perrin Flynn	Rick Alexander; Developed by: Whoopi Goldberg	June 15, 2003
68	2	"Emergency Contacts"	Joe Napolitano	James Stanley & Diane Messina Stanley; Developed by: Whoopi Goldberg	June 22, 2003
69	3	"Heartbeats and Deadbeats"	Marita Grabiak	Laura Wolner	June 29, 2003
70	4	"Rash Decisions"	Dave Thomas	Rick Alexander; Developed by: Whoopi Goldberg	July 6, 2003
71	5	"Breathing Lessons"	Oz Scott	Stephen Beck; Developed by: Whoopi Goldberg	July 13, 2003
72	6	"Misdiagnosis Murder"	Mike Fash	Kathryn Prat; Developed by: Whoopi Goldberg	July 20, 2003
73	7	"Vaccinations"	Allison Liddi-Brown	James Stanley & Diane Messina Stanley; Developed by: Whoopi Goldberg	July 27, 2003
74	8	"Temperature's Rising"	Joe Napolitano	Laura Wolner; Developed by: Whoopi Goldberg	August 10, 2003
75	9	"Speculum for a Heavyweight"	John Perrin Flynn	Rick Alexander & Laura Wolner; Developed by: Whoopi Goldberg	August 17, 2003
76	10	"Bad Liver"	Philip Casnoff	Richard Alexander; Developed by: Whoopi Goldberg	September 7, 2003
77	11	"Maternal Mirrors"	Jerry London	Ethlie Ann Vare; Developed by: Whoopi Goldberg	September 14, 2003
78	12	"Jeaneology"	John Perrin Flynn	James Stanley & Diane Messina Stanley; Developed by: Whoopi Goldberg	October 5, 2003
79	13	"Skin"	Joanna Kerns	Rick Alexander; Developed by: Whoopi Goldberg	October 12, 2003
80	14	"Love and Let Die"	Jan Eliasberg	Laura Wolner Developed by: Whoopi Goldberg	November 2, 2003
81	15	"Coming Clean"	Anthony Cowley	Developed by: Whoopi Goldberg	November 9, 2003
82	16	"Prescriptions"	Mike Fash	Rick Alexander; Developed by: Whoopi Goldberg	December 7, 2003
83	17	"Seize the Day"	Philip Casnoff	Developed by: Whoopi Goldberg	December 14, 2003
84	18	"Ears, Ho's and Threat"	Jerry London	Ayanna Floyd; Developed by: Whoopi Goldberg	January 11, 2004
85	19	"Weights and Measures"	John Perrin Flynn	Rick Alexander; Developed by: Whoopi Goldberg	January 18, 2004
86	20	"The Real World Rittenhouse"	Dave Thomas	Laura Wolner; Developed by: Whoopi Goldberg	January 25, 2004
87	21	"Identity Crisis"	Joe Napolitano	Developed by: Whoopi Goldberg	February 8, 2004
88	22	"Quarantine"	John Perrin Flynn	Rick Alexander; Developed by: Whoopi Goldberg	February 15, 2004

=== Season 5 (2004–05) ===
No. overall	No. in season	Title	Directed by	Written by	Original release date
89	1	"Positive Results"	Dave Thomas	Developed by: Whoopi Goldberg	June 13, 2004
90	2	"Touched by an Idol"	David Solomon	Laura Wolner; Developed by: Whoopi Goldberg	June 20, 2004
91	3	"Omissions"	Oz Scott	Carla Kettner; Developed by: Whoopi Goldberg	June 27, 2004
92	4	"Cape Cancer"	Allison Liddi-Brown	Kathryn Pratt; Developed by: Whoopi Goldberg	July 11, 2004
93	5	"Fractured"	Philip Casnoff	Developed by: Whoopi Goldberg	July 18, 2004
94	6	"Goodbye Slash Rest in Peace"	John Perrin Flynn	Developed by: Whoopi Goldberg	July 25, 2004
95	7	"Healing Touch"	Dave Thomas	Developed by: Whoopi Goldberg	August 1, 2004
96	8	"Bleeding Heart"	Philip Casnoff	Laura Wolner; Developed by: Whoopi Goldberg	August 8, 2004
97	9	"Prophylactic Measures"	Anthony Cowley	Carla Kettner; Developed by: Whoopi Goldberg	August 15, 2004
98	10	"Life in the Balance"	Jerry London	Jeremy R. Littman; Developed by: Whoopi Goldberg	August 22, 2004
99	11	"Like Cures Like"	Fran Drescher	Jordan Hawley & William Schifrin; Developed by: Whoopi Goldberg	September 26, 2004
100	12	"Cinderella in Scrubs"	John Perrin Flynn	Tammy Ader; Developed by: Whoopi Goldberg	October 3, 2004
101	13	"Body Mass Increase"	Joe Napolitano	Diane Messina Stanley & James Stanley; Developed by: Whoopi Goldberg	October 10, 2004
102	14	"Selective Breeding"	Craig Ross Jr.	Laura Wolner; Developed by: Whoopi Goldberg	October 17, 2004
103	15	"A Dose of Reality"	Ronit Ravich-Bross	Kathryn Pratt; Developed by: Whoopi Goldberg	October 24, 2004
104	16	"Graft"	Allison Liddi-Brown	Kathryn Pratt; Developed by: Whoopi Goldberg	October 31, 2004
105	17	"Code"	Jan Eliasberg	Carla Kettner; Developed by: Whoopi Goldberg	December 5, 2004
106	18	"Virgin Birth"	Philip Casnoff	Laura Wolner	December 12, 2004
107	19	"Foreign Bodies"	Philip Casnoff & Joe De Oliveria	Carla Kettner	January 9, 2005
108	20	"First Response"	Dave Thomas	Developed by: Whoopi Goldberg	January 16, 2005
109	21	"Implants, Transplants and Cuban Aunts"	Dave Thomas	Developed by: Whoopi Goldberg	January 23, 2005
110	22	"Cutting the Cord"	Joe Napolitano	Developed by: Whoopi Goldberg	January 30, 2005

=== Season 6 (2005–06) ===
No. overall	No. in season	Title	Directed by	Written by	Original release date
111	1	"New Blood"	John Perrin Flynn	Developed by: Whoopi Goldberg	June 12, 2005
112	2	"Feeling No Pain"	Joe Napolitano	Developed by: Whoopi Goldberg	June 19, 2005
113	3	"Clinical Risk"	Dave Thomas	Developed by: Whoopi Goldberg	June 26, 2005
114	4	"Differentials"	Anthony Cowley	Developed by: Whoopi Goldberg	July 10, 2005
115	5	"Dying Inside"	John Perrin Flynn	Developed by: Whoopi Goldberg	July 17, 2005
116	6	"The Y Factor"	Joe Napolitano	Darin Goldberg & Shelley Meals; Developed by: Whoopi Goldberg	July 24, 2005
117	7	"Paternity Test"	Julia Rask	Developed by: Whoopi Goldberg	August 7, 2005
118	8	"Infectious Love"	Dave Thomas	Developed by: Whoopi Goldberg	August 14, 2005
119	9	"Gunshot Wedding"	John Perrin Flynn	Developed by: Whoopi Goldberg	August 21, 2005
120	10	"Family Practice"	Dave Thomas	Developed by: Whoopi Goldberg	August 28, 2005
121	11	"Broken Hearts"	Farhad Mann	Developed by: Whoopi Goldberg	September 11, 2005
122	12	"It Takes a Clinic"	Catherine Jelski	Darin Goldberg & Shelley Meals; Developed by: Whoopi Goldberg	September 18, 2005
123	13	"Agony and Ecstasy"	Anthony Cowley	Developed by: Whoopi Goldberg	September 25, 2005
124	14	"Chief Complaints"	Dave Thomas	Developed by: Whoopi Goldberg	October 2, 2005
125	15	"Promising Treatment"	Julia Rask	Developed by: Whoopi Goldberg	October 9, 2005
126	16	"Rhythm of the Heart"	Philip Casnoff	Darin Goldberg & Shelley Meals; Developed by: Whoopi Goldberg	October 16, 2005
127	17	"We Wish You a Merry Cryst-Meth"	Jerry London	Ashley Gable, Darin Goldberg & Shelley Meals; Developed by: Whoopi Goldberg	December 11, 2005
128	18	"My Sister, My Doctor, Myself"	Rick Schroder	Developed by: Whoopi Goldberg	January 8, 2006
129	19	"Unorthodox Treatment"	Joshua Coxx	Developed By Whoopi Goldberg	January 15, 2006
130	20	"Baby BOOM!"	Joe Napolitano	Darin Goldberg & Shelley Meals; Developed by: Whoopi Goldberg	January 22, 2006
131	21	"Dr. Thornton Hears a Who?"	Oz Scott	Developed by: Whoopi Goldberg	January 29, 2006
132	22	"Special Delivery"	Joe Napolitano	James Stanley & Diane Messina Stanley; Developed by: Whoopi Goldberg	February 5, 2006
