= Strong Medicine =

American medical drama series (2000–2006)

- Genre: Medical drama
- Created by: Whoopi Goldberg; Tammy Ader
- Starring: Rosa Blasi; Janine Turner; Patricia Richardson; Chris Marquette; Jenifer Lewis; Josh Coxx; Philip Casnoff; Brennan Elliott; Tamera Mowry; Rick Schroder; Nestor Carbonell
- Composer: David Bergeaud
- Country of origin: United States
- Original language: English
- No. of seasons: 6
- No. of episodes: 132 (list of episodes)

Production
- Executive producer: Whoopi Goldberg
- Running time: 43 minutes
- Production companies: One Ho Productions; By the Lake Productions; Sony Pictures Television (Note: Credited as Columbia TriStar Television Distribution (2000–2001; seasons 1–2) and Columbia TriStar Domestic Television (2001–2002; seasons 2–3).)

Original release
- Network: Lifetime
- Release: July 23, 2000 – February 5, 2006

Strong Medicine is an American medical drama with a focus on feminist politics, health issues and class conflict that aired on Lifetime from July 23, 2000, to February 5, 2006. It was created and produced in part by Whoopi Goldberg, who made cameos on the series, and by Tammy Ader. It starred Rosa Blasi, Janine Turner, and Patricia Richardson. It was the highest-rated original drama on basic cable in 2001.

== Overview ==
Strong Medicine brings together the worlds of two completely different doctors, Dr. Luisa "Lu" Delgado, and Dr. Dana Stowe. Lu is a single mother running a free clinic in the inner city. Dana is a Harvard graduate and top female health specialist. The two come together when Dr. Lydia Emerson wants to combine Rittenhouse Hospital's practice with Lu's financially failing clinic to provide the best care for the patients of both doctors.

The staff and its visitors tend to be racially, politically, and economically diverse. A core class/political duality in the episodes' storylines tend to be driven by comparisons and contrasts (and often cooperation) between liberal Delgado, and her fellow women's health practitioner across the lobby, who sees paying patients and generally has more conservative values. When Dr. Dana Stowe leaves, Lu's partners include Dr. Andy Campbell and Dr. Dylan West. The show often places the characters in ironic, soul-searching situations in which they are forced to question the solidity of their personal beliefs or else cause them to fight for what they believe in.

== Episodes ==
Season	Episodes	Originally released	
Season	Episodes	First released	Last released
1	22	July 23, 2000	March 11, 2001
2	22	July 15, 2001	March 3, 2002
3	22	July 21, 2002	March 16, 2003
4	22	June 15, 2003	February 15, 2004
5	22	June 13, 2004	January 30, 2005
6	22	June 12, 2005	February 5, 2006

== Cast and characters ==
=== Main ===
- Rosa Blasi as Dr. Luisa "Lu" Magdalena Delgado, born November 18, 1970. Delgado runs the free clinic (first the South Philly Health Clinic and, since the pilot, the Rittenhouse Health Center), and hosts a support group. Both as a friend and a doctor to many lower-class patients, Lu regularly comes face-to-face with bitterly ironic situations involving the difficulties of the lower class with government, debt, drug abuse, and exploitation. Her character exhibits a perennial cleverness which allows her to wheedle or persuade positive outcomes from seemingly hopeless cases of victimization. After her mother died of breast cancer when she was ten years-old, she was raised by her grandmother, Isabel Santana, who now lives in Puerto Rico. Lu has a son, Marc, who she had when she was 16 and raised alone. Until recently, Delgado has had no luck with a relationship. Her first boyfriend, Jack (Jeffrey D. Sams) a construction worker, dumped her, because he wasn't ready to get involved in a fatherly (or even father figure) relationship with Lu's son Marc. Lu's next boyfriend, radio show host Harry Burr (Don Michael Paul) had to leave her because his ex-wife was using their relationship to gain custody of his daughter Erin, who was also her son Marc's girlfriend. Soon after, she survived being raped by the Rittenhouse's new Head of Surgery, Dr. Randolf Kilner. She lost her first serious boyfriend, fireman Miguel "Mickey" Arenas (Julien Acosta), to a murder perpetrated by one of her patients, forcing her to face her moral objection to the death penalty. Ironically, in an earlier episode, Lu thought Miguel had died on the job, when there was a fire at the local mall. It turns out the only reason he didn't die, is because he switched duties with friend and ended up driving the fire truck. Lu later becomes involved with Ben Sanderson (Grant Show), an administrator brought on after Rittenhouse is bought by a health care conglomerate, Octavian Systems. Sanderson later left to be reassigned to a facility in Miami. He asked Lu to come with him but, after thinking about it, she refused because her patients are there, and the constant travel makes it difficult to put down roots. Soon after, she became involved with Jonas Rey (Nestor Carbonell), a local self-made millionaire with a good heart but a large soulless corporation. In the final season, she and Jonas get married, and Lu struggles to get accustomed to a wealthier life, while trying to reconcile it with her inner-city loyalties. After Lu discovered she was pregnant with Jonas' baby, Jonas is plagued by an embezzlement scandal at his company, bringing his fortune into doubt. In the series finale, they decided to move to Jonas' childhood home, but while he was showing it to Lu, they were affected by an explosion and got caught in the ruined basement. Lu was injured and her placenta detached. She asked Jonas to perform an emergency C-Section to save her and the baby, but she fainted during the procedure. Luckily, the firemen arrived and called Dylan, who completed the C-Section, and Lu gave birth to their daughter, who was named Milagro (which means "miracle" in Spanish).
- Janine Turner as Dr. Dana Lee Stowe (seasons 1–3), an ambitious doctor and scientist seeking a cure for breast cancer; she is rigid and stoic, but cares deeply about her patients. Like her successor Andy Campbell, she was good friends with Jackson. She had a short-lived relationship with resident doctor Nick Biancavilla, which she broke up when he wasn't willing to have children. Her character left the show near the start of the third season after adopting two challenged children (an HIV-positive infant and her older sister), choosing to put her medical ambitions aside to pursue a successful motherhood.
- Patricia Richardson as Dr. Andy Campbell (seasons 3–5), a former military doctor with the rank of Colonel, came on the staff during the third season to replace the much more ambitious and strict Dr. Dana Stowe. She is a general surgeon, and a West Point graduate, with a 27 year career. Before moving to Philadelphia, she was the Chief Medical Officer of the Army in Afghanistan. She is fluent in French, Dutch, German, Italian, and Tagalog (regional language of the Philippines). She also knows some Russian, and Japanese. Because of her father's military career (he retired as a General in the army), she moved frequently throughout her childhood. She lived in Germany as a child, and went to 9 different schools in 12 years. Andy signed up for the Army Reserves after resigning her commission, helping bring in new ROTC recruits at a local college. Her patients tend to be upper-middle-class, and often include minor local celebrities and professionals. Her character ostensibly lives the almost typical suburban nuclear family lifestyle, aside from her status as breadwinner. She has two teenage daughters, Jesse and Lizzy. Campbell kicked out her husband, Leslie, after he hit her during a domestic dispute, forcing her to examine domestic abuse issues as well as single motherhood. Campbell and Leslie had been married for thirty years without any violence in the home, and Leslie is presented as changing from a loving husband to a violent maniac over the course of a single episode. She later becomes involved with another doctor, cardiac surgeon Dr. Milo Morton but he dies in a car accident (a development forced by the death of actor Richard Biggs due to an undiagnosed heart condition). Campbell was named United States Surgeon General (which was also a stated ambition of her predecessor) at the end of the fifth season and left the show.
- Chris Marquette as Marco Antonio "Marc" Delgado (seasons 1–5; guest season 6), Lu's teenage son, whom she had when she was a teenager. He lived with his mother, but saw his father Bill (who was married with young twin girls) regularly. He once saved his great-grandmother Isabel Santana's life with a bone marrow transplant. He is a loyal, caring son and friend, sometimes, at his own expense, taking after his mother. He left for college in Tucson in the middle of the fifth season, after graduating one year in advance. He returned to Philadelphia due to a pregnancy scare with a former girlfriend, Olivia, and again for Lu's wedding, and walked her to the altar.
- Jenifer Lewis as Lana Hawkins serves as the front receptionist for the RWHC, or the Rittenhouse Women's Health Center. A former drug addict and streetwalker long since rehabilitated, she met Lu at the same bar Peter and his band were playing at. After a fire destroyed the bar and the owner rented the locale to Lu for her clinic, she gave Lana a job. She has two sons, Harry, an officer in the Navy and Maurice, a con artist who once pretended he had a wife and son to trick his mother out of money. Hawkins is the hospital's eyes and ears, i.e. chief gossip, as well as matchmaker, and general benevolent schemer and rule-bender. Lana often refers to herself in the third person. Lana returned to school, earned her high school diploma and went to college, earning a degree in psychology. Afterwards, Lu enlisted her to consult for her women's group, as volunteer work towards her Master's degree. She was maid of honor at Lu's wedding.
- Josh Coxx as Peter James Riggs. A nurse practitioner, registered nurse, and midwife, Peter is generally progressive, open-minded, and an eager advice-giver. He is a vegetarian, practices Buddhism, and believes in the principles of holistic medicine. He is often a kindred spirit to Delgado. He grew up poor, with an abusive, alcoholic father. He was in the Peace Corps, and has volunteered with the American Red Cross, his work taking him to impoverished countries, such as Nicaragua. Often, Riggs' character makes a balanced sociopolitical observation that influences a positive action by one of the two doctors; other times he is the protagonist of action. He was also the nurse union representative. When he met Lu, he almost ran over her with his van. He played the bass guitar in a band until his girlfriend Simone (the lead singer) dumped him during a fire, and Lu gave him a job in her new free clinic. Often shown as a ladies man with several girlfriends (ironically, his mother is convinced he's gay due to his vocation), he finally has settled into a relationship with Kayla, to whom he proposes in the series finale.
- Philip Casnoff as Dr. Robert "Bob" Jackson (seasons 1–5). Chief of staff of Rittenhouse Hospital, he is the stoic, administrative figure and also ultimately in charge of decisions regarding funding, especially to the women's clinic. Jackson had once been a top surgeon but when a young girl died during surgery due to a mislabeled drug dosage, Jackson lost his nerve for the operating room and moved to administration. Jackson considers himself a personal friend of Dr. Campbell (as he was with Dr. Stowe), but generally is more impersonal and sometimes butts heads with Dr. Delgado over financial or liability issues, and with Lana over administrative issues. He was married with two daughters, Lauren and Paige. A recurring subplot throughout the series was Jackson dealing with his wife Susan's advancing MS condition. He even briefly left her, but eventually returned to her. Jackson's character was laid off by hospital owner Octavian prior to the start of the final season.
- Brennan Elliott as Dr. Nicholas "Nick" Biancavilla (seasons 2–4; recurring season 1; guest season 6), an ER doctor at Rittenhouse who had a brief relationship with Dr. Stowe. He has four older sisters—one of whom is Francine Biancavilla, a lesbian whose life-partner he married in order to get her the critical medical care she desperately needed. Dr. Jackson found out, but Nick gave Francine a medical insurance plan as a wedding gift that covered existing illnesses. Nick left at the end of the fourth season when he transferred to Manhattan General, but returned for a guest appearance in the final season.
- Tamera Mowry as Dr. Kayla Thornton (seasons 5–6). A new doctor and young medical prodigy, Thornton is a fast study at Rittenhouse, entering residency in the beginning of the fifth season and becoming a depended-upon ER regular by the end of that season, despite occasional disbelief by patients that she is a qualified doctor. As she becomes a main character to the show, her personality can be compared to that of a young Dr. Delgado with her ambition and hard work. She decided to become a doctor as a young girl when a brother was shot in the chest by a friend when playing with a hunting rifle. While the friend ran for help, Kayla cradled her dying brother. The nearest doctor was 25 miles away, so therefore Kayla's brother died in her arms. She then decided to become a doctor. Throughout the medical drama's seasons, Thornton rooms with various fellow staff members in her search for affordable housing. First she moves into Dr. Campbell's house, where she spends some of her time helping with Andy's two daughters. After Andy's departure, she rooms with Lana. She was later on selected as Chief Resident after narrowly missing it due to a complex emergency house call. We find out that she has a twin sister, Keisha (played by real-life twin sister Tia Mowry) who ends up needing 24-hour care for schizophrenia.
- Rick Schroder as Dr. Dylan West (season 6). Replacing Dr. Campbell's role is Dr. Dylan West, a male women's health specialist. His gender raises initial eyebrows, especially with Delgado, who has also had past negative experiences with him as a resident. He has his own troubled past and seems to be seeking to redeem himself from something in his past. He is a diabetic, which becomes a recurring plot device. Dylan has tremendously bad luck in romance. One such former love interest arrives at Rittenhouse needing a new heart to survive; West is unable to save her life, but gains a teenaged half-Japanese daughter, Araya (Eileen Boylan), he never knew he had. His relationship with his daughter is troubled at first, but slowly they get to know each other.
- Nestor Carbonell as Jonas Rey (season 6; recurring season 5). A local self-made billionaire with a good heart but a large soulless corporation. He first appeared on Rittenhouse when his mother was brought to ER due an accident. While his mother was in the hospital, he saw Lu interacting with several of her patients. Even before he exchanged a single word with Lu, he told his mother he'll marry her. He met and pursued Lu until she agreed to date him. They got married in the middle of the final season. After personally bringing sick South American children to Rittenhouse for treatment, Jonas is plagued by an embezzlement scandal at his company, bringing his fortune and stability into doubt. After discovering that Lana had stock of his company, he decided to sell most of his assets and pay the shareholders back a part of their money. He and Lu moved to his childhood home, but while he was showing it to Lu, they were affected by an explosion and got caught in the ruined basement. Lu convinced him to perform an emergency C-Section to save her and the baby, but she fainted during the procedure. Luckily, Dylan arrives to deliver their daughter.

=== Recurring ===
- Whoopi Goldberg as Dr. Lydia Emerson
- Grant Show as Ben Sanderson
- Gregory Harrison as Dr. Randolf Kilner
- Julian Acosta as Miguel Arenas
- Richard Biggs as Dr. Milo Morton
- Morgan Flynn as Lizzy Campbell
- Michelle Horn as Jesse Campbell
- Matthew Yang King as Dr. Matt Linn
- Brian Kerwin as Les Campbell

== Broadcast and release ==
The American over-the-air network Start TV currently airs the show, re-adding it on September 30, 2024, airing every morning at 6am ET.

On January 10, 2006, Sony Pictures Home Entertainment released Strong Medicine: The Complete First Season, a 5-disc set. As of 2025, it's the only season to have a media release as no other seasons have been released on DVD. In April 2021, the first two seasons of the show were available to watch on the free ad-supported streaming service Tubi in the United States, but is no longer offered as of April 1, 2023. Sometime later in 2025, it has been re-added on Tubi and on The Roku Channel streaming service, and is streaming all six seasons, except for a few episodes are missing from seasons 5 and 6, due to licensing agreements, content rights shifting, or providers rotating shows in and out. The complete series was also available to watch in Canada on CTV.ca's CTV Throwback hub, until it was recently removed.

== Proposed First Response spin-off and international remake ==
Near the end of the 2004–2005 season, a special episode "First Response" aired, prominently featuring three new characters: Katie and Zack, both EMTs, and Dr. Vanessa Burke, head of the new Rittenhouse Trauma Center and adopted black sister of Katie. The TV Home website reports that this episode was meant as the pilot to a potential Strong Medicine spin-off series, Strong Medicine: First Response. Such a series would have been the first spin-off to an existing Lifetime original series. Lifetime did not order the new series into production after the ratings for the pilot were not what was expected.

There was a Russian remake in 2012.
