= Josh Coxx =

American film and television actor

- Born: April 9, 1964 (age 62)
- Education: State University of New York
- Occupations: Film and television actor

Josh Coxx (born April 9, 1964) is an American film and television actor. He is best known for playing nurse practitioner Peter James Riggs in the American medical drama television series Strong Medicine.

== Life and career ==
Coxx was born on April 9, 1964. He attended and graduated from the State University of New York. He began his screen career in 1985, playing the sixth Daniel Wolek in the ABC soap opera television series One Life to Live until 1986, when he was fired. In 1988, he appeared in the syndicated horror anthology television series Freddy's Nightmares.

Later in his career, in 2000, Coxx starred as nurse practitioner Peter James Riggs in the Lifetime medical drama television series Strong Medicine, starring along with Janine Turner, Rosa Blasi, Chris Marquette, Jenifer Lewis and Philip Casnoff. After the series ended in 2006, he guest-starred in television programs including Quantum Leap, 21 Jump Street, Friends, NYPD Blue, The Mentalist, The Burning Zone and Providence, and played the recurring role of Lt. David Corwin in the space opera television series Babylon 5. He also appeared in films such as Thor, The Last House on the Left and Drop Dead Gorgeous.

In 2020, Coxx played Brendan Byrne, the brother of Neil Byrne (Joe Flanigan), in the ABC soap opera television series General Hospital. He reprised his role again in 2022.

== Personal life ==
According to the New York Daily News, Coxx is a trained rescue diver in Australia.
