= Michael Palance =

American actor and producer

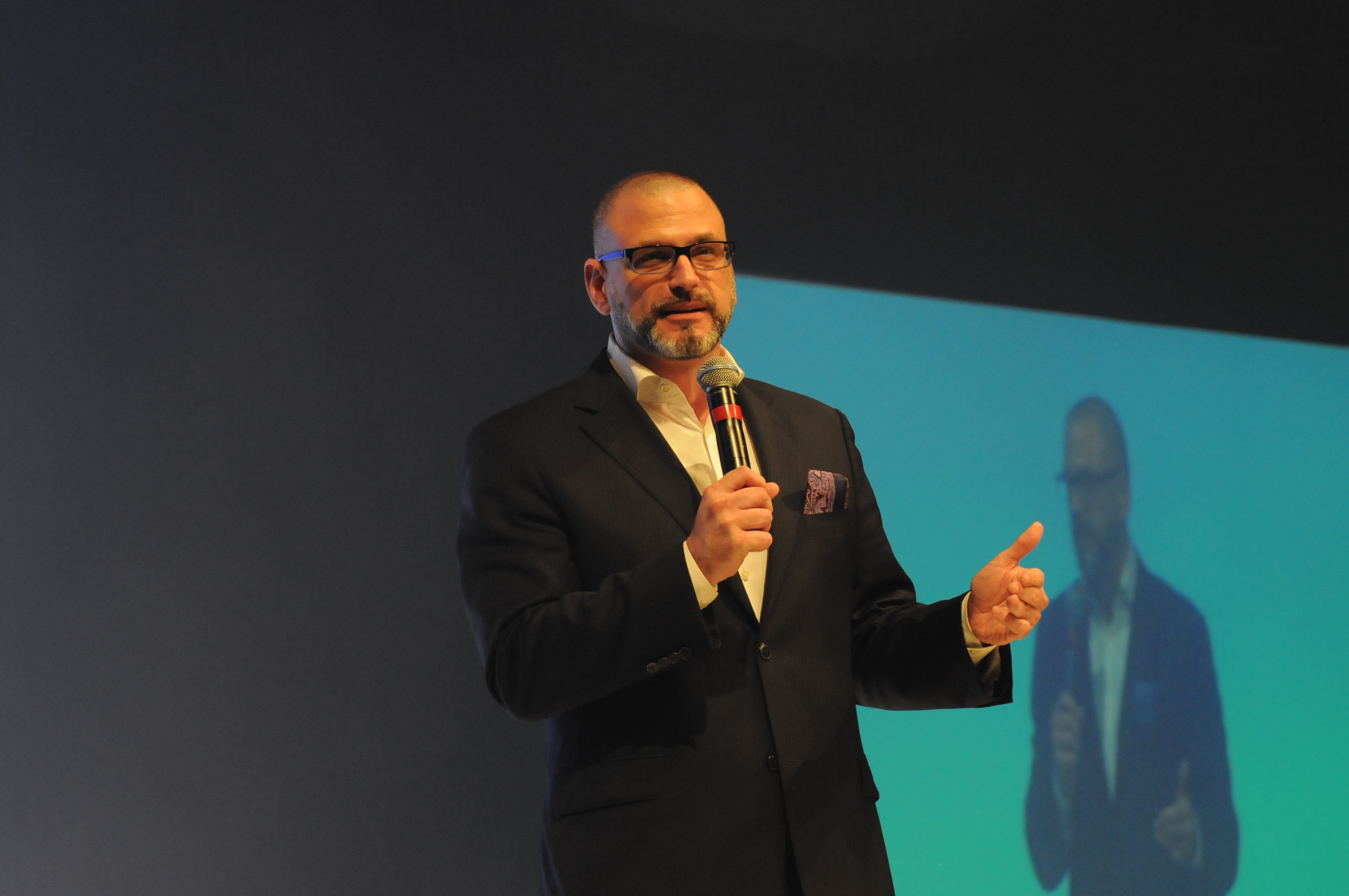
- Michael Palance speaking at a conference in 2014
- Born: Michael David Palance; March 27, 1970 (age 56); Long Island, New York
- Occupations: Actor, director

Michael David Palance (born March 27, 1970) is an American actor, producer, and talent showcase company operator. He started acting as a teenager, and his early work included daytime soap operas, such as playing the characters Daniel Wolek on One Life to Live (1989–91) and Robert Rowan on Ryan's Hope (1988–89). He also appeared in the 1995 martial arts film Savate. Palance has been associated with several talent showcase companies, including "The", "ACT", "New York Studio" (NYS) and "Premiere Event", which have faced criticism and legal scrutiny over their business practices. These organizations have been accused of employing high-pressure sales tactics, making misleading claims about affiliations with major entertainment companies, and charging substantial fees to aspiring performers and their families. In December 2020, he shifted his focus to launching Premiere, a family-friendly production company and streaming service.

== Early life ==
Palance was born in Long Island, New York. He began studying acting at age 15, taking acting classes at Massapequa High School, which he graduated from in 1988. A friend of the family suggested that he might try doing some modeling, and this idea led the way to acting. His initial training focused on stage work, and he started working professionally during the 1980s in New York theater and film.

== Career ==
His work in daytime soap operas led him to move to Los Angeles in the early 1990s where he made appearances in episodes of Murder She Wrote, Robin's Hoods, University Hospital and All American Girl.

In 2013 he produced the film Pop Star, which starred Christian Serratos, Rachele Brooke Smith, and Ross Thomas.

== Talent showcase companies, criticisms and lawsuits ==
In 2012, the Los Angeles Times reported that the Academy of Cinema and Television (ACT) and its successor, "The", were criticized for their business practices. The Better Business Bureaus in Phoenix, St. Louis, and Alaska issued warnings about "The", citing its history of complaints and legal issues. New York Studio sued the bureaus, claiming the actions were from previous owners. New York Studio, owned by Palance, claimed to have improved "The's" reputation, but eventually dropped its lawsuits against the Better Business Bureaus.

In 2012, Michael Palance's company, "The Event", conducted auditions in Auckland, New Zealand, attracting hundreds of aspiring performers aged 6 to 18. Participants were encouraged to sign up for talent showcase programs with fees ranging from US$1,950 for two showcases to US$7,900 for ten, for the opportunity to perform before industry professionals at the Walt Disney World Swan and Dolphin resort in Orlando, Florida (a hotel resort not owned by The Walt Disney Company). Some parents expressed surprise at the costs, with one saying "We didn't really know we had to pay money," and "It seems a bit like network marketing and they want the money tomorrow." Palance defended the company's model, stating that it was a global scouting organization and that "in life you get what you pay for".
