= Thor (film) =

2011 Marvel Studios film

- Theatrical release poster
- Directed by: Kenneth Branagh
- Screenplay by: Ashley Edward Miller; Zack Stentz; Don Payne
- Story by: J. Michael Straczynski; Mark Protosevich
- Based on: Thor by: Stan Lee; Larry Lieber; Jack Kirby
- Produced by: Kevin Feige
- Starring: Chris Hemsworth; Natalie Portman; Tom Hiddleston; Stellan Skarsgård; Kat Dennings; Clark Gregg; Colm Feore; Ray Stevenson; Idris Elba; Jaimie Alexander; Rene Russo; Anthony Hopkins
- Cinematography: Haris Zambarloukos
- Edited by: Paul Rubell
- Music by: Patrick Doyle
- Production company: Marvel Studios
- Distributed by: Paramount Pictures (Note: In July 2013, the film's distribution rights were transferred from Paramount Pictures to Walt Disney Studios Motion Pictures.)
- Release dates: April 17, 2011 (Sydney); May 6, 2011 (United States)
- Running time: 114 minutes
- Country: United States
- Language: English
- Budget: $150 million
- Box office: $449.3 million

Thor is a 2011 American superhero film based on the Marvel Comics character Thor. Produced by Marvel Studios and distributed by Paramount Pictures, it is the fourth film in the Marvel Cinematic Universe (MCU). It was directed by Kenneth Branagh, written by the writing team of Ashley Edward Miller and Zack Stentz along with Don Payne, and stars Chris Hemsworth as Thor alongside Natalie Portman, Tom Hiddleston, Stellan Skarsgård, Kat Dennings, Clark Gregg, Colm Feore, Ray Stevenson, Idris Elba, Jaimie Alexander, Rene Russo, and Anthony Hopkins. After reigniting a dormant war, Thor is banished from Asgard to Earth, stripped of his powers and his hammer Mjölnir. As his brother Loki (Hiddleston) plots to take the Asgardian throne, Thor must prove himself worthy.

Sam Raimi first developed the concept of a film adaptation based on Thor in 1991, but soon abandoned the project, leaving it in "development hell" for several years. During this time, the rights were picked up by various film studios until Marvel signed Mark Protosevich to develop the project in 2006, and planned to finance and release it through Paramount. Matthew Vaughn was assigned to direct the film for a tentative 2010 release. However, after Vaughn was released from his holding deal in 2008, Branagh was approached and the film's release was rescheduled to 2011. The main characters were cast in 2009, and principal photography took place in California and New Mexico from January to May 2010. The film was converted to 3D in post-production.

Thor premiered in Sydney on April 17, 2011, and was released in the United States on May 6, as part of Phase One of the MCU. It received generally positive reviews from critics and was a financial success, earning $449.3 million worldwide. Three sequels have been released: Thor: The Dark World (2013), Thor: Ragnarok (2017), and Thor: Love and Thunder (2022).

== Plot ==
In 965 AD, Odin, king of Asgard, wages war against the Frost Giants of Jotunheim and their leader Laufey, to prevent them from conquering the Nine Realms, starting with Earth. The Asgardians defeat the Frost Giants and seize the source of their power, the Casket of Ancient Winters.

In the present, (Note: According to the book The Marvel Cinematic Universe: An Official Timeline (2023), the film takes place in early 2010, simultaneously with the events of The Incredible Hulk (2008) and Iron Man 2 (2010).) Odin's son Thor prepares to ascend to the throne of Asgard but is interrupted when Frost Giants, secretly allowed in by his brother Loki, attempt to retrieve the Casket. Against Odin's order, Thor travels to Jotunheim to confront Laufey, accompanied by Loki, childhood friend Sif and the Warriors Three: Volstagg, Fandral, and Hogun. A battle ensues until Odin intervenes to save the Asgardians, destroying the fragile truce between the two races. As punishment for Thor's arrogance, Odin deems his son unworthy and strips his powers before exiling him to Earth as a mortal, accompanied by his hammer Mjölnir, now protected by an enchantment that allows only the worthy to wield it.

Thor lands in New Mexico, where astrophysicist Dr. Jane Foster, her assistant Darcy Lewis, and mentor Dr. Erik Selvig find him. The local populace discovers Mjölnir, which S.H.I.E.L.D. agent Phil Coulson soon commandeers before forcibly acquiring Foster's data about the wormhole that delivered Thor to Earth. Having learned about Mjölnir's nearby location, Thor seeks to retrieve it from the facility that S.H.I.E.L.D. has constructed and tries to lift it, but is unable to do so and is captured. With Selvig's help, he is freed and resigns himself to exile on Earth as he develops a romance with Foster.

Loki discovers that he is Laufey's biological son, adopted by Odin after the war ended. Loki confronts Odin, who wearily falls into the deep "Odinsleep" to recover his strength. Loki takes the throne in Odin's stead and offers Laufey the chance to kill Odin and retrieve the Casket. Sif and the Warriors Three, unhappy with Loki's rule, attempt to return Thor from exile, convincing Heimdall, gatekeeper of the Bifröst—the means of traveling between worlds—to allow them passage to Earth. Aware and suspicious of their plan, Loki sends the Destroyer, a seemingly indestructible automaton, to pursue them and kill Thor. The warriors find Thor, but the Destroyer attacks and overpowers them, prompting Thor to offer himself instead. Struck by the Destroyer and near death, Thor proves himself worthy to wield Mjölnir. The hammer returns to him, restoring his powers and enabling him to defeat the Destroyer. Thor and Jane kiss each other goodbye before he leaves with his fellow Asgardians to confront Loki.

In Asgard, Loki betrays and kills Laufey. Thor arrives, and Loki reveals his plan to destroy Jotunheim with the Bifröst Bridge. Thor fights Loki before destroying the Bifröst Bridge to stop Loki's plan. Odin awakens and prevents the brothers from falling into the abyss created in the wake of the bridge's destruction; when Odin rejects Loki's pleas for approval, Loki allows himself to fall into the abyss. Thor makes amends with Odin, admitting he is not ready to be king and longs to see Jane. Meanwhile, on Earth, Foster and her team search for a way to open a portal to Asgard.

In a post-credits scene, Selvig is taken to a S.H.I.E.L.D. facility, where Nick Fury opens a briefcase and asks him to study a mysterious cube-shaped object, (Note: Identified off-screen as the Tesseract.) which Fury says may hold untold power. An invisible Loki, who survived his fall and arrived on Earth, secretly prompts Selvig to agree.

== Cast ==
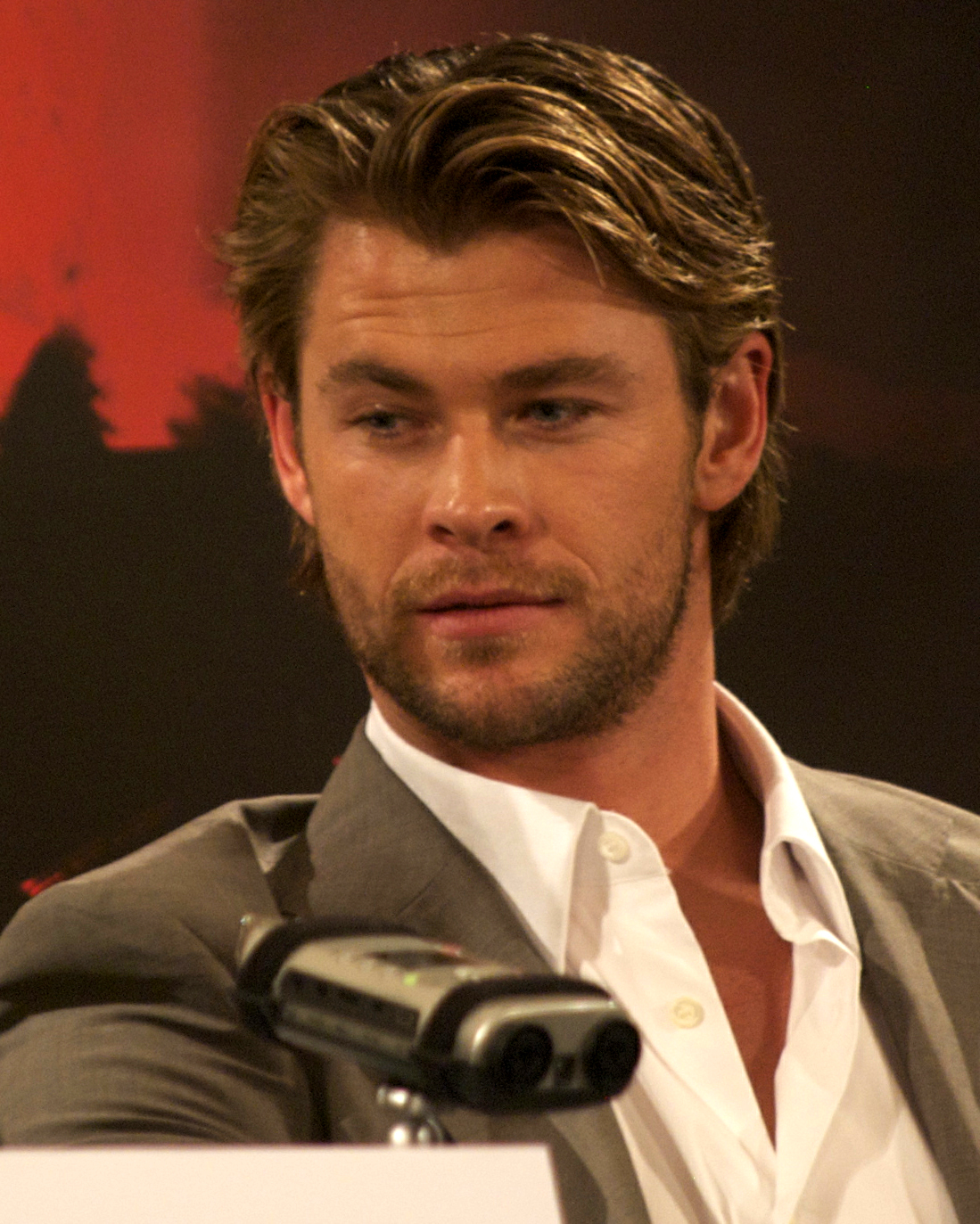
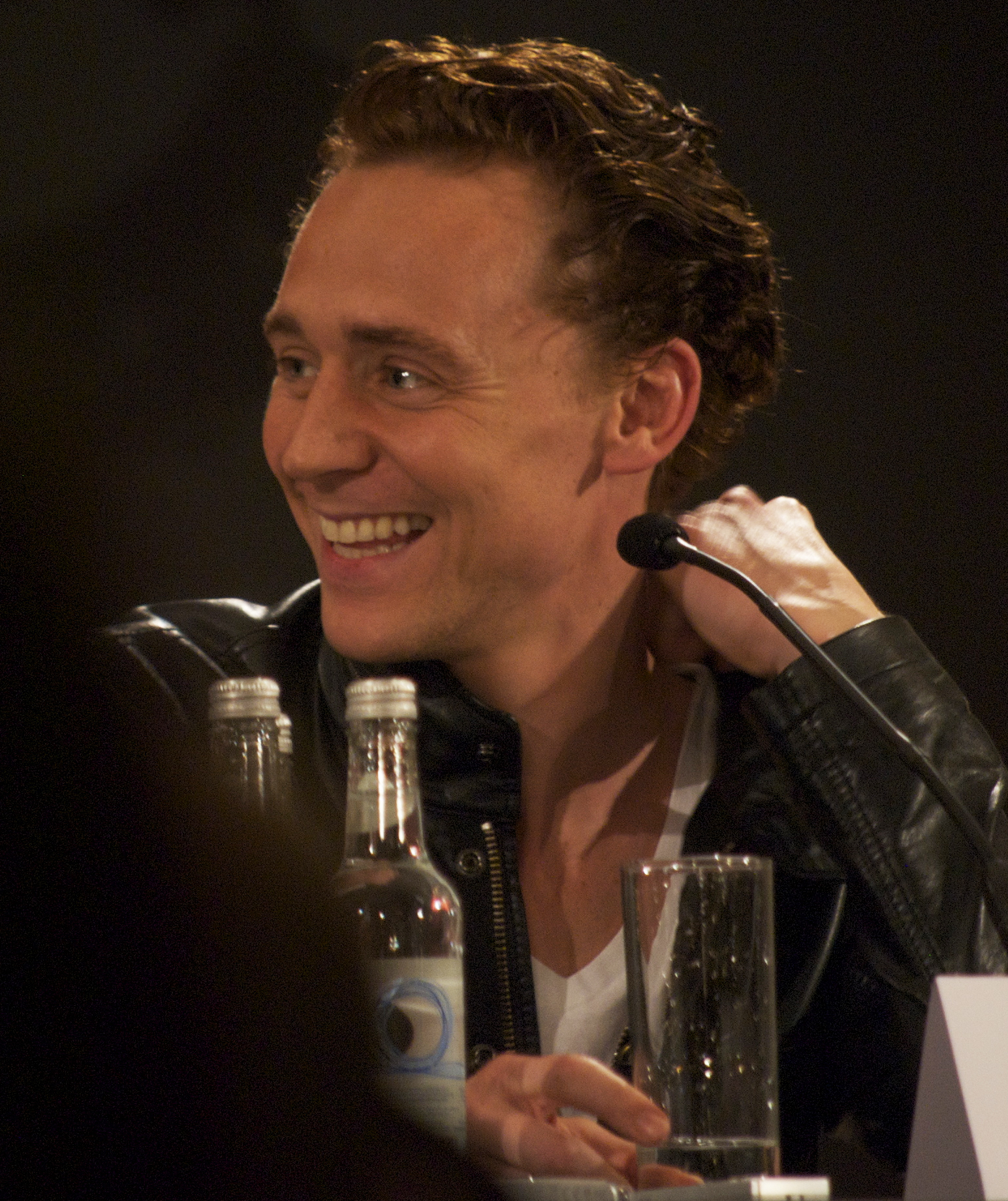
Hemsworth and Hiddleston promoting the film in London in April 2011
- Chris Hemsworth as Thor:
  The crown prince of Asgard, based on the Norse mythological deity of the same name. Director Kenneth Branagh and Marvel Studios chief Kevin Feige chose Hemsworth after a back-and-forth process in which the 25-year-old actor was initially dropped from consideration and then given a second chance to read for the part. Hemsworth stated that he gained 20 pounds (9 kg) for the role by eating non-stop and revealed that "It wasn't until Thor that I started lifting weights, it was all pretty new to me." After taking an initial costume fitting, Hemsworth returned three weeks later to find it did not fit because of the mass he had cultivated in that time span. At that point, he shifted away from eating a lot of calories and training to a kettlebell workout that would maintain his muscle mass rather than continuing to add to it. Regarding his take on the character, Hemsworth said, "We just kept trying to humanize it all, and keep it very real. Look into all the research about the comic books that we could, but also bring it back to 'Who is this guy as a person, and what's his relationship with people in the individual scenes?'" About approaching Thor's fighting style, he remarked, "First, we looked at the comic books and the posturing, the way [Thor] moves and fights, and a lot of his power seems to be drawn up through the ground. We talked about boxers, you know, Mike Tyson, very low to the ground and big open chest and big shoulder swings and very sort of brutal but graceful at the same time, and then as we shot stuff things became easier." Hemsworth also adopted a British accent for the role, stating that it suited the film’s Shakespearean and mythological tone, and added that an Australian accent would have made the character resemble "Crocodile Dundee". Dakota Goyo portrays a young Thor.
- Natalie Portman as Jane Foster:
  An astrophysicist and Thor's love interest. Marvel Studios stated in an announcement that the character was updated from the comics' initial portrayal for the feature adaptation. When asked why she took the role, Portman replied, "I just thought it sounded like a weird idea because Kenneth Branagh's directing it, so I was just like, 'Kenneth Branagh doing Thor is super-weird, I've gotta do it.'" Portman stated that she really wanted to do a big effects film that emphasized character, and getting to do it with Branagh was a new way of approaching it, relative to Star Wars. Regarding her preparation for the role Portman remarked, "I signed on to do it before there was a script. And Ken, who's amazing, who is so incredible, was like, 'You can really help create this character'. I got to read all of these biographies of female scientists like Rosalind Franklin who actually discovered the DNA double helix but didn't get the credit for it. The struggles they had and the way that they thought – I was like, 'What a great opportunity, in a very big movie that is going to be seen by a lot of people, to have a woman as a scientist'. She's a very serious scientist. Because in the comic she's a nurse and now they made her an astrophysicist. Really, I know it sounds silly, but it is those little things that makes girls think it's possible. It doesn't give them a [role] model of 'Oh, I just have to dress cute in movies'".
- Tom Hiddleston as Loki:
  Thor's adoptive brother and nemesis, based on the deity of the same name. Hiddleston was chosen after previously working with Branagh on Ivanov and Wallander. Initially, Hiddleston auditioned to play Thor but Branagh decided his talent would be better harnessed playing Loki. Hiddleston stated that the character was "a comic book version of Edmund in King Lear, but nastier." Hiddleston had to keep a strict diet before the start of filming because Branagh wanted "Loki to have a lean and hungry look, like Cassius in Julius Caesar. Physically, he can't be posing as Thor". Hiddleston looked at Peter O'Toole as inspiration for Loki as well, explaining, "Interestingly enough, [Kenneth Branagh] said to look at Peter O'Toole in two specific films, The Lion in Winter and Lawrence of Arabia. What's interesting about ... his performance [as King Henry] is you see how damaged he is. There's a rawness [to his performance]; it's almost as if he's living with a layer of skin peeled away. He's grandiose and teary and, in a moment, by turns hilarious and then terrifying. What we wanted was that emotional volatility. It's a different acting style, it's not quite the same thing, but it's fascinating to go back and watch an actor as great as O'Toole head for those great high hills". Ted Allpress portrays a young Loki.
- Stellan Skarsgård as Erik Selvig:
  A scientist doing research in New Mexico who encounters Thor. Skarsgård stated that he was not initially familiar with the comic book version of Thor. As to why he took the part, Skarsgård remarked, I "chose Thor because of [director] Kenneth Branagh. The script was nice and we got to rehearse and talk to the writers and do some collaborating in the process to make it fit us. So I had a very happy time on it. What I always try to do is immediately do something I just haven't done so I get variation in my life. I've made about 90 films and if I did the same thing over and over again I would be bored by now. I try to pick different films, I go and do those big ones and having done that I can usually afford to go and do some really small obscure films and experiment a little".
- Kat Dennings as Darcy Lewis:
  A political science major who is Jane Foster's intern. Dennings described her character as Foster's "little helper gnome". Dennings stated that her role was expanded during the rehearsal process. Dennings explained, "She's kind of like a cute, clueless, little puppy or maybe a hamster. There wasn't much on the page for the Darcy role to begin with and I didn't even see a script before I took the job so I didn't really know who Darcy was at first. But she really evolved—she's so much fun now even. She's very Scooby-Doo if that makes sense. She's always three steps behind and reacting to what's happening with these great expressions ... She gets things wrong and doesn't care."
- Clark Gregg as Phil Coulson: A S.H.I.E.L.D. agent. Gregg reprises his role from the Iron Man films.
- Colm Feore as Laufey:
  King of the Frost Giants and Loki's biological father, based on the mythological being of the same name, who in myth was actually Loki's mother. Feore stated it took five hours for his makeup to be applied. About his character, Feore remarked, "I am the King of Frost Giants. And if you've seen any of the Frost Giants, you know that I am, of course, the Napoleon of Frost Giants. We've got some massive, fabulous guys who dwarf me and come in at around eight-and-a-half feet, nine feet. But, no. Can't you tell by the commanding presence? I am the boss". He said the Shakespearean training he shared with Hopkins and director Branagh helped keep production moving briskly, saying that "during the breaks, Tony, myself and Ken would be talking in Shakespearean shorthand about what the characters were doing, what we thought they may be like, and how we could focus our attention more intelligently. These were discussions that took no more than a few minutes between takes, but they allowed Ken, Tony and [me] to understand each other instantly without Ken taking an hour away to explain to the actors exactly what was going on. So that was enormously helpful."
- Ray Stevenson as Volstagg:
  A member of the Warriors Three, a group of three Asgardian adventurers who are among Thor's closest comrades, known for both his hearty appetite and wide girth. Stevenson previously worked with Kenneth Branagh in the 1998 film The Theory of Flight, and with Marvel Studios as the titular character in Punisher: War Zone. Stevenson wore a fat suit for the role, stating, "I've tried the suit on, and what they've done is kind of sex him up: he's sort of slimmer but rounder." Stevenson said, "He's got every bit of that Falstaffian verve and vigor, and a bit of a beer gut to suggest that enormous appetite, but he's not the sort of Weeble-shaped figure he is in the comics. He's Falstaff with muscles. I've got this amazing foam-injected undersuit that flexes with me."
- Idris Elba as Heimdall:
  The all-seeing, all-hearing Asgardian sentry of the bifröst bridge, based on the mythological deity of the same name. Elba said Branagh's involvement was a major incentive to take the role: "[Branagh] called me up personally and said, 'I know this isn't a big role, but I would really love to see you play it.' It's Kenneth Branagh. I was like, 'Definitely'". About the role Elba remarked, "I did green screen for the first time! I wouldn't like to do a whole movie of green screen, though. You kind of forget the plot a little—like being in a Broadway play and doing it over and over and forgetting your line halfway through". Elba stated he has made a four-picture commitment with Marvel Studios. Elba's casting prompted a proposed boycott by the Council of Conservative Citizens and a debate amongst comic book fans, some insisting it was wrong for a black man to play a Nordic god. In response Elba called the debate "ridiculous".
- Jaimie Alexander as Sif:
  A warrior and Thor's childhood friend, based on the mythological deity of the same name. Alexander was best known for her portrayal of Jessi XX on the ABC Family series Kyle XY. Alexander said that she was familiar with Marvel Comics before having taken the part, having grown up with four brothers. Alexander said the part required hours a day in the gym, though training is not unfamiliar to her, explaining she was one of few girls on her Colleyville, Texas, high-school wrestling team. Alexander described her character as "one of the guys" and that, "She's a very talented, skilled warrior and can stand on her own against any villain in the film". About her relationship with Thor she stated, "She is very loyal to Thor and cares a lot about protecting him and protecting Asgard". Alexander adopted a Received Pronunciation-style British accent for the film, and stated that Tom Hiddleston assisted her with developing the accent during production.
- Rene Russo as Frigga:
  The wife of Odin, queen of Asgard, mother of Thor, and adoptive mother of Loki, based on the mythological deity of the same name. Russo stated in March 2011 interview that she has signed on for possible sequels, although she stated that "who knows how many I'll do". Russo also used a British accent for the role, which she stated she found “horrifying” to perform in front of the 250-member crew.
- Anthony Hopkins as Odin:
  The ruler of Asgard, father of Thor, and adoptive father of Loki, based on the mythological deity of the same name. In an interview Hopkins stated he knew nothing of the comic. About the film he said, "It's a superhero movie, but with a bit of Shakespeare thrown in". Hopkins stated, "I'm very interested in that relationship between fathers and sons", and that, "My father's relationship with me was cold. He was a hot-blood character but to me, cold. When I was young, he expressed his disappointment because I was bad in school and all of that. He didn't mean any harm, but I felt I could never meet up to his expectations." Hopkins expressed that he found a personal resonance in the Odin role, saying, "He's a stern man. He's a man with purpose. I play the god who banishes his son from the kingdom of Asgard because he screwed up. He's a hot-headed, temperamental young man... probably a chip off of the old block but I decide he's not really ready to rule the future kingdom, so I banish him. I'm harsh and my wife complains and I say, 'That is why I'm king.' He's ruthless, take-it-or-leave-it. Women are much more forgiving; men are not so forgiving. I know in my life, my karma is, 'If you don't like it, tough, move on.' And I move on. I'm a little like Odin myself". In May 2016, Mel Gibson stated he was approached about the role but "didn't do it".

Additionally, Tadanobu Asano portrays Hogun, a member of the Warriors Three primarily identified by his grim demeanor and as the only member who is not an Æsir. Ray Stevenson said of Asano's character, "He doesn't speak much but when he does, everybody shuts up. But also in the healing room where everyone licks their wounds, he's the guy who just goes about his business". Josh Dallas portrays Fandral, an irrepressible swashbuckler and romantic member of the Warriors Three. Stuart Townsend was initially cast after Zachary Levi was forced to vacate the role due to a scheduling conflict. However, days before filming began, Townsend was replaced by Dallas citing "creative differences". Dallas said he believed that Fandral "would like to think of himself a philanderer. He would like to think of himself, I was saying, as the R. Kelly of Asgard. He's a lover, not a fighter". Dallas mentioned that Errol Flynn was an inspiration for the character stating, "He was a big inspiration for the character and for me. I watched a lot of his movies and kind of got that into my bones. I tried to bring out that little bit of Flynn-ness in it. Flynn had a lot of that boyish charm that Fandral's got...."

Maximiliano Hernández appears as S.H.I.E.L.D. agent Jasper Sitwell, Adriana Barraza plays diner owner Isabella Alvarez and Isaac Kappy plays a pet store clerk. Joseph Gatt, Josh Coxx, and Douglas Tait portray Frost Giants. Stan Lee and J. Michael Straczynski have cameo appearances as pick-up truck drivers, Walter Simonson has a cameo appearance as one of the guests at a large Asgardian banquet, and Samuel L. Jackson and Jeremy Renner have uncredited cameos as Nick Fury and Clint Barton / Hawkeye, respectively.

== Production ==
=== Development ===
"Thor's powers are godly, yes ... But at the end of the day, he's a man ... Odin sends him to Earth because he's not perfect. He's brash, arrogant. Even over-confident ... he also bleeds. He struggles. Life kicks him where it hurts the most ... You want to feel Thor's rage when he rages. You want to see him fight like hell, and take as much as he dishes out -- maybe more. You want to have a visceral reaction to the guy, and what happens to him. You don't want his adventures to be clean and antiseptic. You want to see the dirt, and grime and blood. You want to feel every bone crunching moment of every fight. And when he unleashes the storm, you want to feel like you're seeing the power of a GOD at work."

— Ashley Miller, co-writer of Thor, about the project

Sam Raimi originally envisioned the idea for Thor after making Darkman (1990); he met Thor co-creator Stan Lee and pitched the concept to 20th Century Fox, but they did not understand it. Thor was abandoned until April 1997, when Marvel Studios was beginning to expand rapidly. The film gained momentum after the success of X-Men (2000). The plan was for Thor to be made for television. UPN was in talks for airing it; excited by the prospect, they pushed for a script and approached Tyler Mane to play Thor. In May 2000, Marvel Studios brought Artisan Entertainment to help finance it as a film, but by June 2004 the project still had yet to be patronized by a studio. Sony Pictures Entertainment finally purchased the film rights, and in December 2004 David S. Goyer was in negotiations to write and direct. By 2005, though there were talks between Goyer and Marvel, Goyer was no longer interested, though at this point the film was still set to be distributed through Sony Pictures.

Mark Protosevich, a fan of the Thor comic book, agreed to write the script in April 2006, and the project moved to Paramount Pictures, after it acquired the rights from Sony. That year the film was announced to be a Marvel Studios production. In December 2007, Protosevich described his plans for it "to be like a superhero origin story, but not one about a human gaining super powers, but of a god realizing his true potential. It's the story of an Old Testament god who becomes a New Testament god". Protosevich's script saw Odin banishing Thor to Earth in the Middle Ages, where he becomes enslaved by Norsemen before being rescued by Lady Sif and the Warriors Three. In August 2007, Marvel Studios signed Matthew Vaughn to direct the film. Vaughn then rewrote Protosevich's script in order to bring down the budget to $150 million, as Protosevich's first draft would have cost $300 million to produce. After the success of Iron Man, Marvel Studios announced that they intended to release Thor on June 4, 2010, with Iron Man 2 being used to introduce the character of Thor.

=== Pre-production ===
"Thor, at his best, has always had a classic bent in terms of his history, the way he speaks and the often Shakespearean dramas that surround him. That kind of dialogue and character needs someone who comes from a classically trained background in order for it not to sound forced or artificial. Branagh is the perfect choice."

— J. Michael Straczynski, co-writer of Thor, on Kenneth Branagh

Vaughn was released when his holding deal expired in May 2008, at which point Marvel set Protosevich to work on a new draft and began searching for a new director. Marvel Studios also approached J. Michael Straczynski to work on an outline. Guillermo del Toro entered talks to direct the film. Del Toro was a fan of Jack Kirby's work on the comics, and said that he loved the character of Loki, but wished to incorporate more of the original Norse mythology into the film, including a "really dingy Valhalla, [with] Vikings and mud". However, del Toro ultimately turned down Thor to direct The Hobbit. By September 2008, D. J. Caruso had been discussing taking on the project, though he did not read the script. Later that month, Kenneth Branagh entered into negotiations to direct, while Daniel Craig was offered the leading role, but ultimately turned it down, citing his commitments to the James Bond franchise.

By December 2008, Branagh confirmed that he had been hired. He described it as "a human story right in the center of a big epic scenario". In February 2009, Samuel L. Jackson, who had briefly portrayed Nick Fury at the end of the film Iron Man, signed on to reprise the role in Thor as part of an unprecedented nine-picture deal with Marvel Studios. In the same month, a casting call went out looking for actors with certain physical attributes to audition for the role of Thor. Casting director Sarah Halley Finn said that casting Thor was "daunting" as the film demanded a lead actor could play "both an Asgardian god and a relatable Earth figure". Marvel Studios set back the release date of the film in March 2009 from its scheduled July 16, 2010 date to June 17, 2011. They later moved the release date to May 20, 2011, to distance the film's release from that of Captain America: The First Avenger, another Marvel Studios film that was scheduled to be released on July 22, 2011. Marvel Studios then approached television writing team Ashley Edward Miller and Zack Stentz to work on the script; they were chosen because Marvel was looking to get the script done quickly, understanding that television writers were usually able to get work done fast.

In May 2009, Chris Hemsworth was in negotiations to portray the title role after a back-and-forth process in which the 25-year-old actor was refused early on as he was initially reluctant to sign a six-picture deal, then given a second chance to read for the part. Hemsworth's brother, Liam also auditioned for the role, but was passed on by Marvel Studios head Kevin Feige. Josh Hartnett, Kevin McKidd, and Triple H were also considered for the role, while Charlie Hunnam, Alexander Skarsgård, and Joel Kinnaman were tested. Alan Ritchson auditioned, but lost the part after he failed to take the casting process seriously. Channing Tatum also auditioned. The next day, Marvel announced that Tom Hiddleston, who had worked with Branagh before and had initially been considered to portray the lead role, had been cast as Loki. Branagh stated that he hoped to begin filming in January 2010. In June 2009, Feige confirmed that both Hemsworth and Hiddleston had signed on. Feige mentioned that the film would take place on both modern day Earth and Asgard but Thor's human host, Dr. Donald Blake, would not be included.

In July 2009, Marvel announced that Natalie Portman would portray Jane Foster. Branaugh was drawn to the intelligence Portman brought to the role, while Stenz felt that "pretty much every notable Hollywood actress between the ages of twenty-five and thirty" were seen for the part. Chris Pratt auditioned for an unspecified role, but he was not cast. Jaimie Alexander and Colm Feore were reported to have joined the cast in September, with Alexander portraying Sif and Feore's role unrevealed, though it was thought to be a villain. In an interview with Swedish news site Ystads Allehanda, Stellan Skarsgård stated that he had joined the cast, though he did not specify his role. By late October Anthony Hopkins had been cast as Odin in the film. The following month, Marvel announced that they had cast the Warriors Three; Fandral was to be played by Stuart Townsend, Hogun was to be played by Tadanobu Asano and Volstagg was to be played by Ray Stevenson. Idris Elba was announced to have joined the cast, portraying Heimdall. Natalie Portman revealed that Kat Dennings would be involved in the project, portraying Darcy, a coworker of Portman's Jane Foster. Feige was inspired by The Godfather (1972) since like Thor, that film is about "fathers and sons, and it's about the actions that a father takes that his sons will have to answer for".

In December 2009, Rene Russo was cast as Frigga, Thor's mother and Odin's wife. Later that month, actors Joseph Gatt, Troy Brenna, and Josh Coxx had been cast in the film, though none of their roles were revealed. In January 2010, Adriana Barraza had joined the film's cast, in a supporting capacity. Only days before filming began, Stuart Townsend was replaced by Joshua Dallas as Fandral, citing "creative differences". When Spider-Man 4's production stalled, Paramount and Marvel Entertainment pushed up the release of Thor by two weeks to May 6, 2011.

The Science & Entertainment Exchange introduced Marvel Entertainment, Kenneth Branagh, "the screenwriter, and a few people on the design and production side of things" to three physicists (Sean Carroll, Kevin Hand, and Jim Hartle), as well as physics student Kevin Hickerson, to provide a realistic science background for the Thor universe. The consultation resulted in a change in Jane Foster's profession, from nurse to particle physicist, and the terminology (Einstein-Rosen bridge) to describe the Bifrost Bridge.

=== Filming ===
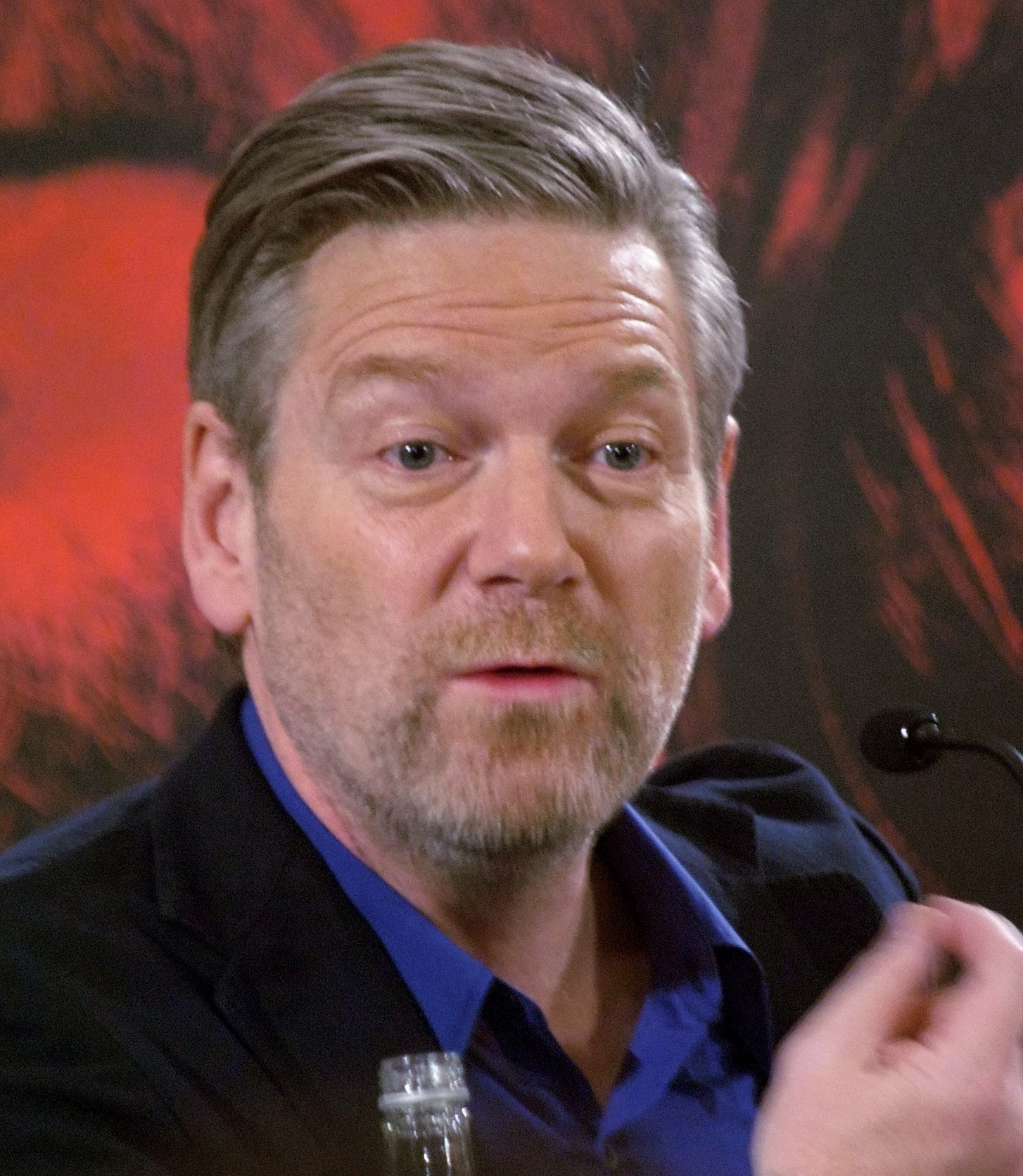
Director Kenneth Branagh promoting the film in London in April 2011

In October 2008, Marvel Studios signed a long-term lease agreement with Raleigh Studios to photograph their next four films—Iron Man 2, Thor, Captain America: The First Avenger and The Avengers—at Raleigh's Manhattan Beach, California facility. Filming on Thor was scheduled to begin in Los Angeles mid-January 2010, then move to Santa Fe, New Mexico from March until late April. Principal photography began on January 11, 2010. A few days after filming began, Clark Gregg signed on to reprise his role from Iron Man and Iron Man 2 as Agent Coulson. In February, Paramount Pictures entered negotiations with Del Mar, California to use a 300-yard stretch of beach to film a scene for Thor involving six horses running down the terrain. Paramount said this coastline was ideal because its gradual slope of sand down to the waterline creates excellent reflective opportunities on film. On March 15, 2010, production of Thor moved to Galisteo, New Mexico where Cerro Pelon Ranch, an old-fashioned Western film town, was extensively modified for the shoot.

Branagh, a fan of the comic book since childhood, commented on the challenge of bridging Asgard and the modern world: "Inspired by the comic book world both pictorially and compositionally at once, we've tried to find a way to make a virtue and a celebration of the distinction between the worlds that exist in the film but absolutely make them live in the same world. It's about finding the framing style, the color palette, finding the texture and the amount of camera movement that helps celebrate and express the differences and the distinctions in those worlds. If it succeeds, it will mark this film as different.... The combination of the primitive and the sophisticated, the ancient and the modern, I think that potentially is the exciting fusion, the exciting tension in the film".

By April, the prospect for filming parts of Thor in Del Mar, California had fallen through. Paramount Pictures sent a letter informing the city that it has instead chosen an undisclosed Northern California location to film a beachfront scene for the film. The letter cited cost concerns with moving production too far away from its headquarters. In April 2010, Jackson stated he would not be appearing in Thor, despite the claims he would with his nine-picture deal; however, later in the month he said he would be filming a scene for Thor to serve as "connective tissue" for The Avengers. During filming, Marvel Studios enlisted the help of the writers it had in its in-house writers program, including Christopher Yost and Nicole Perlman, for uncredited on-set rewrites. Perlman worked on enhancing Jane Foster's role in the film in addition to some material with Odin and Thor in the New Mexico town, while Yost, along with The Avengers writer and director Joss Whedon, wrote material for Jeremy Renner's cameo as Clint Barton / Hawkeye, the character's first appearance in the MCU. Renner's cameo was filmed in a parking lot behind a grocery store. Filming wrapped on May 6, 2010.

=== Post-production ===
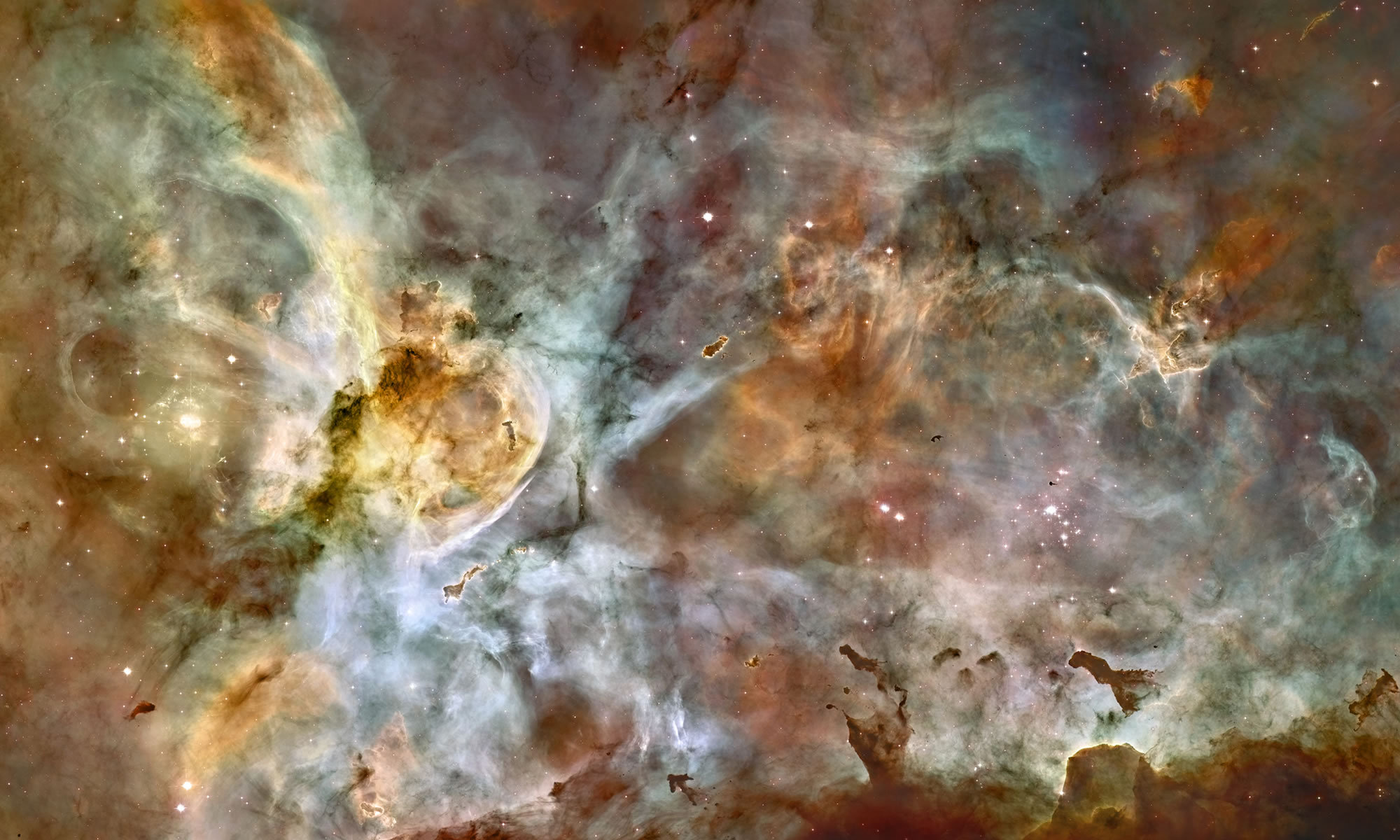
The film's Bifröst travel sequences (top) were inspired by Hubble photography (bottom).

In October 2010, casting calls revealed the film would be undergoing an undisclosed number of reshoots. In March 2011, scenes involving Adriana Barraza were removed from the theatrical cut of the film during the editing process. Branagh sent a letter of apology explaining the reasons for the cut and desire to work with Barraza again in the future. In response Barraza stated, "It saddens me because the movie is great and because I was acting alongside some tremendous actors that I admire very much, but I understand the nature of films, and it's not the first or last time that scenes will be cut". Barraza appears in only one scene in the film's theatrical cut. In that same month, Douglas Tait revealed that he performed for motion capture of the Frost Giants. On his hiring, Tait said "I am 6'5" and have a lean, athletic build, and they hired guys who were 6'7" and taller, and weighed over 250 pounds (110 kg). When the film was being edited, they wanted to make them even bigger and move faster. They auditioned people again and Kenneth Branagh chose me to perform the motion capture movements of the Frost Giants". In April 2011, the IMAX Corporation, Paramount Pictures and Marvel Entertainment announced that they have finalized an agreement to release the film in IMAX 3D, continuing the partnership which began on Iron Man 2. Branagh stated that the 3-D process initially made him cringe but said "We came to feel that in our case 3-D could be the very good friend of story and character for a different kind of experience". Although the film was shot in 2D, Feige stated that the "special effects for the film were conceived and executed from the beginning in 3D". The post-credits scene that sees Nick Fury approach Erik Selvig to ask him to study the Tesseract, was directed by The Avengers's director, Joss Whedon.

BUF Compagnie served as the lead visual effects vendor working on the film, with Digital Domain also providing work on the film. some of the software used for the visual effects were Autodesk Softimage. Branagh stated that BUF, who developed the effects for the race through space, were inspired by Hubble photography and other images of deep space. Branagh stated he sent paintings from classic studies by J. M. W. Turner to Digital Domain when creating Jotunheim. Peter Butterworth, VFX supervisor and co-founder of Fuel VFX, said the most challenging task was interpreting what the Bifröst would look like, "You can't Google what these things look like—they are totally imagined and within the heads of the stakeholders. So to extract that and interpret it for the big screen was an interesting challenge creatively. Technically, probably creating fluid simulations that could be art-directed and used for both the Bifröst and Odin's chamber shots. Part of the difficulty with solving these is that we had to ensure they would work in stereo. In the film, Odin enters what is known as the "Odinsleep" in his chamber to regenerate. Butterworth stated, "For Odin's Chamber, we developed a dome and curtain of light rays that hover over Odin's bed. This dome of light suggests harnessed power and energy that revitalizes him as he sleeps. We took a lot of reference from the natural world such as the corona of the sun and gave the sleep effect plenty of volume and space".

== Music ==
The film's score was written by composer Patrick Doyle, a frequent collaborator of Branagh. Doyle described Thor as "the most commercially high profile film I have done since Frankenstein", adding that the composing process had the challenge of trying to find a tone that fit the duality of Asgard and Earth. Thus Doyle and Branagh had frequent discussions on the musical direction, with the director suggesting a contemporary feel and having a balance between the music and "grand images [that] were not in any way hyperbolized", and the composer in turn implementing "a strong sense of melody, which he responds to in my work". As Doyle declared that his own Celtic background made him familiar with Norse mythology, an old Celtic folk song also provided the inspiration for Thor's leitmotif. A soundtrack album was released by Buena Vista Records in April 2011.

The film also features a song by the Foo Fighters, "Walk", in both a scene where a powerless Thor shares some boilermakers with Selvig in a roadhouse, and the film's closing credits. Marvel president Kevin Feige stated that "Walk" was a last minute addition, that the crew felt had "these eerie appropriate lyrics and themes" upon hearing it. Branagh in particular thought that "these lyrics about learning to walk again" were appropriate "of [a] movie about redemption, learning to be a hero."

== Marketing ==
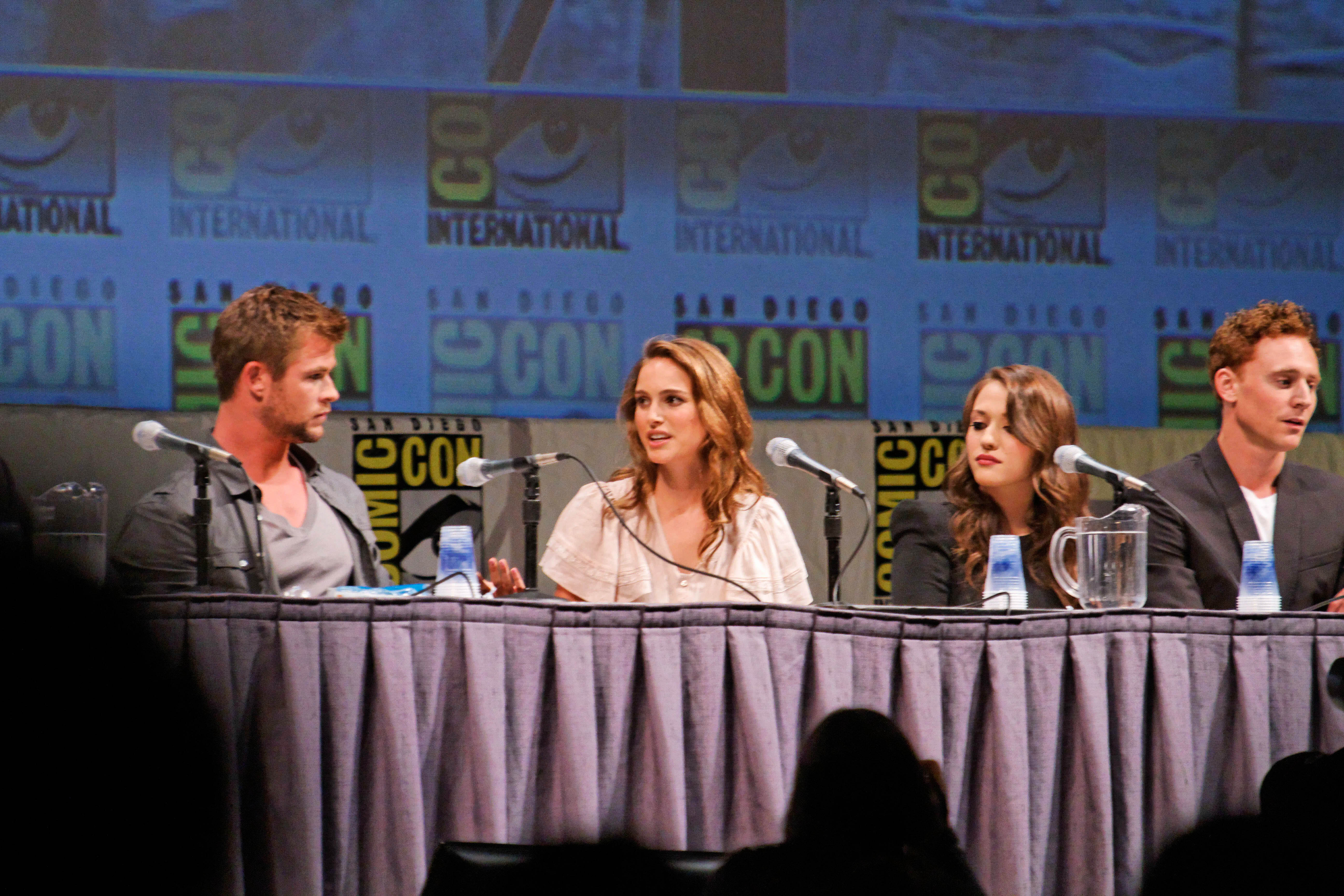
Hemsworth, Portman, Dennings and Hiddleston at the 2010 San Diego Comic-Con

In July 2010, Marvel Studios held a Thor panel at the 2010 San Diego Comic-Con during which Kenneth Branagh, Chris Hemsworth, Natalie Portman, Kat Dennings, Tom Hiddleston, and Clark Gregg discussed the film and showed some clips from it. A few days later, this footage was leaked on the internet. The first television advertisement was broadcast during Super Bowl XLV on the Fox network in the United States. The rate for advertising during the game was approximately $3 million per 30-second spot. Marvel Studios and Acura launched a joint viral marketing promotion at the 2011 Chicago Comic & Entertainment Expo. Other official promotional partners included Burger King, Dr Pepper, 7-Eleven, and Visa. In May 2011 Marvel Entertainment's president of print, animation and digital, Dan Buckley, and Marvel Comics editor-in-chief, Axel Alonso, rang the New York Stock Exchange closing bell in celebration of the theatrical release of Thor.

A post-credits scene in the film Iron Man 2 showed Coulson reporting the discovery of a large hammer in the desert. Rick Marshall of MTV News believed it to be the weapon Mjölnir belonging to Thor, writing, "It continues the grand tradition of connecting the film to another property in development around the Marvel movie universe." In the commentary track of Iron Man 2's home media, Iron Man 2's director, Jon Favreau, stated that "this is a scene from [the set of] Thor ".

Marvel Animation announced a 26-episode animated series in November 2008, to air in late 2010 before the release of Marvel Studios' film. The company released an animated direct-to-video film, Thor: Tales of Asgard, to coincide with the live-action film.

A video game titled Thor: God of Thunder based on the film was developed by Sega using the voices and likenesses of actors Chris Hemsworth, Tom Hiddleston and Jaimie Alexander, and was released on May 3, 2011.

== Release ==
=== Theatrical ===
Thor held its world premiere at the Event Cinemas theatre in George Street, Sydney on April 17, 2011, with the film opening on April 21, 2011, in Australia. The following weekend it opened in 56 markets, while the premiere at the El Capitan Theatre in Los Angeles, California took place on May 2, 2011. Thor opened on May 6, 2011, in the United States, in 3,955 theaters (of which 214 were IMAX 3D and 2,737 in 3D, a record amount). The film is part of Phase One of the MCU.

=== Home media ===
In July 2011, Marvel Studios and Paramount Pictures announced the release of Thor on Blu-ray 3D, Blu-ray Disc and DVD. The discs were released by Paramount Home Media Distribution on September 13, 2011, in three editions: a single-disc DVD, a 2-disc Blu-ray-DVD combo pack, and a 3-disc Blu-ray/DVD/3D combo pack. All sets come with deleted scenes and a "Road to The Avengers" featurette. The 2-disc and 3-disc packs includes a digital copy, the first in a series of Marvel One-Shots, The Consultant, and 7 behind-the-scenes featurettes.

Branagh said that the DVD includes at least 20 minutes of deleted scenes. Branagh stated the footage contains "things like the Asgardian parents, Odin and Frigga, played by the beautiful Rene Russo, there's some beautiful scenes in there that I think people will enjoy. And certainly Thor and Loki interacting in different ways that just fill in a little bit of a back story, that was part of our rehearsal and research." In its first week of release, Thor took the number one spot on Blu-ray/DVD sales chart and topped Home Media Magazine's rental chart for the week.

The film was also collected in a 10-disc box set titled "Marvel Cinematic Universe: Phase One – Avengers Assembled" which includes all of the Phase One films in the Marvel Cinematic Universe. It was released by Walt Disney Studios Home Entertainment on April 2, 2013.

== Reception ==
=== Box office ===
Thor grossed $181 million in the United States and Canada, and $268.3 million in other territories, for a worldwide total of $449.3 million. It was the 15th highest-grossing film of 2011.

Thor earned $25.5 million on its opening day in the United States and Canada, including $3.3 million from Thursday previews, for a total weekend gross of $65.7 million. $6.2 million of the gross came from IMAX 3D, while 60% of the gross was from 3D screenings. It became the tenth highest-grossing film of 2011 in the United States and Canada, and the highest-grossing comic-book film from May–August 2011.

Thor's opening in Australia generated $5.8 million and placing second behind Universal Pictures' Fast Five. The film's box office was just 1% more than Iron Man opening in Australia in 2008, Marvel's most popular release at the time. The following week, Thor opened in 56 markets and took in $89.2 million through the weekend. The film's highest grossing markets were the United Kingdom ($22.5 million), Australia ($20.1 million) and Mexico ($19.5 million).

=== Critical response ===
The review aggregator Rotten Tomatoes reported an approval rating of 77%, with an average score of 6.7/10, based on 292 reviews. The website's consensus reads, "A dazzling blockbuster that tempers its sweeping scope with wit, humor, and human drama, Thor is mighty Marvel entertainment." Metacritic assigned a weighted average score of 57 out of 100, based on 40 critics, indicating "mixed or average" reviews. Audiences polled by CinemaScore gave the film an average grade of "B+" on an A+ to F scale.

Richard Kuipers of Variety stated, "Thor delivers the goods so long as butt is being kicked and family conflict is playing out in celestial dimensions, but is less thrilling during the Norse warrior god's rather brief banishment on Earth". Megan Lehmann of The Hollywood Reporter wrote, "The hammer-hurling god of thunder kicks off this superhero summer with a bang". In the Chicago Sun-Times, Richard Roeper liked the film "Thanks in large part to a charming, funny and winning performance from Australian actor Chris Hemsworth in the title role, Thor is the most entertaining superhero debut since the original Spider-Man".

Roger Ebert of the Chicago Sun-Times gave it a negative review stating, "Thor is a failure as a movie, but a success as marketing, an illustration of the ancient carnival tactic of telling the rubes anything to get them into the tent". A.O. Scott of The New York Times disliked the film, calling it "an example of the programmed triumph of commercial calculation over imagination". Kenneth Turan of the Los Angeles Times had mixed feelings, describing the film as "an aesthetic stand-off between predictable elements and unexpected ones". Turan praised the performances of Hemsworth, Hopkins, and Elba, but found the special effects inconsistent and the Earth storyline derivative.

=== Accolades ===
Year	Award	Category	Nominee	Result	Ref.
2011	Teen Choice Awards	Choice Movie Breakout: Male	Chris Hemsworth	Nominated	
2011	Scream Awards	The Ultimate Scream	Thor	Nominated	
2011	Scream Awards	Best Fantasy Movie	Thor	Nominated	
2011	Scream Awards	Best Superhero	Chris Hemsworth as Thor	Nominated	
2011	Scream Awards	Best Supporting Actress	Jaimie Alexander	Nominated	
2011	Scream Awards	Breakout Performance—Female	Jaimie Alexander	Nominated	
2011	Scream Awards	Breakout Performance—Male	Chris Hemsworth	Nominated	
2011	Scream Awards	Breakout Performance—Male	Tom Hiddleston	Nominated	
2011	Scream Awards	Best F/X	Thor	Nominated	
2011	Scream Awards	Best Comic Book Movie	Thor	Nominated	
2012	People's Choice Awards	Favorite Action Movie	Thor	Nominated	
2012	People's Choice Awards	Favorite Movie Superhero	Chris Hemsworth	Nominated	
2012	Visual Effects Society Awards	Outstanding Created Environment in a Live Action Feature Motion Picture	"Heimdall's Observatory": Pierre Buffin, Audrey Ferrara, Yoel Godo, Dominique Vidal	Nominated	
2012	Visual Effects Society Awards	Outstanding Virtual Cinematography in a Live Action Feature Motion Picture	Xavier Allard, Pierre Buffin, Nicolas Chevallier	Nominated	
2012	Empire Awards	Best Male Newcomer	Tom Hiddleston	Won	
2012	Empire Awards	Best Sci-Fi/Fantasy	Thor	Won	
2012	Empire Awards	The Art of 3D Presented by RealD	Thor	Nominated	
2012	MTV Movie Awards	Best Hero	Chris Hemsworth as Thor	Nominated	
2012	Saturn Awards	Best Fantasy Film	Thor	Nominated	
2012	Saturn Awards	Best Supporting Actor	Tom Hiddleston	Nominated	
2012	Saturn Awards	Best Production Design	Bo Welch	Nominated	
2012	Saturn Awards	Best Costume	Alexandra Byrne	Won	

== Sequels ==
=== Thor: The Dark World ===
A sequel, Thor: The Dark World, directed by Alan Taylor, was released on November 8, 2013. Hemsworth, Hiddleston, and Portman reprised their roles, along with others from the first film. Zachary Levi replaced Dallas as Fandral, while Christopher Eccleston joined the cast as the Dark Elf Malekith.

=== Thor: Ragnarok ===
Thor: Ragnarok was released on November 3, 2017, directed by Taika Waititi. Eric Pearson and Craig Kyle & Christopher Yost wrote the screenplay, with Kevin Feige again producing. Hemsworth, Hiddleston, Hopkins, Elba, Asano, Levi, and Stevenson reprised their roles as Thor, Loki, Odin, Heimdall, Hogun, Fandral, and Volstagg, respectively, while Mark Ruffalo and Benedict Cumberbatch appeared as Bruce Banner / Hulk and Stephen Strange respectively, reprising their roles from previous MCU films. Cate Blanchett, Tessa Thompson, Jeff Goldblum and Karl Urban joined the cast as Hela, Valkyrie, Grandmaster, and Skurge, respectively.

=== Thor: Love and Thunder ===
A fourth film titled Thor: Love and Thunder was released on July 8, 2022. Hemsworth, Thompson, and Elba reprised their roles, with Portman, Alexander, Dennings, and Skarsgård returning after not appearing in Ragnarok. Portman portrayed her character taking on the mantle of Thor, similar to the comics. Additionally, Chris Pratt, Pom Klementieff, Dave Bautista, Karen Gillan, Vin Diesel, Bradley Cooper, and Sean Gunn reprise their roles as Guardians of the Galaxy members Peter Quill / Star-Lord, Mantis, Drax the Destroyer, Nebula, Groot, Rocket, and Kraglin Obfonteri. Christian Bale joined the cast as the villain Gorr the God Butcher.

== See also ==
- "What If... the World Lost Its Mightiest Heroes?" and "What If... Thor Were an Only Child?", episodes of the MCU television series What If...? that reimagine events of this film
