= Daniel Wolek =

- One Life to Live character
- Michael Palance as Daniel Wolek "Dr. Dan"
- Portrayed by: Neail Holland (1974–1976); Eddie Moran (1976–1979); Timothy Waldrip (1983, 1985); Steven Culp (1983–1984); Ted Demers (1984); Josh Coxx (1986–1987); Michael Palance (1989–1991)
- Duration: 1971–1979; 1983–1987; 1989–1991
- First appearance: November 17, 1971
- Last appearance: January 16, 1991
- Created by: Agnes Nixon
- Introduced by: Doris Quinlan; Henry Slesar (1983); Paul Rauch (1989)
- Josh Coxx as Daniel Wolek
In-universe information
- Occupation: Physician; Journalist
- Family: Wolek; Lord
- Father: Larry Wolek
- Mother: Meredith Lord
- Siblings: Stillborn twin sister
- Grandparents: Victor Lord; Eugenia Lord
- Aunts and uncles: Anna Wolek; Vince Wolek; Tony Lord; Victoria Lord; Tina Lord; Todd Manning; Victor Lord, Jr.
- First cousins: Megan Gordon; Brian Kendall; Kevin Buchanan; Joey Buchanan; Jessica Buchanan; Natalie Buchanan; C. J. Roberts; Sarah Roberts; Starr Manning; Danielle Manning; Jack Manning; Sam Manning; Cathy Craig (adoptive)

Daniel Wolek is a fictional character on the American soap opera One Life to Live. He is the only son of original characters Larry Wolek and Meredith Lord.

== Background and storyline ==
Daniel, nicknamed "Dr. Dan" or "Dan" was born onscreen November 17, 1971. He is the first grandchild of series patriarch Victor Lord (Ernest Graves) to appear on the serial, and Victor's third-born grandchild in the show's final canon after Megan Gordon and Brian Kendall. His twin sister is born stillborn, which prompts mother Meredith (Lynn Benesch) to suffer post-partum depression and seek help from Dr. Joyce Brothers (playing herself).

In 1973, Daniel's mother dies of a traumatic brain injury following a freak accident during an attempted robbery at the Lord estate Llanfair. Larry raises young Danny a single father and with help from his siblings Anna and Vince. Danny leaves fictional Llanview in 1979 attends to boarding school overseas.

Danny is aged to an adult in 1983 and becomes a newspaper reporter for his grandfather's newspaper, The Banner. Dorian Lord Callison (Robin Strasser) seduces Dan into a brief love affair in 1984. The character returns to Llanview on an ongoing basis in August 1986 as Dr. Dan Wolek (Josh Coxx), a resident physician at Llanview Hospital. He dates shy Allison Perkins (Barbara Garrick) briefly before she falls under the spell of Mitch Laurence (Roscoe Born). Dan (Michael Palance) returns again in 1989 and soon becomes a rival to his own father Doctor Larry Wolek for the affection of nurse Brenda McGillis (Brenda Brock) in a love triangle. The nefarious Michael Grande (Dennis Parlato) then seeks to woo Brenda, and rigs a medical malpractice case to get Dan fired from Llanview Hospital. Michael is killed in a whodunit, and Dan is accused of murdering Michael before the former husband of his aunt Victoria Lord Buchanan (Erika Slezak), Roger Gordon (Larry Pine), is revealed to be Michael's actual killer.

Dr. Wolek is fired from Llanview Hospital, and starts a private clinic for low-income Llanview residents. He falls in love with Laura Jean Ellis (Neith Hunter), the estranged wife of one of the mob lieutenants of Carlo Hesser (Thom Christopher). Dan leaves Llanview with Laura and with little fanfare in 1991.

== Casting and impact ==
In spite of being related to original and long-running protagonists Larry Wolek and Victoria Lord, the role of Daniel Wolek failed to achieve the fanfare the showrunners had hoped for. Daniel was recast six times between 1974 and 1991 and is the second-most recast character role on One Life to Live after Kevin Buchanan.

The role was originated by infant children in non-speaking roles from 1971 until 1974. Daniel began appearing as a speaking role in 1974, played child actors Neail Holland from 1974 through 1976 and Eddie Moran from 1976 until 1979. The role was aged up to a 17-year-old with actor Timothy Waldrip in the role in 1983, changing the character's onscreen birth year from 1971 to 1966. Actor Steven Culp replaced Waldrip in the role from 1983 until 1984. Actor Ted Demers played the character in 1984. Waldrip returned to play the role after he was fired in 1983 for a few months in 1985. Josh Coxx picked up playing the character from 1986 until he was fired in 1987. Michael Palance was the last actor to play Daniel Wolek, from March 9, 1989 until he left the show on January 16, 1991.

In 2021, Wally Kurth revealed he had auditioned for the role "a few years" prior to his casting as Justin Kiriakis on Days of Our Lives.
