= Tammy Ader =

American screenwriter

- Born: Tamara J. Ader; New York City, U.S.
- Other name: Tammy Ader-Green
- Education: B.A. Brandeis University (1984)
- Occupations: Television screenwriter, director & producer
- Years active: 1988–present
- Known for: Strong Medicine
- Awards: * Winner, Gracie Allen Aeard for Outstanding Producing/Best Dramatic Series, for Strong Medicine (2003) * Winner, SHINE Award for Best Drama (for Strong Medicine, 2003)

Tammy Ader-Green is an American television writer, director, and producer. She is best known as the creator and executive producer, with Whoopi Goldberg, of the television show Strong Medicine on the Lifetime network. Her other production credits include Dawson's Creek and The Wonder Years. Green received a Gracie Allen Award from the Foundation of American Women in Radio and Television (now the Alliance for Women in Media) for Outstanding Producing and Best Dramatic Series (for Strong Medicine) and the SHINE Award for Best Drama (for Strong Medicine) in 2003.

Green began her writing career as a student at Rush Medical College after attending Brandeis University as an undergraduate. After leaving medical school to pursue writing full-time, she spent most of her career living and working in the Los Angeles, California area. Green is married to Dr. Gary Green, an emergency medicine physician, and lives in Baltimore, Maryland with their son Emmet. Gary Green has been vice chair of emergency medicine at New York University School of Medicine and an associate professor of emergency medicine and pathology at the Johns Hopkins University.

== Production credits ==
- Strong Medicine
- Dawson's Creek
- Sisters
- W.I.O.U.
- The Wonder Years
- Quantum Leap
- thirtysomething (hired by Edward Zwick and Marshall Herskovitz)
- Party of Five
- The Young and the Restless
- Outlaw Force
