= One Life to Live storylines (1980–1989) =

Storylines of American soap opera

One Life to Live (often abbreviated as OLTL) is an American soap opera created by Agnes Nixon. During the 1980s, the show was broadcast on the ABC television network and episodes were an hour long.

== 1980–1983 ==
The early 1980s were a time of big changes for One Life to Live. The Wolek sisters were the spotlight characters of the show as the new decade began. The primary storyline on the show in 1979 concentrated on Viki's trial for the murder of Marco Dane (Gerald Anthony). Anthony was so popular with fans that he quickly returned (a quick rewrite revealed Marco's heretofore unknown twin brother Mario was killed instead; Marco impersonated him for several years). Karen discovers Marco's secret but realizes he was genuinely trying to rehabilitate, so she didn't expose him. Meanwhile, Jenny was treated badly by her husband Brad who then manipulated her into taking him back over and over again. Brad also raped Karen. Jenny was in a high-risk pregnancy at the time, and the news of the rape sent her into early labor. When the baby died in the nursery, Karen forced Marco to switch the child with fellow hooker Katrina Karr's child. Jenny finally left Brad for good and married Dr. Peter Janssen, who was later killed in a car accident. It would be several years before she found out the truth about 'her' baby and in a heartbreaking sequence, gave her daughter back to Katrina.

Joe Riley succumbed to a brain tumor and died in the fall of 1979, only weeks before Viki delivered their second son (whom she named Joseph in his memory). Viki buried herself in work as a publisher of the Banner, and in looking after Tina, who was perpetually involved with one bad-news boyfriend after another. Although she deliberately avoided a new relationship, she attracted two prospective love interests. One was Ted Clayton, Tina's father (actually stepfather, though she didn't know it at the time) who was more interested in Viki's wealth than her. The other was Clint Buchanan (Clint Ritchie), who took over Joe's position as chief editor of the Llanview Banner. Viki and Clint clashed both professionally and personally – Clint was a no-nonsense cowboy who initially saw Viki as a pampered Primadonna. Eventually, though true love won out and, despite numerous schemes by Ted, Viki and Clint were married. Ted was finally gunned down, prompting a devastated Tina to leave Llanview for a while.

Quickly following Clint to Llanview were his brother Bo Buchanan (Robert S. Woods), and Father Asa Buchanan (Phil Carey). Asa is a Texas oil baron millionaire who has a love-hate relationship with his sons, and practically everyone he knew. The Buchanan clan was an obvious attempt to imitate the then wildly popular prime-time soap Dallas, but the Buchanans proved to be such big hits that they soon dominated the entire show. Most of the Wolek and Lord family members who anchored OLTL since its inception were written out, or (in the case of Viki) married into the Buchanan family. (Ironically the Buchanan family has remained a popular fixture on the daytime soap to this day, outlasting their inspirations on Dallas by more than a decade.) Asa was as much a scoundrel as J.R. Ewing in his business dealings but he was also an irrepressible ladies' man. Almost immediately after arriving in Llanview, Asa wooed Brad Vernon's sister Samantha, who was decades younger than he was. What no one knew was that Asa's first wife Olympia (mother of Clint and Bo) was still alive, still legally Asa's wife, and being held prisoner by him. Throughout the 1980s, Asa took one young bride after another — including Delilah Ralston, Becky Lee Abbott, Pamela Stuart and Gabrielle Medina. He also locked horns with his sons, particularly Bo, who had his own romantic interest in both Delilah and Becky Lee.

The role of Dorian was recast with Robin Strasser, who arguably became the definitive portrait of the character. While continuing to be a thorn in Viki's side (she briefly romanced Clint when he and Viki were on the outs), her character was fleshed out a little more. She married Herb Callison, the district attorney who prosecuted Viki for murder. Although she expected to be able to control him, Herb proved to be more than a match for her, and their marriage was a tempestuous affair, although surprisingly long-lasting for two soap opera characters. Another complication in Dorian's life was the abrupt arrival of Cassie Howard, the illegitimate daughter whom Dorian had given up years earlier. Dorian at first resists becoming a mother to Cassie but eventually accepts the girl into her home.

Karen's "housewife hooker" storyline was rehashed in 1981 by having Karen go undercover, posing as a prostitute while investigating the murder of her cousin Vinnie Wolek. Karen and Marco are framed for murder and have to go on the run from the mob. The reality-based tales took a turn towards the absurd in the early 1980s, as Karen and Larry have control chips implanted in their brains by Dr. Ivan Kipling (Jack Betts) and Larry has to save Karen from Kipling's jungle hideaway.

== 1983–1986 ==
In 1983 Karen falls in love with fugitive Steve Piermont (Robert Desiderio, Light's real-life husband.) In spite of Larry urging her to remain in Llanview, she decided she would rather go on the run with a man who needed her than stay with her old demons.

Karen's sister Jenny fell in love with David Renaldi (Michael Zaslow), a concert pianist, who had fathered Dorian's daughter Cassie. Although married to Herb, Dorian was at turns furiously bitter towards, and jealously possessive of David. She sought to drive a wedge between David and Jenny, going as far as seducing him. Her schemes ultimately backfired; not only was she unsuccessful at breaking up David and Jenny, but Herb also found out about her fling and divorced her. David and Jenny were then embroiled in a spy storyline in 1985, taking them to Vienna, Austria with Viki & Clint. Jenny and David remained in Vienna.

Thanksgiving 1983, Asa held a lavish costume ball in honor of his young wife, Samantha. During the festivities, Olympia escaped captivity and revealed to Bo that she was still alive, and that Asa wasn't really his father (the last bit turned out not to be true.) Olympia tried coaxing Bo into shooting Asa, but he couldn't pull the trigger. When Olympia herself tried to kill her husband, Samantha lunged to save Asa and knocked Olympia and herself out a window. Only Samantha survived the fall. When she was informed that Asa was a liar and a bigamist, she dumped him then and there. Perhaps the most spectacular part of this storyline was its length. While it was all supposed to occur in the space of one night, it took up an entire month's worth of episodes, with five, hour-long episodes being aired for four whole weeks. These episodes took up approximately 20 hours of airtime and were all dedicated to the events of one single evening.

Asa and Bo promptly went on fighting — mainly over women. Bo fell in love with Delila Ralston, but Asa deliberately led them both to believe that they were half-siblings (Bo had been told by Olympia that his real father had been Yancey Ralston — Delila's father). Asa let them know that they weren't actually related only after he married Delila. Soon afterward, Asa faked his death to test Delila's fidelity — she wasted no time marrying Bo! Later, aspiring country-western singer Becky Lee Abbott became pregnant with Bo's son Drew but married Asa instead. Later still, Bo fell in love with and married Didi O'Neill, whose father Harry O'Neill (Frank Converse) was a blue-collar working man fighting Asa's plans to gentrify east Llanview. In 1986, it was revealed that throughout all the convoluted events of the past several years, Asa had been bigamously married to another woman, Pamela Stuart. Pamela was never involved with Bo in any way.

In 1985, Viki returned to the spotlight in one of the show's landmark storylines – the return of Niki Smith. Tina returned to Llanview and uncovered proof that she was Victor Lord's illegitimate daughter. Viki angrily refused to believe Tina's claims, until the discovery of a secret room in Llanfair (the Lord family mansion) that Victor had used as an illicit sex den. Shocked to discover this side of her father's persona, Viki began having 'Niki Smith' episodes once again. Tina hooked up with sleazy con man Mitch Laurence (Roscoe Born), who concocted a plan to turn Viki into Niki permanently, which (thanks to a clause in Victor Lord's will) would leave Tina in control of the vast Lord fortune. But when Tina discovered Mitch wanted to kill Niki, she turned against him. Niki remained in control for months, causing misery for Clint. Tina rebounded from her uncharacteristic bout of selflessness in order to seduce Clint. Niki was able to imitate Viki's mannerisms well enough to fool people into thinking she was really Viki. She then used Clint's transgression with Tina as grounds to divorce him. Clint was eventually able to shock Viki back to her senses. With Niki banished once more, Viki happily remarried Clint. On their wedding day, she broke the news to him that she was pregnant with his child. Almost nine months later, Viki delivered her daughter Jessica.

The wildly popular Niki Smith storyline re-energized OLTL. It was during the Paul Rauch era when One Life to Live would maintain consistently high ratings, placing it in the top three daytime soap operas from 1985 into the late 1980s.

OLTL also found success with the popular supercouple pairing of Tina and good-hearted cowboy Cordero 'Cord' Roberts (John Loprieno). The two in love from the moment they met, but Tina was intent on marrying a rich husband. When she discovered that Cord was the illegitimate son of Clint (and potential heir to Buchanan mega-millions), she wasted no time marrying him! Cord however would soon become disgusted by Tina's conniving ways. Complicating matters was Cord's mother Maria Roberts (Barbara Luna), who despised Tina and sought to undermine her at every turn. Maria was also still in love with Clint and wanted to break up Clint and Viki in order to win him back. Maria even went as far as tracking down the late Joe's heretofore unknown long-lost twin brother Tom Dennison (like Joe, played by Lee Patterson) and bringing him to Llanview in hopes that Viki would leave Clint for him.

Mitch Laurence also returned to town to menace both Tina and Viki. In the guise of a fundamentalist minister, Mitch began leading a religious cult composed mainly of young women he seduced. He tried to rape Cassie but was (presumably) killed in self-defense by Dorian. Dorian was wrongly found guilty of premeditated murder and sent to prison. But evidence would lead to her conviction being overturned, releasing Dorian from jail. She would continue her TV journalism career at WVLE while finding romance with a private investigator, Jon Russell.

With Cassie visiting her father, David in Vienna, Dorian also found a young protege in Diane Bristol. But Diane had a dark side and was secretly involved with Jon's sociopath nephew, Jamie Sanders' criminal activity. Cassie returned to Llanview and became suspicious of Diane's focus on Dorian. Jon shared Cassie's concern and the two paired up to uncover Diane's motives. Cassie soon found herself alongside Dorian in a dangerous confrontation with an unhinged and gun-toting Diane. Dorian saved Cassie by intercepting Diane, causing her to fall to her death through her penthouse's plate glass window. Soon Dorian noticed that Cassie had grown close with Jon during the ordeal. After confronting both of them, Cassie admitted to having feelings for him, leading Dorian to break up with Jon and to her falling out with her daughter. Dorian was soon offered the opportunity to become U.S. Ambassador to the country of Mendora. After mending her rift with Cassie, Dorian would leave Llanview to begin work in her new role.

== 1987–1989 ==
In the late 1980s, usually, either Viki and Clint or Tina and Cord were at the center of the major storylines. Viki and Clint were the show's exemplary married couple; their love was strong enough to weather any crisis (no matter how bizarre.) Tina and Cord on the other hand broke up and reconciled (including marrying and divorcing) at a head-spinning rate. Tina genuinely tried to change her selfish ways to please Cord, but her greedy nature always got the better of her and she would alienate Cord's affections time and again. Also, at this time storylines became extremely campy but were told in a way that viewers could understand, and they seemed to enjoy the change that was made as they became more and more bizarre from the Maria Roberts Saga to Viki going to Heaven, Eterna and the Crown Jewels to Mendora.

Following the 'Niki Smith' saga, Allison Perkins (one of the 'late' Mitch Laurence's cult disciples) kidnapped Viki's baby Jessica for a while. This was a plot point that would have major ramifications in later years. Then in 1987, Viki underwent a brain operation to remove an aneurysm. During the operation, Viki had an out-of-body experience in which she visited Heaven and was reunited with many deceased characters, such as Victor, Meredith, Eugenia, Tony, Irene, Samantha, Harry and Vinnie. Many past cast members came back, and Lee Patterson (who was appearing as the new character Tom Dennison) even resurrected his original character, Joe Riley. Viki returned to her body and woke up, and it remained unclear whether Viki had actually been to Heaven or simply dreamed it. (Though later storyline developments have made it clear that Viki was only dreaming.)

A new major family, the wealthy and powerful Sanders clan, was created with three power-house soap veterans playing the older members of the family: Emmy nominated Lois Kibbee (The Edge of Night) as powerful matriarch Elizabeth Sanders), Peter Brown (Days of Our Lives, The Young and the Restless, Loving) as her handsome son, Charles Sanders, ambassador to a fictional country named Mendora, and Louise Sorel (Santa Barbara, later Days of Our Lives) as his wife, Judith Sanders, the D.A. who prosecuted Dorian for Mitch Lawrence's murder. A controversial element of their storyline had acerbic Elizabeth openly anti-Semitic towards Judith even though she was quite powerful in her own right. While the family was given some entertaining storylines (very similar to the Quartermains from General Hospital), both Brown and Sorel became restless and left after only a year. Kibbee would remain on for another two years, only taken off of contract after Elizabeth was revealed to be the mastermind behind a plot to bring down the Buchannan family as part of revenge against both Asa and Cord. She would return infrequently over the next year until a summer storyline in 1989 had her in cahoots with grandson Jaime to escape from prison, ultimately resulting in Cord and Tina being held captive by them.

=== OLTL does time travel ===
The following year, 1988, Clint was blinded by a gunshot wound to the head. After a riding accident in the Arizona desert, he regained his sight but found himself transported back in time to 1888, and the old west town "Buchanan City". While there, Clint met the lookalike ancestors of Asa, Cord and Viki (played by Carey, Loprieno and Slezak respectively.) Like "Heaven", this storyline was intended to have a vague ending – after its resolution, Clint would reappear in the present and not be able to determine if he was actually there or had an extended hallucination. Before the storyline was finished though, the Writers Guild of America went on strike. Several scab writers rewrote the storyline so that Viki also went back in time to rescue Clint (who was on the verge of marrying her ancestor Ginny Fletcher at the time). Thus, the time-travel story was definitely established as a "real" event in the history of OLTL.

As for Tina and Cord: Cord took an interest in scientist Kate Sanders (Marcia Cross), so Tina fled to Argentina with bad boy Max Holden (James DePaiva), even though she was pregnant by Cord at the time. After running afoul of drug dealers, Tina went over the Iguazu Falls in a raft and was presumed dead. (Actress Andrea Evans had it written into her contract that she gets eight weeks off per year.) Meanwhile, Tina was alive and well and being kept alive in the jungle. Cord rebounded by proposing to Kate, but Tina crashed the wedding ceremony carrying a baby she claimed was Cord's son though it was not. Baby "Al" had actually been Max's son by Gabrielle Medina (Fiona Hutchison). Tina then got into a scuffle with Cord's mother Maria and accidentally killed her. Because she tried to cover up her accidental involvement, Tina was wrongfully found guilty of deliberately murdering her, and sent to jail for several months. After getting out of jail, Tina learned she had not miscarried Cord's son after her plunge over the falls, but that a ring of baby-sellers had stolen the child. Tina and Max tracked down the baby, and Max had to storm a castle rampart to rescue both Tina and the baby (named Clint Jr. or C.J. Roberts in honor of Clint, who was thought dead at the time.) Tina almost married Max, but while saying her vows, she said Cord's name by accident. This caused Max to abruptly leave her at the altar.

Max and Gabrielle became popular characters in their own right and were spun off into their own storyline. Another popular new character at the time was Renee Divine (played mainly by Patricia Elliott) as the new love of Asa's life. For years, Asa had typically favored trophy wives, much younger women whom he could control (or attempt to control). However, Renee was his peer, and a former Texas madam. She was worldly and strong-willed enough to stand up to Asa, whom she often called an "old coot".

=== Patrick London impersonates Bo Buchanan ===
Bo returned to Llanview (actor Robert S. Woods had left the series for two years) and took center-stage for a while in 1988. When he came back to town, he was mysteriously divorced from his wife Didi, and acted quite strangely. Several months after his return, it was revealed that this was not the real Bo but an impostor (nicknamed Faux Bo) who was part of Elizabeth Sanders' elaborate scheme to stage a hostile takeover of Buchanan Industries. The real Bo, his wife Didi, and even his ex-wife Delila, were being held prisoner in a bunker. The real Bo, who escaped imprisonment and had a showdown with his impostor, thwarted the hostile takeover scheme. Alas, Didi was killed, but Bo eventually found happiness again with Sarah Gordon (Jensen Buchanan), who had been Clint's therapist during the time he was blind.

=== Soap within a soap Fraternity Row ===
OLTL engaged in some meta-humor in 1988 when several characters became involved with the production of a fictional soap opera called Fraternity Row. The backstage antics at the soap became a central storyline for OLTL for several years. The star of the soap was Sarah's sister Megan Gordon (Jessica Tuck), a petty diva. Megan got involved with Max, who took her down a peg or two. But Megan would have a major impact in the life of central heroine Viki. Much to her surprise, Viki learned that she had become Niki Smith while still a teenager (much earlier than anyone knew) and that her father Victor had a hypnotist erase her memory of the incident. Even more shocking was the revelation that Viki/Niki had given birth to a daughter. (Adding insult to injury, Viki's longtime best friend Larry Wolek had delivered the baby and helped Victor cover the incident up.) Eventually, Viki would learn that the baby she had given birth to was Megan. But there were plenty of bizarre twists and turns to unravel before mother and daughter were reunited...

=== The Lost Underground City of Eterna ===
OLTL took a turn towards science fiction in early 1989 as, through Michael Grande's machinations, Viki and several others (including Tina, Cord, Gabrielle and several others) were trapped in the underground city of Eterna. Alone with Viki in the underground city, Roger Gordon finally confessed his long-buried secret: He was raised in Eterna but had found a way to escape. He met Viki when she was in high school. They had sex. One day, Viki watched in horror as the entrance to Eterna exploded. Believing that Roger was dead, she turned into Niki Smith. Viki/Niki gave birth to his daughter, Megan. She had carried the baby as Niki, then later turned back to Viki during childbirth, but Victor had her hypnotized to forget the birth. He then paid Roger to take the baby and leave town. Viki was amazed to learn that Megan, who had been her adversary, was actually her flesh and blood. While in Eterna, Viki and Roger's old feelings for each other began to resurface. Led by Clint, the authorities located and rescued everyone trapped inside just before Eterna collapsed.

Viki enjoyed an uneasy "reunion" with her reluctant daughter, Megan. In time, Viki and Megan mended their fences and came to respect, admire and love each other. Megan became the center of attention on OLTL and had several comical adventures with Marco Dane (who returned to the show after a five-year absence).

=== Austin terrorizes Llanview ===
Austin Buchanan, son of Asa's brother, Pike, arrived in town and became obsessed with Sarah Gordon. He set out to steal her from Bo. Austin knew that Bo and Michael Grande were mortal enemies, so he rigged the brakes on Michael's car to fail. The accident killed Alicia and her baby, and injured Gabrielle instead! Audrey Ames (Pia Porter), also on the road that night, was hit by the car driven by Gabrielle, putting her in a wheelchair. Austin framed Bo for the car crash that killed Alicia, and her baby and injured Gabrielle and Audrey. Austin eventually confessed to the crime but wanted Sarah to have sex with him. She tried to put him off, but he became angry and brutally raped her. After the rape, Sarah shot Austin. To protect her, Cord and Asa buried Austin's body. However, the evil Buchanan cousin was not dead after all! He crawled out of his shallow grave and sought revenge on Sarah. Austin's reign of terror quickly came to an end. After taking Viki and Megan hostage, Clint found them and shot Austin. Felled by Clint's bullet, Austin plunged out a high-rise window to his death, but not before shooting Viki.

As the decade drew to a close, OLTL featured a rehash of the classic Karen/Jenny baby-switch storyline. This time, Gabrielle (aided by Austin) switched Michael's and the late Alicia's baby (who died shortly after being born) with that of Brenda Grande's baby. At the same time, Megan went into a fugue state in which she believed she was her Fraternity Row character Ruby Bright, a riff on her mother Viki's Niki Smith escapades. Both stories, however, were well received by critics and fans.

=== The Fraternity Row Stalker ===
Another infamous story saw the soap, Fraternity Row being stalked from January to March 1989 as numerous past death scenes were recreated and used to kill the cast and crew as producer Randy was killed by a falling chandelier, Bo was attacked, Audrey was nearly strangled, Bo saved Sarah from a bomb, an explosion destroyed the lab and many other death plots. Bo soon discovered that anyone who seemed to put Mari-Lynn Dennison down died! Jon Russell, Melinda Cramer, Mari-Lynn, Sarah Gordon and Bo himself all teamed up to catch the killer. Prime suspects were Casey an autistic stagehand and Neil, another stagehand with a deep love for Mari-Lynn. The killer then tried to kill off Sarah again by pushing a stone gargoyle from a church rooftop where they were filming location scenes. Bo rescued her and while filming location scenes at Duke University, Sarah realized Neil was indeed the killer, so Neil stopped Sarah from escaping and chloroformed her as she cried out for Bo. He then dragged her to the university clock tower where he held Sarah captive. Mari-Lynn, Wade and Bo located Neil and Sarah and burst into the tower to rescue Sarah. Neil had an axe to defend himself with and pushed Wade over a railing as Mari-Lynn hovered over Neil in tears. Bo fell down a flight of stairs as Neil headed over to kill Sarah, Wade and Bo until Bo battled Neil one last time before the cops arrived.

=== The Infamous Crown Jewels of Mendora ===
Tina Lord Roberts set out to pursue the lost Crown Jewels of Mendora for Michael Grande throughout the summer despite her family's dismay. But what she did not know was that many of her past enemies were also after the jewels among them being Jamie and Elizabeth Sanders and Ursula Blackwell. To escape prison, Ursula set off a bomb that allowed numerous convicts to escape and they fled to the rundown Seaside Arena in Atlantic City where Tina and Cord were captured and held prisoner. They were forced into doing many wacky things including Cord wrestling the Titan in a wrestling ring and Tina and Ursula wrestling! Then Tina was put on a "murder trial" in the ring for killing Ursula's father Cornelius who fell out of a lighthouse window trying to save Tina in 1988. After the trial in which Tina escaped death row, Jamie and Elizabeth planned to flee the Arena on a helicopter and Leave Tina and Cord to die when the arena blew up. But Titan and Ursula dragged Tina and Cord away from their cells and strapped Tina to Ursula's homemade electric chair where Ursula fried Tina. However, the cops invade the Arena, and the convicts are captured, and Cord is reunited with an alive and well Tina.

== Ratings ==
=== 1979-1980 Season (HH Ratings) ===
1. General Hospital 9.9
2. All My Children 9.2
3. The Young and the Restless 8.8
4. One Life to Live 8.7
5. Guiding Light 8.3
6. As the World Turns 7.9
7. Search for Tomorrow 7.6
8. Another World 7.1
9. Ryan's Hope 7.0
10. Days of Our Lives 6.6
11. The Doctors 6.1
12. The Edge of Night 5.3
13. Love of Life 3.5
14. Texas (Debut)

=== 1981-1982 Season (HH Ratings) ===
1. General Hospital 11.2
2. All My Children 9.4
3. One Life to Live 9.3
4. Guiding Light 8.0
5. The Young and the Restless 7.4

=== 1982-1983 Season ===
1. General Hospital 9.8
2. All My Children 9.4
3. One Life to Live 8.1
4. The Young and the Restless 8.0
5. As the World Turns 7.6

=== 1983-1984 Season ===
1. General Hospital 10.0
2. All My Children 9.1
3. The Young and the Restless 8.8
4. One Life to Live 8.2
5. Guiding Light 8.1

=== 1984-1985 Season (HH Ratings) ===
1. General Hospital 9.1
2. All My Children 8.2
3. The Young and the Restless 8.1
4. Guiding Light 7.5
5. One Life to Live 7.3

=== 1985-1986 Season ===
1. General Hospital 9.2
2. The Young and the Restless 8.3
3. All My Children 8.0
4. One Life to Live 7.8
5. Days of our Lives 7.2

=== 1986-1987 Season ===
1. General Hospital 8.3
2. The Young and the Restless 8.0
3. One Life to Live 7.2
4. All My Children 7.0
5. Days of our Lives 7.0

=== 1987-1988 Season ===
1. General Hospital 8.1 (#1 in viewers)
2. The Young and the Restless 8.1 (#2 in viewers)
3. One Life to Live 7.7
4. All My Children 7.7
5. Days of our Lives 7.1

=== 1988-1989 Season (HH Ratings) ===
1. The Young and the Restless 8.1
2. General Hospital 7.5
3. One Life to Live 7.1
4. All My Children 6.7
5. Days of our Lives 6.5

== See also ==
- Storylines: 1968–1979
- Storylines: 1990–1999
- Storylines: 2000–2013
