= Mendori =

- village
- Location within Madhya Pradesh Location within India
- Coordinates: 23.186018°N 77.361229°E
- Country: India
- State: Madhya Pradesh
- District: Bhopal
- Tehsil: Huzur

Population (2011)
  - Total: 1,070
- Time zone: UTC+5:30 (IST)
- ISO 3166 code: MP-IN
- Census code: 482545

Mendori is a village in the Bhopal district of Madhya Pradesh, India. It is located in the Huzur tehsil and the Phanda block. The National Law Institute University, The Sanskaar Valley School and the Kerwa Dam reservoir are located nearby.

== Demographics ==
According to the 2011 census of India, Mendori had 243 households. The effective literacy rate (i.e. the literacy rate of population excluding children aged 6 and below) was 59.93%.

Demographics (2011 Census)
	Total	Male	Female
Population	1070	535	535
Children aged below 6 years	149	68	81
Scheduled caste	156	74	82
Scheduled tribe	58	30	28
Literates	552	300	252
Workers (all)	359	262	97
Main workers (total)	177	117	60
Main workers: Cultivators	11	9	2
Main workers: Agricultural labourers	62	35	27
Main workers: Household industry workers	3	3	0
Main workers: Other	101	70	31
Marginal workers (total)	182	145	37
Marginal workers: Cultivators	4	1	3
Marginal workers: Agricultural labourers	165	131	34
Marginal workers: Household industry workers	7	7	0
Marginal workers: Others	6	6	0
Non-workers	711	273	438
