= Mendora =

Mendora may refer to:

- Mendora, Bhopal, a village in India
- Mendora, Nizamabad district, India
- Mendora, Ontario, a community in Canada

== See also ==
- Mendorra, a fictional country in the American soap opera One Life to Live
