= One Life to Live storylines (2000–2013) =

Storylines of American soap opera

One Life to Live is an American soap opera that was broadcast on the ABC network from July 1968 to January 2012, and online from April to August 2013. The series starts with One Life to Live storylines (1968–79). The plot continues in One Life to Live storylines (1980–89). The plot in the next decade is outlined in One Life to Live storylines (1990–1999) and the story concludes in One Life to Live storylines (2000–2013).

== One Life to Live (2000-2013) ==
=== 2000 ===
Into the new millennium, more new characters were introduced, including Lindsay's (Catherine Hickland) sister Melanie (Darlene Vogel) and her husband Colin (Ty Treadway). Colin was killed, but his twin brother was brought on the canvas, only to lose his mind and become a killer. Phelps' tenure saw the departure of a number of long-running actors, such as Laura Koffman (Cassie), Clint Ritchie (Clint), and Strasser (again).

=== 2001 and 2002 ===
Jill Farren Phelps and Megan McTavish left in early 2001, and they were respectively replaced by new executive producer Gary Tomlin and new head writers Lorraine Broderick and Christopher Whitesell. Many of the actors hired under Phelps' tenure were let go. Fan favorite Gabrielle returned after a ten-year absence and romanced Max, then Bo. Storylines became more campy, and the show had a much-acclaimed week in May 2002 where the episodes were broadcast live. This experimentation was mixed with truly dark tales such as Todd selling Blair's baby, telling her the child was dead and then passing him off as an adopted baby when he realized he was the natural father. Another story involved Viki returning to her former split personality Niki Smith to block out the painful memory of being raped by Mitch Laurence (Roscoe Born). She had one child with Clint (Natalie) and the other child (Jessica) was fathered by Mitch. Another storyline was Antonio (Kamar de los Reyes) having a one-night stand with a woman who turned out to be his fiancé Keri's (Sherri Saum) mother, Liz (Barbara Niven). She then implanted her embryo into Keri, meaning that Keri was unknowingly giving birth to her fiancé's child. To the chagrin of many viewers, much airtime was devoted to Lindsay's daughter, Jen (Jessica Morris).

=== 2003 ===
In early 2003, Malone and Josh Griffith were rehired as head writers with Frank Valentini taking over as executive producer. A new major storyline involved Mitch kidnapping sisters, Natalie and Jessica, to figure out which one's heart was a match for their grandfather. Victor had been faking his death. He was too ill to have major confrontations with his children and died a few weeks into the story. Dorian then showed up as Mitch's new bride, and she became enmeshed in a storyline involving a jewel hunt as well as a "curse" that blinded Mitch. Mitch was later killed by Jessica. Another story involved the return of Cord and Tina's daughter, Sarah Roberts, as rock singer Flash (Shanelle Workman). Flash dated, and even kissed, Joey Buchanan (Bruce Michael Hall), her cousin. Joey, who was a minister at the time, then married Jen Rappaport, but the marriage did not last due to her affair with former husband Rex Balsom. Joey was then sent back to London to live with Clint.

Roger Howarth had come and gone several times but quit for good in early 2003. Mitch had him kidnapped. When the character returned several months later, he was posing as Mitch's brother Walker and was played by Trevor St. John. Apparently Todd had been so badly beaten that he had to get extensive plastic surgery. In spite of much fear that viewers would never accept any other actor as Todd, the talented St. John became popular and Todd, for the first time in a decade, had love scenes as well as a semi-functional relationship with Blair.

In April 2003, Dorian Lord returned with plans to strike it rich. She married Mitch Laurence, claiming she "loved him". It was later found out that she married him to pay him back for the harm he did to the Cramer and Buchanan families. Viki developed heart trouble and was saved by a heart transplant from her comatose husband, Ben. One of the most appreciated storylines of the second Malone/Griffith era was Marcie Walsh (Kathy Brier)'s struggle with her self-esteem and her love story with Al Holden (Nathaniel Marston). Inexplicably, Marston was fired, while Al was killed off despite the couple's immense popularity. But a write-in campaign led by Marcal fans convinced ABC to rehire Marston, in spite of his character having died on screen. Al's spirit took over Michael McBain's body, causing the ghost to lose all memories as Al, and court Marcie and Michael. Brooding actor Michael Easton (who had a following as Stephen Clay/Caleb Morley, a singing vampire, on Port Charles) was hired as Michael's cop brother, John McBain. John was introduced as a pool tournament organizer who recruited Natalie for her pool skills. Natalie and John had an instant connection and attraction to each other but Natalie was engaged to Cristian. Unknown to her and Cristian, John was an undercover FBI agent working on a bust to trap Walker Flynn, Mitch Lawrence's brother who had been paid by Todd to use his face as a cover. After Natalie and Cristian wed, they flew to Las Vegas for a high-stakes pool competition against the Black Widow. Antonio, who learned of John's identity at Cristian's bachelor party, joined them in Las Vegas along with Jessica. John told Natalie to lose on purpose or he would kill her and Cristian. When Natalie learned that both Cristian and Roxy bet their life savings on her, she won the tournament. Chaos erupted eventually leading to Cristian Vega's death only a day after he married Natalie. In her grief, Natalie lashed out at John who made it his mission to make it up to her. John was reassigned to the Music Box Killer case in New Jersey but remained in Llanview when the serial killer killed a local Private Investigator, Elyssa Collins (Yvonne Sciò). John worked alongside Bo and Antonio on the case, forming a friendship with both. Eventually, Natalie's heart softened toward John and they began a close friendship. Al's mother, Gabrielle, was murdered by the Music Box Killer, and Al's father, Max, left town, thus removing the Holden family from the canvas. Next came the saga of the Santi mobster family, to whom Antonio learned he was related. To the detriment of ratings (which fell to an all-time low in the summer of 2004), much of the action revolved around new characters: Antonio's brother Tico (who married Jessica Buchanan), stepsister Sonia, and mother Angelina.

=== 2004 ===
Writers Malone and Griffith chose to leave and were replaced by Dena Higley in December 2004. On the day he was to remarry Blair, Todd was kidnapped by the crazed Margaret Cochran, who in a homage to Stephen King's Misery, tied him up for weeks in a secluded cabin while he recovered from his injuries. She then drugged him and forced him to have sex in order to impregnate herself, a throwback to his history of rape. Margaret then conspired to get rid of Todd's wife, Blair, by locking her in the trunk of her car. Margaret became pregnant and stabbed Todd because he tried to strangle her. To keep her away from his family, Todd took Margaret to a lake, and she never came back to shore. A few weeks later, her body and the unborn child washed up on shore. Todd was arrested for the crime and was tried for first-degree murder and sent to death row. Todd was trying to prove his innocence with the help of Evangeline (his lawyer), but did he or someone else kill Margaret?

=== 2005 ===
A storyline played out in 2005 in which Nora's (Hillary B. Smith) new husband, politician Daniel Colson (Mark Dobies) was revealed to be Paul Cramer's murderer. He first framed his son's girlfriend Jennifer Rappaport (Jessica Morris) for the crime, and then suffocated her when she learned the truth. But the revelation that his killing spree was all to cover up his homosexuality proved controversial in the media.

During this time, Natalie's husband, Cristian Vega, was in Statesville Prison. Attorney Evangeline Williamson took over his case and won, which led to the release of Cristian Vega. After Cristian's release, Evangeline and Cristian grew closer and fell in love.

Nora's health took a downturn after she suffered a massive stroke during an argument with Bo about Paige. She remained in a coma for several months, but eventually made a full recovery.

Jessica, meanwhile, had developed a split personality, changing into bad girl "Tess" who goaded Viki into having a heart attack. Jess/Tess become pregnant either by Jessica's boyfriend, Antonio, or Tess's boyfriend, Nash (who has a past of his own). Concerned that the baby was actually Antonio's, Tess destroyed the sample that would identify the actual father. Viki then became Niki Smith and kidnapped Jessica, forcing her to become Tess in order to finally discover what made Tess emerge and would destroy Viki forever. Tess refused to tell Niki her secret because if anyone knew, Jessica would integrate into the dominant personality. Determined to know what happened to their daughter, Viki and Clint returned to the bar where Niki had taken Jessica when she was a child. The evidence pointed to a house a couple of blocks away from the bar, where they discovered VHS tapes buried underneath the house labeled with Tess's name as well as those of other young girls. Viki and Clint decided to give the evidence to Bo, but before Tess's tape could be released to the police, Viki and Clint begged Bo to let them see what had happened to their daughter. Jessica's abuse at the hands of a pedophile led to the original creation of the "Tess" personality. Jessica gave birth to a little girl named Brennan (or Bree for short), and the father was later revealed to be Nash. Tess and Jess were later integrated, and Jessica married Antonio Vega.

=== 2006 ===
May 2006 was a month with both tragedies and happier times for Llanview. Duke Buchanan, son of Kevin Buchanan, was injured after a tornado wreaked havoc on the town during Michael McBain and Marcie Walsh's wedding. Kevin was heartbroken as he was forced to choose who would get a life-saving surgery and chose Kelly over Duke. Kelly survived but Duke died. Kelly became pregnant with Duke's baby and later gave birth to a premature baby, Zane Buchanan. Kelly, Kevin, and the baby left Llanview to start life anew in London.

It turned out that Spencer Truman, revealed to be David Vickers' half brother, framed Todd Manning by faking Margaret's death, wiping her memory, and gave Margaret's baby away. David Vickers, Natalie Buchanan, and John McBain later found a very-much-alive Margaret in Thailand. She had no memory of what happened to her or her baby. On Todd's execution day, John stormed into the execution chamber with Margaret in tow. By then, Todd had already been given the injections and Blair was devastated. Blair was shocked to find that Margaret was alive and Todd was telling the truth all along. She begged Spencer to save Todd, and he did.

Meanwhile, the police talked to Margaret about what happened. She did not remember anything of what happened but later regained her memory during transport to jail. Unfortunately, the van she was in was involved in an accident and she was killed.

Later, Blair realized that Spencer was indeed behind the framing of Todd. She helped the Llanview police by getting proof that Spencer may have killed John's father, not David, as had previously been thought. He was arrested and put on trial.

In August 2006, Dorian's daughter, Adriana Cramer (Melissa Fumero), was kidnapped by Bruce Bartlett, and held for ransom. Bruce was killed and Adriana was rescued by Rex Balsom (John-Paul Lavoisier) and Dorian, but the damage was done. Adriana was angry at her mother's involvement. Dorian had hired Bruce to stalk Adriana because she despised Adriana's boyfriend, Rex, and did everything she could to cause them to break up. Adriana moved out but was later reconciled with her mother on Christmas Day, at the urgency of Carlotta Vega.

Hugh Hughes learned that Paige and Spencer were his biological parents. Just after Hugh found out about that, there was a major car accident involving the car in which he was traveling with John McBain. Michael McBain went with Bo to identify the body and it turned out to be John. Everybody thought that John had died. However, later, everyone soon learned that John was the one in a hospital burn unit, and Hugh was the casualty. After being released to a sterile environment, John failed to take his medication properly, forcing Natalie to put it in his food. John discovered what Natalie was doing, and they broke up.

Cristian's return from the dead didn't thrill the art world, so Cris became a boxer. New arrival Vincent Jones (One Life to Live) became Cris' manager, but was working to make it look as though Cris botched a fight. Cris lost his boxing career, and Vincent was cleared of all charges. However, Layla was not willing to forgive Vincent, until after an encounter with death. A racist arsonist began targeting Llanview, causing the death of Ted Osbourne and the catatonic state of Evangeline Williamson. Vincent, Layla, Adriana and Rex were almost killed and all were shocked to learn that ex-baseball player Tate Harmon was the arsonist. Tate was apprehended and sent to prison.

Starr Manning found new love with a boy named Cole Thornhart. After a roid rage on Cole's part, Cole was arrested, and the Mannings were baffled to discover that Cole was the son of Marty Saybrooke and Patrick Thornhart. With their parents forbidding them to see each other, Starr and Cole eventually continued their relationship in secret. Overcoming several roadblocks, Cole and Starr got their happy ending during prom night. Due to the threat of Lee Ramsey, Todd set plans to move his family to Hawaii, forcing Starr to have one last special night with Cole. Cole and Starr had sex for the first time, but were interrupted by Todd. Surviving Todd's multiple beatings, Cole was again forbidden from seeing Starr. But Starr soon learned that she was pregnant, and telling Cole, ran away. Todd caught up with them, with Blair learning the truth. Wanting Marcie and Michael to adopt her baby, Starr began fighting with Cole, who wanted to keep the baby as a legacy of his deceased parents. Cole came clean with Todd about the pregnancy, and the two worked together to prevent Starr from giving the baby away.

Spencer was deemed unfit to stand trial and was to be sent to Wingdale. Todd abducted Spencer and tortured him for information on the whereabouts of his missing son with Margaret. In a freak accident, Todd, Spencer, and Blair ended up on the roof of a warehouse from which Blair and Spencer fell. Both survived, and Blair revealed to Todd that she was pregnant with his child. Blair soon miscarried, and was diagnosed with a heart disease, but survived. Spencer killed his attorney, Marc Casey, and nearly raped Blair, until an unknown assailant stabbed him repeatedly from behind. Michael, Rex, David, and Marty were each arrested for the murder but Lindsay turned out to be the true culprit. Her motive was to silence Spencer, in order to keep the truth from Marcie that Tommy (her adoptive son with Michael) was really Todd's son. Rex (who knew the truth about Tommy) gave Todd a phony death certificate, but Todd soon got a lead on his son, which took him to Chicago. Todd was stabbed and went missing, later turning up in the apartment of Hunter Atwood, the boyfriend of Sarah Roberts. Todd was soon free, and Hunter was accidentally stabbed by Cristian Vega. Miles Laurence gave Todd proof that Tommy was his son, and Todd interrupted Lindsay's murder trial to reveal the truth. Todd soon won custody, but Marcie kidnapped Tommy and went on the run. Marcie was eventually apprehended, and Tommy was given back to Todd, who renamed him Sam. John blackmailed Todd into dropping the charges against Marcie and posting her bail.

Miles Laurence, brother to Mitch, arrived in town as Spencer's heir. Miles had spent his entire life in an institution because his family wanted nothing to do with him due to the disfigurement caused by tumors on his face. Spencer replaced Miles's face, thereby making Miles eternally indebted to Spencer. Socially-inexperienced Miles fell in unrequited love with Marty. Suffering from panic attacks, Marty remembered killing Spencer, and admitted so to her psychiatrist. Miles got his hand on the tape used to record Marty's session and used this to blackmail Marty into marrying him. Marty had no choice but to give in, and she married him. Learning that Miles was holding a missing Todd captive and blackmailing Cole, Marty turned Miles in. Miles was later released on bail, and was befriended by Natalie. Miles was devastated to learn that Marty died in an explosion as the result of a showdown with Irish terrorists.

Lindsay faked a nervous breakdown and was institutionalized. Nora suspected that Lindsay faked her condition but never gained proof. Lindsay was released into the custody of Bo, and the two began to fall in love once more. Lindsay received a letter from R.J. that soon got mixed up in Nora's paperwork. Lindsay got her hands on the letter, burning it, but not realizing that Nora's assistant had made copies of all of the papers. Nora read the letter, ending Bo and Lindsay's marriage before it began. Lindsay was arrested and plead guilty to murder during her trial.

Clint fell in love with Dorian, but his returning feelings for Viki weren't as strong, and he chose Dorian. After the death of Asa Buchanan, Dorian learned that Langston Wilde was an orphan living on her own since her parents' death over a year earlier. Dorian became Langston's foster mother, which caused Dorian to miss out on the reading of Asa's will. However, Dorian made it to Texas with the newly married David Vickers and Alex Olanov. Dorian caught Clint and Nora in a liplock and had sex with David. Clint walked in on them and broke things off with Dorian.

Breaking up with Evangeline for kissing Todd, Cristian began to suspect that Jessica and Nash were fooling around behind Antonio's back. Jess convinced Cris that this wasn't the case. Antonio asked Jess to adopt Jamie and become her mother, but Jess ran out of the courtroom during the adoption hearing. She ended up in the arms of Nash, and they had sex for the first time. However, Jessica collapsed in Antonio's arms as she was about to tell the truth. But before the truth could come out, Jess was diagnosed with Hepatitis C and liver cancer as a result of Tess sharing heroin needles. The truth came out, and Antonio left Jess and the country, only to then be revealed as a match for a liver transplant. The transplant was successful, but after their divorce hearing, Jess was back in the hospital, where her body rejected Antonio's liver. David was also found as a match, and just before surgery, Nash married Jessica. The transplant was successful, but David wanted $10,000,000 before he agreed to the transplant. Viki learned the truth, and in an attempt to regain their friendship, David gave the money back to Clint, and Viki forgave David.

=== 2007 ===
Viki Davidson wound up on an adventure of her own when she left Llanview for Paris, Texas, in 2007. She began working at a diner as a waitress and fell in love with Charlie Banks, Jared's father. Viki then realized that Charlie was an alcoholic. He turned back to the bottle after failing to reconnect with his son. Viki helped him recover and then she was stunned to see that Marcie Walsh was in Texas and on the run with Tommy/Sam, Todd Manning's son.

=== 2008 ===
Marcie was running out of options and took Viki hostage as 2008 rolled in. Viki and Sam were rescued and Marcie was finally captured. Viki returned home, Charlie soon followed, and they reunited. However, they were not happy for long, as Charlie lied that he was Rex's father, and then Dorian Lord set it up to make it look as if Charlie was drinking again, resulting in the breakup of Viki and Charlie. In July 2008, Viki and Dorian were in a horrible car accident where Viki dies as a result of the crash. Dorian briefly thinks about not saving Viki. However, Dorian ultimately comes to her archenemy's aid, and with a shot of adrenaline straight to Viki's heart, Dorian, with David and Mel's spirit by her side, is able to revive Viki. After re-examining her life Viki and Charlie reunite in December 2008, after Charlie rebuilt Carlotta's diner to resemble the same Paris Texas diner where they fell in love.

After being cleared of Spencer's murder and annulling her marriage to Miles, Marty began a relationship with John. But, during the search for Marcie, Marty was abducted by an Irish terrorist and was reunited with Cole in Ireland. John and Ramsey arrived on the scene, forcing terrorist Simon to take Marty and Cole in a van. Ramsey shot the van's tires, causing the van to go over a cliff. Cole was thrown from the vehicle and survived. Marty did not. However, Ramsey was nursing a mystery woman back to health. This woman turned out to be Marty. After Ramsey's murder, Todd discovered an amnesiac Marty and began taking care of her, failing to share their history. This sparked a very controversial plot where Marty fell in love with Todd and they eventually had sex. John discovered that Todd had Marty captive and raced to rescue her. Marty then felt cornered as John and Todd began to argue that she held them both at gunpoint and then learned everything that Todd did to her and she shot him! These events sent Marty on a months long wild streak until she eventually began to regain her memory and reunited with her son Cole.

Tina Lord, princess of Mendorra, returned to Llanview looking for the crown jewels of Mendorra, which had been stolen by Ramsey. After Ramsey was murdered, Tina took the jewels, only to be held at gun point by American ambassador to Mendorra Jonas Chamberlain. As Cristian and Sarah hid Tina, Jonas came upon Talia, whom he forced to trick Sarah into a trap. Jonas kidnapped Talia and Sarah to Mendorra, where Carlo Hesser revealed himself as Talia's father. Antonio was beyond not pleased to learn of this truth, while Sarah was reunited with Tina and Cristian only to be sent over the Hohenstein Falls by Carlo's army in order to haunt Tina for killing his son Johnny Dee Hesser in 1990. Carlo's plan was designed to be cruelly reminiscent of Tina's having gone over Argentina's Iguazu Falls in the '80s. Tina's prince turned out to be none other than Cain Rogan. Then Carlo planned to have Cain and Tina executed in front of the people of Mendorra, until Christian rescued them. Sarah was then revealed to be alive. Chris and Sarah reunite, but Antonio must say goodbye to Talia, as she is held prisoner until they return and rescue her.

Dorian was very angry with the Buchanans when she discovered that Jared Banks (John Brotherton) was posing as Asa's long-lost son and having an affair with his supposed niece, Natalie Buchanan (Melissa Archer). She exposed the truth at a Buchanan Enterprises shareholders' meeting, then announced that she had taken over the company. These events spiraled out of control, as Jared and Nash Brennan got into a fistfight that resulted in Nash falling through a skylight to his death, leaving daughter Bree, wife Jessica, and his unborn baby behind. This sent Jessica turning back to her alter, Tess, who planned to murder Natalie and Jared because she blamed them for Nash's death. Tess sent Viki packing to Africa, had the secret room rebuilt, and then held Natalie hostage down there. Tess continued pretending to be Jess, but Tina Lord (who had moved into Llanfair) realized that Jess was Tess. Tess blackmailed Tina into keeping her mouth shut. Jared eventually realized the truth, only to wind up trapped with Natalie for a short while before Viki returned home. Running out of options and going into labor, Tess left Nat and Jared locked up with a bomb set to go off. Tess ran off and gave birth to a stillborn baby while confronting the illusion of her mother Viki's alter, Niki Smith. Jess then secretly gained a third alter, Bess, who switched her dead baby with the living baby of Starr Manning and Cole Thornhart, who was born on the same night. Charlie and Viki rescued Nat and Jared just before the bomb was set to explode.

Meanwhile, the love story of Rex and Gigi Morasco (Farah Fath) began as Rex was set to wed Dorian's daughter Adriana (May 2008). Gigi and her 10-year-old son, Shane Morasco (Austin Williams), arrived in Llanview. Gigi and Rex had had a teen romance. She lost her virginity to Rex and wound up pregnant, but he left town and never knew about his son, who was raised by war hero, Brody Lovett (Mark Lawson). Gigi interrupted Rex and Adriana's wedding to tell Rex she loves him, only to end up punched by Adriana. Gigi then gets the shock of her life when, thanks to Adriana's schemes, Brody arrives alive and well. Shane thinks that Brody is his father, so Gigi keeps mum about Shane's paternity. Rex leaves Adriana, who then leaves town for Paris, France. Rex and Gigi fall back in love, but when Bo and Rex are in a horse riding accident that leaves them knocked out during a storm, they are taken back in time—to 1968, the year One Life to Live began. This storyline was part of OLTL's 40th anniversary. Gigi subsequently travels back in time and rescues them. Gigi and Rex tell Shane that Rex, not Brody, is his father. This sets Brody off and he kidnaps Shane. It is then revealed that Brody had a traumatic experience in Iraq, in which he shot a 10-year-old boy by accident. Rex, Gigi, and Bo set out to rescue Shane, and in the standoff, Rex is shot. Brody is sent to a mental institution and Rex soon recovers.

Jessica and Brody meet at St. Anne's, where they are recovering from their traumas and begin to fall in love.

Jared and Natalie realize that Chloe isn't Jessica and Nash's baby, but in fact Starr and Cole's. They agree to keep quiet for Jess's safety but, in May, Bess returns and having run out of options, kidnaps baby Chloe and goes on the run. Viki poses as her alter, Jean Randolph, to convince Bess to back down and return the baby. Jessica accepts what she has done and reunites with Brody.

=== 2009 ===
In the aftermath of their daughter's "death," Starr and Cole begin to fall apart. She falls for one of her teachers, Schuyler. This angers Cole, who gets high, then gets behind the wheel with Matthew in the car. A crash results in Matthew becoming paralyzed from the waist down. Cole is sent to rehab and then gets out, soon reunited with his mother. He then learns that his baby with Starr is alive. Starr and Cole are reunited with their daughter, but have already agreed to give the baby up to Michael and Marcie, since Starr didn't have the heart to break her promise to Marcie. Marcie realizes how much the baby means to Starr and returns the baby to her. Starr and Cole reunite in time and bond with their daughter who they have named Hope.

Jessica, Brody, Natalie, and Jared realize that someone is stalking them. When Wayne Landers and Pamela Stewart end up murdered, and Jared is the prime suspect, he goes on the run but Natalie has faith that her husband is innocent. Brody is lured to Michigan by his sister, and when Natalie turns to Rex for help, he is also lured to Michigan by his aunt. While Jessica and Natalie are lured to Napa Valley, where they find Jared and are held hostage by a still-alive Mitch Laurence, who has dug up Nash's corpse. John and Brody team up to rescue the women, and Viki and Charlie arrive to help them. Jared is shot by Mitch and dies in Natalie's arms. Natalie becomes unhinged and Charlie turns back to the bottle. Natalie stabs Mitch at the LPD, but John covers up the crime. Natalie begins to fall in love with John, but when Marty gets pregnant, John's love goes to Natalie, Someone pushes Marty down the stairs, and Todd and Natalie are the main suspects.

Viki runs in the next campaign to become Llanview's mayor following her and Charlie's double wedding with Clint and Nora, putting her against the villainous Mayor Lowell and Dorian Lord, who has agreed to become his campaign manager in order to assure that he wins. Meanwhile, John and Cole have teamed up to expose Llanview's drug ring in the middle of which, Starr and Hope are kidnapped by mobsters. This results in Shaun being shot and falling into a coma, and Brody being shot as he tries to rescue mother and daughter. John then arrests ringleader Mayor Lowell during a campaign rally for the election, where Lowell had called Viki out on all of her past. With Lowell in prison for his many crimes, Dorian decides to campaign in the election and uses gay-marriage rights to do just that. Dorian announces that she is in love with her gay campaign manager, Amelia, and they plan to tie the knot along with 21 other same-sex couples, which includes Nick and Kyle. Viki ends up winning the election. but when the Lord family matters have become far too serious, Viki steps down as mayor and Dorian becomes Llanview's next mayor. Unfortunately for her, Mitch is back in Llanview. He blackmails Dorian into firing Bo Buchanan as the police commissioner and Nora Hanen as the District Attorney at the Mayor's Ball on New Year's Eve.

Layla Williamson (Tika Sumpter) began a relationship with gay-but-closeted Oliver Fish (Scott Evans). Layla eventually realizes that he is gay, and she and Cristian help him come out to the world while they fall in love themselves, despite feeling like they were betraying Evangeline. Fish reunites with his past love Kyle Lewis (Brett Claywell) at Dorian's big gay wedding, leaving Kyle's former fiancé Nick Chavez jealous.

Matthew's paralysis brings Nora and Bo closer together. They fall back in love and have an affair, despite that Clint and Nora had just tied the knot in August. Clint learns about the affair and kicks them out of the Buchanan Mansion.

Gigi's sister, Stacy Morasco (Crystal Hunt), arrives from Las Vegas as an ex-stripper and sets her sights on Rex: having sex with him, faking a pregnancy, miscarrying that baby, having sex with Oliver Fish to get pregnant again, making Rex think she never miscarried, and making Stacy's ex-boyfriend Schuyler Joplin (Scott Clifton) think the baby is his. Her stripper friend, Kimberly Andrews (Amanda Setton), helps her out. Gigi and Rex break up, as Gigi falls for Schuyler and Rex is told that Mitch Laurence is his father. Mitch sets his sights on Stacy's baby to use in his cult. Gigi ends up delivering Stacy's baby at Viki's cabin on Llantano Mountain. Soon after, Stacy apparently dies as she falls in the frozen lake, though her body is never recovered. Gigi promises to take care of Sierra Rose, since she and her sister forgave each other during the delivery. Sierra needs surgery and Gigi finds out that Schuyler is the baby's father and that he'd known the truth for a while. She bans Schuyler from her life and sets her eyes one Rex once again. Fish doubts the baby is his but is having second thoughts. Gigi and Rex become closer, knowing they still love one another. Kim marries Clint Buchanan to get custody of Sierra Rose. Many battle for custody of Sierra Rose. Gigi proposes to Rex.

In 2009, a very convoluted story arc began as Todd, Tea, Blair, Starr, and many others surrounding Todd were targeted by a killer known as the KAD. Talia, Wes, and Lee Halpern are all killed, and Blair is attacked in the shower in a scene that echoes the film, Psycho. In May 2009, the killer is revealed to be Powell Lord, Todd's cousin and another one of Marty's rapists. Powell's accomplice is former Tabernacle of Joy cultist, Rebecca Lewis. The two kidnap Todd, Tea, Blair, and Marty and hold them captive in the very room in which Marty was raped years ago. An explosion goes off, and Powell and Rebecca are captured. This results in the reunion of Todd and Tea, of which Blair gets jealous. Todd realizes that Tea is keeping a secret from him, and does a little investigating. Blair tracks down Ross Rayburn in Tahiti and learns that the two are still married. Ross stops Blair from telling Todd during his and Tea's wedding, then Blair learns Tea and Ross have a child, Danielle, together, who was in London at a boarding school with Matthew Buchanan and Destiny Evans. Ross becomes determined to get his daughter back, kidnapping Blair and Danielle. He ends up cornered on a bridge and, in the melee, falls to his presumed death. Tea and Todd break up and Danielle vows revenge for the death of her father.

=== 2010 ===
Jessica has memory loss and remembers only high school. She goes back to high school and sets her eyes on Cris (her ex from high school, who's now teaching there) thinking they're still together. Brody loses hope for a reunion with Jessica but doesn't give up.

Viki Davidson and Charlie Banks tie the knot in a double ceremony with Clint and Nora, despite the fact that Nora is really in love with Bo. Dorian Lord and Blair Cramer crash the nuptials in a drunken fit.

Markko's teacher, Robert Ford (David A. Gregory), begins to seduce his girlfriend, Langston, and Cole gets a new project partner named Hannah O'Connor (Meghann Fahy). Hannah's ex is Ford and she wants him back, even though he only used her for sex. Hannah later sets her sights on Starr's boyfriend Cole. Hannah tries to seduce Cole after finding out that Starr might be cheating on Cole with Ford's little brother James Ford (Nicolas Robuck). Hannah even goes far as to kidnapping Starr, James, and Hope, and force them to bury themselves alive on Halloween so that she could get Cole all to herself! Hannah is later caught and sent to prison on kidnapping charges. Cole later goes to prison himself for killing evil serial killer lawyer Elijah Clarke (Matt Walton), (who was married to Blair Cramer at the time, and is the brother of con artist and beach bum surfer Ross Rayburn (Michael Lowry, Billy Warlock), who is also Dani's adoptive father) because Cole thought that he kidnapped Starr and Hope.

When Gigi is kidnapped by Schuyler, Bo and Rex unite to stop him and save her. In the ensuing struggle, Bo is shot by Schuyler. Though he is in critical condition, he pulls through and following the incident, asks Nora to marry him. Scuyler later ends up in prison for shooting Bo. It is also revealed that Schuyler is the long-lost son of Roxy Balsom and former evil cult leader Mitch Laurence.

Matthew begins to date Tea and Todd's newly discovered long-lost daughter, Danielle Rayburn (Kelley Missal), much to the chagrin of his pal, Destiny Evans, who is secretly in love with Matthew. When she does confess her feelings, Matthew suggests they stay friends. However, when they all audition for Starr and Langston's musical, Dani wins the lead as Starr, and Destiny wins the role of Langston. Matthew, originally auditioning for Cole, gets the part of Markko, hinting that Matthew and Destiny will become close.

David Vickers blackmails Clint's wife Kim out of Llanview and out of her marriage to Clint by threatening to expose a mysterious secret about her to Clint. Kim then tells Clint she is leaving town and breaking up with him because she is legally married to someone else. After Kim leaves town, Clint hires private investigators to search for Kim, but her whereabouts are still unknown.

Cristian and Layla become engaged but then learn that Evangeline's condition has worsened and she will never recover from her accident. Layla faces the tough choice to taking her sister off life support after clashing with her mother she takes Evangeline off life support, leaving her, her mother and Cristian devastated. Layla later moves to Paris to resume her fashion career and ends her engagement to Cristian.

As the year drew to a close, the Ford Brothers are reunited with their abusive father, Eddie Ford, (John Wesley Shipp) (This was also after the fact that the brothers discovered their family ties after their mother Inez Salinger (Jessica Leccia) told them they were related to each other. Dani's classmate Nate Salinger's (Lenny Platt) mother had abandoned Ford and James with their father while she was pregnant with Nate.) Eddie comes to town after Nate had stolen a hidden suitcase full of money to give to her broke mother, and crashes at his sons' Ford and James' apartment. Eddie is later hired by Clint to kidnap Nora and hold her hostage at The Minute Man Motel to avenge her for cheating on him with his brother and her ex-husband Bo. Bo later rescues Nora from Eddie's clutches. Eddie is later discovered to be shot and murdered in cold blood in his motel room. A few months later, it was revealed that Bo and Nora's son Matthew killed Eddie Ford.

=== 2011 ===
Natalie sleeps with Brody after Jessica gets tortured by Mitch Lawerence and gets amnesia, thinking she's still in high school and dating Cristian, and John is still with Marty. Jessica has sex with Ford and has no idea if Ford or Brody is the father of her baby. Natalie has no idea if Brody or John is the father of her baby. It is later revealed that Robert Ford is the father of Jessica's baby, and Brody is the father of Natalie's baby (although it is later revealed that John McBain is the real father of Natalie's baby!) Tea's brother Tomas Delgado (Ted King) shows up after painting a picture of Blair from an old wedding picture of her and Todd. We later find out that the guy we thought was Todd Manning for the past eight years isn't really Todd Manning and that the real Todd Manning has been held in some sort of laboratory for all this time, thanks to Todd and Tina's mother Irene Manning!. Irene later reveals that the fake Todd is actually the real Todd's twin brother Victor Lord, Jr.! Irene put Todd in her facility after he was buried alive by Mitch in 2003, and he had his twin brother Victor Jr. (who she also held in her facility!) get plastic surgery to look like Walker Laurence, and to also pretend to be the real Todd, programmed with all of Todd's memories to make everyone else think he was the real deal. Meanwhile, as John and Natalie struggle with their feelings Marty suffers a nervous breakdown that leads her to kidnap Natalie's baby, push Natalie off a roof and stab Kelly Cramer. Kelly, having returned after her mother died realizes she still loves Joey Buchanan (now played by Tom Degnan) who returns at Thanksgiving in 2010, but is engaged to a woman named Aubrey Wentworth (played by former As the World Turns star Terri Conn). It is later revealed that Aubrey is a con artist working with her secret lover, and fellow con artist and her partner in crime Cutter Wentworth (Josh Kelly). However, over time Aubrey soon falls in love with Joey but when Joey finds out about Aubrey and Cutter's scam against him, Joey divorces Aubrey, and Joey and Kelly fall back in love with each other again before they both return to London to spend more time with Kelly's son Zane.

Matthew and Destiny Evans finally enter into a relationship and later have sex. Soon after though Matthew is punched by Nate Salinger and is declared brain dead while Destiny discovers she is pregnant with Matthew's child. Jessica's memory returns but her happiness is short lived as Tess returns and wreaks havoc in Llanview. She marries Robert Ford but later divorces him and marries Cutter who is still hell bent on getting the Buchanan money. Cutter later blackmails and extorts from Clint a piece of the Buchanan fortune, along with ownership of The Buchanan Mansion, in exchange for committing Tess/Jessica into St. Anne's after being fed up with all of her DID alters. Cutter later loses ownership of the mansion (and is also divorced from Tess/Jessica when Aubrey's friend Rama Patel (Shenaz Treasurywala) blackmails Cutter with a "dirty little secret" that he's been hiding from Aubrey when Ford presents him with divorce papers so that he can freely marry Tess after Ford helps her escape from St. Anne's.) when Clint relinquishes the deed from him (thanks to a loophole in the deed stating Clint can take back the mansion from him anytime he wanted to!) to give the mansion to Rex after he extorts it from Clint in exchange for his estranged father to get his dead fiancé Gigi's heart after Clint had a heart attack. Cutter also loses his piece of the family fortune when the Buchanans take most of it back from him when he didn't stash most of the cash in the bank.

Cutter later ends up in the Minute Man Motel sharing a motel room with his now ex-girlfriend Aubrey (they broke up after Cutter found out that she fell in love with her mark Joey, but later got back together after he was kicked out of the Buchanan Mansion and lost his share of the Buchanan fortune) and Rama (Rama and her husband Vimal Patel (Nick Choksi) were Cutter's houseguests when he owned The Buchanan Mansion). David is rescued from a Morocco prison by Bo and Rex, and after being held hostage at St. Blaze's island by Alex Olanov. David returns to Llanview where he and Dorian reunite and marry for a third time. Viki's marriage to Charlie Banks hits rocky roads when he continues to briefly relapse into alcoholism and when Echo DiSavoy returns to town, revealing to be an old lover of Charlie's after she left Llanview in 1983. Soon enough Echo manipulates Charlie's grief over losing his sons, his alcoholism to enter into an affair. It is later discovered that Echo is in fact Rex Balsom's biological mother, and though she states that Charlie is the man's father in a way to grow closer to him it is really Clint who is Rex's father. However, Clint informs Echo that he knew he was Rex's father since Shane got sick and his blood was a perfect match for Shane's stem cells. Yet, he sees Rex as a gold digger and refuses to acknowledge him as his son.

Langston leaves Llanview after she receives an offer to write a script for David's autobiographical film in California. As she leaves she and Starr share a tearful goodbye and she is pleasantly surprised to learn that the director is none other than Markko. Being given a second chance Langston and Markko leave Llanview. Starr begins a romance with Ford's other younger brother, James, while Danielle dates Nate. However, the return of James's ex-girlfriend, Deanna Forbes (Nafessa Williams), complicates things and sparks jealousy in Starr. Viki and Charlie divorce and she and Dorian again form a friendship... although only tentatively. Blair then begins developing feelings for Tea's brother, Tomas, after Todd is shot. However, she remains wary after her marriage to Elijah which ended after he revealed himself to be a con artist/killer. It is later revealed Tomas is estranged from his own wife (Yvette) and son Sebastian "Baz." Bo and Nora repair their marriage after the whole Eddie Ford/Clint mess tears them apart.

Rex and Gigi become engaged but focus more on Shane being the target of bully, Jack Manning. As Blair tells Jack to stop he refuses to relent, even after his actions nearly cause Shane to commit suicide. As Jack and his pals later plan to pull a prank on him in an abandoned house, Gigi uncovers their plot and goes to speak with them. After she falls into the prank herself she is locked into a room filled with carbon monoxide. After being discovered and taken to the hospital she is declared brain dead and Rex faces the tough decision of giving her heart to Clint after he suffers a heart attack and needs a new heart to live. Rex ultimately decides to give his father Gigi's heart in exchange for The Buchanan Mansion and the entire family fortune. Rex later sees visions of his recently deceased wife Gigi as a ghost telling him to "don't give up". Rex then drops his revenge scheme against the Mannings to investigate his visions of Gigi. Rex, along with his sister Natalie later travels to Anchorage, Kentucky to go to a strip club called The Spotted Pony thanks to a tip from David Vickers, and spots Clint's ex-wife Kim Andrews working as a stripper there! Kim tells Rex he doesn't know anything about why he's being haunted by Gigi, but after he talks to Rex, she later visits her presumed best friend and Gigi's sister Stacy Morasco in the hospital, who was actually in a coma for several months after she showed up at the strip club to reveal to Kim that she survived drowning in that frozen lake she fell in, and later got plastic surgery so that she could look like Gigi so that she could take over her life! Kim later found Stacy in the trapped rental home basement with Gigi where she rescued Stacy, and put her into the hospital in Kentucky.

Kim also reunited with her estranged older brother Cutter, which led to the discovery that Kim was the real Aubrey Wentworth and got plastic surgery to improve her looks. Cutter later betrayed her sister by framing her for his murderous crime that he committed at The Spotted Pony (which was the secret that Rama had on Cutter!) so that he could use Stacy to pose as Gigi for leverage to scam the Buchanans for their fortune again after Aubrey dumped him for the second time for lying about hiding Rex's gun that was a piece of evidence against Rex for Victor Jr.'s murder case (despite Cutter trying to reform himself by getting a legit job as the front desk clerk at The Minute Man Motel). Cutter then told Rex to hand over the entire fortune to him in exchange for getting his wife back when he tried to show him a picture of Gigi on his cell phone. Rex didn't believe him, and got into a fight with him! After Stacy woke up from her coma, she reluctantly agreed to take part in Cutter's scam after she found out that she remembered that she was Stacy, but later changed her mind and wanted to reverse her plastic surgery to look like her old self again. Cutter agreed to her decision and accompanied her to Rio de Janeiro, Brazil to get her surgery from Dr. Fascinella, the same plastic surgeon that did her original surgery. Cutter then reunited with her long-lost mother Alex Olanov, who abandoned her family when she took off with a piece of her wealthy husband William J. "Billy Joe" Wentworth's fortune which led to him to commit suicide when Cutter and Kim where kids, which caused them to both wind up in the foster care system. Alex tried to make up for abandoning Cutter and Kim by helping him and Stacy evade Rex and Aubrey when they were hot on their trail to expose his scam by posing as Stacy after her "surgery". After Alex helped Cutter and Stacy, Cutter then developed romantic feelings for Stacy, and planted a kiss on her! Rex and Aubrey also developed feelings for each other as well and they kissed each other while they were in Rio. Rex and Aubrey then discovered that Stacy was still alive and had plastic surgery to look like Gigi when they both obtained Dr. Fascinella's patients' files. Cutter then took Stacy to meet Dr. Fascinella, where he then told him that Stacy was really Gigi, and that Stacy was the one who really died in that basement from the toxic fumes! Cutter then lied to Gigi saying that she couldn't get the surgery because of the toxic fumes she was exposed to as "Stacy", and he also let Gigi believe that she was still her sister Stacy since Gigi couldn't remember anything about her life. Cutter and Gigi then left Rio to move to Paris, Texas, where Gigi and her son Shane used to live at before they moved to Llanview a few years ago. Cutter and "Stacy" got jobs at The Bon Jour Cafe, where Gigi once worked as a waitress.

Rex then went back to Paris, TX with Shane to attend a "pie-off" contest where Gigi's old co-worker Noelle Stubbs entered a pie named in Gigi's honor. Gigi then spotted Rex at the diner, and Cutter helped her hide from him before he could spot her working at the diner. Rex then found "Stacy" and confronted her for getting plastic surgery to look like Gigi. Cutter then showed up at the diner and told Rex that "Stacy" was really Gigi, but Rex didn't believe him and had him finally arrested for his old crime at The Spotted Pony, thanks to a tip from his sister Kim, who was exonerated from prison in exchange for telling Rex the truth and whereabouts of "Stacy". Professor Delfina Jr., whose father helped Rex and Gigi return to the present day from 1968 when they both time travelled to the past, helped convince Rex that "Stacy" was really Gigi by showing him the events that led to Stacy's death thanks to the professor's time travelling TV device! Rex then finally learned the truth, and Rex brought Gigi back home to Llanview where everyone found out that she was still alive. Rex also broke the news about Gigi to Aubrey, and they broke up with each other before Aubrey left town heartbroken about the end of their potential relationship. After Kim tried unsuccessfully to get back together with Clint after he admitted to her that he was back in love with his ex-wife Viki, Kim got a call from Cutter in prison to get help from her to break him out of prison. Kim refused to help his brother after he betrayed her and framed her for his crime despite the fact that he told her the truth about Stacy/Gigi, and that he found their now wealthy mother back in Rio. Cutter then decides to call Alex to help him get out of prison. Rex and Gigi finally married each other in front of their friends and family at Llanfair on New Year's Eve 2011.

=== 2012 ===
In the series' final weeks, there is a massive breakout at Statesville Prison. Many of Llanview's old enemies return to wreak havoc on those that put them behind bars. Nora is kidnapped by Troy MacIver and taken to his cabin on Llantano Mountain. Troy desperately wants Nora to return his love, and leave Bo for him. She plays along with him in order for Bo to come to her rescue. Bo is aided in saving Nora by Lindsay Rappaport who helps Bo initially subdue Troy and save Nora. The two women then end their feud after Lindsay helps save Nora's life. However, Bo is shot by Troy, who after an emotional plea by Nora tries to revive Bo. Bo awakens in heaven and is greeted by Gabrielle Medina who tells him it is time to cross over so they can be together. Though tempted, Bo declares Nora is the love of his life and is miraculously revived. Meanwhile, Mitch Laurence kidnaps Natalie and holds her hostage until Jessica surrenders herself to him. Though Clint tries to stop him, he is knocked unconscious. Cole (now played by Van Hughes) comes running to see Starr and Hope, and though James warns Starr that hiding Cole is dangerous, she does so anyway, while the past romance is reignited as Hannah O'Connor comes after them, still hellbent on Cole being with her. In the ensuing chaos Cole takes a bullet for Starr.

Jessica attempts to trade herself for Natalie, but Ford intervenes and a chandelier falls on top of him. John tried to fend off Mitch, but after Mitch nearly kills John, Natalie shoots him fatally and Mitch is killed at long last. Allison Perkins then confronts Viki and Clint at Llanfair where she reveals she orchestrated the entire breakout and is no longer under Mitch's spell. She reveals that Jessica is actually Clint's daughter and that she lied to Mitch all those years ago and altered the DNA test done back in 2001. However, she still shoots Viki in cold blood and as Clint tries to call 911, he suffers another heart attack. While Viki awakens in heaven, Clint awakens in hell. Cole too awakens in heaven and is greeted by Luna Moody, who encourages him to fight for his life. While the doctors give up on Cole, Starr declares she still loves him, which causes James to end their romance (even though James believes Cole to be dead). Ford awakens in hell and despite his changed ways and pleas to live, he dies of his injuries. Viki is greeted by her daughter Megan and Clint is greeted by Stacy Morasco whose heart he now has. While Stacy condemns Clint to hell, and Megan encourages her mother to rest and cross over into heaven, Clint escapes Stacy's clutches and races to find Viki where he declares his undying love. The two choose to give life another chance and are revived by paramedics.

In the finale, Allison Perkins is reading a script she wrote about the people of Llanview. Over the course of the episode, it becomes clear that she is reading the script to another person, who does not respond to Allison (it is implied that the person is probably being held captive by Allison). A new DNA test proves Jessica is biologically Clint's daughter. Rex, Gigi, and Shane move to London. Natalie and John resume their romance. Starr and Hope go to California (for Starr to pursue her music career) where they re-connect with Markko and Langston. Blair and Todd continue to grow closer since New Year's Eve, now bonding over missing Starr. They agree to trust one another, and they have sex for the first time in years. Langston and Markko are grieving over Cole's reported death; Starr reveals to them that Cole survived and that Todd (because Cole had taken a bullet for Starr) helped Cole reunite with Marty and Patrick (who is revealed to be alive and living in hiding somewhere). An associate of Todd's shows up at the L.A. apartment to introduce Starr to her new bodyguard: it turns out to be Cole. Cole and Starr reunite.

Jessica is visited by Brody and he apologizes for his actions and reveals he is reenlisting with the SEALS. It is hinted that the pair will eventually reconcile as a spark of their old love surfaces. Destiny gives birth to her and Matthew's son at home, with her parents, Bo, and Nora in attendance. Mathew realizes he wants to be with her and their child, so he arrives to talk with her only to find that she is in labor. He reconciles with Destiny moments before the birth. They name the baby Drew, after Bo's dead son and Mathew's brother. New grandparents Bo and Nora declare their love for each other one more time in a touching scene.

In the final moments: After sorting through their emotions, Clint again declares how Viki has always been the one. He drops to his knee and asks her to marry him for a third time. While Tea and Tomas Delgado wait at John McBain's apartment, John bursts into Blair's bedroom with Llanview Police backup, interrupting Todd and Blair lying blissfully in bed. John announces to Todd that he's under arrest for the murder of Victor Lord, Jr. In the final scene, it is revealed that the person to whom Allison Perkins is reading her script titled "One Life To Live" is none other than Victor Lord Jr. who is alive and tied up to a bed in her hotel room.

=== 2013 ===
One Life to Live returned as Prospect Park's online revival of the hit soap series on April 29, 2013. Brand new exciting stories were crafted for Llanview including Victor Lord Jr's. return, and a mysterious tattoo organization cult that involved Jeffrey King (Corbin Bleu), a freelance reporter and internet blogger for The Banner, and Allison Perkins' wealthy businessman brother Carl Peterson (Ron Raines) that was after both Victor Jr., Todd, and their families. Other storylines included Danielle's shocking turn to drugs, Dorian's political scandal, and Natalie moving on from John McBain with her new boyfriend, former con artist turned nightclub manager and club promoter of Llanview's new nightclub Shelter Cutter, and the reunion of Todd and Blair. OLTL ended its first season on August 19, 2013, but Prospect Park shelved the show indefinitely along with All My Children a month later due to a lawsuit that Prospect Park filed against ABC.
