= One Life to Live storylines (1968–1979) =

Storylines of American soap opera

One Life to Live is an American soap opera that was broadcast from 1968 to 2013, on the ABC network from 1968 to 2012. The series starts with One Life to Live storylines (1968–1979). The plot continues in One Life to Live storylines (1980–1989). The plot in the next decade is outlined in One Life to Live storylines (1990–1999) and the story concludes in One Life to Live storylines (2000—2013).

== 1968–1978 ==
The earliest storylines of One Life to Live focused on the blue collar, Polish Catholic Wolek family, and the super-rich Lords. Additionally, there was also the Rileys, although most of the latter were featured much less prominently. One Life to Live is also noteworthy for including a Black family, the Grays, from the show's earliest episodes.

=== Sadie and Carla ===
"A woman came to town with a mystery. Everybody knew she was important, because she was on almost every day of the week. So they knew that she was going to be some kind of major story but they couldn't figure out what she was gonna be, because she wasn't the usual blonde, blue-eyed leading female. She looked very...exotic. And she had this exotic name, Carla Benari."

— Ellen Holly on the beginnings of her One Life to Live character, Television Academy Foundation

One of the show's earliest and most controversial storylines was the one that played out between housekeeping director at Llanview Hospital, Sadie Gray (Lillian Hayman), and Carla Benari (Ellen Holly), an actress who arrived in Llanview and became a patient of Dr. Jim Craig's (Robert Milli) at the hospital. Assumed to be Italian American, Carla Benari is an important character immediately upon her arrival, becoming involved in a love triangle between Dr. Craig and internist Price Trainor (Peter DeAnda). Carla also strikes up a friendship with Anna Wolek (Doris Belack), unaware that Sadie is Anna's neighbor and best friend which would become relevant as the storyline progressed on-screen. At this point in the storyline, one ABC affiliate in Texas briefly dropped One Life to Live from its schedule due to the storyline in which Price Trainor, a black man, kissed Carla Benari, who was believed to be white.

The character of Carla, despite debuting in episode 61, months after the show's July 1968 premiere, was conceptualized in Agnes Nixon's original show Bible, and as such is considered part of the story of Llanview from the beginning. Nixon has said she was inspired to create the Carla Gray character after seeing singer Eartha Kitt in a television interview. Kitt expressed her own frustration at facing prejudice from both white and black audiences because of her light-skinned complexion, and the feeling of not belonging to either group. (Even Carla's surname "Gray" reflects the in-between nature of the character, not "black" or "white".) According to actress Ellen Holly's memoir, One Life: An Autobiography of an African American Actress, Nixon based Carla's mother Sadie on a maid who worked for Nixon's family when she was growing up much the same way that Sadie on One Life initially worked as a maid for the Lord family. Nixon based Carla and Sadie's original story on the film Imitation of Life, in which a light-skinned Black woman denies her heritage and her darker-complected mother, and enters white society by passing.

The revelation that Carla Benari was actually Black did not come until Ellen Holly had appeared in the role on-screen for five months. It was to be revealed that Carla Benari was actually "Clara Gray", who was mentioned from the earliest episodes by Sadie as the daughter who was "lost to her". Anna Wolek and her family, and by extension the audience, assumed Clara was dead. Holly spoke about the historic episodes in a 2018 Television Academy Foundation interview:

[In] the fifth month in which everybody's invested all their energy in learning about these people for these five months, that day, on a Friday — deliberately chosen for Friday — the cameras started following a whole bunch of people during their daily [routines], including Carla and Sadie...And at the end of the day, five minutes before that, Sadie and Carla Benari meet in front of Anna Wolek's door. [Sadie's] visiting her neighbor. [Carla's] going there for some other reason. They stand there and they look at each other and Sadie looks at me and says, "Clara!" And I say, "Mama!" Cut to black! Well, everybody got on the phone that week: "Did you see that on Friday? Clara, that dead girl, that was supposed to...?" ...The world checked in on Monday to get the backstory. The backstory was that she was an actress and she wanted to be a big star and she went to the bright lights of the big city and found out nobody could give a damn, and also it wasn't helpful to be black, so she started passing for white, and that didn't do too well either, and she ended up on some lousy bus-and-truck tour that had come back to town.

— Ellen Holly

Carla chooses to live as "Carla Benari" for a little while longer, eventually becoming engaged to Dr. Craig, who was willing to keep her secret should she continue to want to live as "Carla Benari". The storyline eventually ended with Carla calling off her engagement and informing everyone in Llanview of her true identity, including to Price Trainor, who is furious. He tries to give Carla another chance, but it does not work out and he accepts a job offer overseas. While originally very heartbroken by Carla's rejection, Sadie regains a close and loving relationship with her daughter, who apologizes for her hurtful actions. While changing her surname back to "Gray", she decides to keep the forename "Carla". Ratings shot up for the then-fledgling soap, and as it was the first daytime soap opera to feature a Black woman, namely Ellen Holly, in a leading role, One Life to Live began to score high ratings in the African American demographic.

=== Larry/Merrie in love ===
Young intern Dr. Larry Wolek (Paul Tulley, Jim Storm, from 1969 onward Michael Storm) falls in love with Meredith Lord (Trish Van Devere, Lynn Benesch) the younger of two daughters of Victor Lord (Ernest Graves, Shepperd Strudwick). They initially met when Larry helped treat Merrie's heart condition. Victor disapproved of Larry as a suitor for his daughter and forbade her seeing him. Frustrated, Larry turned to Karen Martin (Niki Flacks), a nurse who saved his life when he was trapped in a fire. Larry wed Karen, but realized soon afterward it was a mistake; he didn't love her. He did stay with her when he found out she was pregnant however. Meanwhile, a heart-broken Merrie became involved with Tom Edwards (Joseph Gallison), a young man whom she found wandering in the park with amnesia and who was more to Victor's liking. Karen miscarried her baby and agreed to a divorce. Larry wanted to court Merrie again, but she had already accepted Tom's proposal. Ultimately though, Merrie chose to wed Larry. Merrie went through her own extremely difficult pregnancy, but successfully delivered twins, a son Danny (who would eventually grow up to be a doctor as well) and a daughter who died at birth. She suffered from post-partum depression. She was also held hostage by two escaped convicts for a prolonged period. Tragically, she died of a brain aneurysm in 1973, leaving Larry crushed.

=== "Niki Smith" ===
Merrie's sister Victoria Lord (originated by Gillian Spencer, from 1971 onward Erika Slezak) was a sexually repressed young woman who lived for her father's approval. When brash reporter Joe Riley (Lee Patterson) began to chip away at her defenses, the fun-loving blonde-wigged "Niki Smith" began showing up at local bars. Joe's best friend, truck-driver (and later police officer) Vinny Wolek (Antony Ponzini, Jordan Charney, Michael Ingram), fell in love with Niki. When he realized she was really a split-personality (or 'alter') of Viki, he told Joe the truth. Viki underwent psychoanalysis with Dr. Polk, and her split-personality seemed at the time to be cured. She married Joe soon afterward. A few years later, Joe was presumed dead. Viki married reporter Steve Burke (Bernard Grant), who at the time was being stalked by the psychopathic Marcy Wade (Francesca James). Steve went on trial for her murder, and was ultimately cleared by none other than Joe himself, who had survived his presumably fatal car crash, but had been amnesiac for over a year. Poor Viki suddenly found herself with two husbands, and had a difficult time deciding on which husband to stay married. Viki and Joe reunited, but not before he had a child with Cathy Craig (Dorrie Kavanaugh). When the child died, Cathy kidnapped Viki and Joe's baby, Kevin Riley, in 1977.

=== Anti-drugs ===
The show also had a sustained anti-drug storyline centering on wild child Cathy Craig (Catherine Burns, Amy Levitt, Jane Alice Brandon, Dorrie Kavanaugh, Jennifer Harmon). Cathy was the only daughter of widower Dr. Jim Craig (Robert Milli, Nat Polen). She resented her father's second marriage to Anna Wolek (Doris Belack, Kathleen Maguire, Phyllis Behar). Cathy rebelled by taking drugs, and spiralled into addiction. While on a bad acid trip, she murdered her drug dealer Artie Duncan (John Cullum), but blocked the incident out of her memory. Vinnie was wrongly accused and sentenced for the crime. Cathy finally recalled her actions and confessed. Rather than go to jail, she was sent to Odyssey House, a real-life NYC treatment center for drug-addicted youths. In an unusual move, Cathy's portrayer, actress Amy Levitt, was videotaped while sitting in on real-life therapy sessions at Odyssey House, which were then broadcast as OLTL episodes during the summer of 1970.

=== Dorian Cramer ===
Dr. Dorian Cramer (Nancy Pinkerton, on-and-off from 1979 Robin Strasser) arrived in Llanview in April 1973 with her sister, Melinda (Patricia Pearcy); the following year she and her married lover Dr. Mark Toland (Tommy Lee Jones) conspired to cover up their complicity in the death of patient, Rachel Wilson (Nancy Barrett). When the truth came out, Dorian was suspended from Llanview hospital; erroneously believing Viki was partly responsible, Dorian vowed revenge. After becoming the private physician to Viki's ailing father Victor, she married him, and schemed to control his fortune. Dorian's machinations further fueled the enmity between Viki and herself. After Victor's mysterious death in 1976, the shadow of suspicion surrounded Dorian for decades.

=== Decline and resurgence ===
As social issue-oriented stories on matters such as race and drug addiction played themselves out, ratings fell; in response, in 1975 ABC hired high-priced Another World actors George Reinholt and Jacqueline Courtney to portray Tony Lord and Pat Ashley. The numbers rose, but the pairing never achieved the success expected by executives. Reinholt left after only two years and replaced by Philip MacHale and, later, Chip Lucia; Courtney was fired in 1983.

The show did have huge success in the middle and late 1970s with new character-siblings Jenny (Katherine Glass, Brynn Thayer) and Karen Wolek (Kathryn Breech, Julia Duffy, Judith Light), distant cousins of the original Wolek family. Jenny was a novitiate nun who left the convent after falling in love with Tim Siegel (Tom Berenger). Her cousin Vinnie was angry, and accused Tim of 'stealing Jenny from the church.' Vinnie & Tim got into a physical fight, one that left Tim with grave head injuries from which he died soon afterwards. Jenny married Tim on his deathbed. Later, Jenny married bad boy Brad Vernon (Steve Fletcher, Jameson Parker), a philandering Lothario who caused her no small amount of grief.

Karen seduced Larry into marrying her, a controversial move in itself given that they were related (albeit several familial relations removed). But Karen, bored with married life and suffering overwhelming self-esteem problems, began turning tricks in the daytime with rich suitors in exchange for expensive 'gifts.' The sleazy opportunist Marco Dane (Gerald Anthony) discovered Karen's trysts and blackmailed her into becoming a housewife hooker, turning tricks for his clientele while Larry was at work. Karen was overwhelmed with guilt, and finally confessed to Viki her secret life. Viki helped Karen escape Marco's control.

Also appearing for the first time in 1978 was Viki's teenage ward Tina Clayton (Andrea Evans), introduced as the orphaned daughter of Viki's college friend Irene Manning Clayton (Kate McKeown) who asked Viki to be Tina's guardian before she died. Red-headed, free-spirited Tina seemed quite a lot like Viki's alter-ego Niki Smith, and was almost as troublesome. Nevertheless, Viki did her best to be a good mother figure to Tina. It would be years later that the two women learned how close their bond really was.

== 1979: Murder of Marco Dane ==
A Grand Jury indicted Viki for the murder of Marco Dane. Karen Wolek searched for her hooker friend, Katrina Karr (Nancy Snyder), because she believed Katrina knew who killed Marco. Karen confided this to her client Talbot Huddleston (Byron Sanders), who was concerned Katrina may have seen him kill Marco. D.A. Herb Callison (Anthony Call) dropped the biggest bombshell of all by calling a surprise witness; Marco Dane's twin brother, Dr. Mario Corelli (also played by Gerald Anthony). Mario introduced damaging letters Marco had written to him about how Viki had threatened him.

Viki's trial reached a thrilling climax when Karen took the stand for the defense. Karen had finally found Katrina. In exchange for money she needed for drugs, Katrina gave Karen the combination to a Post Office box, which Katrina claimed contained information revealing the identity of Marco Dane's killer. When Karen went to the Post Office to get the information, she discovered to her horror the killer had beaten her to it. Also, Katrina had been run down by a car and was now lying comatose in Llanview hospital. Karen correctly guessed Talbot was the killer and prepared to break the news in court. As Karen took the stand, she was savagely cross-examined by Herb, who forced her to reveal her secret life as a hooker. Larry listened in stunned silence as his wife revealed she had been turning tricks when he thought she was tending to their home. Katrina later came out of her coma and named Talbot as the killer. This was enough to exonerate Viki, but Karen's marriage to Larry appeared to be doomed.

Dorian led a vicious campaign to have Larry ousted as Chief of Staff of Llanview Hospital. Dorian ordained her old friend and mentor, Dr. Ivan Kipling (Jack Betts), as Larry's replacement; A move the ambitious and cutthroat Dr. Kipling strongly favored. Larry offered to make another go of his marriage. Karen realized she'd always be Larry's albatross, and decided to divorce him.

Dr. Mario Corelli settled in Llanview. In time, Karen discovered an amazing truth. Mario was really Marco Dane. He wasn't dead after all. Karen forced Marco to tell what really happened the night he was supposedly murdered. Marco was horrified to discover the dead body of his brother Mario, and made the instant decision to exchange identities with the corpse. Marco implored Karen to keep his secret, telling her he'd been "born again." Karen agreed on one condition. He had to stop practicing medicine. Marco agreed.

=== Gambling debts ===
Jenny was delighted to be pregnant with Brad's baby. Brad had developed a compulsion for gambling. With his losses mounting, Brad stole Jenny's key to the hospital's pharmacy. Brad gave the key to a mobster named Brick in exchange for forgiving Brad's gambling debts. When Brick and an accomplice tried to rob the pharmacy, they were caught by Dr. Jack Scott (Arthur Burghardt), who was shot and paralyzed in the violent exchange.

Feeling guilty Brad was home alone without her, Jenny asked Karen to look after him. Karen knew Brad did not like her, but Karen would do whatever Jenny wanted. Brad and Karen clashed at first, but eventually Brad became fascinated by his sexy sister-in-law. The fascination grew into obsession. One night, Brad tried to seduce his sister-in-law, but the seduction turned to rape. Karen knew she couldn't reveal a word about the rape because if Jenny were to find out, it would all but destroy her. Larry began his own detective work and realized Brad raped Karen. In a rage, Larry beat Brad to a pulp. Jenny threw Brad out of their apartment. He pleaded guilty to a lesser charge, and was sentenced to three months in prison.

Jenny gave premature birth to her tiny baby about the same time Katrina gave birth to her own healthy baby. When Karen and Marco were visiting the hospital, Jenny's baby went into cardiac arrest and died before their eyes. In a panic, Karen and Marco switched Jenny's baby with Katrina's baby. Katrina fell into a deep depression when she was told her baby died. Jenny took baby Mary home, never suspecting the precious little girl belonged to another woman.

When Pat discovered her new husband Adam Brewster (John Mansfield) had put all moral considerations aside in order to get his financial empire back in order, she quickly had their new marriage annulled. For comfort, Pat turned to her TV producer, Dick Grant (A.C. Weary). In Pat's presence, Dick was a cheerful, charming, very outgoing gentleman. However, unbeknownst to Pat, Dick had developed a psychotic crush on her. When Samantha discovered Dick had turned his apartment into a photo-covered shrine to Pat, he kidnapped her, and then Pat, before the police apprehended him.

Viki received some joyous news when she discovered she was pregnant with her second child. Joe began suffering all the classic signs of a recurrence of his brain tumor. When Joe learned he had only a few weeks left, he treated Viki to a wonderful wedding anniversary. With time running out, Joe hand-picked his successor as editor of The Banner. He sent for the editor of a small but prestigious newspaper in Arizona. The man's name was Clint Buchanan (Clint Ritchie). Joe broke the news of his prognosis to Viki, shortly before succumbing to his illness. He beseeched Viki to move on with her life after he was gone. Viki poured her energies into working with Clint at The Banner, and fending off a takeover attempt by her arch-rival, Dorian Lord.
