= One Life to Live storylines (1990–1999) =

Storylines of American soap opera

One Life to Live is an American soap opera that was broadcast on the ABC network from 1968 to 2012. The series began with One Life to Live storylines (1968–1979). The plot continues in One Life to Live storylines (1980–1989). The plot in the next decade is outlined in One Life to Live storylines (1990–1999) and the story concludes in One Life to Live Storylines (2000–2013).

== 1990 to 1992 ==
=== Lord love the children ===
After discovering that the charity group Tina began working for in late 1989 is really an illegal adoption ring headed by Serena and Ambrose Wyman, Tina, Viki, Roger and Cord team up to take them down. They are helped by Max and Gabrielle who become involved when their son Al is kidnapped to be sold. Ambrose lures them to an old factory on New Year's Eve 1989 where hidden fireworks are set to explode and kill them. Clint rescues them but the Wymans escape after shooting Max. While everyone else is at the hospital, Tina tracks down the Wymans on their yacht and pulls a gun on them. They then gain the advantage and hold her hostage. Clint and Cord rescue her before she is killed and the Wymans are arrested. Soon after, she fails to break up Cord and Debra's relationship, Tina then bids farewell to Llanview and leaves with her son CJ.

=== Mendorra ===
The final adventures of the Rauch-era feature political intrigue in the fictional country of Mendorra, which has been wreaking havoc on Llanview citizens for years. The royal battle between brothers Prince Raymond and Roland Hohenstein come to head with Sarah and Megan being captured and held prisoner in Mendorra by the evil Prince Roland after traveling there to help Prince Raymond who went blind while rescuing Megan from a fire. Roland hatches an evil plot in which Sarah is to marry Raymond so he can assume the throne. Bo, Cord, Dorian, Cassie and Debra team up to save them and in the conclusion, Bo poses as Raymond and marries Sarah in the cathedral. After the royal wedding, Sarah, Bo, Megan and Raymond escape on skis still dressed in their wedding attire and ski down a mountain with Roland in pursuit (on location in Austria). Then Roland and Raymond battle to the death with good defeating evil and Raymond winning back the throne.

=== Michael Grande and drug cartels ===
As the new decade begins, Viki runs for mayor of Llanview on a strong anti-drug platform. Roger Gordon manages her campaign, and the two fight their mutual feelings for each other. Meanwhile, Gabrielle's mother Julia Medina (Linda Thorson), who is every bit the schemer her daughter is, sets her sights on snaring Clint. Making things even more complicated is Viki’s opponent, Herb Callison, whose campaign is managed by newly returned Dorian (now played by Elaine Princi). Viki wins, and becomes a target of the local drug cartel, whose mastermind is Michael Grande.

Michael has alienated virtually everybody in Llanview. When he is gunned down, there is no shortage of suspects. But Megan is arrested, tried and found guilty of the crime. Jake Harrison (Joe Lando), new love in her life, busts her out of jail. Megan is saved from a life-without-parole sentence when her father Roger confesses to killing Michael in self-defense. (He would have confessed sooner, but he had been in a coma.)

Michael’s drug-trafficking business is taken over by Carlo Hesser (Thom Christopher), one of the most durable villains in the series' history. Like Michael before him, Carlo becomes a bitter enemy of everybody in town, is gunned down and there is a major murder investigation that lasts for months. This happens not once, but twice—in 1992 and 1997.

=== Badderly Island ===
After all the trauma they endured in early 1990, Sarah and Bo decided to honeymoon in July and chose the remote island of Badderly as the place to go. They decided to bring the cast and crew of Fraternity Row along for a location shoot. So Sarah, Bo, Megan, Cord, Spring Skye and company travel to Badderly, but the situation turns dangerous as the gang realize that the island is infested by mobsters. Carlo's son Johnny Dee, his sister Charlotte, Tina who is involved with Johnny join an undercover Marco Dane up to another one of his schemes. Marco falls for Megan again and tries to help the gang escape; they all go undercover, Sarah as a country woman, Megan as a bookworm and Bo as a mobster. Jake and Lucky then travel to Badderly after learning about the island and Jake has to pretend he likes Charlotte so their cover is not blown. Then Marco and Megan try to escape on a raft but it capsizes and Marco has to save Megan from drowning. Then Sarah and Megan walk in the jungle and Sarah finds herself trapped in a pit of quicksand. Megan is forced to leave her and get Bo and Jake who rescue her. Then the gang discovers the drug lab on the island as their cover is blown. Bo is forced to shoot Jake who actually recovers. Then they are held hostage and survive an explosion before defeating the mob. All of the couples happily reunite. They then race back to Llanview to try to save Viki who the Hessers plan to assassinate.

One of Carlo’s early heinous acts is to attempt to have Viki assassinated. He fails but does cause her to have a stroke, leaving her an invalid for many months. Unknown to anyone, Viki begins having hallucinatory visits from her alter Niki. Meanwhile, Carlo’s son Johnny Dee Hesser is stalking Tina (now played by Karen Witter) and insists that the baby she is carrying is his, not Cord’s. One night, Johnny Dee breaks into Llanfair and attempts to kidnap Tina. Viki turns into Niki (who was not affected by Viki’s stroke-induced paralysis), shoots Johnny, and reverts to Viki. Since Tina is unconscious, nobody saw "Niki", and hence everyone assumes that Viki could not possibly shoot him. Months later, Carlo learns the truth and attempts to get even by killing Megan. Gabrielle is ordered by Carlo to drug Viki, which is a part of his diabolical scheme to turn Viki into Niki, and get her to kill her own daughter, Megan. Gabrielle can not go through with Carlo's plan and is later sentenced to fifteen years in Statesville Prison (taking the fall for Carlo, who threatened her son's life).

Bo marries Megan’s sister Sarah, but she is kidnapped and believed killed by Carlo Hesser’s henchmen to keep her from testifying against him. While searching for Sarah, Bo is assisted by FBI agent Alex Olanov (Tonja Walker) who later turns out to be mentally unbalanced, and develops an obsessive fixation on Bo. When Bo begins dating Dorian's daughter Cassie (Laura Koffman), Alex flips out and tries to kill her. Later, immediately after Bo and Cassie are married at Llanfair, Alex shows up with a huge surprise—Sarah, alive and well. Bo leaves Cassie to reconcile with Sarah, but she actually dies from injuries caused by a car accident in November 1993.

== 1992 to 1996 ==
The mid-1990s are considered by some fans to be something of a golden age for OLTL, in part thanks to head writer Michael Malone, who introduced some popular new characters and introduced some surprisingly novel storylines.

=== Megan's death ===
Jake and Megan are wed, but almost as soon as they tie the knot, Jake (a P.I.) leaves on an investigation in the middle-eastern country Jaba. Jake disappears, and Megan is left not knowing whether he is alive or dead. Worse yet, Megan begins suffering from lupus. Despondent over losing Jake, she ignores her health and parties heavily, taxing her system to the limit. A desperate kidney transplant (Viki was the donor) fails to save her. Reverend Andrew Carpenter (Robert Krimmer) harbors a crush on Megan, and risks his life going to Jaba to rescue Jake just in time for husband and wife to have one last moment together. Megan dies in Jake’s arms.

Cord is reportedly "killed" in Jaba as well, although he turns up a year later. In the interim, Tina takes up with con man Cain Rogan (Christopher Cousins).

Carlo is believed murdered, and a lengthy police investigation ensues. One of the chief suspects is Alex Olanov, who has blackmailed Carlo into marrying her (and then entertained him with kinky bondage games). While the former FBI agent is not Carlo’s killer, she does take over his criminal empire for a time—reluctantly aided by Mortimer Bern who was separated at birth from his twin brother Carlo.

=== New relationships ===
The death of Megan (and supposed death of Cord) sparks a rift between Clint and Viki that grows wider over time. Viki takes an interest in Andrew’s father General Sloane Carpenter (Roy Thinnes), whose personality is disturbingly like that of Viki’s late father Victor. The unthinkable happens when Viki has an affair with Sloane, and finally divorces Clint in order to marry him. Sloane, who suffers from Hodgkin’s disease, is living on borrowed time though. Viki actually marries him while he is in the hospital intensive-care unit, and he dies shortly afterward in 1994.

Dorian shocks Llanview society by brazenly dating Jason Webb (Mark Brettschneider), 21-year-old nephew of Wanda Webb Wolek (Marilyn Chris). Like Dorian, Asa returns to his old ways—he cruelly dumps Renee for the much younger new wife Blair Cramer (Mia Korf). Blair is Dorian’s niece and takes after her aunt by swindling Asa and cheating on him with Max Holden. Blair has her own grudge against Dorian over the treatment of Addie Cramer (Pamela Payton-Wright), Blair’s mentally ill mother and Dorian’s sister.

Max is so smitten with Blair that he barely notices his business partner Luna Moody (Susan Batten), who co-owns the Serenity Springs Spa with him. The wacky, goddess-worshipping, New Age Luna is convinced that she and Max are soul mates—and they are. But before they marry in 1993, Luna had to fight the Specter of Death itself to save Max, and Max faced off with the ghost of Luna’s first husband Johnny; not to mention Alex, who stages a fake haunting of Serenity Springs to drive away business and stage a hostile takeover (she fails). Max later becomes a gambling addict, and Blair (who has broken up with Asa) exploits this weakness to seduce him. But when Luna suffers a near-crippling spinal injury, Max realizes what is important to him and mends his bad-boy ways.

After Blair dumps Asa, he takes up with Carlo’s widow Alex. Asa and Alex are definitely two of a kind—greedy, power-mad and competitive. Alex is also prone to gaudy displays of wealth—such as her wedding to Asa, which she arrives at via a "royal barge" decked out as Cleopatra. She uses Asa’s money and connections to buy social prestige, even running for and winning the election as Llanview’s mayor.

Meanwhile, Viki and Clint’s kids are SORAS-ed from young children to teenagers and young adults. Kevin Buchanan (Kirk Geiger) has a son Duke by LeeAnn Demerest (Yasmine Bleeth) and falls under Asa’s corrupting influence. When LeeAnn breaks up with him to be with Jason Webb, Kevin uses Asa’s connections and money to get a court order declaring LeeAnn an unfit mother, which gives him sole custody of Duke. Jason kidnaps Duke, and LeeAnn goes into hiding with him, but they are eventually found and arrested. Kevin turns over a new leaf though, thanks in large part to the influence of a new love interest—Rachel Gannon (Ellen Bethea), and allows LeeAnn to leave town with Duke.

=== Homophobia ===
Joey’s new best friend Billy Douglas (Ryan Phillippe) comes out of the closet and is at the center of a major town scandal: wild child Marty Saybrooke (Susan Haskell) spreads rumors that Rev. Andrew had sexually molested Billy, and homophobia spreads through Llanview in the summer of 1992. Andrew’s brother is a gay man who died of AIDS, and he fought against the town’s desire to stigmatize gay people. The storyline culminates with the AIDS quilt coming to Llanview. Andrew and Cassie fall in love and are married soon after.

Bo and Sarah are on their way to get remarried when a hit-and-run driver runs them off the road and Sarah is killed. Bo almost has a nervous breakdown trying to track down the man responsible. He is aided in his search by Nora Hanen Gannon (Hillary B. Smith), the ex-wife of district attorney Hank Gannon (Nathan Purdee) and mother of his daughter Rachel. Nora, a lawyer herself, begins experiencing blackouts and headaches from a brain tumor. For a time, she mistakenly believes that she herself was the hit-and-run driver who ran Bo’s car off the road (she had blacked out that night due to stress from the tumor.) Bo and Nora fall in love, and the two "rockin' oldies" fans are eventually married by none other than Little Richard (who is an ordained minister in real life).

=== Marty's rape ===
Several people, including Andrew and Viki, try to befriend the very troubled Marty. She adamantly resists help and creates trouble for everyone who reaches out to her. In time, she mellows. But her trouble-making history comes back to haunt her in a big way in May 1993. After getting drunk at a college fraternity party, she is gang-raped by Todd Manning (Roger Howarth) and his two fellow frat brothers, Zach Rosen (Josh Philip Weinstein) and Powell Lord III (Sean Moynihan), Kevin Buchanan's cousin. Because of her intoxication, Marty mistakenly believes that Kevin (Kirk Geiger) is one of her attackers, even though he's not. When Marty presses charges against her attackers (and Kevin), the entire town is polarized, with many people believing this is another of her mean-spirited lies. Marty eventually realizes that Kevin is not one of her attackers, and retracts the charges against him, even though it hurts her case. Todd, Zach and Powell are almost cleared of the charges because crucial evidence cannot be located. But their defense attorney, Nora, realizes that her clients are actually guilty, and during her closing argument she loses her cool and rails against them, causing a mistrial.

Todd is eventually sentenced to prison, but fools a naïve Christian missionary girl, Rebecca Lewis (Reiko Aylesworth), into thinking he's changed. With her unwitting help, Todd escapes from jail. While on the lam, Todd gets into a fight with Marty’s boyfriend Suede Pruitt (David Ledingham) that accidentally results in the latter's death. Todd also terrorizes a temporarily blind Nora at her beach house before being apprehended by the new police commissioner, Bo. However, Todd shows he has a good side when he rescues Cord and Tina’s kids, C.J. and Sarah, Jessica Buchanan, and even Marty from a dangerous car crash. Because of this, Todd is given a chance to redeem himself and released on probation—much to the dismay of many Llanview citizens, especially Marty. Marty even circulates a petition to have Todd sent back to prison. He reforms himself somewhat, though he maintains his surly disposition. Surprisingly, he finds a soulmate in Blair, another town pariah who wants a shot at redemption.

=== Dorian ===
Meanwhile, Viki and Dorian’s long feud reignites (Robin Strasser had returned to the role at this point). Viki discovers evidence that supports her long-held belief that Dorian murdered her father, and had her nemesis is brought up on charges. Dorian's lawyer, Nora, finds conflicting evidence from a Lord family butler who says he saw Tina's mother, Irene Clayton, fleeing from Victor’s room just after he died. Nevertheless, Dorian is found guilty and given a death sentence for Victor’s murder. Yet, she is saved by a handsome young man named David Vickers (Tuc Watkins) who claimed to witness Irene murder Victor. Even more shocking is his claim that he is Irene and Victor's son.

Dorian, free from jail, seeks revenge in an unusual way—she seduces Viki’s son Joey (SORAS-ed yet again and played by Nathan Fillion). Dorian manipulates the boy into falling in love with her, and then lures Viki to her house to find them (on her scheduled wedding day to Sloane). But once again, Dorian’s revenge scenario backfires on her—she genuinely falls in love with Joey. Later, when Joey transfers his affections to Dorians niece Kelly Cramer (Gina Tognoni), she takes it quite hard.

=== Victor's son ===
David is not Victor's son—he is a con man who has learned of the existence of the son and tries to pass himself off to steal a trust fund. David’s scheme unravels when he falls for Tina, who is supposed to be his sister. He entrusts her with his secret, but she can not keep it. Eventually, Cord finds out and exposes them both.

The true identity of Victor's missing son is a huge shock—it is Todd. Todd is one of the last people to know the truth; even Blair discovers the secret first. Once she knows, Blair makes certain to sink her claws into Todd (a potential millionaire) before he asserts his birthright—she claims she is pregnant and cajoled him into marrying her. Later, after learning the truth and obtaining his inheritance, Todd suspects Blair has bamboozled him and demands she take a pregnancy test. Even Blair is surprised when the test comes back positive. She miscarries after being assaulted by muggers.

=== Viki's new alters ===
David’s fraud (and Tina's complicity) is the latest in a string of stressful incidents for Viki—divorcing Clint, Dorian’s seduction of Joey, Sloane’s death—that finally take a toll on her psyche. The final straw is when Viki has an angry confrontation with Dorian, in which Dorian reveals the late Victor’s darkest secret: he is a pedophile who repeatedly raped Viki over the entire course of her childhood. Faced with memories that she has repressed for her adult life, Viki snaps and reverts to her multiple personality disorder (now known as Dissociative identity disorder). But this time, she exhibits a number of new personalities beside Niki. The main new "alter" (alternate identity) is Jean Randolph (a skewed version of Viki's mother, and a control freak), as well as Princess (a frightened little girl), Tommy (a violent young boy) and Tori (the most explicitly vengeful of the alters). Jean imprisons Dorian in Llanfair’s secret room for a while. When she finally lets her go, she forces her to marry David Vickers to keep her away from Joey.

Eventually though, Tori takes control and actively seeks to destroy everything that Victor Lord has ever built. Tori sets Llanfair on fire, hoping it will burn to the ground. But she realizes that Viki’s daughter Jessica is still inside. Viki reasserted herself to rescue Jessie, and after many months of drama involving the alters, undergoes psychotherapy to deal with the reality of her childhood. She remembers the most terrible secret of her life in therapy though; back in 1976, she briefly became Tori and murdered Victor (although years later, it would be revealed that Victor survived the attempt on his life). Viki was found not guilty of murder by reason of temporary insanity, but her life was forever changed.

=== Diversity returns to Llanview ===
Throughout his tenure as head writer, Malone had steadily reintroduced racial and cultural diversity into Llanview—the members of the Gannon family (brothers Hank and RJ, and Hank’s daughter Rachel) are all important characters; Hank’s ex-wife Nora was OLTL’s first major Jewish character since the 1970s; and Billy Douglas was one of the first gay characters in the history of daytime TV. In 1995, Malone introduced the working-class and largely Hispanic Angel Square neighborhood of Llanview, and the Vega family. Angel Square is overrun by gangland drug war violence, and mayor Alex Buchanan wants to raze the whole place to put up an arts center (named in her honor). However, many residents fight hard to save their homes. Carlotta Vega (Patricia Maureci) is introduced as Dorian’s maid, but later owns and operates the Vega Diner. She dates Clint, and later Hank. Carlotta’s younger son Cristian Vega (Yorlin Madera, David Fumero) becomes Jessica’s teenage romance. Cristian’s older brother Antonio Vega (Kamar De Los Reyes) is in jail, although Bo arranges to have him pardoned in exchange for his help ending the gang wars. Antonio fell in love with police officer Andy Harrison (Wendee Pratt). Luna’s brother Dylan Moody (Christopher Douglas) opens a youth-center in Angel Square, in between dates with Marty Saybrooke.

Tragically, Luna is one of the victims of the gang violence—being hit by a stray bullet during a shoot-out. Months later, Cristian designs a new angel statue that is erected in the center square bearing Luna’s likeness.

=== Todd Manning ===
An extremely controversial character, Todd is, however, allowed to mend fences with Marty, form a sibling bond with Viki, and even reconcile and remarry Blair (who is again pregnant by him) before being presumed dead and written out. Meanwhile, Marty finds herself in the middle of a love triangle. She marries Luna Moody's brother Dylan (Christopher Douglas), but her heart truly belongs to Irish poet Patrick Thornhart (Thorsten Kaye). Blair blames Marty for Todd’s supposed death. She gives birth to daughter Starr, then chases after Patrick just to get at Marty.

Writer Malone resigned from his head writer position in early 1996.

== 1996 to 1999 ==
Several actors left the show taking their characters out of Llanview: Nathan Fillion (Joey), Tonja Walker (Alex), Jon Loprieno (Cord), and Stephanie Williams (Sheila) all left the show in 1996. Kamar De Los Reyes and Wendee Pratt, who played popular supercouple Antonio and Andy, left in 1997. Susan Haskell and Thorsten Kaye (Marty and Patrick) also departed that year.

=== Carlo ===
Carlo Hesser is resurrected and becomes a part of every ongoing storyline as the major villain. This is so that Carlo can be killed, and another a major "Who killed Carlo Hesser?" storyline can take place with everybody in town named as a suspect. Eventually, Antonio Vega, who had been working undercover in Carlo's criminal organization, is arrested and tried for the murder.

Still seeking revenge against Viki for the death of his son Johnny, he blackmails her psychiatrist into hypnotizing her. He wants to make her hate her son Kevin enough to shoot him. Carlo also enlists Alex’s help in fleecing Asa. Using the alias "Poseidon", Carlo is emailing Asa about an offshore gambling operation, but it is a scam to swindle him. Meanwhile, Asa pressures Alex to give him a new heir. Not wanting to actually have a child, Alex claims she is pregnant and stuffs a pillow under her shirt to fake a belly. Eventually Asa gets wise and publicly exposes mayor Alex’s dirty dealings, ripping the pillow out of her shirt, before divorcing her. Alex is forced to resign from her office in disgrace. However she gets the last laugh on Asa and his family. When she leaves town, she leaves a videotaped good-bye with personalized insults for all the Buchanan family members, and reveals she is leaving in the company of Carlo, who had inexplicably survived his second murder.

=== Drew ===
Bo’s son Drew Buchanan (Victor Browne) is brought back and has a romance with Kelly after Joey leaves town. Like everyone else at this time, Drew is connected to Carlo. Also, Drew’s mother Becky Lee Abbott (Mary Gordon Murray) returns to town, but acts remarkably different than the character had in the past. Whereas Becky Lee has always been a sweet-natured, aspiring country and western singer, she is now depicted as a small-time grifter.

Days of Our Lives star Crystal Chappell was brought in amid much fanfare to play Maggie Carpenter, Max’s new love interest. It is revealed that the free-spirited, saucy Maggie is a novitiate nun. Maggie eventually leaves the church with the intention of opening a "circus arts" school. Maggie was written out shortly after that.

=== Marty, Patrick, Blair, and Todd ===
Marty and Patrick narrowly survive Irish assassins, mad bombers, Carlo's schemes, and Blair. Blair blames Marty for Todd's "death" and seeks to steal Patrick from her. Blair succeeds in seducing Patrick, and being impregnated just before Todd returns from the dead. While Blair's new pregnancy was written because actress Kassie DePavia (née Wessley) was pregnant in real life, it left a sticky situation for the characters to resolve.

In 1997, new head writer Claire Labine "solved" the problem by having Blair's cousin Kelly crash into Blair and Patrick's car. Blair's unborn baby dies, and she lashes out at Todd before going into a coma. Desperate to keep custody of their other child Starr, Todd marries Tea Delgado (Florencia Lozano), his lawyer, but a woman he barely knows, to make a fake family life. Tea represents him in the custody battle. Todd also gets a parrot, and talks to the parrot about his life in a number of scenes.

Other stories at the time involved Marty and Patrick's wedding ending in a hail of gunfire and blood, Dorian's struggles to hide her dark family past, Nora struggling with peri-menopause, and RJ Gannon opening a new bar with a transvestite mixologist.

=== The Phelps era ===
In early 1998 ABC hired Jill Farren Phelps as executive producer and Pam Long as head writer. The first few months of their tenure (featuring a mystery over who killed Nora's crazy assistant Georgie—the killer was Nora’s daughter Rachel)—were well received. However, popular characters were killed (such as Dorian's husband Mel and Bo's son Drew) or written out (such as Dorian's daughter Cassie). Many longtime characters like Nora, Jessica, and Viki were given stories which revolved around the new Rappaport/Davidson family.

Linda Dano was added to the cast in late 1999, after the cancellation of Another World. Dano had played a supporting role on OLTL twenty years earlier, Gretel Cummings. The character, renamed Rae Cummings, returns to Llanview. Dano appears as Rae on all four of ABC's soaps at the time—General Hospital, All My Children and Port Charles in an attempt to promote all four shows to viewers of the individual shows. Similarly, actress Robin Christopher resurrected her AMC character Skye Chandler as a OLTL vixen, before taking the same character to GH.

Phelps hired many actors she had previously worked with to play Llanview characters—Mark Derwin, Kale Browne, John Bolger, Timothy Gibbs. Moments like Todd punching Tea in the face and Nora sleeping with her former lover Sam to give her sterile husband a child provided some powerful drama, but to many viewers, came at the expense of character integrity. Beloved couple Nora and Bo split bitterly.

=== Jessica ===
Meanwhile, beloved teen heroine Jessica (Erin Torpey), who had worried about whether or not she wanted to sleep with boyfriend Cristian, loses her virginity during a drunken night with stepbrother Will Rappaport. She becomes pregnant, but when Dorian runs her down as she is about to give birth, the baby dies. Jessica, in an altered state of mind, begins stalking Dorian. Soon she goes on the run to Ireland with Cristian and fugitive Will, singing in a rock and roll band.

In early 1999, Long was fired, and Phelps (with some help from Harding Lemay) was essentially head writer for most of 1999. Eventually Megan McTavish took over writing chores and created a series of dark storylines involving mobsters, the search for Asa's real son, and tortured love triangles (Kevin/Kelly/Joey; Blair/Max/Skye). Max fakes being Asa's son, develops a brain tumor, strings both ladies along, and is then shot in the back by Blair.
