= Kerwa Dam =

Dam in Mendora, Bhopal, India

- Location within Madhya Pradesh
- Country: India
- Location: Mendora, Bhopal
- Coordinates: 23.174235°N 77.365169°E

Kerwa Dam is located in Mendora village of Bhopal district in Madhya Pradesh, India.

It is located near Bhopal, the capital city of Madhya Pradesh, and is an important source of water for the city. The area around the dam is a popular picnic spot, and attracts several tourists from Bhopal.
