= Mendora, Bhopal =

Mendora
- village
- Location within Madhya Pradesh Location within India
- Coordinates: 23.174307°N 77.369663°E
- Country: India
- State: Madhya Pradesh
- District: Bhopal
- Tehsil: Huzur

Population (2011)
  - Total: 899
- Time zone: UTC+5:30 (IST)
- ISO 3166 code: MP-IN
- Census code: 482544

Mendora is a village in the Bhopal district of Madhya Pradesh, India. It is located in the Huzur tehsil and the Phanda block. The Kerwa Dam is located here.

== Demographics ==
According to the 2011 census of India, Mendora has 210 households. The effective literacy rate (i.e. the literacy rate of population excluding children aged 6 and below) is 81.32%.

Demographics (2011 Census)
	Total	Male	Female
Population	899	475	424
Children aged below 6 years	139	82	57
Scheduled caste	153	78	75
Scheduled tribe	202	104	98
Literates	618	345	273
Workers (all)	288	223	65
Main workers (total)	264	211	53
Main workers: Cultivators	5	5	0
Main workers: Agricultural labourers	4	3	1
Main workers: Household industry workers	6	6	0
Main workers: Other	249	197	52
Marginal workers (total)	24	12	12
Marginal workers: Cultivators	0	0	0
Marginal workers: Agricultural labourers	1	0	1
Marginal workers: Household industry workers	3	1	2
Marginal workers: Others	20	11	9
Non-workers	611	252	359
