= Daytime Emmy Award for Outstanding Supporting Actor in a Drama Series =

Award

- Awarded for: Outstanding Supporting Performance in a Drama Series: Actor
- Country: United States
- Presented by: NATAS; ATAS
- First award: 1979
- Currently held by: Roger Howarth, The Young and the Restless (2026)

Highlights
- Most awards: Justin Deas, (4)
- Most nominations: Justin Deas, (7); Jerry verDorn, (7)
- Website: theemmys.tv/daytime/

The Daytime Emmy Award for Outstanding Supporting Actor in a Drama Series is an award presented annually by the National Academy of Television Arts and Sciences (NATAS) and Academy of Television Arts & Sciences (ATAS). It is given to honor an actor who has delivered an outstanding performance in a supporting role while working within the daytime drama industry.

At the 6th Daytime Emmy Awards held in 1979, Peter Hansen was the first winner of this award for his portrayal of Lee Baldwin on General Hospital. The awards ceremony was not televised in 1983 and 1984, having been criticized for voting integrity. Following the introduction of a new category in 1985, Outstanding Younger Actor in a Drama Series, the criteria for this category was altered, requiring all actors to be aged 26 or above.

Since its inception, the award has been given to 37 actors. General Hospital is the show with the most awarded actors, with a total of twelve wins. In 1983, Darnell Williams became the first African-American to have garnered the award, winning for his role as Jesse Hubbard on All My Children. Since 1994, Justin Deas holds the most wins with a total of four awards for his work on As the World Turns, Santa Barbara and Guiding Light. With seven each, Jerry Ver Dorn had been tied with Deas for the most nominations since 2005. In 2009, Jeff Branson and Vincent Irizarry tied for the award, which was the first tie in this category. As of the 2026 ceremony, Roger Howarth is the most recent winner in this category for his role as Matt Clark on The Young and the Restless.

== Winners and nominees ==
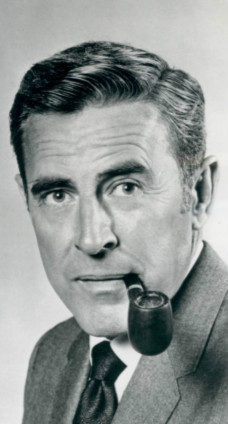
Peter Hansen was the first winner, for his role as Lee Baldwin on General Hospital in 1979.

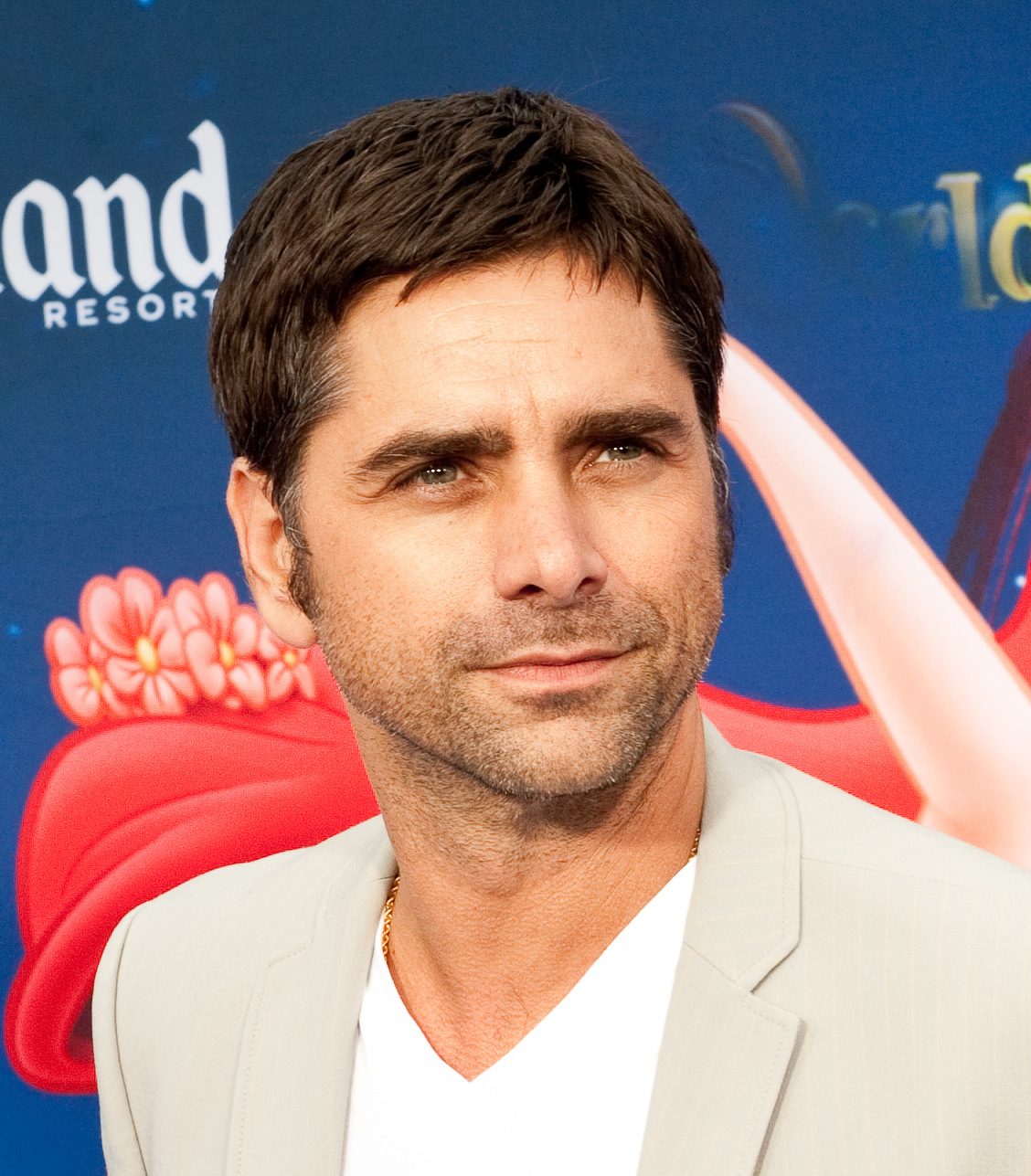
John Stamos was nominated in 1983 for his role as Blackie Parrish on General Hospital.

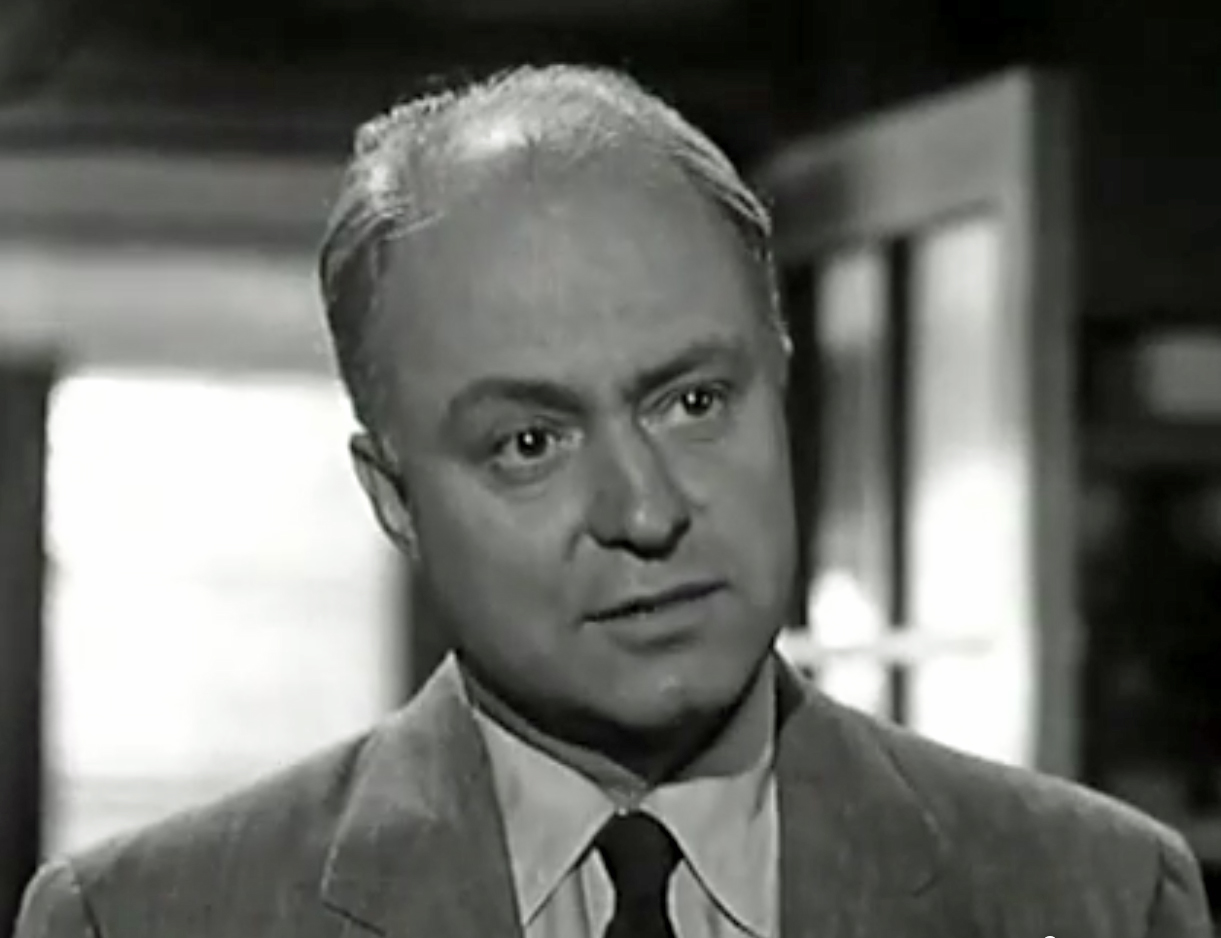
Larry Gates won in 1985 for his role as H.B. Lewis on Guiding Light.

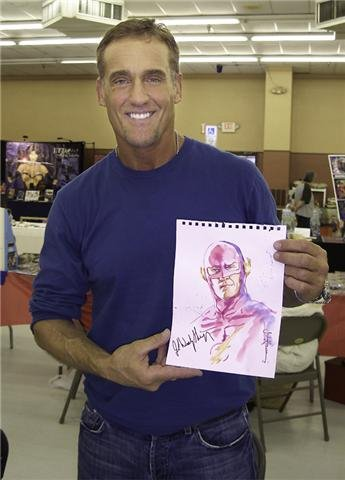
John Wesley Shipp won in 1986 for his role as Doug Cummings on As the World Turns.

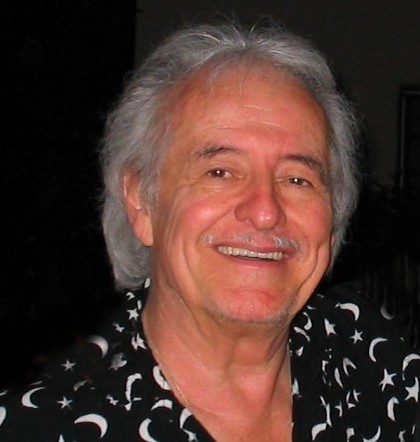
Henry Darrow won in 1990 for his role as Rafael Castillo on Santa Barbara.

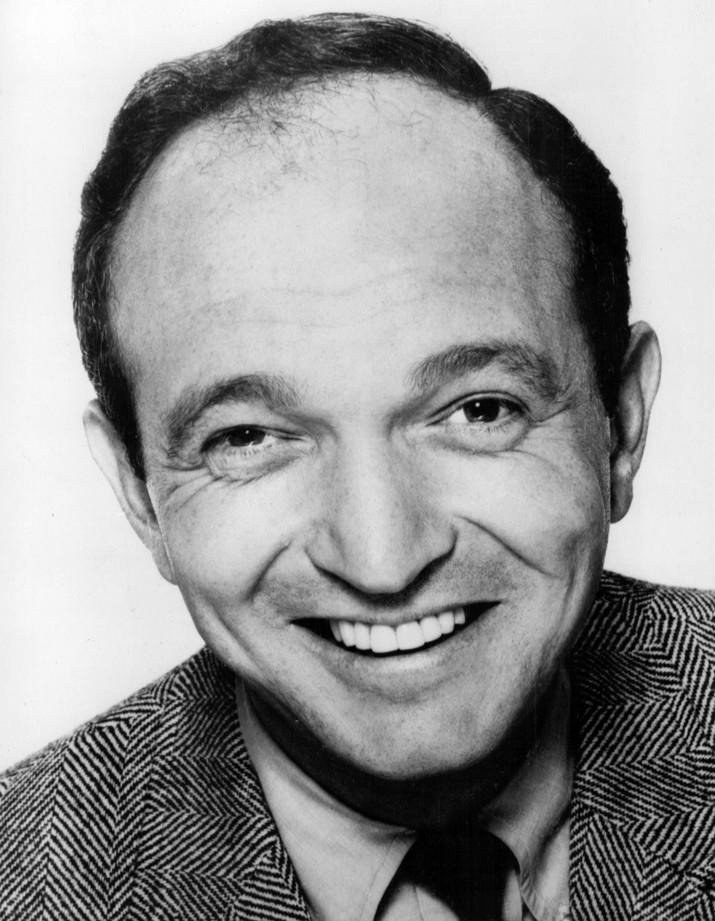
Bernard Barrow won in 1991 for his role as Louie Slavinski on Loving.

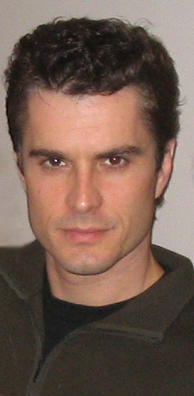
Rick Hearst was nominated three times for his role as Alan-Michael Spaulding on Guiding Light. He later won twice in 2004 and 2007 for his role as Ric Lansing on General Hospital including another nomination in 2005.

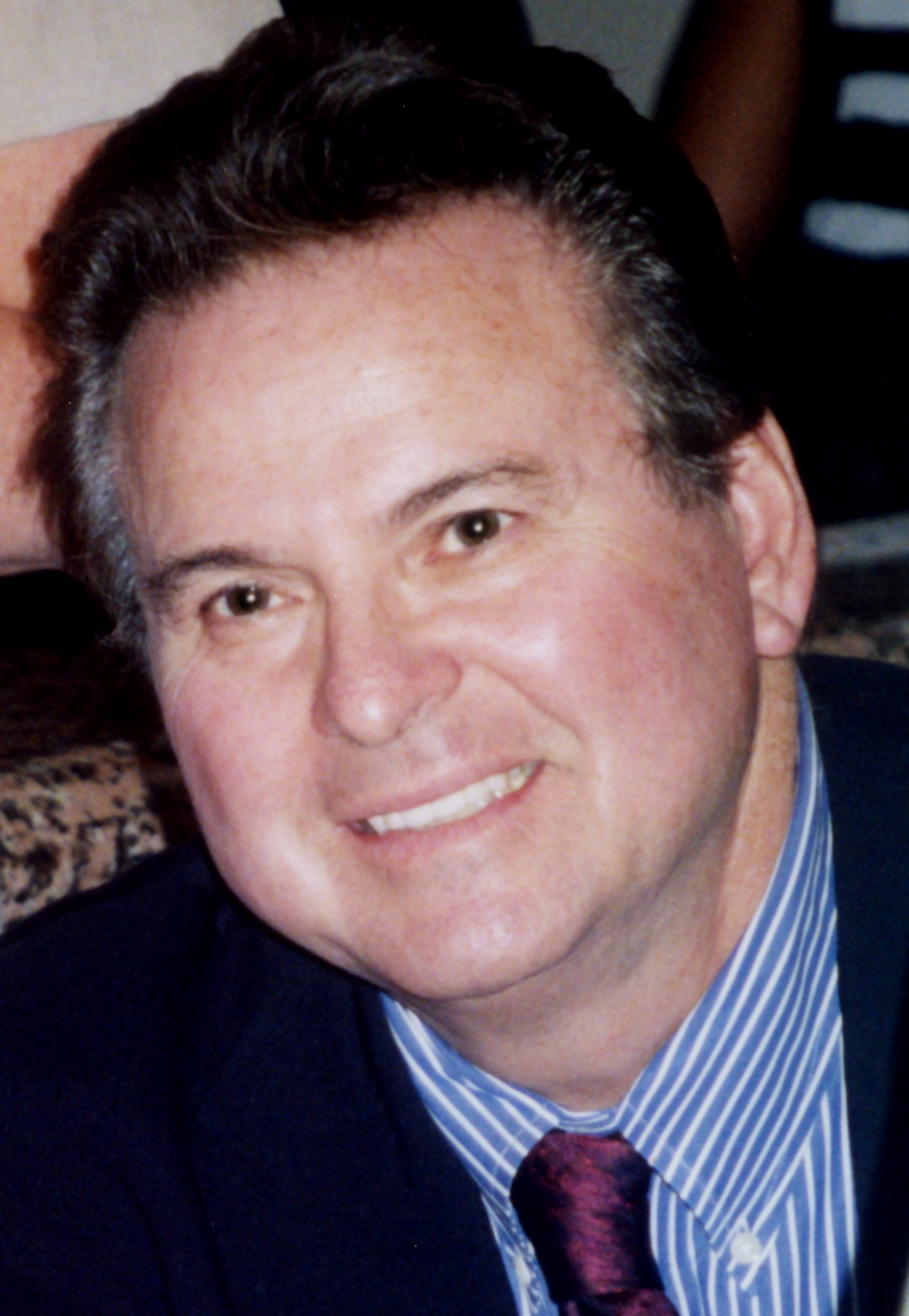
Stuart Damon won in 1999 for his role as Alan Quartermaine on General Hospital including a nomination in 1996.

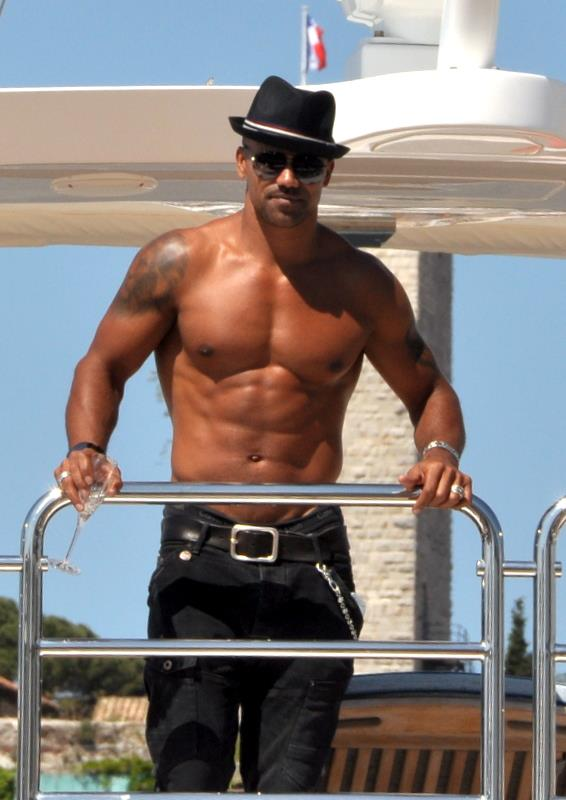
Shemar Moore (pictured in 2012) won in 2000 for his role as Malcolm Winters on The Young and the Restless.

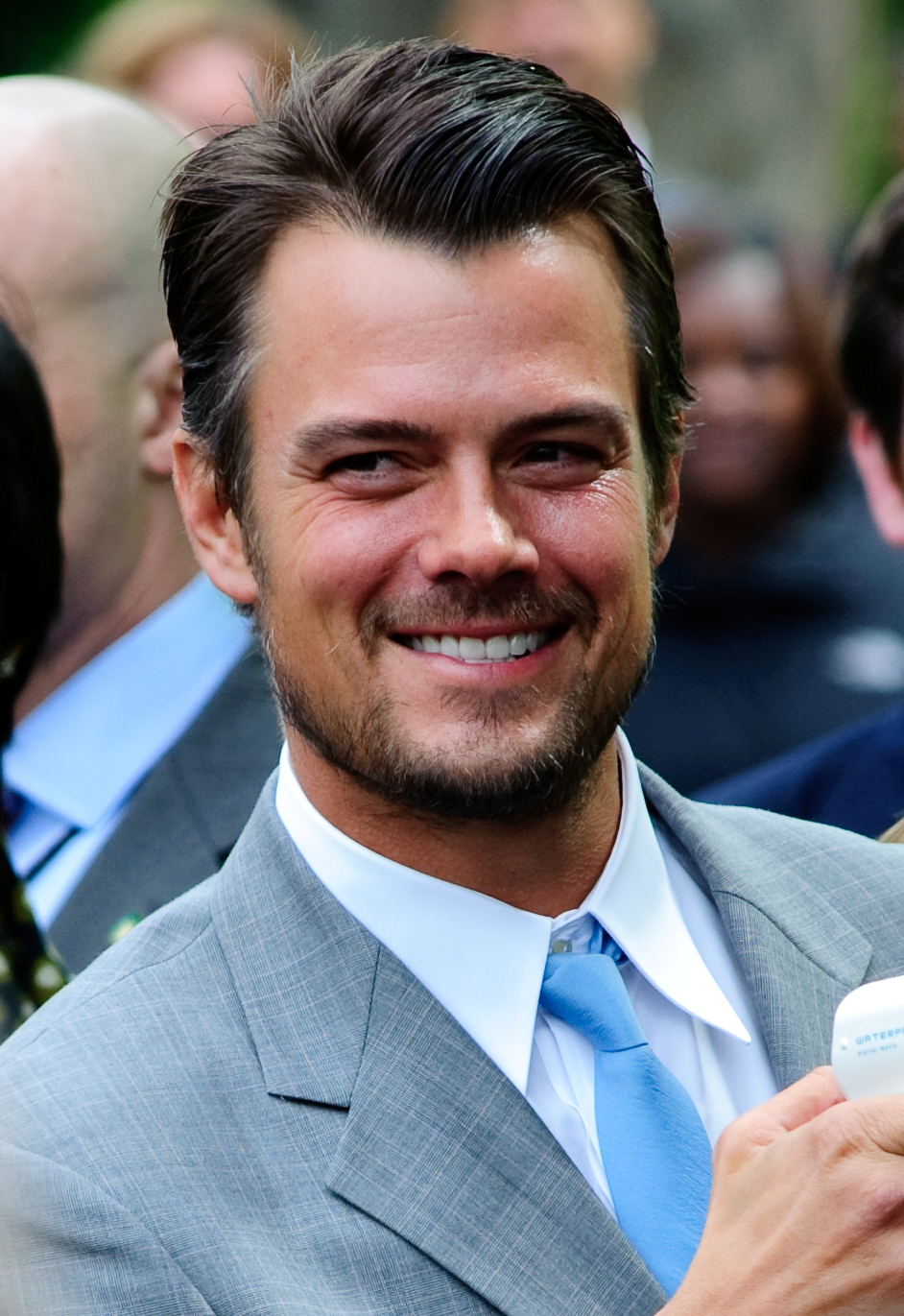
Josh Duhamel won in 2002 for his role as Leo du Pres on All My Children including nominations in 2001 and 2003.

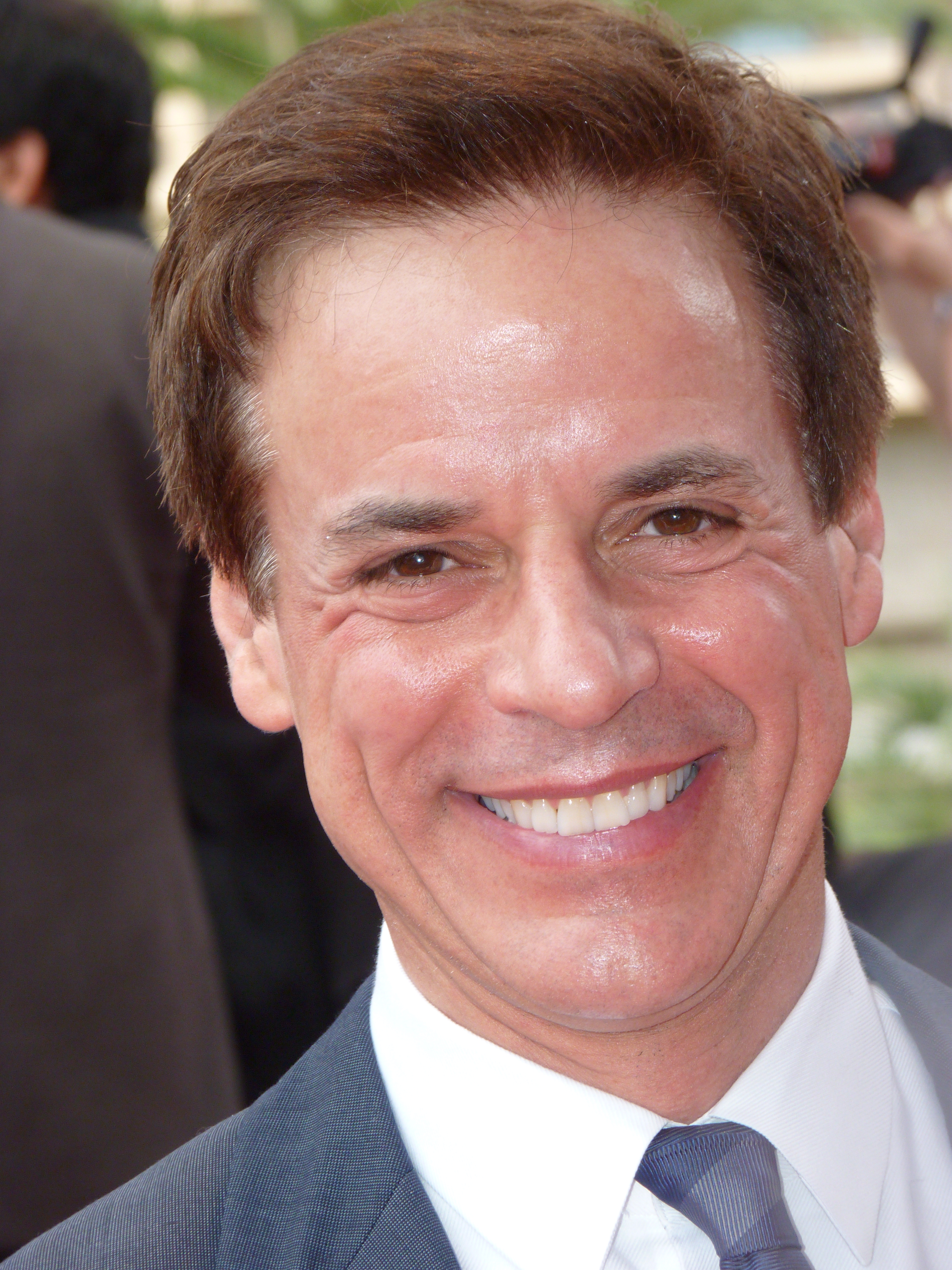
Christian LeBlanc was nominated four times for his role as Michael Baldwin on The Young and the Restless in 1999, 2000, 2003 and 2004.

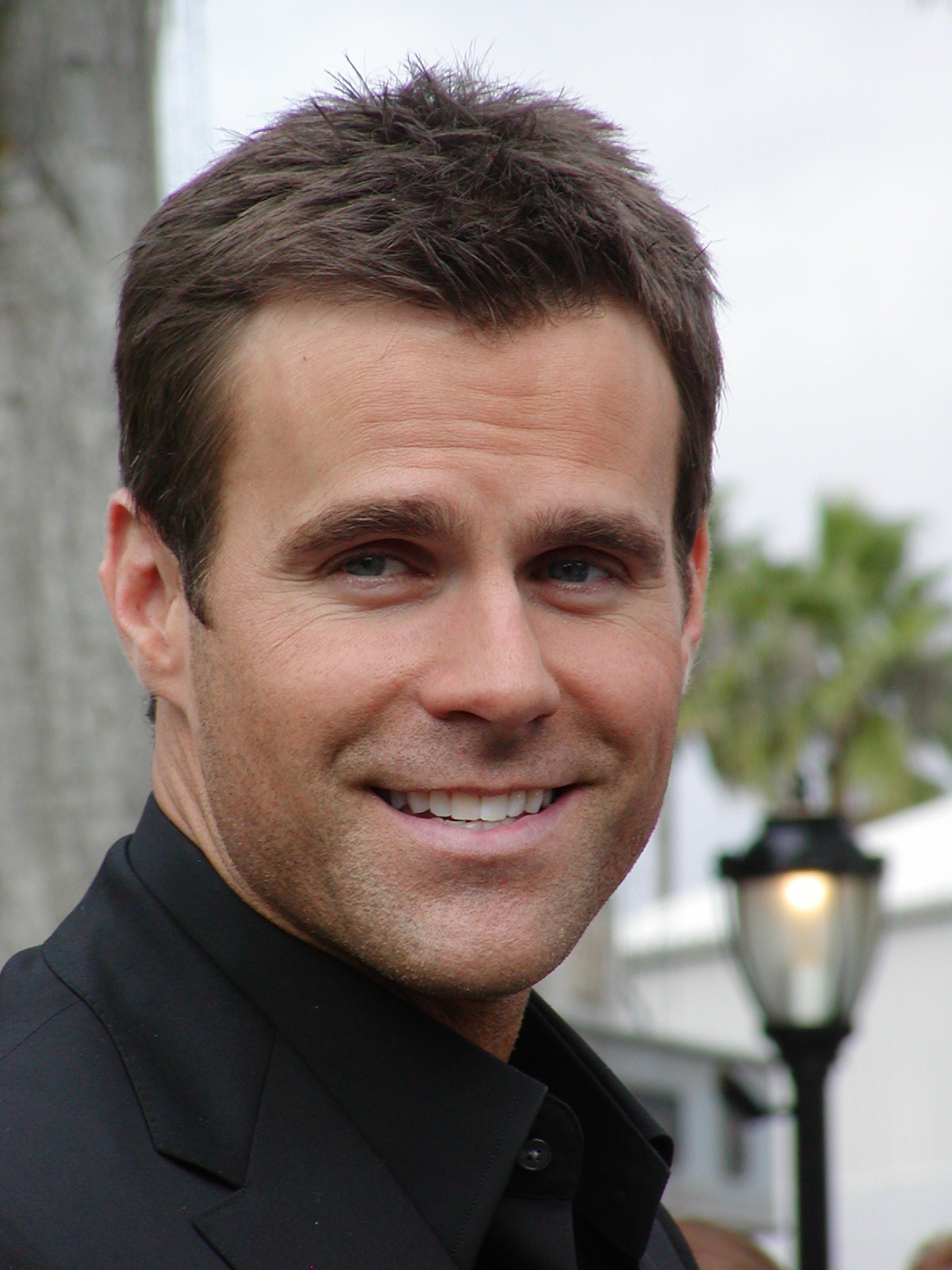
Cameron Mathison was nominated twice for his role as Ryan Lavery on All My Children in 2002 and 2005.

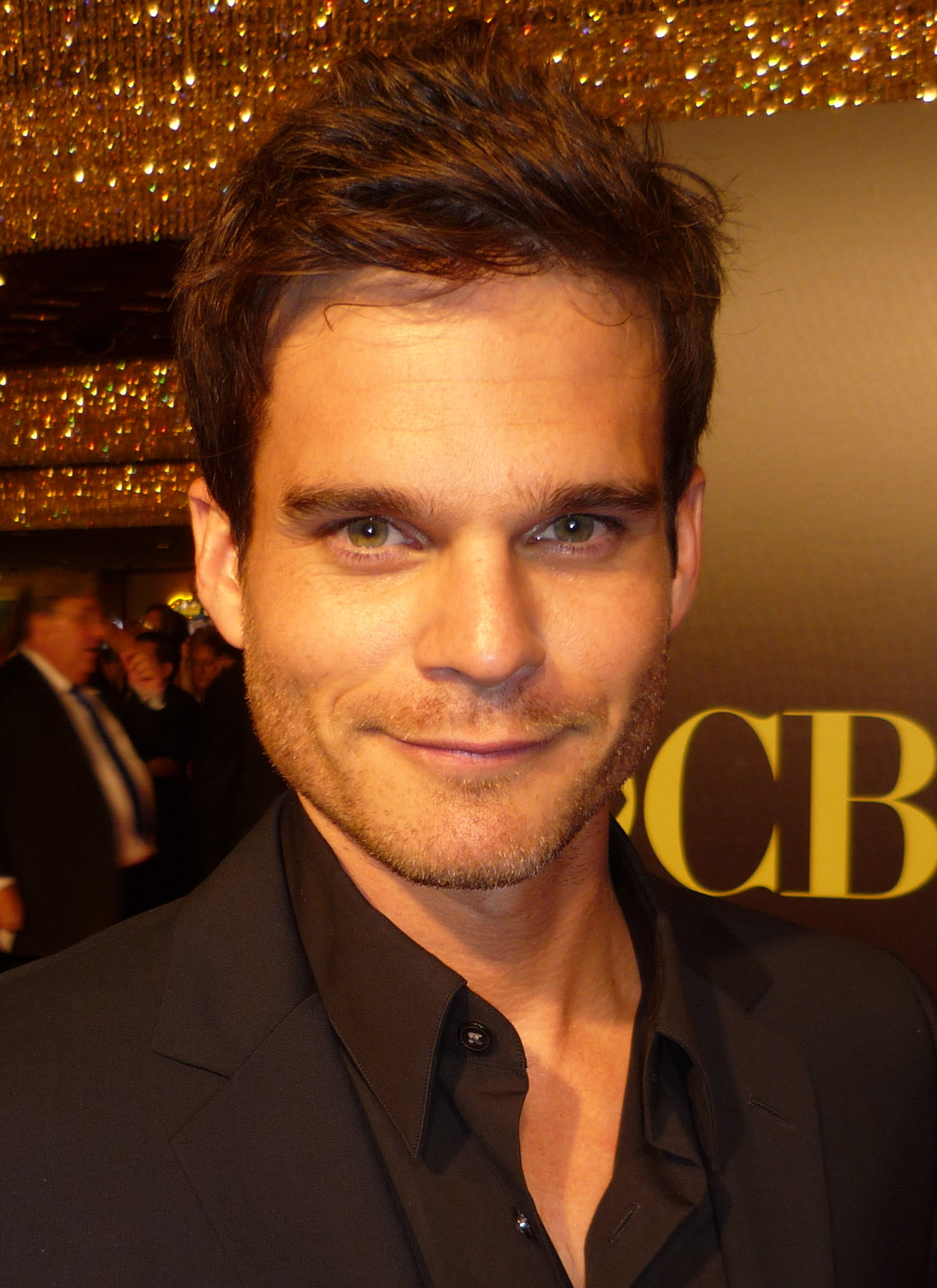
Greg Rikaart was nominated five times, winning in 2005 for his role as Kevin Fisher on The Young and the Restless. He also earned a nomination in 2019 for his work on Days of Our Lives.

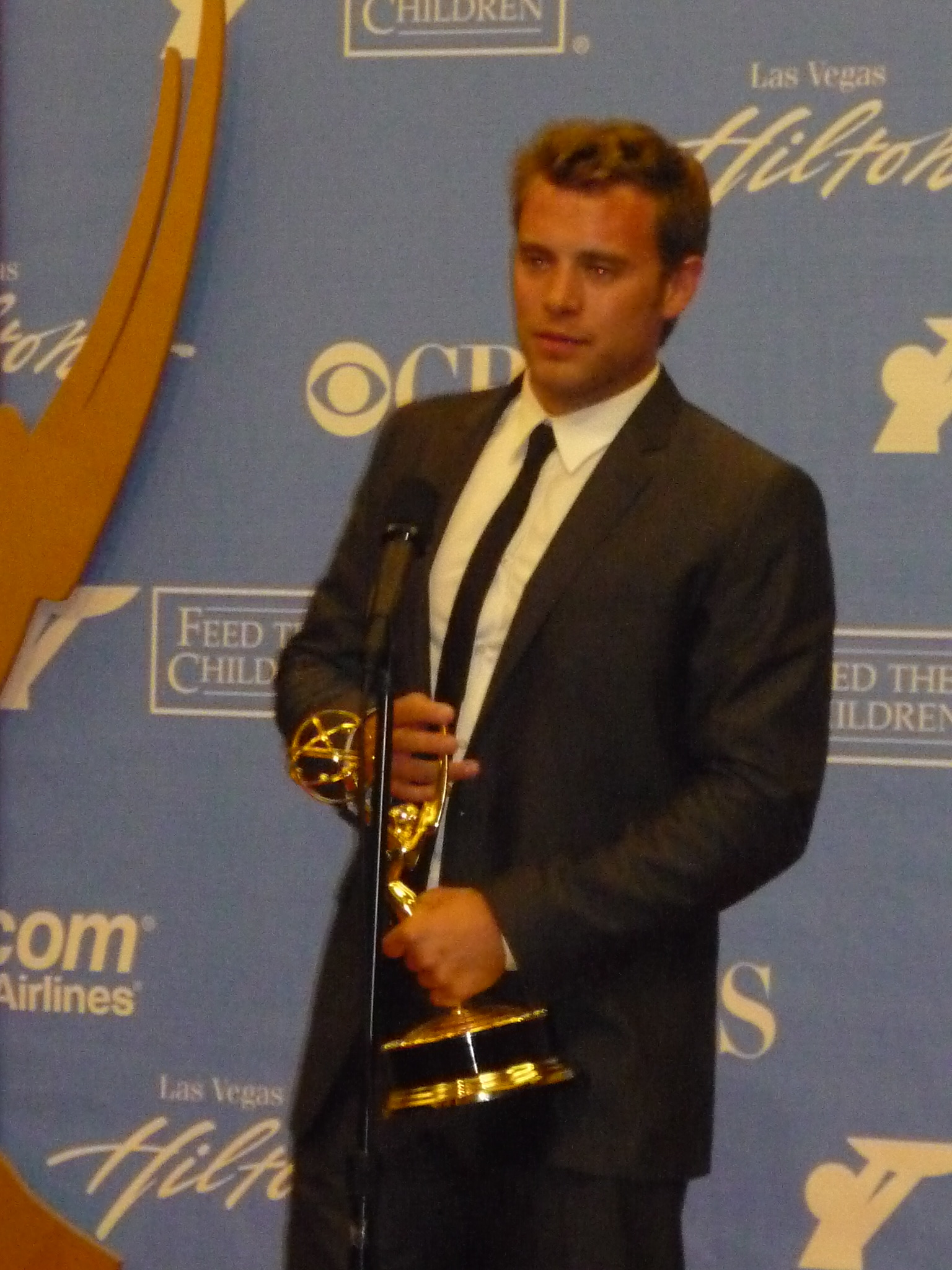
Billy Miller was nominated three times, winning in 2010 and 2013 for his role as Billy Abbott on The Young and the Restless.

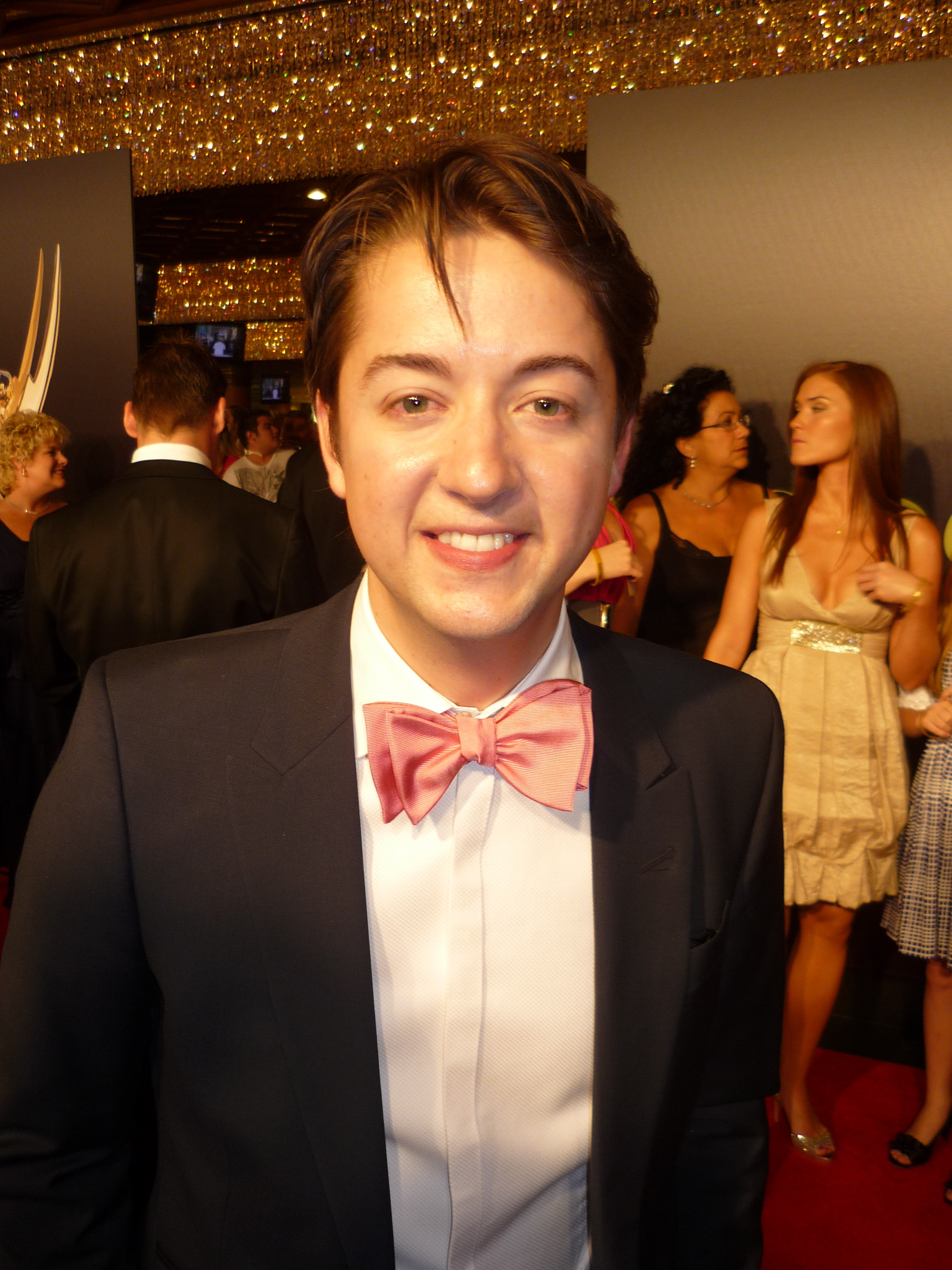
Bradford Anderson was nominated four times for his role as Damian Spinelli on General Hospital .

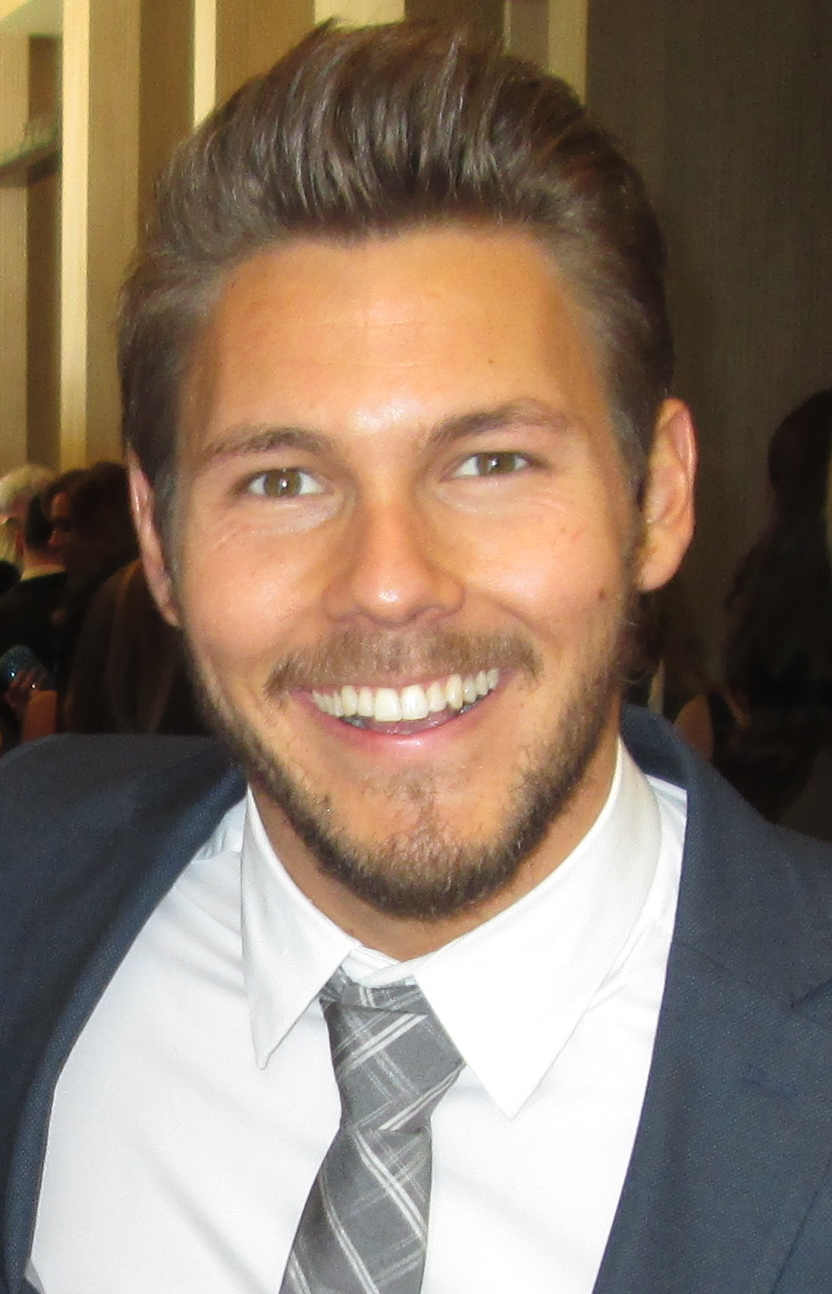
Scott Clifton was nominated three times, winning in 2013 for his role as Liam Spencer on The Bold and the Beautiful.

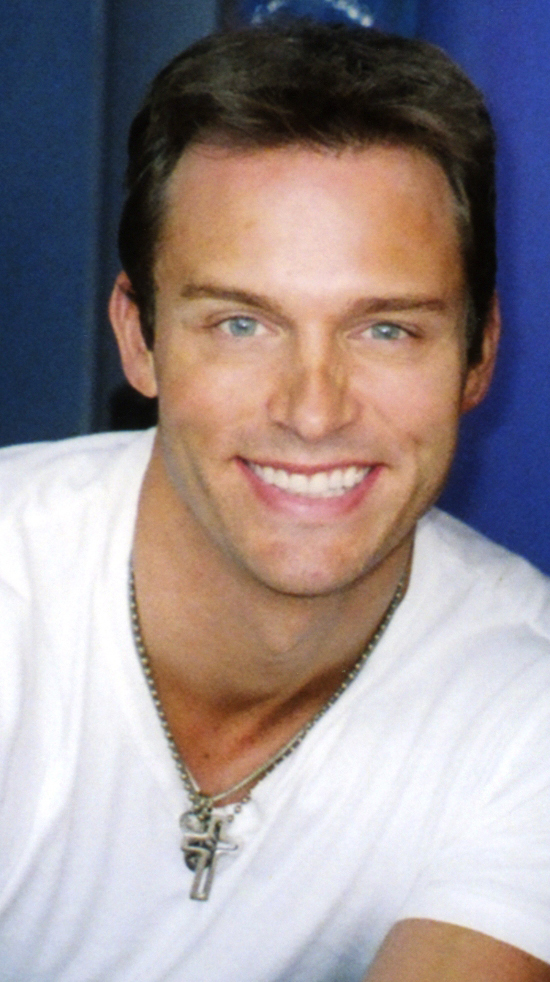
Eric Martsolf earned two nominations, winning in 2014 for his role as Brady Black on Days of Our Lives

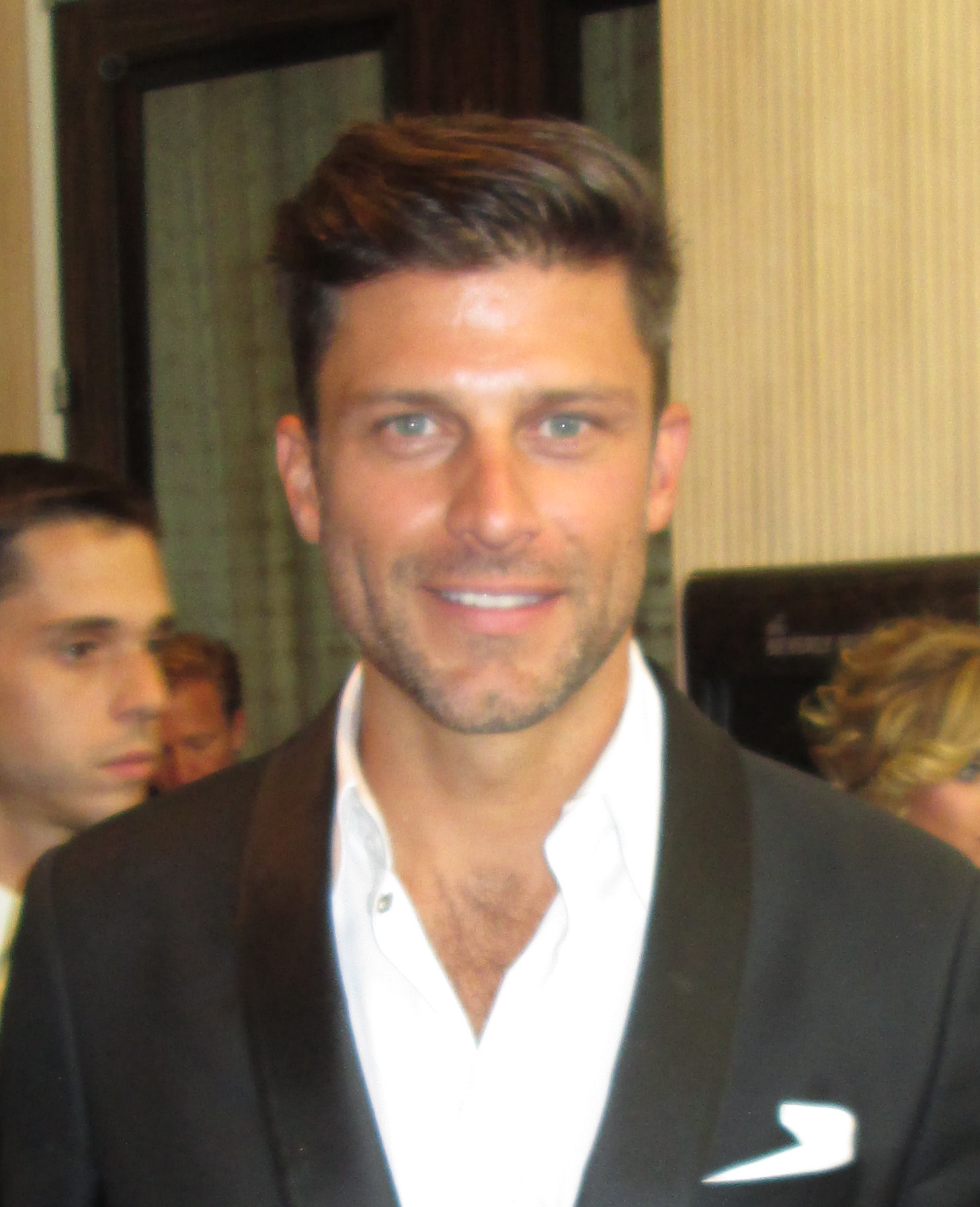
Greg Vaughan won in 2018 for his role as Eric Brady on Days of Our Lives

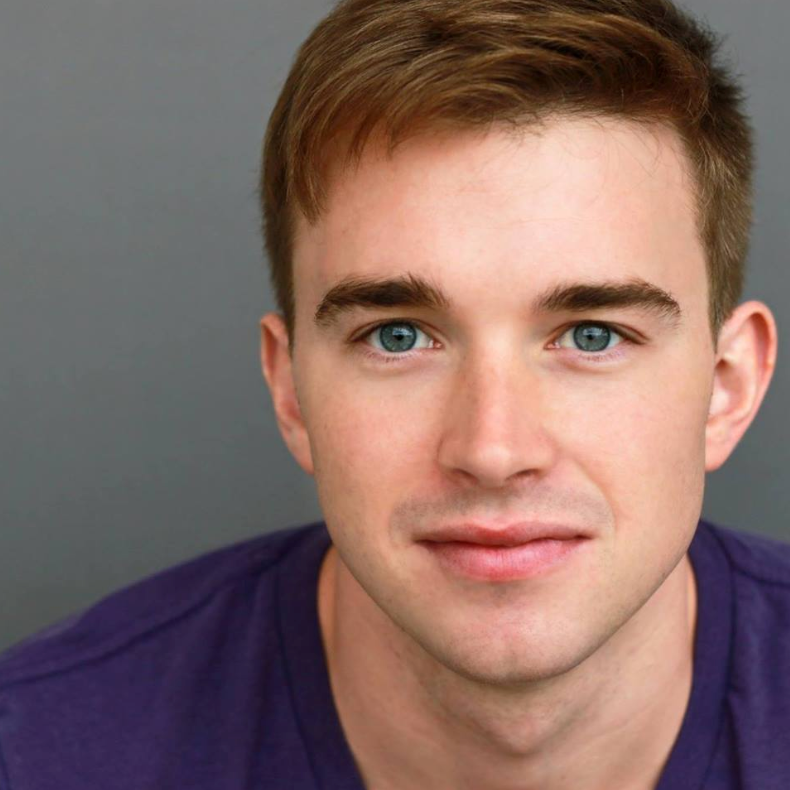
Chandler Massey, was nominated two times (2018 and 2020) for his role of Will Horton on Days of Our Lives.

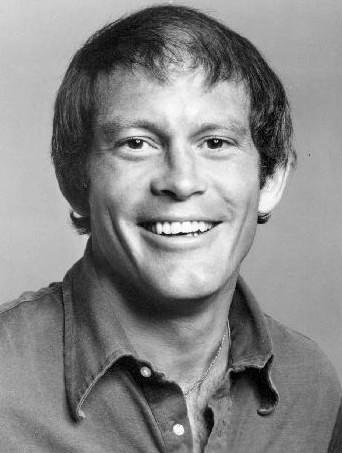
Max Gail won in 2019 and 2021 for his role as Mike Corbin on General Hospital.

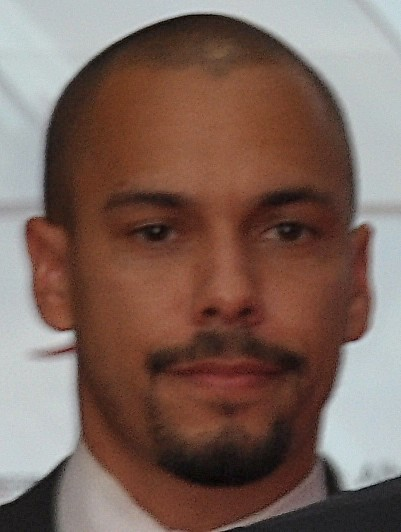
Bryton James received six nominations, winning in 2020 for his role as Devon Hamilton on The Young and the Restless.

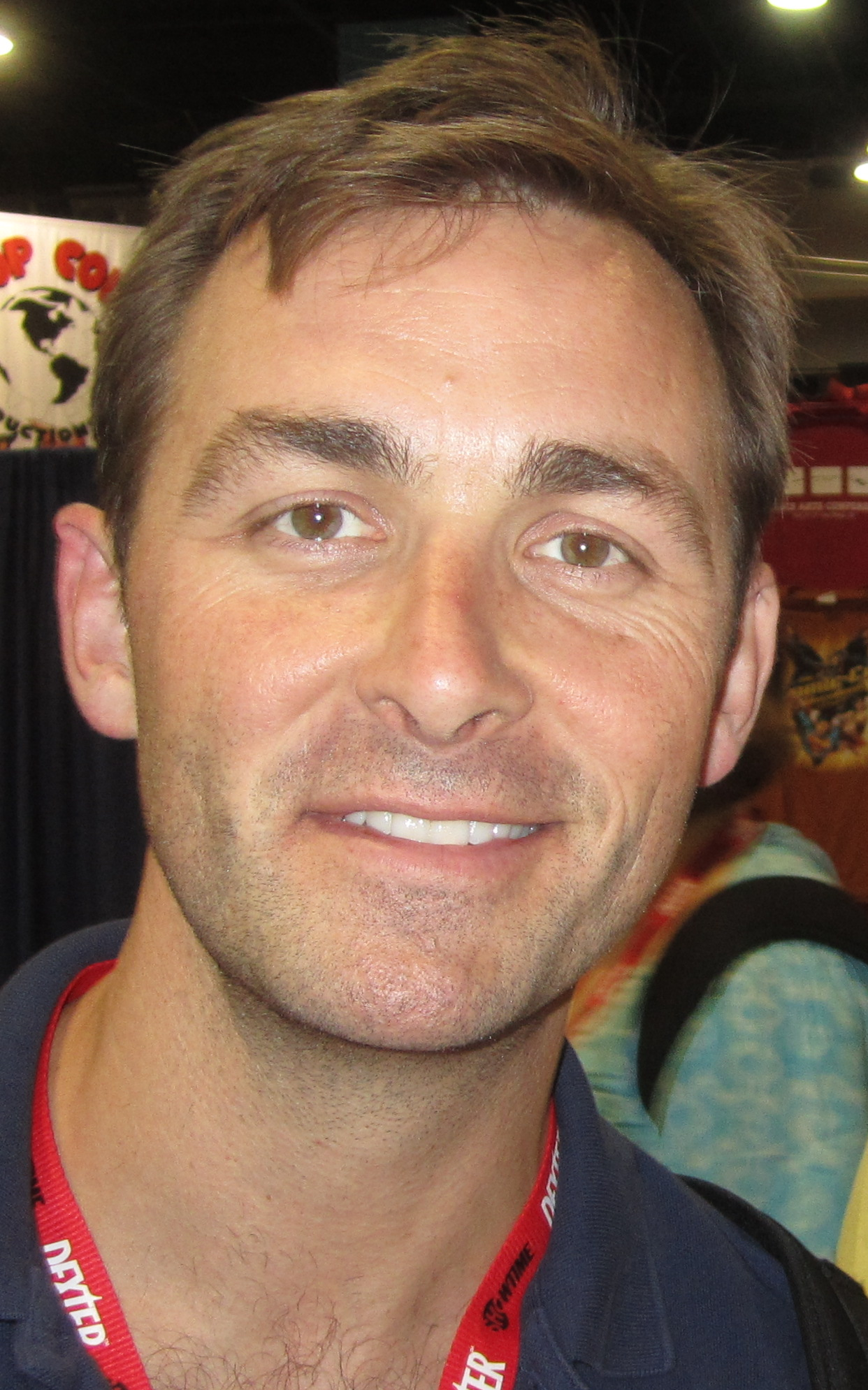
James Patrick Stuart earned three nominations for his role as Valentin Cassadine on General Hospital.

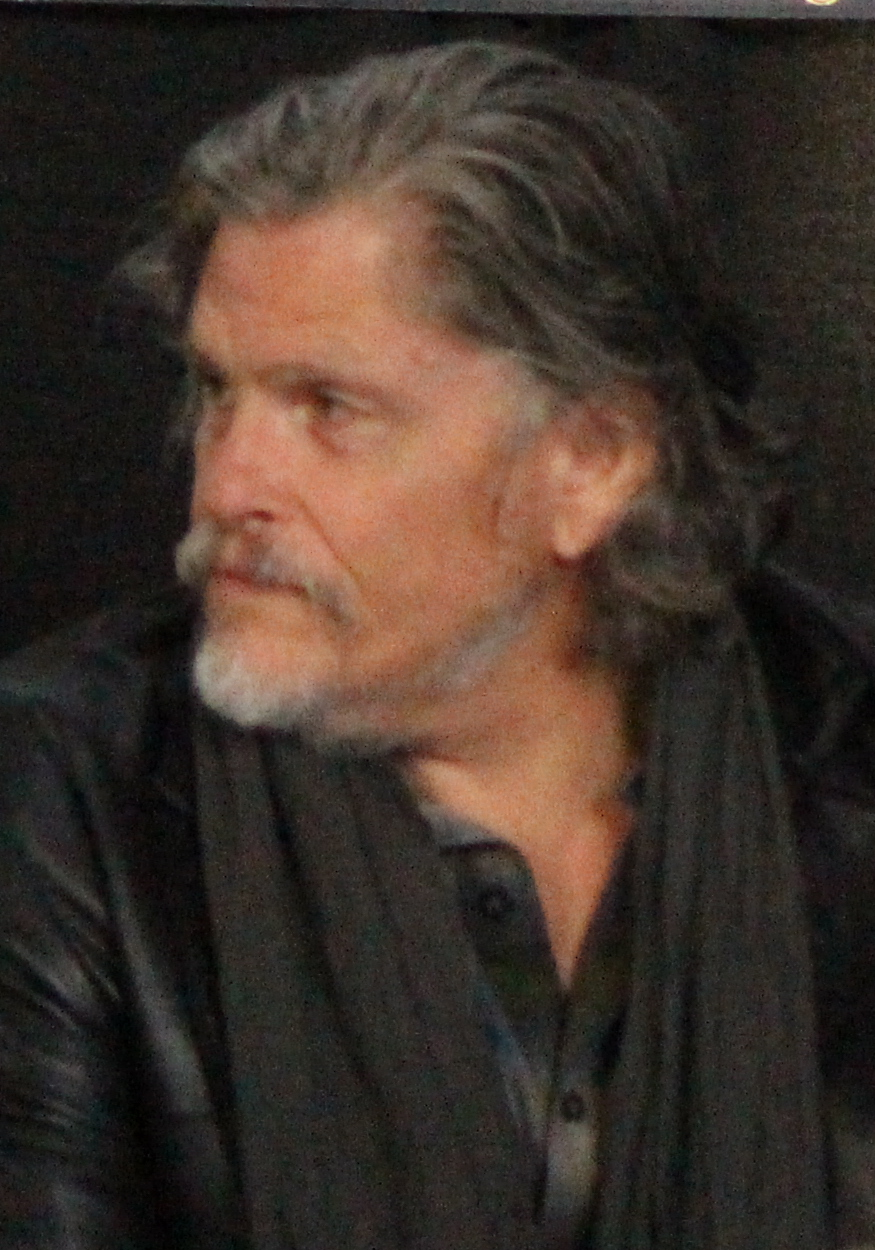
Jeff Kober received two nominations, winning once in 2022, for his role as Cyrus Renault on General Hospital.

Listed below are the winners of the award for each year, as well as the other nominees.

Table key
‡	Indicates the winner

=== 1970s ===
Year	Actor	Program	Role	Network	Ref.
1979 (6th)
1979 (6th)	Peter Hansen ‡	General Hospital	Lee Baldwin	ABC	
1979 (6th)	Lewis Arlt	Search for Tomorrow	David Sutton	CBS	
1979 (6th)	Bernard Barrow	Ryan's Hope	Johnny Ryan	ABC	
1979 (6th)	Ron Hale	Ryan's Hope	Roger Coleridge	ABC	
1979 (6th)	Joseph Gallison	Days of Our Lives	Neil Curtis	NBC	
1979 (6th)	Mandel Kramer	The Edge of Night	Bill Marceau	ABC	

=== 1980s ===
Year	Actor	Program	Role	Network	Ref.
1980 (7th)
1980 (7th)	Warren Burton ‡	All My Children	Eddie Dorrance	ABC	
1980 (7th)	Vasili Bogazianos	The Edge of Night	Mickey Dials	ABC	
1980 (7th)	Ron Hale	Ryan's Hope	Roger Coleridge	ABC	
1980 (7th)	Julius La Rosa	Another World	Renaldo	NBC	
1980 (7th)	Shepperd Strudwick	Love of Life	Timothy McCauley	CBS	
1981 (8th)
1981 (8th)	Larry Haines ‡	Search for Tomorrow	Stu Bergman	CBS	
1981 (8th)	Richard Backus	Ryan's Hope	Barry Ryan	ABC	
1981 (8th)	Matthew Cowles	All My Children	Billy Clyde Tuggle	ABC	
1981 (8th)	Justin Deas	As the World Turns	Tom Hughes	CBS	
1981 (8th)	William Mooney	All My Children	Paul Martin	ABC	
1982 (9th)
1982 (9th)	David Lewis ‡	General Hospital	Edward Quartermaine	ABC	
1982 (9th)	Gerald Anthony	One Life to Live	Marco Dane	ABC	
1982 (9th)	Douglas Sheehan	General Hospital	Joe Kelly	ABC	
1982 (9th)	Darnell Williams	All My Children	Jesse Hubbard	ABC	
1983 (10th)
1983 (10th)	Darnell Williams ‡	All My Children	Jesse Hubbard	ABC	
1983 (10th)	Anthony Call	One Life to Live	Herb Callison	ABC	
1983 (10th)	Al Freeman Jr.	One Life to Live	Ed Hall	ABC	
1983 (10th)	David Lewis	General Hospital	Edward Quartermaine	ABC	
1983 (10th)	Howard E. Rollins Jr.	Another World	Ed Harding	NBC	
1983 (10th)	John Stamos	General Hospital	Blackie Parrish	ABC	
1984 (11th)
1984 (11th)	Justin Deas ‡	As the World Turns	Tom Hughes	CBS	
1984 (11th)	Anthony Call	One Life to Live	Herb Callison	ABC	
1984 (11th)	Louis Edmonds	All My Children	Langley Wallingford	ABC	
1984 (11th)	David Lewis	General Hospital	Edward Quartermaine	ABC	
1984 (11th)	Paul Stevens	Another World	Brian Bancroft	NBC	
1985 (12th)
1985 (12th)	Larry Gates ‡	Guiding Light	H.B. Lewis	CBS	
1985 (12th)	Anthony Call	One Life to Live	Herb Callison	ABC	
1985 (12th)	Louis Edmonds	All My Children	Langley Wallingford	ABC	
1985 (12th)	David Lewis	General Hospital	Edward Quartermaine	ABC	
1985 (12th)	Robert LuPone	All My Children	Zach Grayson	ABC	
1986 (13th)
1986 (13th)	John Wesley Shipp ‡	As the World Turns	Doug Cummings	CBS	
1986 (13th)	Louis Edmonds	All My Children	Langley Wallingford	ABC	
1986 (13th)	Larry Gates	Guiding Light	H.B. Lewis	CBS	
1986 (13th)	Al Freeman Jr.	One Life to Live	Ed Hall	ABC	
1986 (13th)	Gregg Marx	As the World Turns	Tom Hughes	CBS	
1987 (14th)
1987 (14th)	Gregg Marx ‡	As the World Turns	Tom Hughes	CBS	
1987 (14th)	Anthony Call	One Life to Live	Herb Callison	ABC	
1987 (14th)	Justin Deas	Santa Barbara	Keith Timmons	NBC	
1987 (14th)	Richard Eden	Santa Barbara	Brick Wallace	NBC	
1987 (14th)	Al Freeman Jr.	One Life to Live	Ed Hall	ABC	
1988 (15th)
1988 (15th)	Justin Deas ‡	Santa Barbara	Keith Timmons	NBC	
1988 (15th)	Bernard Barrow	Ryan's Hope	Johnny Ryan	ABC	
1988 (15th)	Nicolas Coster	Santa Barbara	Lionel Lockridge	NBC	
1988 (15th)	Mark LaMura	All My Children	Mark Dalton	ABC	
1988 (15th)	David Lewis	General Hospital	Edward Quartermaine	ABC	
1989 (16th)
1989 (16th)	Justin Deas ‡	Santa Barbara	Keith Timmons	NBC	
1989 (16th)	Joseph Campanella	Days of Our Lives	Harper Deveraux	NBC	
1989 (16th)	David Forsyth	Another World	John Hudson	NBC	
1989 (16th)	Quinn Redeker	The Young and the Restless	Rex Sterling	CBS	

=== 1990s ===
Year	Actor	Program	Role	Network	Ref.
1990 (17th)
1990 (17th)	Henry Darrow ‡	Santa Barbara	Rafael Castillo	NBC	
1990 (17th)	Robert Gentry	All My Children	Ross Chandler	ABC	
1990 (17th)	Quinn Redeker	The Young and the Restless	Rex Sterling	CBS	
1990 (17th)	Kin Shriner	General Hospital	Scott Baldwin	ABC	
1990 (17th)	Kristoff St. John	Generations	Adam Marshall	NBC	
1990 (17th)	Jerry verDorn	Guiding Light	Ross Marler	CBS	
1991 (18th)
1991 (18th)	Bernard Barrow ‡	Loving	Louie Slavinski	ABC	
1991 (18th)	William Christian	All My Children	Derek Frye	ABC	
1991 (18th)	Stuart Damon	General Hospital	Alan Quartermaine	ABC	
1991 (18th)	William Roerick	Guiding Light	Henry Chamberlain	CBS	
1991 (18th)	Kin Shriner	General Hospital	Scott Baldwin	ABC	
1991 (18th)	Jerry verDorn	Guiding Light	Ross Marler	CBS	
1992 (19th)
1992 (19th)	Thom Christopher ‡	One Life to Live	Carlo Hesser	ABC	
1992 (19th)	Bernard Barrow	Loving	Louie Slavinski	ABC	
1992 (19th)	Rick Hearst	Guiding Light	Alan-Michael Spaulding	CBS	
1992 (19th)	Charles Keating	Another World	Carl Hutchins	NBC	
1992 (19th)	Jerry verDorn	Guiding Light	Ross Marler	CBS	
1993 (20th)
1993 (20th)	Gerald Anthony ‡	General Hospital	Marco Dane	ABC	
1993 (20th)	Thom Christopher	One Life to Live	Mortimer Bern	ABC	
1993 (20th)	Rick Hearst	Guiding Light	Alan-Michael Spaulding	CBS	
1993 (20th)	Charles Keating	Another World	Carl Hutchins	NBC	
1993 (20th)	Kin Shriner	General Hospital	Scott Baldwin	ABC	
1994 (21st)
1994 (21st)	Justin Deas ‡	Guiding Light	Buzz Cooper	CBS	
1994 (21st)	Ian Buchanan	The Bold and the Beautiful	James Warwick	CBS	
1994 (21st)	Thom Christopher	Loving	Dante Partou	ABC	
1994 (21st)	Patrick Tovatt	As the World Turns	Cal Stricklyn	CBS	
1994 (21st)	Jerry verDorn	Guiding Light	Ross Marler	CBS	
1995 (22nd)
1995 (22nd)	Jerry verDorn ‡	Guiding Light	Ross Marler	CBS	
1995 (22nd)	Ian Buchanan	The Bold and the Beautiful	James Warwick	CBS	
1995 (22nd)	Keith Hamilton Cobb	All My Children	Noah Keefer	ABC	
1995 (22nd)	Rick Hearst	Guiding Light	Alan-Michael Spaulding	CBS	
1995 (22nd)	Roger Howarth	One Life to Live	Todd Manning	ABC	
1996 (23rd)
1996 (23rd)	Jerry verDorn ‡	Guiding Light	Ross Marler	CBS	
1996 (23rd)	Frank Beaty	Guiding Light	Brent Lawrence	CBS	
1996 (23rd)	Ian Buchanan	The Bold and the Beautiful	James Warwick	CBS	
1996 (23rd)	Stuart Damon	General Hospital	Alan Quartermaine	ABC	
1996 (23rd)	David Forsyth	Another World	John Hudson	NBC	
1996 (23rd)	Michael Sutton	General Hospital	Stone Cates	ABC	
1997 (24th)
1997 (24th)	Ian Buchanan ‡	The Bold and the Beautiful	James Warwick	CBS	
1997 (24th)	Maurice Benard	General Hospital	Sonny Corinthos	ABC	
1997 (24th)	Stuart Damon	General Hospital	Alan Quartermaine	ABC	
1997 (24th)	Aaron Lustig	The Young and the Restless	Tim Reid	CBS	
1997 (24th)	Brad Maule	General Hospital	Tony Jones	ABC	
1997 (24th)	Scott Reeves	The Young and the Restless	Ryan McNeil	CBS	
1998 (25th)
1998 (25th)	Steve Burton ‡	General Hospital	Jason Morgan	ABC	
1998 (25th)	Grant Aleksander	Guiding Light	Phillip Spaulding	CBS	
1998 (25th)	Ian Buchanan	The Bold and the Beautiful	James Warwick	CBS	
1998 (25th)	Michael E. Knight	All My Children	Tad Martin	ABC	
1998 (25th)	Scott Reeves	The Young and the Restless	Ryan McNeil	CBS	
1999 (26th)
1999 (26th)	Stuart Damon ‡	General Hospital	Alan Quartermaine	ABC	
1999 (26th)	Michael E. Knight	All My Children	Tad Martin	ABC	
1999 (26th)	Christian LeBlanc	The Young and the Restless	Michael Baldwin	CBS	
1999 (26th)	Kristoff St. John	The Young and the Restless	Neil Winters	CBS	
1999 (26th)	Jerry verDorn	Guiding Light	Ross Marler	CBS	

=== 2000s ===
Year	Actor	Program	Role	Network	Ref.
2000 (27th)
2000 (27th)	Shemar Moore ‡	The Young and the Restless	Malcolm Winters	CBS	
2000 (27th)	Steve Burton	General Hospital	Jason Morgan	ABC	
2000 (27th)	Timothy Gibbs	One Life to Live	Kevin Buchanan	ABC	
2000 (27th)	Christian LeBlanc	The Young and the Restless	Michael Baldwin	CBS	
2000 (27th)	Kristoff St. John	The Young and the Restless	Neil Winters	CBS	
2001 (28th)
2001 (28th)	Michael E. Knight ‡	All My Children	Tad Martin	ABC	
2001 (28th)	Hunt Block	As the World Turns	Craig Montgomery	CBS	
2001 (28th)	Josh Duhamel	All My Children	Leo du Pres	ABC	
2001 (28th)	Benjamin Hendrickson	As the World Turns	Hal Munson	CBS	
2001 (28th)	Michael Park	As the World Turns	Jack Snyder	CBS	
2002 (29th)
2002 (29th)	Josh Duhamel ‡	All My Children	Leo du Pres	ABC	
2002 (29th)	Mark Consuelos	All My Children	Mateo Santos	ABC	
2002 (29th)	Benjamin Hendrickson	As the World Turns	Hal Munson	CBS	
2002 (29th)	Paul Leyden	As the World Turns	Simon Frasier	CBS	
2002 (29th)	Cameron Mathison	All My Children	Ryan Lavery	ABC	
2003 (30th)
2003 (30th)	Benjamin Hendrickson ‡	As the World Turns	Hal Munson	CBS	
2003 (30th)	Josh Duhamel	All My Children	Leo du Pres	ABC	
2003 (30th)	Christian LeBlanc	The Young and the Restless	Michael Baldwin	CBS	
2003 (30th)	Ron Raines	Guiding Light	Alan Spaulding	CBS	
2003 (30th)	Paul Anthony Stewart	Guiding Light	Danny Santos	CBS	
2004 (31st)
2004 (31st)	Rick Hearst ‡	General Hospital	Ric Lansing	ABC	
2004 (31st)	William deVry	All My Children	Michael Cambias	ABC	
2004 (31st)	Christian LeBlanc	The Young and the Restless	Michael Baldwin	CBS	
2004 (31st)	Ron Raines	Guiding Light	Alan Spaulding	CBS	
2004 (31st)	James Reynolds	Days of Our Lives	Abe Carver	NBC	
2005 (32nd)
2005 (32nd)	Greg Rikaart ‡	The Young and the Restless	Kevin Fisher	CBS	
2005 (32nd)	Jeff Branson	All My Children	Jonathan Lavery	ABC	
2005 (32nd)	Tyler Christopher	General Hospital	Nikolas Cassadine	ABC	
2005 (32nd)	Justin Deas	Guiding Light	Buzz Cooper	CBS	
2005 (32nd)	Rick Hearst	General Hospital	Ric Lansing	ABC	
2005 (32nd)	Cameron Mathison	All My Children	Ryan Lavery	ABC	
2006 (33rd)
2006 (33rd)	Jordan Clarke ‡	Guiding Light	Billy Lewis	CBS	
2006 (33rd)	Tyler Christopher	General Hospital	Nikolas Cassadine	ABC	
2006 (33rd)	Trent Dawson	As the World Turns	Henry Coleman	CBS	
2006 (33rd)	Grayson McCouch	As the World Turns	Dusty Donovan	CBS	
2006 (33rd)	Greg Rikaart	The Young and the Restless	Kevin Fisher	CBS	
2007 (34th)
2007 (34th)	Rick Hearst ‡	General Hospital	Ric Lansing	ABC	
2007 (34th)	Trent Dawson	As the World Turns	Henry Coleman	CBS	
2007 (34th)	Dan Gauthier	One Life to Live	Kevin Buchanan	ABC	
2007 (34th)	Greg Rikaart	The Young and the Restless	Kevin Fisher	CBS	
2007 (34th)	Kristoff St. John	The Young and the Restless	Neil Winters	CBS	
2008 (35th)
2008 (35th)	Kristoff St. John ‡	The Young and the Restless	Neil Winters	CBS	
2008 (35th)	Daniel Cosgrove	Guiding Light	Bill Lewis	CBS	
2008 (35th)	Trent Dawson	As the World Turns	Henry Coleman	CBS	
2008 (35th)	Brian Kerwin	One Life to Live	Charlie Banks	ABC	
2008 (35th)	Greg Rikaart	The Young and the Restless	Kevin Fisher	CBS	
2009 (36th)
2009 (36th)	Jeff Branson ‡	Guiding Light	Shayne Lewis	CBS	
2009 (36th)	Vincent Irizarry‡	All My Children	David Hayward	ABC	
2009 (36th)	Bradford Anderson	General Hospital	Damian Spinelli	ABC	
2009 (36th)	Van Hansis	As the World Turns	Luke Snyder	CBS	
2009 (36th)	Jacob Young	All My Children	JR Chandler	ABC	

=== 2010s ===
Year	Actor	Program	Role	Network	Ref.
2010 (37th)
2010 (37th)	Billy Miller ‡	The Young and the Restless	Billy Abbott	CBS	
2010 (37th)	Bradford Anderson	General Hospital	Damian Spinelli	ABC	
2010 (37th)	Ricky Paull Goldin	All My Children	Jake Martin	ABC	
2010 (37th)	Jonathan Jackson	General Hospital	Lucky Spencer	ABC	
2010 (37th)	Brian Kerwin	One Life to Live	Charlie Banks	ABC	
2011 (38th)
2011 (38th)	Jonathan Jackson ‡	General Hospital	Lucky Spencer	ABC	
2011 (38th)	Doug Davidson	The Young and the Restless	Paul Williams	CBS	
2011 (38th)	Brian Kerwin	One Life to Live	Charlie Banks	ABC	
2011 (38th)	Billy Miller	The Young and the Restless	Billy Abbott	CBS	
2011 (38th)	Jason Thompson	General Hospital	Dr. Patrick Drake	ABC	
2012 (39th)
2012 (39th)	Jonathan Jackson ‡	General Hospital	Lucky Spencer	ABC	
2012 (39th)	Bradford Anderson	General Hospital	Damian Spinelli	ABC	
2012 (39th)	Matthew Ashford	Days of Our Lives	Jack Deveraux	NBC	
2012 (39th)	Sean Blakemore	General Hospital	Shawn Butler	ABC	
2012 (39th)	Jason Thompson	General Hospital	Dr. Patrick Drake	ABC	
2013 (40th)
2013 (40th)	Scott Clifton ‡	The Bold and the Beautiful	Liam Spencer	CBS	
2013 (40th)	Billy Miller ‡	The Young and the Restless	Billy Abbott	CBS	
2013 (40th)	Bradford Anderson	General Hospital	Damian Spinelli	ABC	
2013 (40th)	Jeff Branson	The Young and the Restless	Ronan Malloy	CBS	
2014 (41st)
2014 (41st)	Eric Martsolf ‡	Days of Our Lives	Brady Black	NBC	
2014 (41st)	Bradford Anderson	General Hospital	Damian Spinelli	ABC	
2014 (41st)	Steve Burton	The Young and the Restless	Dylan McAvoy	CBS	
2014 (41st)	Scott Clifton	The Bold and the Beautiful	Liam Spencer	CBS	
2014 (41st)	Dominic Zamprogna	General Hospital	Dante Falconeri	ABC	
2015 (42nd)
2015 (42nd)	Chad Duell ‡	General Hospital	Michael Corinthos	ABC	
2015 (42nd)	Scott Clifton	The Bold and the Beautiful	Liam Spencer	CBS	
2015 (42nd)	Kristoff St. John	The Young and the Restless	Neil Winters	CBS	
2015 (42nd)	Jacob Young	The Bold and the Beautiful	Rick Forrester	CBS	
2016 (43rd)
2016 (43rd)	Sean Blakemore ‡	General Hospital	Shawn Butler	ABC	
2016 (43rd)	Steve Burton	The Young and the Restless	Dylan McAvoy	CBS	
2016 (43rd)	Bryton James	The Young and the Restless	Devon Hamilton	CBS	
2016 (43rd)	Jacob Young	The Bold and the Beautiful	Rick Forrester	CBS	
2016 (43rd)	Dominic Zamprogna	General Hospital	Dante Falconeri	ABC	
2017 (44th)
2017 (44th)	Steve Burton ‡	The Young and the Restless	Dylan McAvoy	CBS	
2017 (44th)	John Aniston	Days of Our Lives	Victor Kiriakis	NBC	
2017 (44th)	Chad Duell	General Hospital	Michael Corinthos	ABC	
2017 (44th)	Jeffrey Vincent Parise	General Hospital	Carlos Rivera / Dr. Joe Rivera	ABC	
2017 (44th)	James Reynolds	Days of Our Lives	Abe Carver	NBC	
2018 (45th)
2018 (45th)	Greg Vaughan ‡	Days of Our Lives	Eric Brady	NBC	
2018 (45th)	Wally Kurth	General Hospital	Ned Quartermaine	CBS	
2018 (45th)	Chandler Massey	Days of Our Lives	Will Horton	NBC	
2018 (45th)	Anthony Montgomery	General Hospital	Dr. Andre Maddox	ABC	
2018 (45th)	Greg Rikaart	The Young and the Restless	Kevin Fisher	CBS	
2019 (46th)
2019 (46th)	Max Gail ‡	General Hospital	Mike Corbin	ABC	
2019 (46th)	Bryton James	The Young and the Restless	Devon Hamilton	CBS	
2019 (46th)	Eric Martsolf	Days of Our Lives	Brady Black	NBC	
2019 (46th)	Greg Rikaart	Days of Our Lives	Leo Stark	NBC	
2019 (46th)	Dominic Zamprogna	General Hospital	Dante Falconeri	ABC	

=== 2020s ===
Year	Actor	Program	Role	Network	Ref.
2020 (47th)
2020 (47th)	Bryton James ‡	The Young and the Restless	Devon Hamilton	CBS	
2020 (47th)	Mark Grossman	The Young and the Restless	Adam Newman	CBS	
2020 (47th)	Wally Kurth	Days of Our Lives	Justin Kiriakis	NBC	
2020 (47th)	Chandler Massey	Days of Our Lives	Will Horton	NBC	
2020 (47th)	James Patrick Stuart	General Hospital	Valentin Cassadine	ABC	
2020 (47th)	Paul Telfer	Days of Our Lives	Xander Kiriakis	NBC	
2021 (48th)
2021 (48th)	Max Gail ‡	General Hospital	Mike Corbin	ABC	
2021 (48th)	Darin Brooks	The Bold and the Beautiful	Wyatt Spencer	CBS	
2021 (48th)	Bryton James	The Young and the Restless	Devon Hamilton	CBS	
2021 (48th)	Jeff Kober	General Hospital	Cyrus Renault	ABC	
2021 (48th)	James Patrick Stuart	General Hospital	Valentin Cassadine	ABC	
2022 (49th)
2022 (49th)	Jeff Kober ‡	General Hospital	Cyrus Renault	ABC	
2022 (49th)	Bryton James	The Young and the Restless	Devon Hamilton	CBS	
2022 (49th)	Aaron D. Spears	The Bold and the Beautiful	Justin Barber	CBS	
2022 (49th)	James Patrick Stuart	General Hospital	Valentin Cassadine	ABC	
2022 (49th)	Jordi Vilasuso	The Young and the Restless	Rey Rosales	CBS	
2023 (50th)
2023 (50th)	Robert Gossett ‡	General Hospital	Marshall Ashford	ABC	
2023 (50th)	Nicholas Chavez	General Hospital	Spencer Cassadine	ABC	
2023 (50th)	Chad Duell	General Hospital	Michael Corinthos	ABC	
2023 (50th)	Dan Feuerriegel	Days of Our Lives	EJ DiMera	NBC/Peacock	
2023 (50th)	Jon Lindstrom	General Hospital	Dr. Kevin Collins/Ryan Chamberlain	ABC	
2024 (51st)
2024 (51st)	Robert Gossett ‡	General Hospital	Marshall Ashford	ABC	
2024 (51st)	Bryton James	The Young and the Restless	Devon Hamilton	CBS	
2024 (51st)	Wally Kurth	Days of Our Lives	Justin Kiriakis	Peacock	
2024 (51st)	Mike Manning	The Bay	Caleb McKinnon	Popstar! TV	
2024 (51st)	A Martinez	The Bay	Nardo Ramos	Popstar! TV	
2025 (52nd)
2025 (52nd)	Jonathan Jackson ‡	General Hospital	Lucky Spencer	ABC	
2025 (52nd)	Tajh Bellow	General Hospital	TJ Ashford	ABC	
2025 (52nd)	Blake Berris	Days of Our Lives	Everett Lynch	Peacock	
2025 (52nd)	Michael Graziadei	The Young and the Restless	Daniel Romalotti	CBS	
2025 (52nd)	Gregory Harrison	General Hospital	Gregory Chase	ABC	
2026 (53rd)
2026 (53rd)	Roger Howarth ‡	The Young and the Restless	Matt Clark	CBS	
2026 (53rd)	Sean Dominic	The Young and the Restless	Nate Hastings	CBS	
2026 (53rd)	Timon Kyle Durrett	Beyond the Gates	Bill Hamilton	CBS	
2026 (53rd)	Michael Graziadei	The Young and the Restless	Daniel Romalotti	CBS	
2026 (53rd)	Mike Manning	Beyond the Gates	Bradley "Smitty" Smith	CBS	
2026 (53rd)	Lawrence Saint-Victor	The Bold and the Beautiful	Carter Walton	CBS	

== Performers with multiple wins ==
The following individuals received two or more wins in this category:

4 wins

- Justin Deas

3 wins

- Jonathan Jackson

2 wins

- Steve Burton
- Max Gail
- Robert Gossett
- Jerry verDorn
- Rick Hearst
- Billy Miller

== Performers with multiple nominations ==
The following individuals received two or more nominations in this category:

7 nominations

- Justin Deas
- Jerry verDorn

6 nominations

- Rick Hearst
- Bryton James
- Kristoff St. John
- Greg Rikaart

5 nominations

- Bradford Anderson
- Steve Burton
- Ian Buchanan
- David Lewis

4 nominations

- Bernard Barrow
- Jonathan Jackson
- Christian LeBlanc

3 nominations

- Jeff Branson
- Thom Christopher
- Scott Clifton
- Chad Duell
- Trent Dawson
- Josh Duhamel
- Louis Edmonds
- Al Freeman Jr.
- Benjamin Hendrickson
- Brian Kerwin
- Michael E. Knight
- Billy Miller
- Kin Shriner
- James Patrick Stuart
- Jacob Young
- Dominic Zamprogna

2 nominations

- Grant Aleksander
- Gerald Anthony
- Sean Blakemore
- Tyler Christopher
- Stuart Damon
- David Forsyth
- Max Gail
- Larry Gates
- Michael Graziadei
- Ron Hale
- Roger Howarth
- Charles Keating
- Jeff Kober
- Wally Kurth
- Mike Manning
- Gregg Marx
- Cameron Mathison
- Chandler Massey
- Eric Martsolf
- Ron Raines
- Quinn Redeker
- Scott Reeves
- James Reynolds
- Jason Thompson
- Darnell Williams

== Series with most awards ==
17 wins

- General Hospital

8 wins

- The Young and the Restless

6 wins

- Guiding Light

5 wins

- All My Children

4 wins

- As the World Turns

3 wins

- Santa Barbara

2 wins

- The Bold and the Beautiful
- Days of our Lives
