= Marco Dane =

- One Life to Live character
- Portrayed by: Gerald Anthony (1977–1993); Justin Deas (1985)
- Duration: 1977–1986; 1989–1990; 1992–1993
- First appearance: March 22, 1977
- Last appearance: December 24, 1993
- Created by: Gordon Russell
- Introduced by: Doris Quinlan; Paul Rauch (1989); Wendy Riche (1992)
- Crossover appearances: General Hospital
In-universe information
- Other names: Marco Corelli; Dr. Mario Corelli
- Occupation: Businessman; Con man; Pimp
- Siblings: Mario Corelli; Garibaldi Corelli
- Spouse: Edwina Lewis (1980–1981, 1983–198?)
- First cousins: Alex Crown; Rob Coronal

Marco Dane is a fictional character from the American soap opera One Life to Live. The role was played by actor Gerald Anthony from its debut in 1977 through 1986, and from May 17, 1989, until 1990. Anthony crossed over in the role on sister soap opera General Hospital on September 2, 1992 as Marco, remaining in the role through December 24, 1993.

== Storylines ==
=== 1977–1990 ===
In 1977, Karen Wolek (Kathryn Breech), fiancée to Llanview Hospital chief of staff Dr. Larry Wolek (Michael Storm), is planning for her impending nuptials when ex-boyfriend Marco Dane arrives in Llanview. Fearful that Larry would not marry her if he were to learn about the confidence tricks and embezzlement schemes she participated in with Marco before her arrival in town, she's agitated at Marco's presence. Karen and Larry marry without Marco divulging Karen's secret past, while Marco planned to blackmail her into another business venture instead. In search for employment, Dorian Lord (Claire Malis) hires Marco as a personal assistant, briefly engaging in a romantic affair with him.

Marco (Anthony) and Karen (Light), 1978

Marco engages in constant schadenfreude in Karen's anxiety over the possibility of the con man telling Larry of all the sordid details of their prior criminal behavior. With the introduction of actress Judith Light in the role of Karen in late 1977, head writer Gordon Russell ramps up the storyline into Marco and Karen's relationship, with the role of Karen becoming a jangled bundle of nerves around Anthony's Marco. With the arrival of the goddaughter of Victoria "Viki" Lord Riley (Erika Slezak), Tina Clayton (Andrea Evans), Marco opens up a brothel while masquerading it as a photography studio. Finally establishing a business venture in Llanview, Marco forces Karen (Light, onward) to become one of his prostitutes in exchange for his silence on their past dealings. After Marco takes clothed photographs of naive, teenaged Tina, he edits the images to make them appear as if Tina posed nude. When Marco publishes the photos of Tina, a livid Viki confronts a nonchalant Marco who concedes to none of Viki's accusations.

Newspaper publisher Viki proceeds with a pursuing an exposé in her family newspaper, The Banner, about Dane's doings. While investigating Marco, Viki starts to suspect Karen of cuckolding her former brother-in-law Larry in multiple extramarital affairs. Growing stressed at keeping the secret of her sexual exploits to herself, when Viki confronted Karen with her suspicions, Karen admits to the affairs and divulges her forced prostitution by Marco to Viki. Simultaneously empathetic to Karen's plight and livid with Marco's lurid behaviors, Viki proceeded to share and publish the story of Marco's business dealings with the help of her husband and editor-in-chief, Joe Riley (Lee Patterson). Before the story could be published, Marco finds the murdered corpse of his brother, Dr. Mario Corelli (Anthony). Marco soon devises a plan to assume the identity of his dead brother in an effort to frame Viki for his apparent murder.

Known for her recurrent bouts with multiple personalities (most notably, "Niki Smith"), Viki's apparent motive of revenge for the damaged reputations of her dear Tina and close friend Karen leads Llanview Police Lieutenant Ed Hall (Al Freeman, Jr.) to arrest the town heroine. Viki is later indicted and charged with the murder of Marco, unbeknownst to anyone Marco had an identical twin brother. When Viki is put on trial for the murder of Marco, Llanview District Attorney Herb Callison (Anthony Call) brings surprise witness "Dr. Mario Corelli" (Marco masquerading as his dead brother) to the witness stand. "Mario" then presents forged letters of threats from Viki to Marco as evidence. Karen convinces her friend and fellow prostitute Katrina Karr (Nancy Snyder) as to the true identity of Marco's murderer, and Katrina directs Karen to a post office box with a letter about the killer. Upon arrival to the post office to retrieve the letter uncovering Marco's murderer, the letter is mysteriously lost and Katrina subsequently hit by a car, resulting in Katrina going into a coma. After a month of trial, Katrina recovers and testifies that Karen's extramarital lover, Talbot Huddleston (Byron Sanders), was Marco's murderer, exonerating Viki at the eleventh hour.

As the 1980s begin, Karen is raped by Brad Vernon (Steve Fletcher), the husband of her younger sister Jenny Wolek Vernon (Brynn Thayer), and confided in Marco (as Mario) as to the apparent assault. Upon learning of her husband's rape of her sister, the pregnant Jenny went into premature labor as Katrina Karr was in-hospital giving birth to her own child. Marco and Karen, now friends again, went about switching the sickly-and-soon-dead body of Karen's niece with the live-born child of Katrina (Kristine Karr) when Karen goes into visit the nursery of newborn children. A distraught Katrina falls into a deep depression while the elated Jenny reveled in being a new mother.

Emotionally disturbed with leading a double life, Marco (continuing to pretend to be Mario) suffers a bout of selective amnesia, which prompts Karen to commit Marco into a sanatorium. After being released from the sanitarium, he courts and engages to marry Banner reporter Edwina Lewis (Margaret Klenck). Before the wedding ceremony can be completed, Dorian (Robin Strasser onward) reports to the Llanview police that Mario Corelli was Marco Dane. Marco, his identity revealed, is arrested for identity fraud, incarcerated in Statesville prison, and Edwina proceeded to break off their engagement. After his release from prison, though, Edwina and Marco reconcile and marry.

Apparently reformed from his criminal ways, partners-in-crime Marco and Karen learns that Tina's (adoptive) father, Ted Clayton, is attempting to swindle the Lord family fortune from Viki. The two devise a plan to foil Ted's plot, much to the chagrin of an out of the loop Edwina, who tells the secretive Marco to move out of their apartment. Marco is later shot in a confrontation with Ted, who is shot dead by Llanview Police Commissioner Ed Hall. As this storyline reaches a dénouement, Edwina enacts divorce proceedings with Marco and the switched baby is returned to Katrina Karr (Nancy Snyder) following the discovering.

Unable to sever ties with Edwina, Marco engages in a love triangle between his ex-wife and new romance and sister of Jenny's ex-husband, Samantha Vernon. Edwina and Marco remarry but breakup and divorce yet again when ambitious Edwina leaves Llanview in pursuit of career opportunities. After a series of other exploits involving Viki, Echo DiSavoy (Kim Zimmer), and Clint Buchanan (Clint Ritchie), Marco eventually leaves Llanview in 1986. He returned in 1989, meeting Viki's daughter, actress and multiple-personality sufferer Megan Gordon (Jessica Tuck), masquerading as alter-ego "Ruby Bright". Clint, shadowing his sick stepdaughter, uncovers Marco courting Ruby. Clint divulges to Marco that Ruby was a figment of Megan's personality and the two collaborated in causing Megan to reemerge from her latest bout of mental illness. Marco departs Llanview in 1990 after serving as Megan's manager.

=== 1992–1993 ===
Now a private investigator, Marco arrives in Port Charles in 1992, much to the intriguing delight of heiress Tracy Quartermaine Hornsby (Jane Elliot), who was in the middle of marital woes. Tracy engaged in an extramarital romance while hiring Marco to investigate the mistress of her husband, Jenny Eckert (Cheryl Richardson), a distant cousin of Luke Spencer (Anthony Geary). Marco, as a side venture, becomes a boxing promoter managing high school student Jagger Cates (Antonio Sabàto, Jr.). Jagger, who was dating at the time Brenda Barrett (Vanessa Marcil), had an obvious romantic attraction to classmate Karen Wexler, much to the displeasure of Brenda.

Karen makes advances at Jagger which go unrequited, for which she reacts badly. Going into a bout of depression, Karen begins taking drugs and working at the Paradise Club strip club, owned by Sonny Corinthos (Maurice Benard). When Jagger discovers Karen and Sonny in bed together and learns she had been stripping and abusing drugs, boxer Jagger engages in an altercation which leaves Sonny greatly injured. An incensed Sonny puts a hit out on Jagger in retaliation, only to put the plan on indefinite hold at the insistence of Marco, who urges him to cancel the planned killing in return for a cut of Jagger's boxing winnings.

Marco nearly persuaded Tracy to run off with him with a large cut of Quartermaine money but she left him with blank paper and went alone.

Marco worked briefly for Frank Smith along with Luke Spencer and Sonny Corinthos and helped them break Frank Smith out of prison.

== Casting and reception ==
Following Anthony's introduction as a day player by head writer Gordon Russell, his Marco soon became one of the soap opera genre's first leading anti-heroes. Regarded as "daytime's answer to Al Pacino," Marco Dane became a leading fixture on OLTL alongside central characters Victoria Lord (Slezak) and Dr. Larry Wolek (Storm), and is credited, in part, for the show's critical acclaim and ratings successes from late 1970s and into the 1980s.

In 1992, GH executive producer Wendy Riche introduced the role on the fellow ABC serial; Anthony earned his second nomination and first Daytime Emmy Award win for Outstanding Supporting Actor for the latter portrayal in 1993 (his first being in the same category for the role on OLTL in 1982), becoming to the first actor to win an Emmy for a crossover role.
