= Jerry verDorn =

American soap opera actor (1949–2022)

- Born: November 23, 1949; Sioux Falls, South Dakota, U.S.
- Died: May 1, 2022 (aged 72); Sparta, New Jersey, U.S.
- Education: Minnesota State University Moorhead
- Occupation: Actor
- Years active: 1979–2019
- Spouse: Bethea Stewart (m. 1977)
- Children: 2

Jerry verDorn (November 23, 1949 – May 1, 2022) was an American soap opera actor, best known for his role as Ross Marler in Guiding Light and Clint Buchanan in One Life to Live.

== Early life ==
Jerry verDorn was born on November 23, 1949, in Sioux Falls, South Dakota, and attended Minnesota State University Moorhead.

== Career ==
VerDorn performed on stage with the Folger Theatre in Washington, D.C. On Broadway he was a standby for the role of John Tanner in Man and Superman (1978) and portrayed an investigator in Are You Now or Have You Ever Been (1979).

VerDorn became one of Guiding Light's longest-running cast members, debuting in the role on March 19, 1979 and portraying the character of Ross for over 26 years. He won Daytime Emmy Awards for Best Supporting Actor in 1995 and again in 1996. VerDorn also portrayed Ross in a 1983 television movie, The Cradle Will Fall, an adaptation of a book to film using several Guiding Light characters in supporting roles. In the winter of 1982, he played the role of Ross' soon to be first wife, Carrie Todd's (played by Jane Elliot), first husband Todd MacKenzie in Carrie's flashbacks during Carrie's murder trial of one of Ross' former nemeses, Diane Ballard (played by Sofia Landon Geier) who also appeared in the flashbacks. In the fall of 1994, he played the humorous lookalike role of Howie - "Hoss" - who was the total antithesis of Ross. His last appearance as Ross aired on October 11, 2005.

VerDorn earned seven nominations for the Daytime Emmy Award for Outstanding Supporting Actor in a Drama Series in 1990, 1991, 1992, 1994, 1995, 1996 and 1999 and won twice (1995 and 1996).

On October 25, 2005, verDorn took over the role of Clint Buchanan on ABC's One Life to Live and continued in the role until the series cancellation in 2012. On January 8, 2013, verDorn became the first actor to sign on for the revival of One Life to Live that aired on The Online Network.

== Filmography ==
=== Television ===
Year	Title	Role	Notes
1979-2005	Guiding Light	Ross Marler (1979-2005); Todd MacKenzie (1982)	Daytime serial (contract role); Daytime serial (dual role) For Daytime Emmy info, see Awards and nominations section below for details
1983	The Cradle Will Fall	Ross Marler	Television movie (CBS)
2005–2012 (shown on ABC) 2013 (revival shown on Hulu Channel)	One Life to Live	Clinton "Clint" Buchanan #2	Daytime serial @ ABC (contract role @ 545 episodes); Daytime serial @ Hulu (contract role @ 40 episodes)
2019	Venice: The Series	J	Episode: "One"

== Awards and nominations ==
Year	Award	Category	Work	Result
1990	Daytime Emmy Award	Outstanding Supporting Actor in a Drama Series	Guiding Light	Nominated
1991	Daytime Emmy Award	Outstanding Supporting Actor in a Drama Series	Guiding Light	Nominated
1992	Daytime Emmy Award	Outstanding Supporting Actor in a Drama Series	Guiding Light	Nominated
1994	Daytime Emmy Award	Outstanding Supporting Actor in a Drama Series	Guiding Light	Nominated
1995	Daytime Emmy Award	Outstanding Supporting Actor in a Drama Series	Guiding Light	Won
1996	Daytime Emmy Award	Outstanding Supporting Actor in a Drama Series	Guiding Light	Won
1999	Daytime Emmy Award	Outstanding Supporting Actor in a Drama Series	Guiding Light	Nominated

== Personal life ==
In 1977, verDorn married Bethea Stewart. They had two sons and remained wed until his death. He died on May 1, 2022, aged 72, from cancer.
