= Justin Deas =

American actor (born 1948)

- Born: March 30, 1948 (age 78); Connellsville, Pennsylvania, U.S.
- Education: College of William & Mary
- Occupation: Actor
- Spouses: Jody Catlin (m. 1967–1980) Margaret Colin (m. 1988)
- Children: 3

Justin Deas (born March 30, 1948, in Connellsville, Pennsylvania) is an American actor. He is known primarily for his work on daytime soap operas.

== Personal life ==
Deas received his Bachelor of Arts from the College of William & Mary. Deas married actress Margaret Colin (who played his onscreen wife on As the World Turns) in 1988; the couple has two sons. He has a daughter, Yvette Deas, with Jody Catlin.

== Career ==
Deas' first daytime role was as Bucky on Ryan's Hope. He was the tenth actor to play the role of Tom Hughes on As the World Turns. He also played Keith Timmons on Santa Barbara, and Buzz Cooper on Guiding Light. He held the record for most Daytime Emmy Awards in the acting categories, winning six Emmys – (once for As the World Turns, twice for Santa Barbara and three times for Guiding Light) until 2012 when Anthony Geary won a seventh award in the same category.

== Filmography ==
- 1975–1978: Ryan's Hope as Dr. Bucky Carter (255 episodes)
- 1980s: One Life to Live as Marco Dane (Temporary replacement for Gerald Anthony)
- 1981–1984: As the World Turns as Tom Hughes #10 (Role: December 1980 to April 13, 1984)
- 1985: Tales from the Darkside as Heat Jones (1 episode) in "False Prophet"
- 1986: Dream Lover as Kevin McCann
- 1986: Foley Square as N/A (1 episode)
- 1986: Intimate Strangers as Brad Bierston
- 1986–1988: Santa Barbara as Keith Timmons (Role: May 30, 1986 to November 17, 1988)
- 1987: Cameo by Night as Detective Bellflower
- 1987: A Stranger Waits as Mike Webber
- 1987: U.S. Marshals: Waco & Rhinehart as Milo Rhinehart
- 1989: Studio 5-B as Jake Gallagher
- 1990: Montana as Clyde
- 1990: The Loves of Emma Bardac as Narrator (voice)
- 1992: Szuler as Rudolf "Rudy" de Seve
- 1993–2009: Guiding Light as Buzz Cooper (Role: February 5, 1993 – September 18, 2009)
- 2010: An Affirmative Act as Governor Packer Winstroll
