= Trent Dawson =

American actor

- Born: February 4, 1971 (age 54); Baton Rouge, Louisiana, United States
- Occupation: Actor
- Spouse: Sharron Kearney (m. 2012)

Trent Ashley Dawson (born February 4, 1971) is an American actor, best known for his role as Henry Coleman on the soap opera As the World Turns.

== Career ==
Dawson was hired to play Henry Coleman on As the World Turns for just a few days in 1999, but positive fan reaction to his character extended this first to several months, and finally an indefinite stay on the venerable soap. In 2005, the show finally signed him to a contract and Dawson was nominated for several Emmys thereafter. After As the World Turns ended in 2010, he went on to guest star in a variety of popular television shows including The Good Wife, NCIS: Los Angeles, and Homeland. He also has enjoyed a prolific stage career both on and off-Broadway, where he has played a wide range of characters. In 2016 Dawson joined the cast of General Hospital in the recurring role of Huxley Lynch.

== Charity work ==
Dawson traveled to his native Louisiana to help Habitat for Humanity rebuild houses after Hurricane Katrina.

== Personal life ==
Dawson married Sharron Kearney on October 13, 2012.
