= Gerald Anthony =

American actor (1951–2004)

- Born: Gerald Anthony Bucciarelli; July 31, 1951; Pittsburgh, Pennsylvania, U.S.
- Died: May 28, 2004 (aged 52); Butler, New Jersey, U.S.
- Resting place: Calvary Catholic Cemetery, Pittsburgh, Pennsylvania, U.S.
- Occupation: Actor
- Years active: 1977–2004
- Spouse: Brynn Thayer (m. 1981; div. 1983)

Gerald Anthony Bucciarelli (July 31, 1951 – May 28, 2004) was an American actor.

== Life and career ==
Anthony was born Gerald Anthony Bucciarelli, the son of Italian immigrants had roles and appearances on many shows such as Another World and L.A. Law.

He may be best-remembered for his role as Marco Dane on the ABC soap opera, One Life to Live, a role he played from 1977–86 and 1989–90, and on fellow ABC serial General Hospital in 1992.

Marco arrived in Llanview as a low-life pimp and pornographer who was only supposed to last for 8 days, but Anthony's offbeat look as well as his impassioned performances and electric chemistry with co-star Judith Light (Karen Wolek) made him such a fan favorite that only a few months after producers killed off Marco in 1978 they revealed the real victim was Marco's heretofore unknown brother, Mario Corelli. Anthony was nominated for a Daytime Emmy Award for the role in 1982, and won for Marco on General Hospital in 1993.

During his absences from daytime, Anthony had many guest-starring roles on television and a recurring role as kind-hearted Father Pete Terranova on Wiseguy from 1988–89. Anthony also directed an independent film, Twisted, and episodes of All My Children.

He continued to appear sporadically in primetime; in early 2003, he played a bit part on As the World Turns; when asked why he had not returned to daytime sooner, he said "no one asked me."

== Marriage ==
Anthony was married to his One Life to Live co-star Brynn Thayer from 1981 to 1983.

== Death ==
Anthony died by suicide on May 28, 2004, at age 52 in Butler, New Jersey.

== Filmography ==
=== Filmography ===
| Year | Title | Role | Notes |
|---|---|---|---|
| 1989 | The Secret of the Ice Cave | Geiger | |
| 1991 | Crackdown a/k/a To Die Standing | Thurmond | |
| 1994 | The Force | Nick | Direct to video |
| 1997 | Stag | Ed Labenski | |
| 2004 | She Hate Me | Mr. Jennings | (final film role) |

=== Television ===
| Year | Title | Role | Notes |
|---|---|---|---|
| 1977–1986; 1989–1990 | One Life to Live | Marco Dane | Daytime serial (contract role) From 1992–1993, the character crossed over to sister soap General Hospital For Daytime Emmy info, see Awards and nominations section below for details |
| 1977–1986; 1989–1990 | One Life to Live | Dr. Mario Corelli (twin brother) | Daytime serial (dual roles @ 1978) |
| 1982 | Family Feud | Celebrity contestant (3 episodes) | Episode: "Love in the Afternoon Super Feud Special - General Hospital vs One Life to Live: Game 1"; Episode: "Saints vs. Sinners Special: Game 1"; Episode: "Saints vs. Sinners Special: Game 4" |
| 1987–1989 | Wiseguy | Father Peter Terranova | Episode: "Pilot" (1987); Episode" "The Loose Cannon" (1987); Episode: "The Birthday Surprise" (1987); Episode: "The Prodigal Son" (1987); Episode: "Last Rites for Lucci" (1987); Episode: "Going Home" (1988); Episode: "White Noise" (1989) |
| 1988 | Moonlighting | Anthony Baxter | Episode: "Eek! A Spouse!" |
| 1988–1989 | L. A. Law | Ross Burnett | Episode: "Dummy Dearest" (1988); Episode" "To Live and Diet in L.A." (1989); Episode: "Victor/Victorious" (1989); Episode: "The Unbearable Lightness of Boring" (1989); Episode: "His Suit is Hirsute" (1989) |
| 1989 | MacGyver | Snakeskin | Episode: "Runners" |
| 1989 | Christine Cromwell | Victor Barron | Episode: "Easy Come, Easy Go" |
| 1990 | Jake and the Fatman | Tommy Malone | Episode: "I Know That You Know" |
| 1991–1992 | Another World | Rick Madison | Daytime serial (recurring role) |
| 1992–1993 | General Hospital | Marco Dane | Daytime serial (contract role) From 1977–1986, 1989–1990, and 1994-1999, the character originally appeared on sister soap One Life to Live For Daytime Emmy info, see Awards and nominations section below for details |
| 1994 | The Cosby Mysteries | Unknown role | Episode: "One Day at a Time" |
| 1999 | Law & Order | Mario | Episode: "Empire" |
| 1999 | Third Watch | Owner | Episode: "History of the World" |
| 2003 | As the World Turns | Richie | Daytime serial (guest role); Episode: #11949" and Episode: "11950"; Final daytime serial role |

== Awards and nominations ==
In 1982 Anthony was nominated for a Daytime Emmy Award for the role of Marco Dane on One Life to Live. In 1993 he won a Daytime Emmy Award for the role of Marco Dane but for his portrayal of the character on One Life to Live's sister soap General Hospital.

| Year | Award | Category | Work | Result |
|---|---|---|---|---|
| 1982 | Daytime Emmy Award | Outstanding Supporting Actor in a Drama Series | One Life to Live | Nominated |
| 1993 | Daytime Emmy Award | Outstanding Supporting Actor in a Drama Series | General Hospital | Won |
