= Langley Wallingford =

- All My Children character
- Portrayed by: Louis Edmonds
- Duration: 1979–1995
- First appearance: 1979
- Last appearance: December 22, 1995
In-universe information
- Other names: Lenny Wlasuk; Leslie Wilson
- Occupation: Professor
- Spouse: Betty Wilson (pre-1979); Phoebe Tyler Wallingford (1980–1986, 1987–200?)
- Daughters: Verla Grubbs; Hillary Wilson
- Grandsons: Damon Miller

Langley Wallingford is a fictional character from the American soap opera All My Children. He was played by Louis Edmonds from 1979 until December 1995.

== History ==
Langley Wallingford, a reformed con artist and criminal who was acquainted with Myrtle Lum Fargate in her carney days—via purse snatching. He got wind that newly divorcee Phoebe Tyler was a rich old bird in Pine Valley and ripe for plucking. Langley then made his way to town and incidentally stopped by the boutique and ducked when he saw the owner—Myrtle. Knowing she would blow his scam he quickly hurried out of the boutique without the gift he planned to purchase for Phoebe.

Ms. Valentine, Phoebe's maid, got wind from Myrtle of Langley's was posing as a distinguished professor and was penniless. She planned to inform her boss of Langley's dirty deeds, but was held off by Langley. Langley and Phoebe wed in 1980 and were lovebirds for a while. That is until 1986.

Another fast talking Cassanova, Wade Matthews, was in the picture and planned to bilk Phoebe out of her fortune just as Langley originally had planned before he fell in love with her. Wade had sabotaged Langley and Phoebe's marriage and talked a liquored up Phoebe into marrying him in the Caribbean.

Wade put his evil plan in motion to kill Phoebe for the hefty insurance policy. The plot took a bizarre twist when Wade's lover Shelly took a tumble down a flight of stairs and Phoebe was thrown in jail for attempted murder. Langley was determined to save his precious Phoebe at all costs. Langley donned a wig and dress disguised as Phoebe, pried a confession out of the unsuspecting Wade while holding a gun. Upon returning home, Langley and Phoebe reunited.

In 1995, Langley's elder daughter, Verla Grubbs (Carol Burnett), came back to Pine Valley to seeking Langley's blessing as she was about to wed. Langley made his final appearance in December 1995, at Pine Valley Hospital where he was helping put up Christmas decorations in the halls.

Langley remained in Pine Valley for a while, but due to Louis Edmonds's health problems, he was written out of the show in April 1997 as being in Egypt on archeological digs. When Edmonds died in 2001, the writers chose to not have Langley die, but rather have him become an unseen character. He was last mentioned in a current context in August 2002, when he missed Brooke's wedding because he was on business in South Africa.

When Phoebe died in 2005, Brooke said that Phoebe's last words were "Langley is waiting for me." This confirmed that sometime between August 2002 and May 2005, Langley died.
