= List of Falcon Crest episodes =

The following is the list of episodes from the American prime time television soap opera Falcon Crest, which aired for nine seasons on CBS from December 4, 1981 to May 17, 1990. Total of 227 episodes.

== Series overview ==
Season	Episodes	Originally released	
Season	Episodes	First released	Last released
1	18	December 4, 1981	April 16, 1982
2	22	October 1, 1982	March 11, 1983
3	28	September 30, 1983	May 18, 1984
4	30	September 28, 1984	May 24, 1985
5	29	October 4, 1985	May 22, 1986
6	28	October 3, 1986	May 15, 1987
7	28	October 2, 1987	May 6, 1988
8	22	October 28, 1988	May 19, 1989
9	22	September 29, 1989	May 17, 1990

== Episodes ==
=== Original pilot ===
Title	Directed by	Written by	Original release date
"The Vintage Years"	Alexander Singer	Earl Hamner	UNAIRED

=== Season 1 (1981–82) ===
No. overall	No. in season	Title	Directed by	Written by	Original release date	Prod. code	Rating/share (households)
1	1	"In His Father's House"	Michael Preece	Robert McCullough	December 4, 1981	189701	21.8/38
At Falcon Crest's winery, co-owner Jason Gioberti (Harry Townes) interferes in a nightly tryst between his niece Emma (Margaret Ladd) and field-hand Turner Bates, leading to Jason accidentally falling to his death. Emma's mother, Falcon Crest co-owner Angela Channing (Jane Wyman), covers up the facts around her brother's demise since a suspicious death would jeopardize the unity of Falcon Crest. Jason's son Chase (Robert Foxworth) and his wife Maggie (Susan Sullivan) arrive from New York to attend the funeral. In New York City, Chase's son Cole (William R. Moses) is arrested after assaulting his sister's lover. Recalling his childhood, Chase decides to reunite his family by relocating to Tuscany Valley. Much to Angela's chagrin, he also wants to work the small vineyard inherited from his father rather than sell it to Angela. Chase forms a friendship with Gus Nunouz, Jason's Latino vineyard manager, and his family.
2	2	"A Time for Saboteurs"	Michael Preece	Sandra Kay Siegel	December 11, 1981	189704	20.1/34
Paul Salinger, Chase's old flying buddy, visits Falcon Crest. The two reminisce about their time in the Vietnam War. Paul charms Angela's daughter Julia (Abby Dalton) and tries to persuade Chase to start a flying business together, actually intending to use the money to cover his gambling debts. He also reaches an arrangement with Angela, who promises to back him financially if he can get Chase to leave Tuscany Valley. After his attempt to sabotage Chase's vineyard fails, Paul flees the valley again.
3	3	"The Tangled Vines"	Jack Bender	E.F. Wallengren	December 18, 1981	189702	19.0/34
Owing $50,000 in property taxes, Chase is in financial trouble. He attempts to sell his harvest in advance, but Angela only wants to buy at a retail price, frightens rival purchasers of Chase's grapes away, and pressures the local bank into denying Chase credit. Eventually, the Giobertis sell their house in New York to stay afloat.
4	4	"The Harvest"	Michael Preece	Earl Hamner Jr.	December 25, 1981	189703	15.7/32
Angela is upset with her grandson (and heir) Lance Cumson (Lorenzo Lamas), whose irresponsible behaviour gets out of hand. He blows up Chase's pump house and interferes with the blossoming romance between Chase's daughter Vickie (Jamie Rose) and picker Mario Nunouz (Mario Marcelino), starting a bar fight and injuring Mario. Angela decides to teach him a lesson by grooming Chase’s son Cole as a potential heir, showering him with favours. This causes a rift between Cole and his father. Hiding from the police, Lance receives money from his mother. With the money, Lance pays off Chase's picking crew and reports to Angela. Overhearing this, Cole informs his father, who shames Angela into letting the picking crew return to Chase. This plot of this episode was the basis for the pilot of The Vintage Years.
5	5	"Tony Comes Home"	Jack Bender	Katharyn Michaelian Powers	January 1, 1982	189705	23.8/39
After twelve years of absence, Julia's husband Tony Cumson (John Saxon) returns to Falcon Crest. At first rebuffed by Julia, Tony finally wins her over. Lance remains hostile to his father. Julia and Tony's plans to start a new life away from Falcon Crest are thwarted by Angela. Tony, unable to live at Falcon Crest, leaves without Julia. At the same time, Maggie takes a job in San Francisco as a reporter at The Globe, the newspaper run by Angela's ex-husband, Douglas Channing (Stephen Elliott). Though relishing the challenge, Maggie finally settles for a lesser reporting job at a local newspaper.
6	6	"Kindred Spirits"	Jack Bender	Judy Merl & Paul Eric Myers	January 8, 1982	189707	22.6/38
Chase and Cole accompany Lance on a trip to examine a remote piece of property that Angela is contemplating buying. Cole is injured in a riding accident. Chase stays with Cole while Lance organises a rescue team. Meanwhile, Emma's mental health is not improving, but Angela refuses any treatment. Emma runs away from home, afraid of being sent to a clinic. Emma's worried father, Douglas Channing, stays by Angela's side until Emma is found. Vickie discovers Emma hiding in an old springhouse and befriends her, persuading her to return home.
7	7	"The Extortionist"	Michael Preece	Garner Simmons	January 15, 1982	189706	21.5/36
Emma's lover, Turner Bates, seeks Emma to learn what happened after he ran from the scene on the night of Jason's death, but Angela throws him out. At night Turner sneaks back and steals away with Emma. Unable to obtain straight answers from Emma, Turner tries to blackmail Angela, who calls in the police. A car chase ends in a crash. Chase and Lance pull Emma out and save her, but Turner is killed in an explosion. When Maggie says that she may be pregnant, the Giobertis try to cope with the effects that it would cause.
8	8	"Lord of the Manor"	Jeffrey Hayden	E.F. Wallengren	January 22, 1982	189709	23.6/39
When Angela takes Cole to Rome to attend an important wine-tasting competition, she is surprised by her ex-husband Douglas, who hopes to rekindle their honeymoon spent there years ago. Despite mutual feelings, Angela refuses his proposal to remarry. Meanwhile, Cole visits the Gioberti hometown in Tuscany and is given a collection of Italian letters, which reveal the enduring bitterness between Angela and Jason. Lance, left in charge of Falcon Crest, has to deal with an unscrupulous wine salesman and gets entangled in his own machinations.
9	9	"Dark Journey"	Joseph Manduke	Katharyn Michaelian Powers	January 29, 1982	189710	20.3/34
Vickie runs away from her overprotective parents to San Francisco. An acquaintance of Lance leads her into the clutches of a pornographic filmmaker, while Chase and Maggie frantically search for their daughter. Angela toys with Douglas's emotions, playing him against a renowned painter and making Douglas look like a fool.
10	10	"Victims"	Harvey Laidman	Gerry Day & Bethel Leslie	February 5, 1982	189712	22.0/39
Maggie's news assignment on vineyard workers’ lifestyles reveal that an extortionist is terrifying Falcon Crest pickers with threats of deportation. Despite Angela's warnings against becoming involved, Chase routs the extortionist. When Emma discovers that she is pregnant with Turner Bates's child, Lance sees his position as heir to Falcon Crest threatened. Emma's reliving of the events surrounding Jason's death ends in her having a miscarriage. Angela blames Lance, who protests his innocence.
11	11	"For Love or Money"	Fernando Lamas	Kathleen Hite	February 12, 1982	189715	21.2/39
After a bitter argument with Angela regarding plans for him to marry Melissa Agretti (Dolores Cantu), the wine empire heiress, Lance leaves in a fury. After he nearly runs over a girl, he falls in love with her and decides to move to San Francisco to be close to the girl. However, when Angela attempts to stop him, Lance succumbs and leaves the love of his life. In an old room that Jason had walled up, Chase finds some writings, which lead him to believe that Angela may have been involved in crippling a girl forty years ago. Confronted with the evidence, Angela turns the tables on Chase, playing a small excerpt of a recording that leaves Chase believing that his father hated him.
12	12	"Family Reunion"	Larry Elikann	Robert McCullough	February 19, 1982	189717	25.2/43
Chase's wealthy mother, Jacqueline Perrault (Lana Turner), mysteriously returns to Falcon Crest. When Jacqueline warns Chase of Angela's treacherous nature and tries to persuade him to leave Falcon Crest, hatred erupts, and Jacqueline argues with Angela and Chase. However, through their conflict, the mother-and-son relationship is strengthened; Jacqueline is convinced that Chase will survive and prosper in the valley.
13	13	"The Candidate"	Ernest Pintoff	Story by : E.F. Wallengren & Robert McCullough and Mary Ann Kasica & Michael Scheff; Teleplay by : E.F. Wallengren & Robert McCullough	February 26, 1982	189720	22.2/40
Ed McKay, a member of the County Board of Supervisors, is assassinated by a vineyardist ruined by Angela's virtual monopoly of the water rights. Chase is encouraged to run for the office and begins campaigning for a more even-handed solution in the valley, while Angela does everything to see Chase defeated. When the assassin arrives at Falcon Crest and takes Angela hostage, Chase defuses the situation. Eventually, Chase wins the election. After Emma is caught shoplifting in a jewelry store, Angela threatens the owner that she will destroy him if he decides to prosecute.
14	14	"House of Cards"	Larry Elikann	Michael Halperin	March 12, 1982	189718	19.9/36
Trying to assert his independence, Lance finds work at his grandfather's newspaper difficult. Angela is still determined to have Lance marry Melissa Agretti (Ana Alicia), who is involved with several men, including Cole. Chase and Maggie, concerned about Emma's instability, persuade Julia to take her sister to a psychiatric clinic. When Angela finds out, she tells Julia that Emma "murdered Uncle Jason", which persuades Julia to keep Emma at home. At the same time, Chase uses his influence as a county supervisor to discover the real cause of his father's death. Ana Alicia takes over the role of Melissa Agretti from Delores Cantú for the remainder of the series.
15	15	"Heir Apparent"	Harry Harris	Kathleen Hite	March 19, 1982	189721	19.9/33
Chase inquires into the circumstances surrounding his father's death. In an attempt to foil Chase, Angela has Philip mislead him into believing he might inherit Falcon Crest but finds him interested more in the truth than the inheritance. Following a party at the Giobertis’, a friend of Cole's is killed in a drunk-driving crash, for which Cole blames himself. Angela attempts to force Lance to marry Melissa, who has become deeply involved with Cole. Melissa learns that she is pregnant but tells no one.
16	16	"The Good, the Bad and the Profane"	Bill Duke	E.F. Wallengren & Robert McCullough	April 2, 1982	189724	22.2/39
Pressured by Angela, Lance finally proposes to Melissa, expecting his proposal to be rejected. When she surprisingly accepts his offer, Lance is forced to go through with the wedding. After the ceremony, Lance finds out that Melissa is pregnant by another man. Cole fumes about the arrangement, but Melissa assures him that her marriage to Lance won't interfere with their relationship. At the same time, Vickie and Mario elope but eventually change their minds about marrying.
17	17	"Penultimate Questions"	Alan J. Levi	Robert McCullough	April 9, 1982	189711	22.0/39
Lance and Melissa cut their disastrous honeymoon short and return to Falcon Crest, where Angela learns of Melissa's pregnancy and assumes Lance to be the father, despite his denial. Meanwhile, Chase gathers enough evidence to ask the D.A. to open a coroner's inquest into Jason's death. While Angela attempts to impede this, she is forced to testify. Following his release from the hospital, Douglas escorts Emma to the inquest. However, before she can testify, Douglas suffers a fatal heart attack.
18	18	"Ultimate Answers"	Michael Preece	Robert McCullough	April 16, 1982	189725	21.4/38
After Douglas's burial, the inquest resumes. The D.A. makes a circumstantial case on irregularities around Jason's death but lacks definite evidence without Emma's testimony. Angela tries to keep her younger daughter sedated to prevent her from testifying, but Emma slips away and arrives to take the stand, confessing how she accidentally pushed Jason to his death while he fought with Turner Bates. The jury rules that Jason "died at the hands of another", thereby giving Chase control of Falcon Crest, but he magnanimously offers fifty percent of the vineyard to Angela. Angela has no choice and accepts. Meanwhile, it is revealed that Douglas left fifty percent of The Globe, to his illegitimate son Richard.

=== Season 2 (1982–83) ===
No. overall	No. in season	Title	Directed by	Written by	Original release date	Prod. code	Rating/share (households)
19	1	"The Challenge"	Harry Harris	Robert McCullough	October 1, 1982	171201	19.3/34
Gus dying in a gas explosion overshadows both Chase taking over half of Falcon Crest, stubbornly resisted by Angela, and Vickie's relationship to Mario. Angela also tries to gain control of The Globe by proxy of her daughters' shares before their half-brother, Richard Channing (David Selby), arrives. In New York, Richard is discussing his move to California with his adoptive father, Henri Denault (E.G. Marshall). Richard wishes to gain his independence from Denault's Company and also find out his mother's identity and promises Denault control of the Californian wine industry. As their marriage deteriorates, Lance refuses to join Melissa in a visit to her father, Carlo Agretti (Carlos Romero). When Cole shows up and demands to know whose child she is carrying, Carlo punches him. David Selby (Richard) and Ana Alicia (Melissa) are added to the opening credits.
20	2	"The Arrival"	Bill Duke	Robert McCullough	October 8, 1982	171202	20.3/37
Chase's concern for an even-handed distribution of water supplies creates conflict within the Board of Supervisors and with Angela. Richard Channing arrives at The Globe, publicly heaps the staff with praises and then fires the editor-in-chief, who was a year short of retirement and pension. Emma buys a used car. Carlo Agretti reveals his knowledge of Richard Channing's sinister connections to his daughter. Carlo also learns of Melissa's marital troubles. At a surprise party held at the Giobertis', he confronts Lance, which results in a fight between the two. In their first meeting, Angela flat-out tells Richard that he does not belong to the family.
21	3	"Troubled Waters"	Harry Harris	Stephen Black & Henry Stern	October 15, 1982	171203	15.9/26
Richard Channing aggressively seeks to buy the Agretti land. During a dinner, he provokes Carlo into splashing wine in his face. Carlo also clashes with Lance and Angela over Lance's disrespect towards Melissa. Chase tries to sell wine to Canada, than another distributor, and Angela agrees. At a session of the Board of Supervisors, Angela claims that the water in Falcon Crest's reservoirs is tainted. The county health inspector confirms this but after pressure from Chase issues another report declaring the water safe. Maggie, working on a screenplay for Hollywood, is suffering from writer's block. Mario and his mother leave the valley, and a devastated Vickie runs home. After another clash with Cole, Carlo surprisingly phones Cole to apologize and invites him over to see Melissa. Unbeknownst to Cole, Carlo did at the point of a gun. When Cole arrives at the Agretti mansion, he finds Carlo dead on the floor. He calls an ambulance but becomes the prime suspect in the process. News of the murder reaches Angela and Melissa during a meeting of The Globe's board of directors.
22	4	"Murder One"	Bill Duke	Irv Pearlburg	October 22, 1982	171204	22.0/40
At the funeral reception for Carlo Agretti, the whole family assembles, including Richard Channing, who approaches Melissa, still wanting to buy the Agretti house. Later, Cole protests his innocence to Melissa, who appears to believe him. In the water-rights issue, Angela tries to pressure County Supervisor Nick Hogan into voting against Chase, indicating that she won't buy $17,000 worth of pipes from him. Hogan votes against his business interests and supports Chase's proposal. Emma secretly leaves Falcon Crest in her car, giving Chase a voting proxy to her 20% share of The Globe. Richard sets The Globe reporters on the Agretti murder case and has an article rewritten in a sensationalist manner. Since Cole's fingerprints are found on the murder weapon, he is arrested for Carlo's murder.
23	5	"The Exposé"	Harry Harris	Garner Simmons	November 5, 1982	171205	19.1/36
Richard declares The New Globe "the champion of the people" and begins by publishing stories prejudging Cole and attacking Falcon Crest for poor working conditions. Chase investigates these conditions and pushes for higher wages and benefits for part-time workers, a policy Angela opposes in private but later publicly supports. Cole is released on bail and gets a part-time job at the vineyard of a widowed mother, Katherine Demery (Joanna Cassidy), leading to a blossoming romance. Vickie takes up jogging and runs into Nick Hogan. Both Angela and a third party - probably Richard - try to locate Emma. Lance takes Melissa to childbirth classes in San Francisco and uses the occasion to spend time with his ex-girlfriend, Lori Stevens.
24	6	"Home Away from Home"	Bill Duke	Kathleen Hite	November 12, 1982	171206	20.4/36
Cole moves in with Katherine, against Maggie's wishes. Richard discovers their relationship and has photographs of Cole and Katherine kissing published. Angela buys remaining Globe shares. Lori wants Lance to come full circle about his relationship with her, but complications in Melissa's pregnancy force him to stay by her side. Chase's mother Jacqueline Perrault returns to support Cole's legal defense. However, a chance meeting with Richard visibly affects her and prompts a sudden departure.
25	7	"The Namesake"	Harry Harris	E.F. Wallengren	November 19, 1982	171207	20.4/37
Richard plans to buy land, ostensibly to build a memorial to his father, but actually wants to turn most of the land into a vineyard. As the land is earmarked for a public park, he has to convince the Board of Supervisors. Chase strongly opposes the plan, but Richards persuades Nick Hogan by having someone blow up his truck and then presenting him with a classic car. Instead of staying with Melissa, Lance goes out riding with Lori. After a heated exchange with Lance, Melissa leaves her prescribed bed rest to win Cole back from Katherine and tells him that he is the baby's father. Cole takes Melissa to the hospital, where she prematurely gives birth to a boy named Joseph. Angela orders Lance to do everything he can to please Melissa. Cole ends his relationship with Katherine and returns home.
26	8	"Choices"	Bill Duke	Leah Markus	November 26, 1982	171208	19.0/31
Newly born Joseph's health is weak. As he is likely to die, he is baptized by Father Bob. Richard hires Tony Cumson to seduce Julia into selling her share in The New Globe. Julia wants to leave Falcon Crest, but a contract signed by Tony convinces her otherwise. Despairing of his chances, Cole leaves home to skip trial but returns. A second autopsy of Carlo Agretti's body clears his name.
27	9	"The Vigil"	Harry Harris	Scott Hamner	December 3, 1982	171209	22.8/39
Maggie and Chase fly to Los Angeles, Chase to look into Falcon Crest's finances and Maggie to meet with producer Darryl Clayton (Bradford Dillman) about her script. Darryl first turns her down but, after Angela secretly approaches him to invest in the movie, he keeps Maggie in Los Angeles, away from her family. A romance blossoms between Chase's daughter Vickie and Nick Hogan, though she finds out that he is married. Richard brings a neonatal specialist in from Europe, who stabilizes baby Joseph's condition. Cole makes a commitment to be a devoted father to Joseph. Richard lays a down payment on a house in Tuscany Valley.
28	10	"Confrontations"	Bill Duke	Dick Nelson	December 10, 1982	171210	20.8/35
Melissa returns to Falcon Crest with Joseph. She is prepared to keep up her "marriage of state", but Lance still aims for a divorce. Cole tells Chase that he is the father of Melissa's baby and asks for a job at Falcon Crest. Phillip has dinner with Amanda Croft (Anne Jeffreys), a middle-aged lady who is curious about Phillip's relationship with Angela. In Malibu, Daryl seduces Maggie into a passionate kiss, but she eventually returns to her family. Angela is still buying up Globe shares. Chase reproaches her for keeping Falcon Crest money in a personal investment fund. Richard informs Angela of his plan to issue 2 million of new stock, cementing his hold on the newspaper. However, Angela and Phillip secretly bring in Kenderson, a Wall Street broker with a drug problem, to handle the emission of these shares.
29	11	"United We Stand..."	Gwen Arner	E.F. Wallengren	December 17, 1982	171211	21.5/38
Cole starts working at Falcon Crest; Lance keeps him busy with manual labor, while Angela wants him to look into wine-making as well. Cole wants Lance to know that he is Joseph's father, but Melissa is against the idea. Angela pushes ahead with ousting Richard as Globe chair and pressures Kenderson into postponing the stock emission. She still needs Chase's support and brings Darryl to Tuscany Valley to spend more time with Maggie, ostensibly to work on her script. Jacqueline arrives with documents confirming Angela's financial shady dealings. She secretly negotiates with Richard and encourages Chase to work with Richard against Angela. However, Chase is bent on stopping Richard, who is building a winery on public park land and is also buying grapes at double the usual price. As Chase confronts Richard with an injunction against the winery, Jacqueline interrupts their squabble with the revelation that she is Richard's mother and that Chase therefore is his half-brother.
30	12	"...Divided We Fall"	Stan Lathan	Stephen Black & Henry Stern	December 31, 1982	171212	16.6/34
Richard refuses an explanation from Jacqueline as to why she gave him up for adoption. Despite being cleared of Carlo Agretti's murder, Cole is constantly harassed by the police and the community. Richard asks Chase to vote against Angela's take-over bid of The Globe. In turn, Chase forces Richard to give up his winery plans. At Angela's Founder's Day Party, Angela finds Lance and his new girlfriend Brenda in bed together. Richard shocks the crowd by revealing the identity of his mother, earning Jacqueline Angela's scorn.
31	13	"Pas de Deux"	Gwen Arner	Garner Simmons	January 7, 1983	171213	23.2/39
Chase punches Richard for insulting their mother at the party. Lance takes Joseph for a paternity test, which reveals that he is not Joseph's father. Angela appears unfazed but secretly has Joseph written out of her will. During martial-arts training, Chao-Li teaches Lance a lesson. Refusing Angela's offers to buy the Agretti lands, Melissa reveals business information to Chase, suggesting that Angela was to profit from Carlo Agretti's death. Maggie approaches Darryl to buy back her screenplay and tears up his cheque in his face. After seeing Nick and his wife at an arts fair, Vickie seeks advice from Jacqueline. She then approaches Nick and, after a passionate kiss, declares her love. A vengeful Angela orders Phillip to find compromising information about Jacqueline, forcing him to work through the night and miss out on a dinner with Amanda Croft. Angela confronts Jacqueline about having "sold her son to Henri Denault", causing Jacqueline to leave Tuscany Valley.
32	14	"Above Suspicion"	Larry Elikann	Robert McCullough & Suzanne Herrera	January 14, 1983	171214	22.7/38
Sheriff Robbins demands that Chase drop his investigations in the Agretti case, threatening him with legal actions. Chase is determined to continue but is unable to locate the Agrettis' former caretaker, Charles Fong. Angela insists that Lance act as Joseph's legal father. Lance tries to win over Melissa but is rebuffed. She prefers to be courted by Richard, who has his eyes set on the Agretti lands. Jealous of this, Diana Hunter informs Henri Denault. Phillip pretends to be working but instead spends the weekend with Amanda. Cole drives Vickie to town for a date with Nick. On his way home, Cole is stopped by the sheriff for speeding. Back home, he is knocked out by Carlo Agretti's (unseen) murderer, who locks him in the garage with the car engine running, attempting to kill him via carbon monoxide poisoning.
33	15	"Broken Promises"	Nell Cox	Robert McCullough & Suzanne Herrera	January 21, 1983	171215	21.9/37
Chase finds Cole unconscious in the garage, with a suicide note by his side. Cole is taken to the hospital. While the sheriff takes Cole's suicide note as an admission of guilt, an awakening Cole recalls being attacked and denies having written a note. Chase hires a private investigator. Richard refuses Henri Denault's order to return to New York, even after Denault reveals that the order comes from a mysterious superior. Denault then orders Diana to spy on Richard. When Melissa visits Cole in hospital, he demands to have his son, but she refuses. Angela insists that the Agretti lands should remain in the family. Melissa agrees on the condition of Angela paying the Agretti debts and Lance staying married to her.
34	16	"Deliberate Disclosure"	Larry Elikann	Scott Hamner	January 28, 1983	171216	23.8/40
Falcon Crest wakes up to The Globe headline "Accused murderer fathers Falcon Crest heir", a story Richard printed because Melissa would not sell him the Agretti lands. Melissa demands a retraction and sues for libel. Chase confronts Nick about his relationship to Vickie. A Hollywood studio wants to film Maggie's screenplay; she takes the position as executive producer to "protect her script", even though this means working with Darryl as director. When neighbouring vineyardist Elliot McKay is hospitalized, Angela wants to buy his vineyards, but he refuses. Phillip is about to spend the night with Amanda when Angela bursts in, ordering him to make a third-party bid on the McKay lands. Eventually, McKay sells his land to Richard. Melissa gives her father's confidential papers to Chase, including a letter sent by Angela to Carlo the day before his death. As Lance presses divorce proceedings, Melissa tearfully complains to Angela, who throws Lance out of Falcon Crest.
35	17	"Love, Honor and Obey"	Michael Preece	Kathleen A. Shelley	February 4, 1983	171217	20.1/32
Chase's investigations into the Agretti murder gets him into trouble: The sheriff objects to his meddling in the investigation, Angela lambasts him for neglecting his duties at Falcon Crest, and Maggie objects to his obsessing over the case. A nightly meeting with Charles Fong results in Chase being arrested. Maggie moves out of the house. Threatened by Angela with exposure, Amanda Croft ends her relationship with Phillip, who complains about his unrequited love for Angela. Richard hosts a housewarming party at the McKay place when Emma surprisingly returns. A week after his departure from Falcon Crest, Lance still hasn't looked for a job. Warned by Julia that without Lance, she would soon be finished at Falcon Crest, Melissa visits Lance at Lori's flat and forces herself on Lance, wrecking his relationship with Lori. At Richard's party, Lance forces himself on Melissa, resulting in passionate kisses. Lance returns to Falcon Crest and, later that night, consummates his marriage with Melissa.
36	18	"Separate Hearts"	Harvey Laidman	Stephen Black & Henry Stern	February 11, 1983	171218	15.4/22
Lance and Melissa agree on a plan to take over Falcon Crest. After an unpleasant business meeting with Angela, Phillip forms an alliance with Richard, Later, Emma rushes into The Globe and suggests several improvements. Richard makes her Vice President. He also coerces neighbouring vineyardist Visconti into selling his vineyards and winery with the threat of cutting off a public road leading through Richard's land. Richard had hoped for Nick Hogan's political support in this but, torn between his love for Vickie and his business relationship with Richard, Nick decides against supporting Richard and also tells his wife that he wants a divorce. Cole begins a romance with Linda Caproni. Chase and Maggie's attempts to talk to each other only lead to more arguments. Julia encourages Maggie to come back to Chase and also offers Chase to support his investigation. Looking for Charles Fong, Chase, Julia and Cole approach his uncle Wilson in Chinatown, but he refuses help. A threatening note put under Julia's door fails to discourage her. When Charles Fong calls again, she rushes to meet him, but her car goes off the road and explodes, just as Chase and Cole arrive.
37	19	"The Odyssey"	Harry Harris	Garner Simmons & E.F. Wallengren	February 18, 1983	171219	22.1/37
While her car is burning, Julia is found in the bushes, injured but alive. She is taken to the hospital but soon returns to work and is now dead-set against further investigations. Lance reveals to her that Tony's contract with Richard had been a forgery. Vickie leaves home to move in with Nick. Richard plots with Phillip to buy up all the independent vineyards' harvests at an increased price, putting Falcon Crest into trouble. Angela decides to travel to Paris to uncover Richard's past. Emma starts as Vice President at The Globe. While staying late in her office, she notices Phillip sneaking into Richard's office. At first suspecting Philip of spying on her, she confronts her mother, thus revealing Phillip's betrayal. Emma cracks Richard's computer code and accesses his secret files, which she takes to Chase. The files show that Richard made several payments to Carlo Agretti, suggesting blackmail. Angela decides not to take Phillip with her on her trip to Paris, as she had originally planned. Phillip shows up in Paris anyway. Angela quietly accepts this, not revealing that she knows about his disloyalty. Angela's investigations lead her to an elderly nun, who reluctantly reveals Henri Denault's past as a Nazi collaborator and that Calo Agretti also recently inquired into Denault.
38	20	"Ultimatums"	Joseph Manduke	Barry Steinberg	February 25, 1983	171220	21.5/36
Lance asks Richard for help in locating his father. Lance is suspected of tampering with his mother's car and is questioned by the sheriff. Richard is upset about Diana's conspiring with Henri Denault and about Phillip being unable to provide him with details about Angela's investigations. Meanwhile, she confers with Henri Denault in New York, leaving him the choice of making Richard pull out of California or having his Nazi past exposed. Denault orders Richard to return to New York and, as Richard refuses, comes to California himself. Meeting on a bridge in the countryside, Denault implores Richard to return to New York. A fight breaks out, during which Denault falls from the bridge to his death.
39	21	"Maelstrom"	Robert Foxworth	Robert McCullough	March 4, 1983	171221	22.5/38
Denault's death makes Richard a suspect in the Agretti murder case. Sheriff Robbins and Chase confront Richard and search his premises, where they find an underground tunnel leading to the Agretti house with Charles Fong's fingerprints on the lock. Chao-Li goes to Chinatown and demands of Wilson Fong that Charles must come forth with his knowledge about the Agretti murder. Lance has located his father in San Diego. Julia is persuaded "to clear things up" at San Diego and gives the proxy for her Globe shares to Lance; in San Diego, she is dumbfounded when she meets Tony's pregnant girlfriend and finds out that the has filed for divorce. Lance repeatedly provokes Cole, ending up with a brawl in the winery. Richard fires Diana for going behind his back, but later she and two Cartel cronies kidnap Richard. Vickie and Nick decide to get married and get Chase's approval. Maggie, frustrated with constant changes to her script and Darryl's attempts to seduce her, makes a final attempt to rewrite the script her way. In the end, she gives up, hands Darryl the first draft, and returns to her family. She finds Chase at the winery; as the two reconcile, they are almost buried by wine barrels falling down.
40	22	"Climax"	Harry Harris	Robert McCullough	March 11, 1983	171222	23.7/39
When Maggie returns home a week later, Chase tells her that he heard someone running away from the winery. Lance and Melissa celebrate the success of their scheme but, together with Angela, are called down to San Francisco to pick up a drunk Julia from a bar. While Richard's disappearance leaves everyone in California wondering, he is held in a basement of the Cartel's headquarters in New York. He is finally called up to meet the Cartel's boss, who turns out to be his mother, Jacqueline Perrault. She demands that he leave California, but he refuses, threatening Chase's family. In Richard's absence, Melissa is forced to sell the Agretti harvest to Angela at a retail price. Nick and Vickie are looking forward to their wedding but behind her back, he is sleeping with his ex-wife again. Angela hosts the wedding at Falcon Crest, with both Richard and Jacqueline making surprise appearances, while Chase locates Charles Fong at his uncle's funeral. Charles accompanies Chase to Falcon Crest, where he identifies Julia as the murderer. She produces a gun and shoots. The next scene shows a flower-draped coffin being lowered into the ground.

=== Season 3 (1983–84) ===
No. overall	No. in season	Title	Directed by	Written by	Original release date	Prod. code	Rating/share (households)
41	1	"Cimmerian Dawn"	Harry Harris	Robert McCullough	September 30, 1983	172201	23.4/41
The Channings and Giobertis, including Chase's cousin, Dr. Michael Ranson (Cliff Robertson), attend the funeral of Jacqueline Perrault. After they leave, Richard also pays his respects to his mother. He exploits Julia shooting his mother on The Globe's front page. The revelation that Julia murdered Carlo Agretti drives a wedge between Lance and Melissa, who resumes her affair with Richard. In jail, Julia rebuffs her mother's attempts to get her released on bail. She also reveals (to Emma and Chase) that she had a secret affair with Carlo and that he threatened to make the affair public if Julia wouldn't help him take over Falcon Crest. Julia runs into trouble with fellow inmates. At the hospital, Chase wakes from his coma but is paralyzed. Mel Ferrer (Phillip) and Margaret Ladd (Emma) are added to the opening credits, replacing Jamie Rose (Vickie), who returns this season in a recurring role. Billy R. Moses is now credited as William R. Moses.
42	2	"Penumbra"	Gwen Arner	Robert McCullough	October 7, 1983	172202	19.8/34
At the hospital, Chase is coming to terms with his paralysis when Angela lets slip the news of Jacqueline's death - something his family had kept from him. Angela hopes to exploit Chase's weakened state to have him declared incompetent, which would give her complete control of Falcon Crest. She blackmails Chase's physician, Dr. Lantry (Ron Rifkin), who is illicitely selling prescription drugs, into signing a declaration of Chase's incompetence. He also adds a sedative into Chase's IV drip, causing him to pass out. Angela's plot has unforeseen consequences as Joseph swallows some of the pills procured by Lance and is rushed to the hospital. Melissa blames Lance for having "tried to kill her baby". Vickie finds her husband Nick in bed with his ex-wife Sheila. Julia refuses help from Angela or Phillip Erikson and turns the court room into a spectacle.
43	3	"Conspiracy"	Harry Harris	Garner Simmons	October 14, 1983	172203	19.4/33
Lance and Melissa call a truce after the accident with her baby. Melissa announces that she is pregnant again. Dr. Lantry lets Maggie know that Chase has a bullet in his spine, which also caused an infection, and that they may have to perform surgery. Discreetly, Dr. Lantry injects drugs in Chase's I.V. Richard has a guilty conscience when he learns from Phillip that Jacqueline was dying of cancer and stepped in front of him to save his life. Richard and Melissa take advantage of Julia, by gaining her trust, to avenge the deaths of their own parents. Michael temporarily replaces Chase at the beseeching of Maggie. In the hospital, Dr. Lantry triumphantly announces to Angela that Chase has a high fever and could die when and if she wishes. Angela is shocked as she could be an accessory to murder.
44	4	"Partners"	Gwen Arner	Garner Simmons	October 21, 1983	172204	22.2/39
Michael prevents Dr. Lantry from operating on Chase, which might also leave him permanently paralyzed. Angela sets up a court date to have Chase declared illegally incompetent to own Falcon Crest. During physical therapy, Chase begins to restore the use of his legs. At the trial, Chase limps in on crutches, and the judge denies Angela’s petition. As jail inmates torture her constantly, Julia is declared to not be criminally insane. Maggie encourages Michael to take a job at the hospital and is shocked to hear that he's the executor of Jacqueline's estate.
45	5	"Judge and Jury"	Harry Harris	E.F. Wallengren	October 28, 1983	172205	21.3/37
Under Angela's orders, Lance makes Chase's return hard as he comes back to work. Lance also sabotages the Giobertis, sends Chase's staff home, and destroys one of the vats. A drainage lid breaks loose, spilling gallons of wine. Chase collapses after the leak is controlled. Phillip cautions Angela that Julia might receive the death penalty.
46	6	"The Wages of Sin"	Gwen Arner	E.F. Wallengren	November 4, 1983	172206	23.3/39
Julia is on the brink of going to prison for two murders. While the judge is preparing to pronounce the sentencing, Julia announces that she'd rather die than to face life in prison. Dr. Lantry is accused of malpractice and tells Angela that he will incriminate her if she refuses to stop Michael. Richard spins a disgusting web taking advantage of Emma and tempts Maggie to work at The New Globe as a feature writer while he fights Chase by holding up the reading of Jacqueline's will. Phillip retrieves the original contracts to Melissa that Angela had talked her into signing that would've given the Agretti land to Falcon Crest.
47	7	"The Last Laugh"	Harry Harris	Stephen Black & Henry Stern	November 11, 1983	172207	23.3/38
Julia has a hard time with the guard in prison, who has a strong vendetta against the Channings. Angela works to get her sentence reversed. Melissa offers the Agretti land to Richard after making love in order for him to prevent Angela from taking it. Jacqueline's will is split between Chase and Richard, to whom she left $50 million, only if after one year Chase finds Richard to be trustworthy. She also leaves Angela a key to a hotel suite, and Phillip must escort her there. Jacqueline has "the last laugh" when Angela finds an unmade bed with a note.
48	8	"Solitary Confinements"	Gwen Arner	Stephen Black & Henry Stern	November 18, 1983	172208	23.7/40
Julia has no choice other than to seek Angela’s help to protect her from the prison inmates. Angela pays the prison guard off to make things easier for Julia. Chase and Michael's investigation is in a crisis when Dr. Lantry's competency results may ban him from being a doctor. Afraid he might be incriminated, Angela jeopardizes Dr. Hooks (Raymond St. Jacques) on any questions. Maggie's younger sister, Terry Harford (Laura Johnson), has arrived in Falcon Crest, and finds out that Maggie is rich.
49	9	"Chameleon Charades"	Harry Harris	Robert McCullough	November 25, 1983	172209	21.1/36
In desperation, Angela does everything she can to protect herself when she learns that Chase's and Michael's investigation into Dr. Lantry's past points towards her. When Angela informs Lance that Melissa and Richard are having an affair, Lance tries to find them. Melissa covers by telling Lance that she's trying to keep Richard as an ally. Linda's father refuses to admit Cole as part of his family, while the newlyweds begin the custody battle for baby Joseph. Terry looks for her fortune in San Francisco, when she double-crosses her ways into the Giobertis.
50	10	"Double Dealing"	Gwen Arner	Robert McCullough	December 2, 1983	172210	23.0/38
Dr. Lantry is sentenced to jail because of Angela, who is concerned he will incriminate her in the attempted murder of Chase. Phillip pays the bail of Dr. Lantry, who must be sent out of the county, though Chase and Michael want to prove that Lantry is allied with Angela, who investigates Terry's dark past with plans of taking advantage of her to demolish the Giobertis. She learns Terry was a prostitute in New York, and Angela uses this truth into blocking Cole's custody suit. While Terry is scheming, she flirts with the many men in Falcon Crest, while Richard is disgusted to find out that the cartel wants 100% of his racetrack and will stop at nothing to get it.
51	11	"The Betrayal"	Harry Harris	E.F. Wallengren	December 9, 1983	172211	24.4/39
Dr. Lantry is nowhere to be found. Chase accuses Angela of arranging the bail for Dr. Lantry and says that he learned of it from Lance. After Chase finds Lantry, he confesses that Angela blackmailed him into signing the affidavit about Chase's incompetency. Dr. Lantry injects himself with a lethal dose of morphine. When a dead body is found on Richard's property, Richard's life and inheritance are in jeopardy.
52	12	"Coup d'État"	Gwen Arner	E.F. Wallengren	December 16, 1983	172212	22.0/36
Dr. Lantry is near death. Chase learns that he might lose his chance to see Angela in jail. Lance jeopardizes Angela and Melissa with blackmail, and Angela works with Phillip to commit Julia to a mental institution. Terry crawls her way into Michael's heart, while Angela blackmails her for love. Vince Caproni, who's unhappy about Linda's marriage to Cole, tells Linda that Angela's brutality towards migrant workers caused Linda's mother's death. Angela talks Terry into spying on the Giobertis or else Angela will open up about Terry's sleazy past. Chase decides to use the clause in his grandfather's will that will enable him to receive 100 percent ownership of Falcon Crest.
53	13	"No Trespassing"	Joseph Manduke	Stephen Black & Henry Stern	December 23, 1983	172213	21.4/36
Chase is in a public feud with Richard, who wants to build a racetrack that could demolish the entire wine industry; however, the final say is when the local residents vote. Angela vows that she won’t allow Chase to run Falcon Crest without her and thwarts his goals to obtain the accounting records. Lance threatens Vince over Joseph's paternity suit, and Vince suffers a heart attack soon after being threatened. In spite of the Giobertis’ warning that Terry is dangerous, she moves in with Michael.
54	14	"Sport of Kings"	Larry Elikann	Robert McCullough & E.F. Wallengren	January 6, 1984	172214	22.5/38
Richard wins the right to build a racetrack. Julia is in the mental institution, where she becomes hysterical when Richard tells her Melissa's baby is his, which pushes her in a catatonic state. Angela has made an agreement to Lance that they will both be kicked out of Falcon Crest, if they lose Joseph's custody battle to Cole. When Melissa is questioned about Lance’s affair with Maggie's baby sister, she lashes out and admits that their marriage is a farce. Angela plans to stop Chase's effort to plan a champagne market by purchasing the grape harvest he needs.
55	15	"Queen's Gambit"	Robert Foxworth	Robert McCullough & E.F. Wallengren	January 13, 1984	172215	21.5/35
Michael must face his fears from the past as he operates on Sheriff Robbins to save his life. In the operating room, Michael cannot perform the surgery, and later admits to Terry about the guilt he's felt since the day he lost his wife. Terry arranges to become Michael’s new wife after she spies on Maggie for Angela. While a gangster attacks Richard, Angela plans to crush Chase with the encouragement of Calvin Kleeger, who's the wine distributor for Falcon Crest. Kleeger lets Chase know that if Angela no longer runs Falcon Crest, he won't serve as distributor, until Chase offers the winery as collateral.
56	16	"Bitter Harvest"	Larry Elikann	Stephen Black & Henry Stern	January 20, 1984	172216	21.5/37
Thanks to Phillip, Melissa has no choice other than to sell her Agretti land to him. Richard is nearly run down by a hit man, as the cartel wants to take over his racetrack. Maggie finds out that Jacqueline had an affair with Johann Riebmann, who was the head of the Nazi Gestapo. Cole comes home to find Melissa waiting for him seductively posed in bed. He kicks her out of the house.
57	17	"Power Play"	Mel Ferrer	Greg Strangis	February 3, 1984	172217	21.7/37
When Joseph's custody battle goes to court, Lance and Melissa resort to blackmail. Cole punches Lance in front of a witness, and Lance comes to court bruised claiming that Cole had assaulted him. After hearing the story of the blackmailed witness, the case of Cole and Linda is dismissed. Maggie and Chase notices that Jacqueline's relationship with Johann Riebmann and Henri Denault led her into being a war criminal. Emma has her story printed on the front page of the Globe behind Richard's and Maggie's backs. Thanks to Emma's schemes, the cartel is not pleased about that story.
58	18	"Changing Times"	Michael Preece	Richard Freiman	February 10, 1984	172218	22.1/36
Angela makes a deal with Chase and Maggie where she gets full control of Falcon Crest as long as Melissa gives Cole custody of Joseph. Angela bosses Terry around, hoping Chase and Michael don't get along with each other, while Richard is at the mercy of the cartel's gangsters in opening his racetrack. Maggie's article about Jacqueline's past makes it the valley's business.
59	19	"The Aftermath"	Barbara Peeters	Ann Marcus & E.F. Wallengren	February 17, 1984	172219	23.9/41
Melissa's in hot water when, after the argument, she gets into a serious car crash with Linda. Lance spends the night with Terry, while Melissa suffers a miscarriage at the hospital. Overwhelmed with shame, Lance tries to apologize to Angela, but she's absolutely unforgiving. Phillip asks Angela to marry him, but she is obsessed with driving Terry out of San Francisco with the encouragement that Lance will behave more like a husband to Melissa, rather than just being a ladies' man. Richard and Pamela's relationship has gone up, when she's so concerned about him being killed. Lance and Emma visit Julia in the psychiatric hospital, who goes on a rampage. Lance calms his mother down while telling Emma that Richard had paid for the damage he has done to Julia. Knowing her sister's been taking advantage of everybody else, Maggie falls down the stairs.
60	20	"Tests of Faith"	Reza Badiyi	Robert McCullough & Garner Simmons	February 24, 1984	172220	21.7/35
Terry's sleazy, secretive past has been revealed when Angela goes to greater lengths to drive her out of San Francisco. Kate Mars, a former callgirl friend of Terry's, is being paid by Angela, who asks her to tell Michael everything about Terry's past. Angela confronts Phillip about his indiscretions, especially when Jacqueline claimed to have slept with him. Phillip refuses to tell her and quits. Chase looks for another wine distributor, learning that Calvin Kleeger serves as front for Angela. Disguised as a janitor at the mental institution, Julia escapes and hitchhikes back to Falcon Crest. Maggie finds out she has a brain tumor because of the horrifying dizzy spells and headaches she's been suffering. The hit men kidnap Pamela and force her to choose between faithfulness to Richard's and her own life. Richard refuses to give the cartel back to the racetrack. Lance barges in on Richard, searching for revenge for his mother's mental setback, only for Richard to call security.
61	21	"Little Boy Blue"	Harry Harris	Claire Whitaker	March 9, 1984	172221	21.7/38
The news about Julia's escape from the mental institution is being printed in the Globe. Julia steals a wallet and purchases a wig at a roadside coffee shop. Melissa trades her son for power, which leads her into paying a heavy price. Phillip and Chase try to determine how serious Angela is as far as trading Joseph for half of Falcon Crest. Chase is shocked, prior to Phillip producing Angela's contract, which he is happy to know as he can pry out of Angela's clutches. Angela tells Melissa it's too late to call off the deal with Chase after Melissa begs her, as Melissa is overwhelmed with guilt prior to Chase and Cole taking her child away. Chase hears that Richard bribed a county geologist to approve construction of the racetrack. Julia takes over as Kay Aberdeen, who is invited to stay with an unexpected admirer, Lucas Crosby. Maggie has to come to the terms with the fact that she has a brain tumor.
62	22	"The Gathering Storm"	Reza Badiyi	Rocci Chatfield & Ray Goldstone	March 16, 1984	172222	21.0/37
Lance loses his temper when he finds out that Melissa sold Joseph to Angela for her half of Falcon Crest. Angela cautions Lance, who must then atone with Melissa, who is now Angela's heir, and if he refuses to, he'll be penniless. Pamela plants hidden bugs, which Richard finds, leading him to think the cartel is closer to him. To make Phillip jealous, Angela goes out on a date with Carter St. John. Maggie's dying because her tumor is growing fast, so she must decide between an operation and radiation treatment. She's also beginning to lose her eyesight, and Michael warns if she doesn't have surgery, her loss of sight could be irreversible. However, questions about Michael's surgical abilities may have to wait. Being concerned for her safety, Lucas teaches Julia how to shoot a gun.
63	23	"Final Countdown"	Harry Harris	James Fritzhand	March 23, 1984	172223	23.0/39
Michael talks Chase into allowing him to operate Maggie's brain tumor, which has already taken her sight. Michael also enlists his former lover, Lillian Heller, an anesthesiologist for Maggie's surgery. Lillian's a houseguest, which makes Terry very jealous. Chase has high concerns if he'll ever see his wife again. Angela strongly encourages Lance to reconcile with Melissa for producing a true heir at Falcon Crest. Lance begs Melissa to give marriage a second chance, when she looks at his deception and has no intention of sharing it with him. Phillip expands his winery staff by hiring Angela's best people. Pamela is carrying out Spheeris's order in order to demolish Richard, who is obsessed with attempting to win over Chase to obtain his inheritance for the completion of the racetrack.
64	24	"Love's Triumph"	Harry Harris	Robert McCullough & Suzanne Herrera	April 6, 1984	172224	21.8/39
Maggie's heart stops when Michael and Dr. Heller remove the last of her brain tumor, and she falls into a coma. Richard is very disgusted when Chase turns over Jacqueline's $50 million trust fund to St. Martha's convent in Paris, at the time when Richard desperately needs the money. The cartel plot against Richard jeopardizes Pamela's life. When Pamela disappears, Richard has lost the only person whom he truly loved.
65	25	"Win, Place and Show"	Robert McCullough	Robert McCullough & Suzanne Herrera	April 13, 1984	172225	20.5/37
A public spectacle about the grand opening of the racetrack, where the cartel begins to carry out plans. Richard moves a bomb planted be the cartel, causing them to explode. To please Angela, Lance has made a commitment that he and Melissa will produce Angela's first great-grandchild. Melissa learns that she can no longer have children due to injuries sustained in her car crash. While Chase and Maggie have thought Michael and Terry are both traveling to Mexico, they are shocked when the couple announce their marriage. Angela agrees to marry Phillip. Police find out about Julia's identity.
66	26	"For Better, For Worse"	Harry Harris	Ellis Marcus	May 4, 1984	172226	22.0/38
As Angela's wedding is coming closer, Julia is about to shoot her. It all begins with Julia (dressing in a nun's habit), heading towards the church. Chase recognizes her when she locks him in a closet. Julia fails to shoot Angela as she leaves for Falcon Crest as well as the wedding reception. Cole tries to locate Joseph, only to find that Julia has taken him hostage.
67	27	"The Avenger"	Michael Preece	Garner Simmons	May 11, 1984	172227	22.3/39
Lance and Emma find out that Julia is in the springhouse with Joseph, who's being held hostage by her. Terry lies constantly to Michael when she receives a letter about the dark past. After Angela reads a letter Julia wrote to her while she was in college, she regrets not being a very good mother to her due to her busy career. The house is surrounded by police officers when Angela enters in exchange for Joseph. Angela admits that she has failed as a mother to Julia, and finally gets Julia to listen to what her mother has to say about loving her. Julia hands Angela the gun, but the deputy sheriff ends up shooting, which sets the kerosene lamp and house on fire. Chase and Lance scramble to locate Angela and Julia when Lance is knocked out and has to be rescued. The springhouse explodes.
68	28	"Ashes to Ashes"	Barbara Peeters	E.F. Wallengren & Ann Marcus	May 18, 1984	172228	23.7/41
The springhouse is on fire. The coroners inspect a ring and bone fragments, identifying the remains of Julia. In a letter to Lance, the final request from Julia was to have her ashes scattered in Italy. Angela asks both the Channings and the Giobertis to travel to Italy, hoping that Julia's death can reunite the family. Richard believes that Pamela may be alive in Europe, a hostage of Norton Crane, and sends Padgett there to find her. Lance is told by Melissa, that she will be moved out of Falcon Crest and back into her father's house when he returns from Italy. Angela already knows Melissa has filed for divorce and can't have children of her own. Melissa pays one of the Falcon Crest employees to stage an accident at the winery so that Cole will have to stay behind with her. As Chase, Richard, and his pilot, Jack, leave to check possible travel routes to Italy, Spheeris enters the hangar posing as a mechanic and heads toward Richard's plane carrying a toolbox and smiling. Angela, Philip, Lance, Emma, Richard, Maggie, Michael, Terry, Linda, and Joseph all take off in a plane. One of its engines catches fire and Chase suspects sabotage. The plane dives perilously and goes down in the Colorado Rocky Mountain Range, leaving everyone's lives hanging in the balance.

=== Season 4 (1984–85) ===
No. overall	No. in season	Title	Directed by	Written by	Original release date	Prod. code	Rating/share (households)
69	1	"Requiem"	Harry Harris	Rod Peterson & Claire Whitaker	September 28, 1984	173201	23.4/40
As Melissa and Cole wait at the rescue site where the helicopters arrive with the remaining survivors of the plane crash. As Angela leaves the plane, she says to her family that Phillip is dead, as well as Chase's co-pilot and Terry's husband, Michael. Richard has brought up the fact that the cartel was responsible for the crash, while Chase maintains it's a wreck. Angela blames Chase and has vowed to force him into paying. At the hospital, Linda is in critical condition where Cole visits her and makes plans for her future. Before she passes away, she tells Cole how much she loves him. Terry learns that she's a rich woman. In Buenos Aires, The Cartel meets and it's revealed that the ultimate goal is to reclaim a valuable Third Reich treasure buried under Falcon Crest. Laura Johnson (Terry), Paul Freeman (Gustav), Sarah Douglas (Pamela) and Simon MacCorkindale (Greg Reardon) are added to the opening credits, replacing departing cast member Mel Ferrer (Phillip), as well as Abby Dalton (Julia), who returns a few episodes later.
70	2	"Father's Day"	Reza Badiyi	E.F. Wallengren	October 5, 1984	173202	20.0/35
Chase continues to have nightmares about the crash and is concerned that whatever it was than he could've done more to land safely. Greg Reardon (Simon MacCorkindale) is offered a job as a lawyer, much to Angela's surprise, to fill the void for Phillip, who died. She also promises to help launch his political career, the following year, if he accepts it. Maggie and Cole pack up Linda's things. As Richard heads into the limousine, Spheeris levels a pistol at him, who also refuses to buy the property, made especially for the members of the cartels. In planning a fuel leak story that will eventually blame chase for the crash, Angela, Lance and Alan Caldwell of the F.A.A., detailed about it. In Buenos Aires, Johann steps into his limousine, it immediately explodes while Gustav stands by, pleased to be watching his father die.
71	3	"Strangers"	Harry Harris	Claire Whitaker	October 12, 1984	173203	18.5/30
Angela and Lance partners against Chase in the F.A.A.'s investigation of the crash. Being bribed by Angela, the airplane's mechanic, Buzz Whitehead, who lies and claims that Chase had been drinking prior to the flight and had ignored the leak warning. Chase is determined to find out who wrecked the plane and swears that the cartel was responsible, Richard will pay. Gustav comes to Tuscany Valley to obtain the Falcon Crest secret. Angela, Lance, and Greg try to scheme to take The Globe away from Richard. Maggie's father visits her. The Giobertis throw a party to introduce their new champagne, however, the celebration turns into a nightmare for Maggie, when Angela publicly announces that Maggie is adopted, and her father is unable to deny the hurtful truth.
72	4	"The Outcasts"	Reza Badiyi	Rod Peterson	October 19, 1984	173204	19.4/33
The cartel bestows Angela a falcon statue that contains a listening device, which the cartel uses to eavesdrops her discussions about The New Globe. Terry gets an unwelcome visit from Joel McCarthy (Parker Stevenson), her ex-husband, who claims they were never divorced. He demands $25,000 just to keep quiet, when Terry refuses to lend support for his drug habit. Angela reports evidence about the plane crash, incriminating Chase, who later calls Senator Silverlake to put a spin on the F.A.A. report, who then releases their report on the accident and Chase learns that he's responsible, hence, his license was suspended. Emma gives her stock in The New Globe to Angela, helping her to take over the newspaper.
73	5	"Shadows"	Harry Harris	William Schmidt	October 26, 1984	173205	19.9/34
Pamela learns that Richard's attacker is Padgett, who pulls back the covers only to find the pillows where Richard's body was supposed to have been. While Padgett attempts to flee town, Richard hasn't been knocking out property, Gustav is very furious. At The New Globe, Lance was hired as publisher much to the dismay of many of his new staff. Chase has been removed as the head of airport authority by the Board of Supervisors. Joel, broke and desperate to support his drug abuse, attacks Maggie at Tuscany Downs. She rarely sees him, and later, Cole unhappily hires Joel as the new transportation foreman for the vineyards. Julia has been called out by Emma in the vineyards, where Angela shows up, Julia then disappears again. Abby Dalton (Julia) is credited at the end of the episode as "also starring". She returns to the opening credits the following episode.
74	6	"Lord of the Valley"	Reza Badiyi	E.F. Wallengren	November 2, 1984	173206	21.9/37
For Gustav's quest for land adjacent to Falcon Crest, he approaches Sam Gianinni, and when he refuses to cell, Gustav gets Spheeris to pay a special visit that evening. Richard purchases the entire radio station, immediately fires the entire staff and makes Frank Taggert the new general manager. Chase and Maggie travel to New York, to unveil her past. Joel gives Terry written evidence that they are married, and it requires an additional $10,000 check for him to keep quiet. Lorraine Prescott, Richard's stepdaughter from a previous marriage, returning to his life, the news that left Pamela stunned. Angela sees Richard's fierce protectiveness of Lorraine might be the weakness she's been searching for him. Julia reappears on the porch, asks Emma for money, and also asks that Angela not know about this.
75	7	"The Intruder"	Harry Harris	Scott Hamner	November 9, 1984	173207	21.1/36
The Giobertis have been notified by Sheriff Robbins that Sam Gianinni has been murdered, apparently during the robbery. Lance takes advantage of his new power to use Sam's death in The Globe. Maggie, who's now working at Richard's new radio station to do work writing copy. Richard's ex-wife, Stephanie, comes to town and gives greater knowledge about her daughter about Richard's past behavior, cautioning her that he may attempt to take advantage of her too. Gustav bestows Mary Gianinni his condolences and jeopardizes to kill her if she does not sell her property to him. Chase has a copy of the F.A.A. report and is angry that somebody is lying to make him be guilty. Francesca Gioberti (Gina Lollobrigida) is in Italy, who faces disaster at her vineyards, she travels to Falcon Crest, where Angela is surprised to see her, with the help of Francesca's cousins.
76	8	"Pain and Pleasure"	Reza Badiyi	Greg Strangis	November 16, 1984	173208	20.5/36
Angela is shocked when she finds out that Francesca has evidence that she's Angela's half-sister and legal heir to one third of Falcon Crest. Angela also exploits it, at her advantage by making a deal with her to buy her half-sister's third in control to gain more of Falcon Crest than Chase. When Julia's at Lucas Crosby's home, she tells him she's tired of running and being afraid somebody will recognize her. When she goes to the police to turn herself in, they don't believe she's Julia Cumson. Emma helps Chase finds evidence that Buzz Whitehead had been bought off into lying to the F.A.A. investigator, and Senator Silverlake was forced into suspending Chase's license. Cole resuscitates his love with Melissa, as the two were in an opening relationship with each other, however, Greg will try to wreck their relationship.
77	9	"The Trump Card"	Harry Harris	William Schmidt	November 23, 1984	173209	18.8/34
While Chase is in Washington, D.C., who uses Emma's findings, he confronts Senator Silverlake, with the evidence that he was bought off into falsifying the F.A.A. reports. He confesses, releasing Chase of all the blame in the plane crash. Lorraine beseeches Lance to print a retraction to an article that connects Richard to the criminal underworld. Lance relishes seductions than retractions, however Lorraine ignores his advances. Richard and Gustav seek romance in Francesca, to get closer to her share of Falcon Crest. On the other hand, Angela and Greg tell her to sign a contract for her share of the vineyards. Private Investigator, Mike Harris, lets Maggie know that her real father was killed in World War II. Though Greg is determined to have a serious relationship with Melissa, she tells him she can't see him anymore as it jeopardizes her relationship with Cole.
78	10	"Tarantella"	Reza Badiyi	Claire Whitaker	November 30, 1984	173210	21.1/36
Chase hears that Jasper's case is being reopened, he's very doubtful of Angela's motives, and confronts her, who also learns that Francesca is selling her third of Falcon Crest to Angela to save her vineyards in Italy. Confused, Francesca had listened to Angela, telling her that Chase would be very pleased. Cole wants to love Melissa enough to move in with her, especially against his parents' wishes. Richard unsuccessfully attempts to prevent Lance from seeing Lorraine and cautions his nephew not to hurt his stepdaughter. Francesca wants to throw a farewell party, before returning to Italy. She and Lance perform the tarantella dance and scold her family for greed and hatred. Jean-Louis helps Francesca by stealing her agreement from Angela's safe. Prior to the evening, Gustav's henchmen follow Julia, seize her and drive off.
79	11	"Going Once, Going Twice"	Harry Harris	E.F. Wallengren	December 7, 1984	173211	20.7/35
Riebmann and Spheeris look after Julia at cartel headquarters, who's drugged and confined on a bed in a mock hospital room. Riebmann formulates plans to convince Julia that Angela is responsible for her daughter's kidnapping. In order to give Chase some bargaining power with Angela, Melissa agrees to sell her father's harvest to him. When Angela finds out about this, she begs Greg to find a way to remove Melissa from the will. At court, Judge Stevens announces that Jasper's handwritten will is binding, and that an appeal is unjustified. Francesca doesn't pay attention to her previous contract with Angela and accepts seal bids for her share of the land. The family gathers for the sale at Falcon Crest, even though Gustav bids the highest at $31 million, Francesca will not sell the price to a stranger, nor will she compete against Angela and Chase, against each other, therefore, it's Richard's land. Angela and Chase have careful eye contact, as they both find themselves to be unwilling allies against Richard.
80	12	"The Triumvirate"	Reza Badiyi	Rod Peterson	December 14, 1984	173212	20.4/34
Thrilled with his one-third ownership of Falcon Crest, Richard makes plans to buy new harvests. He acknowledges to Terry that he realizes Joel is blackmailing her and has made a commitment in helping her if she sells him her land. Spheeris and Riebmann continue to plague Julia, in the mock hospital, saying that Angela has given them permission to perform a frontal lobotomy on her. Claiming to work for the U.S. Government, Ben Landale, arrives at Falcon Crest with some commandments to look for Johann Riebmann. Now that Melissa's and Lance's divorce have been finalized, Melissa agrees to marry Cole. Secretly working with Angela, Mike Harris tracks down Maggie's mother, Charlotte Pershing, and takes her to the radio station. Angela relays to Greg she found Maggie's mother, because her compulsive gambling habits will create big problems with The Giobertis.
81	13	"Winner Take All"	Barbara Peeters	William Schmidt	December 21, 1984	173213	18.4/32
As Melissa is being cut out of the will, Angela reinstates Lance as her single heir. For Gustav to scheme Julia by trusting him, he models as Julia's psychiatrist. Ben and Chase check Falcon Crest for surveillance devices and when Gustav listens to them talk about Henri Denault with Angela, he commands Spheeris to investigate Ben immediately. Greg's immediate romance with Melissa is taking a toll on Cole's trust in Melissa. Joel gave back the necklace he stole from Terry and bestows her an engagement ring. She reluctantly agrees to marry him within two weeks. At the Turf Club, Angela wants to allow Charlotte die down to her weakness for gambling. Chase puts Maggie in the dark about his plans with Ben, in searching for Johann in Europe.
82	14	"Suitable for Framing"	Stan Lathan	E.F. Wallengren	December 28, 1984	173214	21.2/36
Being angry about written out of Angela's will, Melissa begs Joel's help by bestowing him $50,000 to disgrace Lance in Angela's eyes. Joel deceives Lance into having a private meeting then locks him up in a deserted warehouse. Pretending to be Lance, he uses Lance's Porsche to drive Angela off the road. While the real Lance is released from the warehouse, he is arrested immediately for his grandmother's murder. Angela acknowledges her plot to Greg to ally with Richard in order to get Chase to stop his champagne business. Gustav commands to follow Chase and Ben to Paris, where the two search for clues leading to Johann's whereabouts. When Ben and Chase are caught in a set-up, Ben dies. Charlotte loses her temper over her gambling impulses at Richard's racetrack.
83	15	"Vicious Circle"	Larry Elikann	Rod Peterson	January 4, 1985	173215	21.5/33
Angela receives a phone call from Lance, who's trying to bail out, who also knows that he cannot rot in jail. Ralph Delaney arrives and informs him that The New Globe will pay his bail. Richard asks Maggie to do a story about Lance and uses the situation. As Lorraine finds out about this, she's enraged, who accuses Richard of slanting the news. Chase tightens security at his house, and purchases a gun. He finds out from Herb Boutilier from Washington, D.C., that Ben never worked for the government and gets another phone call warning him to stop looking for Ben. Charlotte and her old gambling friend meet and begin to lose money for the track. To keep Joel from Terry, Richard sends him to a drug rehabilitation center. Even though Lance is determined he was framed, Angela denies trusting her grandson, she disinherits him. Lance moves in with Lorraine at the Tuscany Inn.
84	16	"Insult and Injury"	Barbara Peeters	Juliet Law Packer	January 11, 1985	173216	21.8/35
When Maggie investigates Lance's case, she's his only hope, to find him not guilty. She approaches Angela with proof in support of her grandson, and to his surprise, Angela admits that she can trust her grandson's side of the story and has made a commitment by letting Greg defend him, provided that he stopped dating Lorraine. Lance and Lorraine said goodbye, sadly, planning to reunite after he's been released. Charlotte fails in retrieving the pearls from the pawn shop, therefore Maggie cries when she learns the pearls were missing. Riebmann listens in as Angela makes plans for Lorraine to be her heir, in the surveillance room, and begins to love her. Chase and Cole discover a surprise plan to undermine their champagne production.
85	17	"Acid Tests"	Larry Elikann	Claire Whitaker	January 25, 1985	173217	20.0/32
With Richard and Angela looking on, Chase and Cole dump hundreds of gallons of nasty champagne. Chase believes one of them is responsible for the poisoning. With the obsession Richard has about him destroying Lance, encourages Maggie to quit her job at the radio station. When Maggie's mother suddenly disappeared, she searches for her, while traveling to Los Angeles. Prior to meeting his stepfather, Alexander Nicolau, Chase unveils his mother's risky connections with the cartel, who is also determined to unveil why Riebmann fiercely wants Tuscany Valley. There, reporters and spectators crowd the courthouse for Lance's preliminary hearing. Richard is highly satisfied with Judge Holder's ruling that Lance still must stand trial for the attempted murder of Angela Channing.
86	18	"The Showdown"	Michael Preece	Rod Peterson & E.F. Wallengren	February 1, 1985	173218	20.1/32
The truck is seized, and the tanker is drained, there went Richard's first shipment of Francesca's wine delivered for bottling. Richard highly doubts Chase and Cole, and after they fight, Chase finishes that Riebmann and the cartel had demolished it. He also details his suspicions that DeBercy may actually be Riebmann. Richard is surprised at the extent of Chase's knowledge about the cartel and so is Riebmann, who is listening from his surveillance room and realizes he must act quickly before his identity is revealed. He continues to use Emma to gather more useful information to further his plot. Meanwhile, Lorraine discovers that she is pregnant with Lance's baby. While Chase, Richard and Greg go to the authorities, Angela receives an invitation at gunpoint to visit Mr. Riebmann and his houseguest, Julia.
87	19	"Retribution"	Barbara Peeters	Rod Peterson & E.F. Wallengren	February 8, 1985	173219	20.3/33
At the Riebmann's house with Julia, Angela's kidnapping brings her face to face, while Chase, Richard and Greg are on a mission to save her. All of them play at Riebmann's hand, getting control of the guards and escape. Riebmann is being followed by Richard, as he enters into the mineshaft where the treasure is buried. Chase, Pamela and Chao-Li stand by in horror, while the mine begins to collapse. Richard tries to escape, when Gustav and Renee are buried with the treasure. To avoid further complicating Lance's life, Lorraine is planning an abortion procedure, a situation Lance is strongly opposed to. Melissa and Cole were disappointed with Father Bob, when he brings up the annulment of her marriage to Lance could take up to two years. They chose to do a nice ceremony, the following week.
88	20	"Forsaking All Others"	Lorraine Senna Ferrara	Claire Whitaker & William Schmidt	February 15, 1985	173220	19.4/33
At Falcon Crest, Lance is dumbfounded when he sees Julia appear on the stairs. Greg and Angela manage to persuade Judge Leeds to transfer Julia's sentence to a convent in Oregon. Meanwhile, Angela plans to buy Sam Giannini's estate. Richard meets Cassandra Wilder, who attracts both Richard and his advertising account for Francesca wine. Greg continues to pursue Melissa until the day of the wedding. Dr. Mitchell informs Melissa that her auto crash has rendered her unable to bear any more children and Melissa fails to build the courage to tell Cole, who wants more children. However, Cole learns this in the worst possible way, through Angela. Feeling that Melissa has deceived him, Cole decides at the last minute that he cannot go through with the wedding and abandons Melissa at the altar in tears. Paul Freeman (Gustav) is removed from the opening credits.
89	21	"Recriminations"	Lorraine Senna Ferrara	Greg Strangis	February 22, 1985	173221	20.2/34
Melissa confronts Angela when she realizes that Angela had provoked Cole into walking out on their wedding. Although Melissa tries to seek comfort with Greg, she cannot put Cole out of her mind. After arguing with Melissa, Cole swallows his pride, reunites with her and marries her in a meadow in a small private ceremony. Lance proposes to Lorraine and surprisingly receives Angela's support. Unfortunately, Judge Holder has denied a change of venue for Lance's trial. Before Lorraine has a chance to discuss her pregnancy and engagement with Richard, Angela deviously provides him with the information. In turn, Richard confronts Lorraine, who begs him to be happy for her. Instead, Richard throws her out of the house, telling her that, as far as he's concerned, she is dead. Abby Dalton (Julia) is removed from the opening credits. She would return in a recurring role the following seasons.
90	22	"House Divided"	Joseph Manduke	William Schmidt & Claire Whitaker	March 8, 1985	173222	17.5/29
Greg coaches Lance on his trial testimony as they nervously wait to hear whether the trial will be postponed. Cole and Melissa happily honeymoon in Tahiti. Chase convinces Connie Giannini to keep the land she inherited upon her mother's death rather than sell it to Angela. At KRDC, Pamela advises Richard not to reject Lorraine just when she really needs him. When Richard resists Lorraine's attempt to reconcile, she has no choice but to remain at Falcon Crest, where she is quickly learning that Angela cares only about heirs. The next day at breakfast, Greg soberly announces to the family that the trial extension was denied. Horrified, Lance and Lorraine realize that he will go on trial that Monday.
91	23	"The Trial"	Robert Foxworth	Paul L. Ehrmann	March 15, 1985	173223	17.6/30
Lance stands trial for the attempted murder of Angela, but his real court battle is against Richard Channing, who has secretly bribed the judge. Richard discovers that Greg and the prosecutor, Caroline Earle, have agreed to a deal that would considerably lighten his Lance's sentence. He passes this information to Judge Holder, who, on instruction, rejects such an arrangement. Cole and Melissa consider hiring a surrogate mother to bear them a child. Chase decides to hire Connie to help Cole with their champagne production. Cassandra and Damon come closer to an opportunity for revenge on Angela. Cassandra must keep their identity and plan hidden from Richard, who finds Cassandra intriguing. Melissa's cousin, Robin, arrives at the Gioberti household for an extended visit and hungrily sets her sights on Cole and the mansion.
92	24	"Justice for All"	Philip Leacock	Dick Nelson	March 29, 1985	173224	19.2/32
Cole battles with Connie, resenting her interference in his champagne operation. However, Chase convinces her to stay on, not realizing she is thrilled to be working near him. In court, after the foreman announces that the jury cannot reach a verdict in Lance's case, Judge Holder orders the jury to deliberate again. After Maggie observes Richard and Holder meeting in the parking lot, she becomes determined to discover if they are conspiring against Lance. While Melissa fears the outcome if anyone discovers that she was responsible for Lance's arrest, her cousin Robin sees Melissa's search for a surrogate mother as the perfect opportunity to move closer to Cole. Cassandra and Damon use Richard and Cole to further establish themselves at Falcon Crest. After the foreman reads the verdict, Lance and his family hear Judge Holder sentence him to seven years in state prison.
93	25	"Devil's Harvest"	Robert Foxworth	John F. Perry	April 12, 1985	173225	18.5/33
Angela takes advantage of Lance's conviction to assume his job as publisher of The New Globe. Richard provokes Lance into a fight at a restaurant, forcing Lance into hiding to avoid being returned to custody. Angela realizes that if Falcon Crest expands to accommodate a contract with Helios Foods, Richard and Chase will fall heavily into debt, and she will once again be the sole owner of the wine empire. She pushes them to agree to bid on the contract. Maggie prefers that Chase sell out and get away from Angela, but he refuses. Cassandra and Damon push the Helios deal to advance their own plans for a takeover. Late that night, Robin tries to seduce Cole with the idea that they could give Melissa the child she wants.
94	26	"The Decline..."	Reza Badiyi	Rod Peterson & Greg Strangis	April 19, 1985	173226	16.9/29
Richard and Chase go with Angela to bid on the Holios deal. Chase looks after Maggie for moral support in his decision not to sell out, when she chooses not to offer anything. Melissa reluctantly pays Pamela $100,000 for keeping quiet about the hiring of Joel McCarthy, to set Lance up. Not only Terry admits her past connections with Joel to Greg, but she also lets Greg know where to look for him. Meanwhile, Terry suspects that it was Joel, who threw Angela under the bus. Emma and Lorraine partner up against Angela to look for Lance; they found out that Angela and Chao-Li got him hidden in Chinatown. Thanks to Mrs. Channing's devious plans; Maggie was offered a job as acting publisher at The Globe; this leads to the dissolution of their marriage. Chase strongly opposed the plan; however, Maggie is open to the challenge.
95	27	"...and the Fall"	Barbara Peeters	Greg Strangis & Rod Peterson	May 3, 1985	173227	18.3/32
Chase joins Connie at the winery and hugs her, before he convinces that he has received a loan that was needed to bid with Angela. However, Connie's former senator, might jeopardize the bank deal. Cole notices that Connie might be the jeopardy of something else. Greg searches for Joel and notices that he died at Camp Mary Jane of a drug overdose. He also confronts Richard of his distrusts with Lance's framing, hoping he can expose his responsibilities. Lance might be part of Angela's plan to send him to Italy and makes arrangements for them to meet at the boat. Pamela cautions Angela that Richard and the police are heading towards Lance's hideout and Lance plans to disappear. One Lorraine enters in; she finds out he has already escaped; who hurries to the fire escape before Richard would delay her; and in a rush; slips and plummets two stories to the street.
96	28	"Cold Comfort"	Philip Leacock	William Schmidt	May 10, 1985	173228	19.1/32
Lance severely opposes Angela's orders to board the ship; until she gets an answer from her grandson, as to why Lorraine is not there. A phone call at Falcon Crest has been received where Lance learns that Lorraine is in the hospital, where she slips in a coma. Lance also drives fast in Angela's car to see her, risking everything he has to this point. Being recognized at the hospital, Lance gets an opportunity to see Lorraine and encourages her to keep fighting, before 2 police officers take him away. Coming out of her coma, the following day, Lorraine begs Richard to release Lance from jail. On a tip from a turf club bartender, Greg searches for proof he needed to find Melissa guilty. Determining she turn herself in, within 48 hours, he confronts her. Cole has been shut out, again, as far as his wife's dealings, who also receives devastating news about his own past actions, when Melissa's cousin, Robin, enter at their doorstep.
97	29	"Confessions"	Barbara Peeters	Claire Whitaker	May 17, 1985	173229	22.0/37
A forlorn Lorraine misses her Lance, all the while having lost her baby. In jail, Lance acknowledges Angela about his worries of Lorraine's survival. Angela encourages him and promises that Greg is working on his release. Pamela delivers Maggie a cassette tape, at The New Globe, describing all the conversations that Richard had taped. Both Maggie and Greg play the tape, hearing Richard and Judge Holder scheme against Lance. Cole receives word from Melissa that Joel is framing Lance. Then, striking back, Cole informs her that her surrogate mother's plan worked because Robin is pregnant. Judge Holder has no choice other than to release Lance, due to the overwhelming evidence against him. Happy, Lance hurries himself to the hospital, where the judge marries him and Lorraine.
98	30	"The Avenging Angel"	Reza Badiyi	E.F. Wallengren	May 24, 1985	173230	16.4/30
For Angela to assume Chase and Richard to go bankrupt, after a competitor to win his bid, her scheme is to regain control of Falcon Crest will fall through. She has no idea about Cassandra Wilder, who holds the liens on their shares. Her mother, Anna Rossini, arrives for her much anticipated vengeance against Angela, because her daughter owns two-thirds of Falcon Crest. Chase is accepted by Connie to become a partner in Giannini Winery, while working at the winery. Maggie enters in and catches them in a celebratory embrace. Furious, she'll also be moving out that evening, and Chase vehemently tells her to go, eventually. Testifying on Melissa's behalf is Angela, which gives Melissa a permissive 60-day sentence in jail, in return for the Agretti land. Before Lorraine dies, Lance must sign the release paper for her to remove Lorraine off life-support, prior to her condition, growing increasingly worse, due to brain damage. Maggie and Richard comfort each other, one evening, until an explosion rips through his house, trapping them. Sarah Douglas (Pamela) is removed from the opening credits.

=== Season 5 (1985–86) ===
When this new season began, Falcon Crest had started with the regular practice a recap to remind the viewers of the previous episode's recollections, before a short sneak preview of the new episode, prior to the main title. Midway throughout the season, Jane Wyman had been absent for only 2 episodes, due to her abdominal surgery.

No. overall	No. in season	Title	Directed by	Written by	Original release date	Prod. code	Rating/share (households)
99	1	"The Phoenix"	Reza Badiyi	Rod Peterson & Claire Whitaker	October 4, 1985	174201	19.3/32
Maggie has amnesia, despite her and Richard surviving the explosion. To rebuild their marriage, Chase takes Maggie home. Angela has to reveal a long-kept secret in her fight to save her wine empire from the encroachments of a vengeful mother and daughter to plan to take over the estate. Ken Olin (Christoper) is added to the opening credits. Ana Alicia is now credited as Ana-Alicia.
100	2	"Unfinished Business"	Robert Foxworth	E.F. Wallengren	October 11, 1985	174202	18.0/31
Father Christopher has been welcomed by Angela in Tuscany Valley, there, he presents an additional obstacle in her efforts to keep her wine empire intact. To try to help Angela, Greg investigates Anna's past, including her hospitalization history. Richard is the answer of many threats. While Melissa is released from jail and returns home to find a distracting situation between Cole and Robin. Lance seeks solace in Terry's wiles. Maggie asks Chase about Connie.
101	3	"Blood Brothers"	Reza Badiyi	E.F. Wallengren	October 18, 1985	174203	17.8/30
In order for Angela to save her empire, frantically, she calls on the expertise, wealth and influence of Peter Stavros (Cesar Romero), an old friend of hers. Prior to Maggie living in a reclusive cabin to reassemble her life, she asks Richard about their relationship, before the explosion. Father Christopher takes interest in the vineyards' field workers, which horrifies Melissa and annoys Angela.
102	4	"Echoes"	Robert Foxworth	William Schmidt	October 25, 1985	174204	17.9/30
Chase does everything he could to help Maggie regain her memory, when she's rebuffing his advances; encouraging him that she barely remembers their marriage. Until Angela marries Peter, she can only pay attention upon seeing Falcon Crest. For Father Christopher to get to know his family better, Angela and Greg use him as proof that Anna had a motive to kill Dominic. Discouraged, Anna sneaks into Angela's bedroom and set the entire house on fire. Despite Richard wearing a bulletproof vest, he is shot. Lance's behavior is continuing to be incredibly irresponsible and so discouraged.
103	5	"Ingress and Egress"	Reza Badiyi	Greg Strangis	November 1, 1985	174205	19.2/32
The manor was set on fire, where Lance rescues Angela and Emma. Cassandra notices her mother was behind in both fires. Despite Maggie suffering from amnesia, Chase talks Maggie into renewing their marriage vows with another wedding. On that day, Angela pours her own brand of vitriol on the ceremony by bringing up Chase's relationship with Connie Gianinni. The unknown assassin of Richard's tries again, he's trapped. Father Christopher gives some hard facts of life, learning that she's an aspiring singer, once a cocktail singer, named Apollonia (Apollonia Kotero), whom Lance rescues.
104	6	"Sharps and Flats"	Robert Foxworth	Greg Strangis	November 8, 1985	174206	17.8/30
When Lance takes Apollonia and her friends to Falcon Crest, he finances her demo records; a responsibility in which Angela severely disapproves; Lance outfoxes Angela by reclaiming the publisher's job at The New Globe, which served as his first move in achieving his goals for Apollonia's career, much to Angela's annoyance. Chase and Maggie argue over Connie; that it triggers old memories for Maggie. Richard risks his opportunities at his racetrack.
105	7	"Changing Partners"	Reza Badiyi	Deanne Barkley	November 15, 1985	174207	18.9/31
Lance trades his interest in The New Globe; in exchange for Richard's radio station to have a showcase for Apollonia's singing career, behind Angela's back; who did everything she could to unsuccessfully purchase Terry's land and in attacking that provokes Terry into investing Tuscany Downs. Angela suggests the Board of Supervisors to approve a new irrigation system that would place the land where Chase is working underwater. Maggie reprimands Angela; prior to her recovery. Emma meets Dwayne (Daniel Greene), a handsome truck driver.
106	8	"Storm Warning"	Philip Leacock	Dick Nelson	November 22, 1985	174208	19.5/29
Angela learns that Lance has exchanged jobs from a publisher to a rock radio impresario, this led her to expel her grandson from Falcon Crest. Emma returns to Angela's house, after an all-night tryout in Dwayne's truck. Peter continues to focus on his marriage proposal to Angela, very seriously. Richard and Cassandra begin a new relationship, despite a mistrust.
107	9	"The Naked Truth"	Reza Badiyi	E.F. Wallengren	November 29, 1985	174209	17.4/29
As Angela announces her engagement to Peter Stavros, at the party, she shocks the social gathering of guests by informing that Cole is the father of Robin's baby. Angela prepares a strange method of revenge; who's also smarting from having been outmaneuvered by Chase on the valley's water conservation project. Angela sues Lance and Richard over the exchange of their newspaper and radio swap; where Lance transforms his stations, from all-talk to all-rock in showcasing Apollonia's songs.
108	10	"Inconceivable Affairs"	Philip Leacock	William Schmidt	December 6, 1985	174210	18.6/31
When Angela is reluctant to change her name and to quit running her wine empire, to marry Peter, they finally set the date. In the same situation as Peter, Emma asks Dwayne to marry her; determining not to lose him. When Richard proposes to Cassandra, only if they trusted each other. Cole and Melissa agree to a church wedding, when the bride becomes disturbed because Father Christopher must perform the ceremony. Jordan is happy to date Greg; much to his persistence. When Maggie received an advanced check, she can hardly remember the novel. Lance's actions get distracted, when a man enters from Apollonia's past re-enters her life. Angela loses her court battle in overriding Lance's exchanging with Richard's at the radio station.
109	11	"Strange Bedfellows"	Reza Badiyi	Greg Strangis	December 13, 1985	174211	19.7/32
Angela's life continues to be endemic with challenges, especially with Emma's love life blossoming, Lance disobeying his own grandmother and Chase stealing her distributors. Angela tries to buy off Dwayne to leave her daughter being disappointed. Angela bestows her blessing for their marriage if he sells his trucking business. Yet, Emma shows a redeeming quality to encourage her mother and her demands. Angela blackmails the valley's agriculture inspector to get Chase's vineyards quarantine, just to shut Chase down. Greg talks Angela into honoring her promise to help him get into politics. Lance is willing to show Apollonia, the real Walker McDowell. Cassandra, who is pregnant gets broken up by Richard, while Robin gives birth.
110	12	"False Hope"	Philip Leacock	E.F. Wallengren & Greg Strangis	December 20, 1985	174212	18.1/31
Lance takes Father Christopher in the vineyards to show him how conniving his grandmother, Angela operates; this is where Angela directs Lance to buy off the pickers not to pick Chase's grapes. Father Christopher is disgusted with her underlying schemes, at the same time; he confronts her. Chase turns the tables on Angela; after he learns Angela's ruse in time to save his own harvest. Terry marries Richard Channing. Emma talks Lance into following Apollonia, when she embarks on a tour. The fundraiser of J.J. Roberts is very successful at Falcon Crest; after that, Jordan's mother unveils the reason Jordan detests her father when Greg learns Jordan was working at the Halfway House for abused young ladies. Peter Stavros's daughter tries to retrieve her father's briefcase from Angela. Robin disappears with the baby, when Melissa and Cole pay Robin the money.
111	13	"Fair Game"	Stan Lathan	E.F. Wallengren & Greg Strangis	January 3, 1986	174213	18.8/31
When Father Christopher moves into the mansion, Angela indicates to Lance that it might affect his inheritance if his half-brother leaves the priesthood. Lance changes his mind about giving Apollonia, a chance to go on tour without him; but reconsiders; a second time when Father Christopher crushes Melissa's expectations when he realizes that she is a married woman, because he told her he is on leave from his duties. Cole and Melissa are worried about Robin's paternity test, when they bring the baby home from the hospital. Maggie has been given a clue (from Emma) about the mysterious stranger in Maggie's book. Greg and Richard separately try to find the secret in Jordan Roberts's life. Being curious about Peter Stavros's disappearance, Angela leans he left his briefcase at her house. Blaming Angela the most, Richard decides on marrying Terry.
112	14	"Conundrum"	Gwen Arner	E.F. Wallengren & Greg Strangis	January 10, 1986	174214	18.3/29
Lance takes Father Christopher in the vineyards to show him how conniving his grandmother, Angela operates; this is where Angela directs Lance to buy off the pickers not to pick Chase's grapes. Father Christopher is disgusted with her underlying schemes, at the same time; he confronts her. Chase turns the tables on Angela; after he learns Angela's ruse in time to save his own harvest. Terry marries Richard Channing. Emma talks Lance into following Apollonia, when she embarks on a tour. The fundraiser of J.J. Roberts is very successful at Falcon Crest; after that, Jordan's mother unveils the reason Jordan detests her father when Greg learns Jordan was working at the Halfway House for abused young ladies. Peter Stavros's daughter tries to retrieve her father's briefcase from Angela. Robin disappears with the baby, when Melissa and Cole pay Robin the money.
113	15	"Checkmate"	Simon MacCorkindale	William Schmidt	January 17, 1986	174215	19.1/32
Angela takes Julia home for a visit, in an attempt to bring calm to Mrs. Channing's family. her attempt to get her daughter influence Father Christopher backfire when Julia becomes disobedient towards her mother. A nationwide search is beginning for Robin and the baby, Hope is completely vain, until Robin and the Maggie for money and admits that Cole is not the father of that baby. Richard wants to bleed his new wife of, all because of her assets, he also learns Terry isn't gullible. Dwayne tries to elope with Emma, who invites him for dinner with her family, much to Angela's displeasure.
114	16	"Collision Course"	Harry Harris	Claire Whitaker	January 24, 1986	174216	18.5/30
Robin and Hope returns with Maggie, however, Robin refuses to give up on the baby. Angela asks Cole to prevent Melissa away from her grandson; after Angela tells him that she saw Melissa and Christopher hugging. When they refuse to admit about Cole's accusation, Cole cautions Melissa that she should have to stop behaving like a tramp if she wants to keep Robin's baby. A paternity test proves to see if Robin assures Cole that he isn't the father of Hope's. Greg wants answers from Jordan; to not destroy herself, who cries that she was raped by her father; as a little girl. Jordan confronts her father, J.J. crumbles under the weight of the truth; who also, commits suicide.
115	17	"Shattered Dreams"	Robert Foxworth	Kate Boutilier	January 31, 1986	174217	18.0/31
Jordan finds Greg for solace, while developing a split personality to hide from reality; hence, the guilt from her father's death built up nightmares, herself. Dwayne teases Angela; and brings Emma home from the hospital. Lance leaves San Francisco for Europe; in pursuit of searching for Peter. Angela is very happy to have an opportunity to strike back at Melissa; prior to Robin consulting her (Angela), for help in keeping her daughter. Chase and Richard agree to work together, challenging Angela by opening Terry's winery.
116	18	"Gambit Exposed"	Harry Harris	Greg Strangis	February 7, 1986	174218	18.0/30
Lance poses himself as a playboy gambler, while in Monte Carlo, who is also invited to a high-stakes game at a chateau where he learns Peter is a prisoner. Lance's attempt to release Peter; who is being held by his daughter and Phillippe Hubbert, only to succeed in threatening him. In Hawaii, at a wine-tasting conference, after Chase's wine beats Angela's, he announces his professional relationship/business partnership with Richard, during his speech. The paternity test indicates that Cole is the father of Robin's baby. Jordan is confused; when Terry might have a clue about her. Ken Olin (Christoper) is removed from the opening credits.
117	19	"Finders and Losers"	Philip Leacock	Dick Nelson	February 14, 1986	174219	17.4/29
A combination of both Sofia's trying to reason with Phillippe (about his father) and Lance's imprisonment, puts both of them in the same situation. Fortunately, a shootout at the chalet releases all of them. Angela and Greg flies to Europe to find Lance, when he doesn't report to her at Falcon Crest, unfortunately, they show up too late. Emma and Dwayne find Ursula in Mexico, with the encouragement of a flirtatious police officer. Jordan's concerned, as her memory lapses; who finds unnerving clues to her behavior. Chase plans a ruse for one of the valley's owners, who also approves of Maggie's tour to promote her book.
118	20	"Flesh and Blood"	Harry Harris	E.F. Wallengren	February 21, 1986	174220	16.8/27
Peter's children pay him a surprise visit at Angela's house. Angela's success at recovering from the feud, between Sofia and her father results in new wedding plans for Angela and Peter. Maggie goes to New York, where she meets Jeff Wainwright (Edward Albert), an admiring press agent, while on tour. Terry spies on Jordan and learns of her evening plans. Terry pries with Richard's detectives, who are finding Cassandra, this leads Richard into being angry; yet, his anger turns into seduction. Cole admits to Maggie he has a volatile marriage with Melissa, where their custody battle with Robin, do not fit to be good parents.
119	21	"Law and Ardor"	Harry Harris	Claire Whitaker & E.F. Wallengren	February 28, 1986	174221	17.4/30
Angela disappears, and the residents of Falcon Crest were all concerned about her, especially Dwayne, who's more concerned for Emma. They all know Angela is about to be arrested for attempting to hijack Chase's wine shipment. After Sheriff Gilmore, he has trouble finding Angela and Peter. Cole moves back home, after Robin takes Hope from Melissa and Cole. Jeff travels with Maggie, all across the country. Richard and Chase refuse to agree (together) to deal with methods of purchasing more vineyards. Terry hires a private detective to spy on Jordan, prior to her needing Greg's help. Lance makes sure whereabouts of his grandmother's disappearance; whereas, Peter returns with her power of attorney. Although she is still credited, this is the first episode in which Jane Wyman does not appear.
120	22	"Hidden Meanings"	Philip Leacock	Greg Strangis & William Schmidt	March 7, 1986	174222	16.8/27
Lance is very aware that Peter has been so secretive from the rest of the family. Angela had a good mind and a good reason not to give control of Falcon Crest to an outsider. While Emma reconciles with Dwayne, Maggie turns down Jeff's romances, when he's already obsessed with her. Richard hires a detective to look after Jordan, after she gave clues about Richard's and Chase's hidden business plans. Eric takes Melissa dancing, whilst enjoying his campaign. Greg is fired when he failed to follow Peter's instructions to withdraw $30 million of Falcon Crest funds for him. Jane Wyman does not appear in this episode.
121	23	"In Absentia"	Robert Foxworth	Juliet Law Packer	March 14, 1986	174223	16.5/28
Angela comes back and learns the havoc Peter has wrecked during her absence, who promised very strongly to take vengeance on him. Before Angela would come back, Greg gets a temporary order to stay at Peter's hand at Falcon Crest, when it's too late. Not only Peter is gone, her $30 million is gone, as well. In addition to Richard, who learns that Jordan's revealing his financial problems to Terry, but he also learns about Peter purchasing the mortgage at Tuscany Downs. When Maggie's tour has concluded, Jeff's determined to win her over, by taking her to Tuscany Valley. Melissa attempts to talk Eric to form a partnership with her. Jane Wyman returns at the very end of this episode.
122	24	"Unholy Alliance"	Larry Elikann	Dick Nelson	April 4, 1986	174224	17.2/30
Despite Angela marrying Peter, she learns he took her $30 million to prevent her for being prosecuted for arranging the hijacked Chase's wine. Angela puts herself away, who still must serve time in jail, until the $50,000 bail can be paid. While Jordan offers Maggie some professional help for her problems, Jeff's appearances in Tuscany Valley annoys her. Angela learns that Peter has made her Richard's partner in Tuscany Downs. Not only Angela is shocked to hear that Dwayne had moved into her house; but also to find that Lance and Jordan are sleeping together.
123	25	"Dangerous Ground"	Harry Harris	Kate Boutilier	April 11, 1986	174225	17.1/30
After Angela found Lance and Jordan in bed; Greg learns Jordan's escapade with Lance, who become more disturbed when he meets Monica, Jordan's second personality. Jordan goes to Richard, looking for work, where he gives her the opportunity to defend Julia, at her retrial. Angela intrigues Chase and Jeff into a confrontation, prior to Maggie finding out some disturbing facts about her boyfriend. Chao-Li is surprised when his long-lost daughter arrives at Falcon Crest. Emma and Dwayne search for a house that's for sale, to maintain some privacy. As Angela tries to be an equal partner to Richard at The New Globe, Melissa and her new partner have a difficult time in paying attention on business.
124	26	"Cease and Desist"	Reza Badiyi	Greg Strangis	May 2, 1986	174226	16.9/29
Despite Sheriff Gilmore who couldn't find any ground to arrest Jeff, Chase plans to get an order restraining Jeff from any contact of Maggie, who finds notes from Jeff. She still knows he's spying on her. Melissa and Eric hold a groundbreaking ceremony for their new winery. Angela disgusts Peter, when she accused Eric of treachery and ordering him out of the house. Jordan seriously asks for Greg's understanding. Due to Emma's shock, Dwayne finds a honeymoon cottage. Cole confronts Li-Ying for trespassing and surveying the earthquakes on the Giobertis land. Chase asks B. Riley Wicker to investigate the financing of Tuscany Downs, which makes Richard nervous.
125	27	"Consumed"	Harry Harris	John F. Perry	May 9, 1986	174227	16.5/29
Jeff holds Maggie hostage in his cabin in the hills prior to him penetrating the security surrounding her, where he reads aloud the grim last chapter of his novel to Maggie in which she knows. Angela is opposed to Emma and Dwayne's marriage, when her daughter finds a solution for herself and Dwayne's housing dilemma. Jordan withstands help from her mother until Julia makes her recognize her family problems. Chase blocks Terry into admitting Richard's association with Ms. Jones. Li-Ying decides to stay in America, though earthquake studies lead to a threatening prediction.
126	28	"Captive Hearts"	Reza Badiyi	William Schmidt	May 16, 1986	174228	18.8/32
Chase and Cole try to locate where Jeff is holding Maggie hostage; only to see they're interrupting Maggie's escape attempt, that backfires on Chase. At Falcon Crest, Angela interrupts Emma's and Dwayne's elopement, in hopes of a better wedding, there. Emma encourages Li-Ying to change her mind about staying in San Francisco, after an earthquake prediction. Angela sends Lance to break up the Melissa Agretti/Eric Stavros friendship. Jordan is arrested, and Chase gets shot.
127	29	"The Cataclysm"	Harry Harris	E.F. Wallengren	May 22, 1986	174229	17.9/31
Chase gets shot by Jeff and is rushed to the hospital, where he learns he has hemorrhage, who must undergo surgery. Angela and Lance close the winery down, who both break Melissa's and Eric's friendship by forging Melissa's signature. Greg and Harriet learn Jordan's split personality, Monica, is in control, after Greg and Harriet bail Jordan out of jail. Dr. Kramer and Harriet help Jordan face the personality behind for which she has kept it a secret, for all that she had been suffering. While searching for Cassandra, Richard arrives in England, at her grave. Cassandra had died, prior to giving birth and Damon Rosini disappeared with her baby boy, afterwards, Sabrina Cross shows up with his son, Michael. The season finale concluded with an earthquake, rippling through Tuscany Valley, leaving the many people being injured in the wake. Robert Foxworth planned on leaving the series after this episode, with his character Chase dying after being shot. However, producers lured him back for one more season by allowing him to direct more episodes.

=== Season 6 (1986–87) ===
This was Robert Foxworth's final year, during which he also directed some episodes. Midway throughout the season, Michael Reagan, Jane Wyman's real-life son, had a recurring role as the concierge in a hotel.

No. overall	No. in season	Title	Directed by	Written by	Original release date	Prod. code	Rating/share (households)
128	1	"Aftershocks"	Reza Badiyi	Richard Gollance	October 3, 1986	175201	17.0/29
San Francisco dealt with the aftermath of the earthquake, which struggle to deal with the loss of property and loved ones, when aftershocks rock the region and the people, even Dwayne & Terry, who died. After the earthquake, Peter was struggling to find Angela, until he heard her, and got her up. Angela even got Lance to call the paramedics on Julia, only to find that all telephone connections were down, hence, she was transferred to a church that Father Bob transformed it into a field hospital for earthquake victims, along with the information center for concerned family and friends, before she was transferred to a different Tuscany Valley hospital, where she lays in a coma, not too far from where Chase's has been treated for his gunshot wound, where Maggie and Cole awaits. Maggie has nightmares about Wainwright, whom Angela brings up to Maggie, when Angela doesn't know anything about what's going on in these nightmares. John Callahan (Eric), Dana Sparks (Vickie, replacing Jamie Rose in the role) and Cesar Romero (Peter) are added to the opening credits, replacing departing cast members Laura Johnson (Terry) and Simon MacCorkindale (Greg).
129	2	"Living Nightmare"	Roy Campanella II	Dick Nelson	October 10, 1986	175202	15.2/26
Maggie overcomes her real fear of firearms and buys a gun for protection, after the ghost of Jeff Wainwright. Vickie moves back to Chase's & Maggie's house, who admits that in addition to going through two divorces but has lied about being a popular ballet dancer. Maggie refuses to believe that a group would be responsible for the shooting of Chase, despite the ballistics test results. Angela thinks about a foreclosure. In spite of a few close calls, Kit (Kim Novak) succeeds in keeping quiet to Peter about her past.
130	3	"The Stranger Within"	Reza Badiyi	William Schmidt	October 17, 1986	175203	17.5/31
When Wainwright returns to Tuscany Valley, he's already interested in The Giobertis, but more importantly, to their daughter, Vickie. Angela's doubts and the appearance of a detective threatens Kit Marlowe's masquerade. Angela learns that an unexpected source jeopardizes her expected hold on the Agretti grape harvest, when she expands the valley's plush spa to her holdings. Lance's father, Tony Cumson (John Saxon), returns to Tuscany Valley, who's shocked at the condition of his ex-wife, as Angela moves fast to prevent him away from the family.
131	4	"Fatal Attraction"	Roy Campanella II	Howard Lakin	October 24, 1986	175204	16.9/29
Wainwright changes his plots to curry favor with himself with Chase's and Maggie's daughter, Vickie, after Maggie confesses the reasons for her agony to Chase. As Richard learns of Kit's secret, he's willing to use it to his advantage. Lance and Melissa are back in having a relationship with each other. Tony tries to reconcile his father/son relationship with Lance, when the scars are deep-rooted. Angela hosts a party for the opening of her spa.
132	5	"Perilous Charm"	Reza Badiyi	Scott Hamner	October 31, 1986	175205	15.6/28
Thanks to Vickie, who needs protection, from her father, who's uncertain about this, Maggie also needs protection, from her husband, as Chase hires a private detective. Lance fires kit, who's being denunciated by Dan Fixx (Brett Cullen). Angela makes plans to have Lance compete against Dan. Julia reminds the family about an unexpected decision. Ms. Jones has fallen for Richard's scheme and 2 fishermen suspect they have caught the big one. Richard also traps Angela to bail him out of their racetrack. Lance and Melissa come back after their wedding and Dan becomes doubtful of Kit's mysterious stunts. Wainwright trying to receive feelings from Vickie.
133	6	"Flashpoint"	Roy Campanella II	E.F. Wallengren	November 7, 1986	175206	17.7/31
An article about Vickie who's in jeopardy with Wainwright, that he knows she knows the truth about him, he harasses her and pushes her to bear a slight resemblance to Maggie. Angela reluctantly hosts Lance's and Melissa's wedding reception, bringing forth mixed emotions from the guests. Chase and Melissa disagree about Joseph. Lance attempts to talk his father to finance his partnership in Melissa's winery, fortunately for his father, Tony accepts Chase's offer. Emma's date, Richard, relays Angela that Tuscany Downs is going out of business. Angela and Peter argue over her stolen checks. When Maggie confronts Richard about his article on Wainwright, Chase punches and decks him out.
134	7	"Double Jeopardy"	Nicholas Sgarro	Greg Strangis	November 14, 1986	175207	18.8/33
Wainwright returns to Tuscany Valley, who breaks down the doors of the Agretti house, prior to Vickie slips from his seizure, even punch Chase in his quest to win Maggie over. Much to Angela's obsession with Dan Fixx, Lance is disqualified from competing with him, and surprises his grandmother with a new undertaker. Angela lets Peter know about why she is taking care of Dan, esp. when The New Globe recognizes him as an ex-convict. In order to save Chase's life, Richard springs his trap on Ms. Jones, just before time ran out. Cole's very unhappy about his father's new partnership with Lance's father. Kit negotiates in the way of Angela's stolen checks, because of the crisis that's causing Peter.
135	8	"Nepotism"	Philip Leacock	Richard Gollance	November 21, 1986	175208	18.1/31
Emma searches for guidance from a storefront psychic, after Lance annoys Angela, about his defection to Richard's New Globe and continues her patronage of Dan Fixx. For Kit to ask Richard for help from Fixx, she gives him a weapon to use against Angela. Cole becomes very disappointed with his father's partnership with Lance's father, whilst Maggie can't help her unstable son or herself to improve their relationships with Chase. Angela bestows Ms. Jones's sister with the babysitting job in Richard's house. Near Chase's and Tony's vineyard, Richard dumps waste.
136	9	"Slow Seduction"	Nicholas Sgarro	Howard Lakin	November 28, 1986	175209	17.6/32
The Giobertis are in a crisis – Maggie's strong concern about her problems of her children, primarily her baby, after Chase buries himself in his business deal and his political campaign. Meanwhile, Cole releases his disappointments out on his family, Vickie becomes totally fond of Dan Fixx. Chase and Tony learn that their vines are damaging. Angela and Lance argue over their own associations. Richard's been seduced by Meredith, for the first time. Lance makes secret plans with Karlotti (Marjoe Gortner) to buy out Emma's stock certificates in The New Globe. Through Kit's disguise, a hit man approaches.
137	10	"Maggie"	Philip Leacock	E.F. Wallengren	December 5, 1986	175210	18.4/32
Despite Maggie, which estranged her from her family, no matter the consequences, has determined to keep her baby. Cole is uncompromised about leading his life away from his family, and Maggie must give him her blessing. He leaves Falcon Crest for Australia. Vickie sees Dan Fixx, whose parents aren't very happy. Chase accepts his wife's situation on her future motherhood. Angela attends Karlotti's séance, which is a big asset in bestowing Lance control of Emma's holdings. Chase and Tony learn vineyards tainted from the dumping of Tuscany Downs, containing evidence pointing to Angela's secret plan to destroy her rivals. Dan confides in Vickie. Lance works at The New Globe. With this episode, William R. Moses (Cole) departs Falcon Crest, unhappy with the producers' storyline suggestions. He returned in two episodes of the following season as a guest star.
138	11	"Hot Spots"	Nicholas Sgarro	Greg Strangis	December 12, 1986	175211	16.6/29
While Maggie battles her isolation, Chase has trouble saving his vineyards and Angela attempts to have her own independence. Vickie lets her parents' problems to influence her relationship with Dan Fixx (Brett Cullen). Chase's marital problems contemplate on his campaign for county supervisor, he and Maggie confront themselves about their rocky marriage. Peter faithfully stands by Angela, especially when he is troubled over Angela's innocence or guilt. Richard is bound to defeat Lance's attempt at a takeover of The New Globe as the ghost of Ms. Jones, starts to haunt him. Kit dies to Tony's charm, who is horrified by Stafford. Brett Cullen (Dan) is added to the opening credits, replacing William R. Moses (Cole).
139	12	"False Front"	Philip Leacock	William Schmidt	December 19, 1986	175212	19.1/32
Lance's tryout of winning control of The New Globe backfires, which contributed to his past schemes of Melissa's life. His ploy to control The New Globe is being overcome by Richard, for producing the man who framed Melissa, who begs that Lance move out. Emma bring Karlotti home to locate Wayne's ghost and starts to convey her affection on television. Angela begins to understand that Lance framed her. Kit is reluctant to leave Tony for Guy and his plans of a bogus suicide. Dan is willing to breakthrough Vickie's defenses. Maggie detects Chase's celebration kiss from Gwen and has complications with her pregnancy.
140	13	"Missed Connections"	Robert Foxworth	Richard Gollance	January 2, 1987	175213	17.4/27
Preparing to go away, Kit, with Stafford encouraging her, lays down the ground rules to make her bogus suicide reasonable and notices that she will sever very important ties. Angela attends a dinner party for Peter's birthday. Looking for help for her rocky marriage, Melissa looks in the wrong places. Maggie learns that her baby may be born with a variety of disabilities and leaves Chase alone when he refuses to respect her feelings. Meredith hires her ex-boss to protect Erin Jones, while Vickie is hired by Angela to work at her grandaunt's spa.
141	14	"Dark Passion"	Nick Havinga	Howard Lakin	January 9, 1987	175214	20.2/33
Peter faults himself for not recognizing Skylar's trouble, at the same time, her absence and possible suicide casts a funeral cloth over the mansion. His troubles drive him away, when Skylar's tragedy gets Emma to finally notice that she Dwayne has passed away, and that Angela is the last one to comfort her daughter. Tony observes the truth about Skylar. Richard is desperate when his son is kidnapped. Chase learns that one of the two people in the valley, he really hates, Angela and Richard, one of them is taking flowers to his wife and the other is trying to be closer to his daughter. Tony receives a phone call from Lance, when he needs his father's help that Melissa is suffering a nervous breakdown.
142	15	"When the Bough Breaks"	Michael A. Hoey	Greg Strangis & E.F. Wallengren	January 23, 1987	175215	17.4/28
Not only there's a huge ransom, but the kidnappers urge that Meredith, who's the only one to identify them, to bestowed over to them, in exchange for Richard's son. Richard observes that Angela was responsible for putting Meredith in his household, who must promise seriously that she has to pay for the damage she has done to him. Chase travels to Oklahoma to determine for himself, the kind of man his daughter is having a relationship with, while being more concerned about Vickie's involvement with Dan, he (Chase) later gets beaten up by the small town's amoral Chief of Police and his henchmen.
143	16	"The Cradle Will Fall"	Roy Campanella II	E.F. Wallengren & Greg Strangis	January 30, 1987	175216	17.7/30
In a hurry to rescue Chase, Dan Fixx is in jail, and Chase has to save him and himself, from amoral officers. Angela declines Peter's proposal to join him in Monte Carlo and is surprised at his response. Ecstatically, Richard tells Maggie the news of his son and Vickie misinterprets the kiss her mother bestows him. Emma observes the truth about Karlotti, when she none of her feelings changed about him. Peter calls Tony in Monte Carlo to bring up Skylar. Angela and Richard confront each other. Lance is worried over Melissa's reactions.
144	17	"Topspin"	Michael A. Hoey	William Schmidt	February 6, 1987	175217	16.5/29
Lance loses his opportunity to join an exclusive club, that estranges him from Joseph, much to Melissa's strange behavior. Angela hires a new lawyer, after Richard was named as the new distributor for Angela's wines. Angela and Vickie become worried about Dan's obsession with Suzanne. Richard tries to join Peter in his vendetta against Angela. Lance joins Chase and Maggie to help him with their grandson, Joseph.
145	18	"A Piece of Work"	Joseph Scanlan	Richard Gollance	February 13, 1987	175218	16.5/29
Angela pries into the lives of Chase, Richard, Maggie, Vickie and Dan, while Vickie's and Dan's affair is confused by Angela's strange moral code. Richard is being accused, by Angela, of fathering Maggie's expected child, her schemes force Chase's altruistic defense of distressed vineyard managers seem like a play for private gain, that puts a wedge in his involvement with Gabrielle Short (Cindy Morgan). Melissa's disturbed behavior strengthens a closer understanding between Lance and Tony. Peter tries to win Angela back and sever his ties with Richard, at the same time, while Richard believes Kit can be played to bring Peter to his side.
146	19	"Dance of Deception"	Robert Foxworth	Howard Lakin	February 20, 1987	175219	17.4/28
Angela schemes with rich newcomer, Roland Saunders (Robert Stack) in her plans to bring Richard down, when Maggie gives birth to her baby at Falcon Crest, too early. Angela finds a kindred spirit in Saunders, "the rudest billionaire in the Fortune 500". When Richard makes the deal in signing the birth certificate of Maggie's baby, Chase shocks them by signing it himself. The call of the baby disturbs Emma. Lance asks Tony about Kolinski, when his father has to lie to his son, when he's protecting Kit. The matron of Falcon Crest comes with Saunders, and Peter is opposed to this, prior to Angela's international wine show at the spa.
147	20	"Hat Trick"	Charles Correll	E.F. Wallengren	February 27, 1987	175220	17.4/29
Richard uses the connects to blackmail Kit, who has found the link between her and Roland Saunders. Angela gives Vickie a look at her ancestors and encourages her to be proud of her heritage. Temporarily, Meredith saves Tony from Kolinski. Angela gives financing to Lance and Melissa, but very expensively. Emma schemingly married Karlotti, for Emma to have her first child. Chase takes steps to prevent the Tuscany Land Corp., from purchasing the valley.
148	21	"Battle Lines"	Harry Harris	Greg Strangis	March 6, 1987	175221	17.1/30
Peter jeopardizes Angela and Roland as he tries to learn the linkage to Kit. Due to Angela's interest in Maggie's baby, Maggie has to come to Francine Hope (Melba Moore) who tells Maggie that she must give the baby up for adoption if the child is to lead a wonderful life. Emma and Karlotti apply to adopt a child, instead, after Emma refuses to allow them to have a child. Angela promises to offer Dan and Vickie, a vineyard, while she plans their engagement party. Peter urges Tony to tell him about Kit. Chase gives Lance a partnership with him and Tony, after he makes Gabrielle a proposition. Angela is in the process of solving the mystery of Kit Marlowe.
149	22	"Nowhere to Run"	Robert Foxworth	Jeff Freilich	March 13, 1987	175222	16.4/29
Vickie and Dan set the bar of Angela's engagement party by attempting to escape from it. Richard and Peter confront Saunders, after Kit orchestrates a need to tell Tony goodbye. Maggie comes to find her baby, who now knows is Chase's. Later, when Emma surprises Angela (by introducing her adopting son), one of the guests in the winery was found dead.
150	23	"Cold Hands"	Michael A. Hoey	Richard Gollance	March 27, 1987	175223	16.0/29
Tony and Lance help each other as circumstantial evidence involves them in the murder, when it is never to be taken advantage of, when Angela returns to her word. When Angela notices that it's more important to look after her grandson, than his father, Angela breaks her promise to Lance. At the party, Vickie's and Eric's influences forces Dan to face a situation. Francine Hope is willing to help Chase and Maggie, who are then willing to contact the lawyer who planned the adoption of their baby. Richard is finally willing to notice his vendetta on Angela. Melissa is all about the rage, when she entertains as "Veronique, the Slumming Socialite" on amateur night at a San Francisco nightclub.
151	24	"Body and Soul"	Stan Lathan	Max von Nathanmar	April 3, 1987	175224	16.7/29
As Angela suggests District Attorney Wilkinson to go on a campaign for attorney general, he is absolutely pleased, and fortunately for her, if he agrees to convict her ex-son-in-law, Tony, of murder. Wilkinson searches until he knows that he can capture Tony. Angela is furious at Peter, when he works with Richard, this leads Angela, in pursuit of getting a divorce. As Chase and Maggie can't find the adoptive parents of their child, Maggie begs a mother's appeal in the media, while Chase bestows a reward. Gabrielle takes in Chase's offer to be responsible for his wine operations. Vickie has nobody else on her block to help, except Eric. While performing as a diva, Melissa continues her double life.
152	25	"Loose Cannons"	Michael A. Hoey	Greg Strangis	April 10, 1987	175225	17.4/31
While Tony begins to doubt Kit, Angela traps Melissa, and later Richard tries to comfort Maggie, he plans a vacation for Maggie to overcome her blues, when a ghost from the past comes back to haunt her. Angela finds out that Melissa's secret world caves in. Chase wants a divorce. Tony doubts that Kit Marlowe may have taken advantage of him in order to remove doubts from her. Angela gives a new job for Dan. Lance bestows encouragement to Chao-Li. Even when Emma ensnares Karlotti with plans for a church wedding, her offer of community property turns him from a man in jeopardy to the one who has already struck the mother lode.
153	26	"The Great Karlotti"	Reza Badiyi	E.F. Wallengren	May 1, 1987	175226	17.2/30
Emma learns how great her husband really is, hers and Karlotti's church wedding ends. While the couple stands up before Father Bob for their nuptials, Karlotti's reputation as a lover has improved. For somebody to try to bring Lance back home, Angela intimidates Melissa in front of Lance, Richard and Dan. Maggie and Chase looks for clues to find their baby in Boston. When Lance finds out about the whereabouts of Kit's, he plans to block her in his quest to help Tony. D.A. Wilkerson comes to Angela, with the fact that he's got Tony "nailed to the wall". Vickie and Eric come back from their escapade.
154	27	"Chain Reaction"	Jeff Freilich	Howard Lakin	May 8, 1987	175227	16.5/29
The gesture proves nothing when Kit comes to Tony's defense. Until Kit enters in the courtroom, Tony's trial proceeds as if D.A. Wilkerson had written it. Chase is too late to block Melissa, due to Angela's threats, after he unveils evidence that Melissa had engineered the botched paternity test. Chao-Li loses his faith because Angela and Lance had burned the midnight oil to take care of him. Richard has a better chance for happiness, when Chase and Maggie choose to divorce fast.
155	28	"Desperation"	Reza Badiyi	Story by : Jeff Freilich & Howard Lakin; Teleplay by : Howard Lakin	May 15, 1987	175228	18.6/33
The car carrying Melissa and her baby plunges into San Francisco Bay. Angela discovers her child, thought to have died in childbirth, is alive. Peter faces charges of murder, fleeing with Kit, after Angela and Peter reconcile, and she tries to buy his freedom. A clip of the 1951 movie, The Blue Veil, featuring Jane Wyman, is used as a flashback scene when Angela reminisces about being told in the hospital that her newborn son had died. In anticipation of a writer's strike, the show continued filming episodes after the season finale, with clips from these episodes shown as previews.

=== Season 7 (1987–88) ===
Due to the largest number of rotating guests on Falcon Crest, and of budget constraints, five main characters (Brett Cullen, Margaret Ladd, John Callahan, Dana Sparks, and Chao-Li Chi) didn't appear in several episodes of this season.

No. overall	No. in season	Title	Directed by	Written by	Original release date	Prod. code	Rating/share (households)
156	1	"Opening Moves"	Reza Badiyi	James Fritzhand	October 2, 1987	176201	15.1/28
Melissa, Richard, and Dan survive the car chase. Chase is presumed drowned after he does not resurface. Chao-Li, who fell down the stairs, sends Lance to rescue Emma, who stands on the Falcon Crest roof threatening to jump. Angela moves to hide the secret that Peter left her. Maggie confronts Angela over her long-standing feud with Chase, while Richard moves to stop Angela from moving against Maggie in her time of mourning. A former soldier who served with Chase in Vietnam arrives in the valley. A mysterious woman appears on Maggie's doorstep claiming to have shared a hidden past with Chase, and to collect a loan payment that remains outstanding. Angela's scheme to hide a family secret leads to a shocking revelation for Richard. After appearing in every season prior as a supporting cast member, Chao-Li Chi (Chao-Li) is finally added to the opening credits, replacing departing cast members Robert Foxworth (Chase) and Cesar Romero (Peter).
157	2	"Obsession, Possession"	Michael A. Hoey	Lisa Seidman	October 9, 1987	176202	16.4/31
Angela tells Richard that she's his mother, not Jacqueline, but he doesn't believe her. Angela convinces Chao-Li to have a risky surgical procedure. Emma embarks on a new life as a businesswoman, but it does not sit well with Angela. Melissa tries to make peace with Lance after he moves in with Dina. At Chase's memorial, Angela and Father Bob unveil the memorial plaque for Chase. After the funeral, Richard tries to reconcile with his mother, but she turns him away.
158	3	"Redemption"	Reza Badiyi	Cynthia Darnell	October 16, 1987	176203	15.1/28
Angela asks Dan to run the Del Oro Spa. He chooses Melissa, much to Angela's dismay, to run The Max nightclub. In Las Vegas, Richard wins Eric's Nevada land and plans to build a town called Channing there. Nicole continues to harsass Maggie until Angela enters the fray and blackmails Nicole. Angela arrives at the spa as Nicole leaves and informs Maggie that she bought the loan note and intends to collect her first payment on it.
159	4	"The Big Bang"	Michael A. Hoey	Joel J. Feigenbaum	October 23, 1987	176204	14.9/28
Richard Channing and John Remick (Ed Marinaro) both work to win Maggie's favor by coming up with the $30 million to pay off Angela. Angela is too late when she sends Lance and Dan to investigate Emma's new job. Vickie tells Maggie that she is pregnant and admits to Eric's gambling problem. Dina (Robin Greer) and Lance are both involved in a car crash, with Dina seriously injured. Maggie and Richard are unaware that they are under surveillance when they visit his new Nevada property. They return home to face Angela's demand for payment. An explosion destroys the Gioberti house.
160	5	"Dead End"	Reza Badiyi	William Schmidt	October 30, 1987	176205	15.1/28
Angela and Richard are placed in precarious positions after they individually plot to meet the men who's responsible for the mysterious activity in Tuscany Valley. Maggie doesn't understand Richard's reluctance to trust the police. Angela makes Wilkinson (Dick O'Neill) reveal Richard's ownership of lake property in Nevada. Emma, who's happy to write her autobiography, hires a ghostwriter and personal manager, and they head for Los Angeles. While Lance learns that somebody sabotaged to his car, Vickie finds herself among the homeless. Maggie returns to her house to salvage her memories. Angela and Richard visit the man who tried to kill them.
161	6	"New Faces"	Michael A. Hoey	Diana Kopald Marcus	November 6, 1987	176206	14.6/27
After Angela and Richard meet Carlton Travis (Eddie Albert), Angela plots with Travis to bring Richard down financially. Richard knows that Travis is a man who will refuse to listen to anyone except Angela. In spite of all the cutbacks on Hollywood offers, Emma works on her screenplay. Melissa goes with Dan to Australia to visit Cole and Joseph. Dina's nurse works on her patient to try to disgrace Lance and rip him off. Angela and Carlton learn that they have a history. Jane Wyman previously worked with special guest star Eddie Albert in the films Brother Rat, its spin-off Brother Rat and a Baby, An Angel from Texas and My Love Came Back.
162	7	"Sweet Revenge"	Reza Badiyi	Lisa Seidman	November 13, 1987	176207	14.4/27
Travis kidnaps Richard and Angela after Richard declines his offer of a truce. Maggie hires an old friend to plan a birthday party for Richard's son Michael. Angela brings a puppy as a gift. Dina's nurse has her sign Lance's half-million-dollar check over to her. Lance believes that Frank Starr damaged his car. Tragedy befalls Lance and Dina.
163	8	"Man Hunt"	Michael A. Hoey	James Fritzhand	November 20, 1987	176208	14.2/25
Angela must open old wounds when searching the past to save Richard from Travis's deadly revenge plot. She visits the wife of a Supreme Court justice and one of Washington's most celebrated hostesses (Eve Arden) and blackmails her to help protect her son. After learning the truth about the past, Travis calls off a manhunt for Richard. Melissa comes to Lance's aid in his search for answers in Dina's death. A man who Dan thinks is a criminal turns out to be his long lost father. The truth about Dina is revealed as her killer tries to cover her tracks, starting with Lance. Jane Wyman previously worked with special guest star Eve Arden in the films Night and Day and The Lady Takes a Sailor.
164	9	"Hunter's Moon"	Reza Badiyi	Cynthia Darnell	November 27, 1987	176209	13.5/25
Lance is determined to clear his name and nail Dina’s murderer. Tony dictates that Lance, who's under the weather, check into a hospital. Lance, in spite of the poison coursing through his veins, sends Nurse Chadway (Salome Jens) to justice. Richard helps the daughter of an old friend (Lauren Hutton) and becomes responsible for helping her protect her baseball team. Angela attempts to demolish Melissa's new vineyards. Richard proposes marriage to Maggie.
165	10	"Lovers and Friends"	Michael A. Hoey	Diana Kopald Marcus	December 4, 1987	176210	13.9/25
Maggie leaves San Francisco to be with Vickie in Monte Carlo, who's upset with Richard's affair with Liz and cannot give Richard an answer to his marriage proposal. Richard offers Liz protection, when a mysterious and an eerie assassin figure begins stalking her. Angela goes forward with a plot that boomerangs on her. Melissa gives Angela a taste of her own medicine - sort of. Maggie enters her new wine in a contest and wins second place. Angela finds out that Dan's father (Robert Donner) has another family. Emma begins writing an advice column for The New Globe after Lance rescues from her from the Hollywood mogul who will not let her out of her contract.
166	11	"Across the Bridge"	Reza Badiyi	Christopher Trumbo & Merl Edelman	December 11, 1987	176211	14.3/26
Prior to Maggie returning to San Francisco with Vickie and Eric, she discovers that Richard and Liz have been traveling together. Eric notices that his gambling debts are mounting. Melissa's world begins falling apart and she experiences unusual phenomena due to Angela's hired illusionist Foster Glenn (Buck Henry). Emma's successful advice column annoys Angela, who goes to Father Bob for advice about her family.
167	12	"Twist and Shout"	Michael A. Hoey	Howard Lakin	December 18, 1987	176212	12.6/22
After learning that Maggie has finally taken Richard back, Angela and Emma throw a surprise engagement party. Wearing only a bathrobe, Melissa makes her entrance during the party looking for Lance. Lance finds out that the charming stranger that he has befriended knows secrets that could directly influence him. Melissa eavesdrops on Angela talking about her plot to drive her crazy and have her committed. M<elissa vows to show her what crazy really looks like. Richard prevents Eric from making a mistake.
168	13	"Rescue Me"	Tim Hunter	Howard Lakin	January 8, 1988	176213	15.1/26
Richard and Eric desperately search for Vickie, only to find Vickie has been abducted from the party. Dan puts his half-sister Carly (Mariska Hargitay) to work in the vineyards after he is shocked by her arrival. Shannon (Tahnee Welch) tries to disappear from the valley. Melissa turns the tables on Angela by hiring Foster Glenn to use his tricks on Angela. Angela spies on Maggie's affairs. Melissa traps Angela by getting her to reveal that she tried to drive her crazy, which turns Dan against Angela, and leaves Melissa wondering who the 'Queen of Tuscany' will be by the end of the year.
169	14	"Hornet's Nest"	Michael A. Hoey	James Fritzhand	January 15, 1988	176214	14.4/25
Angela uses Richard's absence to be near her grandson and Maggie while Richard and Eric look for Vickie overseas. Richard searches for the help of a beautiful party leader to help him save Vickie. Dan tries to help Carly but her wild free spirit tests the patience of Melissa who views the young woman as a threat to her happiness. Emma's friendliness makes her a victim for a devious couple. Shannon believes she might look for happiness with Lance, but her past crops up.
170	15	"The Uncertainty Principle"	Jeff Freilich	Cynthia Darnell	January 22, 1988	176215	15.0/27
Richard agrees to have his wedding to Maggie in the garden after Maggie finds the perfect house. Tempers flare when Eric builds up an uncomfortable dilemma at Richard's bachelor party. When Eric is willing to do a favor for Richard that might affect Maggie's future, Carly does a favor for Angela that does affect Melissa's future. Lance and Tony fight over Shannon After Angela tells Lance that Shannon had Tony's baby.
171	16	"A Madness Most Discreet"	Joseph Scanlan	Lisa Siedman	February 5, 1988	176216	14.7/25
Angela happily greets Lance with the news that Carly will be staying at Falcon Crest for a few days prior to him moving back to the mansion. In an attempt to help Emma, Curtis (Gary Imhoff) dishes the dirt on Richard. Melissa tries a complicated masquerade to helpe Emma. Richard takes on some risky help in his attempt to break the codicil to Chase's will. When Gabrielle (Cindy Morgan) returns to Tuscany Valley on the anniversary of Chase's death, she gives Maggie some encouraging news. Richard and Maggie finally marry in a private ceremony at their house. Angela, having found out about the nuptials, arrives just in time to catch the bouquet.
172	17	"Stormy Weather"	Jeff Freilich	Howard Lakin	February 12, 1988	176217	14.2/25
A severe thunderstorm turnss Angela into an unexpected hostess for Maggie, Richard, Dan, Melissa, Vickie, Eric, Garth, Curtis, and Sheriff Buckman. Emma creates a murder mystery game at Falcon Crest. Wwhen the game turns into reality at midnight, Richard becomes the prime suspect
173	18	"Legacies"	Joseph Scanlan	Diana Kopald Marcus	February 19, 1988	176218	14.5/25
When Frank Agretti (Rod Taylor) comes to Angela to help him stop the family feud with his only surviving relative, Melissa rejects her long-lost uncle. After Maggie passes the torch of her Gioberti winery over to Angela, she and Richard began their postponed honeymoon in the Caribbean, which proves not to be the perfect getaway for which she had longed. Emma seeks revenge and blames Richard for her friend's death. Melissa meddles, prior to Dan's ex-wife who is trying to reunite with him. Before Richard can seek revenge for Eric's faithlessness, Eric arranges to take Vickie and run away from the valley.
174	19	"Wheels Within Wheels"	George Kaczender	Cynthia Darnell	February 26, 1988	176219	13.8/24
Maggie's disappointments combined with Richard's hardheaded behavior began taking her on the trail of self-destruction. Richard refuses to settle with Maggie on situations that are vitally important in her new role of wife and mother, combined with Angela's visits with her grandson and Garth's well-being in their house. Lance continues to investigate the recent deaths at the manor house. Vickie and Eric learn that they have underestimated Richard. Angela awakens Melissa's curiosity about Frank's peculiar activities.
175	20	"Channing vs. Channing"	Nicholas Sgarro	Lisa Siedman	March 4, 1988	176220	14.3/26
Angela gains visitation rights to her grandson Michael following a court hearing with Judge Ambrose that angers Richard. Vickie and Eric give Maggie reassuring cards that let her know that both of them are alright. Lance gets a warning that he might be in danger as he finds an ally within the Justice Department to help pursue his investigation of Richard. Carly and Angela have a surprise party orchestrated by Carly until Richard barges in, interrupts the party, and vehemently confronts to Angela about losing her younger grandson while in the store. Angela knows from Maggie that she has a drinking problem. Especially when Frank saves Melissa from disaster, he still pays.
176	21	"False Faces"	Jeff Freilich	Rebecca Pogrow & Susan Estabrook	March 11, 1988	176221	12.1/22
Richard searches for professional help when he begins to notice the problems that he and Maggie face. Angela directs Carly to come to Melissa, when Angela places a spy in Maggie's and Richard's house, and thinks of a suit for custody of Michael. Dan refuses a loan from Angela and looks for financing for his trucking company. Lance discovers that he isn't getting the kind of help that he wanted from Kathryn (Daphne Ashbrook), while Lance and Kathryn travel to Africa in pursuit of Remick. Richard adds a movie studio to his newspaper and television holdings.
177	22	"Dirty Tricks"	Dennis Donnelly	James Fritzhand	March 18, 1988	176222	12.1/22
Maggie will look for professional help only when she will submit to her family's demands. To please Richard, she starts packing to go to a sanitarium and also takes the first step to solving her problems by consulting Dr. Everdene (Mary Ann Mobley). Richard faces up to Lance and Kathryn when Lance protects Kathryn from the anger of The Thirteen. To prevent Frank's legacy from approaching Angela, Melissa looks for help from Richard.
178	23	"Flying Blind"	Joseph Scanlan	Cynthia Darnell & Howard Lakin	April 1, 1988	176223	13.7/25
Maggie's fight in overcoming her alcohol addiction becomes more difficult after she learns Richard's role in Vickie's absence. A letter from Vickie forces her view to Richard's loving care as false. Melissa and Carly try to believe Dan against this, hence, Dan offers a chance at making enough money to start his trucking company by facing a dangerous dilemma. Angela attempts to talk Melissa into allowing a dangerous surgery for Frank. Richard tries to find a way out of his treacherous association with The Thirteen, while Angela faces Rosemont (Roscoe Lee Browne) and makes an enemy.
179	24	"The Key to Angela"	Dennis Donnelly	Howard Lakin & Lisa Seidman	April 8, 1988	176224	13.1/24
Chase's will bequeaths to Melissa "the key" to Angela when his third codicl is read at Falcon Crest. Concerned, Angela begs Lance to help her find out the secret to "the key", which she's afraid might lead to the dedestruction of her and her family's heritage. Maggie's more than happy to receive an invitation from Angela to stay at Falcon Crest until she can resolve her problems with Richard. Carly learns that Dan's priority to make money is more treacherous than she had anticipated. Richard is disappointed in his attempts to retain Vickie's and Eric's release from Switzerland, which is being blocked by The Thirteen. Melissa makes a decision about Frank's surgery.
180	25	"King's Gambit"	George Kaczender	Story by : Jeff Freilich & James Fritzhand; Teleplay by : Howard Lakin & Cynthia Darnell	April 15, 1988	176225	14.2/26
Maggie is the only one who really believes in Richard and of his admittance of his involvement with The Thirteen. Maggie comes home after she and Richard repair their relationship. Vickie comes back without Eric, as he has additional business to discuss with Madame Malec. Carly rescues her brother. Angela schemes to reunite Lance and Melissa romantically. Richard's failure to prove his innocence puts him in trouble with the government.
181	26	"Telling Tales"	Reza Badiyi	Story by : Jeff Freilich; Teleplay by : Diana Kopald Marcus & Cynthia Darnell	April 29, 1988	176226	12.9/23
Richard's underestimation of The Thirteen and their influence puts him in jeopardy, all the while, he insists on testifying before the Senate Select Committee. Madame Malec tightens her web around Eric and creates more tension between him and his wife. Dan refuses to make up with Melissa when he gets his trucking business. While Angela recommences her campaign to bring Lance and Melissa together again to get the key that could destroy Falcon Crest. Lance helps Melissa in her quest for Uncle Frank's treasure.
182	27	"As Tears Go By"	Jeff Freilich	Story by : Jeff Freilich; Teleplay by : Lisa Seidman	May 6, 1988	176227	13.2/24
Maggie asks John to testify after she thinks that Richard will chance himself for her and her children. Angela partners with Richard to face The Thirteen. Lance escorts Melissa into a cave, where she hopes to find what the key Chase gave her opens. Being brainwashed, Eric begins to carry out Rosemont's orders to framee Richardbefore the Senate Select Committee, while Lance, Vickie, and Emma testify at Richard's hearing on his behalf. Carly receives an unexpected phone call revealing her real parentage, where she learns that Dan isn't really her brother. Melissa finally finds out what her key leads to, and her reaction causes a cave-in, bringing the ceiling down on her and Lance trapping them.
183	28	"Last Dance"	Jeff Freilich	Howard Lakin	May 13, 1988	176228	14.7/26
Angela is informed by Richard of The Thirteen's plans, while Lance and Melissa are rescued from the cave. Eric shoots Angela, wounding her, when The Thirteen brainwashes Eric to murder Angela and Richard. Melissa seizes Falcon Crest from Angela and loses Lance and Frank in the process, thanks to a newly discovered deed. A few months later, Angela approaches a bearded man in the shadows of the church and asks him, "Haven't you waited long enough? When are you gonna tell Maggie you're alive?" This episode hinted at Chase Gioberti still being alive, stirring up rumours that Robert Foxworth might return. He never did.

=== Season 8 (1988–89) ===
The show focused heavily on the new cast members (Kristian Alfonso, David Beecroft, Brandon Douglas, Cástulo Guerra and Danny Nucci). Two of the former cast members (Robert Foxworth and Abby Dalton) did not return. Ana Alicia played two different characters and Jane Wyman's poor health resulted in the show's episodes being reduced from 28 to 22.

No. overall	No. in season	Title	Directed by	Written by	Original release date	Prod. code	Viewers (millions)
184	1	"Changing Times"	Michael A. Hoey	Diana Kopald Marcus	October 28, 1988	177201	20.7
As Angela shocks her family and friends with her calm retirement over losing control of the winery domain, Maggie's nightmares over Richard's death have been haunted, whereas Melissa worthlessly exercises her established power over everybody within her empire, down to the field hands and household help. While Maggie tries to deal with the anguish of his murder by the underground group, The Thirteen, she must take control over Richard's vast financial domain. After leaving for many years, after an argument with her family, Pilar Ortega, who is not only the daughter of the vineyard foreman at Falcon Crest, but is now a bank vice-president, comes back to egg on severe interest throughout the valley. Richard comes back (from the dead) and Maggie slaps him. Kristian Alfonso (Pilar) is added to the opening credits, replacing departing cast members Brett Cullen (Dan) and John Callahan (Eric). David Selby appears only in the beginning and ending of this episode.
185	2	"Farewell, My Lovelies"	George Kaczender	Cynthia Darnell	November 4, 1988	177202	17.9
Angela chooses to stay in Tuscany Valley and battle over her family's land, after Maggie is shocked by the return of her supposedly deceased husband, Richard, who gives out startling news about The Thirteen, the underground group, that was supposed to murder him, especially the son of Peter Stavros, Maggie can't figure out why she wasn't supposed to find out if Richard was alive or not. Also, Angela starts a new legal attack on Melissa for control of the Falcon Crest vineyards. Melissa's volatile behavior concerns her family, especially Lance, who gets slapped by her, before setting the Falcon Crest mansion on fire. Carly plans on leaving Tuscany Valley, while Emma begins to write an article about an enigmatic mystery writer.
186	3	"Dust to Dust"	Jerome Courtland	Stuart Rosenberg	November 11, 1988	177203	17.0
The Falcon Crest mansion is on fire, where outside, Angela must rely on Lance to plunge desperately into the flames to try to save Melissa, who is caught up inside. The aftermath of the fire has shocking results for the residents of Tuscany Valley. She was taken to the hospital and dies, and Lance flips out. Later, Angela privately arranges a meeting between Frank and his long-lost son, Nick, and grandson, Ben, (Brandon Douglas). Richard nervously embarks on a search to discover who was responsible for the assassination of The Thirteen. In search of an exclusive story, Emma secures a job typing for a private writer, R.D. Young, and later, meets his partner, Cabot (Allan Young). David Beecroft (Nick) is added to the opening credits, replacing departing cast member Dana Sparks (Vickie).
187	4	"Jeopardy"	Dennis Donnelly	Kathy McCormick	November 18, 1988	177204	17.6
Senator Ryder is planning on shooting Richard, whilst kidnapping his wife, Maggie. Aware that Senate Ryder's brother, John is behind the assassination of The Thirteen, Richard learns the secret method of which Ryder and John could keep in touch with each other. When Richard waits in a park for John, he has no idea that the senator has already murdered his brother, while at Richard's house. Ana Alicia is removed from the opening credits, she would return in a recurring role as a Melissa look-a-like later in the season. Jane Wyman does not appear in this episode, the script was reworked after she tripped over a cable in rehearsal and hurt herself.
188	5	"Tuscany Venus"	Jerome Courtland	Michael Halperin	December 2, 1988	177205	17.6
District Attorney Field angrily refuses to receive Angela's help for the governorship, in exchange for dropping all murder charges against Lance, when Richard tries to hire Field's leukemic son to join the staff of The New Globe, Fields agrees to his deal. Lance, however, is ungrateful, he wanted to plead his innocence in court. Despite not charged with any crime, Maggie's conscious is guilty when she indeed murdered Senator Ryder, especially when she did that in order to save her husband's life. After Nick is pleased when he suspects Pilar swimming nude, Angela relays to him that she has gained knowledgeable information he's not supposed to be released, recognizing that the price for keeping the secret is Falcon Crest itself. Jane Wyman returns, however she remains seated for the entire episode because of her injury.
189	6	"Liars Anonymous"	Kate Swofford Tilley	Gary Stephens & Julie Moskowitz	December 9, 1988	177206	17.7
Nick yields Falcon Crest to Angela, when she blackmails Nick with incriminating clues about his past life. As Angela arranges to rebuild the entire house, Nick makes a mistake about his respect towards her and cautions that he will not bend from then on. Nick has to tell Ben the truth about his mother, that angers him. Richard's newspaper prints the truth that Melissa had placed a phone call after Lance's exit, meaning that Lance is innocent of her death. Richard cautions Pilar not to allow her affair with Lance interfere with Richard's taking over the valley. When Frank's old friend, Libby comes back, Nick and Ben are stunned. Libby asks Frank to join her in Columbia to dig up for emeralds, that is the offer that bothers Angela. As Emma and Cabot begin a serious relationship, Cabot asks her true identity.
190	7	"Life with Father"	Nicholas Sgarro	Amy Tebo	December 16, 1988	177207	16.0
Frank overthinks over whether or not to leave his family to dig up emeralds with Libby, when Christmas arrives in Tuscany Valley. Ben goes against Nick for lying to him about his mother. Not aware of Richard's assistance, Maggie is aware with the overwhelming response to her special advertising offer. Richard tries to back Pilar's failing consortium through a blind company for a managing interest. When Daniel learns Emma's true identity, he turns his back on her. Even if Angela celebrates the holiday surrounding herself with family, Pilar's holiday is ruined when she approaches her brothers Tommy and Paco being chased by security officers. Eventually, Christmas dinner at Pilar's home draws the relationship of Nick and Ben closer together and Nick to admit, the love of his father.
191	8	"Solomon's Choice"	Joseph Scanlan	Cynthia Darnell	January 6, 1989	177208	17.9
Pilar is pressured when she is to sign paper allowing Mercedes and her husband to adopt Lisa. However, Pilar notices that Mercedes is the only mother the child has ever known, the thought of the last, legal adoption is more than Pilar can bear. Pilar finds Lance with an attractive young lady, after she goes to Lance for comfort. Angela is bound to learn who is responsible for the consortium, after she is outfoxed for the purchase of a bottling company. Emma learns that Cabot has been lying to her relating to his true identity, after Maggie's newspaper office is mysteriously discarded, a few days before the first edition.
192	9	"Suspicion"	Jerome Courtland	Linda Elstad	January 13, 1989	445059	16.7
Angela is pleased when Emma brings up her plan to marry R.D. Young, however, her plans for the wedding intimidate Young's passion for privacy. Being shut out by Lance's relationship with Cookie Nash, Pilar turns to Nick for comfort. More to the point, Angela learns that Tommy was there when her newspaper office was discarded, she must choose whether or not Tommy gets another chance.
193	10	"There Goes the Bride"	Joseph Scanlan	Stephen Black & Henry Stern	January 20, 1989	445060	19.5
Angela's anticipated approach to Emma's imminent wedding may prove fruitless when the bride and groom call the festivities off. When Angela receives word from her daughter, Emma, that the wedding is off, her forthcoming bridegroom, R.D. Young, apologizes for his behavior and announces that the wedding is on schedule again. During the wedding rehearsals, Young's anxieties elevate, and he encourages Emma to elope. Lance's & Pilar's romances resumes, after Pilar accepted Lance's apology about Cookie Nash. Nick unsuccessfully suggests to Ben, that he curtail his relations with the Cellini Family, despite cautioning him that the family is dangerous. An unexpected visitor causes a crisis at Tuscany Valley.
194	11	"True Confessions"	Nicholas Sgarro	Rena Down	February 3, 1989	445061	17.8
For the ongoing battle to prevent Angela, off-balance, Pilar calms her about the consortium, while continuing to scheme with Richard. Despite the stir created by her return from Italy, Anna Cellini is pleased to have a reunion with Ben. However, it is intimidated that her father will interfere his son's life by urging that his only surviving grandchild and heir be a product of Italy. Richard is actually ready in Chicago with Pilar for meetings with financier, Malcolm Sinclair, when he tells Maggie he was in New York. Lance receives word from Cookie that she's pregnant with his child. Margaret Ladd (Emma) is removed from the opening credits, she would return later in the season.
195	12	"And Baby Makes Three"	Shelley Levinson	Stephen Black & Henry Stern	February 10, 1989	445062	17.4
While Angela recommences to release information about the consortium, Lance awaits on the surprising news from Pilar. Angela confronts Richard, when she follows the paper trail leading from the consortium to his company. Nick and Anna have been in harmony about Ben. This episode ends with Pilar dropping the bombshell piece of news on Lance – he is Lisa's father.
196	13	"Dinner at Eight"	Robert Becker	Joel Okmin & Michael Filerman	February 17, 1989	445063	18.2
Lance refuses to marry Cookie, much to the pressure of Angela, as he gives her full financial support. Angela accidentally unveils Richard's duplicity in the Troilus affair. Happiness seems noticed for the reunited family, this is where Anna and Nick revive their love. But Anna continues to keep the facts of her fatal illness, herself, while Ben receives a card from Frank, his grandfather, telling his grandson that the emerald mine is coming through. Pilar has made herself perfectly clear to both Sinclair and Richard that she will trust with whoever makes it most worth her while. Sinclair's marriage proposal comes three years overdue for Pilar, who refuses. However, she's more than happy to accept Lance's proposal to become his wife.
197	14	"Uneasy Allies"	Nicholas Sgarro	Greg Stephens & Julie Moskowitz	March 3, 1989	445064	17.0
Much to Mrs. Channing's undoubtedly antagonism, Lance and Pilar decide to marry. Maggie disgusted at Richard's plans for the valley, separates him. Angela makes a deal with Sinclair, telling Lance that Pilar knows very much of Richard's business dealings, in hopes to prevent Lance and Pilar's marriage. On the other hand, Pilar encourages him otherwise, and the wedding is absolutely on. Nick encourages Anna to want him and Ben to care for her, provided that Ben can't be told of her illness, after Nick finds out about the seriousness of Anna's disease. The gang leaves them unconscious on the roadside, when Raoul and his gang run Ben and Gabriel off the road.
198	15	"The Vigil"	Joe Coppoletta	Linda Elstad	March 10, 1989	445065	16.2
Richard tries reconciling with Maggie, when she rejects him, causing unexpected results. Lance and Pilar return home immediately, after hearing about the car crash. Anna feels guilty over having bestowing Ben the car, when he and Gabriel are both in serious condition. While the hospital staff blames about Gabriel, being accepted, he has a seizure, where he must have surgery. In reluctance to accept the marriage, Angela invites Lance and Pilar, the newlyweds, to live at Falcon Crest. At the response of Maggie's rejection, Richard demands a court order that transfers custody of the boys to him. Escorted by the Sheriff, Richard releases the children from Falcon Crest.
199	16	"Missing Links"	Michael Preece	Stephen Black & Henry Stern	March 17, 1989	445066	16.3
Depressed at his mother's disappearance, Michael runs away. Richard moves to stop Angela's latest power play, while Frank Agretti returns to San Francisco. Richard prepares to fasten Angela's wings determined in the matter of Glenraddoch, while Angela is prepared to help Maggie seizes custody of Richard's children. Michael's running away brings worriness, falls down in the tunnel. In spite of all that harassing, Richard calls Maggie, who also calls Angela, in pursuit of looking for their son. Frank returns to Tuscany Valley, after observing from Ben's accident, while Lance and Pilar agree to try to make their welcome at Falcon Crest. Before Angela travels to Chicago, to help an ill person, she asks Lance to take care of Falcon Crest, for taking care of Maggie if Richard gives her a hard time, he agrees.
200	17	"Resurrection"	Jerome Courtland	Rena Down	March 31, 1989	445067	16.7
The Ortegas are in a crisis, when they learn Gabriel has epilepsy, right after the accident that he suffered a head injury. Anna (in desperation) tries to encourage Frank and Nick to help her pain be over, prior to growing increasingly weaker. Stating his true feelings for Maggie, Tommy consoles her, after Maggie breaks down into tears, after a phone conversation with Michael. When Lance has been meaning to call Angela, about the Glenbraddoch meeting (when all the phone lines were down), Angela calls Lance, instead, and asks him to plant the Chardonnay, before the week is over and it could be too late, because of the changing weather. Also, on the same business trip that Angela is away, Richard approaches a beautiful young lady who is the dead ringer for Melissa Agretti. Pretending that it'll help an ailing Angela, Richard encourages his new invasion, Samantha Ross, to come back to San Francisco, while impersonating Melissa. After Richard approves to pay her a heavy price, the deal is mutual. The show's 200th episode. Ana Alicia returns as Melissa's look-a-like Samantha Ross in a recurring role until the end of the season.
201	18	"Enquiring Minds"	Peter Ellis	Stephen Black & Henry Stern	April 7, 1989	445068	16.2
While Pilar and Sinclair scheme against Richard, who continue to plot against Angela, while Nick investigates the background of a phony document. Lance is very unaware that he has been observed by Pilar, when he learns there's one deed too many in Angela's safe, who also burns the document. Pilar has been partnering with Sinclair to understate Richard in his latest investigation by the S.E.C. Richard misinterprets Tommy's well-being in Maggie's hotel suite. Samantha helps Angela to get out of one of Richard's plots.
202	19	"Grand Delusions"	Reza Badiyi	Mark Edens	April 14, 1989	445069	16.4
Angela finds her family doubting her kidnapping story, after being escaped with Samantha's help, when Pilar gains Angela's confidence with her plan to help her restoring control of the Glenbraddoch stock. At the hearing, Richard gains custody of his children. Angela approves to prevent Samantha from Richard's wrath and calls Lance to give her a ride in his car in San Francisco. The bottom line is Samantha vanishes before he shows up. Richard plays a tape that has been edited to indict both her and Sinclair and which will release Richard, who obtains a warrant ordering Angela into custody for a psychiatric evaluation to determine her mental competency.
203	20	"Ties That Bind"	Joe Coppoletta	Lee Schneider	May 5, 1989	445070	16.4
Angela has been harassed by other patients, prior to undergoing observation in the psychiatric ward. Richard gains victorious in gaining custody of the kids and begins to have doubts about his relationship with Samantha, when Ben becomes really discouraged over Anna's death, who also watches a late movie with Andrea. There he gets drunk, comes home late and lies to his father. Maggie shows the hospital's neglectful treatment of Gabriel, while Nick continues his plans to retain Falcon Crest, who still orders Ben to tell him the truth, who still doesn't get it. When he runs away from his father's ground rules, Nick grounds him. Richard deceives Samantha into leaving for Paris. At Angela's judicial review, her behavior gets so melodramatic that could indicate harm to her case.
204	21	"The Last Laugh"	Lorraine Senna Ferrara	Rena Down	May 12, 1989	445071	16.4
Even while Angela's competency hearing continues, it's undoubtedly aware that her case is weak, who constantly gets too melodramatic, because Richard stated that he put his mother in the psychiatric ward and makes plans for her to return home to get the best of care, through him. Maggie's standing begins to downplay because of rumors about her involvement with Tommy. Recognizing of Ben, who ran off on his father, Nick already grounded him, but Frank invites his grandson and Nick, for a fishing trip, when Ben chooses not to go. Frank learns that the feud between the Agrettis and the Giobertis had begun when the name of Falcon Crest switched hands during a crooked card game, he tries to encourage Nick to allow sleeping dogs lie. Thanks to Frank's somewhat low-key encouragement to Ben, he makes up with Nick. Pilar proposes to embark on a trauma center in the Ortega name, with her words, especially banishment for everybody, who's in Gabriel's case, after selling a few of her recently bought Glenbraddoch stock to Lance. Angela shakes the court with a surprise revelation.
205	22	"Decline and Fall"	Jerome Courtland	Stephen Black & Henry Stern	May 19, 1989	445072	17.1
For Angela to marry Frank Agretti, she had triumphantly disappointed Richard's plans, she also returns to Falcon Crest, where her family gathers to her side and plans have come up for Richard's complete downfall. Richard tells Samantha to lose their partnership, or she'll have to pay the consequences, all the while Samantha returns from Paris to Chicago. However, when Samantha finally goes to Falcon Crest, she gives proof that Richard was responsible for Angela's kidnapping, right at the same time, Angela and Pilar work with the S.E.C. to make smooth of Richard's financial ruin. Kelly, hearing the many lies from Tommy about his relationship with Maggie, she breaks him up, tries to rescue her, who then drowns in the lake. The season ended, when Angela confronts Richard about putting his mother in the psychiatric ward, hence, she calls the police, who has him arrested. Margaret Ladd (Emma) returns to the opening credits.

=== Season 9 (1989–90) ===
This is the final season of Falcon Crest and the only season in which Jane Wyman does not appear in nearly every episode, due to her ongoing health problems. The show went into a different direction by adding 2 new cast members (Gregory Harrison and Wendy Phillips), who replaced Susan Sullivan. Against her doctors' orders, Jane Wyman appeared for the show's final 3 episodes.

No. overall	No. in season	Title	Directed by	Written by	Original release date	Prod. code	Viewers (millions)
206	1	"The Price of Freedom"	Jerry Thorpe	Joel Surnow & Cyrus Nowrasteh	September 29, 1989	445651	15.1
As Angela prepares to travel to Greece, she leaves her grandson Lance in charge, though under the strict supervision of her reliable foreman, Frank Agretti (Rod Taylor). Since Daniel Cabot, an unsuccessful author, has turned to gambling, drinking and brutality, Emma has become a battered wife. To escape her troubles, Emma turns to another man, Charley, for much-needed affection. In an effort to get out of prison, Richard decides to testify against his co-conspirator, Michael Sharpe (Gregory Harrison). Richard evades an attempt on his life meant to stop his testimony. Accidentally getting her finger stuck in a pool drain, Maggie drowns. Angela hires a private investigator to tail Pilar. Rod Taylor (Frank) and Gregory Harrison (Michael) are added to the opening credits, replacing departing cast members David Beecroft (Nick) and Susan Sullivan (Maggie), who returns in a guest role to finish out her storyline.
207	2	"Charley"	Reza Badiyi	Alan Moskowitz	October 6, 1989	445652	14.4
Emma's old friend Charley St. James (Mark Lindsay Chapman) arrives just in time for Maggie's funeral, where, Charley removed Maggie's wedding ring. Even when Angela disapproves of Charley and changes her vacation plans, Emma stands by Charley despite Angela's interference. Michael Sharpe takes his revenge on Richard for his testimony against him by having Richard's children removed from his custody. Aware that Angela is trying to break up his relationship with Emma, Charley places a pillow over Angela's face and suffocates her. Behind-the-scenes, Jane Wyman had collapsed on set on February 20, 1989 and was rushed to hospital where she was advised by doctors to avoid working. Although Wyman remained in the opening credits of every episode, her character was placed in a coma until the final three episodes of the season, with executive producer Jerry Thorpe stating in TV Guide at the time: "We wanted to take the show in a new direction while at the same time lightening her load a little."
208	3	"Flesh and Blood"	Robert Scheerer	Sheri Anderson	October 13, 1989	445653	15.4
After Chao-Li returns from vacation, he went up to Angela's room, where she was found unconscious. The Channings are in a crisis where Angela was rushed into a hospital, only to be slipped in a coma. Lance has a hard time managing Falcon Crest without Angela, especially when business associates urge on negotiating with his grandmother; but fortunately, Pilar is happy to help Lance with Ned Vogel (David Spielberg). Richard learns that Michael was an asset in Richard's custody loss over his own children, who delivered them to Walker (Robert Ginty) and Lauren Daniels, the emotional couple who lost their own children. When Charley exploded the back-up generator in the hospital basement, The Channings have no choice other than to pull the plug on Angela's life-support. Richard still mourns for Maggie, and must keep all of his promises that have been made by her. Wendy Phillips (Lauren) is added to the opening credits.
209	4	"Payback"	Reza Badiyi	Robert Cochran	October 20, 1989	445654	15.8
With his continued influence over Emma, Charley upsets the family. After the bank calls in its loan, Richard saves Falcon Crest from Michael Sharpe. Encouraged by his sister-in-law, Genele Ericson (Andrea Thompson), Frank Agretti goes to the bank with the power of attorney which Angela had given him prior to her aborted trip to Europe and takes over operation of Falcon Crest.
210	5	"Soul Sacrifice"	Jerome Courtland	Sheri Anderson & Alan Moskowitz	November 3, 1989	445655	14.1
Due to Richard's testimony, the S.E.C. slaps Michael Sharpe with the largest fine in history. Lauren and Walker confront Michael about his schemes and their custody of Richard's children. Frank's obsession with the treacherous Genele escalates. Charley is relieved to hear that Emma's husband has apparently committed suicide, since his death removes the last obstacle for Charley to marry Emma. When the court gives control of Falcon Crest to Emma, she is overwhelmed by the notion of running the business. Emma's new husband Charley, however, has many ideas about running Falcon Crest.
211	6	"God of the Grape"	Reza Badiyi	Colleen Carroll	November 10, 1989	445656	13.9
Charley hires his brother Ian and his young, childlike wife, Sidney (Carla Gugino), to help run the winery. Since the new arrivals put Charley at odds with Lance, the two fight. After Lance soundly beats Charley, Charley immediately fires him. Richard is still grieving for Maggie, and says he lost everything, especially Falcon Crest. When Michael was questioning Lauren about Richard getting his kids back, Walker wanted Michael out of their house and put his back against the wall. Michael doesn't care about anybody, except for himself, even when he brought Lauren, even more pain. After rescuing his sons, Richard learns that they liked Walker's wife and returns them to Lauren's care, despite the fact that she is Sharpe's sister. Pilar and Lance confront Emma about Charley, he throws a bacchanal party, which is crashed by bikers. Ned Vogel, who has taped evidence of Pilar securing his distribution contract through sexual favors, blackmails her. At Angela's bedside, Emma thinks she hears her comatose mother command her to get rid of Charley, but Emma isn't sure whether or not she imagined it.
212	7	"Doctor Dollars"	Jerome Courtland	Cyrus Nowrasteh	November 17, 1989	445657	13.8
As Michael Sharpe arranges for Richard to be killed, the contract eventually goes to Sal, Richard's acquaintance from prison. Instead of killing Richard, Sal offers to help him get back at Sharpe, but later pays with his life when Sharpe learns that Sal double-crossed him. After Sydney defies her husband and befriends Emma, Ian beats her. In order to get rid of Lance, Charley shows him a videotape of Pilar's liaison with Ned Vogel. Despite Pilar's pleas, Lance leaves enraged, just as Charley had hoped.
213	8	"Luck Wave"	Lorraine Senna Ferrara	Paul & Sharon Boorstin	December 1, 1989	445658	14.4
Michael Sharpe convinces Ian and Charley to sell Falcon Crest to him, but Emma backs out. When Sharpe informs Ian and Charley that he has information on them that could put them in jail, Charley agrees to kill Emma and forge her signature. Charley is stopped in his tracks, however, when an unsuspecting Emma informs him that she is pregnant. Lance becomes embroiled in a deadly game of Russian roulette involving scorpions.
214	9	"Merry Christmas, Charley"	Jerome Courtland	Joel Surnow & Cyrus Nowrasteh	December 8, 1989	445659	14.1
Charley keeps the pressure on Emma to sell to Sharpe, despite the fact that she is pregnant. After Charley tells Ian about Sydney's affair with Chris Agretti at the winery, the two brothers agree to kill their wives for deceiving them. Lauren gives Walker permission to sleep with her, then, later, she nearly slaps him, after taking out all that anger on her. Richard lets Lauren know how much she means to him. After Frank sees Sydney and Ian in a struggle, he tries to help, but when Ian gets the upper hand, Sydney saves Frank by killing Ian with a letter opener. Charley chases after Emma, but Emma shoots him in the chest.
215	10	"Danny"	Peter Ellis	Thomas J. Spath	December 15, 1989	445660	14.4
With a bullet wound in the chest, Charley disappears from Falcon Crest. Because Chris Agretti is missing, Sydney worries that Ian and Charley might have killed him. Sharpe gains control of Falcon Crest by threatening to press criminal charges against Emma for authorizing the release of tainted wine, she leaves Falcon Crest to live in peace. Sharpe's son Danny (David Sheinkopf) provides his father with crucial evidence, which he found while on a date with Sydney. Richard suspects that Lauren's marital situation is worsening, while Lance resists renewing a sexual relationship with Pilar.
216	11	"Time Bomb"	Jerome Courtland	Robert Cochran	January 5, 1990	445661	14.8
As payback for Jace Sampson's cooperation in Sharpe's takeover of Falcon Crest, Richard talks Jace into making an investment after which Jace loses all his money. Pilar and Lance's estrangement worsens. After Walker catches Richard and Lauren kissing, he confronts them with dynamite strapped to his chest, which is set to go off when the timer runs out. Rather than kill Lauren and the boys along with Richard, Walker runs outside just as the dynamite explodes, as is Walker. Andrea Thompson (Genele) is added to the opening credits, replacing departing cast member Margaret Ladd (Emma).
217	12	"Madness Descending"	Peter Ellis	Alan Moskowitz	January 12, 1990	445662	14.6
When Genele forces Frank out of his own home in order to entertain her lover Sharpe, Frank delivers the remains of Genele's sister and Frank's ex-wife Renee to the police, informing them that Genele killed her ten years before. Sydney tries to push Pilar and Lance back together. Sharpe is displeased when Lauren moves in with Richard after her ordeal with Walker. Sharpe tries to act as a business mentor for Danny.
218	13	"Four Women"	Jerome Courtland	Joel Surnow & Cyrus Nowrasteh	January 19, 1990	445663	14.7
Haunted by the memory of her husband's death, Lauren moves out of Richard's place and in with Genele. When Danny invites Sydney for a romantic night on his father's yacht, Sydney maneuvers to put Lance and Pilar on the boat together instead. When Sharpe uses sensitive information about Richard's business dealings, he makes $300 million, and Richard loses $52 million. Richard wrongfully accuses Lauren of leaking the information. After showing up at Richard's door, Genele removes her clothes. Rod Taylor (Frank) is removed from the opening credits.
219	14	"Brotherly Love"	Peter Ellis	Frank V. Furino	February 2, 1990	445664	14.1
Danny fights Sharpe's attempts to control his life and to make him break up with Sydney. After Sydney brings them back together, Lance and Pilar make plans to retake control of Falcon Crest. When Richard learns through Pilar that Genele was responsible for delivering his business secrets to Sharpe, he throws Genele out and attempts to reconcile with Lauren. Realizing that her brother's affection for her is more than just brotherly, Lauren decides she has to leave Sharpe's house. Chao-Li Chi (Chao-Li) is removed from the opening credits, he would return later in the season.
220	15	"Finding Lauren"	Jerome Courtland	Joel Surnow & Cyrus Nowrasteh	February 16, 1990	445665	13.0
Richard and Sharpe search for Lauren, who had grown tired of their fighting and ran off to work as a waitress in a diner. Sharpe attempts to convince Danny to drop Sydney, who wants Falcon Crest to return to the Channing's. When Lance and Pilar ask Sharpe what it would take for him to sell them Falcon Crest, Sharpe tells them to break up Sydney and Danny. When Lauren returns to Richard and the boys, she has to deal with Richard's continuing obsession with his dead wife Maggie.
221	16	"Walking Money"	Tim Hunter	Thomas J. Spath	February 23, 1990	445666	14.0
After Genele intercepts stolen bonds that Sharpe is trafficking, she arranges for Richard to cash them. Lance, Pilar and Danny believe that things are finally turning around for the winery. Genele has to pay hush money to a witness, but Richard has decided to keep all the money as revenge for Genele's past deceit. When Richard has the bonds cashed under the name Sharpe, Sharpe assumes his son Danny did it under Sydney's influence. After Sharpe tampers with Sydney's car, Danny happens to borrow her car and ends up in crash.
222	17	"Vigil"	Jerome Courtland	David Ehrman	March 9, 1990	445667	12.5
Danny has a severe head injury as a result of crashing Sydney's car, which Sharpe had tampered with to get at Sydney. Danny's mother, Anne Bowen, and Sharpe decide to approve a dangerous operation to remove a bone shard from Danny's spinal cord. Discouraged by the bad luck she seems to bring to all her boyfriends, Sydney leaves Falcon Crest. Suspecting that Sharpe was behind the car crash, Richard and Lance track down the auto mechanic, Sacco, who did the tampering. Alerted to Richard and Lance's involvement, Sharpe sends his chauffeur Nick to ensure that Sacco doesn't talk.
223	18	"Dark Streets"	Peter Ellis	Robert Cochran	March 16, 1990	445668	11.8
Lauren tries to persuade Anne to reconcile with Sharpe. Anne and Lauren work to create an understanding between Sharpe and Richard, but once the women leave, Sharpe and Richard each vow to find the mechanic Sharpe hired to tamper with Sydney's car. Pilar disguises herself as a homeless woman to win the trust of Sacco's girlfriend, who leads Pilar to Sacco. Sharpe's henchman, Nick, follows both of them. However, when Nick is about to shoot Sacco, Lance disarms him from behind. With the informant they need to wrest Falcon Crest from Sharpe, Pilar and Lance call Richard.
224	19	"Crimes of the Past"	Robert Scheerer	Alan Moskowitz	April 26, 1990	445669	11.2
Richard knows that Sharpe was behind the sabotage that almost killed his son, Danny, and he has Johnny Sacco, the mechanic paid to tamper with Sydney's car, to prove it. In order to keep Danny and his estranged wife Anne from knowing his involvement in the accident, Sharpe transfers ownership of Falcon Crest to Richard. After Anne agrees to give her marriage with Sharpe a second chance, she changes her mind when Johnny Sacco arrives intoxicated at the Sharpe residence and tells Anne everything. Anne lets Sharpe in on a secret she's kept for 21 years: Richard is Danny's real father.
225	20	"The Return"	Peter Ellis	Joel Surnow	May 3, 1990	445670	10.6
Richard is determined to become the owner of Falcon Crest, who used Lance and Pilar to get everything back, and tosses them aside. Richard has a conversation with his nephew about Lance managing the place, while his uncle owns it, who says if Lance doesn't like the arrangement, Richard has to find somebody else, who does. Tired of Richard's slamming down orders in front of them, Lance and Pilar were on their way to pay a visit to see his grandmother, when, in Mrs. Channing's hospital room, the bed was empty, after the nurse and the orderly cleaned up, a week ago, as they both received word from the nurse that Angela woke up from her coma. Sharpe reels from the news that his hated rival Richard is Danny's father. Richard's plans to run the winery with Lauren run into a snag when Angela returns to Falcon Crest, after a yearlong hospitalization. When Richard informs Angela that she has no legal claim to the winery, Angela pretends to give in, but she is secretly planning to block Richard's marriage to Lauren with the help of Michael Sharpe. Against her doctor's advice, Jane Wyman finally returned to Falcon Crest at the end of this episode, after a 16 episode hiatus. Chao-Li Chi (Chao-Li) also returns to the opening credits.
226	21	"Danny's Song"	Cyrus Nowrasteh	Joel Surnow & Cyrus Nowrasteh	May 10, 1990	445671	12.5
After Danny learns that Richard is his father, he goes to Sharpe to tell him it doesn't matter, but Sharpe throws him out of his office and tells him that they should go their separate ways. Because Danny has no job and nowhere to live, Lauren invites him to live with her and Richard, but Richard wants nothing to do with Danny. After witnessing this callous side of Richard, Lauren considers calling off their wedding. When Danny threatens suicide, however, Richard and Sharpe agree to help him, which reassures Lauren. With the wedding back on schedule, Angela must find another way to stop it.
227	22	"Home Again"	Reza Badiyi	Robert Cochran	May 17, 1990	445672	12.3
As Richard and Lauren enjoy their wedding at the winery, Richard agrees to sell Falcon Crest back to Angela on the condition that half will go to his sons in the event of her death. Lance, however, will receive ten percent now and the remainder after Angela's death. As the wedding reception draws to a close, Angela recalls all the people who passed through Tuscany Valley during the last decade and toasts the future of Falcon Crest.

== Ratings ==
Falcon Crest : U.S. viewers per episode (millions)

Season	Episode number																														Average
Season	1	2	3	4	5	6	7	8	9	10	11	12	13	14	15	16	17	18	19	20	21	22	23	24	25	26	27	28	29	30	Average
1	21.8	20.1	19.0	15.7	23.8	22.6	21.5	23.6	20.3	22.0	21.2	25.2	22.2	19.9	19.9	22.2	22.0	21.4	–												21.4
2	19.3	20.3	15.9	22.0	19.1	20.4	20.4	19.0	22.8	20.8	21.5	16.6	23.2	22.7	21.9	23.8	20.1	15.4	22.1	21.5	22.5	23.7	–								20.7
3	23.4	19.8	19.4	22.2	21.3	23.3	23.3	23.7	21.1	23.0	24.4	22.0	21.4	22.5	21.5	21.5	21.7	22.1	23.9	21.7	21.7	21.0	23.0	21.8	20.5	22.0	23.3	23.7	–		22.0
4	23.4	20.0	18.5	19.4	19.9	21.9	21.1	20.5	18.8	21.1	20.7	20.4	18.4	21.2	21.5	21.8	20.0	20.1	20.3	19.4	20.2	17.5	17.6	19.2	18.5	16.9	18.3	19.1	22.0	16.4	19.9
5	19.3	18.0	17.8	17.9	19.2	17.8	18.9	19.5	17.4	18.6	19.7	18.1	18.8	18.3	19.1	18.5	18.0	18.0	17.4	16.8	17.4	16.8	16.5	17.2	17.1	16.9	16.5	18.8	17.9	–	18.1
6	17.0	15.2	17.5	16.9	15.6	17.7	18.8	18.1	17.6	18.4	16.6	19.1	17.4	20.2	17.4	17.7	16.5	16.5	17.4	17.4	17.1	16.4	16.0	16.7	17.4	17.2	16.5	18.6	–		17.3
7	15.1	16.4	15.1	14.9	15.1	14.6	14.4	14.2	13.5	13.9	14.3	12.6	15.1	14.4	15.0	14.7	14.2	14.5	13.8	14.3	12.1	12.1	13.7	13.1	14.2	12.9	13.2	14.7	–		14.1
8	20.7	17.9	17.0	17.6	17.6	17.7	16.0	17.9	16.7	19.5	17.8	17.4	18.2	17.0	16.2	16.3	16.7	16.2	16.4	16.4	16.4	17.1	–								17.3
9	15.1	14.4	15.4	15.8	14.1	13.9	13.8	14.4	14.1	14.4	14.8	14.6	14.7	14.1	13.0	14.0	12.5	11.8	11.2	10.6	12.5	12.3	–								13.7

Audience measurement performed by Nielsen Media Research
