= Angela Channing =

- Falcon Crest character
- Portrayed by: Jane Wyman
- First appearance: "In His Father's House" (1981)
- Last appearance: "Home Again" (1990)
- Created by: Earl Hamner
In-universe information
- Occupation: Owner of: Falcon Crest Winery; The San Francisco Globe newspaper; Tuscany Downs; Del Oro Spa and Country Club
- Father: Jasper Gioberti Jr.
- Mother: Lilly Gioberti, née Travers
- Brothers: Jason Gioberti
- Half-sisters: Francesca Gioberti
- Spouse: Douglas Channing (divorced); Phillip Erikson (widowed); Peter Stavros (divorced); Frank Agretti (divorced)
- Sons: Richard Channing
- Daughters: Julia Channing Cumson; Emma Channing
- Grandsons: Christopher Rossini; Lance Cumson; Michael Channing; Kevin Gioberti Channing (through adoption by Richard Channing); Danny Sharpe
- Granddaughters: Angela
- Grandfathers: Joseph Gioberti
- Grandmothers: Tessa Gioberti, née Lindstrom
- Nephews: Chase Gioberti; Cole Gioberti; Kevin Gioberti; Joseph Gioberti
- Nieces: Vickie Gioberti; Hope Gioberti

Angela Channing (maiden name Gioberti; formerly Erickson, Stavros and Agretti) is a fictional character on the American prime time soap opera Falcon Crest, portrayed by Jane Wyman from 1981 to 1990. A principal character of the series, Angela is the devious, tyrannical owner of the Falcon Crest winery in fictional Tuscany Valley, California, whose schemes to advance the fortunes of her family company while keeping sole control over it drive the action of the series. Wyman won a Golden Globe Award for Best Actress in a Television Drama Series for the role in 1984.

== Appearances ==
Wyman originated the role of Angela in the December 1981 first episode "In His Father's House", remaining until the series finale episode "Home Again" in May 1990. Wyman appeared in 208 of the series' 227 episodes, missing two episodes in season five ("Law and Ardor" and "Hidden Meanings") and 17 episodes in season nine due to health problems.

== Casting and production ==
Wyman, who won an Academy Award in 1948 for her role in the film Johnny Belinda, largely retired from acting in 1962 at age 45, though she appeared in guest roles on several television series in the 1960s and 1970s. For 19 years, only Falcon Crest lured her back to full-time employment. Wyman was initially undecided about taking the role, which was so different from the "self-sacrificing" characters she had previously played. She said:

I read the pilot script for Falcon Crest and all of a sudden, it just struck a bell. I thought, 'Well, I've always done the four-handkerchief bits'—you know, everybody walking outside and saying, 'Wasn't it marvelous?' ... Angie Channing is a very heads-up lady, so why don't we just go ahead and play her? I really like her. A lot. She's very much a 1981 kind of lady. You just can't miss on a thing like this. You really can't. If you do, you're dumb.

Falcon Crest creator Earl Hamner Jr. offered Wyman the role. She said, "I told him I'd heard Barbara Stanwyck had turned it down. And he said that was an untrue rumor. It had never been offered to her." Hamner said he was looking for a "sympathetic actress" for the role. He called Wyman "one of the legendary stars ... a great actress", and insisted that though she was the ex-wife of recently elected US President Ronald Reagan, her casting had nothing to do with her connection to Reagan. Hamner said Wyman was chosen to add credibility to the role, and noted "The character is a harsh one. Miss Wyman's nice-lady image gives Angie more dimension and sympathy."

After shooting the original pilot episode of the series, called The Vintage Years and featuring Wyman in a silver wig, the actress pushed for changes in Angela. Hamner had warned Wyman that the press would call Angela a female J. R. Ewing, the amoral oil baron from Falcon Crest's lead-in series, Dallas, played by Larry Hagman. Not wanting her character to simply be a J.R. clone, Wyman said, "I feel I'm representing all women in business. I may come off as a hard, tough character, but I want Angie to show she's also capable of love." She said, "I remade my character", and explained:

After I told them I was plenty old enough and had enough gray hair without putting on that dreadful wig, I decided to do something about Angela. Not only was she too mean and vicious, she was just plain boring. I wanted Angie to be an interesting character. She's a tough-as-nails businesswoman in every sense of the word, but the trouble with the pilot was that she was just too nasty.

Journalist Claudia Luther wrote that "the role gave Wyman an opportunity to break away from her nice-girl image and play a female power broker intent on ruling over her family of winemakers at whatever cost."

Wyman chose her character's wardrobe personally. She said that Angela "wore only the best", and noted, "I like sexy and very female clothes."

Wyman underwent abdominal surgery in early January 1986, missing five weeks of production and subsequently not appearing in two episodes of season five. By the end of season five, Wyman was reportedly earning $3 million a year.

== Characterization ==
Wyman said that Angela "runs everything. She goes straight through everything like a Mack truck." The character, positioned as "a Napa Valley winery owner who maintained her power with a steely will", has been described as "icy", "vicious", "domineering", "formidable", "ruthless", "conniving", "wily", "power-mad", "villainous", "backstabbing", "a female tyrant", and as "an iron-fisted matriarch who will let nothing stop her quest for power and goes head-to-head with anyone trying to gain control of the coveted Falcon Crest Vineyards."

Jamey Giddens of Daytime Confidential called Angela "the most cunning, lethal, downright venomous one of them all" among prime time soap opera villainesses from the 1980s, and described her as "the indominable Angela, a woman wouldn't think twice about stabbing her own children, grandchildren, nieces and nephews in the back if it meant maintaining control of her grandfather's legacy, Falcon Crest." Angela runs the winery and her family "with the precision of a drill sergeant", and is "feared, loathed and respected" by everyone in the Tuscany Valley. According to her nemesis Richard Channing (David Selby), Angela tells more lies "than the devil himself".

From the very first episode, in which Angela makes the accidental death of her brother Jason Gioberti (Harry Townes) seem less suspicious to preserve her stake in the Falcon Crest vineyard, she schemes against her nephew Chase Gioberti (Robert Foxworth), who has inherited enough of the vineyard from his father Jason's will to be a threat to Angela's interests. Refusing to accept any loss of control over Falcon Crest or the Tuscany Valley itself, she first attempts to buy Chase out, but must then resort to deceit, coercion, and all manner of underhanded tactics to thwart Chase's rising power.

Angela is a dominating force even at home, grooming her grandson Lance Cumson (Lorenzo Lamas) to eventually take over the business, and seeking to control every aspect of his life in the meantime. She plots for Lance to marry Melissa Agretti (Ana Alicia), the fiery heiress to valuable vineyards Angela covets, but finds only a "formidable foe" in Melissa, who pits Lance and Chase's son, Cole Gioberti (William R. Moses), against each other and repeatedly crosses Angela.

Another threat to Angela rises in Richard, the illegitimate son of Angela's ex-husband Douglas Channing (Stephen Elliott) and Chase's mother Jacqueline Perrault (Lana Turner). Their power struggles and bitter rivalry only intensify when they discover later in the series that they are actually mother and son. It takes a common enemy to finally ease the hostility between them. In the series finale "Home Again", Angela is shown "waxing nostalgic about her years of manipulation and skullduggery to keep the Falcon Crest winery in her control."

== Storylines ==
=== Season one ===
As Falcon Crest debuts, Angela Channing's brother Jason Gioberti is accidentally pushed to his death by Angela's daughter Emma Channing. To ensure she inherits Jason's share of the Falcon Crest winery per the unique conditions of his will, Angela stages Jason's death to look like a drunken car accident. Jason's son Chase Gioberti and his wife Maggie arrive in the Tuscany Valley from New York and claim Jason's house and a portion of the vineyards. Angela schemes with an old friend of Chase's to force out her nephew, but the plan backfires. When Chase is in need of money to hire workers and cover a large outstanding tax bill, Angela offers to buy his pre-harvested grapes at below market value, strong arming a competitor into rescinding his own offer for the grapes. Angela is infuriated by the continuing irresponsible behavior of her grandson Lance Cumson, and courts Chase's son Cole Gioberti as the potential heir to Falcon Crest.

Angela gets assault charges dropped against Lance, and plots to keep Lance's newly returned father Tony Cumson from his ex-wife, Angela's daughter Julia. Emma's ex-lover Turner Bates blackmails Angela with the truth of Jason's death, and when Angela involves the police Turner is killed. Romance is rekindled between Angela and her ex-husband Douglas Channing while she is in Italy with Cole for an important wine-tasting competition, but she rejects his proposal to remarry. Angela plots for Lance to marry heiress Melissa Agretti as a means to eventually obtain the lucrative Agretti Vineyards. After a bitter argument with Angela, Lance falls in love and plans to move to San Francisco, but he cannot resist Angela's offer to drop the girl and return to the fold. Chase confronts Angela with evidence that she may have been involved in crippling a girl forty years before, and she retaliates by playing a portion of a recording that leaves Chase believing that his father hated him.

Chase's mother, Jacqueline Perrault, warns Chase of Angela's treacherous nature and tries to persuade him to leave Falcon Crest. Angela does everything in her power to prevent Chase from being elected to the County Board of Supervisors, but fails. She is furious when Lance begins working at Douglas's newspaper The San Francisco Globe, and schemes to derail Melissa's inconvenient new relationship with Cole to clear the way for Lance. Angela attempts to foil Chase's inquiries about the circumstances of his father's death. Angela pressures Lance to propose to Melissa, who is in love with Cole but agrees to marry Lance.

Angela tries to keep Emma sedated to prevent her from testifying about Jason, fearing that she could lose Falcon Crest if Chase's attorney can prove that Jason died under suspicious circumstances. Emma escapes the mansion and takes the stand, confessing her role in Jason's death. The jury rules that Jason "died at the hands of another", thereby giving Chase control of Falcon Crest. He magnanimously offers 50 percent of the vineyard to Angela, and though she detests the thought of sharing Falcon Crest with anyone, she has no choice and accepts.

=== Season two ===
Angela tries to thwart Chase's claims to Falcon Crest, as well as his attempts to break her stranglehold on county water supplies. Douglas's illegitimate son, Richard Channing, has inherited fifty percent of The San Francisco Globe after his father's death, and Angela seeks to block Richard from taking control of the newspaper as the new chairman of the board. Chase uses evidence of Angela's complicity in a deadly gas explosion to force her into sharing the operation of Falcon Crest with him. Richard vows to destroy Angela.

Melissa's father, Carlo Agretti, confronts Angela about Lance's abuse of Melissa, and tells Angela she will never get his land via the marriage. Angela is determined that Chase not discover that she secretly owns and profits from the company that distributes Falcon Crest's wine. Angela's schemes to overcome Chase's efforts to break her water monopoly fail. Angela plays Lance and Cole against each other, and is andy to find Lance in bed with a woman other than his wife.

Emma disappears, secretly giving Chase the voting proxy to her share of The Globe which Angela hoped would give her control of the newspaper's board of directors. Chase discovers that Angela is using all of Falcon Crest's investment funds to buy up stock in the newspaper. Just as Angela has nearly enough stock to seize control, Richard announces he is issuing two million dollars more of stock, a strategy that Angela and her lawyer Phillip Erikson had not foreseen. Angela plots to delay Richard, but she still needs Chase's votes to take over the newspaper.

=== Season eight ===
In the aftermath of Richard's "death", Angela surprises her family and friends with her resignation over the loss of Falcon Crest to Melissa. She later decides to stay in Tuscany Valley and fight for her family's land; and later launches an attack on Melissa. Angela secretly arranges a meeting between Frank Agretti and his long-estranged son, Nick.

When Angela offers District Attorney Fields her support for the governorship in exchange for dropping the murder charges against Lance, he indignantly refuses; however, when Richard offers to hire Field's leukemic son to join the staff of The New Globe, Fields agrees to the deal. After Nick Agretti is enraptured when he witnesses Pilar swimming nude, Angela informs him that she has learned some information he cannot release, revealing that the price for keeping the secret is Falcon Crest itself.

After Angela blackmails Nick with incriminating information about his past, Nick surrenders Falcon Crest to Angela, who begins plans to rebuild the house. She is later disturbed by the news of Libby Carnes, who offers Frank a job in Colombia mining for emeralds. After Angela is outmaneuvered for the purchase of a bottling company, she is determined to learn who is behind the consortium.

=== Season nine ===
As Angela prepares to leave for Greece, she leaves her grandson Lance in charge, though under the strict supervision of her reliable foreman, Frank Agretti. Angela hires a private investigator to tail Pilar. Although Angela disapproves of Charley and changes her vacation plans, Emma stands by Charley despite Angela's interference. Aware that Angela is trying to break up his relationship with Emma, Charley places a pillow over Angela's face and suffocates her. After being found unconscious, Angela is rushed to the hospital, where she slips into a coma. Lance has a difficult time managing Falcon Crest without Angela, particularly when business associates insist on negotiating with Angela, but fortunately, Pilar is able to help Lance deal with their distributor, Ned Vogel. A power outage at the hospital forces the family to consider pulling the plug on Angela's life support.

Richard's plans to run the winery with Lauren run into a snag when Angela returns after regaining consciousness. When Richard informs Angela that she has no legal claim to the winery, Angela pretends to give in, but she is secretly planning to block Richard's marriage to Lauren with the help of Michael Sharpe.

After her plans of ruining Richard's engagement to Lauren falls through, Angela must find another way to stop it. Richard agrees to sell Falcon Crest back to Angela on the condition that half will go to his sons in the event of her death. Lance, however, will receive ten percent now and the remainder after Angela's death. As the wedding reception draws to a close, Angela recalls all the people who passed through Tuscany Valley during the last decade and toasts the future of Falcon Crest.

== Reception ==
Angela has been called "the matriarch-you-love-to-hate".

Wyman was nominated for a Golden Globe Award for Best Actress in a Television Drama Series in 1983, and won in 1984. She was nominated for five Soap Opera Digest Awards for playing Angela in 1986, 1988, and 1989.
