= List of Falcon Crest characters =

The following is a list of characters from Falcon Crest, an American primetime television soap opera which aired from 1981 to 1990.

== Cast timeline ==
Character	Actor	Seasons								
Character	Actor	1	2	3	4	5	6	7	8	9
Angela Channing	Jane Wyman	Main	Main	Main	Main	Main	Main	Main	Main	Main
Chase Gioberti	Robert Foxworth	Main	Main	Main	Main	Main	Main			
Lance Cumson	Lorenzo Lamas	Main	Main	Main	Main	Main	Main	Main	Main	Main
Cole Gioberti	William R. Moses (Note: Moses is credited as "Billy R. Moses" for the first two seasons.)	Main (Note: Moses departs in "Maggie" (ep. 6.10).)	Main	Main	Main	Main	Main	Guest		
Vickie Gioberti	Jamie Rose	Main	Main	Recurring						
Vickie Gioberti	Dana Sparks						Main (Note: Sparks departs in "Farewell, My Lovelies" (ep. 8.2).)	Main	Main	
Julia Cumson	Abby Dalton	Main (Note: Dalton departs in "Ashes to Ashes" (ep. 3.28). She returns to the opening credits from "Lord of the Valley" (ep. 4.6) to "Forsaking All Others" (ep. 4.20).)	Main	Main	Main	Recurring	Recurring			
Maggie Gioberti	Susan Sullivan	Main	Main	Main	Main	Main	Main	Main	Main	Guest
Richard Channing	David Selby		Main	Main	Main	Main	Main	Main	Main	Main
Melissa Agretti	Ana Alicia (Note: Delores Cantú initially plays the character in "For Love or Money" (ep. 1.11).)	Recurring	Main (Note: Alicia departs in "Dust to Dust" (ep. 8.3). She returns briefly later in the season as Melissa's look-a-like Samantha Ross.)	Main	Main	Main	Main	Main	Main	
Phillip Erikson	Mel Ferrer	Recurring	Recurring	Main						
Emma Channing	Margaret Ladd	Recurring	Recurring	Main (Note: Ladd departs in "There Goes the Bride" (ep. 8.10). She returns to the opening credits from "Decline and Fall" (ep. 8.22) to "Danny" (ep. 9.10).)	Main	Main	Main	Main	Main	Main
Terry Hartford	Laura Johnson			Recurring	Main	Main	Stand-in			
Gustav Riebmann	Paul Freeman				Main (Note: Freeman departs in "Retribution" (ep. 4.19).)					
Pamela Lynch	Sarah Douglas			Recurring	Main (Note: Douglas departs in "Confessions" (ep. 4.29).)	Guest (Note: Martine Beswick takes over the role in "Ingress & Egress" (ep. 5.5).)				
Greg Reardon	Simon MacCorkindale				Main	Main				
Christopher Rossini	Ken Olin					Main (Note: Olin departs in "Shattered Dreams" (ep. 5.17).)				
Eric Stavros	John Callahan					Recurring	Main	Main		
Peter Stavros	Cesar Romero					Recurring	Main		Guest	
Dan Fixx	Brett Cullen						Main (Note: Cullen is initially recurring before being added to the opening credits from "Hot Spots" (ep. 6.11).)	Main		
Chao-Li Chi	Chao-Li Chi	Recurring	Recurring	Recurring	Recurring	Recurring	Recurring	Main (Note: Chi departs in "Four Women" (ep. 9.13). He returns to the opening credits from "The Return" (ep. 9.20) to "Home Again" (ep. 9.22).)	Main	Main
Pilar Ortega	Kristian Alfonso								Main	Main
Nick Agretti	David Beecroft								Main (Note: Beecroft is added to the opening credits from "Dust to Dust" (ep. 8.3).)	
Frank Agretti	Rod Taylor							Recurring	Recurring	Main (Note: Taylor departs in "Madness Descending" (ep. 9.12).)
Michael Sharpe	Gregory Harrison									Main
Lauren Daniels	Wendy Phillips									Main (Note: Phillips is added to the opening credits from "Flesh & Blood" (ep. 9.3).)
Genele Ericson	Andrea Thompson									Main (Note: Thompson is initially recurring before being added to the opening credits from "Time Bomb" (ep. 9.11).)

== Main characters ==
Angela Channing (née Gioberti), later Erikson, Stavros, Agretti – Jane Wyman (1981–90; 208 episodes)
Angela is the tough, tyrannical matriarch of Falcon Crest and a powerful woman in Tuscany Valley, and the principal character of the series. She has two daughters, Julia and Emma, from her first marriage to newspaper owner Douglas Channing, and goes on to marry three more times. Determined to preserve and expand Falcon Crest for her heirs, she ruthlessly combats any challengers, with her nephew Chase and Douglas's illegitimate son Richard proving the most formidable of her opponents. Richard is later revealed to be her long-lost son. During the course of the series, Angela marries her devious lawyer Phillip Erikson, becoming a widow a short time later when he dies in a plane crash. She later marries her old flame, billionaire Peter Stavros, and life-long friend Frank Agretti. Towards the end of the series, Angela is almost killed by Charley St. James, who tries to smother her with a pillow. She is left in a coma for several months before making a full recovery and returning home. Jane Wyman appeared in almost every episode of the series, for eight seasons, plus the first two and last three episodes of the ninth season, for a total of 208 of the 227 episodes of the series, missing 19 episodes (mostly in the final season) due to health problems.
Chase Gioberti – Robert Foxworth (1981–1987; 155 episodes)
A former commercial airline pilot and Vietnam veteran, Chase moves back to the Tuscany Valley from New York after the death of his father Jason. Having inherited some land from his father, Chase is determined to make a go of running the winery which in turn brings him into conflict with his aunt Angela. The mysterious nature of his father's death eventually makes him half-owner of Falcon Crest, much to Angela's dismay. Throughout the course of the series, Chase is shot twice, has affairs with Connie Giannini and Gabrielle Short, and is later presumed drowned in the waters of the San Francisco Bay while attempting to rescue Melissa and Dan Fixx. His body is never recovered.
Lance Cumson – Lorenzo Lamas (1981–90; 227 episodes)
Lance is Julia's son, who Angela grooms as her eventual heir. A handsome ladies' man, he enjoys a playboy lifestyle but is often dragged in Angela's schemes. He is also proficient in martial arts, under the mentorship of Chao-Li. During the series, his grandmother forces him to marry Melissa Agretti so she can acquire the adjoining Agretti lands. After Melissa loses their baby and they divorce, Lance marries Richard's stepdaughter Lorraine, who later dies while pregnant with his child. After liaisons with Terry Hartford, singer Apollonia, Dina Wells and Shannon Taylor, a second marriage with Melissa and the death of his unborn child with Diane "Cookie" Nash, Lance eventually marries Pilar Ortega, the mother of his secret daughter Lisa. Lorenzo Lamas is the only actor to appear in all 227 episodes of the series.
Cole Hartford Gioberti – William R. Moses (1981–1986, 1987; 140 episodes)
Chase and Maggie's son. He supports his father in his new venture running the vineyards, foregoing his dreams of becoming an archaeologist like his grandfather. During the series, he falls in love with Melissa Agretti, and fathers her son Joseph, before marrying Linda Caproni, the baker's daughter. After Linda dies in a plane crash, Cole and Melissa rekindle their relationship and get married. They eventually divorce after Cole fathers a daughter with her cousin, Robin Agretti, who later leaves town with their child, Hope Margaret. In season six, Cole leaves Tuscany Valley to become a partner in a new wine venture in Sydney, Australia, and Joseph is later sent to live with him following Melissa's mental breakdown. They are visited by Melissa and Dan Fixx in season seven, where it is revealed that Cole had married a woman named Kathleen (Deborra-Lee Furness) and was raising Joseph and Kathleen's daughter (from her first marriage) on a sheep farm in the Australian outback.
Victoria "Vickie" Gioberti, later Hogan, Stavros – Jamie Rose (1981–1983; 44 episodes), Dana Sparks (1986–1988; 58 episodes)
Chase and Maggie's daughter. She is an aspiring dancer who struggles with her family's move from New York to Tuscany Valley, and has particular trouble with the men in her life. During the first two seasons, she dates Mario Nuñez, the vineyardist's son, and county supervisor Nick Hogan, who she eventually marries. When Vickie discovers Nick is still involved with his ex-wife and using her for money, she divorces him and moves back to New York. She returns three years later, now played by Dana Sparks, after touring Europe as a ballet dancer, and ending a second marriage to an American soldier stationed in Germany. She dates Dan Fixx, before marrying Angela's stepson Eric Stavros, who is plagued by a gambling addiction and prone to violent outbursts. She leaves the valley for Paris when his father Peter begs her for help after Eric has a nervous breakdown and is institutionalized.
Julia Cumson (née Channing) – Abby Dalton (1981–1986; 98 episodes)
Angela's eldest daughter, and the chief enologist at the winery. She is the mother of Lance, with ex-husband Tony Cumson, and Christopher, her illegitimate son with vintner Dominic Rossini, who she was told was stillborn. She is continually oppressed by her domineering mother, who succeeded in driving her husband away over a decade ago and exacerbated her drinking problem. During the course of the series, she becomes increasingly unstable, and is eventually revealed as the killer of Carlo Agretti, her lover who she murdered to protect Falcon Crest from falling into his hands. When confronted about the murder at a family gathering, she pulls out a gun and shoots Chase, killing his mother Jacqueline Perrault in the ensuing struggle. Initially sentenced to life in prison without the possibility of parole, she is deemed unfit and institutionalised in a psychiatric hospital before escaping and going on the run. She plans on killing her mother at her wedding to Phillip, but can't work up the courage, and is later presumed dead after getting trapped in a cabin fire during a confrontation with the police. She emerges alive a few months later, and is sent to a convent in Oregon. Later she is given a retrial and released, returning briefly to the valley before the earthquake hits, where she is injured and suffers from hysterical blindness. She returns to the convent, never seen at Falcon Crest again, although she is mentioned in passing and a pregnant Emma leaves to visit her in a convent in Italy near the end of the series.
Maggie Gioberti (née Hartford), later Channing – Susan Sullivan (1981–1989; 207 episodes)
Chase's wife and the mother of Cole and Vickie. A freelance writer and journalist from New York, she supports her husband's efforts to build a new life in Tuscany Valley. A warm-hearted but resilient woman, Maggie becomes the sympathetic heroine of the series. During the course of the series, she discovers she is adopted, writes a book based on her life in the valley, and is kidnapped and raped by her press agent Jeff Wainwright. Maggie gives birth to a son, Kevin, initially believing Jeff is the father, however it is eventually revealed to be Chase's. After Chase's death, Maggie falls in love and marries Richard and adopts his son, Michael, and Richard adopts her son Kevin. However their marriage does not run smoothly, and she develops a drinking problem. After appearing in every episode for eight seasons, the character is killed off in the first two episodes of season nine, with Maggie getting her diamond ring caught in the swimming pool drain and drowning.
Phillip Erikson – Mel Ferrer (1981–1984; 55 episodes)
Angela's unscrupulous lawyer. Phillip made a career out of advancing Angela's reputation and control of the Tuscany Valley, however he wants more. Angela initially rejects his advances, and becomes jealous when he starts dating Amanda Croft (Anne Jeffreys). He eventually becomes Angela's second husband, but dies only a short time later in a plane crash that also kills Dr. Michael Ranson and Linda Gioberti.
Emma Channing, later Cabot, St. James – Margaret Ladd (1981–1989; 193 episodes)
Angela's younger daughter. She and her lover Turner Bates played a central role in her uncle Jason's accidental death and she has been emotionally fragile ever since. Despite this, Emma is good-hearted and kind-natured, though she eventually learns to resist Angela's constant attempts to control her. Much unlucky in love, her relationships with men always end in heartache or tragedy. During the course of the series, Turner dies in a car accident and she loses his baby, she develops an unrequited crush on Dr. Michael Ranson, and is seduced by Gustav Riebmann and Damon Ross in their schemes against her mother. She eventually finds love with trucker Dwayne Cooley before he dies tragically in the earthquake. She then marries Vince Karlotti, who is revealed to be a conman and polygamist, novelist Daniel Cabot, also known by the pseudonym R.D. Young, and Charley St. James. Emma finally leaves the valley after falling pregnant, and later gives birth to a daughter, Angela, named after her mother.
Chao-Li – Chao-Li Chi (1981–90; 213 episodes)
Angela's faithful Chinese majordomo and chauffeur.
Melissa Agretti, later Cumson, Gioberti – Delores Cantu (1982; 1 episode), Ana Alicia (1982–1988; 178 episodes)
A feisty, selfish young heiress who inherits her father's land, the Agretti Vineyards, and agrees to a marriage of convenience with Lance in order to gain control of Falcon Crest. Melissa is the mother of Joseph, following an affair with Cole Gioberti, whom she later marries. Ana Alicia joined the cast later in the first season (replacing Delores Cantu, who played the part for one episode only) and left early in the eighth season when Melissa died in a fire. However, the actress returned for several episodes later in the season to play a Melissa lookalike, Samantha Ross.
Richard Channing – David Selby (1982–1990; 209 episodes)
A ruthless businessman, Richard first appears as the (ostensibly illegitimate) outcast son of Angela's husband Douglas, having inherited half of his father's newspaper, the San Francisco Globe. Richard proves to be a formidable adversary of both Angela and Chase, and later even manages to gain a one-third ownership of Falcon Crest. Bent on revenge for being outcast as a child, it is later discovered that Richard is actually Angela's son who was reported to have died as a newborn infant by doctors. He is also the father of Michael Channing, following his relationship with businesswoman Cassandra Wilder. He is blackmailed into marrying Maggie's sister Terry Hartford, and later marries Maggie herself. Following her death, he marries Maggie's second cousin, Lauren Daniels. After he joined the series in 1982, actor David Selby appeared in all the episodes until the series concluded in 1990.
Pamela Lynch – Sarah Douglas (1983–1985; 51 episodes), Martine Beswick (1985; 1 episode)
Personal assistant and brief love interest to Richard Channing, and a former employee of a deadly mafia-type organization, The Cartel. Capable of being ruthless and scheming, she also has a softer side, and is especially fond of Richard's stepdaughter, Lorraine Prescott. After finding out that Richard had been recording every conversation in his office, including hers, Pamela betrays him by giving Maggie taped evidence that clears Lance of trying to kill Angela. She also gains control of a winery needed by Angela, Richard, and Chase, and earns a $10 million profit by selling it them at a higher price. In revenge, Richard turns Pamela's file over to Interpol; she then tries to kill him by blowing up his house, injuring him and Maggie. In order to evade capture, she has plastic surgery to alter her appearance.
Terry Hartford, later McCarthy, Ranson, Channing – Laura Johnson (1983–1986; 80 episodes)
Maggie Gioberti's younger sister. Beautiful but devious, she is a former call girl who creates scandal in Tuscany Valley with her attempts to move up the society ladder. After marrying Chase's cousin Michael Ranson, she inherits his wealth following his death in the plane crash at the end of season three, and later blackmails Richard Channing into marrying her. She was killed a short time later in an earthquake that struck the valley. Before marrying Michael Ranson, she was married to race car driver and drug addict Joel McCarthy. The marriage never ended in divorce, but Joel died while trying to get clean at Camp Mary Jane.
Gustav Riebmann – Paul Freeman (1984; 19 episodes)
The son of a Nazi war criminal, he becomes the head of the sinister Cartel after assassinating his own father. He moves to Tuscany Valley in an attempt to gain control of Falcon Crest, knowing that there was a priceless art treasure buried under the estate decades earlier. Gustav, along with his assistant Renee, perish during a cave-in while trying to retrieve the artwork.
Greg Reardon – Simon MacCorkindale (1984–1986; 59 episodes)
A sharp British lawyer who works for Angela, though he rarely approves of her methods. He first pursues Melissa Agretti, then later becomes involved with Terry Hartford. After he discovers she was working for Richard Channing, he later becomes involved with fellow lawyer Jordan Roberts, with whom he eventually leaves the Tuscany Valley.
Father Christopher Rossini – Ken Olin (1985–1986; 17 episodes)
Priest and illegitimate son of Julia Cumson and the late Dominic Rossini. Julia became pregnant with Christopher when she was only a teenager, at which point his wife murdered him by arson. . After he was born, Angela told Julia that the baby had died and allowed him to be raised in a Catholic orphanage in Marysville, Connecticut. When Dominic's wife Anna and daughter Cassandra returned to the Tuscany Valley years later to wreak revenge for what Angela did to their family, Angela was forced to tell Christopher he was her grandson.
Peter Stavros – Cesar Romero (1985–1987, 1988; 51 episodes)
Billionaire Greek shipping tycoon and an old flame of Angela's who helps her win Falcon Crest back from the Rossini family. He eventually becomes Angela's third husband.
Eric Stavros – John Callahan (1986–1988; 66 episodes)
Peter Stavros's playboy son, who first romances Melissa but later marries Vickie Gioberti. He is brainwashed by The Thirteen to kill Richard Channing and is later institutionalized.
Dan Fixx – Brett Cullen (1986–1988; 53 episodes)
Son of Tucker Fixx and his first wife Elizabeth Bradbury, old acquaintances of Angela's, becoming her ward and friend.
Frank Agretti – Rod Taylor (1988–1990; 31 episodes)
Uncle to Melissa, Robin and Chris Agretti and father of Nick. He is a friend of Angela's and becomes her fourth husband out of convenience - to help her leave a psychiatric ward so she can live under his conservatorship.
Pilar Ortega, later Cumson – Kristian Alfonso (1988–1990; 44 episodes)
Former teenage sweetheart of Lance Cumson and eventually his wife. Her father, Cesar, is the Falcon Crest Winery foreman.
Nick Agretti – David Beecroft (1988–1989; 20 episodes)
Frank Agretti's son with his ex-wife Claire and cousin of Melissa, who becomes the executor of her estate after her death, in order to manage it for until her son Joseph's 21st birthday. Nick's teenage son, Ben, is a product of his past relationship with Italian heiress Anna Cellini, though Anna's tyrannical father never approved of Nick and wants to claim Ben as his grandson. Angela uses Ben to blackmail Nick into signing Falcon Crest back over to her.
Michael Sharpe – Gregory Harrison (1989–1990; 22 episodes)
Maggie's second cousin, brother of Lauren, and a ruthless businessman who becomes an opponent of Richard Channing in a battle for control of Falcon Crest.
Lauren Daniels (née Sharpe), later Channing – Wendy Phillips (1989–1990; 20 episodes)
Maggie's second cousin and love interest for her widower, Richard Channing. She later becomes his wife.
Genele Ericson – Andrea Thompson (1989–1990; 19 episodes)
Frank Agretti's murderous sister-in-law.

== Supporting characters ==
=== Introduced in season one ===
- Gus Nuñez – Nick Ramus (1981–1982; 13 episodes)
  Hispanic vineyardist at the Gioberti estate who befriends Chase. He lives on the property with his wife Alicia (Silvana Gallardo) and son Mario. He later dies after accidentally digging into a gas line while repairing an irrigation pipe.
- Mario Nuñez – Mario Marcelino ((1981–1982; 12 episodes)
  Gus's son, who becomes romantically involved with Vickie Gioberti. He leaves town with his mother following his father's death.
- Douglas Channing – Stephen Elliott (1981–1982; 9 episodes)
  Angela's estranged first husband and father of Julia, Emma and Richard. He is owner of The San Francisco Globe newspaper, and following his death he bequeaths half of his shares to his illegitimate son Richard.
- Tony Cumson – John Saxon (1982, 1986–1988; 32 episodes), Robert Loggia (1982; 1 episode)
  Julia's husband and Lance's father who was driven away by Angela. He makes brief returns to try and bond with Lance.
- Jacqueline Perrault – Lana Turner (1982–1983; 6 episodes)
  Chase's flamboyant mother and bitter enemy of Angela. She was co-founder of the Cartel. Years earlier, Jacqueline had an affair with Angela's first husband Douglas and later told Richard that she was his mother, though it later emerged that this was not true. When Julia Cumson was revealed to be Carlo Agretti's murderer in front of the entire family, Julia pulled out a gun. A struggle ensued and shots were fired, one of which killed Jacqueline.
- Carlo Agretti – Carlos Romero (1982; 9 episodes)
  Melissa's wealthy father and owner of the Agretti vineyards. He is murdered by Julia Cumson after he tries to use their affair to gain control of Falcon Crest.
- Father Bob – Bob Curtis (1982–1990; 39 episodes)
  A Catholic priest who is a longtime friend and confidant of Angela.

=== Introduced in season two ===
- Diana Hunter – Shannon Tweed (1982–1983; 21 episodes)
  Personal assistant to Richard Channing who is working for the sinister Cartel organization.
- Nick Hogan – Roy Thinnes (1982–1983; 20 episodes)
  County supervisor and Vickie Gioberti's first husband, who married her for her family's fortune. He was later exposed to still be involved with his wife Sheila (Katherine Justice) and Vickie ended the marriage.
- Darryl Clayton – Bradford Dillman (1982–1983; 10 episodes)
  Film producer who works with Maggie Gioberti on a screenplay she is writing, but is actually part of a plot by Angela to destroy her marriage to Chase.
- Katherine Demery – Joanna Cassidy (1982; 5 episodes)
  The owner of a small vineyard who has a brief romantic involvement with much younger Cole Gioberti before leaving the valley.
- Amanda Croft – Anne Jeffreys (1982-1983; 6 episodes)
  The wife of a prominent politician and Phillip Erikson's love interest. Her relationship with Phillip ends after Angela's interference.
- Vince Caproni – Harry Basch (1983–1984; 11 episodes)
  Linda's father, who disapproves of her marriage to Cole Gioberti. Following his daughter's death, he leaves the valley to live with relatives.
- Linda Caproni Gioberti – Mary Kate McGeehan (1983–1984; 34 episodes)
  Cole Gioberti's first wife, who dies in a plane crash.
- Joseph Gioberti – Jason Goldberg (1983–1987; 67 episodes)
  The son of Cole Gioberti and Melissa Agretti. Although Melissa was already pregnant with Joseph by the time she married Lance, it emerged that Cole was his father and a bitter custody battle ensued. Angela later convinced Melissa to give Joseph to Cole in return for Chase returning her half of Falcon Crest after a legal dispute. Melissa agreed on the condition that she was to become Angela's sole heir. Years later, when Melissa became increasingly unstable, Joseph eventually went to live with Cole in Australia.

=== Introduced in season three ===
- Dr. Michael Ranson – Cliff Robertson (1983–1984; 28 episodes)
  Jacqueline's nephew and Chase's cousin, who starts working as a neurosurgeon at the Tuscany Valley hospital. He later marries Terry Hartford, but is killed in the plane crash that also killed Phillip Erikson and Linda Gioberti.

=== Introduced in season four ===
- Joel McCarthy – Parker Stevenson (1984–1985; 12 episodes)
  Terry Hartford's unscrupulous ex-husband and a drug addict. He comes to the Tuscany Valley to blackmail Terry as their divorce was never finalized, meaning her marriage to Michael Ranson was never legal. He is paid by Melissa to frame Lance for the attempted murder of Angela.
- Lorraine Prescott, later Cumson – Kate Vernon (1984–1985; 25 episodes)
  Stepdaughter of Richard Channing and love interest for Lance. Though neither Angela nor Richard approve of their relationship, Lorraine marries Lance after she becomes pregnant with his child, but she and her unborn baby later die after a fall.
- Charlotte Pershing – Jane Greer (1984–1985; 6 episodes)
  Maggie's biological mother who gave her up for adoption at birth. She has a gambling addiction that Angela uses to her advantage.
- Damon Ross (Rossini) – Jonathan Frakes (1985; 11 episodes)
  Brother of Cassandra Wilder, and son of Anna and Dominic Rossini. Damon works for his sister at Wilder Advertising, a top San Francisco ad agency, from where they both plot to take over Falcon Crest and ruin Angela for her alleged crimes against their family. He briefly romances Emma, which deters him from taking part in the final takeover.
- Connie Giannini – Carla Borelli (1985; 12 episodes)
  The beautiful owner of the Giannini Vineyards, she begins working with Chase, whom she is attracted to and has a brief fling with.
- Robin Agretti – Barbara Howard (1985–1986; 27 episodes)
  Melissa's cousin, the daughter of Phillip and Theresa Agretti. Robin comes to visit Melissa and later agrees to help her and Cole by being a surrogate mother, as Melissa cannot have any more children. However, she becomes attracted to Cole and undermines his marriage to Melissa at every opportunity. When she eventually gives birth to a baby girl, Hope, she leaves the valley with the child, determined that Melissa will never raise her. Robin's father Phillip dies sometime before Frank Agretti returns to Tuscany Valley.
- Francesca Gioberti – Gina Lollobrigida (1984; 5 episodes)
  Angela's Italian half-sister, who visits Tuscany Valley with a claim to a share of Falcon Crest that she later sells to Richard.
- Paul Hartford - Andrew Duggan (1984–1985; 4 episodes)
  Maggie's and Terry's archeologist father. Paul adopted Maggie with his late wife Margaret.
- Cassandra Wilder – Anne Archer (1984–1985; 22 episodes)
  A cool, calculating businesswoman who becomes involved with Richard. She later manages to gain controlling interest in Falcon Crest, which she plans to destroy because of Angela's crimes against her family. Daughter of Anna Rossini, sister of Damon Ross and half-sister of Father Christopher Rossini. Cassandra becomes pregnant with Richard's child, Michael, but dies in childbirth.
- Anna Rossini – Celeste Holm (1985; 6 episodes)
  A bitter widow with an old score to settle with Angela. Mother of Cassandra Wilder and Damon Ross. She was institutionalized after trying to kill Angela by setting Falcon Crest on fire, as part of her revenge against Angela for supposedly driving her husband to suicide. Aware of but in denial over the affair her husband had with Julia Cumson, which led to the birth of Christopher Rossini.

=== Introduced in season five ===
- Jordan Roberts – Morgan Fairchild (1985–1986; 29 episodes)
  A glamorous attorney who works for Richard Channing and helps him rebuild his empire after he loses his share of Falcon Crest and goes bankrupt. Although a sharp, intelligent woman, Jordan suffers from multiple personality disorder following years of abuse at the hands of her father, who molested her as a child. She later becomes involved with Greg Reardon and, after receiving treatment for her condition, the two of them leave the Tuscany Valley together.
- Apollonia – Apollonia Kotero (1985–1986; 10 episodes)
  A singer who becomes romantically involved with Lance. When her career takes off, she leaves San Francisco.
- Dwayne Cooley – Daniel Greene (1985–1986; 23 episodes)
  A dashing truck driver who falls for Emma Channing. He later goes into the wine distribution business with Chase. Dwayne and Emma intend to marry, much against Angela's wishes, but he is killed in the earthquake that devastated the valley in 1986.
- Jeff Wainwright – Edward Albert (1986–1987; 18 episodes)
  A press agent for a book written by Maggie Gioberti, but his interest in her takes a disturbing turn when he begins stalking Maggie, later kidnapping and raping her.
- Li-Ying – Rosalind Chao (1986; 4 episodes)
  Chao-Li's daughter, who comes to Tuscany Valley to visit her father. Li-Ying works as a seismologist and predicted the deadly earthquake that occurred in Tuscany Valley.
- Erin Jones – Jill Jacobson (1985–1987; 21 episodes)
  An unscrupulous woman who performs underhanded work for Angela, such as infecting Chase's vineyards with a parasite. She later works for Richard Channing and tries to double-cross him, but her plan backfires. Also responsible for shooting Chase Gioberti.

=== Introduced in season six ===
- Kit Marlowe – Kim Novak (1986–1987; 19 episodes)
  A woman with a shady past who poses as Peter Stavros's dead stepdaughter. She causes mayhem when she arrives in Tuscany Valley and is pursued by deadly gangster Roland Saunders. Kit eventually becomes involved with Lance's father Tony, and the two of them leave to go and live on Peter's private island, only to later part ways.
- Roland Saunders – Robert Stack (1987; 5 episodes)
  Mafioso-type criminal who is out to kill Kit Marlowe. He is himself later killed by Peter Stavros.
- Meredith Braxton – Jane Badler (1986–1987; 22 episodes)
  Erin Jones's sister, and later assistant to Richard Channing after her sister's death. After he spurns her, she turns on Richard and provides Angela with information that will ruin him.
- Garth – Carl Held (1986–1989; 46 episodes)
  Personal assistant and head of security for Richard Channing.
- Guy Stafford – Jeff Kober (1986–1987; 6 episodes)
  Hired killer sent to kill Kit Marlowe.
- Vince Karlotti – Marjoe Gortner (1986–1987; 17 episodes)
  A charlatan posing as a psychic medium who has Emma Channing under his spell. When he marries her, it is revealed that he is a polygamist.
- Dina Wells – Robin Greer (1986–1987; 22 episodes)
  Love interest for Lance who is crippled after a racing car accident and is killed by a psychotic nurse. Greer and Lamas were also briefly engaged in real life, but split up in 1987. Their onscreen relationship followed suit.
- Gabrielle Short – Cindy Morgan (1987–1988; 15 episodes)
  Love interest for Chase following the end of his marriage to Maggie.
- Francine Hope – Melba Moore (1987; 4 episodes)
  An adoption attorney who tries to help Maggie Gioberti trace her baby.

=== Introduced in season seven ===
- John Remick – Ed Marinaro (1987; 5 episodes)
  Vietnam veteran and an old friend of Chase's, who visits Maggie following Chase's death.
- Carly Fixx – Mariska Hargitay (1987–1988; 15 episodes)
  Dan Fixx's alleged half-sister who has romantic feelings for him. When they discover they are not actually related, they become involved and leave the Tuscany Valley. During her stay, Carly becomes a close friend of Angela's.
- Nicole Sauguet – Leslie Caron (1987; 3 episodes)
  Wealthy French woman and old friend of Chase's who arrives in the valley following his death, claiming she loaned him $30,000,000.
- Liz McDowell – Lauren Hutton (1987; 4 episodes)
  A businesswoman who has dealings with Richard Channing and later develops feelings for him.
- Carlton Travis – Eddie Albert (1987; 3 episodes)
  A villain whose dealings with Angela and Richard turn deadly.
- Lillian Nash Darlington – Eve Arden (1987; 1 episode)
  A Washington society hostess and wife of a Supreme Court judge, whom Angela asks for help with in dealing with Carlton Travis.
- Rosemont - Roscoe Lee Browne (1988; 10 episodes)
  The apparent leader of The Thirteen, a group of corrupt businessmen with whom Richard Channing gets entangled with. He and The Thirteen are later eliminated by John Remick on the orders of his brother, U.S. Senator Peter Ryder.
- Madame Malec – Ursula Andress (1988; 3 episodes)
  An exotic woman whom Richard Channing deals in his efforts to rescue Vickie Gioberti from a white slave ring. She is later found murdered in Richard's bed.

=== Introduced in season eight ===
- Tommy Ortega – Dan Ferro (1988–1989; 18 episodes)
  Pilar Ortega's brother, who goes to work at the Tuscany Herald newspaper and becomes attracted to Maggie. Tommy leaves town with his father and his brother to live near his aunt.
- César Ortega – Castulo Guerra (1988–1989; 13 episodes)
  Pilar Ortega's father who works as the foreman at Falcon Crest. Cesar left the valley with his two sons to live near his sister Mercedes.
- Gabriel Ortega – Danny Nucci (1988–1989; 16 episodes)
  Pilar Ortega's younger brother who befriends Ben Agretti.
- Ben Agretti – Brandon Douglas (1988–1989; 17 episodes)
  Son of Nick Agretti and Anna Cellini.
- Anna Cellini – Assumpta Serna (1988–1989; 8 episodes)
  An old flame of Nick Agretti's and mother of his son, Ben. Her relationship with Nick was thwarted by her powerful, tyrannical father. Anna comes to the Tuscany Valley to re-establish contact with Nick and Ben when she discovers she is terminally ill.

=== Introduced in season nine ===
- Charley St. James – Mark Lindsay Chapman (1989–1990; 8 episodes)
  Sleazy villain who manipulates his way into Emma's affections and tries to kill Angela.
- Walker Daniels – Robert Ginty (1989–1990; 7 episodes)
  Lauren Daniels's unstable husband.
- Sydney St. James – Carla Gugino (1989–1990; 11 episodes)
  Young wife of Ian St. James, who has an affair with Chris Agretti.
- Chris Agretti - Chris Young (1989; 4 episodes)
  Nephew to Frank (son of a late unnamed Agretti brother), who ends up becoming involved with Sydney before being killed by her husband Ian St. James
- Ian St. James – David Hunt (1989–1990; 4 episodes)
  Charley St. James's brother, who is responsible for the deaths of Emma's husband Daniel Cabot (a.k.a. R.D. Young) and Frank's nephew Chris Agretti.
- Danny Sharpe – David Sheinkopf (1989–1990; 12 episodes)
  Headstrong young man who believes that Michael Sharpe is his father, but later learns from his mother Anne Bowen that it is Richard Channing.

== Gioberti family tree ==
Italics indicate offscreen character, never seen on show but mentioned.

- Giuseppe “Joseph” Gioberti † (1855–1919), married Tessa Lindström
  - Jasper Robert Gioberti † (1883–1959), son of Joseph and Tessa, married Lily Travers
    - Angela Gioberti (1914–), daughter of Jasper and Lily, married Douglas Channing (1941–50s), Phillip Erikson (1984), Peter Stavros (Note: Stavros family branch: Peter Stavros (1912–), married Angela Gioberti and 3 other women; Sofia Stavros (1950–), daughter of Peter and his first wife, married Philippe Hubert (1985–86); Skylar Kimball † (1942–86), stepdaughter of Peter from his second marriage; Eric Stavros (1956–), son of Peter and his third wife, married Vickie Gioberti (1987–))(1986–87), Frank Agretti (Note: Agretti family branch: Franco Agretti † (1870–1905); Frank and Carlo's parents; Frank Agretti (1929–), married Claire (1955–70s), Renee Ericson (1980), Angela Gioberti (1989–); Nick Agretti (1955–), son of Frank and Claire; Ben Agretti (1972–), son of Nick and Anna Cellini; Carlo Agretti † (1931–82); Melissa Agretti † (1960–88), daughter of Carlo, married Lance Cumson (1982–84, 86–87), Cole Gioberti (1984–86); Joseph Gioberti (1982–), son of Melissa and Cole; Augustino Agretti † (1933–47); Philip Agretti, married Theresa; Robin Agretti (1964–), daughter of Philip and Theresa; Hope Margaret Agretti (1985–), daughter of Robin and Cole Gioberti; Chris's father; Chris Agretti † (1970–89), son of unnamed Agretti brother) (1989–)
      - Richard Channing (1942–), son of Angela and Douglas, married Stephanie Hoffman (1968–78), Terry Hartford (Note: Hartford family branch: Paul Charles Hartford (1916–), married Margaret Griffith (1940s–77); Margaret "Maggie" Hartford † (1941–89), daughter of Charlotte Pershing and Oliver Donovan, adopted by Paul and Margaret, married Chase Gioberti (1959–87), Richard Channing (1988–89); Cole Hartford Gioberti (1962–), son of Chase and Maggie, married Linda Caproni (1983–84), Melissa Agretti (1984–86), Kathleen (1987–); Joseph Gioberti (1982–), son of Cole and Melissa; Hope Margaret Agretti (1985–), daughter of Cole and Robin Agretti; Victoria "Vickie" Gioberti (1964–), daughter of Chase and Maggie, married Nick Hogan (1983), soldier (1985–86), Eric Stavros (1987–); Kevin Channing (1987–), son of Chase and Maggie, adopted by Richard; Terry Hartford † (1947–86), daughter of Paul and Margaret, married Joel Eric McCarthy (1974–85), Dr. Michael Ranson (1984), Richard Channing (1985–86)) (1985–86), Maggie Hartford (1988–89), Lauren Sharpe (Note: Sharpe family branch: Michael and Lauren's parents; Michael Sharpe (1950–), married Anne Bowen (1969–73), Savanna (1987–89) and 2 other women; Danny Sharpe (1970–), son of Anne and Richard Channing, adopted by Michael; Lauren Sharpe, married Walker Daniels (1982–90), Richard Channing (1990–); Steven Daniels †, son of Lauren and Walker; John Daniels †, son of Lauren and Walker) (1990–)
        - Lorraine Prescott † (1965–85), daughter of Stephanie and her first husband
        - Danny Sharpe (1970–), son of Richard and Anne Bowen
        - Michael Channing (1986–), son of Richard and Cassandra Wilder, adopted by Maggie Channing (Note: Rossini family branch: Dominic Rossini † (?–1959), married Anna (1948–59); Cassandra Wilder † (1948–86), daughter of Dominic and Anna; Michael Channing (1986–), son of Cassandra and Richard Channing; Damon Rossini (1951–), son of Dominic and Anna; Christopher Rossini (1959–), son of Dominic and Julia Channing)
        - Kevin Channing (1987–), son of Maggie and Chase, adopted by Richard
      - Julia Channing (1943–), daughter of Angela and Douglas, married Anthony "Tony" Cumson (1960–83)
        - Christopher Rossini (1959–), son of Julia and Dominic Rossini
        - Lance Cumson (1960–), son of Julia and Tony, married Melissa Agretti (1982–84, 86–87), Lorraine Prescott (1985), Pilar Ortega (Note: Ortega family branch: César and Mercédes's parents; César Ortega, married Elena (1963–77); Pilar Ortega (1963–), daughter of César and Elena, married Lance Cumson (1989–); Lisa Vargas (1980–), daughter of Pilar and Lance, adopted by Mercédes and Steve; Tomás "Tommy" Ortega (1969–), son of César and Elena, married Kelly Hallinan (1989–); Gabriel Ortega (1972–), son of César and Elena; Mercédes Ortega, married Steve Vargas) (1989–)
          - Lisa Ortega (1980–), daughter of Lance and Pilar, adopted by Mercédes and Steve Vargas
      - Emma Channing (1947–), daughter of Angela and Douglas, married Vince Karlotti (1987), Daniel Cabot (1989), Charley St. James (1989)
        - Angela St. James (1990–), daughter of Emma and Charley
    - Jason Gioberti † (1920–81), son of Jasper and Lily, married Jacqueline Perrault (1939–51)
      - Chase Gioberti † (1939–87), son of Jason and Jacqueline, married Maggie Hartford (1959–87)
        - Cole Hartford Gioberti (1962–), son of Chase and Maggie, married Linda Caproni (1983–84), Melissa Agretti (1984–86), Kathleen (1986–)
          - Joseph Gioberti (1982–), son of Cole and Melissa
          - Hope Margaret Agretti (1985–), daughter of Cole and Robin Agretti
        - Victoria "Vickie" Gioberti (1964–), daughter of Chase and Maggie, married Nick Hogan (1983), soldier (1985–86), Eric Stavros (1987–)
        - Kevin Channing (1987–), son of Chase and Maggie, adopted by Richard
    - Francesca Anna-Maria Gioberti (1927–), daughter of Jasper and his Italian lover
  - Vesta Gioberti † (1800s–1907)
  - Paolo Gioberti † (1884–1900s)

Family branches
