= The Haunting of Seacliff Inn =

- Genre: Drama; Horror; Mystery
- Written by: Walter Klenhard; Tom Walla
- Directed by: Walter Klenhard
- Starring: Ally Sheedy; William R. Moses; Lucinda Weist; Tom McCleister; Maxine Stuart
- Music by: Shirley Walker
- Country of origin: United States
- Original language: English

Production
- Executive producer: Michael Scott
- Producer: Timothy Marx
- Production locations: Mendocino, California; Camarillo, California
- Cinematography: Rohn Schmidt
- Editor: M. Scott Smith
- Running time: 94 minutes
- Production companies: Timothy Marx Productions; MCA Television Entertainment

Original release
- Network: USA Network
- Release: September 22, 1994

The Haunting of Seacliff Inn is a 1994 American made-for-television mystery film starring Ally Sheedy and William R. Moses. It was written by Walter Klenhard and Tom Walla and directed by Klenhard. The film originally aired on USA Network on September 22, 1994.

== Plot ==
A couple starts to live in strange and scary situations when they move to an old house in a seaside town.

== Cast ==
- Ally Sheedy as Susan Enright
- William R. Moses as Mark Enright
- Lucinda Weist as Sara Warner
- Tom McCleister as John
- Maxine Stuart as Lorraine Adler
- Shannon Cochran as Sheriff Tomizack
- Louise Fletcher as Dorothy O'Hara
- Jay W. MacIntosh as Caroline
- James Horan as Jeremiah Hastings

== Reception ==
TV Guide gave it two out of four stars, stating: "Although not terribly scary, THE HAUNTING OF SEACLIFF INN unfolds in an effectively moody, slow-paced fashion. Much too chatty, it does offer logical explanations for the so-called "supernatural" events, and also cleverly insinuates the legend of Jeremiah and Olivia into the Enrights' own troubled marital history." Tony Scott from Variety magazine wrote: "Sheedy plays her role with striking confidence, and Moses, who had a longtime run as Perry Mason’s associate Ken Malansky, gives his role a becoming sincerity. Maxine Stuart charmingly plays the former owner of the house, and Fletcher gives the story some surprising substance. The Mendocino house itself is a gem, and production designer Anthony Tremblay tries parlaying it into something frightening. Tech credits are good but the story’s not there. A ghost story’s disappointing if the blood runs thin, not cold."

== External ==
- The Haunting of Seacliff Inn at IMDb
- The Haunting of Seacliff Inn at Rotten Tomatoes
