= Margaret Ladd =

American actress (born 1945)

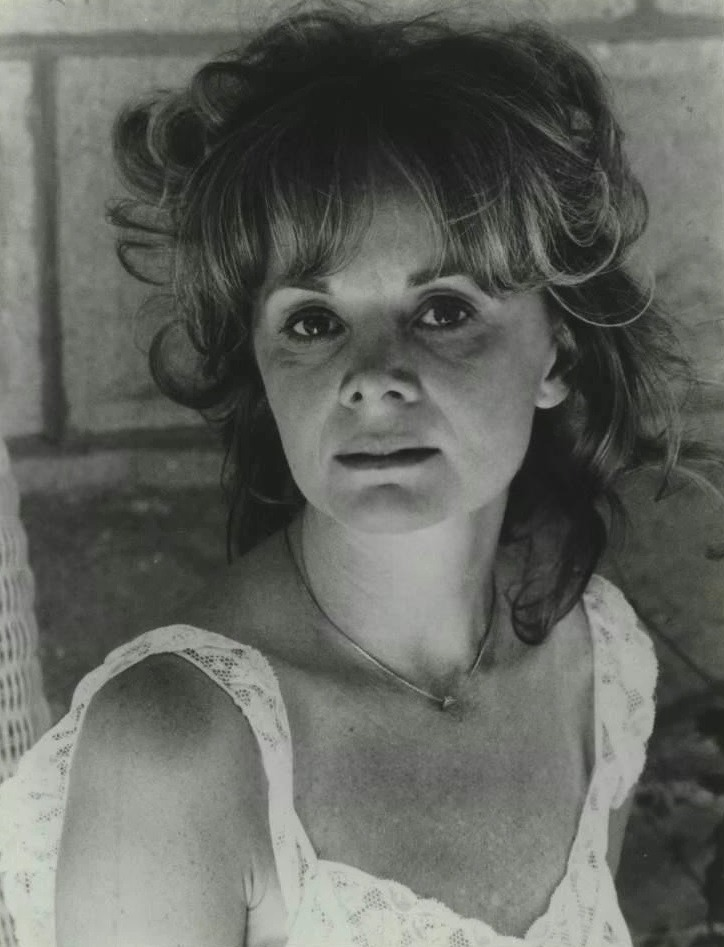
- Ladd in 1982
- Born: November 8, 1945 (age 80); Providence, Rhode Island, U.S.
- Occupation: Actress
- Years active: 1964–present
- Spouse: Lyle Kessler (m. 1977)
- Children: 2

Margaret Ladd (born November 8, 1945) is an American actress, best known for her role as Emma Channing in the CBS primetime soap opera, Falcon Crest (1981–90).

== Life and career ==
Ladd was born in Providence, Rhode Island. She began acting on the 1960s soap opera A Flame in the Wind as Jane Skerba from 1964 to 1965. She later starred in films include The Friends of Eddie Coyle (1973) and A Wedding (1978), and appeared on number of television shows. like Taxi and Quincy, M.E.. Ladd also co-starred in a number of made-for-television movies, and had supporting roles in films I'm Dancing as Fast as I Can, The Escape Artist, and The Whales of August. She also appeared in Broadway shows, like My Sweet Charlie and Sheep on the Runway.

Ladd is best known for playing Emma Channing in the 1980s CBS primetime soap opera, Falcon Crest throughout its nine-year run from 1981 to 1990. She had a small part in the film What's up, Scarlet? (2005); her first appearance after a hiatus of 14 years. In 2014, she appeared in two episodes of Amazon comedy-drama, Mozart in the Jungle. In 2016, Ladd was cast in the Woody Allen miniseries Crisis in Six Scenes for Amazon Studios.

Ladd married playwright Lyle Kessler in 1977, and they have two children.

== Filmography ==
=== Film ===
Year	Title	Role	Notes
1973	The Friends of Eddie Coyle	Andrea	
1978	A Wedding	Ruby Spar	
1982	I'm Dancing as Fast as I Can	Lara	
1982	The Escape Artist	Reporter #2	
1987	The Whales of August	Young Libby Strong	
2005	What's Up, Scarlet?	Estelle	
2016	As Constant as the Northern Star	Auggie	Short film
2019	Just in Time	Roberta	Short film
2023	The Country Club	Granny Lynn	

=== Television ===
Year	Title	Role	Notes
1964	A Flame in the Wind	Jane Skerba	TV series
1979	The Seeding of Sarah Burns	Bonnie	TV film
1979	Taxi	Miss Stallworth	"Honor Thy Father"
1980	Quincy, M.E.	Nurse Margaret Aldred	"Cover-Up"
1980	The Love Tapes	Gloria	TV film
1981–1989	Falcon Crest	Emma Channing	Series regular, 193 episodes Soap Opera Digest Award for Outstanding Actress/Actor in a Comic Relief Role on a Prime Time Serial (1986)
1987	Hotel	Libby	"Unfinished Business"
1992	Reasonable Doubts	Libby Morris	"The Shadow of Death"
2014–15	Mozart in the Jungle	Claire	"You Have Insulted Tchaikovsky", "You Go to My Head", "Leave Everything Behind"
2016	Crisis in Six Scenes	Gail	3 episodes
2020	At Home with Amy Sedaris	Queen Sigrid	Episode: "Travel"
