= Crisis in Six Scenes =

2016 American comedy television miniseries

- Promotional poster
- Genre: Comedy
- Created by: Woody Allen
- Written by: Woody Allen
- Directed by: Woody Allen
- Starring: Woody Allen; Miley Cyrus; Elaine May; Rachel Brosnahan; John Magaro
- Country of origin: United States
- Original language: English
- No. of episodes: 6

Production
- Executive producer: Erika Aronson
- Producer: Helen Robin
- Cinematography: Eigil Bryld
- Editor: Alisa Lepselter
- Running time: 24–25 minutes
- Production companies: Amazon Studios; Gravier Productions

Original release
- Network: Amazon Prime Video
- Release: September 30, 2016

Crisis in Six Scenes is an American comedy television miniseries written and directed by Woody Allen for Amazon Studios. Allen wrote and directed six episodes for the half-hour series.

The series premiered on Amazon Prime Video on September 30, 2016, to generally unfavorable reviews.

== Plot ==
In 1960s, a middle class suburban family is visited by a mysterious visitor who turns their household upside down.

== Cast and characters ==
=== Main ===
- Woody Allen as Sidney Munsinger
- Miley Cyrus as Lennie Dale
- Elaine May as Kay Munsinger
- Rachel Brosnahan as Ellie
- John Magaro as Allen Brockman

=== Guest ===
- Becky Ann Baker as Lee
- Lewis Black as Al
- Max Casella as Dominic
- Joy Behar as Ann
- Marylouise Burke as Lucy
- Julie Halston as Roz
- Sondra James as Rita
- Margaret Ladd as Gail
- Rebecca Schull as Rose
- Douglas McGrath as Doug
- Kaili Vernoff as Jane
- David Harbour as Vic
- Bobby Slayton as Mel
- Nina Arianda as Lorna
- Gad Elmaleh as Moe
- Christine Ebersole as Eve, Allen's mother
- Tom Kemp as Lou, Ellie's father
- Boris McGiver as Sy, Allen's father
- Michael Rapaport as Trooper Mike
- Deborah Rush as Judy, Ellie's mother

== Episodes ==
No.	Title	Directed by	Written by	Original release date
1	"Episode #1.1"	Woody Allen	Woody Allen	September 30, 2016
A middle-class suburban home- all seems well until a dangerous intruder enters in the dead of night.
2	"Episode #1.2"	Woody Allen	Woody Allen	September 30, 2016
An intruder causes terrible panic and tension in a usually placid household.
3	"Episode #1.3"	Woody Allen	Woody Allen	September 30, 2016
Because of an armed intruder, after a home invasion, a married couple's life is turned upside-down.
4	"Episode #1.4"	Woody Allen	Woody Allen	September 30, 2016
Romantic alliances fray and conflict in the suburban home reaches a boiling point.
5	"Episode #1.5"	Woody Allen	Woody Allen	September 30, 2016
A middle-class husband and wife put their lives in jeopardy carrying out a dangerous assignment.
6	"Episode #1.6"	Woody Allen	Woody Allen	September 30, 2016
Finally a resolution but not before chaos, surprising disclosures, police and guns come into play.

== Production ==
=== Development ===
The deal with Allen was seen as giving Amazon a possible advantage in its competition with Netflix and television networks. The series was announced within days of Amazon winning the Golden Globe Award for the comedy-drama Transparent, another original series. Allen had last written new material for television in the 1950s, when he wrote for Sid Caesar.

In a May 2015 interview, Allen said that progress on the series had been "very, very difficult" and that he had "regretted every second since I said OK". Allen has said of the series, "I don't know how I got into this. I have no ideas and I'm not sure where to begin. My guess is that Roy Price [the head of Amazon Studios] will regret this."

=== Casting ===
In January 2016, it was announced that the series would star Allen, Elaine May and Miley Cyrus, and that shooting would begin in March. In February 2016, it was announced that John Magaro and Rachel Brosnahan had joined the cast. In March 2016, Michael Rapaport, Becky Ann Baker, Margaret Ladd, Joy Behar, Rebecca Schull, David Harbour, and Christine Ebersole had joined the cast of the series.

=== Filming ===
For approximately three weeks in early 2016, filming for the six episodes took place at 508 Scarborough Road, in Briarcliff Manor, New York.

== Reception ==
=== Critical response ===
On the review aggregator website Rotten Tomatoes, the series holds an approval rating of 18% based on 50 reviews, with an average rating of 4.7/10. The website's critics consensus reads, "Woody Allen's filmmaking skills prove a poor fit for the small screen in Crisis in Six Scenes, a talk-heavy, unfunny, and overall disengaged production buried below numerous superior offerings." On Metacritic, the series has a score 44 out of 100, based on 29 critics, indicating "mixed or average reviews".

Rodrigo Perez from The Playlist gave the series a D+ on an A+ to F scale, and described it as "nearly unwatchable". Robert Bianco of USA Today was more positive, writing "Crisis is not Allen at his peak, nor at his most serious and contemplative as an artist. Crisis is a bauble, a light comedy that starts very slowly and builds to a satisfyingly funny conclusion." He also praised the performances of Allen and May, stating "Not only is it great to see them performing so well together, it's just a nice change of pace to see a comedy about two married senior citizens where the casting is age appropriate and the story is not built around senility or mortality."

The Los Angeles Times wrote: "This isn't Allen at his wittiest or wildest—his career is almost by definition a thing of peaks and valleys, and he can be satisfying and frustrating within a single film. But he has a voice, and he has not yet lost it. Anyone susceptible to that sensibility will find many familiar pleasures here," and further stated "as the work that has returned Elaine May to public view, it can only be welcomed, with rose petals and trumpets. And it does well by her." The New York Times stated: "In recent years, Mr. Allen's movies have swung wildly in quality, alternating real highs with definite lows. Crisis sits in between. It's closer to the low end, but for fans of a certain earlier strain of his work, its shambling, amiable vibe may seem comfortingly familiar."

==== Allen's reaction ====
Allen himself had openly expressed severe misgivings about the project, and denounced the series, stating that it would conclude with one season. At the 2015 Cannes Film Festival, Allen said in reference to the show, "It was a catastrophic mistake. I don't know what I'm doing. I'm floundering. I expect this to be a cosmic embarrassment."
