= David Selby =

American actor

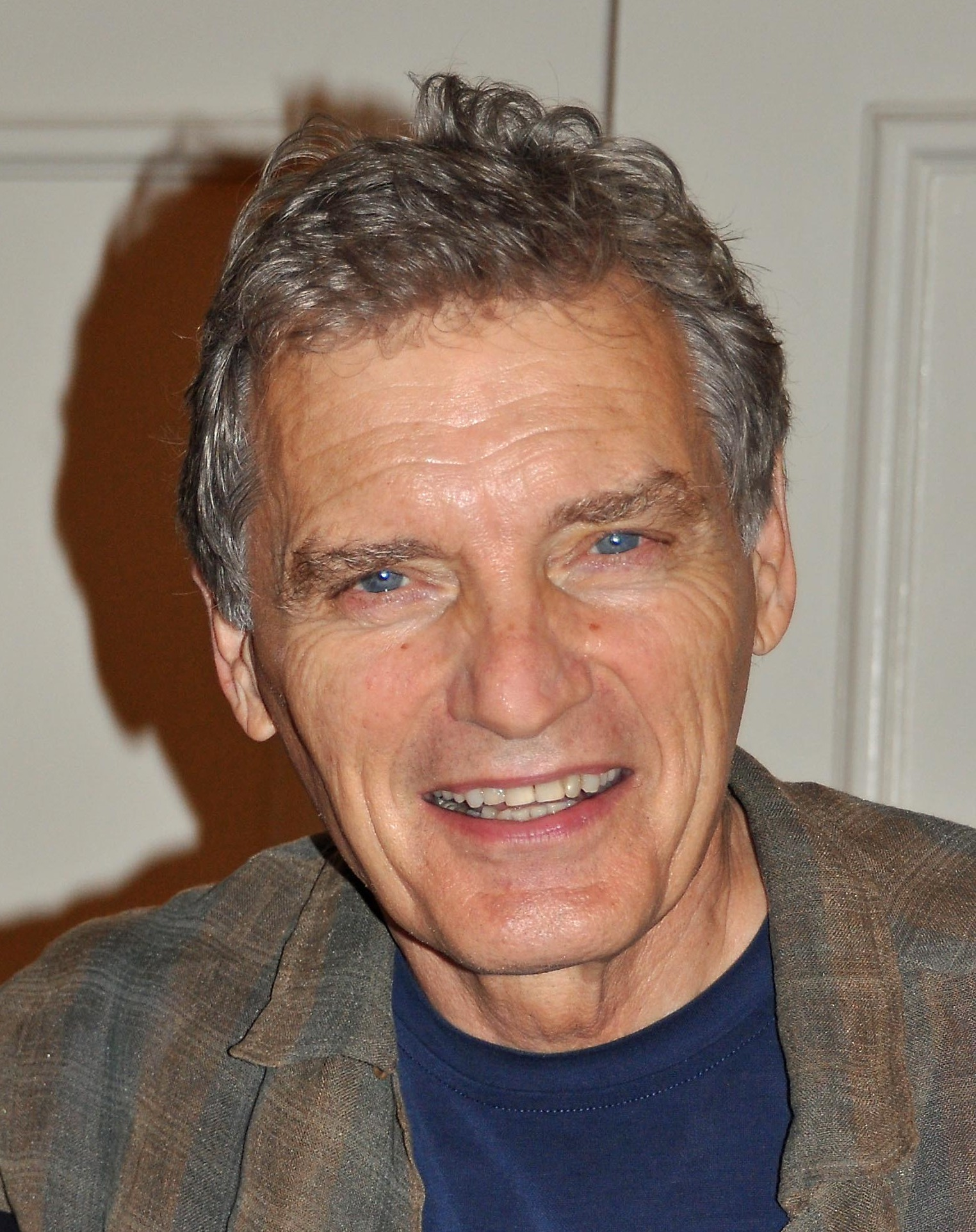
- Selby in 2011
- Born: David Lynn Selby; February 5, 1941 (age 85); Morgantown, West Virginia, U.S.
- Occupations: Actor, writer
- Years active: 1968–present
- Spouse: Claudeis “Chip” Newman (m. 1963)
- Children: 3

David Lynn Selby (born February 5, 1941) is an American film, television, and stage actor and writer. He played Quentin Collins on the daytime soap Dark Shadows (1968–1971) and Richard Channing on the prime-time soap Falcon Crest (1982–1990). Selby also had prominent roles in the television series Flamingo Road (1981–1982) and the feature film Raise the Titanic (1980).

== Early life ==
David Selby was born February 5, 1941, in Morgantown, West Virginia, the son of Clyde Ira Selby, a carpenter, and his wife Sarah E. (née McIntyre). He recalled in 2020 interview, "I enjoyed a safe, happy life; I grew up in Morgantown and still have good friends back there, people I've known since grade school. West Virginia's a fantastic place to raise kids. The environment's nurturing and positive."

Midway through his time at WVU, Selby joined the cast of Honey in the Rock, a civil war drama at Grandview State Park.

== Career ==
=== Early TV and film roles (1960s and 1970s) ===
Selby became active in theatre, which he has always described as his favorite medium, and was among the cast for a national tour of The Impossible Years. In 1968, Selby joined the cast of the TV series Dark Shadows first as the ghost of Quentin Collins, and later as Quentin Collins, the werewolf. He had not heard of Dark Shadows at the time, and was invited to audition after a talent agent saw him perform in a production of Summer and Smoke. Selby was taken off-guard when the role turned him into a teenybopper icon, with fans following him when he left the studio at night and his face emblazoned on the covers of magazines such as 16, but has said that he appreciated the fans' devotion and support, and that they were never unpleasant or intrusive. After the series' cancellation in 1971, Selby played Quentin Collins in Night of Dark Shadows, the second feature film based on the show, released later the same year. He reprised the role from the series for a series of Dark Shadows audio dramas from Big Finish Productions, beginning in 2004.

In 1972, Selby co-starred with Barbra Streisand in the movie Up the Sandbox. He continued to appear in a number of film and television roles during the 1970s, including U-Turn (1973), The Super Cops (1974) and Rich Kids (1979), and episodes of The Waltons (1974), Police Woman (1975), and Kojak (1976). He was part of the cast in the Emmy Award-winning miniseries Washington: Behind Closed Doors (1977).

=== 1980s ===
Selby was nominated for a Golden Raspberry Award for Worst Supporting Actor at the 1st Golden Raspberry Awards for his role in the 1980 film Raise the Titanic, which was met with a negative reception from critics, along with poor box-office takings.

In 1981, Selby played the villainous Michael Tyrone in the final season of the prime-time serial Flamingo Road. After its cancellation in 1982, he joined the cast of Falcon Crest as Richard Channing, the illegitimate son of Jacqueline Perrault (Lana Turner) with Angela Channing (Jane Wyman)'s husband Douglas Channing (Stephen Elliott). Originally considered an antagonist, Richard gradually became more of a protagonist, and by the final season, he was the central character of the show (in part due to the health-related absence of Wyman). In all, Selby appeared in 209 episodes of the series.

=== Later career ===
Selby continued in numerous film and TV roles during the 1990s and 2000s, including Dying Young (1991), White Squall (1996) and Surviving Christmas (2004), and episodes of series such as Cold Case (2007) and Mad Men (2009).

To mark the 200th anniversary of Abraham Lincoln's birthday in 2009, Selby appeared onstage with Barack Obama and portrayed Lincoln in a scene from the play The Heavens Are Hung in Black at the reopening of Ford's Theatre. Selby had also played Abraham Lincoln in a 1998 fifth season episode of the series Touched by an Angel, titled "Beautiful Dreamer".

Selby made an appearance in the 2012 film adaptation of Dark Shadows, one of four cast members from the original series to feature in the movie. The same year, he co-starred in Batman: The Dark Knight Returns, a two-part direct-to-video animated film adaptation of the 1986 graphic novel The Dark Knight Returns, portraying Commissioner James Gordon. In 2017, Selby had a recurring role in the drama Legion.

== Writing ==
Selby is also a writer. His work includes the plays Lincoln and James and Final Assault as well as the poetry collections My Mother's Autumn and Happenstance. He has written two novels, Lincoln's Better Angel and The Blue Door. A Better Place combines memoir and social commentary to discuss Selby's upbringing. In 2010, he published My Shadowed Past, chronicling what it was like to work on Dark Shadows.

== Filmography ==
=== Films ===
Year	Title	Role	Notes
1971	Night of Dark Shadows	Quentin Collins/Charles Collins	
1972	Up the Sandbox	Paul Reynolds	
1973	U-Turn	Scott Laithem	
1974	The Super Cops	Robert Hantz	
1979	Rich Kids	Steve Sloan	
1980	Raise the Titanic	Dr. Gene Seagram	Nominated — Golden Raspberry Award for Worst Supporting Actor
1981	Rich and Famous	Doug Blake	
1991	Dying Young	Richard Geddes	
1993	The Shot	Gordon Sunshine	
1994	Intersection	Richard Quarry	
1995	Headless Body in Topless Bar	Bradford Lumpkin	
1996	White Squall	Francis Beaumont	
1996	D3: The Mighty Ducks	Dean Buckley	
2004	Shadow of Fear	Mr. Steve Palmer	
2004	Surviving Christmas	Horace Vangilder	
2004	The Affair	Vincent	
2006	End Game	Shakey Fuller	
2006	Unknown	Police Captain Parker	
2007	Spin	Rob Polan	
2010	Inhale	Henry White	
2010	The Social Network	Gage	
2012	Dark Shadows	Party Guest	
2012	Batman: The Dark Night Returns, Part 1	Commissioner James Gordon (voice)	
2013	Batman: The Dark Night Returns, Part 2	Commissioner James Gordon (voice)	
2013	Are You Here	Karl Stevens	
2015	Equals	Leonard	
2017	Newness	Artie Hallock	
2017	Smartass	Herman	
2019	Back Fork	Bill	
2019	Loon Lake	Emery Janson/Pastor Owen Janson	

=== Television ===
Year	Title	Role	Notes
1968-1971	Dark Shadows	Quentin Collins	312 episodes
1974	The Waltons	Joshua Williams	episode: "The Romance"
1975	Police Woman	Nate Fesler	episode: "No Place to Hide"
1975	ABC's Wide World of Entertainment	Jack 243	episode: "The Norming of Jack 243"
1976	Kojak	Sgt. Jimmy O'Connor	episode: "An Unfair Trade"
1977	Washington: Behind Closed Doors	Roger Castle	miniseries
1977	Telethon	Roy Hansen	TV movie
1978	Family	Michael Kagan	episode: "More Than Friends"
1979	The Night Rider	Lord Thomas Earl	TV movie
1979	Love for Rent	Phil	TV movie
1980	Doctor Franken	Dr. Mike Foster	TV movie
1981-1982	Flamingo Road	Michael Tyrone	18 episodes
1982-1990	Falcon Crest	Richard Channing	209 episodes Soap Opera Digest Award: Outstanding Actor in a Leading Role: Prime Time (1989); Nominated — Soap Opera Digest Award: Outstanding Actress/Actor in a Comic Relief Role on a Prime Time Serial; Outstanding Villain on a Prime Time Serial; Outstanding Actor in a Leading Role on a Prime Time Serial (1986) nominated — Soap Opera Digest Award: Outstanding Actor in a Leading Role: Prime Time (1988) nominated — Soap Opera Digest Award: Outstanding Villain: Prime Time (1990)
1988	King of the Olympics: The Lives and Loves of Avery Brundage	Avery Brundage	TV movie
1992	Grave Secrets: The Legacy of Hilltop Drive	Shag Williams	TV movie
1992	Lady Boss	Martin Swanson	miniseries
1997	Soldier of Fortune	Xavier Trout	TV movie
1997	Alone	Paul	TV movie
1997	Promised Land	Rowdy Sullivan	episode: "Cowboy Blues"
1997-1999	Soldier of Fortune, Inc.	Xavier Trout	9 episodes
1998	Touched by an Angel	Abraham Lincoln	episode: "Beautiful Dreamer"
2001	Ally McBeal	Mr. Rohr	episode: "I Want Love"
2002	The Griffin and the Minor Canon	The Griffin (voice)	TV movie
2002	Thieves	Donovan	episode: "The Green and the Black"
2005	Larva	Fletcher Odermatt	TV movie
2006	The Black Hole	Ryker	TV movie
2007	Tell Me You Love Me	Arthur Foster	9 episodes
2007	Cold Case	Dom Barron '07	episode: "Boy Crazy"
2008	Raising the Bar	Richard Patrick Woolsey III	episode: "Richie Richer"
2009	Mad Men	Horace Cook, Sr.	episode: "The Arrangements"
2011	Deck the Halls	Luke Reilly	TV movie
2013	Rizzoli & Isles	Senator Malcolm Humphrey	episode: "We Are Family"
2016	Dr. Del	Grover	TV movie
2017-2018	Legion	Brubaker	4 episodes
2018	Castle Rock	Josef Desjardins	episode: "The Box"
2020	Chicago Fire	Tim Larson	episode: "A Chicago Welcome"
2020	NCIS: New Orleans	Red	episode: "Relentless"
