= A Flame in the Wind =

American TV soap opera

- Genre: Soap opera
- Created by: Raphael Hayes and Joseph Hardy
- Written by: Gordon Russell
- Directed by: Alan Pultz
- Country of origin: United States
- No. of episodes: 515

Production
- Running time: 30 minutes

Original release
- Network: ABC
- Release: December 28, 1964 – December 16, 1966

A Flame in the Wind (renamed A Time for Us in 1965) is an American soap opera that aired on ABC Daytime from December 28, 1964, to December 16, 1966. It was created by Raphael Hayes, co-author of the Cannes Film Festival winner One Potato, Two Potato and Joseph Hardy, producer of the soap opera Love of Life. It was videotaped live daily at ABC's Manhattan studios at 121 W 68th St, New York City.

== Background ==
Attempting to build upon its two soap line-up of General Hospital and The Young Marrieds, ABC premiered this rather traditional series about class conflict in the small town of Haviland. Oddly, ABC chose not to air A Flame in the Wind immediately before General Hospital as would have been expected. Instead, the series was followed by the long-running courtroom anthology series Day in Court which then led into General Hospital. At the time of its debut in December 1964, A Flame in the Wind aired opposite the hugely popular game show Password on CBS, and The Loretta Young Theatre on NBC. The ratings for A Flame in the Wind were not impressive.

In 1965, ABC hired soap opera creator/writer Irna Phillips as an executive story consultant. (Just a year before, Phillips had been brought on board by ABC to help develop the novel and feature film Peyton Place into a prime-time serial.) On her recommendation, the title of the show was changed from the overly poetic A Flame in the Wind to the more appropriately soapy A Time for Us, and the name of the show’s leading family was changed from Skerba to Driscoll. To coincide with the name change, ABC changed the timeslot of the series, replacing Day in Court and using A Time for Us as the lead-in for General Hospital. A Flame in the Wind was replaced in the 2:00 p. m. slot by the musical variety series Where the Action Is.

The changes to the series did succeed in raising the ratings significantly. For the 1964-1965 TV season, A Flame in the Wind received a 2.8 ratings. For the 1965-1966 TV season, A Time for Us improved to a 4.0 rating. However, ratings then leveled off. Despite the improvements, the soap was still the lowest rated soap opera on the air (other, lower rated soap operas, proceeded to pass it when their ratings passed A Time for Us). Not seeing any potential for future ratings growth, ABC cancelled the series in October 1966 and replaced it with the beauty pageant/game show Dream Girl of '67.

== Synopsis ==
The show focused on the community of Haviland and its citizens. The main families were the Skerba, Reynolds, Austens, and Farrells.

When the series began, Haviland's richest citizen, widowed Kate Austen (Kathleen Maguire) wrote a novel, in the same manner as Main Street, which showed Haviland's citizens in a less than perfect light. After the novel was stopped by her publisher, she and her son, Chris (Richard Thomas), left Haviland, never to return. Her former mother-in-law, Louise Austen (Josephine Nichols) remained in town to become a friend to Jason Farrell (Walter Coy), who had marital troubles with his wife, Leslie (Rita Lloyd); Kate's place as town gossip was taken by Miriam Bentley (Lesley Woods).

The later stories were focused on young love, embodied by the two Skerba sisters, Linda (Barbara Rodell; Jane Elliot) and Jane (Beverly Hayes; Margaret Ladd), battling over the same young man, Steve Reynolds, the son of Kate's former book publisher, Craig Reynolds (Frank Schofield). Linda, who eventually went to New York, to become an actress, dated her director, Paul Davis (Conard Fowkes); and sensible Jane remained behind in Haviland and married Steve Reynolds (Gordon Gray; Tom Holland). However, later on, Linda and wealthy Roxanne Farrell Reynolds (Margaret Hayes) vied for the same guy, Doug Colton (Ion Berger), who eventually married Roxanne for her money.

When the show's title was changed to A Time for Us, (the title which it became better known) the Skerba family (besides Jane and Linda, the family included their father Al (Roy Poole), a construction foreman; and Martha (Lenka Peterson), the sympathetic mother) underwent a name change as well.

Since the name, Skerba, was considered somewhat ethnic for the time, it was changed to the more Americanized name of Driscoll. Which was successful in that it eliminated the class conflict that had been part of the show's first year and put the Driscolls on the same social footing as the other families of Haviland.

The series is notable for beginning many careers of performers. Leslie Charleson, Jane Elliot, Margaret Ladd, Terry Logan, Barbara Rodell and Jenny O'Hara are among them. Oscar-nominated actress Anne Revere also appeared on this show.
