= Barbara Rodell =

American actress

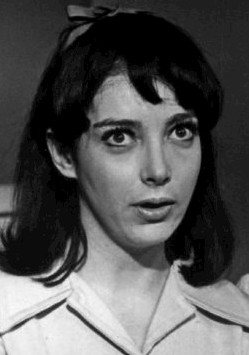
- Rodell on Another World in 1968
- Born: Barbara Wohl; Brooklyn, New York, U.S.
- Education: Brooklyn College
- Occupation: Actress

Barbara Rodell (née Wohl, 1945 or 1946) is an American actress known for roles on numerous soap operas during the 1960s and 1970s.

== Early years ==
The daughter of a Brooklyn truck driver and his wife, Rodell was a premature baby who weighed 1.5 pounds at birth. She was born in Brooklyn and moved to Manhattan when she was four. The Henry Street Settlement and the Dramatic Workshop provided early training in drama, and she studied liberal arts at Brooklyn College. At age 17 she disregarded her father's opposition to her becoming an actress and left home. She worked as a waitress and a model while she sought acting opportunities.

== Career ==
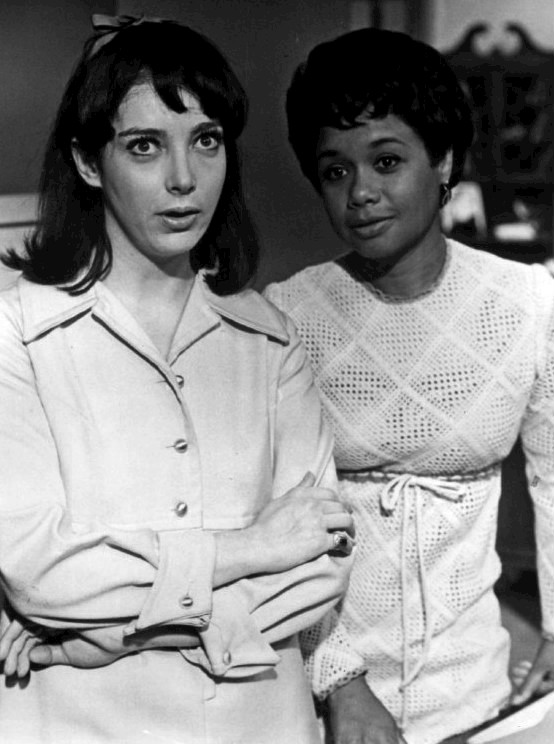
Rodell (left) with Micki Grant on Another World, 1968

Rodell debuted as a professional actress when she worked in summer stock theatre in State College, Pennsylvania. Performing in other stock theater companies added to her experience.

Her first television part was on the short-lived serial A Flame in the Wind in which she played the character of Linda Skerba in 1965. She then took over the role of Lee Randolph on Another World, playing the part from 1967 until 1969, when the character was killed off in a car crash. Rodell next appeared on The Secret Storm during 1969–1970, playing Jill Clayborn, until that character perished in an airplane crash. She subsequently took over the role of Leslie Jackson Bauer Norris at Guiding Light, appearing there from 1971 until 1973. Rodell then moved to As the World Turns where she had her longest tenure (1973–1981) playing the part of Joyce Colman.

Rodell also was in the film The Devil's Commandment.
