= Susan Sullivan =

American actress

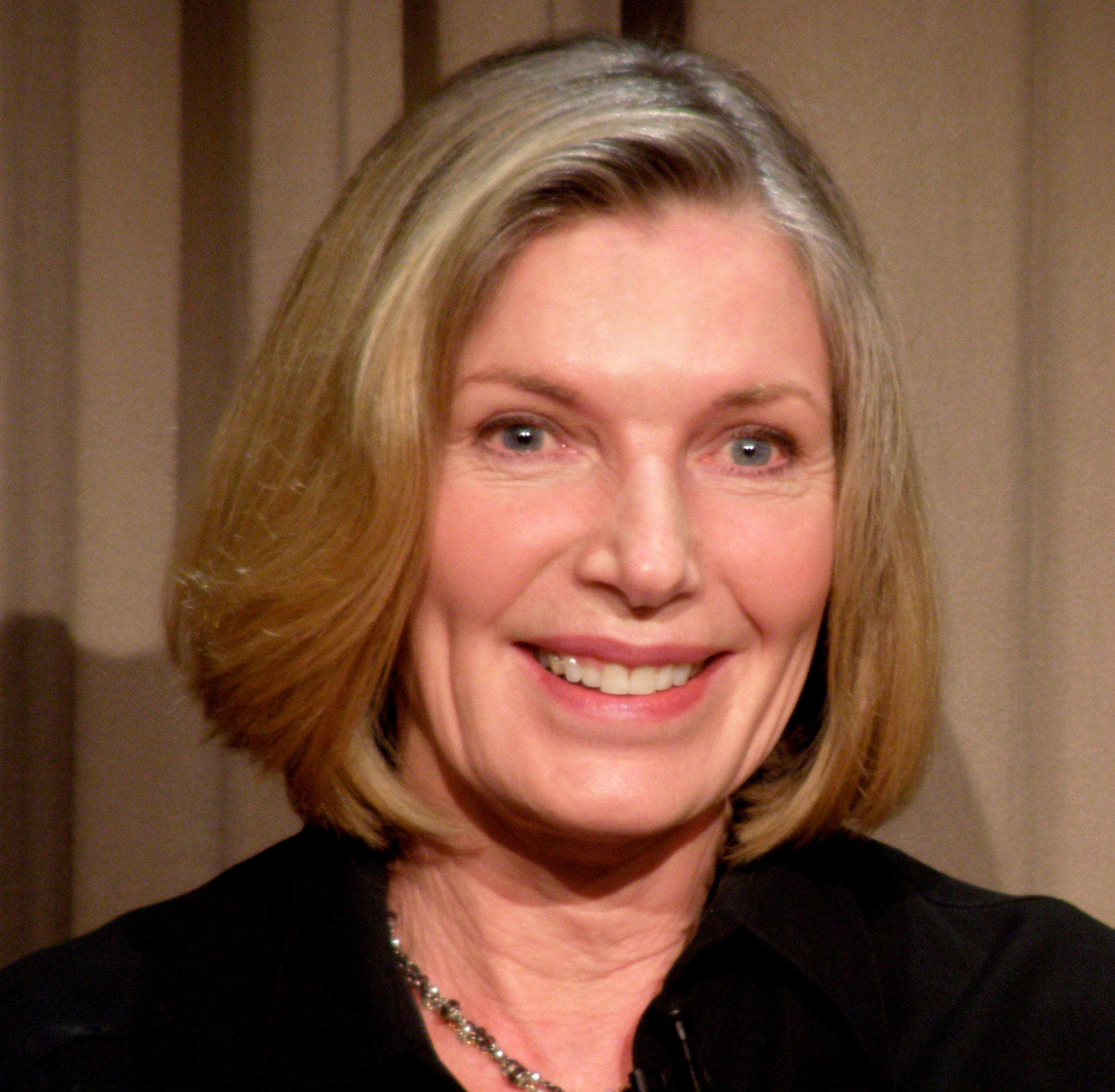
- Sullivan in 2010
- Born: November 18, 1942 (age 83); New York City, U.S.
- Education: Hofstra University
- Occupation: Actress
- Years active: 1964–present
- Partner: Connell Cowan

Susan Sullivan (born November 18, 1942) is an American actress known for her roles as Lenore Curtin Delaney on the NBC daytime soap opera Another World (1971–1976), as Lois Adams on the ABC sitcom It's a Living (1980–1981), as Maggie Gioberti Channing on the CBS primetime soap opera Falcon Crest (1981–1990), as Kitty Montgomery on the ABC sitcom Dharma & Greg (1997–2002), and as Martha Rodgers on Castle (2009–2016). She earned an Emmy nomination for Lead Actress for the role of Julie Farr in the 1978 series Julie Farr, M.D. and a Golden Globe nomination for Supporting Actress for her role in Dharma & Greg.

== Life and career ==
Sullivan was born in New York City, the daughter of Helen (née Rockett) and Brendan Sullivan, an advertising executive. She was raised on Long Island in Freeport, Nassau County, where she graduated from Freeport High School in 1960. She earned a BA in drama from Hofstra University in 1964.

She got her start in acting in the 1960s playing opposite Dustin Hoffman in the Broadway play Jimmy Shine. She landed a contract with Universal Studios in 1969, guest-starring on several series. It was during this time that she played roles in daytime dramas.

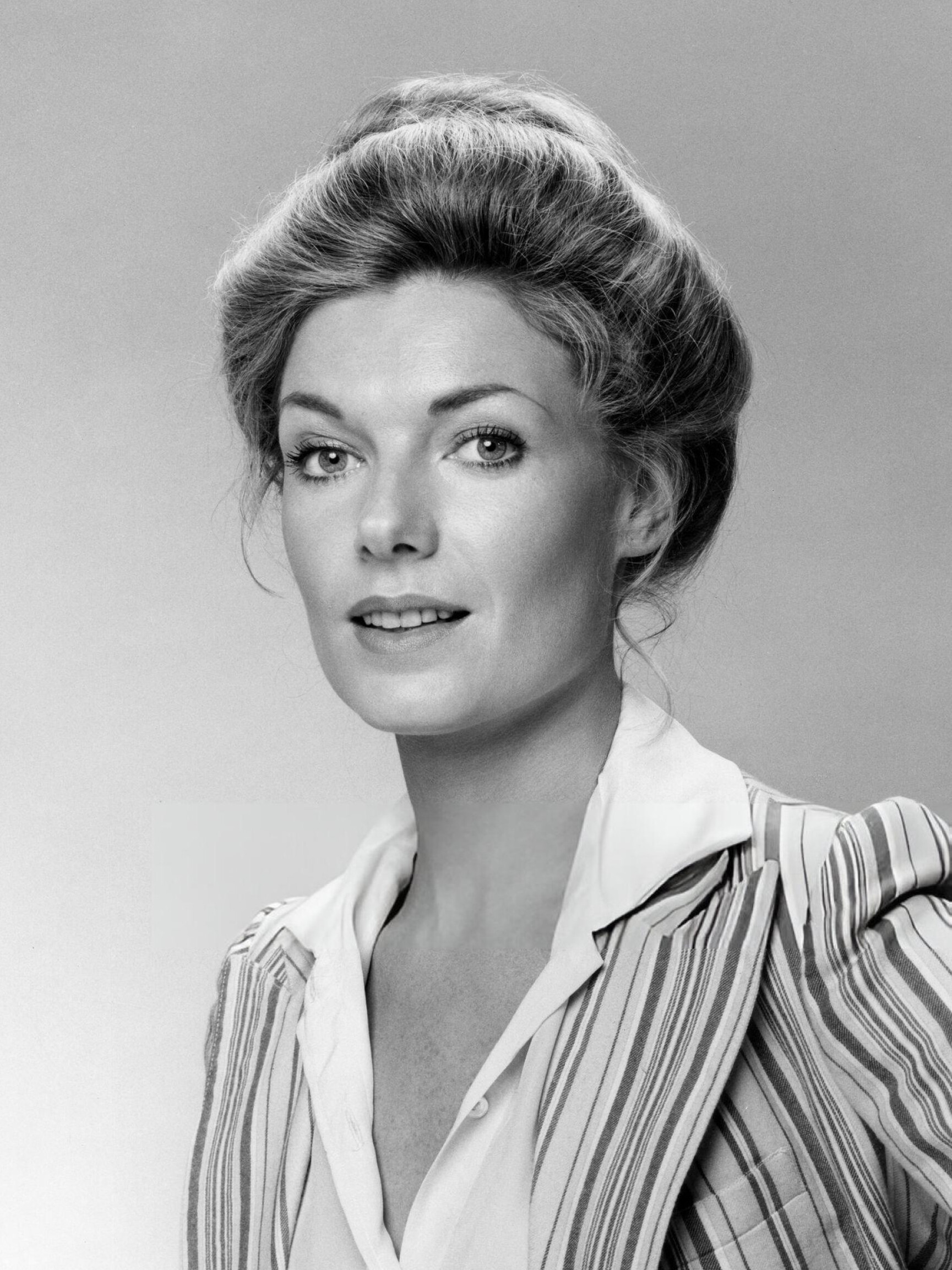
Sullivan in Rich Man, Poor Man, Book II (1976)

Starting with a role on A World Apart in 1970, she moved to a five-year stint as Lenore Moore Curtin Delaney on the daytime soap opera Another World. Taking over from Judith Barcroft, Sullivan played the role from 1971 to 1976. She played Charlton Heston's girlfriend Ann, a new character written into the television version of the film Midway (1976). She then played Dr. Elaina Marks opposite Bill Bixby in the Incredible Hulk pilot in 1977 and portrayed Poker Alice opposite James Garner as Bret Maverick on The New Maverick the following year. Sullivan also appeared in Barnaby Jones; episode titled “Final Judgement”(01/26/1978).

She played the role of Maggie Porter in the television drama Rich Man, Poor Man Book II. She played Dr. Julie Farr in Having Babies from 1978 to 1979, and was nominated for a Primetime Emmy Award for Outstanding Lead Actress in a Drama Series, which was made into two television films and later a short-lived weekly series in 1978. During a week in February 1978, she was a panelist on Match Game, both on CBS and in syndication. In 1980, she appeared on the sitcom It's a Living, playing head waitress Lois Adams.

In 1981, Sullivan won the role of Maggie Gioberti in the CBS primetime soap drama Falcon Crest, replacing Samantha Eggar, who had appeared in the pilot. The series became a hit and Maggie became Sullivan's most prominent role to date. She appeared on the series from 1981 to 1989, during which time she was nominated for three Soap Opera Digest awards. At the time Sullivan decided to leave the series in 1989, she had appeared in every episode of the series up to that date (207 of the 227 episodes produced). Sullivan appeared in the first two episodes of season nine, when her character drowned.

Following Falcon Crest, Sullivan appeared on The George Carlin Show, co-starred on the short-lived political drama The Monroes in the mid-1990s, and played a supporting role in the film My Best Friend's Wedding (as the mother of Cameron Diaz's character) (1997). On Dharma & Greg, she played the snooty country-club matriarch Kitty Montgomery from 1997 to 2002. The series reunited Sullivan with actor Mitchell Ryan (who played her husband Edward), with whom she had worked on Having Babies. She appeared in four episodes in season three of Hope and Faith as Nancy Lombard, Faith's therapist. Sullivan voiced Queen Hippolyta on the animated series Justice League and Justice League Unlimited. She has also appeared on the television series Brothers & Sisters, Joan of Arcadia, Two and a Half Men, Dead Like Me, The Kominsky Method, and Last Man Standing.

From 2009 to 2016, Sullivan co-starred alongside Nathan Fillion, Stana Katic and Molly Quinn on Castle. Her character Martha Rodgers' acting career has somewhat paralleled her own, including references to appearances on soap operas.

== Personal life ==
In 2023, Sullivan was diagnosed with lung cancer and underwent surgery to have it removed.

== Filmography ==
Year	Title	Role	Notes
1967	The Winter's Tale	Perdita	Television film
1968	Macbeth	Third Witch	Television film
1970	The Best of Everything	April Morrison	Series regular
1970–1971	A World Apart	Nancy Condon	Series regular (324 episodes)
1971–1976	Another World	Lenore Moore Curtin Delaney	Series regular (221 episodes)
1972	Between Time and Timbuktu	Nancy	Television film
1975	Medical Center	Joanna Courtney	Episode: "No Hiding Place"
1975	S.W.A.T.	Julia	Episode: "The Vendetta"
1975	McMillan & Wife	Maggie Arnaud	Episode: "Requiem for a Bride"
1975	Petrocelli	Janet Wilson	Episode: "Too Many Alibis"
1976	Barnaby Jones	Ruth Sorrell	Episode: "Deadline for Dying"
1976	Bert D'Angelo/Superstar	Sharon Andress	Episode: "Scag"
1976	Bell, Book and Candle	Rosemary	Television film
1976–1977	Kojak	Carol Krug; Kelly McCall	2 episodes
1976–1977	Rich Man, Poor Man Book II	Maggie Porter	Series regular (20 episodes)
1977	The City	Carol Carter	Television film
1977	The Incredible Hulk	Dr. Elaina Marks	Television pilot
1977	Roger & Harry: The Mitera Target	Cindy St. Claire	Television film
1977	The Magnificent Magical Magnet of Santa Mesa	C.B. Macauley	Television film
1977	Having Babies II	Dr. Julie Farr	Television film
1978	Barnaby Jones	Linda Gates	Episode: "Final Judgment
1978	Julie Farr, M.D.	Dr. Julie Farr	Series regular (7 episodes); Nominated – Primetime Emmy Award for Outstanding Lead Actress in a Drama Series
1978	Deadman's Curve	Rainbow	Television film
1978	Having Babies III	Dr. Julie Farr	Television film
1978	The Comedy Company	Linda Greg	Television film
1978	Killer's Delight	Dr. Carol Thompson	
1978	The New Maverick	'Poker' Alice Ivers	Television film
1979	Breaking Up Is Hard to Do	Diane Sealey	Television film
1979	The Love Boat	Dr. Emily Bradford	Episode: "Doc, Be Patient"
1980	Taxi	Nora Chandliss	Episode: "What Price Bobby?"
1980	Marriage Is Alive and Well	Sara Fish	Television film
1980	The Ordeal of Dr. Mudd	Frances Mudd	Television film
1980	City in Fear	Madeleine Crawford	Television film
1980–1981	It's a Living	Lois Adams	Series regular (13 episodes)
1981	Fantasy Island	Dorothy Nicholson	Episode: "Perfect Husband, The/Volcano"
1981–1989	Falcon Crest	Maggie Gioberti Channing	Series regular (207 episodes); Nominated - Soap Opera Digest Award for Outstanding Actress in a Leading Role: Prime Time (1988–89)
1983	Cave-In!	Senator Kate Lassiter	Television film
1986	Rage of Angels: The Story Continues	Mary Beth Warner	Television film
1990	Doctor Doctor	Laura Stratford	Episode: "Family Affair"
1991	Perry Mason: The Case of the Ruthless Reporter	Twyla Cooper	Television film
1994	A Perfect Stranger	Kaye	Television film
1994–1995	The George Carlin Show	Kathleen Rachowski	Recurring role (7 episodes)
1995	The Monroes	Kathryn Monroe	Series regular (8 episodes)
1997	My Best Friend's Wedding	Isabelle Wallace	
1997	Two Came Back	Patricia Clarkson	Television film
1997–2002	Dharma & Greg	Kitty Montgomery	Series regular (119 episodes); Nominated – Golden Globe Award for Best Supporting Actress – Series, Miniseries or Television Film (1999); Viewers for Quality Television Award for Best Supporting Actress in a Comedy Series (1998, 2000)
2001	Puzzled	Anabel Norton	
2001–2002	Justice League	Hippolyta (voice)	3 episodes
2003	Dead Like Me	Mary Kate Hourihan	Episode: "Business Unfinished"
2003	I'm with Her	Rosalyn	Episode: "Meet the Parent"
2004	Joan of Arcadia	Rich Woman God	Episode: "The Gift"
2005	Judging Amy	Patricia Millhouse	2 episodes
2005	Justice League Unlimited	Hippolyta (voice)	Episode: "The Balance"
2005–2006	Hope & Faith	Nancy Lombard	Recurring role (4 episodes)
2006	Two and a Half Men	Dorothy	Episode: "Walnuts and Demerol"
2006–2007	The Nine	Nancy Hale	Recurring role (7 episodes)
2007	Brothers & Sisters	Miranda Jones	Episode: "Game Night"
2009–2016	Castle	Martha Rodgers	Series regular (173 episodes)
2017	The Real O'Neals	Victoria Murray	Episode: "The Real Secrets"
2017–2020	Big Hero 6: The Series	Mrs. Frederickson (voice)	4 episodes
2018	The Amaranth	Patsy Howard	
2018–2019	The Kominsky Method	Eileen	Recurring role (8 episodes)
2018–2020	Last Man Standing	Bonnie	Recurring role (5 episodes)
2021–2023	Smartphone Theatre	Bevi	2 episodes
2022	The Drop	Lex's Mom	
2022	Diary of a Spy	S	
2022	The Grotto	Lila Kendall	
2026	Magic Hour	Diane	
