= Falcon Crest =

American television series

- Main title card (season 9)
- Genre: Soap opera
- Created by: Earl Hamner Jr.
- Starring: Jane Wyman; Robert Foxworth; Susan Sullivan; Lorenzo Lamas; David Selby; Abby Dalton; Margaret Ladd; William R. Moses; Ana Alicia; Chao-Li Chi
- Theme music composer: Bill Conti
- Country of origin: United States
- Original language: English
- No. of seasons: 9
- No. of episodes: 227 (list of episodes)

Production
- Executive producers: Earl Hamner; Michael Filerman; Joanne Brough; Jeff Freilich; Camille Marchetta; Jerry Thorpe
- Producers: Malcolm R. Harding; Barry Steinberg; Robert McCullough; John F. Perry; Phil Parslow
- Running time: 45 minutes
- Production companies: Amanda & MF Productions; Lorimar Productions (1981–1986) (seasons 1–5); Lorimar-Telepictures (1986–1988) (seasons 6–7); Lorimar Television (1988–1990) (seasons 8–9)

Original release
- Network: CBS
- Release: December 4, 1981 – May 17, 1990

Falcon Crest is an American prime time television soap opera created by Earl Hamner Jr. that aired for nine seasons on CBS from December 4, 1981, to May 17, 1990. The series revolves around the feuding factions of the wealthy Gioberti/Channing family in the California wine industry set in the fictitious Tuscany Valley, located northeast of San Francisco and modeled after the real Napa Valley.

Jane Wyman stars as Angela Channing, the tyrannical matriarch of the Falcon Crest Winery, opposite Robert Foxworth as Chase Gioberti, Angela's nephew, and later David Selby as Richard Channing, the illegitimate son of Angela's ex-husband. (Note: Later revealed to be her own son, whom she was led to believe died shortly after his birth.) Other notable series regulars include Abby Dalton and Margaret Ladd as Angela's daughters Julia and Emma, Lorenzo Lamas as Angela's grandson Lance, Susan Sullivan as Chase's wife Maggie, William R. Moses as their son Cole, and Ana Alicia as heiress Melissa Agretti.

Jane Wyman won a Golden Globe Award for Best Actress for her role as Angela Channing out of two nominations. Series regular Lorenzo Lamas and guest star Gina Lollobrigida were also nominated for a Golden Globe Award for Best Supporting Actor/Actress.

== Production ==
=== Creation ===
The show was created by Earl Hamner Jr., who had previously created The Waltons. Hamner wanted to create a family drama involving the wine industry entitled The Vintage Years. He offered Wyman the lead role of Angela Channing. She said, "I told him I'd heard Barbara Stanwyck had turned it down. And he said that was an untrue rumor. It had never been offered to her." Hamner said he was looking for a "sympathetic actress" for the role. He called Wyman "one of the legendary stars ... a great actress", and insisted that though she was the ex-wife of US President Ronald Reagan who was elected as president in 1980, her casting had nothing to do with her connection to Reagan. Hamner said Wyman was chosen to add credibility to the role, and noted "The character is a harsh one. Miss Wyman's nice-lady image gives Angie more dimension and sympathy."

Hamner's concept was "the flip side of The Waltons—this family was infected by wealth, whereas poverty had threatened his Depression story [in The Waltons]". After shooting the original pilot episode of the series, called The Vintage Years in the spring of 1981, featuring Wyman in a silver wig, the actress pushed for changes in Angela. Hamner had warned Wyman that the press would call Angela a female J. R. Ewing, the amoral oil baron from Falcon Crest's lead-in series, Dallas, played by Larry Hagman. Not wanting her character to simply be a J.R. clone, Wyman said, "I feel I'm representing all women in business. I may come off as a hard, tough character, but I want Angie to show she's also capable of love."

CBS requested that Hamner make the show more like Dallas, which was the network's biggest hit at that time, and the show was retooled and the pilot reshot. The script was rewritten and several cast members changed for what became Falcon Crest. The series first aired in December 1981, when CBS scheduled Falcon Crest at 10 pm on Friday nights, right after Dallas. The Dallas-Falcon Crest double bill proved lucrative for the network and Falcon Crest was a top-20 show in the Nielsen ratings for several years. Both shows (like The Waltons) were produced for CBS by the same company, Lorimar Productions.

By 1986, each episode of the series cost around $1 million to produce.

=== Casting ===
Opposite Wyman, Robert Foxworth was cast as Chase Gioberti, Angela's nephew, and later David Selby as Richard Channing, the illegitimate son of Angela's ex-husband. Other notable series regular cast include Abby Dalton and Margaret Ladd as Angela's daughters Julia and Emma, Lorenzo Lamas as Angela's grandson Lance, Susan Sullivan as Chase's wife Maggie, William R. Moses as their son Cole, and Ana Alicia as heiress Melissa Agretti.

The series also frequently cast former Hollywood royalty in guest roles: Lana Turner, Dana Andrews, Celeste Holm, Gina Lollobrigida, Kim Novak, Cliff Robertson, Cesar Romero, and Robert Stack all appeared on Falcon Crest. This aspect to the series seemed to be well-embraced by the producers, who at one stage instituted a rotating guest-star policy. Eddie Albert, Ursula Andress, Eve Arden, Roscoe Lee Browne, Leslie Caron and Lauren Hutton all made appearances during the 1987–1988 season, as did Rod Taylor, who would remain with the series until its end in 1990. After producer Jeff Freilich left the series at the end of the 1988 season, fewer special guest stars appeared to boost ratings, one of them being Susan Blakely in the final year.

Wyman reportedly had had a long-running feud with fellow movie star legend Lana Turner, which dated back years. The two actresses supposedly refused to speak to each other and the producers had to film their confrontational scenes separately and then edit them together. Turner appeared on The Phil Donahue Show in 1982 and emphatically denied the rumors of the reported feud. "It's a bunch of bull. It's all publicity trying to drum up a feud between us. I adore Ms. Wyman. I respect her as a lady and an artist, and there is no feud." A few years after she appeared on the show, Turner stated that she believed Wyman was negative in demeanor because her ex-husband, Ronald Reagan, was elected president during the 1980s, something that Turner believed Wyman could not reconcile within herself.

In 1984, Sophia Loren was set to star in the role of Francesca Gioberti, Angela's secret half-sister, who comes to the valley to threaten Angela's control of Falcon Crest. Loren was to play 13 episodes, and producers promised a fabulous wardrobe and a dynamic character that would rival Dynasty's Alexis Carrington. At the last minute, negotiations with Loren fell through and Gina Lollobrigida (a longtime rival of Loren's) was then cast in the role, but only signed on for five episodes. Lollobrigida earned a Golden Globe nomination for her guest role. Three years earlier, Loren had also been Aaron Spelling's first choice for the role of Alexis Carrington on Dynasty, but was passed over when she demanded too much money and the role instead went to Joan Collins.

According to Dallas creator David Jacobs, before auditioning for Falcon Crest, Robert Foxworth turned down the role of J. R. Ewing on Dallas because he did not want to play such an unsympathetic character. The role ultimately went to Larry Hagman.

=== Filming and locations ===
Searching for a location to use as the principal backdrop for the show, Lorimar producers decided upon Spring Mountain Vineyard, a winery located in St. Helena, in California's Napa Valley. This site contained the 1884 Victorian mansion "Villa Miravalle", the exterior of which was used as the Falcon Crest mansion where Angela lived with her daughters and grandson, as well as the winery building which had just been constructed in the mid-1970s. As a tie-in, the Spring Mountain Winery also produced a "Falcon Crest" wine during the show's run.

=== Theme music ===
Falcon Crest's theme tune was composed by Bill Conti, who also composed the themes to Dynasty, The Colbys and Cagney & Lacey. Several variations of the main title theme were commissioned throughout the series' run. The most noticeable change to the main title theme was the version for season nine, which was done in a heavily synthetic, new-age style by musician Patrick O'Hearn. Stylistic changes were also made to the incidental music. During seasons 1 to 5, the music was performed by an orchestra in a classical style, composed mainly by Dana Kaproff and Peter Myers. Beginning midway through season 5, the background music became electronic-based and was performed by single artists using a synclavier, a high-tech programmable synthesizer; Mark Snow, who later composed the theme of The X-Files, was the main composer and performing musician from 1986 to 1988. During season 8, the music returned to a more classical style, before the composers returned to the electronic style for the final season with the score provided by new-age composer Patrick O'Hearn.

=== Pilot episode ===
A pilot episode for the series entitled The Vintage Years was filmed in the spring of 1981, but never aired. The character of Richard Channing was present in the original pilot, played by Michael Swan; this alternate Richard was Angela's biological son fighting for his domineering mother's favor. Abby Dalton's character, Julia, was called Dorcas, Jane Wyman wore a grey wig as Angela, and Chase and Maggie were played by Clu Gulager and Samantha Eggar, respectively. Emma was not seen, but a subplot concerning a mysterious woman crying for her mother while locked away in one of the upstairs rooms was seen. Lamas, Moses, and Jamie Rose appeared in the same roles, and Chao-Li Chi's character was named Lee Fong.

The pilot was written by Hamner and directed by Alexander Singer. Though never broadcast or released on DVD, it was made available for download on the AOL video-on-demand service In2TV in 2007.

== Cast and characters ==
Original cast (1981)

At the center of the action is Angela Channing (Jane Wyman), an overbearing, tyrannical matriarch who rules the Falcon Crest vineyards with an iron fist. When her brother Jason Gioberti (Harry Townes) dies from a fall in the winery, his son Chase Gioberti (Robert Foxworth) arrives to claim his inherited portion of Falcon Crest. The rivalry between Angela and Chase — whom Angela sees as an interloper — sets the tone for much of the series.

Surrounding Angela are her daughters, Julia (Abby Dalton) and Emma (Margaret Ladd), and her lazy playboy grandson, Lance Cumson (Lorenzo Lamas), who aids her in her battles against Chase. Julia is chief winemaker, though often feels oppressed by her domineering mother. Kind-natured Emma does not work in the family business, but is emotionally troubled. Julia's son Lance loves money and yearns for power, but lacks Angela's discipline and determination. Her ever-tightening grip on him eventually sends him to work for his grandfather's newspaper, The San Francisco Globe, although he soon returns to the fold. Aiding Angela in her quest for more power is her crooked lawyer, Phillip Erikson (Mel Ferrer), who would later become her second husband.

Chase's wife Maggie (Susan Sullivan) is a freelance writer who later works at The New Globe newspaper; their grown son Cole (William R. Moses) works at the winery with Chase, and daughter Vickie (Jamie Rose, later Dana Sparks) is just finishing school. Eventually realizing that she would not gain control over Chase's land anytime soon, Angela hopes to enlarge her empire by forcing Lance into an arranged marriage with Melissa Agretti (briefly played by Delores Cantú, later by Ana Alicia), heiress to the much-coveted Agretti Vineyards. Scheming Melissa becomes embroiled in a love triangle with Lance and Cole, even marrying Lance while pregnant with Cole's child.

In the second season, a true rival for Angela arrives in the form of conniving Richard Channing (David Selby), the illegitimate son of Angela's ex-husband Douglas Channing and Chase's mother. He inherits most of his father's shares in the family newspaper after Douglas dies, and uses his new wealth and power to seek retribution against both Angela and Chase for always treating him like an outcast. Richard crosses them at every turn and makes several attempts at gaining control of Falcon Crest.

== Series overview ==
=== Early seasons ===
Despite its reputation as merely being "Dallas with grapes", Falcon Crest soon found its niche among the primetime soap dramas of the 1980s, occupying the middle ground between the two genre extremes — being more glamorous than Dallas, yet not quite as outrageous as Dynasty. The distinctive location filming in the Napa Valley and the dry, wryly humorous tone of the scripts gave the series a personality of its own.

The rivalry between Angela, Chase, and Richard stayed at the core of the show for several years, as more romantic entanglements spun around them. Lance and Cole found themselves not only caught up in their family battles for control of Falcon Crest, but were also competing for Melissa's affections.

Like its counterparts, Falcon Crest employed memorable end-of-season cliffhangers to boost ratings. The 1982–83 season ended with the resolution of a murder mystery "whodunit" plot (surrounding the death of Melissa's father, Carlo Agretti) that had spanned most of the season. The killer was revealed in front of the entire cast, only to produce a handgun. Shots were fired as the camera panned away from the mansion, fading into the final scene of a rose-draped coffin being lowered into the ground, leaving the audience to wonder who had been killed.

The third-season cliffhanger in 1984 involved a plane crash involving most of the major characters, resulting in three of their deaths. A bomb explosion which ended the fourth season left Richard and Maggie in peril, and an earthquake that rippled through the valley ended the fifth season. The cliffhanger of the sixth season put Chase, Melissa, Richard, newcomer Dan Fixx and Maggie's baby in danger of drowning in the San Francisco Bay area. At the end of the seventh season, Melissa had finally wrested complete control of Falcon Crest away from Angela, while Richard was apparently murdered by "The Thirteen", a powerful group of shady businessmen whom he had turned against.

Falcon Crest was a top ten series from 1982 to 1985 (peaking at No. 7 in the 1983–84 season), airing after Dallas on Friday nights at 10:00 p.m.

=== Later seasons ===
With the departures of many of the core cast, coupled with the shifting tastes of the public in the mid-1980s, ratings began to drop (as had ratings for all of the primetime soaps of that era). By the late 1980s, U.S. ratings were dominated by sitcoms and more realistic legal/crime dramas such as L.A. Law and In the Heat of the Night. During its eighth season, Soap Opera Digest gave Falcon Crest the title of "Most Ruined Show" (that season finished 52nd in the annual ratings). The series attempted to revitalize as Knots Landing had successfully done the previous year, but by the beginning of the ninth and final season in 1989, Angela, Lance, Emma and Chao-Li were the only four characters left from the original cast. Jane Wyman was absent for most of that season due to her own health concerns; storylines had Angela attacked and fall into a coma for several months. The final season then revolved around a battle between Richard and newcomer Michael Sharpe for control of Falcon Crest.

CBS executives made the decision to end Falcon Crest when ratings during the ninth season dropped to 63rd place. Jane Wyman returned to the series for the last three episodes. The show ended happily with a family wedding taking place on the grounds of the mansion. Taking a walk outside, Angela delivered a soliloquy (written by Wyman herself) that brought the series to a conclusion, mentioning past characters and events, but looking forward to the future. The final scene of the series shows her raising her glass to the land: "A toast to you, Falcon Crest, and long may you live."

== Episodes ==
Season	Episodes	Originally released	
Season	Episodes	First released	Last released
1	18	December 4, 1981	April 16, 1982
2	22	October 1, 1982	March 11, 1983
3	28	September 30, 1983	May 18, 1984
4	30	September 28, 1984	May 24, 1985
5	29	October 4, 1985	May 22, 1986
6	28	October 3, 1986	May 15, 1987
7	28	October 2, 1987	May 6, 1988
8	22	October 28, 1988	May 19, 1989
9	22	September 29, 1989	May 17, 1990

== Reception ==
=== U.S. television ratings ===
Season	Episodes	Originally Broadcast			Nielsen Ratings		
Season	Episodes	Season premiere	Season finale	Time slot (ET)	Rank	Rating	Viewers (in millions)
1981–82	18	December 4, 1981	April 16, 1982	Friday at 10:00-11:00 PM	#13	21.4	17.4
1982–83	22	October 1, 1982	March 11, 1983	Friday at 10:00-11:00 PM	#8	20.7	17.3
1983–84	28	September 30, 1983	May 18, 1984	Friday at 10:00-11:00 PM	#7	22.0	18.4
1984–85	30	September 28, 1984	May 24, 1985	Friday at 10:00-11:00 PM	#10	19.9	17.5
1985–86	29	October 4, 1985	May 11, 1986	Friday at 10:00-11:00 PM (Episodes 1-28); Thursday at 10:00-11:00 PM (Episode 29)	#24	18.1	15.6
1986–87	28	October 3, 1986	May 15, 1987	Friday at 10:00-11:00 PM	#23	17.3	15.1
1987–88	28	October 2, 1987	May 6, 1988	Friday at 10:00-11:00 PM	#42	14.2	12.4
1988–89	22	October 28, 1988	May 19, 1989	Friday at 10:00-11:00 PM	#52	12.4	10.8
1989–90	22	September 29, 1989	May 17, 1990	Friday at 10:00-11:00 PM (Episodes 1–18); Thursday at 9:00-10:00 PM (Episodes 19–22)	#63	10.2	8.9

=== Accolades ===
==== Primetime Emmy Awards ====
Year	Category	Nominee(s)	Episode	Result	Ref.
1984	Outstanding Sound Mixing for a Drama Series	Eddie Knowles, John L. Anderson, Doug Davey, Chris Haire	"The Avenger"	Nominated	
1984	Outstanding Sound Editing for a Drama Series	Bill Wistrom, Mace Matiosian, Joanie Diener	"Ashes to Ashes"	Nominated	
1986	Outstanding Sound Mixing for a Drama Series	John Asman, Eddie Knowles, Andy MacDonald, Ken S. Polk	"The Cataclysm"	Nominated	
1989	Outstanding Music Composition for a Series	Joel Rosenbaum	"Dust to Dust"	Won	

==== Golden Globes ====
Year	Category	Nominee(s)	Result	Ref.
1982	Best Actress – Television Series Drama	Jane Wyman	Nominated	
1982	Best Supporting Actor – Series, Miniseries or Television Film	Lorenzo Lamas	Nominated	
1983	Best Actress – Television Series Drama	Jane Wyman	Won	
1984	Best Supporting Actress – Series, Miniseries or Television Film	Gina Lollobrigida	Nominated	

==== Tp de Oro ====
Year	Category	Result	Ref.
1985	Best Foreign Series	Won	
1986	Best Foreign Series	Won	
1987	Best Foreign Series	2nd Place	
1989	Best Foreign Series	Won	

== International broadcast ==
In the UK, in contrast to Dallas, Dynasty, Knots Landing and The Colbys all being broadcast on the BBC, Falcon Crest was mostly shown on ITV. Only the first fifteen episodes of Season 1 were fully networked, that is, shown at the same time across the whole of the UK. From Season 2 onwards, Falcon Crest was no longer networked nationally on ITV, so was shown across the different ITV regional channels on different days and times, sometimes months or even seasons apart in different regions. The Thames Television London ITV area moved to afternoon broadcasts midway through Season 2, although some other ITV regions carried on broadcasting the series in prime time. Seasons 3-7 were either broadcast in the afternoon, late at night, or mid-evening depending on the ITV region. ITV declined to purchase the final two seasons as the distributors only offered to sell them as a package along with other TV shows, therefore Seasons 8 and 9 were not shown on ITV in the UK, instead being broadcast on the satellite channel Sky One in the 1990s.

== Home media ==
The rights to the series are held by Warner Bros., successor-in-interest to the original production company Lorimar. The first season was released on DVD in various European countries in April and May 2009, and the second season was released from October 2009 onwards, again in various European countries.

Warner Bros. has released the first three seasons on DVD in region 1. Season one was released on April 20, 2010, season two on September 24, 2010, and season three on May 28, 2013. Seasons two and three were released by the Warner Archive Collection as Manufacture-on-Demand (MOD) releases. Season four became available digitally on iTunes in 2016.

== Adaptations ==
=== Planned revival ===
Following the relaunch of Dallas in 2012, it was reported that stars of Falcon Crest had been approached about appearing in a revival of their show. It was proposed that the series would focus on Cole Gioberti (William Moses) and Richard Channing (David Selby). However, plans for a new series never came to fruition.

=== Turkish adaptation ===
In 2018, a remake of the series was made in Turkey called Şahin Tepesi, the same name used when the original Falcon Crest aired in Turkey in the 1980s.
