= William R. Moses =

American actor (b.1959)

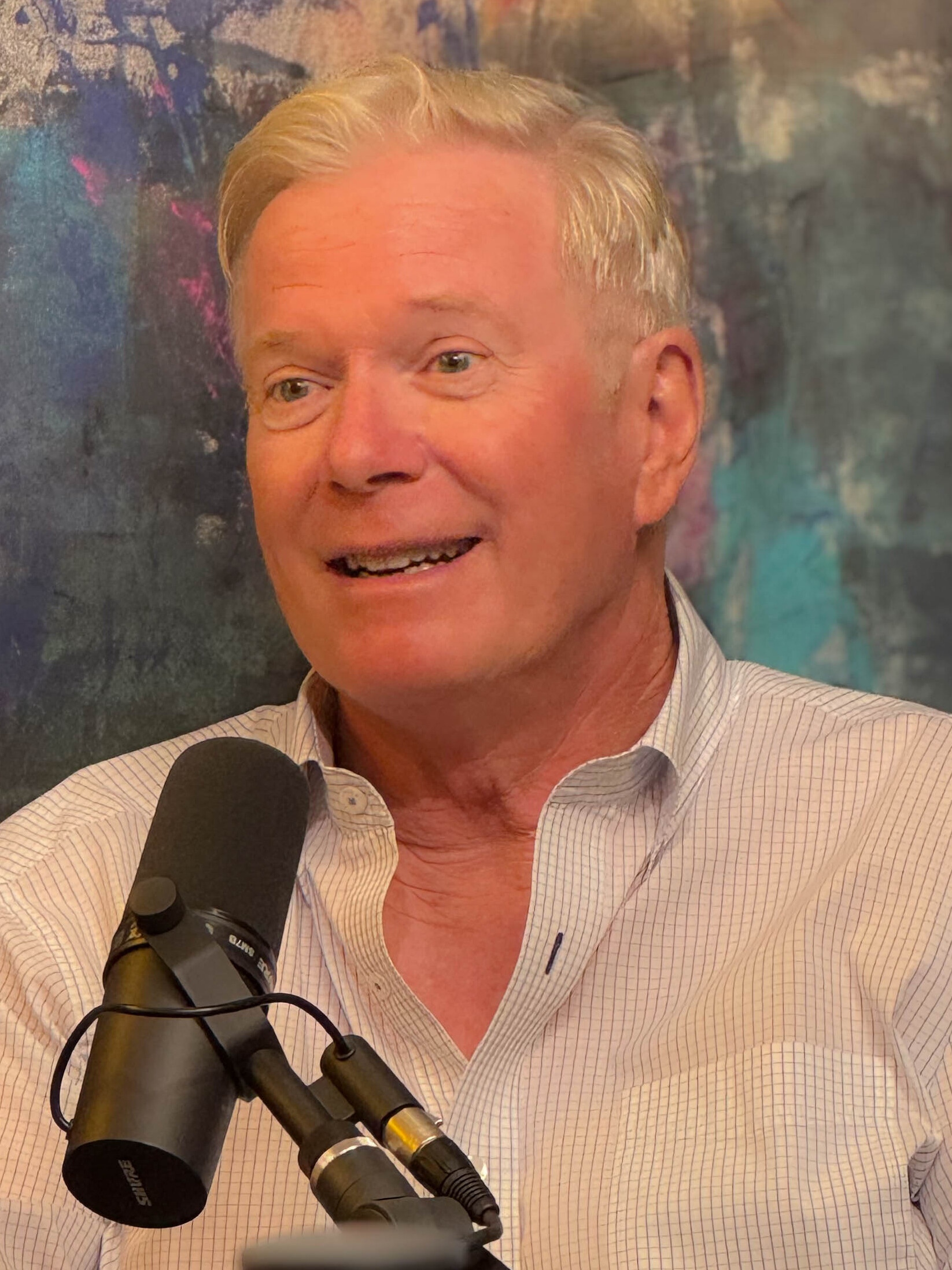
- Moses in 2025
- Born: William Remington Moses; November 17, 1959 (age 66); Los Angeles, California, U.S.
- Occupation: Actor
- Years active: 1981–present
- Spouses: Tracy Nelson (m. 1987; div. 1997); Sarah Moses (m. 2000, divorced)
- Children: 3
- Parents: Richard Cantrell Moses Sr.; Marian McCargo

William Remington Moses (born November 17, 1959) is an American actor.

== Early life ==
Moses was born in Los Angeles, the son of actress Marian McCargo (1932–2004) and advertising executive Richard Cantrell Moses Sr., who married in 1951 and divorced in 1963.

Marian remarried in 1970 to the Republican Congressman Alphonzo E. Bell Jr. (1914–2004). Congressman Bell adopted Moses and his brothers Rick and Harry. He briefly attended Wesleyan University.

== Career ==
Moses is probably best known for playing Cole Gioberti in the 1980s prime-time soap opera Falcon Crest, for six seasons from 1981–86 (although he returned for two guest appearances during the show's seventh season in 1987).

In 1988, Moses co-starred in the film Mystic Pizza with Julia Roberts. He then joined Raymond Burr in 17 Perry Mason TV movies from 1989–93, playing Ken Malansky, an attorney who worked with title character Mason as a private investigator (although in Moses' first appearance as Malansky, the character – then a law student – was defended by Mason on a murder charge). Moses continued the role in the four TV films produced after Burr's death in 1993, subtitled A Perry Mason Mystery (which aired until 1995 and starring Paul Sorvino and Hal Holbrook).

In 1992, Moses returned to soap operas, playing the recurring role of Keith Gray in 11 episodes of Melrose Place. In 1997, he played David Graysmark in the short-lived series Fame L.A.. He continued to appear in a number of films and TV movies including Double Exposure, Trial by Jury (both 1994), Hangman's Curse (2003), Christmas Child (2004), A Lover's Revenge (2005) (starring his former Perry Mason co-star Alexandra Paul), and as Jack Davis in nine of the Jane Doe series of TV films from 2005–2008. In November 2022, he was cast in the role of Jeff Webber on the ABC soap opera General Hospital.

Moses has also made guest appearances in a variety of television series throughout his career including Fantasy Island, The Love Boat, Murder, She Wrote, CSI:Miami and Homeland and Major Crimes, among others.

== Personal life ==
Moses was married to actress Tracy Nelson, with whom he has a daughter, from 1987 to 1997. Remington Elizabeth Moses, born in 1992, is an actress. In 2000, Moses married Sarah Moses.

== Filmography ==
=== Feature films ===
Year	Title	Role	Notes
1981	Choices	Pat	Film debut
1988	Alien from L.A.	Guten "Gus" Edway	
1988	Mystic Pizza	Tim Travers	
1994	Fun	John	
1994	Almost Dead	Jim Schneider	
1994	Double Exposure	Det. Joiner	
1994	Trial by Jury	Paul Baker, Juror	
1997	The Nurse	Michael	
1997	The Price of Kissing	Miles	
1997	Man of Her Dreams	Walter Uren	Alternate title: The Fiance
1998	Wicked	Ben Christianson	
2000	The Cactus Kid	Jack	
2000	25 Degrees In July	Jed Colburn	
2001	Alone with a Stranger	James/Max	
2001	The Painting	Martin Shaughnessy	Alternate title: Soldiers of Change
2003	Hangman's Curse	Coach Marquardt	
2004	Christmas Child	Jack Davenport	
2005	The Derby Stallion	Jim McCardle	
2009	Accused at 17	Michael Werner	
2013	Assumed Killer	Dr. Green	Alternative title: Assumed Memories
2016	Oloibiri	Powell	
2018	Canal Street	Bill Sudermill	
2019	The Illegal	Professor McGorry	

=== Television films ===
Year	Title	Role	Notes
1989	The Case of the Lethal Lesson	Ken Malansky	Perry Mason
1989	The Case of the Musical Murder	Ken Malansky	Perry Mason
1989	The Case of the All-Star Assassin	Ken Malansky	Perry Mason
1990	Rock Hudson	Marc Christian	
1990	The Case of the Poisoned Pen	Ken Malansky	Perry Mason
1990	The Case of the Desperate Deception	Ken Malansky	Perry Mason
1990	The Case of the Silenced Singer	Ken Malansky	Perry Mason
1990	The Case of the Defiant Daughter	Ken Malansky	Perry Mason
1991	The Case of the Ruthless Reporter	Ken Malansky	Perry Mason
1991	The Case of the Maligned Mobster	Ken Malansky	Perry Mason
1991	The Case of the Glass Coffin	Ken Malansky	Perry Mason
1991	The Case of the Fatal Fashion	Ken Malansky	Perry Mason
1992	The Case of the Fatal Framing	Ken Malansky	Perry Mason
1992	The Case of the Reckless Romeo	Ken Malansky	Perry Mason
1992	The Case of the Heartbroken Bride	Ken Malansky	Perry Mason
1993	The Case of the Skin-Deep Scandal	Ken Malansky	Perry Mason
1993	The Case of the Telltale Talk Show Host	Ken Malansky	Perry Mason
1993	The Case of the Killer Kiss	Ken Malansky	Perry Mason
1993	The Case of the Wicked Wives	Ken Malansky	A Perry Mason Mystery
1994	The Case of the Lethal Lifestyle	Ken Malansky	A Perry Mason Mystery
1994	The Haunting of Seacliff Inn	Mark Enright	
1994	The Case of the Grimacing Governor	Ken Malansky	A Perry Mason Mystery
1995	The Case of the Jealous Jokester	Ken Malansky	A Perry Mason Mystery
1995	Circumstances Unknown	Tim Reushel	
1996	Evil Has a Face	Tom	
1996	She Woke Up Pregnant	Tom Loftis	
1996	The Cold Equations	Adrian Cross	
1996	To Love, Honor and Deceive	Nicholas Bennett	
1998	Emma's Wish	Bryan Bookman	
1999	Vanished Without a Trace	Jack Porterson	
2000	Chain of Command	Agent Gary Philips	
2000	Stolen from the Heart	Cody Ravetch	
2000	Missing Pieces	David	
2001	The Perfect Wife	Dr. Brad Steward	
2001	A Mother's Testimony	Ian Matthews	
2001	Living in Fear	Chuck Hausman	
2002	Her Best Friend's Husband	Will Roberts	
2003	Mystery Woman	Lt. Robert Hawke	
2005	Vanishing Act	Jack Davis	Jane Doe
2005	Now You See It, Now You Don't	Jack Davis	Jane Doe
2005	Til Death Do Us Part	Jack Davis	Jane Doe
2005	The Wrong Face	Jack Davis	Jane Doe
2005	A Lover's Revenge	Kyle Lundstrom/James Stratton	
2006	Yes, I Remember It Well	Jack Davis	Jane Doe
2006	The Harder They Fall	Jack Davis	Jane Doe
2006	The Perfect Marriage	Richard Danforth	
2007	Like Mother, Like Daughter	John Collins	
2007	Ties That Bind	Jack Davis	Jane Doe
2007	How to Fire Your Boss	Jack Davis	Jane Doe
2007	The Sitter	Carter Eastman	Alternative title: While the Children Sleep
2008	Eye of the Beholder	Jack Davis	Jane Doe
2011	Dark Secrets	Richard Dunnfield	
2011	We Have Your Husband	Cal Wimberly	
2012	Operation Cupcake	Gen. Brown	
2014	Killing Daddy	George Ross	
2018	Love at Sea	Wes Jameson	
2023	Mystic Christmas	Ken	Television film (Hallmark)

=== Television series ===
Year	Title	Role	Notes
1981–87	Falcon Crest	Cole Gioberti	140 episodes
1982	Fantasy Island	Tommy Rudolph	Episode: "The Final Round"
1983–86	The Love Boat	Deek Oliver/Jack/Mark Davis	Episodes: "Poor Little Rich Man" (Parts 1 & 2); "Revenge with the Proper Stranger"; "Spain Cruise" (Parts 1 & 2)
1984	Finder of Lost Loves	Peter Harding	Episode: "Maxwell Ltd: Finder of Lost Loves Pilot"
1984	Glitter	Hayden	Episode: "Illusions"
1987	Hotel	Tony Milner	Episode: "Fast Forward"
1988	Murder, She Wrote	Reese Morgan	Episode: "Coal Miner's Slaughter"
1988–89	War and Remembrance	Simon Anderson	Miniseries
1989	Father Dowling Mysteries	Jack	Episode: "The Man Who Came to Dinner Mystery"
1992–93	Melrose Place	Keith Gray	11 episodes
1995–2003	Touched by an Angel	Charlie/Pepper Kellerman	Episodes: "The Feather"; "A Time for Every Purpose"
1995	The Great Defender	Merritt	Episode: "Camille"
1995	Hope and Gloria	Jeffrey	Episode: "An Embarrassment of Teapots"
1995	Flipper	Tyrell Parsons	Episode: "Kidnapped" (Parts 1 & 2)
1997–98	Fame L.A.	David Graysmark	22 episodes
1999–2002	JAG	Agent Paul Candella/Cmdr. Dorning	Episodes: "Webb of Lies"; "Need to Know"
1999	L.A. Doctors	Phillip Gant	Episode: "Que Sera, Sarah"
2001	Ally McBeal	Kenneth Thompson	Episode: "The Pursuit of Unhappiness"
2002–2005	Crossing Jordan	Attorney/Terrance Duvall	Episodes: "Payback"; "Jumo, Push, Fall"
2003	7th Heaven	Dick	Episodes: "That Touch of Blink"; "Dick"
2003	NCIS	Agent Kent Fuller	Episode: "Seadog"
2004	Tru Calling	Julian Barnes	Episode: "Drop Dead Gorgeous"
2005	Cold Case	Daniel Potter	Episode: "Honor"
2007	CSI: Miami	Dennis Lambert	Episode: "CSI: My Nanny"
2008	Ghost Whisperer	Cliff Sturges	Episode: "Save Our Souls"
2008	Bones	Arthur Bilbrey	Episode: "The Passenger in the Oven"
2008	Without a Trace	Dale Harmon	Episode: "Cloudy with a Chance of Gettysburg"
2010–12	The Secret Life of the American Teenager	Morgan	8 episodes
2010	The Forgotten	Sam Denver	Episode: "My John"
2010	Big Love	LDS Bishop	Episode: "Under One Roof"
2010	Castle	Blake Wilder	Episode: "Overkill"
2010	The Glades	Prof. Landers	Episode: "The Girlfriend Experience"
2010	CSI: Crime Scene Investigation	Phil Kohner	Episode: "Cold Blooded"
2012	The Mentalist	Archie Bloom Sr.	Episode: "Ruby Slippers"
2012	Major Crimes	Will Reichman	Episode: "Dismissed with Prejudice"
2013	King & Maxwell	Congressman Oliver Dawson	Episode: "Wild Card"
2014	Mind Games	Bertram Hood	Episode: "Cauliflower Man"
2015	Mad Men	Bruce MacDonald	Episode: "Time & Life"
2015	Homeland	Scott	Episode: "Super Powers"
2016	Grey's Anatomy	Steven	Episode: "I am Not Waiting Anymore"
2016	American Horror Story	Frank	Episode: "Chapter 6"
2017	Chicago Med	Sean Adams	Episode: "Lesson Learned"
2017	Doubt	Rev. Muller	Episode: "Faith"
2018	The 5th Quarter	Hal Faber	Episode: "Procussion"
2018	The Good Doctor	Barry Newton	Episode: "Pain"
2019	How to Get Away with Murder	Special Agent Lanford	Episodes: "Be the Martyr"; "Where Are Your Parents?"; "Please Say No One Else Is Dead"
2022	General Hospital	Jeff Webber	Recurring role
