= Ana Alicia =

Mexican-American actress (1956)

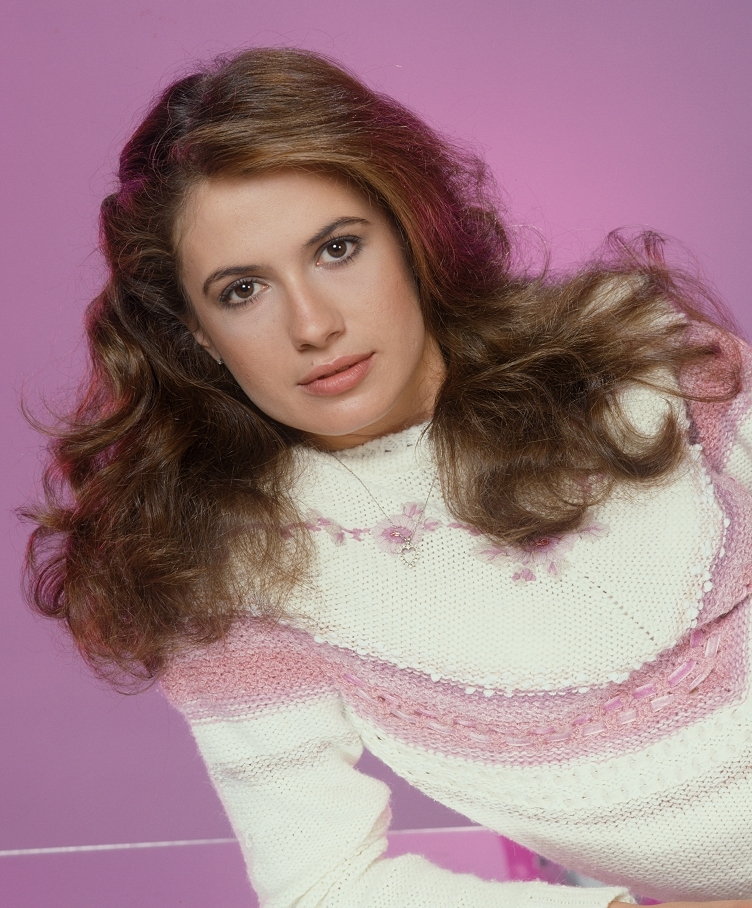
- Alicia in the 1980s
- Born: Ana Alicia Ortiz Torres; December 12, 1956 (age 69); Mexico City, Mexico
- Education: Wellesley College; University of Texas at El Paso; Southwestern Law School
- Occupations: Actress, singer, producer
- Years active: 1973–2015
- Known for: Halloween II; Ryan's Hope; Falcon Crest; Battlestar Galactica
- Spouse: Gary R. Benz (m. 1994; div. 2016)
- Children: 2

Ana Alicia Ortiz Torres (born December 12, 1956) is a Mexican-American retired actress who performed in theatre and on television. After getting her television start by spending a year on the daytime soap-opera Ryan's Hope, she gained international recognition for her role as scheming vineyard heiress Melissa Agretti on the long-running primetime soap opera Falcon Crest which she portrayed for seven seasons from 1982 until 1988. She has also performed in few single episode guest-starring roles on various televisions shows or in television movies most years from the late-1970s to the mid-1990s.

== Early life ==
Ana Alicia Ortiz Torres was born in Mexico City to Alicia Torres and Carlos Celestino Ortiz, who ran businesses in Acapulco, Mexico. She was the third of four children. Her family moved to El Paso, Texas, when she was six years old after her father's death, and she lived with her mother, three siblings, grandmother, and uncle in a house that her father had purchased for her grandmother. Upon graduating from high school in 1972, Ortiz earned a scholarship to Wellesley College. Upon arrival at Wellesley College, Ortiz auditioned and won the lead role for Jules Feiffer's Crawling Arnold.

On summer break after her freshman year, Ortiz auditioned for The Adobe Horseshoe Dinner Theatre outside El Paso, Texas. The theatre offered her a position as a recurring actress in all feature productions. The opportunity would allow her to work with name actors from Hollywood and New York and receive a large weekly salary. She accepted the offer and also acquired her actor's equity card through her term. She left Wellesley College, instead pursuing her bachelor's degree in drama at the University of Texas at El Paso to be closer to her mother and three brothers.

Her first professional role under an AEA contract was as one of the Pigeon Sisters in a production of The Odd Couple starring Bob Denver at The Adobe Horseshoe Dinner Theater in El Paso.

== Career ==
After earning her degree in 1977, Ortiz moved to Los Angeles and started auditioning for roles in various productions. She won the part of Alicia Nieves on Ryan's Hope, a daytime soap opera, moving to New York City for taping. After fifteen months on the show, Ortiz moved back to Los Angeles part-time and kept auditioning while attending law school at Southwestern Law School at night back in Texas. Eventually, her acting opportunities suffered and she decided to pursue acting full-time.

Now going by "Ana Alicia" professionally, she landed several guest roles in episodic television, including Starbuck's love interest, Aurora, in the 1979 Battlestar Galactica episode "Take the Celestra" and Gloria Alonzo in the episode "Space Croppers" of the series sequel Galactica 1980. Between these she appeared as Falina Redding in the Buck Rogers in the 25th Century episode "Vegas in Space." In 1979 Ana Alicia appeared in the made-for-TV movie The Sacketts as Drusilla, the love of Tyrell Sackett. The movie was based on the Louis L'Amour books The Sacketts and The Daybreakers. She played a major role in the 1981 TV movie Coward of the County, which also starred Kenny Rogers, and was based on his hit song of the same name. In 1982, she was cast in the role of spoiled, selfish vineyard heiress Melissa Agretti on Falcon Crest as a replacement for actress Delores Cantú who had played Melissa for one episode in early 1982. Ana Alicia appeared in the 1983 TV-movie, Happy Endings, opposite John Schneider and her former Ryan's Hope co-star, Catherine Hicks.

In 1989, Ortiz appeared with Raúl Juliá in the movie Romero, her only non-television film role, apart from Halloween II in 1981. Then in 1990, Ana Alicia appeared in the 1990 made-for-TV movie Miracle Landing as flight attendant Michelle Honda. The film is based on an in-flight accident aboard Aloha Airlines Flight 243 that occurred in April 1988. Ana Alicia continued to play guest roles on episodic television, including two episodes in the action series Renegade which reunited her with her former Falcon Crest screen husband Lorenzo Lamas.

Alicia sang two songs on the soap, Falcon Crest. The first song was "Goody Goody", a famous 1936 song composed by Matty Malneck with lyrics by Johnny Mercer. The song was first sung by Bing Crosby. The second song was "Body and Soul". It was written by Edward Heyman, Robert Sour, Frank Eyton and Johnny Green in 1930. The song was presented by Libby Holman in the revue Three's a Crowd and used as the theme of the 1947 film, Body and Soul, becoming a jazz favorite.

In October 2010, Ana Alicia appeared in a promotional video for the Norwegian television show Gylne Tider. She and other celebrities filmed a cover of The Beatles song "Let It Be".

Ana Alicia was the national spokesperson for The Humane Society of the United States. She has given out awards promoting Hispanic accomplishments in the media from the Golden Eagle Awards.

== Family ==
Alicia married producer and entrepreneur Gary R. Benz on April 24, 1994; they divorced in 2016.

== Filmography ==
Film
| Year | Title | Role | Notes |
|---|---|---|---|
| 1981 | Halloween II | Janet Marshall | |
| 1989 | Romero | Arista Zelada | |
| 1991 | Flamenco - un voyage andalou | Herself | Documentary |
| 1994 | To Die, to Sleep | Kathy's Mother | Voice |
| 2012 | The Nightmare Isn't Over: The Making of Halloween II | Herself | Documentary |

Television
| Year | Title | Role | Notes |
|---|---|---|---|
| 1977–1978 | Ryan's Hope | Alicia Nieves | |
| 1978 | The Next Step Beyond | Angela Mendoza | Episode "Portrait of the Mind: (1.9) |
| 1979 | The Hardy Boys | Suzanne Clifford | Episode "Life on the Line" (3.10) |
| 1979 | Battlestar Galactica | Aurora | Episode "Take the Celestra" (1.20) |
| 1979 | The Sacketts (TV movie) | Drusilla | |
| 1979 | Buck Rogers in the 25th Century | Falina Redding | Episode "Vegas in Space" (1.3) |
| 1979 | The Misadventures of Sheriff Lobo | Millie Rogers | Episode "The Boom Boom Lady" (1.9) |
| 1980 | Galactica 1980 | Gloria Alonzo | Episode "Space Croppers" (1.9) |
| 1980 | Quincy, M.E. | Nurse Nancy Berger | Episode "No Way to Treat a Patient" (5.22) |
| 1980 | Roughnecks (TV movie) | Yolanda Suarez | |
| 1980 | Condominium (TV movie) | Thelma Messenkott | |
| 1981 | B. J. and the Bear | Dolores | Episode "Seven Lady Captives" (3.11) |
| 1981 | Coward of the County (TV movie) | Violet | |
| 1981 | The Ordeal of Bill Carney (TV movie) | Lisa Saldonna | |
| 1982 | McClain's Law | | Episode "A Matter of Honor" (1.8) |
| 1982 | Tattletales | Herself | 5 Episodes |
| 1982–1988 | Falcon Crest | Melissa Agretti Cumson Gioberti | 173 Episodes |
| 1983 | Happy Endings (TV movie) | Veronica | |
| 1983 | Battle of the Network Stars XV | Herself - CBS Team | |
| 1984 | Hollywood '84 (TV miniseries) | Herself | Episode (1.2) |
| 1984 | The Love Boat | Samantha Gregory | Episode " My Mother, My Chaperone/Present, The/Death and Life of Sir Alfred Demerest, The/Welcome Aboard: Part 1: (8.11) |
| 1984 | The Love Boat | Samantha Gregory | Episode "My Mother, My Chaperone/Present, The/Death and Life of Sir Alfred Demerest, The/Welcome Aboard: Part 2" (8.12) |
| 1985 | Hotel | Mary Ellen Carson | Episode "Bystanders" (2.17) |
| 1986 | The CBS Easter Parade (TV special) | Herself - Host | |
| 1987 | Sex Symbols: Past, Present and Future (TV movie) | Herself | |
| 1988 | Moonlighting | Mary Erin-Gates | Episode "And the Flesh Was Made Word" (4.14) (as Ana-Alicia) |
| 1989 | Falcon Crest | Samantha Ross | 5 Episodes |
| 1990 | Miracle Landing (TV movie) | Michelle Honda | (as Ana-Alicia) |
| 1991 | Life Goes On | Shanna Grey | Episode "Lighter Than Air" (2.21) |
| 1993 | Rio Shannon (TV movie) | Dolores Santillan | |
| 1994 | Murder, She Wrote | Sgt. Hilda Dupont | Episode "Northern Explosion" (10.11) |
| 1994 | Acapulco H.E.A.T. | Linda Davidson | Episode "Code Name: Easy Riders" (1.12) |
| 1994 | Renegade | Dr. Grace Prescott | Episode "Sheriff Reno" (2.19) (as Ana-Alicia) |
| 1996 | Renegade | Angela Baptista | Episode "Hard Evidence" (4.19) (as Ana-Alicia) |
| 1997 | Happily Ever After: Fairy Tales for Every Child | Duchess of Earl / Businessman's Daughter | Episode "The Pied Piper" (5.2) (Voice) |
| 2004 | E! True Hollywood Story | Herself | Episode "Scream Queens" |
| 2015 | Frontera Roja | Soila | Episode "Reencuentros" (1.1) |

== Music ==
Singing
| Year | Title | Song | Notes |
|---|---|---|---|
| 1985 | Falcon Crest (TV series) | "Mairzy Doates" | Episode "Cold Comfort" (4.23) |
| 1987 | Falcon Crest (TV series) | "Goody Goody" | Episode "Cold Hands" (6.23) |
| 1987 | Falcon Crest (TV series) | "Body and Soul" | Episode "Body and Soul" (6.24) |
| 1987 | Falcon Crest (TV series) | "Body and Soul", "Goody Goody" | Episode "Loose Cannons" (6.25) |

== Theatre ==
| Year | Title | Role | Notes |
|---|---|---|---|
| 1973 | "The Odd Couple" | Pigeon Sister | Adobe Horseshoe Dinner Theater |
| | "Busybody" | | Adobe Horseshoe Dinner Theater |
| | "Boeing, Boeing" | | Adobe horseshoe Dinner Theater |

== Awards and nominations ==
Awards
| Year | Award | Category | Production | Result |
|---|---|---|---|---|
| 1986 | Soap Opera Digest Awards | Outstanding Actress in a Leading Role on a Prime Time Serial | Falcon Crest | Nominated |
| 1988 | Soap Opera Digest Awards | Outstanding Actress in a Leading Role: Prime Time | Falcon Crest | Nominated |
| 1989 | Soap Opera Digest Awards | Outstanding Villainess: Prime Time | Falcon Crest | Nominated |
| 1990 | Soap Opera Digest Awards | Outstanding Supporting Actress: Prime Time | Falcon Crest | Nominated |
