= List of Dark Shadows episodes =

Dark Shadows is an American Gothic soap opera that originally aired weekdays on the ABC television network, from June 27, 1966, to April 2, 1971. A total of 1,225 actual episodes were produced, but during the course of its run the show was pre-empted 20 times. ABC would compensate for this by double numbering episodes on 16 different occasions, and triple numbering episodes on two other occasions, in order to keep a show ending in a 5 or 0 airing on Fridays. This is why the last episode produced is episode 1,245, when in actuality it was only the #1,225th episode actually produced. The table below is a complete list of all episodes. Along with production information, it also includes a list of the DVD releases in volume format.

== 1966 ==
#	Episode	Writer	Director	Narrator	Tape date	Original airdate	DVD volume
1	"1"	Art Wallace	Lela Swift	Alexandra Moltke (as Victoria Winters)	June 13, 1966	June 27, 1966	BEG1
2	"2"	Art Wallace	Lela Swift	Alexandra Moltke (as Victoria Winters)	June 14, 1966	June 28, 1966	BEG1
3	"3"	Art Wallace	Lela Swift	Alexandra Moltke (as Victoria Winters)	June 15, 1966	June 29, 1966	BEG1
4	"4"	Art Wallace	Lela Swift	Alexandra Moltke (as Victoria Winters)	June 16, 1966	June 30, 1966	BEG1
5	"5"	Art Wallace	Lela Swift	Alexandra Moltke (as Victoria Winters)	June 17, 1966	July 1, 1966	BEG1
6	"6"	Art Wallace	Lela Swift	Alexandra Moltke (as Victoria Winters)	June 20, 1966	July 4, 1966	BEG1
7	"7"	Art Wallace	Lela Swift	Alexandra Moltke (as Victoria Winters)	June 21, 1966	July 5, 1966	BEG1
8	"8"	Art Wallace	Lela Swift	Alexandra Moltke (as Victoria Winters)	June 22, 1966	July 6, 1966	BEG1
9	"9"	Art Wallace	Lela Swift	Alexandra Moltke (as Victoria Winters)	June 23, 1966	July 7, 1966	BEG1
10	"10"	Art Wallace	Lela Swift	Alexandra Moltke (as Victoria Winters)	June 24, 1966	July 8, 1966	BEG1
11	"11"	Art Wallace	Lela Swift	Alexandra Moltke (as Victoria Winters)	June 27, 1966	July 11, 1966	BEG1
12	"12"	Art Wallace	Lela Swift	Alexandra Moltke (as Victoria Winters)	June 28, 1966	July 12, 1966	BEG1
13	"13"	Art Wallace	Lela Swift	Alexandra Moltke (as Victoria Winters)	June 29, 1966	July 13, 1966	BEG1
14	"14"	Art Wallace	Lela Swift	Alexandra Moltke (as Victoria Winters)	June 30, 1966	July 14, 1966	BEG1
15	"15"	Art Wallace	Lela Swift	Alexandra Moltke (as Victoria Winters)	July 1, 1966	July 15, 1966	BEG1
16	"16"	Art Wallace	Lela Swift	Alexandra Moltke (as Victoria Winters)	July 4, 1966	July 18, 1966	BEG1
17	"17"	Art Wallace	Lela Swift	Alexandra Moltke (as Victoria Winters)	July 5, 1966	July 19, 1966	BEG1
18	"18"	Art Wallace	Lela Swift	Alexandra Moltke (as Victoria Winters)	July 6, 1966	July 20, 1966	BEG1
19	"19"	Art Wallace	Lela Swift	Alexandra Moltke (as Victoria Winters)	July 7, 1966	July 21, 1966	BEG1
20	"20"	Art Wallace	Lela Swift	Alexandra Moltke (as Victoria Winters)	July 8, 1966	July 22, 1966	BEG1
21	"21"	Art Wallace	John Sedwick	Alexandra Moltke (as Victoria Winters)	July 11, 1966	July 25, 1966	BEG1
22	"22"	Art Wallace	John Sedwick	Alexandra Moltke (as Victoria Winters)	July 12, 1966	July 26, 1966	BEG1
23	"23"	Art Wallace	John Sedwick	Alexandra Moltke (as Victoria Winters)	July 13, 1966	July 27, 1966	BEG1
24	"24"	Art Wallace	John Sedwick	Alexandra Moltke (as Victoria Winters)	July 14, 1966	July 28, 1966	BEG1
25	"25"	Art Wallace	Lela Swift	Alexandra Moltke (as Victoria Winters)	July 15, 1966	July 29, 1966	BEG1
26	"26"	Art Wallace	Lela Swift	Alexandra Moltke (as Victoria Winters)	July 18, 1966	August 1, 1966	BEG1
27	"27"	Art Wallace	Lela Swift	Alexandra Moltke (as Victoria Winters)	July 19, 1966	August 2, 1966	BEG1
28	"28"	Art Wallace	Lela Swift	Alexandra Moltke (as Victoria Winters)	July 20, 1966	August 3, 1966	BEG1
29	"29"	Art Wallace	John Sedwick	Alexandra Moltke (as Victoria Winters)	July 21, 1966	August 4, 1966	BEG1
30	"30"	Art Wallace	John Sedwick	Alexandra Moltke (as Victoria Winters)	July 22, 1966	August 5, 1966	BEG1
31	"31"	Art Wallace	John Sedwick	Alexandra Moltke (as Victoria Winters)	July 25, 1966	August 8, 1966	BEG1
32	"32"	Art Wallace	John Sedwick	Alexandra Moltke (as Victoria Winters)	July 26, 1966	August 9, 1966	BEG1
33	"33"	Art Wallace	John Sedwick	Alexandra Moltke (as Victoria Winters)	July 27, 1966	August 10, 1966	BEG1
34	"34"	Art Wallace	Lela Swift	Alexandra Moltke (as Victoria Winters)	July 28, 1966	August 11, 1966	BEG1
35	"35"	Art Wallace	Lela Swift	Alexandra Moltke (as Victoria Winters)	July 29, 1966	August 12, 1966	BEG1
36	"36"	Art Wallace	Lela Swift	Alexandra Moltke (as Victoria Winters)	August 1, 1966	August 15, 1966	BEG2
37	"37"	Art Wallace	Lela Swift	Alexandra Moltke (as Victoria Winters)	August 3, 1966	August 16, 1966	BEG2
38	"38"	Art Wallace	Lela Swift	Alexandra Moltke (as Victoria Winters)	August 2, 1966	August 17, 1966	BEG2
39	"39"	Art Wallace	John Sedwick	Alexandra Moltke (as Victoria Winters)	August 4, 1966	August 18, 1966	BEG2
40	"40"	Art Wallace	John Sedwick	Alexandra Moltke (as Victoria Winters)	August 5, 1966	August 19, 1966	BEG2
41	"41"	Francis Swann	John Sedwick	Alexandra Moltke (as Victoria Winters)	August 8, 1966	August 22, 1966	BEG2
42	"42"	Francis Swann	John Sedwick	Alexandra Moltke (as Victoria Winters)	August 9, 1966	August 23, 1966	BEG2
43	"43"	Francis Swann	John Sedwick	Alexandra Moltke (as Victoria Winters)	August 10, 1966	August 24, 1966	BEG2
44	"44"	Francis Swann	Lela Swift	Alexandra Moltke (as Victoria Winters)	August 11, 1966	August 25, 1966	BEG2
45	"45"	Francis Swann	Lela Swift	Alexandra Moltke (as Victoria Winters)	August 12, 1966	August 26, 1966	BEG2
46	"46"	Art Wallace	Lela Swift	Alexandra Moltke (as Victoria Winters)	August 15, 1966	August 29, 1966	BEG2
47	"47"	Art Wallace	Lela Swift	Alexandra Moltke (as Victoria Winters)	August 16, 1966	August 30, 1966	BEG2
48	"48"	Art Wallace	Lela Swift	Alexandra Moltke (as Victoria Winters)	August 17, 1966	August 31, 1966	BEG2
49	"49"	Art Wallace	John Sedwick	Alexandra Moltke (as Victoria Winters)	August 18, 1966	September 1, 1966	BEG2
50	"50"	Art Wallace	John Sedwick	Alexandra Moltke (as Victoria Winters)	August 19, 1966	September 2, 1966	BEG2
51	"51"	Francis Swann	John Sedwick	Alexandra Moltke (as Victoria Winters)	August 22, 1966	September 5, 1966	BEG2
52	"52"	Francis Swann	John Sedwick	Alexandra Moltke (as Victoria Winters)	August 23, 1966	September 6, 1966	BEG2
53	"53"	Francis Swann	John Sedwick	Alexandra Moltke (as Victoria Winters)	August 24, 1966	September 7, 1966	BEG2
54	"54"	Francis Swann	Lela Swift	Alexandra Moltke (as Victoria Winters)	August 25, 1966	September 8, 1966	BEG2
55	"55"	Francis Swann	Lela Swift	Alexandra Moltke (as Victoria Winters)	August 26, 1966	September 9, 1966	BEG2
56	"56"	Art Wallace	Lela Swift	Alexandra Moltke (as Victoria Winters)	September 5, 1966	September 12, 1966	BEG2
57	"57"	Art Wallace	Lela Swift	Alexandra Moltke (as Victoria Winters)	September 6, 1966	September 13, 1966	BEG2
58	"58"	Art Wallace	Lela Swift	Alexandra Moltke (as Victoria Winters)	September 7, 1966	September 14, 1966	BEG2
59	"59"	Art Wallace	John Sedwick	Alexandra Moltke (as Victoria Winters)	September 8, 1966	September 15, 1966	BEG2
60	"60"	Art Wallace	John Sedwick	Alexandra Moltke (as Victoria Winters)	September 9, 1966	September 16, 1966	BEG2
61	"61"	Art Wallace	John Sedwick	Alexandra Moltke (as Victoria Winters)	September 12, 1966	September 19, 1966	BEG2
62	"62"	Art Wallace	John Sedwick	Alexandra Moltke (as Victoria Winters)	September 13, 1966	September 20, 1966	BEG2
63	"63"	Art Wallace	John Sedwick	Alexandra Moltke (as Victoria Winters)	September 14, 1966	September 21, 1966	BEG2
64	"64"	Art Wallace	John Sedwick	Alexandra Moltke (as Victoria Winters)	September 15, 1966	September 22, 1966	BEG2
65	"65"	Art Wallace	John Sedwick	Alexandra Moltke (as Victoria Winters)	September 16, 1966	September 23, 1966	BEG2
66	"66"	Francis Swann	Lela Swift	Alexandra Moltke (as Victoria Winters)	September 19, 1966	September 26, 1966	BEG2
67	"67"	Francis Swann	Lela Swift	Alexandra Moltke (as Victoria Winters)	September 25, 1966	September 27, 1966	BEG2
68	"68"	Francis Swann	Lela Swift	Alexandra Moltke (as Victoria Winters)	September 21, 1966	September 28, 1966	BEG2
69	"69"	Francis Swann	Lela Swift	Alexandra Moltke (as Victoria Winters)	September 22, 1966	September 29, 1966	BEG2
70	"70"	Art Wallace	Lela Swift	Alexandra Moltke (as Victoria Winters)	September 23, 1966	September 30, 1966	BEG2
71	"71"	Art Wallace	John Sedwick	Alexandra Moltke (as Victoria Winters)	September 26, 1966	October 3, 1966	BEG3
72	"72"	Art Wallace	John Sedwick	Alexandra Moltke (as Victoria Winters)	September 27, 1966	October 4, 1966	BEG3
73	"73"	Art Wallace	John Sedwick	Alexandra Moltke (as Victoria Winters)	September 28, 1966	October 5, 1966	BEG3
74	"74"	Art Wallace	John Sedwick	Alexandra Moltke (as Victoria Winters)	September 29, 1966	October 6, 1966	BEG3
75	"75"	Art Wallace	John Sedwick	Alexandra Moltke (as Victoria Winters)	September 30, 1966	October 7, 1966	BEG3
76	"76"	Francis Swann	Lela Swift	Alexandra Moltke (as Victoria Winters)	October 3, 1966	October 10, 1966	BEG3
77	"77"	Francis Swann	Lela Swift	Alexandra Moltke (as Victoria Winters)	October 4, 1966	October 11, 1966	BEG3
78	"78"	Francis Swann	Lela Swift	Alexandra Moltke (as Victoria Winters)	October 5, 1966	October 12, 1966	BEG3
79	"79"	Francis Swann	Lela Swift	Alexandra Moltke (as Victoria Winters)	October 6, 1966	October 13, 1966	BEG3
80	"80"	Francis Swann	Lela Swift	Alexandra Moltke (as Victoria Winters)	October 7, 1966	October 14, 1966	BEG3
81	"81"	Art Wallace	John Sedwick	Alexandra Moltke (as Victoria Winters)	October 9, 1966	October 17, 1966	BEG3
82	"82"	Art Wallace	John Sedwick	Alexandra Moltke (as Victoria Winters)	October 10, 1966	October 18, 1966	BEG3
83	"83"	Art Wallace	John Sedwick	Alexandra Moltke (as Victoria Winters)	October 11, 1966	October 19, 1966	BEG3
84	"84"	Art Wallace	John Sedwick	Alexandra Moltke (as Victoria Winters)	October 12, 1966	October 20, 1966	BEG3
85	"85"	Art Wallace	John Sedwick	Alexandra Moltke (as Victoria Winters)	October 13, 1966	October 21, 1966	BEG3
86	"86"	Francis Swann	Lela Swift	Alexandra Moltke (as Victoria Winters)	October 14, 1966	October 24, 1966	BEG3
87	"87"	Francis Swann	Lela Swift	Alexandra Moltke (as Victoria Winters)	October 16, 1966	October 25, 1966	BEG3
88	"88"	Francis Swann	Lela Swift	Alexandra Moltke (as Victoria Winters)	October 17, 1966	October 26, 1966	BEG3
89	"89"	Francis Swann	Lela Swift	Alexandra Moltke (as Victoria Winters)	October 18, 1966	October 27, 1966	BEG3
90	"90"	Francis Swann	Lela Swift	Alexandra Moltke (as Victoria Winters)	October 19, 1966	October 28, 1966	BEG3
91	"91"	Francis Swann	John Sedwick	Alexandra Moltke (as Victoria Winters)	October 20, 1966	October 31, 1966	BEG3
92	"92"	Francis Swann	John Sedwick	Alexandra Moltke (as Victoria Winters)	October 21, 1966	November 1, 1966	BEG3
93	"93"	Francis Swann	John Sedwick	Alexandra Moltke (as Victoria Winters)	October 23, 1966	November 2, 1966	BEG3
94	"94"	Ron Sproat	John Sedwick	Alexandra Moltke (as Victoria Winters)	October 24, 1966	November 3, 1966	BEG3
95	"95"	Ron Sproat	John Sedwick	Alexandra Moltke (as Victoria Winters)	October 25, 1966	November 4, 1966	BEG3
96	"96"	Francis Swann	Lela Swift	Alexandra Moltke (as Victoria Winters)	October 26, 1966	November 7, 1966	BEG3
97	"97"	Francis Swann	Lela Swift	Alexandra Moltke (as Victoria Winters)	October 27, 1966	November 8, 1966	BEG3
98	"98"	Ron Sproat	Lela Swift	Alexandra Moltke (as Victoria Winters)	October 28, 1966	November 9, 1966	BEG3
99	"99"	Ron Sproat	Lela Swift	Alexandra Moltke (as Victoria Winters)	October 31, 1966	November 10, 1966	BEG3
100	"100"	Ron Sproat	Lela Swift	Alexandra Moltke (as Victoria Winters)	November 1, 1966	November 11, 1966	BEG3
101	"101"	Francis Swann	John Sedwick	Alexandra Moltke (as Victoria Winters)	November 2, 1966	November 14, 1966	BEG3
102	"102"	Francis Swann	John Sedwick	Alexandra Moltke (as Victoria Winters)	November 3, 1966	November 15, 1966	BEG3
103	"103"	Francis Swann	John Sedwick	Alexandra Moltke (as Victoria Winters)	November 4, 1966	November 16, 1966	BEG3
104	"104"	Francis Swann	John Sedwick	Alexandra Moltke (as Victoria Winters)	November 14, 1966	November 17, 1966	BEG3
105	"105"	Francis Swann	John Sedwick	Alexandra Moltke (as Victoria Winters)	November 15, 1966	November 18, 1966	BEG3
106	"106"	Francis Swann	Lela Swift	Alexandra Moltke (as Victoria Winters)	November 16, 1966	November 21, 1966	BEG4
107	"107"	Francis Swann	Lela Swift	Alexandra Moltke (as Victoria Winters)	November 18, 1966	November 22, 1966	BEG4
108	"108/109/110"	Ron Sproat	Lela Swift	Alexandra Moltke (as Victoria Winters)	November 21, 1966	November 23, 1966	BEG4
109	"111"	Ron Sproat	John Sedwick	Alexandra Moltke (as Victoria Winters)	November 22, 1966	November 28, 1966	BEG4
110	"112"	Ron Sproat	John Sedwick	Alexandra Moltke (as Victoria Winters)	November 23, 1966	November 29, 1966	BEG4
111	"113"	Francis Swann	John Sedwick	Alexandra Moltke (as Victoria Winters)	November 25, 1966	November 30, 1966	BEG4
112	"114"	Ron Sproat	John Sedwick	Alexandra Moltke (as Victoria Winters)	November 24, 1966	December 1, 1966	BEG4
113	"115"	Malcolm Marmorstein	John Sedwick	Alexandra Moltke (as Victoria Winters)	November 28, 1966	December 2, 1966	BEG4
114	"116"	Ron Sproat	Lela Swift	Alexandra Moltke (as Victoria Winters)	November 30, 1966	December 5, 1966	BEG4
115	"117"	Ron Sproat	Lela Swift	Alexandra Moltke (as Victoria Winters)	November 29, 1966	December 6, 1966	BEG4
116	"118"	Ron Sproat	Lela Swift	Alexandra Moltke (as Victoria Winters)	December 1, 1966	December 7, 1966	BEG4
117	"119"	Malcolm Marmorstein	Lela Swift	Alexandra Moltke (as Victoria Winters)	December 2, 1966	December 8, 1966	BEG4
118	"120"	Malcolm Marmorstein	Lela Swift	Alexandra Moltke (as Victoria Winters)	December 4, 1966	December 9, 1966	BEG4
119	"121"	Malcolm Marmorstein	Lela Swift	Alexandra Moltke (as Victoria Winters)	December 5, 1966	December 12, 1966	BEG4
120	"122"	Ron Sproat	Lela Swift	Alexandra Moltke (as Victoria Winters)	December 6, 1966	December 13, 1966	BEG4
121	"123"	Malcolm Marmorstein	John Sedwick	Alexandra Moltke (as Victoria Winters)	December 8, 1966	December 14, 1966	BEG4
122	"124"	Malcolm Marmorstein	John Sedwick	Alexandra Moltke (as Victoria Winters)	December 7, 1966	December 15, 1966	BEG4
123	"125"	Ron Sproat	John Sedwick	Alexandra Moltke (as Victoria Winters)	December 9, 1966	December 16, 1966	BEG4
124	"126"	Ron Sproat	Lela Swift	Alexandra Moltke (as Victoria Winters)	December 12, 1966	December 19, 1966	BEG4
125	"127"	Ron Sproat	Lela Swift	Alexandra Moltke (as Victoria Winters)	December 13, 1966	December 20, 1966	BEG4
126	"128"	Malcolm Marmorstein	Lela Swift	Alexandra Moltke (as Victoria Winters)	December 14, 1966	December 21, 1966	BEG4
127	"129"	Ron Sproat	Lela Swift	Alexandra Moltke (as Victoria Winters)	December 15, 1966	December 22, 1966	BEG4
128	"130/131"	Malcolm Marmorstein	Lela Swift	Alexandra Moltke (as Victoria Winters)	December 16, 1966	December 23, 1966	BEG4
129	"132"	Ron Sproat	John Sedwick	Alexandra Moltke (as Victoria Winters)	December 19, 1966	December 27, 1966	BEG4
130	"133"	Malcolm Marmorstein	John Sedwick	Alexandra Moltke (as Victoria Winters)	December 20, 1966	December 28, 1966	BEG4
131	"134"	Malcolm Marmorstein	John Sedwick	Alexandra Moltke (as Victoria Winters)	December 21, 1966	December 29, 1966	BEG4
132	"135"	Ron Sproat	John Sedwick	Alexandra Moltke (as Victoria Winters)	December 22, 1966	December 30, 1966	BEG4

== 1967 ==
#	Episode	Writer	Director	Narrator	Tape date	Original airdate	DVD volume
133	"136"	Ron Sproat	Lela Swift	Alexandra Moltke (as Victoria Winters)	December 27, 1966	January 2, 1967	BEG4
134	"137"	Malcolm Marmorstein	Lela Swift	Alexandra Moltke (as Victoria Winters)	December 23, 1966	January 3, 1967	BEG4
135	"138"	Malcolm Marmorstein	Lela Swift	Alexandra Moltke (as Victoria Winters)	December 28, 1966	January 4, 1967	BEG4
136	"139"	Ron Sproat	Lela Swift	Alexandra Moltke (as Victoria Winters)	December 29, 1966	January 5, 1967	BEG4
137	"140"	Malcolm Marmorstein	Lela Swift	Alexandra Moltke (as Victoria Winters)	December 30, 1966	January 6, 1967	BEG4
138	"141"	Ron Sproat	John Sedwick	Alexandra Moltke (as Victoria Winters)	January 2, 1967	January 9, 1967	BEG4
139	"142"	Malcolm Marmorstein	John Sedwick	Alexandra Moltke (as Victoria Winters)	January 3, 1967	January 10, 1967	BEG4
140	"143"	Ron Sproat	John Sedwick	Alexandra Moltke (as Victoria Winters)	January 4, 1967	January 11, 1967	BEG4
141	"144"	Ron Sproat	John Sedwick	Alexandra Moltke (as Victoria Winters)	January 5, 1967	January 12, 1967	BEG5
142	"145"	Malcolm Marmorstein	John Sedwick	Alexandra Moltke (as Victoria Winters)	January 6, 1967	January 13, 1967	BEG5
143	"146"	Malcolm Marmorstein	Lela Swift	Alexandra Moltke (as Victoria Winters)	January 9, 1967	January 16, 1967	BEG5
144	"147"	Ron Sproat	Lela Swift	Alexandra Moltke (as Victoria Winters)	January 10, 1967	January 17, 1967	BEG5
145	"148"	Ron Sproat	Lela Swift	Alexandra Moltke (as Victoria Winters)	January 11, 1967	January 18, 1967	BEG5
146	"149"	Malcolm Marmorstein	Lela Swift	Alexandra Moltke (as Victoria Winters)	January 12, 1967	January 19, 1967	BEG5
147	"150"	Malcolm Marmorstein	Lela Swift	Alexandra Moltke (as Victoria Winters)	January 13, 1967	January 20, 1967	BEG5
148	"151"	Malcolm Marmorstein	John Sedwick	Alexandra Moltke (as Victoria Winters)	January 16, 1967	January 23, 1967	BEG5
149	"152"	Malcolm Marmorstein	John Sedwick	Alexandra Moltke (as Victoria Winters)	January 17, 1967	January 24, 1967	BEG5
150	"153"	Ron Sproat	John Sedwick	Alexandra Moltke (as Victoria Winters)	January 18, 1967	January 25, 1967	BEG5
151	"154"	Ron Sproat	John Sedwick	Alexandra Moltke (as Victoria Winters)	January 19, 1967	January 26, 1967	BEG5
152	"155"	Ron Sproat	John Sedwick	Alexandra Moltke (as Victoria Winters)	January 20, 1967	January 27, 1967	BEG5
153	"156"	Ron Sproat	Lela Swift	Alexandra Moltke (as Victoria Winters)	January 23, 1967	January 30, 1967	BEG5
154	"157"	Ron Sproat	Lela Swift	Alexandra Moltke (as Victoria Winters)	January 24, 1967	January 31, 1967	BEG5
155	"158"	Malcolm Marmorstein	Lela Swift	Alexandra Moltke (as Victoria Winters)	January 25, 1967	February 1, 1967	BEG5
156	"159"	Malcolm Marmorstein	Lela Swift	Alexandra Moltke (as Victoria Winters)	January 27, 1967	February 2, 1967	BEG5
157	"160"	Malcolm Marmorstein	Lela Swift	Alexandra Moltke (as Victoria Winters)	January 26, 1967	February 3, 1967	BEG5
158	"161"	Malcolm Marmorstein	John Sedwick	Alexandra Moltke (as Victoria Winters)	January 30, 1967	February 6, 1967	BEG5
159	"162"	Ron Sproat	John Sedwick	Alexandra Moltke (as Victoria Winters)	February 2, 1967	February 7, 1967	BEG5
160	"163"	Malcolm Marmorstein	John Sedwick	Alexandra Moltke (as Victoria Winters)	February 1, 1967	February 8, 1967	BEG5
161	"164"	Ron Sproat	John Sedwick	Alexandra Moltke (as Victoria Winters)	January 31, 1967	February 9, 1967	BEG5
162	"165"	Ron Sproat	John Sedwick	Alexandra Moltke (as Victoria Winters)	February 3, 1967	February 10, 1967	BEG5
163	"166"	Malcolm Marmorstein	Lela Swift	Alexandra Moltke (as Victoria Winters)	February 6, 1967	February 13, 1967	BEG5
164	"167"	Ron Sproat	Lela Swift	Alexandra Moltke (as Victoria Winters)	February 7, 1967	February 14, 1967	BEG5
165	"168"	Malcolm Marmorstein	Lela Swift	Alexandra Moltke (as Victoria Winters)	February 8, 1967	February 15, 1967	BEG5
166	"169"	Ron Sproat	Lela Swift	Alexandra Moltke (as Victoria Winters)	February 9, 1967	February 16, 1967	BEG5
167	"170"	Malcolm Marmorstein	John Sedwick	Alexandra Moltke (as Victoria Winters)	February 10, 1967	February 17, 1967	BEG5
168	"171"	Ron Sproat	John Sedwick	Alexandra Moltke (as Victoria Winters)	February 13, 1967	February 20, 1967	BEG5
169	"172"	Malcolm Marmorstein	John Sedwick	Alexandra Moltke (as Victoria Winters)	February 14, 1967	February 21, 1967	BEG5
170	"173"	Malcolm Marmorstein	John Sedwick	Alexandra Moltke (as Victoria Winters)	February 15, 1967	February 22, 1967	BEG5
171	"174"	Ron Sproat	John Sedwick	Alexandra Moltke (as Victoria Winters)	February 16, 1967	February 23, 1967	BEG5
172	"175"	Ron Sproat	John Sedwick	Alexandra Moltke (as Victoria Winters)	February 17, 1967	February 24, 1967	BEG5
173	"176"	Malcolm Marmorstein	Lela Swift	Alexandra Moltke (as Victoria Winters)	February 19, 1967	February 27, 1967	BEG5
174	"177"	Malcolm Marmorstein	Lela Swift	Alexandra Moltke (as Victoria Winters)	February 20, 1967	February 28, 1967	BEG5
175	"178"	Malcolm Marmorstein	Lela Swift	Alexandra Moltke (as Victoria Winters)	February 21, 1967	March 1, 1967	BEG5
176	"179"	Ron Sproat	Lela Swift	Alexandra Moltke (as Victoria Winters)	February 22, 1967	March 2, 1967	BEG6
177	"180"	Ron Sproat	Lela Swift	Alexandra Moltke (as Victoria Winters)	February 23, 1967	March 3, 1967	BEG6
178	"181"	Ron Sproat	John Sedwick	Alexandra Moltke (as Victoria Winters)	February 24, 1967	March 6, 1967	BEG6
179	"182"	Ron Sproat	John Sedwick	Alexandra Moltke (as Victoria Winters)	February 25, 1967	March 7, 1967	BEG6
180	"183"	Ron Sproat	John Sedwick	Alexandra Moltke (as Victoria Winters)	February 27, 1967	March 8, 1967	BEG6
181	"184"	Malcolm Marmorstein	John Sedwick	Alexandra Moltke (as Victoria Winters)	February 28, 1967	March 9, 1967	BEG6
182	"185"	Malcolm Marmorstein	John Sedwick	Alexandra Moltke (as Victoria Winters)	March 1, 1967	March 10, 1967	BEG6
183	"186"	Ron Sproat	Lela Swift	Alexandra Moltke (as Victoria Winters)	March 2, 1967	March 13, 1967	BEG6
184	"187"	Malcolm Marmorstein	Lela Swift	Alexandra Moltke (as Victoria Winters)	March 3, 1967	March 14, 1967	BEG6
185	"188"	Malcolm Marmorstein	Lela Swift	Alexandra Moltke (as Victoria Winters)	March 5, 1967	March 15, 1967	BEG6
186	"189"	Ron Sproat	John Sedwick	Alexandra Moltke (as Victoria Winters)	March 8, 1967	March 16, 1967	BEG6
187	"190"	Ron Sproat	John Sedwick	Alexandra Moltke (as Victoria Winters)	March 6, 1967	March 17, 1967	BEG6
188	"191"	Malcolm Marmorstein	Lela Swift	Alexandra Moltke (as Victoria Winters)	March 7, 1967	March 20, 1967	BEG6
189	"192"	Ron Sproat	John Sedwick	Alexandra Moltke (as Victoria Winters)	March 9, 1967	March 21, 1967	BEG6
190	"193"	Ron Sproat	John Sedwick	Alexandra Moltke (as Victoria Winters)	March 10, 1967	March 22, 1967	BEG6
191	"194"	Ron Sproat	John Sedwick	Alexandra Moltke (as Victoria Winters)	March 12, 1967	March 23, 1967	BEG6
192	"195"	Malcolm Marmorstein	John Sedwick	Alexandra Moltke (as Victoria Winters)	March 13, 1967	March 24, 1967	BEG6
193	"196"	Malcolm Marmorstein	Lela Swift	Alexandra Moltke (as Victoria Winters)	March 14, 1967	March 27, 1967	BEG6
194	"197"	Malcolm Marmorstein	Lela Swift	Alexandra Moltke (as Victoria Winters)	March 15, 1967	March 28, 1967	BEG6
195	"198"	Ron Sproat	Lela Swift	Alexandra Moltke (as Victoria Winters)	March 16, 1967	March 29, 1967	BEG6
196	"199"	Ron Sproat	Lela Swift	Alexandra Moltke (as Victoria Winters)	March 17, 1967	March 30, 1967	BEG6
197	"200"	Ron Sproat	Lela Swift	Alexandra Moltke (as Victoria Winters)	March 19, 1967	March 31, 1967	BEG6
198	"201"	Ron Sproat	John Sedwick	Alexandra Moltke (as Victoria Winters)	March 20, 1967	April 3, 1967	BEG6
199	"202"	Malcolm Marmorstein	John Sedwick	Alexandra Moltke (as Victoria Winters)	March 21, 1967	April 4, 1967	BEG6
200	"203"	Malcolm Marmorstein	John Sedwick	Alexandra Moltke (as Victoria Winters)	March 22, 1967	April 5, 1967	BEG6
201	"204"	Ron Sproat	John Sedwick	Alexandra Moltke (as Victoria Winters)	March 24, 1967	April 6, 1967	BEG6
202	"205"	Ron Sproat	John Sedwick	Alexandra Moltke (as Victoria Winters)	March 23, 1967	April 7, 1967	BEG6
203	"206"	Ron Sproat	Lela Swift	Alexandra Moltke (as Victoria Winters)	March 27, 1967	April 11, 1967	BEG6
204	"207"	Malcolm Marmorstein	Lela Swift	Alexandra Moltke (as Victoria Winters)	March 26, 1967	April 12, 1967	BEG6
205	"208"	Ron Sproat	Lela Swift	Alexandra Moltke (as Victoria Winters)	April 11, 1967	April 13, 1967	BEG6
206	"209"	Ron Sproat	Lela Swift	Alexandra Moltke (as Victoria Winters)	April 12, 1967	April 14, 1967	BEG6
207	"210"	Malcolm Marmorstein	Lela Swift	Alexandra Moltke (as Victoria Winters)	April 13, 1967	April 17, 1967	VOL1
208	"211"	Ron Sproat	John Sedwick	Alexandra Moltke (as Victoria Winters)	April 14, 1967	April 18, 1967	VOL1
209	"212"	Ron Sproat	John Sedwick	Alexandra Moltke (as Victoria Winters)	April 15, 1967	April 19, 1967	VOL1
210	"213"	Ron Sproat	John Sedwick	Alexandra Moltke (as Victoria Winters)	April 18, 1967	April 20, 1967	VOL1
211	"214"	Malcolm Marmorstein	John Sedwick	Alexandra Moltke (as Victoria Winters)	April 17, 1967	April 21, 1967	VOL1
212	"215"	Malcolm Marmorstein	John Sedwick	Alexandra Moltke (as Victoria Winters)	April 19, 1967	April 24, 1967	VOL1
213	"216"	Ron Sproat	John Sedwick	Alexandra Moltke (as Victoria Winters)	April 20, 1967	April 25, 1967	VOL1
214	"217"	Ron Sproat	Lela Swift	Alexandra Moltke (as Victoria Winters)	April 21, 1967	April 26, 1967	VOL1
215	"218"	Malcolm Marmorstein	Lela Swift	Alexandra Moltke (as Victoria Winters)	April 23, 1967	April 27, 1967	VOL1
216	"219"	Ron Sproat	Lela Swift	Alexandra Moltke (as Victoria Winters)	April 24, 1967	April 28, 1967	VOL1
217	"220"	Malcolm Marmorstein	Lela Swift	Alexandra Moltke (as Victoria Winters)	April 25, 1967	May 1, 1967	VOL1
218	"221"	Ron Sproat	John Sedwick	Alexandra Moltke (as Victoria Winters)	April 26, 1967	May 2, 1967	VOL1
219	"222"	Malcolm Marmorstein	John Sedwick	Alexandra Moltke (as Victoria Winters)	April 27, 1967	May 3, 1967	VOL1
220	"223"	Ron Sproat	John Sedwick	Alexandra Moltke (as Victoria Winters)	April 28, 1967	May 4, 1967	VOL1
221	"224"	Malcolm Marmorstein	John Sedwick	Alexandra Moltke (as Victoria Winters)	April 30, 1967	May 5, 1967	VOL1
222	"225/226"	Ron Sproat	Lela Swift	Alexandra Moltke (as Victoria Winters)	May 3, 1967	May 8, 1967	VOL1
223	"227"	Malcolm Marmorstein	John Sedwick	Alexandra Moltke (as Victoria Winters)	May 1, 1967	May 9, 1967	VOL1
224	"228"	Ron Sproat	Lela Swift	Alexandra Moltke (as Victoria Winters)	May 2, 1967	May 10, 1967	VOL1
225	"229"	Malcolm Marmorstein	Lela Swift	Alexandra Moltke (as Victoria Winters)	May 4, 1967	May 11, 1967	VOL1
226	"230"	Ron Sproat	Lela Swift	Alexandra Moltke (as Victoria Winters)	May 5, 1967	May 12, 1967	VOL1
227	"231"	Malcolm Marmorstein	John Sedwick	Alexandra Moltke (as Victoria Winters)	May 7, 1967	May 15, 1967	VOL1
228	"232"	Ron Sproat	John Sedwick	Alexandra Moltke (as Victoria Winters)	May 8, 1967	May 16, 1967	VOL1
229	"233"	Malcolm Marmorstein	John Sedwick	Alexandra Moltke (as Victoria Winters)	May 11, 1967	May 17, 1967	VOL1
230	"234"	Ron Sproat	John Sedwick	Alexandra Moltke (as Victoria Winters)	May 9, 1967	May 18, 1967	VOL1
231	"235"	Ron Sproat	John Sedwick	Alexandra Moltke (as Victoria Winters)	May 10, 1967	May 19, 1967	VOL1
232	"236"	Ron Sproat	Lela Swift	Alexandra Moltke (as Victoria Winters)	May 12, 1967	May 22, 1967	VOL1
233	"237"	Malcolm Marmorstein	Lela Swift	Alexandra Moltke (as Victoria Winters)	May 14, 1967	May 23, 1967	VOL1
234	"238"	Malcolm Marmorstein	Lela Swift	Alexandra Moltke (as Victoria Winters)	May 16, 1967	May 24, 1967	VOL1
235	"239"	Ron Sproat	Lela Swift	Alexandra Moltke (as Victoria Winters)	May 15, 1967	May 25, 1967	VOL1
236	"240"	Ron Sproat	Lela Swift	Alexandra Moltke (as Victoria Winters)	May 17, 1967	May 26, 1967	VOL1
237	"241"	Malcolm Marmorstein	John Sedwick	Alexandra Moltke (as Victoria Winters)	May 18, 1967	May 29, 1967	VOL1
238	"242"	Ron Sproat	John Sedwick	Alexandra Moltke (as Victoria Winters)	May 19, 1967	May 30, 1967	VOL1
239	"243"	Ron Sproat	John Sedwick	Alexandra Moltke (as Victoria Winters)	May 21, 1967	May 31, 1967	VOL1
240	"244"	Malcolm Marmorstein	John Sedwick	Alexandra Moltke (as Victoria Winters)	May 22, 1967	June 1, 1967	VOL1
241	"245"	Joe Caldwell	John Sedwick	Alexandra Moltke (as Victoria Winters)	May 23, 1967	June 2, 1967	VOL1
242	"246"	Ron Sproat	Lela Swift	Alexandra Moltke (as Victoria Winters)	May 26, 1967	June 5, 1967	VOL1
243	"247"	Malcolm Marmorstein	Lela Swift	Alexandra Moltke (as Victoria Winters)	May 24, 1967	June 6, 1967	VOL1
244	"248"	Ron Sproat	Lela Swift	Alexandra Moltke (as Victoria Winters)	May 25, 1967	June 7, 1967	VOL1
245	"249"	Ron Sproat	Lela Swift	Alexandra Moltke (as Victoria Winters)	June 4, 1967	June 8, 1967	VOL1
246	"250"	Joe Caldwell	Lela Swift	Alexandra Moltke (as Victoria Winters)	May 29, 1967	June 9, 1967	VOL1
247	"251"	Ron Sproat	John Sedwick	Alexandra Moltke (as Victoria Winters)	May 30, 1967	June 12, 1967	VOL2
248	"252"	Malcolm Marmorstein	John Sedwick	Alexandra Moltke (as Victoria Winters)	June 5, 1967	June 13, 1967	VOL2
249	"253"	Joe Caldwell	John Sedwick	Alexandra Moltke (as Victoria Winters)	May 31, 1967	June 14, 1967	VOL2
250	"254"	Joe Caldwell	John Sedwick	Alexandra Moltke (as Victoria Winters)	June 6, 1967	June 15, 1967	VOL2
251	"255"	Ron Sproat	John Sedwick	Alexandra Moltke (as Victoria Winters)	June 1, 1967	June 16, 1967	VOL2
252	"256"	Malcolm Marmorstein	Lela Swift	Alexandra Moltke (as Victoria Winters)	June 7, 1967	June 19, 1967	VOL2
253	"257"	Malcolm Marmorstein	Lela Swift	Alexandra Moltke (as Victoria Winters)	June 8, 1967	June 20, 1967	VOL2
254	"258"	Malcolm Marmorstein	Lela Swift	Alexandra Moltke (as Victoria Winters)	June 2, 1967	June 21, 1967	VOL2
255	"259"	Joe Caldwell	Lela Swift	Alexandra Moltke (as Victoria Winters)	June 9, 1967	June 22, 1967	VOL2
256	"260"	Ron Sproat	John Sedwick	Alexandra Moltke (as Victoria Winters)	June 11, 1967	June 23, 1967	VOL2
257	"261"	Ron Sproat	John Sedwick	Alexandra Moltke (as Victoria Winters)	June 12, 1967	June 26, 1967	VOL2
258	"262"	Joe Caldwell	John Sedwick	Alexandra Moltke (as Victoria Winters)	June 13, 1967	June 27, 1967	VOL2
259	"263"	Ron Sproat	John Sedwick	Alexandra Moltke (as Victoria Winters)	June 14, 1967	June 28, 1967	VOL2
260	"264"	Malcolm Marmorstein	John Sedwick	Alexandra Moltke (as Victoria Winters)	June 15, 1967	June 29, 1967	VOL2
261	"265"	Joe Caldwell	John Sedwick	Alexandra Moltke (as Victoria Winters)	June 16, 1967	June 30, 1967	VOL2
262	"266"	Ron Sproat	Lela Swift	Alexandra Moltke (as Victoria Winters)	June 18, 1967	July 3, 1967	VOL2
263	"267"	Malcolm Marmorstein	Lela Swift	Alexandra Moltke (as Victoria Winters)	June 20, 1967	July 4, 1967	VOL2
264	"268"	Ron Sproat	Lela Swift	Alexandra Moltke (as Victoria Winters)	June 19, 1967	July 5, 1967	VOL2
265	"269"	Malcolm Marmorstein	Lela Swift	Alexandra Moltke (as Victoria Winters)	June 21, 1967	July 6, 1967	VOL2
266	"270"	Joe Caldwell	Lela Swift	Alexandra Moltke (as Victoria Winters)	June 22, 1967	July 7, 1967	VOL2
267	"271"	Joe Caldwell	John Sedwick	Alexandra Moltke (as Victoria Winters)	June 23, 1967	July 10, 1967	VOL2
268	"272"	Joe Caldwell	John Sedwick	Alexandra Moltke (as Victoria Winters)	June 26, 1967	July 11, 1967	VOL2
269	"273"	Joe Caldwell	John Sedwick	Alexandra Moltke (as Victoria Winters)	June 25, 1967	July 12, 1967	VOL2
270	"274"	Malcolm Marmorstein	John Sedwick	Alexandra Moltke (as Victoria Winters)	June 27, 1967	July 13, 1967	VOL2
271	"275"	Ron Sproat	John Sedwick	Nancy Barrett	June 28, 1967	July 14, 1967	VOL2
272	"276"	Ron Sproat	Lela Swift	Kathryn Leigh Scott	June 29, 1967	July 17, 1967	VOL2
273	"277"	Malcolm Marmorstein	Lela Swift	Alexandra Moltke	July 5, 1967	July 18, 1967	VOL2
274	"278"	Joe Caldwell	Lela Swift	Alexandra Moltke	July 3, 1967	July 19, 1967	VOL2
275	"279"	Malcolm Marmorstein	Lela Swift	Alexandra Moltke	June 30, 1967	July 20, 1967	VOL2
276	"280"	Ron Sproat	Lela Swift	Alexandra Moltke	July 4, 1967	July 21, 1967	VOL2
277	"281"	Joe Caldwell	John Sedwick	Alexandra Moltke	July 6, 1967	July 24, 1967	VOL2
278	"282"	Malcolm Marmorstein	John Sedwick	Alexandra Moltke	July 7, 1967	July 25, 1967	VOL2
279	"283"	Ron Sproat	John Sedwick	Alexandra Moltke	July 9, 1967	July 26, 1967	VOL2
280	"284"	Joe Caldwell	John Sedwick	Alexandra Moltke	July 10, 1967	July 27, 1967	VOL2
281	"285"	Joe Caldwell	John Sedwick	Alexandra Moltke	July 11, 1967	July 28, 1967	VOL2
282	"286"	Ron Sproat	John Sedwick	Alexandra Moltke	July 12, 1967	July 31, 1967	VOL2
283	"287"	Joe Caldwell	John Sedwick	Alexandra Moltke	July 13, 1967	August 1, 1967	VOL2
284	"288"	Ron Sproat	John Sedwick	Alexandra Moltke	July 14, 1967	August 2, 1967	VOL2
285	"289"	Malcolm Marmorstein	John Sedwick	Alexandra Moltke	July 16, 1967	August 3, 1967	VOL2
286	"290"	Joe Caldwell	John Sedwick	Alexandra Moltke	July 17, 1967	August 4, 1967	VOL2
287	"291"	Malcolm Marmorstein	John Sedwick	Grayson Hall	July 18, 1967	August 7, 1967	VOL3
288	"292"	Gordon Russell	John Sedwick	Alexandra Moltke	July 19, 1967	August 8, 1967	VOL3
289	"293"	Gordon Russell	John Sedwick	Alexandra Moltke	July 20, 1967	August 9, 1967	VOL3
290	"294"	Gordon Russell	John Sedwick	Alexandra Moltke	July 21, 1967	August 10, 1967	VOL3
291	"295"	Malcolm Marmorstein	John Sedwick	Alexandra Moltke	July 31, 1967	August 11, 1967	VOL3
292	"296"	Ron Sproat	Lela Swift	Grayson Hall	August 1, 1967	August 14, 1967	VOL3
293	"297"	Malcolm Marmorstein	Lela Swift	Kathryn Leigh Scott	August 2, 1967	August 15, 1967	VOL3
294	"298"	Ron Sproat	Lela Swift	Alexandra Moltke	August 3, 1967	August 16, 1967	VOL3
295	"299"	Ron Sproat	Lela Swift	Alexandra Moltke	August 4, 1967	August 17, 1967	VOL3
296	"300"	Ron Sproat	Lela Swift	Alexandra Moltke	August 8, 1967	August 18, 1967	VOL3
297	"301"	Malcolm Marmorstein	John Sedwick	Alexandra Moltke	August 10, 1967	August 21, 1967	VOL3
298	"302"	Gordon Russell	Lela Swift	Alexandra Moltke	August 7, 1967	August 22, 1967	VOL3
299	"303"	Gordon Russell	John Sedwick	Alexandra Moltke	August 14, 1967	August 23, 1967	VOL3
300	"304"	Ron Sproat	John Sedwick	Alexandra Moltke	August 9, 1967	August 24, 1967	VOL3
301	"305"	Malcolm Marmorstein	John Sedwick	Grayson Hall	August 11, 1967	August 25, 1967	VOL3
302	"306"	Gordon Russell	Lela Swift	Alexandra Moltke	August 18, 1967	August 28, 1967	VOL3
303	"307"	Gordon Russell	John Sedwick	Alexandra Moltke	August 15, 1967	August 29, 1967	VOL3
304	"308"	Malcolm Marmorstein	John Sedwick	Grayson Hall	August 16, 1967	August 30, 1967	VOL3
305	"309"	Malcolm Marmorstein	John Sedwick	Alexandra Moltke	August 17, 1967	August 31, 1967	VOL3
306	"310"	Ron Sproat	Lela Swift	Nancy Barrett	August 21, 1967	September 1, 1967	VOL3
307	"311"	Ron Sproat	Lela Swift	Alexandra Moltke	August 22, 1967	September 4, 1967	VOL3
308	"312"	Ron Sproat	John Sedwick	Alexandra Moltke	August 23, 1967	September 5, 1967	VOL3
309	"313"	Ron Sproat	John Sedwick	Alexandra Moltke	August 24, 1967	September 6, 1967	VOL3
310	"314"	Ron Sproat	John Sedwick	Grayson Hall	August 25, 1967	September 7, 1967	VOL3
311	"315"	Gordon Russell	John Sedwick	Alexandra Moltke	August 29, 1967	September 8, 1967	VOL3
312	"316"	Gordon Russell	John Sedwick	Alexandra Moltke	August 28, 1967	September 11, 1967	VOL3
313	"317"	Gordon Russell	Lela Swift	Grayson Hall	August 30, 1967	September 12, 1967	VOL3
314	"318"	Gordon Russell	Lela Swift	Grayson Hall	August 31, 1967	September 13, 1967	VOL3
315	"319"	Ron Sproat	Lela Swift	Kathryn Leigh Scott	September 1, 1967	September 14, 1967	VOL3
316	"320"	Ron Sproat	John Sedwick	Alexandra Moltke	September 7, 1967	September 15, 1967	VOL3
317	"321"	Ron Sproat	Lela Swift	Kathryn Leigh Scott	September 4, 1967	September 18, 1967	VOL3
318	"322"	Ron Sproat	Lela Swift	Kathryn Leigh Scott	September 5, 1967	September 19, 1967	VOL3
319	"323"	Gordon Russell	John Sedwick	Kathryn Leigh Scott	September 8, 1967	September 20, 1967	VOL3
320	"324"	Gordon Russell	John Sedwick	Alexandra Moltke	September 6, 1967	September 21, 1967	VOL3
321	"325"	Gordon Russell	John Sedwick	Alexandra Moltke	September 11, 1967	September 22, 1967	VOL3
322	"326"	Gordon Russell	John Sedwick	Alexandra Moltke	September 12, 1967	September 25, 1967	VOL3
323	"327"	Gordon Russell	Lela Swift	Alexandra Moltke	September 13, 1967	September 26, 1967	VOL3
324	"328"	Gordon Russell	Lela Swift	Grayson Hall	September 18, 1967	September 27, 1967	VOL3
325	"329"	Ron Sproat	John Sedwick	Grayson Hall	September 15, 1967	September 28, 1967	VOL3
326	"330"	Ron Sproat	Lela Swift	Grayson Hall	September 14, 1967	September 29, 1967	VOL3
327	"331"	Ron Sproat	John Sedwick	Joan Bennett	September 21, 1967	October 2, 1967	VOL4
328	"332"	Ron Sproat	Lela Swift	Grayson Hall	September 19, 1967	October 3, 1967	VOL4
329	"333"	Ron Sproat	John Sedwick	Grayson Hall	September 20, 1967	October 4, 1967	VOL4
330	"334"	Gordon Russell	John Sedwick	Alexandra Moltke	September 22, 1967	October 5, 1967	VOL4
331	"335"	Gordon Russell	John Sedwick	Joan Bennett	October 3, 1967	October 6, 1967	VOL4
332	"336"	Gordon Russell	John Sedwick	Alexandra Moltke	October 4, 1967	October 9, 1967	VOL4
333	"337"	Gordon Russell	John Sedwick	Joan Bennett	October 5, 1967	October 10, 1967	VOL4
334	"338"	Gordon Russell	John Sedwick	Alexandra Moltke	October 6, 1967	October 11, 1967	VOL4
335	"339"	Ron Sproat	Lela Swift	Joan Bennett	October 9, 1967	October 12, 1967	VOL4
336	"340"	Ron Sproat	Lela Swift	Grayson Hall	October 10, 1967	October 13, 1967	VOL4
337	"341"	Joe Caldwell	John Sedwick	Grayson Hall	October 11, 1967	October 16, 1967	VOL4
338	"342"	Joe Caldwell	John Sedwick	Kathryn Leigh Scott	October 12, 1967	October 17, 1967	VOL4
339	"343"	Joe Caldwell	Lela Swift	Alexandra Moltke	October 8, 1967	October 18, 1967	VOL4
340	"344"	Joe Caldwell	Lela Swift	Alexandra Moltke	October 13, 1967	October 19, 1967	VOL4
341	"345"	Gordon Russell	John Sedwick	Alexandra Moltke	October 16, 1967	October 20, 1967	VOL4
342	"346"	Gordon Russell	John Sedwick	Alexandra Moltke	October 17, 1967	October 23, 1967	VOL4
343	"347"	Joe Caldwell	Lela Swift	Alexandra Moltke	October 18, 1967	October 24, 1967	VOL4
344	"348"	Joe Caldwell	Lela Swift	Joan Bennett	October 19, 1967	October 25, 1967	VOL4
345	"349"	Ron Sproat	Lela Swift	Alexandra Moltke	October 20, 1967	October 26, 1967	VOL4
346	"350"	Ron Sproat	Lela Swift	Grayson Hall	October 23, 1967	October 27, 1967	VOL4
347	"351"	Gordon Russell	John Sedwick	Joan Bennett	October 26, 1967	October 30, 1967	VOL4
348	"352"	Gordon Russell	Lela Swift	Alexandra Moltke	October 24, 1967	October 31, 1967	VOL4
349	"353"	Ron Sproat	John Sedwick	Alexandra Moltke	October 27, 1967	November 1, 1967	VOL4
350	"354"	Ron Sproat	John Sedwick	Alexandra Moltke	October 25, 1967	November 2, 1967	VOL4
351	"355"	Gordon Russell	John Sedwick	Clarice Blackburn	October 30, 1967	November 3, 1967	VOL4
352	"356"	Gordon Russell	Lela Swift	Nancy Barrett	November 2, 1967	November 6, 1967	VOL4
353	"357"	Sam Hall	Lela Swift	Nancy Barrett	November 3, 1967	November 7, 1967	VOL4
354	"358"	Sam Hall	John Sedwick	Grayson Hall	October 31, 1967	November 8, 1967	VOL4
355	"359"	Sam Hall	Lela Swift	Nancy Barrett	November 1, 1967	November 9, 1967	VOL4
356	"360"	Ron Sproat	Lela Swift	Kathryn Leigh Scott	November 6, 1967	November 10, 1967	VOL4
357	"361"	Ron Sproat	Lela Swift	Nancy Barrett	November 7, 1967	November 13, 1967	VOL4
358	"362"	Ron Sproat	John Sedwick	Nancy Barrett	November 8, 1967	November 14, 1967	VOL4
359	"363"	Gordon Russell	John Sedwick	Grayson Hall	November 9, 1967	November 15, 1967	VOL4
360	"364"	Gordon Russell	John Sedwick	Alexandra Moltke	November 10, 1967	November 16, 1967	VOL4
361	"365"	Sam Hall	John Sedwick	Alexandra Moltke	November 13, 1967	November 17, 1967	VOL4
362	"366"	Gordon Russell	John Sedwick	Joan Bennett	November 14, 1967	November 20, 1967	VOL4
363	"367"	Ron Sproat	Lela Swift	Joan Bennett	November 15, 1967	November 21, 1967	VOL4
364	"368/369"	Sam Hall	Lela Swift	Joan Bennett	November 16, 1967	November 22, 1967	VOL4
365	"370"	Gordon Russell	Lela Swift	Kathryn Leigh Scott	November 20, 1967	November 24, 1967	VOL4
366	"371"	Gordon Russell	Lela Swift	Alexandra Moltke	November 17, 1967	November 27, 1967	VOL4
367	"372"	Ron Sproat	Lela Swift	Lara Parker	November 21, 1967	November 28, 1967	VOL5
368	"373"	Sam Hall	John Sedwick	Alexandra Moltke	November 22, 1967	November 29, 1967	VOL5
369	"374"	Sam Hall	Lela Swift	Kathryn Leigh Scott	November 24, 1967	November 30, 1967	VOL5
370	"375"	Sam Hall	John Sedwick	Grayson Hall	November 28, 1967	December 1, 1967	VOL5
371	"376"	Gordon Russell	John Sedwick	Joan Bennett	November 27, 1967	December 4, 1967	VOL5
372	"377"	Sam Hall	Lela Swift	Nancy Barrett	November 29, 1967	December 5, 1967	VOL5
373	"378"	Sam Hall	Lela Swift	Kathryn Leigh Scott	December 1, 1967	December 6, 1967	VOL5
374	"379"	Sam Hall	Lela Swift	Alexandra Moltke	November 30, 1967	December 7, 1967	VOL5
375	"380"	Gordon Russell	Lela Swift	Lara Parker	December 4, 1967	December 8, 1967	VOL5
376	"381"	Gordon Russell	Lela Swift	Lara Parker	December 5, 1967	December 11, 1967	VOL5
377	"382"	Sam Hall	John Sedwick	Joan Bennett	December 6, 1967	December 12, 1967	VOL5
378	"383"	Sam Hall	John Sedwick	Kathryn Leigh Scott	December 7, 1967	December 13, 1967	VOL5
379	"384"	Sam Hall	John Sedwick	Kathryn Leigh Scott	December 8, 1967	December 14, 1967	VOL5
380	"385"	Gordon Russell	John Sedwick	Clarice Blackburn	December 11, 1967	December 15, 1967	VOL5
381	"386"	Gordon Russell	John Sedwick	Grayson Hall	December 12, 1967	December 18, 1967	VOL5
382	"387"	Gordon Russell	Lela Swift	Lara Parker	December 13, 1967	December 19, 1967	VOL5
383	"388"	Ron Sproat	Lela Swift	Kathryn Leigh Scott	December 14, 1967	December 20, 1967	VOL5
384	"389"	Ron Sproat	Lela Swift	Alexandra Moltke	December 15, 1967	December 21, 1967	VOL5
385	"390/391"	Ron Sproat	Lela Swift	Lara Parker	December 18, 1967	December 22, 1967	VOL5
386	"392"	Sam Hall	Lela Swift	Kathryn Leigh Scott	December 19, 1967	December 26, 1967	VOL5
387	"393"	Sam Hall	John Sedwick	Grayson Hall	December 20, 1967	December 27, 1967	VOL5
388	"394"	Gordon Russell	John Sedwick	Clarice Blackburn	December 22, 1967	December 28, 1967	VOL5
389	"395"	Gordon Russell	John Sedwick	Joan Bennett	December 21, 1967	December 29, 1967	VOL5

== 1968 ==
#	Episode	Writer	Director	Narrator	Tape date	Original airdate	DVD volume
390	"396"	Ron Sproat	John Sedwick	Lara Parker	December 26, 1967	January 1, 1968	VOL5
391	"397"	Sam Hall	Lela Swift	Joan Bennett	December 27, 1967	January 2, 1968	VOL5
392	"398"	Gordon Russell	Lela Swift	Alexandra Moltke	December 28, 1967	January 3, 1968	VOL5
393	"399"	Ron Sproat	Lela Swift	Alexandra Moltke	December 29, 1967	January 4, 1968	VOL5
394	"400"	Ron Sproat	Lela Swift	Alexandra Moltke	January 1, 1968	January 5, 1968	VOL5
395	"401"	Ron Sproat	Lela Swift	Alexandra Moltke	January 2, 1968	January 8, 1968	VOL5
396	"402"	Sam Hall	John Sedwick	Joan Bennett	January 3, 1968	January 9, 1968	VOL5
397	"403"	Sam Hall	John Sedwick	Nancy Barrett	January 4, 1968	January 10, 1968	VOL5
398	"404"	Ron Sproat	John Sedwick	Alexandra Moltke	January 5, 1968	January 11, 1968	VOL5
399	"405"	Gordon Russell	John Sedwick	Lara Parker	January 8, 1968	January 12, 1968	VOL5
400	"406"	Gordon Russell	John Sedwick	Kathryn Leigh Scott	January 9, 1968	January 15, 1968	VOL5
401	"407"	Ron Sproat	Lela Swift	Joan Bennett	January 10, 1968	January 16, 1968	VOL5
402	"408"	Ron Sproat	Lela Swift	Alexandra Moltke	January 11, 1968	January 17, 1968	VOL5
403	"409"	Sam Hall	Lela Swift	Joan Bennett	January 12, 1968	January 18, 1968	VOL5
404	"410"	Sam Hall	Lela Swift	Kathryn Leigh Scott	January 15, 1968	January 19, 1968	VOL5
405	"411"	Gordon Russell	Lela Swift	Lara Parker	January 16, 1968	January 22, 1968	VOL5
406	"412"	Gordon Russell	John Sedwick	Alexandra Moltke	January 17, 1968	January 23, 1968	VOL5
407	"413"	Gordon Russell	John Sedwick	Joan Bennett	January 18, 1968	January 24, 1968	VOL6
408	"414"	Sam Hall	John Sedwick	Joan Bennett	January 19, 1968	January 25, 1968	VOL6
409	"415"	Sam Hall	John Sedwick	Nancy Barrett	January 22, 1968	January 26, 1968	VOL6
410	"416"	Ron Sproat	John Sedwick	Alexandra Moltke	January 23, 1968	January 29, 1968	VOL6
411	"417"	Ron Sproat	Lela Swift	Kathryn Leigh Scott	January 24, 1968	January 30, 1968	VOL6
412	"418"	Ron Sproat	Lela Swift	Kathryn Leigh Scott	January 25, 1968	January 31, 1968	VOL6
413	"419"	Gordon Russell	Lela Swift	Nancy Barrett	January 26, 1968	February 1, 1968	VOL6
414	"420"	Gordon Russell	Lela Swift	Nancy Barrett	January 29, 1968	February 2, 1968	VOL6
415	"421"	Sam Hall	Lela Swift	Alexandra Moltke	January 30, 1968	February 5, 1968	VOL6
416	"422"	Ron Sproat	John Sedwick	Grayson Hall	January 31, 1968	February 6, 1968	VOL6
417	"423"	Ron Sproat	John Sedwick	Grayson Hall	February 1, 1968	February 7, 1968	VOL6
418	"424"	Gordon Russell	John Sedwick	Joan Bennett	February 2, 1968	February 8, 1968	VOL6
419	"425"	Gordon Russell	John Sedwick	Grayson Hall	February 5, 1968	February 9, 1968	VOL6
420	"426"	Sam Hall	John Sedwick	Nancy Barrett	February 6, 1968	February 12, 1968	VOL6
421	"427"	Sam Hall	Lela Swift	Alexandra Moltke	February 7, 1968	February 13, 1968	VOL6
422	"428"	Gordon Russell	Lela Swift	Nancy Barrett	February 8, 1968	February 14, 1968	VOL6
423	"429"	Ron Sproat	Lela Swift	Clarice Blackburn	February 9, 1968	February 15, 1968	VOL6
424	"430"	Ron Sproat	Lela Swift	Kathryn Leigh Scott	February 12, 1968	February 16, 1968	VOL6
425	"431"	Sam Hall	Lela Swift	Clarice Blackburn	February 13, 1968	February 19, 1968	VOL6
426	"432"	Sam Hall	John Sedwick	Joan Bennett	February 14, 1968	February 20, 1968	VOL6
427	"433"	Gordon Russell	John Sedwick	Alexandra Moltke	February 16, 1968	February 21, 1968	VOL6
428	"434"	Sam Hall	John Sedwick	Joan Bennett	February 15, 1968	February 22, 1968	VOL6
429	"435"	Gordon Russell	John Sedwick	Lara Parker	February 19, 1968	February 23, 1968	VOL6
430	"436"	Ron Sproat	John Sedwick	Alexandra Moltke	February 20, 1968	February 26, 1968	VOL6
431	"437"	Ron Sproat	Lela Swift	Alexandra Moltke	February 21, 1968	February 27, 1968	VOL6
432	"438"	Gordon Russell	Lela Swift	Joan Bennett	February 23, 1968	February 28, 1968	VOL6
433	"439"	Sam Hall	Lela Swift	Vala Clifton	February 22, 1968	February 29, 1968	VOL6
434	"440"	Sam Hall	Lela Swift	Vala Clifton	February 26, 1968	March 1, 1968	VOL6
435	"441"	Gordon Russell	Lela Swift	Joan Bennett	February 27, 1968	March 4, 1968	VOL6
436	"442"	Ron Sproat	John Sedwick	Clarice Blackburn	February 28, 1968	March 5, 1968	VOL6
437	"443"	Sam Hall	John Sedwick	Grayson Hall	February 29, 1968	March 6, 1968	VOL6
438	"444"	Gordon Russell	John Sedwick	Joan Bennett	March 1, 1968	March 7, 1968	VOL6
439	"445"	Ron Sproat	John Sedwick	Joan Bennett	March 4, 1968	March 8, 1968	VOL6
440	"446"	Sam Hall	John Sedwick	Joan Bennett	March 5, 1968	March 11, 1968	VOL6
441	"447"	Gordon Russell	Lela Swift	Nancy Barrett	March 6, 1968	March 12, 1968	VOL6
442	"448"	Ron Sproat	Lela Swift	Joan Bennett	March 7, 1968	March 13, 1968	VOL6
443	"449"	Sam Hall	Lela Swift	Nancy Barrett	March 8, 1968	March 14, 1968	VOL6
444	"450"	Sam Hall	Lela Swift	Nancy Barrett	March 11, 1968	March 15, 1968	VOL6
445	"451"	Ron Sproat	Lela Swift	Nancy Barrett	March 12, 1968	March 18, 1968	VOL6
446	"452"	Ron Sproat	John Sedwick	Alexandra Moltke	March 13, 1968	March 19, 1968	VOL6
447	"453"	Gordon Russell	John Sedwick	Alexandra Moltke	March 14, 1968	March 20, 1968	VOL7
448	"454"	Gordon Russell	John Sedwick	Alexandra Moltke	March 15, 1968	March 21, 1968	VOL7
449	"455"	Sam Hall	John Sedwick	Alexandra Moltke	March 18, 1968	March 22, 1968	VOL7
450	"456"	Sam Hall	John Sedwick	Alexandra Moltke	March 19, 1968	March 25, 1968	VOL7
451	"457"	Gordon Russell	Dan Curtis	Nancy Barrett	March 20, 1968	March 26, 1968	VOL7
452	"458"	Gordon Russell	Dan Curtis	Alexandra Moltke	March 21, 1968	March 27, 1968	VOL7
453	"459"	Ron Sproat	Dan Curtis	Thayer David	March 22, 1968	March 28, 1968	VOL7
454	"460"	Ron Sproat	Dan Curtis	Alexandra Moltke	March 25, 1968	March 29, 1968	VOL7
455	"461"	Sam Hall	Dan Curtis	Nancy Barrett	March 26, 1968	April 1, 1968	VOL7
456	"462"	Sam Hall	John Sedwick	Alexandra Moltke	March 27, 1968	April 2, 1968	VOL7
457	"463"	Sam Hall	John Sedwick	Nancy Barrett	March 28, 1968	April 3, 1968	VOL7
458	"464"	Gordon Russell	John Sedwick	Grayson Hall	March 29, 1968	April 4, 1968	VOL7
459	"465"	Gordon Russell	John Sedwick	Alexandra Moltke	April 1, 1968	April 5, 1968	VOL7
460	"466"	Sam Hall	John Sedwick	Grayson Hall	April 2, 1968	April 8, 1968	VOL7
461	"467"	Sam Hall	Lela Swift	Joan Bennett	April 3, 1968	April 9, 1968	VOL7
462	"468"	Sam Hall	Lela Swift	Nancy Barrett	April 4, 1968	April 10, 1968	VOL7
463	"469"	Gordon Russell	Lela Swift	Grayson Hall	April 5, 1968	April 11, 1968	VOL7
464	"470"	Gordon Russell	Lela Swift	Alexandra Moltke	April 8, 1968	April 12, 1968	VOL7
465	"471"	Gordon Russell	Lela Swift	Alexandra Moltke	April 9, 1968	April 15, 1968	VOL7
466	"472"	Gordon Russell	John Sedwick	Grayson Hall	April 10, 1968	April 16, 1968	VOL7
467	"473"	Sam Hall	John Sedwick	Alexandra Moltke	April 11, 1968	April 17, 1968	VOL7
468	"474"	Sam Hall	John Sedwick	Alexandra Moltke	April 12, 1968	April 18, 1968	VOL7
469	"475"	Sam Hall	John Sedwick	Lara Parker	April 15, 1968	April 19, 1968	VOL7
470	"476"	Gordon Russell	Lela Swift	Alexandra Moltke	April 17, 1968	April 22, 1968	VOL7
471	"477"	Gordon Russell	John Sedwick	Nancy Barrett	April 16, 1968	April 23, 1968	VOL7
472	"478"	Gordon Russell	Lela Swift	Alexandra Moltke	April 18, 1968	April 24, 1968	VOL7
473	"479"	Ron Sproat	Lela Swift	Alexandra Moltke	April 19, 1968	April 25, 1968	VOL7
474	"480"	Ron Sproat	Lela Swift	Lara Parker	April 22, 1968	April 26, 1968	VOL7
475	"481"	Sam Hall	Lela Swift	Lara Parker	April 23, 1968	April 29, 1968	VOL7
476	"482"	Sam Hall	John Sedwick	Alexandra Moltke	April 24, 1968	April 30, 1968	VOL7
477	"483"	Gordon Russell	John Sedwick	Kathryn Leigh Scott	April 25, 1968	May 1, 1968	VOL7
478	"484"	Gordon Russell	John Sedwick	Grayson Hall	April 26, 1968	May 2, 1968	VOL7
479	"485"	Sam Hall	John Sedwick	Lara Parker	April 29, 1968	May 3, 1968	VOL7
480	"486"	Sam Hall	John Sedwick	Clarice Blackburn	April 30, 1968	May 6, 1968	VOL7
481	"487"	Ron Sproat	Lela Swift	Alexandra Moltke	May 1, 1968	May 7, 1968	VOL7
482	"488"	Ron Sproat	Lela Swift	Kathryn Leigh Scott	May 2, 1968	May 8, 1968	VOL7
483	"489"	Gordon Russell	Lela Swift	Clarice Blackburn	May 3, 1968	May 9, 1968	VOL7
484	"490"	Gordon Russell	Lela Swift	Alexandra Moltke	May 6, 1968	May 10, 1968	VOL7
485	"491"	Sam Hall	Lela Swift	Joan Bennett	May 7, 1968	May 13, 1968	VOL7
486	"492"	Gordon Russell	John Sedwick	Clarice Blackburn	May 8, 1968	May 14, 1968	VOL7
487	"493"	Ron Sproat	John Sedwick	Clarice Blackburn	May 9, 1968	May 15, 1968	VOL8
488	"494"	Ron Sproat	John Sedwick	Grayson Hall	May 10, 1968	May 16, 1968	VOL8
489	"495"	Sam Hall	John Sedwick	Joan Bennett	May 13, 1968	May 17, 1968	VOL8
490	"496"	Gordon Russell	John Sedwick	Grayson Hall	May 14, 1968	May 20, 1968	VOL8
491	"497"	Gordon Russell	Lela Swift	Kathryn Leigh Scott	May 20, 1968	May 21, 1968	VOL8
492	"498"	Gordon Russell	Lela Swift	Lara Parker	May 16, 1968	May 22, 1968	VOL8
493	"499"	Gordon Russell	Lela Swift	Nancy Barrett	May 21, 1968	May 23, 1968	VOL8
494	"500"	Sam Hall	Lela Swift	Grayson Hall	May 15, 1968	May 24, 1968	VOL8
495	"501"	Sam Hall	Lela Swift	Nancy Barrett	May 17, 1968	May 27, 1968	VOL8
496	"502"	Sam Hall	John Sedwick	Nancy Barrett	May 22, 1968	May 28, 1968	VOL8
497	"503"	Ron Sproat	John Sedwick	Grayson Hall	May 23, 1968	May 29, 1968	VOL8
498	"504"	Ron Sproat	Jack Sullivan	Alexandra Moltke	May 24, 1968	May 30, 1968	VOL8
499	"505"	Gordon Russell	Lela Swift	Nancy Barrett	May 30, 1968	May 31, 1968	VOL8
500	"506"	Gordon Russell	Jack Sullivan	Joan Bennett	May 31, 1968	June 3, 1968	VOL8
501	"507"	Sam Hall	Jack Sullivan	Grayson Hall	June 3, 1968	June 4, 1968	VOL8
502	"508"	Sam Hall	Lela Swift	Lara Parker	June 4, 1968	June 5, 1968	VOL8
503	"509"	Sam Hall	John Weaver	Alexandra Moltke	June 5, 1968	June 7, 1968	VOL8
504	"510"	Sam Hall	Lela Swift	Lara Parker	June 2, 1968	June 10, 1968	VOL8
505	"511"	Sam Hall	Jack Sullivan	Grayson Hall	June 9, 1968	June 11, 1968	VOL8
506	"512"	Gordon Russell	Lela Swift	Grayson Hall	June 10, 1968	June 12, 1968	VOL8
507	"513"	Gordon Russell	John Sedwick	Joan Bennett	May 29, 1968	June 13, 1968	VOL8
508	"514"	Gordon Russell	John Sedwick	Joan Bennett	May 27, 1968	June 14, 1968	VOL8
509	"515"	Ron Sproat	Lela Swift	Grayson Hall	June 1, 1968	June 17, 1968	VOL8
510	"516"	Ron Sproat	Lela Swift	Lara Parker	May 28, 1968	June 18, 1968	VOL8
511	"517"	Gordon Russell	Lela Swift	Alexandra Moltke	June 13, 1968	June 19, 1968	VOL8
512	"518"	Gordon Russell	Lela Swift	Kathryn Leigh Scott	June 12, 1968	June 20, 1968	VOL8
513	"519"	Sam Hall	John Sedwick	Alexandra Moltke	June 6, 1968	June 21, 1968	VOL8
514	"520"	Sam Hall	John Sedwick	Joan Bennett	June 7, 1968	June 24, 1968	VOL8
515	"521"	Sam Hall	Lela Swift	Grayson Hall	June 20, 1968	June 25, 1968	VOL8
516	"522"	Sam Hall	Lela Swift	Grayson Hall	June 16, 1968	June 26, 1968	VOL8
517	"523"	Gordon Russell	Lela Swift	Alexandra Moltke	June 17, 1968	June 27, 1968	VOL8
518	"524"	Gordon Russell	Lela Swift	Kathryn Leigh Scott	June 18, 1968	June 28, 1968	VOL8
519	"525"	Ron Sproat	Lela Swift	Alexandra Moltke	June 19, 1968	July 1, 1968	VOL8
520	"526"	Ron Sproat	Lela Swift	Alexandra Moltke	June 14, 1968	July 2, 1968	VOL8
521	"527"	Sam Hall	Jack Sullivan	Thayer David	June 21, 1968	July 3, 1968	VOL8
522	"528"	Sam Hall	Jack Sullivan	Lara Parker	June 25, 1968	July 4, 1968	VOL8
523	"529"	Ron Sproat	Jack Sullivan	Kathryn Leigh Scott	June 26, 1968	July 5, 1968	VOL8
524	"530"	Ron Sproat	Jack Sullivan	Lara Parker	June 24, 1968	July 8, 1968	VOL8
525	"531"	Gordon Russell	Jack Sullivan	Alexandra Moltke	June 23, 1968	July 9, 1968	VOL8
526	"532/533"	Gordon Russell	Lela Swift	Lara Parker	June 27, 1968	July 10, 1968	VOL8
527	"534"	Gordon Russell	John Weaver	Nancy Barrett	June 30, 1968	July 11, 1968	VOL9
528	"535"	Gordon Russell	Lela Swift	Lara Parker	June 28, 1968	July 12, 1968	VOL9
529	"536"	Sam Hall	John Weaver	Nancy Barrett	July 1, 1968	July 15, 1968	VOL9
530	"537"	Sam Hall	John Weaver	Lara Parker	July 2, 1968	July 16, 1968	VOL9
531	"538"	Sam Hall	Lela Swift	Lara Parker	July 5, 1968	July 17, 1968	VOL9
532	"539"	Ron Sproat	John Weaver	Alexandra Moltke	July 3, 1968	July 18, 1968	VOL9
533	"540"	Ron Sproat	John Weaver	John Karlen	July 4, 1968	July 19, 1968	VOL9
534	"541"	Ron Sproat	Lela Swift	Kathryn Leigh Scott	July 8, 1968	July 22, 1968	VOL9
535	"542"	Ron Sproat	Lela Swift	Nancy Barrett	July 9, 1968	July 23, 1968	VOL9
536	"543"	Ron Sproat	Lela Swift	Lara Parker	July 10, 1968	July 24, 1968	VOL9
537	"544"	Gordon Russell	Lela Swift	Grayson Hall	July 12, 1968	July 25, 1968	VOL9
538	"545"	Gordon Russell	Lela Swift	Nancy Barrett	July 11, 1968	July 26, 1968	VOL9
539	"546"	Sam Hall	Lela Swift	Louis Edmonds	July 15, 1968	July 29, 1968	VOL9
540	"547"	Sam Hall	Lela Swift	Alexandra Moltke	July 16, 1968	July 30, 1968	VOL9
541	"548"	Sam Hall	Lela Swift	Humbert Allen Astredo	July 17, 1968	July 31, 1968	VOL9
542	"549"	Sam Hall	Lela Swift	Nancy Barrett	July 18, 1968	August 1, 1968	VOL9
543	"550"	Sam Hall	Lela Swift	Alexandra Moltke	July 19, 1968	August 2, 1968	VOL9
544	"551"	Gordon Russell	Jack Sullivan	Nancy Barrett	July 22, 1968	August 5, 1968	VOL9
545	"552"	Gordon Russell	Jack Sullivan	Alexandra Moltke	July 23, 1968	August 6, 1968	VOL9
546	"553"	Gordon Russell	Sean Dhu Sullivan	Nancy Barrett	July 24, 1968	August 7, 1968	VOL9
547	"554"	Ron Sproat	Sean Dhu Sullivan	Grayson Hall	July 25, 1968	August 8, 1968	VOL9
548	"555"	Ron Sproat	Sean Dhu Sullivan	Nancy Barrett	July 26, 1968	August 9, 1968	VOL9
549	"556"	Ron Sproat	Sean Dhu Sullivan	Lara Parker	July 29, 1968	August 12, 1968	VOL9
550	"557"	Gordon Russell	Sean Dhu Sullivan	Grayson Hall	July 30, 1968	August 13, 1968	VOL9
551	"558"	Gordon Russell	Sean Dhu Sullivan	Lara Parker	July 31, 1968	August 14, 1968	VOL9
552	"559"	Gordon Russell	Sean Dhu Sullivan	Kathryn Leigh Scott	August 1, 1968	August 15, 1968	VOL9
553	"560"	Ron Sproat	Sean Dhu Sullivan	Lara Parker	August 2, 1968	August 16, 1968	VOL9
554	"561"	Ron Sproat	Sean Dhu Sullivan	Grayson Hall	August 5, 1968	August 19, 1968	VOL9
555	"562"	Ron Sproat	Sean Dhu Sullivan	Humbert Allen Astredo	August 6, 1968	August 20, 1968	VOL9
556	"563"	Sam Hall	Sean Dhu Sullivan	Kathryn Leigh Scott	August 14, 1968	August 21, 1968	VOL9
557	"564"	Sam Hall	Sean Dhu Sullivan	John Karlen	August 15, 1968	August 22, 1968	VOL9
558	"565"	Sam Hall	Sean Dhu Sullivan	Alexandra Moltke	August 16, 1968	August 23, 1968	VOL9
559	"566"	Gordon Russell	Sean Dhu Sullivan	John Karlen	August 19, 1968	August 26, 1968	VOL9
560	"567"	Gordon Russell	Sean Dhu Sullivan	Alexandra Moltke	August 20, 1968	August 27, 1968	VOL9
561	"568"	Ron Sproat	Lela Swift	Grayson Hall	August 21, 1968	August 28, 1968	VOL9
562	"569"	Ron Sproat	Lela Swift	Grayson Hall	August 22, 1968	August 29, 1968	VOL9
563	"570"	Sam Hall	Lela Swift	John Karlen	August 23, 1968	August 30, 1968	VOL9
564	"571"	Sam Hall	Lela Swift	Don Briscoe	August 26, 1968	September 2, 1968	VOL9
565	"572"	Ron Sproat	Lela Swift	Kathryn Leigh Scott	August 27, 1968	September 3, 1968	VOL9
566	"573"	Ron Sproat	Sean Dhu Sullivan	Kathryn Leigh Scott	August 28, 1968	September 4, 1968	VOL9
567	"574"	Gordon Russell	Sean Dhu Sullivan	Lara Parker	August 29, 1968	September 5, 1968	VOL10
568	"575"	Gordon Russell	Sean Dhu Sullivan	Alexandra Moltke	September 4, 1968	September 6, 1968	VOL10
569	"576"	Sam Hall	Lela Swift	Alexandra Moltke	September 5, 1968	September 9, 1968	VOL10
570	"577"	Sam Hall	Sean Dhu Sullivan	Nancy Barrett	August 31, 1968	September 10, 1968	VOL10
571	"578"	Ron Sproat	Sean Dhu Sullivan	Louis Edmonds	August 30, 1968	September 11, 1968	VOL10
572	"579"	Ron Sproat	Lela Swift	Alexandra Moltke	September 6, 1968	September 12, 1968	VOL10
573	"580"	Gordon Russell	John Sedwick	Grayson Hall	September 2, 1968	September 13, 1968	VOL10
574	"581"	Gordon Russell	Lela Swift	Nancy Barrett	September 9, 1968	September 16, 1968	VOL10
575	"582"	Sam Hall	Sean Dhu Sullivan	Grayson Hall	September 11, 1968	September 17, 1968	VOL10
576	"583"	Sam Hall	Lela Swift	Alexandra Moltke	September 10, 1968	September 18, 1968	VOL10
577	"584"	Gordon Russell	Sean Dhu Sullivan	Kathryn Leigh Scott	September 12, 1968	September 19, 1968	VOL10
578	"585"	Gordon Russell	Sean Dhu Sullivan	Alexandra Moltke	September 13, 1968	September 20, 1968	VOL10
579	"586"	Sam Hall	Sean Dhu Sullivan	Nancy Barrett	September 16, 1968	September 23, 1968	VOL10
580	"587"	Sam Hall	Sean Dhu Sullivan	Kathryn Leigh Scott	September 17, 1968	September 24, 1968	VOL10
581	"588"	Ron Sproat	Lela Swift	Nancy Barrett	September 18, 1968	September 25, 1968	VOL10
582	"589"	Ron Sproat	Lela Swift	Nancy Barrett	September 19, 1968	September 26, 1968	VOL10
583	"590"	Sam Hall	Lela Swift	John Karlen	September 20, 1968	September 27, 1968	VOL10
584	"591"	Sam Hall	Lela Swift	Nancy Barrett	September 23, 1968	September 30, 1968	VOL10
585	"592"	Sam Hall	Lela Swift	Nancy Barrett	September 24, 1968	October 1, 1968	VOL10
586	"593"	Gordon Russell	Sean Dhu Sullivan	Kathryn Leigh Scott	September 25, 1968	October 2, 1968	VOL10
587	"594"	Ron Sproat	Sean Dhu Sullivan	Humbert Allen Astredo	September 26, 1968	October 3, 1968	VOL10
588	"595"	Ron Sproat	Sean Dhu Sullivan	Grayson Hall	September 27, 1968	October 4, 1968	VOL10
589	"596"	Sam Hall	Sean Dhu Sullivan	Thayer David	September 30, 1968	October 7, 1968	VOL10
590	"597"	Sam Hall	Sean Dhu Sullivan	Grayson Hall	October 2, 1968	October 8, 1968	VOL10
591	"598"	Ron Sproat	Sean Dhu Sullivan	Kathryn Leigh Scott	October 1, 1968	October 9, 1968	VOL10
592	"599"	Ron Sproat	Lela Swift	Kathryn Leigh Scott	October 3, 1968	October 10, 1968	VOL10
593	"600"	Gordon Russell	Lela Swift	Marie Wallace	October 4, 1968	October 11, 1968	VOL10
594	"601"	Gordon Russell	Lela Swift	Nancy Barrett	October 7, 1968	October 14, 1968	VOL10
595	"602"	Sam Hall	Lela Swift	Marie Wallace	October 8, 1968	October 15, 1968	VOL10
596	"603"	Gordon Russell	Lela Swift	Alexandra Moltke	October 9, 1968	October 16, 1968	VOL10
597	"604"	Gordon Russell	Lela Swift	Grayson Hall	October 10, 1968	October 17, 1968	VOL10
598	"605"	Gordon Russell	Lela Swift	Lara Parker	October 11, 1968	October 18, 1968	VOL10
599	"606"	Ron Sproat	Sean Dhu Sullivan	Grayson Hall	October 14, 1968	October 21, 1968	VOL10
600	"607"	Ron Sproat	Sean Dhu Sullivan	Lara Parker	October 16, 1968	October 22, 1968	VOL10
601	"608"	Sam Hall	Sean Dhu Sullivan	Kathryn Leigh Scott	October 15, 1968	October 23, 1968	VOL10
602	"609"	Sam Hall	Sean Dhu Sullivan	Nancy Barrett	October 17, 1968	October 24, 1968	VOL10
603	"610"	Gordon Russell	Sean Dhu Sullivan	Joan Bennett	October 18, 1968	October 25, 1968	VOL10
604	"611"	Gordon Russell	Sean Dhu Sullivan	Kathryn Leigh Scott	October 21, 1968	October 28, 1968	VOL10
605	"612"	Ron Sproat	Sean Dhu Sullivan	Clarice Blackburn	October 22, 1968	October 29, 1968	VOL10
606	"613"	Ron Sproat	Sean Dhu Sullivan	Grayson Hall	October 23, 1968	October 30, 1968	VOL10
607	"614"	Sam Hall	Sean Dhu Sullivan	Joan Bennett	October 24, 1968	October 31, 1968	VOL11
608	"615"	Sam Hall	Sean Dhu Sullivan	Lara Parker	October 25, 1968	November 1, 1968	VOL11
609	"616"	Ron Sproat	Sean Dhu Sullivan	Kathryn Leigh Scott	October 28, 1968	November 4, 1968	VOL11
610	"617"	Ron Sproat	Sean Dhu Sullivan	Joan Bennett	October 29, 1968	November 5, 1968	VOL11
611	"618"	Gordon Russell	Sean Dhu Sullivan	Grayson Hall	October 30, 1968	November 6, 1968	VOL11
612	"619"	Gordon Russell	Sean Dhu Sullivan	Grayson Hall	October 31, 1968	November 7, 1968	VOL11
613	"620"	Sam Hall	Sean Dhu Sullivan	Alexandra Moltke	November 1, 1968	November 8, 1968	VOL11
614	"621"	Sam Hall	Lela Swift	Humbert Allen Astredo	November 4, 1968	November 11, 1968	VOL11
615	"622"	Gordon Russell	Lela Swift	Alexandra Moltke	November 5, 1968	November 12, 1968	VOL11
616	"623"	Gordon Russell	Lela Swift	Louis Edmonds	November 6, 1968	November 13, 1968	VOL11
617	"624"	Ron Sproat	Lela Swift	Alexandra Moltke	November 7, 1968	November 14, 1968	VOL11
618	"625"	Sam Hall	Lela Swift	Louis Edmonds	November 8, 1968	November 15, 1968	VOL11
619	"626"	Sam Hall	Lela Swift	Alexandra Moltke	November 11, 1968	November 18, 1968	VOL11
620	"627"	Gordon Russell	Lela Swift	Grayson Hall	November 12, 1968	November 19, 1968	VOL11
621	"628"	Ron Sproat	Lela Swift	Grayson Hall	November 13, 1968	November 20, 1968	VOL11
622	"629"	Gordon Russell	Lela Swift	Joan Bennett	November 14, 1968	November 21, 1968	VOL11
623	"630"	Sam Hall	Sean Dhu Sullivan	Kathryn Leigh Scott	November 19, 1968	November 22, 1968	VOL11
624	"631"	Gordon Russell	Sean Dhu Sullivan	Betsy Durkin	November 18, 1968	November 25, 1968	VOL11
625	"632"	Ron Sproat	Lela Swift	Kathryn Leigh Scott	November 15, 1968	November 26, 1968	VOL11
626	"633/634"	Sam Hall	Sean Dhu Sullivan	Grayson Hall	November 20, 1968	November 27, 1968	VOL11
627	"635"	Ron Sproat	Lela Swift	Nancy Barrett	November 21, 1968	November 29, 1968	VOL11
628	"636"	Sam Hall	Lela Swift	Thayer David	November 22, 1968	December 2, 1968	VOL11
629	"637"	Gordon Russell	Lela Swift	Grayson Hall	November 25, 1968	December 3, 1968	VOL11
630	"638"	Ron Sproat	Lela Swift	Grayson Hall	November 26, 1968	December 4, 1968	VOL11
631	"639"	Gordon Russell	Lela Swift	Grayson Hall	November 27, 1968	December 5, 1968	VOL11
632	"640"	Sam Hall	Lela Swift	Nancy Barrett	November 29, 1968	December 6, 1968	VOL11
633	"641"	Sam Hall	Penberry Jones	Joan Bennett	December 2, 1968	December 9, 1968	VOL11
634	"642"	Sam Hall	Penberry Jones	Nancy Barrett	December 3, 1968	December 10, 1968	VOL11
635	"643"	Ron Sproat	Penberry Jones	Louis Edmonds	December 4, 1968	December 11, 1968	VOL11
636	"644"	Ron Sproat	Penberry Jones	Joan Bennett	December 5, 1968	December 12, 1968	VOL11
637	"645"	Gordon Russell	Penberry Jones	Joan Bennett	December 6, 1968	December 13, 1968	VOL11
638	"646"	Gordon Russell	Lela Swift	Joan Bennett	December 9, 1968	December 16, 1968	VOL11
639	"647"	Sam Hall	Lela Swift	Cavada Humphrey	December 10, 1968	December 17, 1968	VOL11
640	"648"	Sam Hall	Lela Swift	Cavada Humphrey	December 11, 1968	December 18, 1968	VOL11
641	"649"	Ron Sproat	Lela Swift	Grayson Hall	December 12, 1968	December 19, 1968	VOL11
642	"650"	Ron Sproat	Lela Swift	Roger Davis	December 13, 1968	December 20, 1968	VOL11
643	"651"	Gordon Russell	Lela Swift	Grayson Hall	December 16, 1968	December 23, 1968	VOL11
644	"652/653"	Gordon Russell	Lela Swift	Kathryn Leigh Scott	December 17, 1968	December 24, 1968	VOL11
645	"654"	Sam Hall	Lela Swift	Grayson Hall	December 18, 1968	December 26, 1968	VOL11
646	"655"	Sam Hall	Henry Kaplan	Joan Bennett	December 19, 1968	December 27, 1968	VOL11
647	"656"	Ron Sproat	Henry Kaplan	Kathryn Leigh Scott	December 26, 1968	December 30, 1968	VOL12
648	"657"	Gordon Russell	Henry Kaplan	Don Briscoe	December 23, 1968	December 31, 1968	VOL12

== 1969 ==
#	Episode	Writer	Director	Narrator	Tape date	Original airdate	DVD volume
649	"658"	Gordon Russell	Henry Kaplan	Vince O'Brien	December 24, 1968	January 1, 1969	VOL12
650	"659"	Gordon Russell	Henry Kaplan	Nancy Barrett	December 26, 1968	January 2, 1969	VOL12
651	"660"	Sam Hall	Lela Swift	Thayer David	December 27, 1968	January 3, 1969	VOL12
652	"661"	Sam Hall & Gordon Russell	Dan Curtis	Grayson Hall	December 28, 1968	January 6, 1969	VOL12
653	"662"	Gordon Russell	Dan Curtis	Thayer David	December 30, 1968	January 7, 1969	VOL12
654	"663"	Gordon Russell	Dan Curtis	Thayer David	December 31, 1968	January 8, 1969	VOL12
655	"664"	Ron Sproat	Dan Curtis	Thayer David	January 2, 1969	January 9, 1969	VOL12
656	"665"	Ron Sproat	Dan Curtis	Thayer David	January 3, 1969	January 10, 1969	VOL12
657	"666"	Ron Sproat	Dan Curtis	Thayer David	January 7, 1969	January 13, 1969	VOL12
658	"667"	Ron Sproat	Dan Curtis	Nancy Barrett	January 6, 1969	January 14, 1969	VOL12
659	"668"	Ron Sproat	Dennis Kane	Nancy Barrett	January 8, 1969	January 15, 1969	VOL12
660	"669"	Gordon Russell	Dennis Kane	Clarice Blackburn	January 9, 1969	January 16, 1969	VOL12
661	"670"	Gordon Russell	Dennis Kane	Kathryn Leigh Scott	January 10, 1969	January 17, 1969	VOL12
662	"671"	Gordon Russell	Dennis Kane	Nancy Barrett	January 13, 1969	January 20, 1969	VOL12
663	"672"	Ron Sproat	Lela Swift	Grayson Hall	January 16, 1969	January 21, 1969	VOL12
664	"673"	Ron Sproat	Lela Swift	Grayson Hall	January 15, 1969	January 22, 1969	VOL12
665	"674"	Sam Hall	Dennis Kane	Grayson Hall	January 14, 1969	January 23, 1969	VOL12
666	"675"	Sam Hall	Lela Swift	Grayson Hall	January 17, 1969	January 24, 1969	VOL12
667	"676"	Gordon Russell	Lela Swift	Clarice Blackburn	January 20, 1969	January 27, 1969	VOL12
668	"677"	Gordon Russell	Lela Swift	Grayson Hall	January 21, 1969	January 28, 1969	VOL12
669	"678"	Sam Hall	Lela Swift	Don Briscoe	January 22, 1969	January 29, 1969	VOL12
670	"679"	Sam Hall	Lela Swift	Kathryn Leigh Scott	January 23, 1969	January 30, 1969	VOL12
671	"680"	Gordon Russell	Dan Curtis	Clarice Blackburn	January 24, 1969	January 31, 1969	VOL12
672	"681"	Gordon Russell	Dan Curtis	Nancy Barrett	January 27, 1969	February 3, 1969	VOL12
673	"682"	Ron Sproat	Dan Curtis	Thayer David	January 28, 1969	February 4, 1969	VOL12
674	"683"	Ron Sproat	Lela Swift	Don Briscoe	January 29, 1969	February 5, 1969	VOL12
675	"684"	Sam Hall	Lela Swift	Nancy Barrett	January 30, 1969	February 6, 1969	VOL12
676	"685"	Sam Hall	Lela Swift	Joan Bennett	January 31, 1969	February 7, 1969	VOL12
677	"686"	Sam Hall	Lela Swift	Joan Bennett	February 3, 1969	February 10, 1969	VOL12
678	"687"	Gordon Russell	Lela Swift	Nancy Barrett	February 4, 1969	February 11, 1969	VOL12
679	"688"	Gordon Russell	Henry Kaplan	Kathryn Leigh Scott	February 5, 1969	February 12, 1969	VOL12
680	"689"	Gordon Russell	Henry Kaplan	Kathryn Leigh Scott	February 6, 1969	February 13, 1969	VOL12
681	"690"	Ralph Ellis	Henry Kaplan	Don Briscoe	February 7, 1969	February 14, 1969	VOL12
682	"691"	Ralph Ellis	Henry Kaplan	Clarice Blackburn	February 11, 1969	February 17, 1969	VOL12
683	"692"	Gordon Russell	Lela Swift	Don Briscoe	February 12, 1969	February 18, 1969	VOL12
684	"693"	Gordon Russell	Lela Swift	Nancy Barrett	February 13, 1969	February 19, 1969	VOL12
685	"694"	Sam Hall	Lela Swift	Joan Bennett	February 14, 1969	February 20, 1969	VOL12
686	"695"	Sam Hall	Lela Swift	Kathryn Leigh Scott	February 15, 1969	February 21, 1969	VOL12
687	"696"	Sam Hall	Lela Swift	John Karlen	February 17, 1969	February 24, 1969	VOL13
688	"697"	Sam Hall	Lela Swift	Louis Edmonds	February 18, 1969	February 25, 1969	VOL13
689	"698"	Sam Hall	Henry Kaplan	Grayson Hall	February 19, 1969	February 26, 1969	VOL13
690	"699"	Gordon Russell	Henry Kaplan	Kathryn Leigh Scott	February 20, 1969	February 27, 1969	VOL13
691	"700"	Gordon Russell	Henry Kaplan	Thayer David	February 21, 1969	February 28, 1969	VOL13
692	"701"	Sam Hall	Henry Kaplan	Thayer David	February 24, 1969	March 3, 1969	VOL13
693	"702"	Sam Hall	Henry Kaplan	Grayson Hall	February 25, 1969	March 4, 1969	VOL13
694	"703"	Gordon Russell	Henry Kaplan	Joan Bennett	February 26, 1969	March 5, 1969	VOL13
695	"704"	Gordon Russell	Lela Swift	Joan Bennett	February 27, 1969	March 6, 1969	VOL13
696	"705"	Gordon Russell	Lela Swift	Joan Bennett	February 28, 1969	March 7, 1969	VOL13
697	"706"	Sam Hall	Henry Kaplan	Grayson Hall	March 5, 1969	March 10, 1969	VOL13
698	"707"	Gordon Russell	Lela Swift	Kathryn Leigh Scott	March 4, 1969	March 11, 1969	VOL13
699	"708"	Sam Hall	Lela Swift	Grayson Hall	March 3, 1969	March 12, 1969	VOL13
700	"709"	Sam Hall	Henry Kaplan	Kathryn Leigh Scott	March 6, 1969	March 13, 1969	VOL13
701	"710"	Gordon Russell	Henry Kaplan	Thayer David	March 11, 1969	March 14, 1969	VOL13
702	"711"	Violet Welles	Henry Kaplan	Kathryn Leigh Scott	March 10, 1969	March 17, 1969	VOL13
703	"712"	Gordon Russell	Henry Kaplan	Roger Davis	March 7, 1969	March 18, 1969	VOL13
704	"713"	Gordon Russell	Lela Swift	Grayson Hall	March 12, 1969	March 19, 1969	VOL13
705	"714"	Gordon Russell	Lela Swift	Kathryn Leigh Scott	March 13, 1969	March 20, 1969	VOL13
706	"715"	Sam Hall	Lela Swift	Grayson Hall	March 14, 1969	March 21, 1969	VOL13
707	"716"	Sam Hall	Lela Swift	Joan Bennett	March 17, 1969	March 24, 1969	VOL13
708	"717"	Violet Welles	Lela Swift	Kathryn Leigh Scott	March 18, 1969	March 25, 1969	VOL13
709	"718"	Sam Hall	Henry Kaplan	Grayson Hall	March 19, 1969	March 26, 1969	VOL13
710	"719"	Sam Hall	Henry Kaplan	Joan Bennett	March 20, 1969	March 27, 1969	VOL13
711	"720"	Gordon Russell	Henry Kaplan	Marie Wallace	March 24, 1969	March 28, 1969	VOL13
712	"721"	Gordon Russell	Henry Kaplan	Lara Parker	March 21, 1969	March 31, 1969	VOL13
713	"722"	Violet Welles	Henry Kaplan	Kathryn Leigh Scott	March 25, 1969	April 1, 1969	VOL13
714	"723"	Violet Welles	Lela Swift	Joan Bennett	March 26, 1969	April 2, 1969	VOL13
715	"724"	Sam Hall	Lela Swift	Thayer David	March 27, 1969	April 3, 1969	VOL13
716	"725"	Sam Hall	Lela Swift	David Selby	March 28, 1969	April 4, 1969	VOL13
717	"726"	Sam Hall	Lela Swift	David Selby	March 31, 1969	April 7, 1969	VOL13
718	"727"	Sam Hall	Lela Swift	Nancy Barrett	April 1, 1969	April 8, 1969	VOL13
719	"728"	Gordon Russell	Henry Kaplan	David Selby	April 2, 1969	April 9, 1969	VOL13
720	"729"	Gordon Russell	Henry Kaplan	David Selby	April 3, 1969	April 10, 1969	VOL13
721	"730"	Gordon Russell	Henry Kaplan	Louis Edmonds	April 4, 1969	April 11, 1969	VOL13
722	"731"	Gordon Russell	Henry Kaplan	Louis Edmonds	April 7, 1969	April 14, 1969	VOL13
723	"732"	Violet Welles	Henry Kaplan	Kathryn Leigh Scott	April 8, 1969	April 15, 1969	VOL13
724	"733"	Violet Welles	Lela Swift	Grayson Hall	April 9, 1969	April 16, 1969	VOL13
725	"734"	Sam Hall	Lela Swift	Don Briscoe	April 10, 1969	April 17, 1969	VOL13
726	"735"	Sam Hall	Dan Curtis	Jerry Lacy	April 11, 1969	April 18, 1969	VOL13
727	"736"	Gordon Russell	Dan Curtis	Don Briscoe	April 14, 1969	April 21, 1969	VOL14
728	"737"	Gordon Russell	Dan Curtis	Roger Davis	April 15, 1969	April 22, 1969	VOL14
729	"738"	Violet Welles	Henry Kaplan	Nancy Barrett	April 16, 1969	April 23, 1969	VOL14
730	"739"	Violet Welles	Henry Kaplan	Joan Bennett	April 17, 1969	April 24, 1969	VOL14
731	"740"	Sam Hall	Henry Kaplan	Thayer David	April 18, 1969	April 25, 1969	VOL14
732	"741"	Sam Hall	Henry Kaplan	David Selby	April 21, 1969	April 28, 1969	VOL14
733	"742"	Gordon Russell	Henry Kaplan	Nancy Barrett	April 22, 1969	April 29, 1969	VOL14
734	"743"	Gordon Russell	Lela Swift	Roger Davis	April 23, 1969	April 30, 1969	VOL14
735	"744"	Violet Welles	Lela Swift	Joan Bennett	April 24, 1969	May 1, 1969	VOL14
736	"745"	Sam Hall	Lela Swift	Grayson Hall	April 25, 1969	May 2, 1969	VOL14
737	"746"	Sam Hall	Lela Swift	Grayson Hall	April 28, 1969	May 5, 1969	VOL14
738	"747"	Sam Hall	Lela Swift	David Selby	April 29, 1969	May 6, 1969	VOL14
739	"748"	Gordon Russell	Henry Kaplan	Grayson Hall	April 30, 1969	May 7, 1969	VOL14
740	"749"	Gordon Russell	Henry Kaplan	Louis Edmonds	May 1, 1969	May 8, 1969	VOL14
741	"750"	Gordon Russell	Henry Kaplan	Terry Crawford	May 2, 1969	May 9, 1969	VOL14
742	"751"	Violet Welles	Henry Kaplan	Kathryn Leigh Scott	May 6, 1969	May 12, 1969	VOL14
743	"752"	Violet Welles	Henry Kaplan	Grayson Hall	May 5, 1969	May 13, 1969	VOL14
744	"753"	Gordon Russell	Lela Swift	Nancy Barrett	May 7, 1969	May 14, 1969	VOL14
745	"754"	Sam Hall	Lela Swift	Terry Crawford	May 8, 1969	May 15, 1969	VOL14
746	"755"	Sam Hall	Lela Swift	Diana Millay	May 9, 1969	May 16, 1969	VOL14
747	"756"	Violet Welles	Henry Kaplan	Nancy Barrett	May 12, 1969	May 19, 1969	VOL14
748	"757"	Violet Welles	Henry Kaplan	Grayson Hall	May 13, 1969	May 20, 1969	VOL14
749	"758"	Sam Hall	Henry Kaplan	Joan Bennett	May 14, 1969	May 21, 1969	VOL14
750	"759"	Sam Hall	Henry Kaplan	Grayson Hall	May 15, 1969	May 22, 1969	VOL14
751	"760"	Gordon Russell	Henry Kaplan	Louis Edmonds	May 16, 1969	May 23, 1969	VOL14
752	"761"	Gordon Russell	Henry Kaplan	David Selby	May 19, 1969	May 26, 1969	VOL14
753	"762"	Violet Welles	Henry Kaplan	Clarice Blackburn	May 20, 1969	May 27, 1969	VOL14
754	"763"	Sam Hall	Henry Kaplan	Grayson Hall	May 21, 1969	May 28, 1969	VOL14
755	"764"	Sam Hall	Lela Swift	Joan Bennett	May 22, 1969	May 29, 1969	VOL14
756	"765"	Gordon Russell	Lela Swift	Grayson Hall	May 23, 1969	May 30, 1969	VOL14
757	"766"	Violet Welles	Lela Swift	Joan Bennett	May 26, 1969	June 2, 1969	VOL14
758	"767"	Violet Welles	Lela Swift	Nancy Barrett	May 27, 1969	June 3, 1969	VOL14
759	"768"	Violet Welles	Henry Kaplan	Joan Bennett	May 28, 1969	June 4, 1969	VOL14
760	"769"	Violet Welles	Henry Kaplan	Terry Crawford	May 29, 1969	June 5, 1969	VOL14
761	"770"	Gordon Russell	Henry Kaplan	Louis Edmonds	May 30, 1969	June 6, 1969	VOL14
762	"771"	Sam Hall	Henry Kaplan	Joan Bennett	June 2, 1969	June 9, 1969	VOL14
763	"772"	Sam Hall	Henry Kaplan	Clarice Blackburn	June 3, 1969	June 10, 1969	VOL14
764	"773"	Sam Hall	Lela Swift	Nancy Barrett	June 4, 1969	June 11, 1969	VOL14
765	"774"	Gordon Russell	Lela Swift	Joan Bennett	June 5, 1969	June 12, 1969	VOL14
766	"775"	Gordon Russell	Lela Swift	Louis Edmonds	June 6, 1969	June 13, 1969	VOL14
767	"776"	Violet Welles	Lela Swift	Louis Edmonds	June 9, 1969	June 16, 1969	VOL15
768	"777"	Violet Welles	Henry Kaplan	Kay Frye	June 12, 1969	June 17, 1969	VOL15
769	"778"	Violet Welles	Henry Kaplan	Grayson Hall	June 11, 1969	June 18, 1969	VOL15
770	"779"	Sam Hall	Lela Swift	Lara Parker	June 10, 1969	June 19, 1969	VOL15
771	"780"	Sam Hall	Henry Kaplan	David Selby	June 13, 1969	June 20, 1969	VOL15
772	"781"	Gordon Russell	Henry Kaplan	Nancy Barrett	June 16, 1969	June 23, 1969	VOL15
773	"782"	Gordon Russell	Henry Kaplan	Jerry Lacy	June 17, 1969	June 24, 1969	VOL15
774	"783"	Sam Hall	Lela Swift	Grayson Hall	June 18, 1969	June 25, 1969	VOL15
775	"784"	Sam Hall	Lela Swift	Grayson Hall	June 19, 1969	June 26, 1969	VOL15
776	"785"	Sam Hall	Lela Swift	Joan Bennett	June 20, 1969	June 27, 1969	VOL15
777	"786"	Gordon Russell	Lela Swift	Nancy Barrett	June 23, 1969	June 30, 1969	VOL15
778	"787"	Gordon Russell	Lela Swift	Grayson Hall	June 24, 1969	July 1, 1969	VOL15
779	"788"	Gordon Russell	Henry Kaplan	Grayson Hall	June 25, 1969	July 2, 1969	VOL15
780	"789"	Gordon Russell	Henry Kaplan	Clarice Blackburn	June 26, 1969	July 3, 1969	VOL15
781	"790"	Violet Welles	Henry Kaplan	Clarice Blackburn	June 27, 1969	July 4, 1969	VOL15
782	"791"	Violet Welles	Lela Swift	Humbert Allen Astredo	June 30, 1969	July 7, 1969	VOL15
783	"792"	Violet Welles	Lela Swift	Lara Parker	July 2, 1969	July 8, 1969	VOL15
784	"793"	Gordon Russell	Lela Swift	Louis Edmonds	July 1, 1969	July 9, 1969	VOL15
785	"794"	Gordon Russell	Lela Swift	Thayer David	July 3, 1969	July 10, 1969	VOL15
786	"795"	Gordon Russell	Lela Swift	Lara Parker	July 4, 1969	July 11, 1969	VOL15
787	"796"	Sam Hall	Henry Kaplan	David Selby	July 7, 1969	July 14, 1969	VOL15
788	"797"	Sam Hall	Henry Kaplan	Terry Crawford	July 8, 1969	July 15, 1969	VOL15
789	"798"	Sam Hall	Henry Kaplan	David Selby	July 9, 1969	July 16, 1969	VOL15
790	"799"	Sam Hall	Henry Kaplan	Nancy Barrett	July 14, 1969	July 17, 1969	VOL15
791	"800"	Violet Welles	Henry Kaplan	Thayer David	July 10, 1969	July 18, 1969	VOL15
792	"801/802"	Sam Hall	Henry Kaplan	Humbert Allen Astredo	July 12, 1969	July 22, 1969	VOL15
793	"803"	Violet Welles	Henry Kaplan	Terry Crawford	July 15, 1969	July 23, 1969	VOL15
794	"804"	Violet Welles	Henry Kaplan	Nancy Barrett	July 16, 1969	July 24, 1969	VOL15
795	"805"	Violet Welles	Henry Kaplan	Nancy Barrett	July 17, 1969	July 25, 1969	VOL15
796	"806"	Gordon Russell	Dan Curtis	Roger Davis	July 18, 1969	July 28, 1969	VOL15
797	"807"	Gordon Russell	Dan Curtis	Jonathan Frid	July 25, 1969	July 29, 1969	VOL15
798	"808"	Sam Hall	Henry Kaplan	Nancy Barrett	July 22, 1969	July 30, 1969	VOL15
799	"809"	Sam Hall	Henry Kaplan	Jerry Lacy	July 23, 1969	July 31, 1969	VOL15
800	"810"	Violet Welles	Henry Kaplan	Grayson Hall	July 24, 1969	August 1, 1969	VOL15
801	"811"	Violet Welles	Dan Curtis	Jerry Lacy	July 21, 1969	August 4, 1969	VOL15
802	"812"	Gordon Russell	Henry Kaplan	Jerry Lacy	July 28, 1969	August 5, 1969	VOL15
803	"813"	Gordon Russell	Henry Kaplan	Michael Stroka	July 29, 1969	August 6, 1969	VOL15
804	"814"	Sam Hall	Lela Swift	David Selby	July 30, 1969	August 7, 1969	VOL15
805	"815"	Sam Hall	Lela Swift	Grayson Hall	July 31, 1969	August 8, 1969	VOL15
806	"816"	Violet Welles	Lela Swift	David Selby	August 4, 1969	August 11, 1969	VOL15
807	"817"	Violet Welles	Lela Swift	Terry Crawford	August 5, 1969	August 12, 1969	VOL16
808	"818"	Violet Welles	Lela Swift	Nancy Barrett	August 6, 1969	August 14, 1969	VOL16
809	"819"	Gordon Russell	Lela Swift	Grayson Hall	August 7, 1969	August 15, 1969	VOL16
810	"820"	Gordon Russell	Lela Swift	Don Briscoe	August 8, 1969	August 18, 1969	VOL16
811	"821"	Violet Welles	Lela Swift	Jonathan Frid	August 11, 1969	August 19, 1969	VOL16
812	"822"	Sam Hall	Lela Swift	Jerry Lacy	August 12, 1969	August 20, 1969	VOL16
813	"823/824"	Violet Welles	Lela Swift	Thayer David	August 13, 1969	August 21, 1969	VOL16
814	"825"	Sam Hall	Lela Swift	Thayer David	August 14, 1969	August 22, 1969	VOL16
815	"826"	Violet Welles	Lela Swift	Thayer David	August 15, 1969	August 25, 1969	VOL16
816	"827"	Violet Welles	Lela Swift	Jonathan Frid	August 18, 1969	August 26, 1969	VOL16
817	"828"	Violet Welles	Lela Swift	Lara Parker	August 19, 1969	August 27, 1969	VOL16
818	"829"	Gordon Russell	Henry Kaplan	Nancy Barrett	August 20, 1969	August 28, 1969	VOL16
819	"830"	Gordon Russell	Henry Kaplan	Jerry Lacy	August 21, 1969	August 29, 1969	VOL16
820	"831"	Violet Welles	Henry Kaplan	Lara Parker	August 22, 1969	September 1, 1969	VOL16
821	"832"	Sam Hall	Henry Kaplan	Thayer David	August 25, 1969	September 2, 1969	VOL16
822	"833"	Sam Hall	Henry Kaplan	Nancy Barrett	August 26, 1969	September 3, 1969	VOL16
823	"834"	Sam Hall	Lela Swift	Louis Edmonds	August 27, 1969	September 4, 1969	VOL16
824	"835"	Gordon Russell	Lela Swift	Grayson Hall	August 28, 1969	September 5, 1969	VOL16
825	"836"	Gordon Russell	Lela Swift	Lara Parker	August 29, 1969	September 8, 1969	VOL16
826	"837"	Violet Welles	Lela Swift	Louis Edmonds	September 1, 1969	September 9, 1969	VOL16
827	"838"	Gordon Russell	Lela Swift	Lara Parker	September 2, 1969	September 10, 1969	VOL16
828	"839"	Sam Hall	Henry Kaplan	Grayson Hall	September 3, 1969	September 11, 1969	VOL16
829	"840"	Sam Hall	Henry Kaplan	David Selby	September 4, 1969	September 12, 1969	VOL16
830	"841"	Gordon Russell	Henry Kaplan	Terry Crawford	September 5, 1969	September 15, 1969	VOL16
831	"842"	Gordon Russell	Henry Kaplan	Lara Parker	September 8, 1969	September 16, 1969	VOL16
832	"843"	Violet Welles	Henry Kaplan	Thayer David	September 9, 1969	September 17, 1969	VOL16
833	"844"	Violet Welles	Lela Swift	Thayer David	September 10, 1969	September 18, 1969	VOL16
834	"845"	Sam Hall	Lela Swift	Nancy Barrett	September 11, 1969	September 19, 1969	VOL16
835	"846"	Sam Hall	Lela Swift	Louis Edmonds	September 12, 1969	September 22, 1969	VOL16
836	"847"	Gordon Russell	Lela Swift	Grayson Hall	September 16, 1969	September 23, 1969	VOL16
837	"848"	Gordon Russell	Lela Swift	Roger Davis	September 15, 1969	September 24, 1969	VOL16
838	"849"	Sam Hall	Lela Swift	Grayson Hall	September 14, 1969	September 25, 1969	VOL16
839	"850"	Sam Hall	Henry Kaplan	Roger Davis	September 18, 1969	September 26, 1969	VOL16
840	"851"	Violet Welles	Henry Kaplan	Roger Davis	September 17, 1969	September 29, 1969	VOL16
841	"852"	Violet Welles	Henry Kaplan	Kathryn Leigh Scott	September 19, 1969	September 30, 1969	VOL16
842	"853"	Sam Hall	Henry Kaplan	Thayer David	September 21, 1969	October 1, 1969	VOL16
843	"854"	Sam Hall	Henry Kaplan	Kathryn Leigh Scott	September 22, 1969	October 2, 1969	VOL16
844	"855"	Gordon Russell	Lela Swift	Nancy Barrett	September 23, 1969	October 3, 1969	VOL16
845	"856"	Gordon Russell	Lela Swift	Grayson Hall	September 24, 1969	October 6, 1969	VOL16
846	"857"	Violet Welles	Lela Swift	Louis Edmonds	September 25, 1969	October 7, 1969	VOL16
847	"858"	Violet Welles	Lela Swift	Lara Parker	September 26, 1969	October 8, 1969	VOL17
848	"859"	Sam Hall	Henry Kaplan	Louis Edmonds	September 28, 1969	October 9, 1969	VOL17
849	"860"	Sam Hall	Henry Kaplan	Nancy Barrett	September 29, 1969	October 10, 1969	VOL17
850	"861"	Gordon Russell	Lela Swift	Joan Bennett	October 2, 1969	October 13, 1969	VOL17
851	"862"	Gordon Russell	Lela Swift	Joan Bennett	October 3, 1969	October 14, 1969	VOL17
852	"863"	Sam Hall	Henry Kaplan	Louis Edmonds	October 5, 1969	October 15, 1969	VOL17
853	"864"	Sam Hall	Henry Kaplan	Lara Parker	September 30, 1969	October 16, 1969	VOL17
854	"865"	Gordon Russell	Henry Kaplan	Thayer David	October 11, 1969	October 17, 1969	VOL17
855	"866"	Gordon Russell	Henry Kaplan	Nancy Barrett	October 6, 1969	October 20, 1969	VOL17
856	"867"	Violet Welles	Henry Kaplan	Lara Parker	October 7, 1969	October 21, 1969	VOL17
857	"868"	Violet Welles	Lela Swift	Louis Edmonds	October 8, 1969	October 22, 1969	VOL17
858	"869"	Gordon Russell	Lela Swift	Nancy Barrett	October 9, 1969	October 23, 1969	VOL17
859	"870"	Gordon Russell	Lela Swift	Kathryn Leigh Scott	October 10, 1969	October 24, 1969	VOL17
860	"871"	Violet Welles	Henry Kaplan	Lara Parker	October 12, 1969	October 27, 1969	VOL17
861	"872"	Sam Hall	Henry Kaplan	Nancy Barrett	October 13, 1969	October 28, 1969	VOL17
862	"873"	Sam Hall	Henry Kaplan	Nancy Barrett	October 14, 1969	October 29, 1969	VOL17
863	"874"	Sam Hall	Lela Swift	Nancy Barrett	October 15, 1969	October 30, 1969	VOL17
864	"875"	Gordon Russell	Henry Kaplan	Thayer David	October 20, 1969	October 31, 1969	VOL17
865	"876"	Gordon Russell	Henry Kaplan	Thayer David	October 21, 1969	November 3, 1969	VOL17
866	"877"	Gordon Russell	Henry Kaplan	Michael Stroka	October 24, 1969	November 4, 1969	VOL17
867	"878"	Gordon Russell	Henry Kaplan	Joan Bennett	October 26, 1969	November 5, 1969	VOL17
868	"879"	Sam Hall	Lela Swift	Joan Bennett	October 17, 1969	November 6, 1969	VOL17
869	"880"	Sam Hall	Lela Swift	David Selby	October 16, 1969	November 7, 1969	VOL17
870	"881"	Violet Welles	Lela Swift	Nancy Barrett	October 22, 1969	November 10, 1969	VOL17
871	"882"	Violet Welles	Henry Kaplan	Lara Parker	October 19, 1969	November 11, 1969	VOL17
872	"883"	Violet Welles	Lela Swift	Roger Davis	October 23, 1969	November 12, 1969	VOL17
873	"884"	Violet Welles	Henry Kaplan	Joan Bennett	October 27, 1969	November 13, 1969	VOL17
874	"885"	Sam Hall	Henry Kaplan	Grayson Hall	October 28, 1969	November 14, 1969	VOL17
875	"886"	Sam Hall	Lela Swift	Nancy Barrett	October 29, 1969	November 17, 1969	VOL17
876	"887"	Gordon Russell	Lela Swift	Nancy Barrett	October 30, 1969	November 18, 1969	VOL17
877	"888"	Gordon Russell	Lela Swift	Nancy Barrett	October 31, 1969	November 19, 1969	VOL17
878	"889"	Gordon Russell	Lela Swift	Nancy Barrett	November 7, 1969	November 20, 1969	VOL17
879	"890"	Sam Hall	Lela Swift	Nancy Barrett	November 6, 1969	November 21, 1969	VOL17
880	"891"	Sam Hall	Lela Swift	Marie Wallace	November 5, 1969	November 25, 1969	VOL17
881	"892"	Violet Welles	Henry Kaplan	Kathryn Leigh Scott	November 4, 1969	November 26, 1969	VOL17
882	"893"	Violet Welles	Henry Kaplan	Marie Wallace	November 3, 1969	November 28, 1969	VOL17
883	"894/895"	Violet Welles	Lela Swift	Joan Bennett	November 12, 1969	December 1, 1969	VOL17
884	"896"	Violet Welles	Lela Swift	Grayson Hall	November 17, 1969	December 2, 1969	VOL17
885	"897"	Gordon Russell	Lela Swift	Nancy Barrett	November 13, 1969	December 3, 1969	VOL17
886	"898"	Gordon Russell	Lela Swift	Grayson Hall	November 14, 1969	December 4, 1969	VOL17
887	"899"	Sam Hall	Henry Kaplan	Nancy Barrett	November 10, 1969	December 5, 1969	VOL18
888	"900"	Sam Hall	Henry Kaplan	Grayson Hall	November 11, 1969	December 8, 1969	VOL18
889	"901"	Sam Hall	Henry Kaplan	Marie Wallace	November 20, 1969	December 9, 1969	VOL18
890	"902"	Sam Hall	Henry Kaplan	Dennis Patrick	November 19, 1969	December 10, 1969	VOL18
891	"903"	Violet Welles	Lela Swift	Grayson Hall	November 8, 1969	December 11, 1969	VOL18
892	"904"	Violet Welles	Henry Kaplan	Jonathan Frid	November 25, 1969	December 12, 1969	VOL18
893	"905"	Gordon Russell	Henry Kaplan	Grayson Hall	November 24, 1969	December 15, 1969	VOL18
894	"906"	Gordon Russell	Henry Kaplan	Dennis Patrick	November 21, 1969	December 16, 1969	VOL18
895	"907"	Sam Hall	Lela Swift	Grayson Hall	November 26, 1969	December 17, 1969	VOL18
896	"908"	Sam Hall	Lela Swift	Kathryn Leigh Scott	November 28, 1969	December 18, 1969	VOL18
897	"909"	Violet Welles	Lela Swift	Grayson Hall	December 1, 1969	December 19, 1969	VOL18
898	"910"	Gordon Russell	Lela Swift	Thayer David	December 2, 1969	December 22, 1969	VOL18
899	"911"	Sam Hall	Henry Kaplan	Joan Bennett	December 4, 1969	December 23, 1969	VOL18
900	"912"	Sam Hall	Henry Kaplan	Grayson Hall	December 5, 1969	December 24, 1969	VOL18
901	"913/914"	Gordon Russell	Henry Kaplan	Joan Bennett	December 3, 1969	December 26, 1969	VOL18
902	"915"	Violet Welles	Lela Swift	Marie Wallace	December 24, 1969	December 29, 1969	VOL18
903	"916"	Gordon Russell	Henry Kaplan	David Selby	December 8, 1969	December 30, 1969	VOL18
904	"917"	Violet Welles	Lela Swift	Clarice Blackburn	December 11, 1969	December 31, 1969	VOL18

== 1970 ==
#	Episode	Writer	Director	Narrator	Tape date	Original airdate	DVD volume
905	"918"	Violet Welles	Henry Kaplan	David Selby	December 9, 1969	January 2, 1970	VOL18
906	"919/920/921"	Violet Welles	Lela Swift	Nancy Barrett	December 10, 1969	January 5, 1970	VOL18
907	"922"	Violet Welles	Lela Swift	Grayson Hall	December 12, 1969	January 6, 1970	VOL18
908	"923"	Sam Hall	Lela Swift	Grayson Hall	December 15, 1969	January 7, 1970	VOL18
909	"924"	Sam Hall	Lela Swift	Kathryn Leigh Scott	December 16, 1969	January 8, 1970	VOL18
910	"925"	Gordon Russell	Henry Kaplan	Louis Edmonds	December 17, 1969	January 9, 1970	VOL18
911	"926"	Gordon Russell	Henry Kaplan	Marie Wallace	December 18, 1969	January 12, 1970	VOL18
912	"927"	Violet Welles	Henry Kaplan	Grayson Hall	December 19, 1969	January 13, 1970	VOL18
913	"928"	Violet Welles	Henry Kaplan	Thayer David	December 31, 1969	January 14, 1970	VOL18
914	"929"	Gordon Russell	Henry Kaplan	Nancy Barrett	December 22, 1969	January 15, 1970	VOL18
915	"930"	Gordon Russell	Lela Swift	Grayson Hall	December 29, 1969	January 16, 1970	VOL18
916	"931"	Sam Hall	Henry Kaplan	David Selby	December 23, 1969	January 19, 1970	VOL18
917	"932"	Sam Hall	Lela Swift	Emory Bass	December 30, 1969	January 20, 1970	VOL18
918	"933"	Violet Welles	Henry Kaplan	Grayson Hall	January 2, 1970	January 21, 1970	VOL18
919	"934"	Violet Welles	Henry Kaplan	Grayson Hall	January 5, 1970	January 22, 1970	VOL18
920	"935"	Violet Welles	Henry Kaplan	David Selby	January 6, 1970	January 23, 1970	VOL18
921	"936"	Sam Hall	Lela Swift	Joan Bennett	January 7, 1970	January 26, 1970	VOL18
922	"937"	Sam Hall	Lela Swift	Grayson Hall	January 8, 1970	January 27, 1970	VOL18
923	"938"	Gordon Russell	Lela Swift	Peter Lombard	January 9, 1970	January 28, 1970	VOL18
924	"939"	Gordon Russell	Lela Swift	Kathryn Leigh Scott	January 13, 1970	January 29, 1970	VOL18
925	"940"	Gordon Russell	Lela Swift	Lara Parker	January 12, 1970	January 30, 1970	VOL18
926	"941"	Sam Hall	Henry Kaplan	Kathryn Leigh Scott	January 14, 1970	February 2, 1970	VOL18
927	"942"	Violet Welles	Henry Kaplan	Ed Riley	January 15, 1970	February 3, 1970	VOL19
928	"943"	Sam Hall	Henry Kaplan	Grayson Hall	January 16, 1970	February 4, 1970	VOL19
929	"944"	Violet Welles	Henry Kaplan	Lara Parker	January 19, 1970	February 5, 1970	VOL19
930	"945"	Gordon Russell	Henry Kaplan	Joan Bennett	January 20, 1970	February 6, 1970	VOL19
931	"946"	Gordon Russell	Lela Swift	Michael Stroka	January 21, 1970	February 9, 1970	VOL19
932	"947"	Gordon Russell	Lela Swift	Lara Parker	January 22, 1970	February 10, 1970	VOL19
933	"948"	Violet Welles	Lela Swift	Nancy Barrett	January 23, 1970	February 11, 1970	VOL19
934	"949"	Violet Welles	Lela Swift	Nancy Barrett	January 26, 1970	February 12, 1970	VOL19
935	"950"	Sam Hall	Lela Swift	Jonathan Frid	January 27, 1970	February 13, 1970	VOL19
936	"951"	Sam Hall	Henry Kaplan	Grayson Hall	January 28, 1970	February 16, 1970	VOL19
937	"952"	Violet Welles	Henry Kaplan	Grayson Hall	January 29, 1970	February 17, 1970	VOL19
938	"953"	Sam Hall	Henry Kaplan	Nancy Barrett	February 3, 1970	February 18, 1970	VOL19
939	"954"	Gordon Russell	Henry Kaplan	Lara Parker	February 2, 1970	February 19, 1970	VOL19
940	"955"	Gordon Russell	Henry Kaplan	Kathryn Leigh Scott	January 30, 1970	February 20, 1970	VOL19
941	"956"	Sam Hall	Henry Kaplan	John Karlen	February 4, 1970	February 23, 1970	VOL19
942	"957"	Sam Hall	Henry Kaplan	Grayson Hall	February 5, 1970	February 24, 1970	VOL19
943	"958"	Violet Welles	Lela Swift	Louis Edmonds	February 13, 1970	February 25, 1970	VOL19
944	"959"	Gordon Russell	Lela Swift	Nancy Barrett	February 6, 1970	February 26, 1970	VOL19
945	"960"	Gordon Russell	Lela Swift	Louis Edmonds	February 10, 1970	February 27, 1970	VOL19
946	"961"	Gordon Russell	Lela Swift	Marie Wallace	February 9, 1970	March 2, 1970	VOL19
947	"962"	Violet Welles	Lela Swift	Nancy Barrett	February 12, 1970	March 3, 1970	VOL19
948	"963"	Sam Hall	Lela Swift	Grayson Hall	February 11, 1970	March 4, 1970	VOL19
949	"964"	Sam Hall	Lela Swift	David Selby	February 16, 1970	March 5, 1970	VOL19
950	"965"	Gordon Russell	Lela Swift	Kathryn Leigh Scott	February 17, 1970	March 6, 1970	VOL19
951	"966"	Gordon Russell	Lela Swift	Joan Bennett	February 18, 1970	March 9, 1970	VOL19
952	"967"	Violet Welles	Lela Swift	Christopher Bernau	February 19, 1970	March 10, 1970	VOL19
953	"968"	Violet Welles	Lela Swift	Joan Bennett	February 20, 1970	March 11, 1970	VOL19
954	"969"	Sam Hall	Henry Kaplan	Grayson Hall	February 23, 1970	March 12, 1970	VOL19
955	"970"	Sam Hall	Henry Kaplan	Louis Edmonds	February 24, 1970	March 13, 1970	VOL19
956	"971"	Violet Welles	Henry Kaplan	John Karlen	February 25, 1970	March 16, 1970	VOL19
957	"972"	Violet Welles	Lela Swift	Nancy Barrett	February 26, 1970	March 17, 1970	VOL19
958	"973"	Violet Welles	Lela Swift	Kathryn Leigh Scott	February 27, 1970	March 18, 1970	VOL19
959	"974"	Gordon Russell	Henry Kaplan	Don Briscoe	March 10, 1970	March 19, 1970	VOL19
960	"975"	Sam Hall	Lela Swift	Nancy Barrett	March 2, 1970	March 20, 1970	VOL19
961	"976"	Gordon Russell	Henry Kaplan	Louis Edmonds	March 9, 1970	March 23, 1970	VOL19
962	"977"	Violet Welles	Lela Swift	Grayson Hall	March 3, 1970	March 24, 1970	VOL19
963	"978"	Violet Welles	Lela Swift	Humbert Allen Astredo	March 11, 1970	March 25, 1970	VOL19
964	"979"	Sam Hall	Lela Swift	Louis Edmonds	March 12, 1970	March 26, 1970	VOL19
965	"980"	Gordon Russell	Henry Kaplan	Jonathan Frid	March 4, 1970	March 27, 1970	VOL19
966	"981"	Sam Hall	Henry Kaplan	Kathryn Leigh Scott	March 5, 1970	March 30, 1970	VOL19
967	"982"	Sam Hall	Henry Kaplan	Grayson Hall	March 6, 1970	March 31, 1970	VOL20
968	"983"	Gordon Russell	Lela Swift	Don Briscoe	March 13, 1970	April 1, 1970	VOL20
969	"984"	Gordon Russell	Lela Swift	Grayson Hall	March 16, 1970	April 2, 1970	VOL20
970	"985"	Violet Welles	Lela Swift	Grayson Hall	March 17, 1970	April 3, 1970	VOL20
971	"986"	Joe Caldwell	Henry Kaplan	Michael Stroka	March 18, 1970	April 6, 1970	VOL20
972	"987"	Joe Caldwell	Henry Kaplan	Christopher Pennock	March 19, 1970	April 7, 1970	VOL20
973	"988"	Gordon Russell	Henry Kaplan	John Harkins	March 20, 1970	April 8, 1970	VOL20
974	"989"	Gordon Russell	Henry Kaplan	Nancy Barrett	March 24, 1970	April 9, 1970	VOL20
975	"990"	Sam Hall	Lela Swift	David Selby	March 27, 1970	April 10, 1970	VOL20
976	"991"	Sam Hall	Lela Swift	David Selby	March 25, 1970	April 13, 1970	VOL20
977	"992"	Joe Caldwell	Lela Swift	Michael Stroka	March 26, 1970	April 14, 1970	VOL20
978	"993"	Joe Caldwell	Henry Kaplan	Paula Laurence	March 23, 1970	April 15, 1970	VOL20
979	"994"	Joe Caldwell	Lela Swift	Michael Stroka	March 30, 1970	April 16, 1970	VOL20
980	"995"	Joe Caldwell	Lela Swift	Lisa Richards	March 31, 1970	April 17, 1970	VOL20
981	"996"	Joe Caldwell	Lela Swift	Lara Parker	April 13, 1970	April 20, 1970	VOL20
982	"997"	Sam Hall	Lela Swift	Lisa Richards	April 14, 1970	April 21, 1970	VOL20
983	"998"	Gordon Russell	Henry Kaplan	Lisa Richards	April 15, 1970	April 22, 1970	VOL20
984	"999"	Sam Hall	Henry Kaplan	David Selby	April 16, 1970	April 23, 1970	VOL20
985	"1000"	Gordon Russell	Henry Kaplan	Jerry Lacy	April 17, 1970	April 24, 1970	VOL20
986	"1001"	Gordon Russell	Lela Swift	Jerry Lacy	April 14, 1970	April 27, 1970	VOL20
987	"1002"	Joe Caldwell	Lela Swift	Lisa Richards	April 23, 1970	April 28, 1970	VOL20
988	"1003"	Sam Hall	Henry Kaplan	Paula Laurence	April 20, 1970	April 29, 1970	VOL20
989	"1004"	Sam Hall	Henry Kaplan	Jerry Lacy	April 21, 1970	April 30, 1970	VOL20
990	"1005"	Joe Caldwell	Lela Swift	Jered Holmes	April 22, 1970	May 1, 1970	VOL20
991	"1006"	Gordon Russell	Lela Swift	John Harkins	April 29, 1970	May 4, 1970	VOL20
992	"1007"	Sam Hall	Lela Swift	Grayson Hall	April 27, 1970	May 5, 1970	VOL20
993	"1008"	Joe Caldwell	Henry Kaplan	Lara Parker	April 28, 1970	May 6, 1970	VOL20
994	"1009"	Gordon Russell	Henry Kaplan	Ken McEwen	April 30, 1970	May 7, 1970	VOL20
995	"1010"	Gordon Russell	Henry Kaplan	Elizabeth Eis	May 1, 1970	May 8, 1970	VOL20
996	"1011"	Sam Hall	Henry Kaplan	Nancy Barrett	May 4, 1970	May 11, 1970	VOL20
997	"1012"	Joe Caldwell	Henry Kaplan	Lara Parker	May 5, 1970	May 12, 1970	VOL20
998	"1013"	Gordon Russell	Lela Swift	Lara Parker	May 6, 1970	May 13, 1970	VOL20
999	"1014"	Joe Caldwell	Lela Swift	Christopher Pennock	May 7, 1970	May 14, 1970	VOL20
1000	"1015"	Sam Hall	Lela Swift	Grayson Hall	May 8, 1970	May 15, 1970	VOL20
1001	"1016"	Sam Hall	Lela Swift	Christopher Pennock	May 11, 1970	May 18, 1970	VOL20
1002	"1017"	Joe Caldwell	Lela Swift	Nancy Barrett	May 12, 1970	May 19, 1970	VOL20
1003	"1018"	Gordon Russell	Henry Kaplan	David Selby	May 13, 1970	May 20, 1970	VOL20
1004	"1019"	Sam Hall	Henry Kaplan	Grayson Hall	May 14, 1970	May 21, 1970	VOL20
1005	"1020"	Sam Hall	Henry Kaplan	John Karlen	May 15, 1970	May 22, 1970	VOL20
1006	"1021"	Joe Caldwell	Henry Kaplan	David Selby	May 18, 1970	May 25, 1970	VOL20
1007	"1022"	Joe Caldwell	Henry Kaplan	Christopher Pennock	May 19, 1970	May 26, 1970	VOL21
1008	"1023"	Joe Caldwell	Lela Swift	Lara Parker	May 20, 1970	May 27, 1970	VOL21
1009	"1024"	Sam Hall	Lela Swift	Grayson Hall	May 21, 1970	May 28, 1970	VOL21
1010	"1025"	Sam Hall	Lela Swift	Grayson Hall	May 22, 1970	May 29, 1970	VOL21
1011	"1026"	Joe Caldwell	Lela Swift	Grayson Hall	May 25, 1970	June 1, 1970	VOL21
1012	"1027"	Joe Caldwell	Lela Swift	Christopher Pennock	May 26, 1970	June 2, 1970	VOL21
1013	"1028"	Sam Hall	Henry Kaplan	Ken McEwen	May 28, 1970	June 3, 1970	VOL21
1014	"1029"	Sam Hall	Henry Kaplan	Lara Parker	May 17, 1970	June 4, 1970	VOL21
1015	"1030"	Sam Hall	Henry Kaplan	Thayer David	June 1, 1970	June 5, 1970	VOL21
1016	"1031"	Joe Caldwell	Henry Kaplan	Grayson Hall	June 2, 1970	June 8, 1970	VOL21
1017	"1032"	Gordon Russell	Henry Kaplan	Christopher Pennock	May 29, 1970	June 9, 1970	VOL21
1018	"1033"	Joe Caldwell	Lela Swift	Lisa Richards	June 3, 1970	June 10, 1970	VOL21
1019	"1034"	Sam Hall	Lela Swift	Grayson Hall	June 4, 1970	June 11, 1970	VOL21
1020	"1035"	Gordon Russell	Lela Swift	Nancy Barrett	June 5, 1970	June 12, 1970	VOL21
1021	"1036"	Joe Caldwell	Lela Swift	Lara Parker	June 8, 1970	June 15, 1970	VOL21
1022	"1037"	Gordon Russell	Lela Swift	Kathryn Leigh Scott	June 9, 1970	June 16, 1970	VOL21
1023	"1038"	Sam Hall	Henry Kaplan	Grayson Hall	June 10, 1970	June 17, 1970	VOL21
1024	"1039"	Sam Hall	Henry Kaplan	Thayer David	June 11, 1970	June 18, 1970	VOL21
1025	"1040"	Joe Caldwell	Henry Kaplan	Louis Edmonds	June 12, 1970	June 19, 1970	VOL21
1026	"1041"	Gordon Russell	Henry Kaplan	Grayson Hall	June 15, 1970	June 22, 1970	VOL21
1027	"1042"	Joe Caldwell	Henry Kaplan	Nancy Barrett	June 16, 1970	June 23, 1970	VOL21
1028	"1043"	Sam Hall	Lela Swift	John Karlen	June 17, 1970	June 24, 1970	VOL21
1029	"1044"	Sam Hall	Lela Swift	John Karlen	June 18, 1970	June 25, 1970	VOL21
1030	"1045"	Gordon Russell	Lela Swift	Grayson Hall	June 19, 1970	June 26, 1970	VOL21
1031	"1046"	Gordon Russell	Lela Swift	Nancy Barrett	June 23, 1970	June 29, 1970	VOL21
1032	"1047"	Joe Caldwell	Lela Swift	Thayer David	June 22, 1970	June 30, 1970	VOL21
1033	"1048"	Gordon Russell	Henry Kaplan	Nancy Barrett	June 24, 1970	July 1, 1970	VOL21
1034	"1049"	Sam Hall	Henry Kaplan	Lara Parker	June 25, 1970	July 2, 1970	VOL21
1035	"1050"	Sam Hall	Henry Kaplan	Louis Edmonds	June 20, 1970	July 3, 1970	VOL21
1036	"1051"	Gordon Russell	Henry Kaplan	Kathryn Leigh Scott	June 29, 1970	July 6, 1970	VOL21
1037	"1052"	Joe Caldwell	Henry Kaplan	Grayson Hall	June 30, 1970	July 7, 1970	VOL21
1038	"1053"	Gordon Russell	Lela Swift	Louis Edmonds	July 1, 1970	July 8, 1970	VOL21
1039	"1054"	Sam Hall	Lela Swift	Kathryn Leigh Scott	July 2, 1970	July 9, 1970	VOL21
1040	"1055"	Joe Caldwell	Lela Swift	Brian Sturdivant	July 3, 1970	July 10, 1970	VOL21
1041	"1056"	Gordon Russell	Lela Swift	Kathryn Leigh Scott	July 6, 1970	July 13, 1970	VOL21
1042	"1057"	Joe Caldwell	Henry Kaplan	Colin Hamilton	July 7, 1970	July 14, 1970	VOL21
1043	"1058"	Sam Hall	Henry Kaplan	Thayer David	July 8, 1970	July 15, 1970	VOL21
1044	"1059"	Gordon Russell	Henry Kaplan	Thayer David	July 9, 1970	July 16, 1970	VOL21
1045	"1060"	Gordon Russell	Henry Kaplan	Kathryn Leigh Scott	July 10, 1970	July 17, 1970	VOL21
1046	"1061"	Joe Caldwell	Henry Kaplan	Clarice Blackburn	July 13, 1970	July 20, 1970	VOL21
1047	"1062"	Sam Hall	Lela Swift	Nancy Barrett	July 14, 1970	July 21, 1970	VOL22
1048	"1063"	Sam Hall	Lela Swift	Don Crabtree	July 15, 1970	July 22, 1970	VOL22
1049	"1064"	Joe Caldwell	Lela Swift	Nancy Barrett	July 16, 1970	July 23, 1970	VOL22
1050	"1065"	Gordon Russell	Lela Swift	Thayer David	July 17, 1970	July 24, 1970	VOL22
1051	"1066"	Gordon Russell	Lela Swift	James Storm	July 20, 1970	July 27, 1970	VOL22
1052	"1067"	Joe Caldwell	Lela Swift	Thayer David	July 21, 1970	July 28, 1970	VOL22
1053	"1068"	Joe Caldwell	Henry Kaplan	Nancy Barrett	July 22, 1970	July 29, 1970	VOL22
1054	"1069"	Sam Hall	Henry Kaplan	David Selby	July 23, 1970	July 30, 1970	VOL22
1055	"1070"	Sam Hall	Henry Kaplan	Thayer David	July 24, 1970	July 31, 1970	VOL22
1056	"1071"	Gordon Russell	Henry Kaplan	David Selby	July 28, 1970	August 3, 1970	VOL22
1057	"1072"	Gordon Russell	Henry Kaplan	Thayer David	July 27, 1970	August 4, 1970	VOL22
1058	"1073"	Sam Hall	Lela Swift	Kathryn Leigh Scott	July 31, 1970	August 5, 1970	VOL22
1059	"1074"	Sam Hall	Lela Swift	Nancy Barrett	July 30, 1970	August 6, 1970	VOL22
1060	"1075"	Joe Caldwell	Lela Swift	David Selby	July 29, 1970	August 7, 1970	VOL22
1061	"1076"	Joe Caldwell	Lela Swift	David Selby	August 3, 1970	August 10, 1970	VOL22
1062	"1077"	Joe Caldwell	Lela Swift	Kathryn Leigh Scott	August 4, 1970	August 11, 1970	VOL22
1063	"1078"	Joe Caldwell	Henry Kaplan	Grayson Hall	August 5, 1970	August 12, 1970	VOL22
1064	"1079"	Gordon Russell	Henry Kaplan	Ken McEwen	August 10, 1970	August 13, 1970	VOL22
1065	"1080"	Gordon Russell	Henry Kaplan	Nancy Barrett	August 11, 1970	August 14, 1970	VOL22
1066	"1081"	Sam Hall	Henry Kaplan	Nancy Barrett	August 7, 1970	August 17, 1970	VOL22
1067	"1082"	Sam Hall	Henry Kaplan	Ken McEwen	August 6, 1970	August 18, 1970	VOL22
1068	"1083"	Gordon Russell	Lela Swift	Thayer David	August 12, 1970	August 19, 1970	VOL22
1069	"1084"	Gordon Russell	Lela Swift	Thayer David	August 17, 1970	August 20, 1970	VOL22
1070	"1085"	Joe Caldwell	Lela Swift	David Selby	August 14, 1970	August 21, 1970	VOL22
1071	"1086"	Joe Caldwell	Lela Swift	David Selby	August 13, 1970	August 24, 1970	VOL22
1072	"1087"	Sam Hall	Henry Kaplan	Grayson Hall	August 18, 1970	August 25, 1970	VOL22
1073	"1088"	Sam Hall	Henry Kaplan	Joan Bennett	August 19, 1970	August 26, 1970	VOL22
1074	"1089"	Gordon Russell	Henry Kaplan	Grayson Hall	August 20, 1970	August 27, 1970	VOL22
1075	"1090"	Gordon Russell	Henry Kaplan	Kathryn Leigh Scott	August 24, 1970	August 28, 1970	VOL22
1076	"1091"	Joe Caldwell	Henry Kaplan	David Henesy	August 25, 1970	August 31, 1970	VOL22
1077	"1092"	Sam Hall	Henry Kaplan	David Henesy	August 26, 1970	September 1, 1970	VOL22
1078	"1093"	Sam Hall	Lela Swift	Kathryn Leigh Scott	August 31, 1970	September 2, 1970	VOL22
1079	"1094"	Sam Hall	Lela Swift	Christopher Pennock	September 1, 1970	September 3, 1970	VOL22
1080	"1095"	Sam Hall	Henry Kaplan	David Henesy	September 2, 1970	September 4, 1970	VOL22
1081	"1096"	Gordon Russell	Henry Kaplan	David Selby	August 21, 1970	September 7, 1970	VOL22
1082	"1097"	Gordon Russell	Henry Kaplan	Nancy Barrett	August 27, 1970	September 8, 1970	VOL22
1083	"1098"	Joe Caldwell	Henry Kaplan	David Selby	August 28, 1970	September 9, 1970	VOL22
1084	"1099"	Sam Hall	Lela Swift	David Selby	September 3, 1970	September 10, 1970	VOL22
1085	"1100"	Sam Hall	Lela Swift	Kathryn Leigh Scott	September 4, 1970	September 11, 1970	VOL22
1086	"1101"	Gordon Russell	Henry Kaplan	Nancy Barrett	September 8, 1970	September 14, 1970	VOL22
1087	"1102"	Joe Caldwell	Henry Kaplan	David Selby	September 7, 1970	September 15, 1970	VOL23
1088	"1103"	Gordon Russell	Lela Swift	David Selby	September 9, 1970	September 16, 1970	VOL23
1089	"1104"	Gordon Russell	Henry Kaplan	Clarice Blackburn	September 11, 1970	September 17, 1970	VOL23
1090	"1105"	Gordon Russell	Lela Swift	Nancy Barrett	September 16, 1970	September 18, 1970	VOL23
1091	"1106"	Sam Hall	Henry Kaplan	Christopher Pennock	September 10, 1970	September 21, 1970	VOL23
1092	"1107"	Sam Hall	Henry Kaplan	Grayson Hall	September 14, 1970	September 22, 1970	VOL23
1093	"1108"	Gordon Russell	Lela Swift	Kathryn Leigh Scott	September 17, 1970	September 23, 1970	VOL23
1094	"1109"	Gordon Russell	Lela Swift	James Storm	September 15, 1970	September 24, 1970	VOL23
1095	"1110"	Sam Hall	Lela Swift	Virginia Vestoff	September 18, 1970	September 25, 1970	VOL23
1096	"1111"	Sam Hall	Lela Swift	Thayer David	September 23, 1970	September 28, 1970	VOL23
1097	"1112"	Sam Hall	Lela Swift	Virginia Vestoff	September 22, 1970	September 29, 1970	VOL23
1098	"1113"	Sam Hall	Henry Kaplan	Thayer David	September 24, 1970	September 30, 1970	VOL23
1099	"1114"	Gordon Russell	Henry Kaplan	Grayson Hall	September 25, 1970	October 1, 1970	VOL23
1100	"1115"	Gordon Russell	Lela Swift	Virginia Vestoff	September 21, 1970	October 2, 1970	VOL23
1101	"1116"	Gordon Russell	Henry Kaplan	Virginia Vestoff	September 28, 1970	October 5, 1970	VOL23
1102	"1117"	Gordon Russell	Henry Kaplan	Virginia Vestoff	September 29, 1970	October 6, 1970	VOL23
1103	"1118"	Gordon Russell	Henry Kaplan	Louis Edmonds	September 30, 1970	October 7, 1970	VOL23
1104	"1119"	Gordon Russell	Lela Swift	Virginia Vestoff	October 1, 1970	October 8, 1970	VOL23
1105	"1120"	Sam Hall	Lela Swift	John Karlen	October 2, 1970	October 9, 1970	VOL23
1106	"1121"	Sam Hall	Lela Swift	Kate Jackson	October 6, 1970	October 12, 1970	VOL23
1107	"1122"	Sam Hall	Lela Swift	John Karlen	October 5, 1970	October 13, 1970	VOL23
1108	"1123"	Gordon Russell	Henry Kaplan	David Selby	October 8, 1970	October 14, 1970	VOL23
1109	"1124"	Sam Hall	Henry Kaplan	Jerry Lacy	October 7, 1970	October 15, 1970	VOL23
1110	"1125"	Gordon Russell	Henry Kaplan	James Storm	October 9, 1970	October 16, 1970	VOL23
1111	"1126"	Sam Hall	Henry Kaplan	Joan Bennett	October 12, 1970	October 19, 1970	VOL23
1112	"1127"	Sam Hall	Henry Kaplan	James Storm	October 13, 1970	October 20, 1970	VOL23
1113	"1128"	Gordon Russell	Henry Kaplan	Christopher Pennock	October 16, 1970	October 21, 1970	VOL23
1114	"1129"	Gordon Russell	Lela Swift	Lara Parker	October 15, 1970	October 22, 1970	VOL23
1115	"1130"	Sam Hall	Henry Kaplan	Nancy Barrett	October 14, 1970	October 26, 1970	VOL23
1116	"1131"	Sam Hall	Lela Swift	Norman Parker	October 19, 1970	October 27, 1970	VOL23
1117	"1132"	Sam Hall	Henry Kaplan	David Selby	October 22, 1970	October 28, 1970	VOL23
1118	"1133"	Sam Hall	Henry Kaplan	Jerry Lacy	October 21, 1970	October 29, 1970	VOL23
1119	"1134/1135"	Gordon Russell	Henry Kaplan	James Storm	October 20, 1970	October 30, 1970	VOL23
1120	"1136"	Gordon Russell	Lela Swift	David Selby	October 26, 1970	November 2, 1970	VOL23
1121	"1137"	Gordon Russell	Henry Kaplan	James Storm	October 23, 1970	November 3, 1970	VOL23
1122	"1138"	Sam Hall	Henry Kaplan	Jerry Lacy	October 28, 1970	November 4, 1970	VOL23
1123	"1139"	Gordon Russell	Lela Swift	Jerry Lacy	October 29, 1970	November 5, 1970	VOL23
1124	"1140"	Gordon Russell	Lela Swift	David Selby	October 30, 1970	November 6, 1970	VOL23
1125	"1141"	Sam Hall	Henry Kaplan	Kate Jackson	October 27, 1970	November 9, 1970	VOL23
1126	"1142"	Sam Hall	Lela Swift	David Selby	November 2, 1970	November 10, 1970	VOL23
1127	"1143"	Gordon Russell	Henry Kaplan	Lara Parker	November 3, 1970	November 11, 1970	VOL24
1128	"1144"	Gordon Russell	Henry Kaplan	Lara Parker	November 4, 1970	November 12, 1970	VOL24
1129	"1145"	Gordon Russell	Henry Kaplan	Louis Edmonds	November 9, 1970	November 13, 1970	VOL24
1130	"1146"	Sam Hall	Henry Kaplan	Kate Jackson	November 6, 1970	November 16, 1970	VOL24
1131	"1147"	Sam Hall	Henry Kaplan	Virginia Vestoff	November 10, 1970	November 17, 1970	VOL24
1132	"1148"	Sam Hall	Henry Kaplan	Grayson Hall	November 5, 1970	November 18, 1970	VOL24
1133	"1149"	Gordon Russell	Henry Kaplan	Jerry Lacy	November 11, 1970	November 19, 1970	VOL24
1134	"1150"	Gordon Russell	Lela Swift	Kate Jackson	November 12, 1970	November 20, 1970	VOL24
1135	"1151"	Sam Hall	Lela Swift	James Storm	November 16, 1970	November 23, 1970	VOL24
1136	"1152"	Gordon Russell	Lela Swift	Jerry Lacy	November 13, 1970	November 24, 1970	VOL24
1137	"1153"	Gordon Russell	Lela Swift	Kate Jackson	November 17, 1970	November 25, 1970	VOL24
1138	"1154/1155"	Sam Hall	Henry Kaplan	Christopher Pennock	November 18, 1970	November 26, 1970	VOL24
1139	"1156"	Sam Hall	Henry Kaplan	Virginia Vestoff	November 19, 1970	November 30, 1970	VOL24
1140	"1157"	Gordon Russell	Henry Kaplan	Humbert Allen Astredo	November 20, 1970	December 1, 1970	VOL24
1141	"1158"	Gordon Russell	Henry Kaplan	Kate Jackson	November 24, 1970	December 2, 1970	VOL24
1142	"1159"	Gordon Russell	Henry Kaplan	Christopher Pennock	November 25, 1970	December 3, 1970	VOL24
1143	"1160"	Sam Hall	Henry Kaplan	John Karlen	November 23, 1970	December 4, 1970	VOL24
1144	"1161"	Sam Hall	Lela Swift	Humbert Allen Astredo	November 27, 1970	December 7, 1970	VOL24
1145	"1162"	Sam Hall	Henry Kaplan	John Karlen	December 2, 1970	December 8, 1970	VOL24
1146	"1163"	Sam Hall	Henry Kaplan	John Karlen	December 3, 1970	December 9, 1970	VOL24
1147	"1164"	Sam Hall	Henry Kaplan	Kate Jackson	December 4, 1970	December 10, 1970	VOL24
1148	"1165"	Gordon Russell	Lela Swift	John Karlen	November 30, 1970	December 11, 1970	VOL24
1149	"1166"	Gordon Russell	Lela Swift	Kate Jackson	December 1, 1970	December 14, 1970	VOL24
1150	"1167"	Sam Hall	Henry Kaplan	Jerry Lacy	December 7, 1970	December 15, 1970	VOL24
1151	"1168"	Gordon Russell	Henry Kaplan	Grayson Hall	December 8, 1970	December 16, 1970	VOL24
1152	"1169"	Sam Hall	Henry Kaplan	Lara Parker	December 9, 1970	December 17, 1970	VOL24
1153	"1170"	Gordon Russell	Lela Swift	Kate Jackson	December 10, 1970	December 18, 1970	VOL24
1154	"1171"	Sam Hall	Lela Swift	Jerry Lacy	December 14, 1970	December 21, 1970	VOL24
1155	"1172"	Gordon Russell	Lela Swift	Grayson Hall	December 11, 1970	December 22, 1970	VOL24
1156	"1173"	Sam Hall	Lela Swift	Lara Parker	December 15, 1970	December 23, 1970	VOL24
1157	"1174/1175"	Sam Hall	Henry Kaplan	Nancy Barrett	December 18, 1970	December 24, 1970	VOL24
1158	"1176"	Sam Hall	Henry Kaplan	Grayson Hall	December 17, 1970	December 28, 1970	VOL24
1159	"1177"	Sam Hall	Henry Kaplan	Lara Parker	December 16, 1970	December 29, 1970	VOL24
1160	"1178"	Gordon Russell	Henry Kaplan	Humbert Allen Astredo	December 23, 1970	December 30, 1970	VOL24
1161	"1179/1180"	Gordon Russell	Henry Kaplan	Joan Bennett	December 21, 1970	December 31, 1970	VOL24

== 1971 ==
#	Episode	Writer	Director	Narrator	Tape date	Original airdate	DVD volume
1162	"1181"	Gordon Russell	Henry Kaplan	James Storm	December 22, 1970	January 4, 1971	VOL24
1163	"1182"	Sam Hall	Lela Swift	Kate Jackson	December 28, 1970	January 5, 1971	VOL24
1164	"1183"	Sam Hall	Lela Swift	Virginia Vestoff	December 29, 1970	January 6, 1971	VOL24
1165	"1184"	Sam Hall	Henry Kaplan	James Storm	December 30, 1970	January 7, 1971	VOL24
1166	"1185"	Gordon Russell	Lela Swift	Humbert Allen Astredo	December 24, 1970	January 8, 1971	VOL24
1167	"1186"	Gordon Russell	Henry Kaplan	Jonathan Frid	December 31, 1970	January 11, 1971	VOL25
1168	"1187"	Gordon Russell	Henry Kaplan	Grayson Hall	January 4, 1971	January 12, 1971	VOL25
1169	"1188"	Gordon Russell	Henry Kaplan	Virginia Vestoff	January 5, 1971	January 13, 1971	VOL25
1170	"1189"	Sam Hall	Lela Swift	Nancy Barrett	January 6, 1971	January 14, 1971	VOL25
1171	"1190"	Gordon Russell	Lela Swift	Nancy Barrett	January 7, 1971	January 15, 1971	VOL25
1172	"1191"	Sam Hall	Lela Swift	Grayson Hall	January 8, 1971	January 18, 1971	VOL25
1173	"1192"	Gordon Russell	Lela Swift	James Storm	January 11, 1971	January 19, 1971	VOL25
1174	"1193"	Gordon Russell	Henry Kaplan	James Storm	January 12, 1971	January 20, 1971	VOL25
1175	"1194"	Sam Hall	Henry Kaplan	Humbert Allen Astredo	January 13, 1971	January 21, 1971	VOL25
1176	"1195"	Gordon Russell	Henry Kaplan	Lara Parker	January 14, 1971	January 22, 1971	VOL25
1177	"1196"	Sam Hall	Henry Kaplan	John Karlen	January 15, 1971	January 25, 1971	VOL25
1178	"1197"	Gordon Russell	Lela Swift	Jerry Lacy	January 18, 1971	January 26, 1971	VOL25
1179	"1198"	Sam Hall	Lela Swift	Thayer David	January 19, 1971	January 27, 1971	VOL25
1180	"1199"	Sam Hall	Henry Kaplan	Lara Parker	January 20, 1971	January 28, 1971	VOL25
1181	"1200"	Sam Hall	Lela Swift	Jonathan Frid	January 25, 1971	January 29, 1971	VOL25
1182	"1201"	Gordon Russell	Henry Kaplan	David Selby	January 21, 1971	February 1, 1971	VOL25
1183	"1202"	Gordon Russell	Henry Kaplan	John Karlen	January 22, 1971	February 2, 1971	VOL25
1184	"1203"	Gordon Russell	Lela Swift	Grayson Hall	January 26, 1971	February 3, 1971	VOL25
1185	"1204"	Sam Hall	Henry Kaplan	David Selby	January 27, 1971	February 4, 1971	VOL25
1186	"1205"	Sam Hall	Henry Kaplan	Jonathan Frid	January 28, 1971	February 5, 1971	VOL25
1187	"1206"	Sam Hall	Henry Kaplan	Mary Cooper	January 29, 1971	February 8, 1971	VOL25
1188	"1207/1208"	Gordon Russell	Henry Kaplan	John Karlen	February 1, 1971	February 10, 1971	VOL25
1189	"1209"	Gordon Russell	Henry Kaplan	David Selby	February 2, 1971	February 11, 1971	VOL25
1190	"1210"	Sam Hall	Henry Kaplan	Lara Parker	February 3, 1971	February 12, 1971	VOL25
1191	"1211"	Gordon Russell	Lela Swift	David Selby	February 4, 1971	February 15, 1971	VOL25
1192	"1212"	Gordon Russell	Lela Swift	David Selby	February 5, 1971	February 16, 1971	VOL25
1193	"1213"	Sam Hall	Lela Swift	Kate Jackson	February 8, 1971	February 17, 1971	VOL25
1194	"1214"	Gordon Russell	Lela Swift	Nancy Barrett	February 9, 1971	February 18, 1971	VOL25
1195	"1215"	Sam Hall	Henry Kaplan	Nancy Barrett	February 10, 1971	February 19, 1971	VOL25
1196	"1216"	Gordon Russell	Henry Kaplan	John Karlen	February 11, 1971	February 22, 1971	VOL25
1197	"1217"	Sam Hall	Henry Kaplan	Kate Jackson	February 12, 1971	February 23, 1971	VOL25
1198	"1218"	Gordon Russell	Lela Swift	Mary Cooper	February 17, 1971	February 24, 1971	VOL25
1199	"1219"	Gordon Russell	Henry Kaplan	Keith Prentice	February 18, 1971	February 25, 1971	VOL25
1200	"1220"	Gordon Russell	Henry Kaplan	David Selby	February 15, 1971	February 26, 1971	VOL25
1201	"1221"	Gordon Russell	Henry Kaplan	Kate Jackson	February 16, 1971	March 1, 1971	VOL25
1202	"1222"	Gordon Russell	Lela Swift	David Selby	February 19, 1971	March 2, 1971	VOL25
1203	"1223"	Gordon Russell	Lela Swift	Grayson Hall	February 22, 1971	March 3, 1971	VOL25
1204	"1224"	Gordon Russell	Lela Swift	Grayson Hall	February 23, 1971	March 4, 1971	VOL25
1205	"1225"	Gordon Russell	Henry Kaplan	John Karlen	February 24, 1971	March 5, 1971	VOL25
1206	"1226"	Gordon Russell	Henry Kaplan	Christopher Pennock	March 1, 1971	March 8, 1971	VOL25
1207	"1227"	Gordon Russell	Henry Kaplan	John Karlen	March 2, 1971	March 9, 1971	VOL26
1208	"1228"	Gordon Russell	Henry Kaplan	Jonathan Frid	February 25, 1971	March 10, 1971	VOL26
1209	"1229"	Gordon Russell	Henry Kaplan	Grayson Hall	February 26, 1971	March 11, 1971	VOL26
1210	"1230"	Gordon Russell	Henry Kaplan	David Selby	March 3, 1971	March 12, 1971	VOL26
1211	"1231"	Gordon Russell	Lela Swift	Louis Edmonds	March 4, 1971	March 15, 1971	VOL26
1212	"1232"	Gordon Russell	Lela Swift	Jonathan Frid	March 5, 1971	March 16, 1971	VOL26
1213	"1233"	Gordon Russell	Lela Swift	John Karlen	March 8, 1971	March 17, 1971	VOL26
1214	"1234"	Gordon Russell	Henry Kaplan	Grayson Hall	March 12, 1971	March 18, 1971	VOL26
1215	"1235"	Gordon Russell	Lela Swift	Jonathan Frid	March 9, 1971	March 19, 1971	VOL26
1216	"1236"	Gordon Russell	Henry Kaplan	Lara Parker	March 10, 1971	March 22, 1971	VOL26
1217	"1237"	Gordon Russell	Henry Kaplan	Keith Prentice	March 11, 1971	March 23, 1971	VOL26
1218	"1238"	Gordon Russell	Henry Kaplan	Grayson Hall	March 15, 1971	March 24, 1971	VOL26
1219	"1239"	Gordon Russell	Henry Kaplan	John Karlen	March 16, 1971	March 25, 1971	VOL26
1220	"1240"	Gordon Russell	Lela Swift	Lara Parker	March 17, 1971	March 26, 1971	VOL26
1221	"1241"	Gordon Russell	Lela Swift	Nancy Barrett	March 18, 1971	March 29, 1971	VOL26
1222	"1242"	Gordon Russell	Lela Swift	Grayson Hall	March 19, 1971	March 30, 1971	VOL26
1223	"1243"	Gordon Russell	Lela Swift	Grayson Hall	March 22, 1971	March 31, 1971	VOL26
1224	"1244"	Gordon Russell	Henry Kaplan	Grayson Hall	March 23, 1971	April 1, 1971	VOL26
1225	"1245"	Sam Hall	Lela Swift	Grayson Hall (opening); Thayer David (closing)	March 24, 1971	April 2, 1971	VOL26

== Narrations ==
At the start of each episode of Dark Shadows, there is an opening narration. From episodes 1–274, Alexandra Moltke always provides the narration in character as Victoria Winters, nearly always beginning with the words "My name is Victoria Winters", even in episodes in which Victoria does not appear. Episode 6 is the only episode from episodes 1–274 where Moltke still narrates as Victoria but doesn't say "My name is Victoria Winters". Series creator, Dan Curtis, put an end to this arrangement when he realized that Moltke was being paid for all of the episodes that she was narrating, including episodes where Victoria didn't appear. Nancy Barrett narrates episode 275 in the third person. From episode 275 onwards, narrations are in the third person, apart from the first person terms "we" and "us" sometimes being said in several narrations, particularly during the NABET strike that affected episodes 335–341 and 343. From episodes 275–331, Moltke continues to narrate all the episodes in which she does appear. Episode 332 is the first episode in which Moltke appears in which she doesn't do the narration. In total, Moltke was the narrator on 382 actual episodes (270 as Victoria Winters, and 112 in the third person), with episode 626 being her last narration.

From episodes 1–458, the narrator is always a female, including Vala Clifton, who only appeared in three episodes of Dark Shadows (i.e. episodes 439, 440 and 441). Clifton narrated the first two episodes in which she appeared, due to being the only female cast member in them. Episode 459 is the first episode narrated by a male, i.e. Thayer David. In episode 459, the only female in the episode is Rebecca Shaw, who only appears in this one episode as an unnamed barmaid. The second episode with a male narrator, also Thayer David, is episode 527. Alexandra Moltke is in episode 527, so this time the role of narrator was not given to a man out of necessity. Although from now on men will also take turns as narrator, the majority of episodes will still be narrated by women. The top six most prominent narrators are women, i.e. Alexandra Moltke with 382, Grayson Hall with 157, Nancy Barrett with 119, Kathryn Leigh Scott with 80, Joan Bennett with 76, and Lara Parker with 68. The man who narrates the most episodes is David Selby with 48, closely followed by Thayer David with 45, then Louis Edmonds with 33, and John Karlen with 25. Every other man has less than 20.

The final episode, i.e. episode 1245 (the #1,225th episode actually made), has two narrations, one opening (by Grayson Hall), and one closing (by Thayer David). The final episode is the only episode with a closing narration.

=== Narrations by actual episode total ===
There are 1,225 opening narrations, and 1 closing narration, for a total of 1,226 narrations.

- Alexandra Moltke: 382 (270 as Victoria Winters, 112 in the third person)
- Grayson Hall: 157
- Nancy Barrett: 119
- Kathryn Leigh Scott: 80
- Joan Bennett: 76
- Lara Parker: 68 (69 if including the restored narration on the missing episode, i.e. 1219 or #1,199)
- David Selby: 48
- Thayer David: 45 (includes the closing narration on the final episode, i.e. 1245 or #1,225)
- Louis Edmonds: 33
- John Karlen: 25
- Clarice Blackburn: 22
- Jerry Lacy: 19
- Kate Jackson: 13
- Humbert Allen Astredo: 12
- Jonathan Frid: 12
- Christopher Pennock: 12
- Don Briscoe: 11
- James Storm: 11
- Virginia Vestoff: 10
- Roger Davis: 9
- Marie Wallace: 9
- Terry Crawford: 7
- Michael Stroka: 6
- Lisa Richards: 5
- Ken McEwen: 4
- David Henesy: 3
- Vala Clifton: 2
- Mary Cooper: 2
- John Harkins: 2
- Cavada Humphrey: 2
- Paula Laurence: 2
- Dennis Patrick: 2
- Keith Prentice: 2 (including the original narration of the missing episode, i.e. 1219 or #1,199)
- Emory Bass: 1
- Christopher Bernau: 1
- Don Crabtree: 1
- Betsy Durkin: 1
- Elizabeth Eis: 1
- Kay Frye: 1
- Colin Hamilton: 1
- Jered Holmes: 1
- Peter Lombard: 1
- Diana Millay: 1
- Vince O'Brien: 1
- Norman Parker: 1
- Ed Riley: 1
- Brian Sturdivant: 1

== Color status and archive status ==
Episodes 1–294 of Dark Shadows were made in black and white. The master tapes of episodes 83, 120, 145, 149, 193, 194 and 260, are lost, with those episodes only existing as kinescope recordings. The English language version of episode 289 also only exists as a kinescope, but the master tape of episode 289 dubbed in the Spanish language does exist. The surviving kinescope copy of episode 145 is noticeably of very inferior quality compared to the kinescope copies of other episodes, with the barely audible sound quality of the episode 145 kinescope being so poor that it's likely to be a duplicate kinescope rather than a first-generation kinescope.

From episode 295 onwards, Dark Shadows was made in color, although 20 actual episodes that were made in color do not exist in that format anymore (i.e. episodes 296, 300, 318, 320, 323, 325, 335, 341, 344, 351, 352, 368/369, 437, 509, 683, 797, 813, 1006, 1017), due to lost master tapes and those episodes only existing as black and white kinescope recordings. Episode 1219 (the #1,199th episode actually made), is the only episode with no master tape and no kinescope copy, so episode 1219 is therefore the only missing episode of Dark Shadows. On the DVD release, episode 1219 is covered by a combination of telesnaps (i.e. still pictures) taken from other episodes, an off–air audio recording made by a fan at home on February 25, 1971, at the time of the original broadcast, and new narration recorded by Lara Parker.

== See also ==
- Dark Shadows (televised storylines)
- Dark Shadows (audio drama)
