= Dark Shadows (televised storylines) =

Plots of American TV show

The following is detailed episode information chronicling the televised storylines of the original run of Dark Shadows episodes, broadcast from 1966 to 1971.

No.	Title	Episodes	Broadcast
1	Victoria's Arrival	1 to 6	June 27, 1966, to July 4, 1966
Victoria Winters travels to Collinsport by train from New York, to be the governess of David Collins at Collinwood. Elizabeth Collins Stoddard has hired her under mysterious circumstances, against the will of her gruff brother, Roger Collins, who is David's father. Victoria, an orphan, believes the job might lead her to find something about her past. Maggie Evans, a waitress at the local inn, warns Victoria about the Collins family, but Victoria goes to Collinwood anyway. Having arrived at Collinwood, Victoria starts to settle in. During her first night at Collinwood, Victoria is awakened by the sounds of a sobbing woman. While searching for the source of the sound, she meets the mentally disturbed David, who only says, “I hate you." After her first night at Collinwood, Victoria decides to go back to New York. Near Widows' Hill, Victoria meets Sam Evans, an artist and Maggie's alcoholic father, who tells her about Josette Collins, a Collins family ancestor who jumped to her death. Victoria returns to her room to find David has helped her “pack” while she was out. Victoria changes her mind and decides to stay at Collinwood with renewed hopes that she will find out something about her past. Victoria asks Elizabeth why she was hired and what she might know about her past. Elizabeth tells Victoria she knows nothing about her past, and does not appreciate being interrogated.
2	The Revenge of Burke Devlin	1 to 201	June 26, 1966, to April 3, 1967
Burke Devlin, an ex-convict and successful businessman, returns to Collinsport after several years away. He has a private investigator checking up on the Collins family. Roger Collins becomes agitated when he finds out Burke is back in town. Bill Malloy, Elizabeth Collins Stoddard's right-hand man at the family owned cannery, meets with Burke, who admits to Bill he has a grudge against the Collins family. Burke visits Sam Evans, who is very uncomfortable with his return to town. Carolyn Stoddard, Elizabeth's daughter, curious about all the talk of Burke Devlin, goes to his hotel room to meet him and ends up bringing him back to Collinwood. Burke meets Elizabeth and offers to buy Collinwood from her, but she tells him it is not for sale. They discuss the five years he spent in prison, and how he has traveled and made a great deal of money in the five years since he has gotten out of prison. Roger believes Burke blames him for being sent to prison ten years ago. Elizabeth tells Carolyn that Burke was convicted of manslaughter ten years ago, and Roger was a witness at the trial. Roger talks with Sam; he says they are the only two people who know what really happened ten years ago. Elizabeth asks Roger if he did send Burke to prison when he was innocent. Roger claims his truthful testimony on the witness stand sent Burke to prison. Whilst Victoria Winters is at the Evans’ cottage for dinner, Burke's manslaughter case comes up. Sam tells her that Roger and Burke had been out drinking one night. When they decided to go home, Burke had insisted on driving. On the way back, he hit and killed a man. Burke invites himself to dinner with Sam, Maggie, and Victoria. Burke tells his version of the accident that happened ten years ago; he believes that Roger was the one driving the car that night. Burke tries to 'buy' employees from the Collins cannery, hoping they will help him with his plot to destroy the Collins family. Amos Fitch, one of the Collins cannery employees, makes it clear that he and his colleagues cannot be bought; he then tells Elizabeth of Burke's plan. Elizabeth calls Burke to tell him she is ready for a fight. Burke purchases the Logansport cannery to compete against the Collins cannery. Laura Collins, Roger's estranged wife, returns to Collinsport. Roger and Sam are both concerned, as Laura also knows what happened ten years earlier when Burke was charged with manslaughter. Roger asks Laura where she stands in the Burke's manslaughter case; she claims she has no interest in getting involved. Burke visits Laura at the cottage; he wants Laura to testify that Roger was driving the car the night of the “accident”. Roger, holding a gun, bursts in on Burke and Laura. Roger warns Burke to leave his wife alone. After a brief struggle and a few insults, Burke leaves. Portia Fitzsimmons, an art dealer, visits Sam telling him she wants to arrange a showing of his work, but he needs to get as many samples of his work from ten to twelve years ago. Sam goes to Roger to get some paintings that Roger purchased ten years earlier to buy Sam's silence in Burke's manslaughter case. Sam warns Roger if he does not come up with the paintings, he will go to Burke with the truth. Roger is unable to locate the paintings. Maggie finds out why Roger purchased the paintings from her father; she encourages Sam to tell Burke the truth. Sam invites Burke over and tells him the whole truth about the accident. Burke and Sam confront Roger. Roger finally breaks down and confesses he was responsible for killing the man who Burke went to prison for. Satisfied in knowing the truth, Burke pursues the matter no further.
3	The Murder of Bill Malloy	46 to 126	August 29, 1966, to December 12, 1966
Bill Malloy fails to attend a meeting he set up with Roger Collins, Burke Devlin, and Sam Evans. From atop Widows’ Hill, Victoria Winters and Carolyn Stoddard see a dead body on the shore below. Roger refuses to believe it was a body; they send Matthew Morgan, the Collinwood caretaker, to check. Matthew claims to find nothing and shows Elizabeth Collins Stoddard the spot and says it was just seaweed that must have washed up on the shore. Later, Matthew confesses to Elizabeth that there was a body and it was Bill Malloy. He explains he found the body on the shore and pushed it back out to sea. Elizabeth calls Sheriff George Patterson. Bill Malloy's body is found. Matthew threatens Burke that if he does not leave the Collins family alone, he will kill him; he tries to choke Burke, but Sheriff Patterson walks in. Victoria finds an expensive-looking fountain pen on the beach not far from where Bill was thought to have died, the same pen Roger was supposed to return to Burke the night of Bill's death. Roger steals the fountain pen from Victoria, as he worries that it will be incriminating evidence. He buries it. Whilst locked in one of the disused rooms in Collinwood, Victoria encounters Bill's ghost, who urges her to leave Collinsport before she is killed like him. Victoria learns that the fountain pen she found belonged to Burke, which leads her to suspect that Burke killed Bill. Carolyn tells Victoria about the pen that Burke gave it her and how Roger lost it the night Bill died. Victoria now suspects Roger. Roger confronts Victoria and swears that he did not kill Bill, but that he found Bill dead when he got to Lookout Point. David Collins tells Matthew that Victoria knows who killed Bill. Victoria is almost killed by someone driving a car on her walk back to Collinwood. Burke tricks Roger into digging up the pen where he buried it; Sheriff Patterson and Burke catch him. Victoria goes to the Old House, the previous mansion inhabited by the Collins family, also situated on the same grounds as Collinwood, to try to find David. Whilst there, Matthew pushes an urn off of the roof in an attempt to kill her. He then traps Victoria in his cottage to find out how much she knows, but accidentally blurts out the truth that he killed Bill, to her. Matthew admits to Elizabeth that he killed Bill and that he tried to kill Victoria. Matthew flees and hides in a secret room at the Old House. Victoria goes to the Old House to find David; while there, she loses her wallet. Victoria later goes back to find it, and Matthew catches her and takes her prisoner, threatening to kill her. Matthew starts to hear voices while trying to sleep, and then sees a light coming from the portrait of Josette Collins. Bill's ghost appears to David and tells him to help Victoria. The ghosts of Bill and Josette appear to Matthew—causing him to die of a heart attack.
4	Laura the Phoenix	123 to 191	December 14, 1966, to March 21, 1967
Roger's estranged wife, Laura Collins, returns to Collinsport after a ten-year absence. She tells Maggie Evans that she has returned to town after being away for a long time in Phoenix, Arizona. Laura points out that the Phoenix is a mythic bird that rises from the ashes of fire and is reborn. While drunk, Sam Evans paints a portrait of Laura in flames, but does not remember painting it the next day. Laura shows up at Collinwood and announces she wants custody of David Collins. David has a nightmare about his mother in which he sees her engulfed in flames. Victoria Winters brings Sam's unfinished portrait of Laura back to Collinwood, David is awakened by his mother's face coming out of the portrait. The ghost of Josette Collins appears before the portrait and completes it to show David's face is in the picture. Sheriff Patterson questions Laura after the Phoenix police claim they have found the burned body of Laura Collins. Victoria and Frank Garner, the Collins family lawyer, discover a crypt containing a Laura Murdoch Stockbridge—who died by fire 200 years earlier. At the Old House, Josette's portrait turns into the portrait of Laura and David in flames that Sam had painted. Elizabeth Collins Stoddard, fearing Laura's mental stability, orders her to leave Collinwood without David. Laura looks into the fire, and Elizabeth falls down the stairs. Laura visits Elizabeth and puts her in a deep trance to keep her from getting in the way of her plans to take David with her. Dr. Peter Guthrie, a parapsychologist, arrives to assess Elizabeth's condition and has her moved to a hospital. A séance is held; Josette speaks through Victoria, warning there is an evil presence at Collinwood. Dr. Guthrie tells Laura he is aware of her powers, and will expose her for what she is. Laura Murdoch Stockbridge's coffin is exhumed and found to be empty. David sees himself burning in the fireplace. An old newspaper article reports that a Laura Murdoch died in a fire with a boy named David in her arms. Dr. Guthrie confronts Laura, accusing her of being the “undead.” She causes his car to crash and burst into flames, killing him. David goes to the old fishing shack to wait for his mother. Laura arrives and causes the shack to start to burn. Josette's ghost helps Victoria to figure out where David is. As the fishing shack burns around Laura, she beckons David to join her in the flames. Victoria arrives at the shack begging him not to follow his mother into the flames. Laura has David recite the story of the Phoenix; as he finishes the story, Laura calls him to the flames. Elizabeth comes out of the trance as Laura starts to burn. Victoria keeps David from going to his mother as she burns to death.
5	The Blackmailing of Elizabeth	193 to 275	March 22, 1967, to July 14, 1967
Jason McGuire, an old friend of Elizabeth Collins Stoddard's long-missing husband Paul Stoddard, shows up at Collinwood. He implies something happened eighteen years earlier, the same time Paul disappeared, then invites himself to stay at Collinwood while he is in town. Jason tells Elizabeth she killed Paul eighteen years ago and he helped her bury him. Jason manages to get Elizabeth to give him a job at the Collins' cannery. As a result, everyone wonders what hold Jason has over Elizabeth. Roger Collins suspects Elizabeth is paying money to Jason because he has something on her. Elizabeth tells Jason she cannot give him any more money as it is starting to attract attention; Jason agrees and decides she should marry him instead. Reluctantly, she agrees. Carolyn Stoddard gets upset with her mother's plans to marry Jason and starts going out with Buzz Hackett, a biker and all-around troublemaker, to get back at her. Elizabeth dreams the widows are calling her to jump from Widows’ Hill. She prepares to jump from Widows’ Hill, but Victoria Winters talks her out of it. Jason catches Carolyn digging through his belongings, he tells her she will have to leave Collinwood after the marriage. As the wedding begins, Carolyn prepares to shoot Jason; however, Elizabeth stops the ceremony and announces that she killed Paul and that Jason buried him in the basement. Sheriff George Patterson and Burke Devlin dig up a trunk in the basement and find it to be empty. Jason confesses to Elizabeth that she did not kill Paul, she only wounded him; Jason and Paul let her think she had killed him and buried the body in the basement. For telling her the truth, Elizabeth allows Jason to leave without pressing charges. Jason breaks into the Old House looking for jewels to steal. He opens the coffin of Barnabas Collins—who strangles him to death.
6	The Introduction of Barnabas	202 to 220	April 4, 1967, to May 1, 1967
Willie Loomis, a friend of Jason McGuire, shows up at Collinwood expecting to move in. Willie starts to admire the jewels in the portrait of Barnabas Collins; after he leaves, the eyes of Barnabas start to glow, and the sound of a heartbeat can be heard. David Collins tells Willie that most of the jewels stayed in the family, with the exception of those like Naomi Collins, a Collins family ancestor, who were buried with their jewels. Willie goes to the Collins family mausoleum and attempts to open Naomi's coffin; however, he discovers a secret room containing a chained coffin. Willie opens it, and Barnabas's hand reaches out and grabs his throat. Barnabas shows up at Collinwood claiming to be a cousin from England. He visits the Old House and speaks to the portrait of Josette Collins, saying that he has come back to live the life he never had. Roger Collins notices Barnabas wears the same ring that the Barnabas in the portrait has on. Everyone comments on how much Barnabas looks like the portrait of the “original” Barnabas. Sheriff George Patterson tells Roger that animals are being “drained” of blood. Dr. Dave Woodard finds Willie is suffering from a massive loss of blood. Elizabeth Collins Stoddard agrees to let Barnabas live in the Old House. Barnabas goes to the Old House and enslaves Willie, forcing him to join him as his daytime protector.
7	The Kidnapping of Maggie	221 to 261	May 2, 1967, to June 26, 1967
Barnabas Collins visits the Collinsport Inn and is struck by Maggie Evans close resemblance to Josette Collins. He deliberately leaves his cane behind so that he can see her again. Joe Haskell, Maggie's boyfriend, arrives to pick her up and she notices the cane; they decide to return it to Barnabas. Barnabas commissions Sam Evans to paint his portrait; Barnabas is insistent he work only at night. Sam paints all night and as sunrise approaches, Barnabas suddenly disappears. Maggie, disturbed by the recent attacks on women in town, dreams that she is dead in a coffin. The next night as Maggie goes to sleep Barnabas creeps into her room. The following morning Maggie is edgy and tired; although she is weak she insists on going to work. In the coffee shop, Maggie passes out. As night falls, Maggie starts to feel better. Maggie becomes increasingly sick; Sam calls the doctor, despite her protests. Dr. Dave Woodard tells Sam and Joe that Maggie is suffering from a loss of blood. Maggie goes missing. Willie Loomis, anonymously, tells Victoria Winters that Maggie can be found at the cemetery on Eagle Hill. Maggie meets Barnabas, however he and Willie are forced to leave her behind when Burke Devlin and Victoria arrive and find Maggie. Barnabas and Willie hide in the secret room in the Collins mausoleum. Barnabas beats Willie for betraying him. After getting Maggie back home, fang marks are discovered on her neck. A violent storm rages over Collinsport and the power goes out. Barnabas shows up at Collinwood and tells Victoria and Carolyn Stoddard the story of Josette Collins and how she jumped from Widow's Hill. Maggie is found unconscious and the wounds on her neck have been re-opened. Dr. Woodard moves her to the hospital. Maggie appears to get worse, the nurse examines her then goes to get the doctor. When they both return Maggie is gone and the window is wide open. The nurse tells Dr. Woodard that there was every indication Maggie was dead. Burke and Joe suspect Willie has something to do with Maggie's disappearance and go to the Old House to question him; however, he is not there and Barnabas vouches for his whereabouts. After they leave, Maggie comes out of an adjoining room. He gives Maggie Josette's music box and tells her she will become Josette. Dr. Woodard is puzzled by what he finds in samples of Maggie's blood. Sam goes to the Old House to work on a portrait of Barnabas, however, Willie tells Sam to take the portrait with him and finish it at home. Sam leaves behind his pipe and Maggie finds it. She sneaks away and Sam sees her through the window of his cottage while working. Barnabas finds her and punishes her for escaping by putting her in his coffin. He plans to make her his vampire bride, she pretends to be Josette in order to escape. Maggie attempts to stake Barnabas, but he rises from his coffin before she has the chance. He locks her up in a cell within the basement. Whilst alone, Maggie hears the sound of a little girl singing. The little girl is the ghost of Sarah Collins, Barnabas' sister. Maggie starts to act childlike. Barnabas thinks she is losing her mind and decides he must kill her. Sarah visits Maggie and teaches her a riddle to help her escape from her cell. Sarah visits Sam and tells him to look for Maggie on the beach that night. Maggie finds a secret door to escape from her cell just as Barnabas rises from his coffin. She escapes and Sam finds her on the beach. However, she regresses and acts like a child, unable to remember her recent experience. Dr. Woodard decides Maggie should be sent to Windcliff Sanitarium for treatment with Dr. Julia Hoffman. They decide to let it be known that Maggie died of shock so no one will look for her.
8	The Introduction of Julia	265 to 365	June 30, 1967, to November 17, 1967
Dr. Julia Hoffman is treating Maggie Evans at Windcliff Sanitarium. Sam Evans and Joe Haskell go to visit her, however, Maggie is still disturbed from her recent experience at the hands of Barnabas Collins. Julia warns Sam and Joe that Maggie will not be herself for a long time and it would be better for them to stay away while she recovers. Julia helps Maggie remember some of the things that happened to her, and decides to take Maggie to Eagle Hill cemetery to help her bring back her memory. Maggie becomes upset when Julia takes her to the Collins Mausoleum. Dr. Dave Woodard arranges it so Julia will meet the Collins family posing as a historian. Maggie is disturbed when Julia mentions Barnabas' name. Whilst at Collinwood, Julia discovers Barnabas has no reflection in a mirror. She sneaks into the Old House during the day and finds Barnabas in his coffin. When Julia next meets Barnabas, she implies she knows something about the “original” Barnabas Collins that Barnabas would be interested in. Barnabas agrees to meet with Julia the next evening. Barnabas appears in Julia's room and fearing she knows his secret attempts to kill her; however, she is expecting him. Julia tells Barnabas that she may be able to cure his “condition”. Sam and Joe are tired of not getting answers about Maggie's condition from Julia. Fearing Julia is deceiving him about a cure, Barnabas attempts to kill her, however, she tells him that Maggie is still alive and will name him unless she is able to keep Maggie from remembering. The ghost of Sarah Collins visits Maggie at Windcliff and helps her escape. Maggie walks into the Blue Whale and passes out. She starts to remember what happened to her, however, Julia is able to hypnotize her before she can reveal it. Barnabas attempts to kill Maggie however he hears Sarah singing and leaves. Barnabas feels Julia's experiments to cure him are making him weak. Dr. Woodard comes up with plan to let people think Maggie is getting her memory back to lure out the kidnapper. Julia tells Barnabas she has written a letter that will expose him if anything should happen to her or Maggie. Willie Loomis is concerned that Barnabas still plans to kill Maggie. Willie breaks into the Evans’ Cottage in an attempt to warn Maggie; however, the police shoot him. They believe him to be Maggie's kidnapper. Dr. Woodard learns that Julia keeps a journal of her experiments on Barnabas. He reads the medical notes and finds out what Barnabas is. Barnabas kills Dr. Woodard with an injection that makes his death look like a heart attack. Barnabas wants Julia treatments accelerated, as he is anxious to win Victoria Winters' love and be free of the vampire curse. Julia's treatments on Barnabas cause his hand to change into that of a very old man. Julia prepares another treatment to reverse the aging that Barnabas has experienced; however, the experiment fails and Barnabas ages even more. Carolyn Stoddard gets suspicious of Barnabas, so she goes to the basement of the Old House where she finds a coffin. Barnabas bites her, placing her under his control. His age is reversed back to normal. Barnabas tells Julia the experiments are over. Julia hypnotizes Victoria and warns her that Barnabas is trying to turn her into Josette Collins. Carolyn finds out Julia is hypnotizing Victoria and tells Barnabas. Julia tells Barnabas she has given her medical notes to someone to turn over to the police if she dies. Barnabas tells Julia that sooner or later he will have her notes and then kill her. He plans to drive her insane so that no one will believe anything she says. She tells him that she has spoken to the ghost of Sarah Collins; he gets angry and tries to strangle her. However, Sarah appears, she tells Barnabas that she will never appear to him again until he learns to be good. A séance is held at Collinwood to contact Sarah Collins; Barnabas fears she will expose him as a vampire. Sarah speaks through Victoria, then Victoria disappears and a strange woman named Phyllis Wick appears in her place.
9	1795 and Barnabas' Curse	365 to 461	November 17, 1967, to April 1, 1968
Victoria Winters is transported back in time to 1795 where she meets Barnabas Collins, at the time before the curse. Abigail Collins, Barnabas' religiously fanatic aunt, immediately becomes suspicious of Victoria's strange clothes and behavior, and accuses her of being possessed by the devil. Joshua Collins, Barnabas' gruff and stern father, agrees to hire Victoria as Sarah's governess. Barnabas eagerly awaits the arrival of Josette du Pres who he will marry. Natalie du Pres, Josette's aunt, and Angelique Bouchard, Josette's maid servant, arrive at Collinwood. Angelique and Barnabas apparently had an affair in the past; however, Barnabas turns down her current advances. Josette and her father, Andre duPres arrive. Angelique, jealous, uses witchcraft to cause Barnabas to choke. She then casts a spell that causes Josette and Jeremiah Collins, Barnabas' uncle, to fall in love with each other. Jeremiah decides to leave town to stop his love for Josette from going any further. Angelique turns Joshua into a cat in order to keep Jeremiah at Collinwood. Following the disappearance of Joshua, Natalie starts to suspect Victoria of being a witch. Angelique is forced to cast a new spell on Josette because of the plans to expedite the marriage to Barnabas. As the ceremony is about to begin, Josette disappears. Abigail and Natalie are now certain a witch is operating at Collinwood. The cat turns back into Joshua Collins in Victoria's room while Abigail is searching it. Abigail decides to send for Reverend Trask from Salem. Jeremiah and Josette become concerned that they have hurt their families by marrying each other and decide to go back to Collinwood. Following their return, Barnabas challenges Jeremiah to a duel. Angelique gives Barnabas a good-luck charm to protect him in the duel. He shoots and mortally wounds Jeremiah. Barnabas tells Angelique that he still loves Josette despite what has happened. Angelique causes Sarah Collins to become ill by putting pins in her doll. Barnabas, desperate to help Sarah, agrees to marry Angelique if she can cure Sarah. Angelique then brews a tea that “cures” Sarah. Jeremiah dies. Barnabas and Angelique marry. Reverend Trask performs the rite of exorcism at the threshold of the Old House. At the same time, Angelique casts a spell that causes Victoria's room to catch fire. Barnabas overhears Angelique as she casts her spell. Victoria runs from the fire into Reverend Trask's arms, who takes this as a confirmation that she is a witch and hands her over to the authorities. Barnabas begins to suspect there is a witch but is not sure if it is Angelique or Victoria. After finding out that Angelique is the witch and is the cause of all the trouble and unhappiness at Collinwood, Barnabas shoots her. Believing herself to be mortally wounded, Angelique puts a curse on Barnabas that he will become one of the undead and anyone who loves him will die. A bat suddenly enters the house and bites Barnabas, making him fatally ill. Angelique recovers from the gunshot and begins to feel remorse for placing the curse on Barnabas. She tries to remove it, but is unsuccessful. A doctor suspects that Barnabas has a case of the plague, but is unsure. When Barnabas dies, Joshua insists that his death be kept a secret so that no one in town will fear a possible plague. Barnabas' coffin is interred in a secret room in the mausoleum, and Joshua gives a false report to the town that Barnabas moved to England for business purposes. Angelique attempts to drive a stake through Barnabas’ heart, but he rises from his coffin as a vampire before she is able to do so and he strangles her to death. Barnabas orders Ben Stokes, a servant at Collinwood, to dig a grave for Angelique and bury her. Barnabas intends to turn Josette into a vampire so they may be together for all eternity. However, the ghost of Angelique tricks Josette into going to Widows' Hill where she sees a horrifying vision of what her life will be like with Barnabas. Frightened, Josette falls to her death. Meanwhile, Victoria is unable to get a respected lawyer to defend her at a witch trial, however, a young law student named Peter Bradford agrees to represent her. Reverend Trask leads the prosecution against her. Peter is unable to prove Victoria's innocence. Despite the best efforts to prove that Angelique was the real witch, Victoria is convicted of witchcraft by the biased panel of judges and sentenced to hang. Barnabas punishes Reverend Trask for what he has done to Victoria by walling him up in the Old House basement. When Joshua finds Barnabas in the Old House, he tells Joshua all about Angelique's curse upon him and that he is one of the undead. Joshua hides Barnabas in the tower room of Collinwood and intends to find a way to lift the curse. Elsewhere, Nathan Forbes pursues Millicent Collins affections after finding out she is wealthy. They marry, shortly after Nathan discovers she has signed all her money over to her younger brother Daniel Collins. Nathan drives Millicent insane and plans to kill Daniel to get control of their money. Nathan attempts to gain guardianship of Daniel, however Naomi Collins, Barnabas' mother, sends Daniel out of his reach. Nathan discovers Barnabas is a vampire and tells Naomi what Barnabas is, and that Barnabas is responsible for a recent spate of attacks in Collinsport. Naomi sees Barnabas bite Millicent and becomes despondent after finding out what her son is. She takes poison, then visits Barnabas and dies in his arms. Barnabas kills Nathan in retribution. Joshua cannot bring himself to kill Barnabas. Unwilling to reveal the secret out of fear about his son being a vampire that it will ruin the family name or save the falsely convicted Victoria, Joshua has Barnabas' coffin in the secret room of the Collins mausoleum chained shut by Ben Stokes, leaving Joshua and Daniel (along with Millicent) the only surviving members of the Collins family. Victoria and Peter declare their love for each other, and she is then led to the gallows and hanged. As Victoria is hanged, she is suddenly transported back to the present day, and Phyllis Wick, the woman who switched places with her at the séance, is sent back to 1795 and hanged in Victoria's place.
10	The Dream Curse	461 to 536	April 1, 1968, to July 15, 1968
Although Victoria Winters endured five months living in the year 1795, only about five minutes passed in the present time when she was away. Victoria has trouble remembering things that happened to her in 1795, however, Barnabas Collins (remembering Victoria from his past) is concerned she knows too much. Victoria has a dream in which Jeremiah Collins warns her that Barnabas will destroy her. As Victoria begins to remember, Barnabas becomes more concerned she will expose him as a vampire. He bites her and compels her to forget everything about her experiences in 1795. Victoria purchases a portrait of Angelique Collins, disturbed by it Barnabas burns it, however, it reappears undamaged. Dr. Julia Hoffman discovers the wounds on Victoria's neck and confronts Barnabas threatening to expose him if he harms Victoria further. Victoria dreams she witnesses Peter Bradford being hanged. Barnabas and Victoria go away together. Whilst out driving, the car crashes as Victoria tries to avoid hitting a man in the road who looks like Peter. Following the accident they are taken to the hospital, Dr. Eric Lang, who is treating Barnabas, tells Julia that he knows what Barnabas is. Dr. Lang exposes Barnabas to sunlight in his hospital room. However, Dr. Lang reveals his treatments have temporarily cured Barnabas of the vampire curse. Meanwhile, Roger Collins starts to become obsessed with the portrait of Angelique and occasionally believes he is Joshua Collins. Under the spell of the portrait, Roger uses black magic in an attempt to kill Dr. Lang. Barnabas feels he is regressing back into a vampire; however, Dr. Lang believes he has a way to permanently cure him. Roger mysteriously leaves Collinwood in the middle of the night with the portrait of Angelique and when he returns, he is now married to a woman named Cassandra Blair. Everyone reacts with shock at the suddenness on the marriage. Barnabas and Victoria both recognize that Cassandra is really Angelique in disguise. Dr. Lang shows Barnabas a body which he plans to transfer Barnabas’ life force into so he escape Angelique's curse. Angelique comes to Barnabas in a dream and tells him she will turn him back into a vampire through a dream curse; a shared dream that increases in terror as it is passed from one person to another until it reaches its intended victim. Angelique as Cassandra starts the dream curse, she chooses Maggie Evans to be the first to have it. In the dream, Maggie is beckoned by Jeff Clark to a room, which has several doors, she opens one of them and finds a skull, she is then compelled to recount the dream to Jeff. He and several others experience the dream, each one more terrifying than the last. Professor Timothy Eliot Stokes plans to stop the dream curse by making himself the beckoner when Carolyn Stoddard experiences the dream. He hypnotizes her, Carolyn has the dream and finds her own grave. Professor Stokes has the dream, breaks all the rules of the curse and Angelique appears to him. When he awakens, Sam Evans shows up believing Professor Stokes has something to tell him. Professor Stokes refuses to tell Sam the dream and doesn't feel compelled by the curse to do. Cassandra gives Sam a potion that will continue the dream curse. Sam starts to tell Victoria the dream, however he dies before he can finish. Cassandra raises Sam's ghost and tells him he will not rest until he tells Victoria the dream. Sam tells Victoria the dream and she experiences it in which Barnabas beckons her, and she sees him collapsed on the floor bleeding at the neck. Barnabas admits defeat to Cassandra and asks her to spare Victoria the effects of the dream if he will try to be a faithful husband. Nicholas Blair, a powerful warlock who serves Diabolos, the same "master" as Angelique, arrives and gets angry with her when he finds that she is considering taking Barnabas up on his offer rather than returning the vampire curse. Victoria attempts to resist the temptation to tell Barnabas the dream, however, he shows up at Collinwood and makes her tell it to him to spare her suffering. Barnabas has the dream, when he awakes there is a knock on the door and a bat attacks him. Barnabas dies but Julia cannot bring herself to drive the stake through his heart when he will rise once again as a vampire. Julia and Willie Loomis bury Barnabas in the woods.
11	The Creation of Adam and Eve	486 to 626	May 6, 1968, to November 18, 1968
Dr. Eric Lang leaves a message on a tape recorder just before he dies; the message explains that if both Barnabas Collins and Adam, Dr. Lang's artificial creation, live, Barnabas will be free from the vampire curse, but if Adam dies Barnabas will revert. Dr. Julia Hoffman and Barnabas conduct Dr. Lang's experiment; when it is over Barnabas is alive, shortly after Adam comes to life. Adam, although a fully grown human, is unable to speak and acts like a child; however, he can be very violent if upset. At dawn, Barnabas finds he is no longer a vampire and has been cured for good. Adam runs off after attacking Barnabas. Barnabas decides he must kill Adam because he is too violent and uncontrollable. Professor Timothy Eliot Stokes secretly helps Adam and teaches him to speak and educates him. Barnabas appears to die, as a result of Angelique Collins' dream curse, at the same time Adam also dies. Professor Stokes gets Julia to examine Adam, who now appears to be dead. Adam revives and appears to be suffocating. Julia suspects that Adam's reactions are tied to Barnabas’, and that Barnabas is suffocating in his grave. Julia and Professor Stokes dig up Barnabas and find he is alive and not a vampire. As Barnabas revives, Adam also recovers. The manipulative Nicholas Blair encourages Adam to lie and cheat to get what he wants. Adam goes to Barnabas and demands he create a woman for him to love. Tom Jennings, a local handyman, finds a coffin in the basement of the house Nicholas has taken up residence in. Tom is attacked in the woods outside Nicholas' house. Barnabas and Julia become troubled when they find Tom has bite marks on his neck. Tom has become a vampire and soon puts Julia under her spell. Barnabas discovers that Tom Jennings is a vampire and after following him to his crypt, kills him for good by driving a wooden stake through his heart. Nicholas opens the coffin in the basement revealing that he has turned Angelique into a vampire. Nicholas plans to use Adam as a template to create a race of man-made humans who will serve his “master". Adam tells Barnabas and Julia that they are taking too long in creating his mate and gives them four weeks or he will kill everyone at Collinwood. Angelique schemes so that she will be the life force for the experiment, in order for her to escape the vampire curse. Barnabas prevents this. Nicholas summons the spirit of Danielle Roget, one of the most evil women that ever lived, so she can be the life force. The experiment to create Adam mate Eve is a success. Eve tells Nicholas that she hates Adam. Julia, Barnabas and Stokes hold a séance to find out more about Danielle Roget. The spirit of Danielle Roget's lover, Phillippe Cordier, attacks Adam, Barnabas also suffers. Barnabas plans to kill Eve. Nicholas learns this and sets up a trap for him. Angelique bites Barnabas placing him under her control. Eve tells Jeff Clark that he is really Peter Bradford and that she knows him from somewhere. Angelique sends Eve back in time so she can find out more about Peter. In 1795, Eve sees him on the night he is to be hanged. She offers to help him escape from prison if he will go away with her. He turns down Eve's help and is hanged. Adam finds that Eve really loves Peter; he then kills her. Adam then attempts to resurrect Eve by using Victoria's life energy by re-conducting the experiment on his own, but Julia and Barnabas stop him, destroying Eve's body, saving Victoria, and shooting Adam in his shoulder. Adam flees to the home of Professor Stokes who treats his gunshot wound and offers to take Adam away from Collinsport to a clinic to have his facial scars removed and from there to begin a new life for himself elsewhere.
12	The Werewolf and the Ghost of Quentin	627 to 700	November 19, 1968, to February 28, 1969
Chris Jennings arrives in Collinsport with the intention of finding out how his brother Tom Jennings died. Chris meets with his young sister Amy Jennings who has been at Windcliff Sanitarium since the death of Tom. Chris is disturbed by the news that a full moon will be that night. Strange noises can be heard in Chris’ room at the Collinsport Inn, and the innkeeper is attacked and killed. Whilst in the woods Elizabeth Collins Stoddard hears a growling noise coming toward her. Amy appears and “whatever it was” goes away. Elizabeth describes “it” as an animal dressed as a man. David Collins shows Amy the West wing of Collinwood, she talks to a ghost named Quentin Collins on an old telephone they find. Chris cuts short a date with Carolyn Stoddard in order to go back to his room where he turns into a werewolf. During a séance, the spirit of a woman named Magda Rakosi speaks through Carolyn with a warning. Chris interrupts the séance before anything substantial can be learned. David and Amy return to the West wing where several strange things happen to them; they discover a sealed off room belonging to Quentin. In the secret room they find a skeleton. They get a cradle from the Old House and put it in the secret room, as they were “instructed” to. They plan to play "the game” with Quentin and his ghost along with that of Beth Chavez, a servant at Collinwood during the latter part of the 19th century. Amy and David dress up and pretend to be Beth and Quentin. They bury the skeleton from the secret room and David strings a wire across the staircase, causing Roger Collins to fall down the stairs. Meanwhile, Professor Timothy Eliot Stokes believes that Collinwood is possessed and brings Janet Findley, a medium, to investigate. David and Amy warn Quentin that Janet Findley's arrival. Janet sees the sign of the pentagram in Joe Haskell's face. She warns Joe to be careful of an animal that walks as a man. David and Amy trick Janet into going through the secret passage from the drawing room to the west wing. She discovers Quentin's room and is tormented by his spirits while trapped in there. When Janet next appears she falls down the stairs to her death. Joe learns Chris is a werewolf and shoots Chris after he changes; however, the bullets do not injure him. Joe goes insane and kidnaps Amy to “protect” her from Chris. Dr. Julia Hoffman has Joe sent to Windcliff for treatment. Julia and Barnabas Collins also discover that Chris is a werewolf. Barnabas locks Chris in the secret room in the Collins mausoleum so he will not be able to hurt anyone when he transforms. David visits and distracts Chris while Quentin poisons his drink. The ghost of Beth leads Julia and Barnabas to the Cottage where they find Chris dying. David tells Quentin he does not want to play "the game" anymore, Quentin touches his arm and makes it feel like it is on fire. Maggie Evans hears David screaming and the sound of a man's laughter. Ned Stuart shows up at Collinwood looking for Chris and reveals that Chris was engaged to his sister, Sabrina Stuart. Chris and Julia visit Sabrina and find she has been in a state of shock for the last two years since the last time she saw Chris. The ghost of Quentin chases everyone out of Collinwood and into the Old House. Barnabas and Julia go to the mausoleum to release Chris, however, he is still a werewolf despite the absence of a full moon. Julia thinks there must be some connection between the ghost of Quentin and Chris’ werewolf condition. While searching Quentin's room, Professor Stokes finds I-Ching wands and is convinced they may be the key to understanding Quentin. Maggie goes to Collinwood to find David, when she does he falls unconscious; later Julia informs everyone that David is in a coma and will die soon.
13	Return to 1795	657 to 667	December 31, 1968, to January 14, 1969
Josette Collins' music box opens by itself and starts to play. Maggie Evans finds a message inside it from someone pleading for help. David Collins takes a photograph of Barnabas Collins and Carolyn Stoddard, when David develops the film a picture of Victoria Winters being hung can be seen in the background. Barnabas is sure Victoria is in trouble and needs his help. He decides he has to find a way to travel back to 1796 to save Victoria from the gallows. The graves of Victoria and Peter Bradford are discovered which prompts Barnabas to calls out to their spirits. This causes him to return to 1796, once again a vampire. Barnabas plans to change the course of history by saving Victoria from her fate. He bites Nathan Forbes and forces him to write a confession saying that he lied in his testimony at Victoria's witch trial. Forbes confession is only able to release Peter from jail, Victoria will still be hanged. Unable to resist his vampire nature, Barnabas attacks a woman named Crystal Cabot at the docks, she falls into the water and drowns. Upon returning to Collinwood, Barnabas finds Crystal's body in the study, it turns out to be Angelique Collins. She agrees to help save Victoria if he will resume their marriage. Victoria is hung and pronounced dead. Angelique plans to keep her in a state of suspended animation, and never release her. Barnabas sets Angelique on fire, finally destroying her and releasing Victoria from her curse. Victoria and Peter leave Collinsport together to begin a new life for themselves, having decided to remain in the year 1796. Barnabas asks Ben Stokes to chain him in his coffin so he may return to the present. Nathan and Natalie du Pres plan to drive a stake through Barnabas’ heart. Ben kills Nathan and Natalie before they can harm Barnabas. In the present, Willie Loomis and Dr. Julia Hoffman wait for Barnabas to return, however, he never does. Willie checks the Collins mausoleum but Barnabas is not in the coffin; shortly after Willie leaves, the chains re-appear around the coffin and Barnabas is trapped inside. Josette appears to Willie, crying; he is convinced that this is a sign of Barnabas' return. Willie and Julia release Barnabas from the coffin, who is relieved to discover that he is human once again.
14	1897	700 to 884	February 28, 1969, to November 13, 1969
In an attempt to save David Collins from the ghost of Quentin, Barnabas Collins uses the I-Ching wands to make a mental journey which transports his consciousness back in time to 1897. In this year, Quentin Collins returns to Collinwood after some time away. Quentin's grandmother Edith Collins, the mistress of Collinwood, is on her death bed and is expected to tell the family secret to the next in line, her grandson and Quentin's older brother, Edward Collins. Barnabas materializes in his coffin at the Collins family crypt and is released by a Gypsy handyman and con artist, named Sandor Rakosi, whom Barnabas (a vampire once again) bites him and makes Sandor his human slave and daytime protector. Barnabas then arrives at Collinwood and introduces himself as a cousin from England (as he did in the contemporary time back in 1967), and then begins to investigate Quentin. Quentin attempts to learn the family secret from Edith by threatening her. Edward returns to Collinsport with a new governess, Rachel Drummond, for his children Jamison and Nora Collins. Barnabas meets with Edith; she is shocked and declares that he is the family secret; the vampire son of the late Joshua and Naomi Collins imprisoned in a coffin in the family crypt. She is unable to tell Edward the secret and dies. Quentin plans to make sure that he gets something in Edith's will even if he has to have it changed; he finds out from Magda Rakosi, a Gypsy and Edith's fortune teller and the wife of Sandor, that the will is hidden in Edith's coffin. Quentin is tormented by the ghost of Edith; she warns him to return the will. Evan Hanley, the Collins family lawyer and a Satanist, approaches Sandor to hire him to help forge a new will. In order to stop Barnabas from interfering with their plans, Quentin and Evan hold a ceremony which brings the witch Angelique Collins back into existence. Judith Collins, Quentin's older sister, finds Edith's real will and learns that Edith has left her everything. She is the new mistress of Collinwood. At Edward's request, Reverend Gregory Trask shows up to take Nora and Jamison to his boarding school, Worthington Hall. Rachel is very upset by his presence. She tells Barnabas that she used to live and work at Worthington Hall and was intimidated and blackmailed into staying there by Gregory. Barnabas also meets and bites Charity Trask, Gregory Trask's daughter, and makes her his slave to keep tabs on Reverend Trask and of his intentions. Edward arranges to have the children sent to Worthington Hall. Tim Shaw, one of the teachers, comes to pick up the children, he tells Rachel that he had been accused of murdering Gregory's brother-in-law and has also been blackmailed into working at the school. Gregory accuses Rachel of stealing and warns her to come back with him. Minerva Trask, Gregory's wife, shows up to take Rachel back to Worthington Hall; she accuses her of being an accessory to the murder of her brother. Minerva threatens to go to the police if Rachel does not go back with her. While continuing to investigate Quentin Collins, Barnabas meets Edward's estranged wife Laura Collins, who ran away to Egypt with Quentin some years ago. Barnabas recognizes Laura as the Phoenix from his lifetime in the 18th century and she has returned to reclaim her children, Jamison and Nora. Laura sets fire to Worthington Hall to reclaim the children. Quentin teams up with Barnabas to investigate Laura and find a way to stop her from taking Jamison and Nora away. Laura then meets Dirk Wilkins, a Collinwood employee, to do her bidding while Quentin teams up with Barnabas' rival Angelique to fight against Laura's powers, which eventually ends with Angelique turning Laura into an old version of herself and being burned alive (as in the 1967 storyline Laura the Phoenix), saving Jamison and Nora. Things take a turn when Dirk Wilkins discovers that Barnabas is a vampire. Barnabas attacks him; Dirk dies and rises as a vampire. Dirk attacks Judith; under his control she shoots and kills Rachel. Edward follows Judith, finds Dirk's coffin and kills him by driving a wooden stake through his heart. Meanwhile, Gregory gets Evan Hanley to brainwash Tim to kill on command. They have him kill Minerva. Gregory asks Judith to marry him, she agrees and they are married that night. With Evan's help, Gregory summons up the spirit of Minerva in order to make Judith think she is going insane. She is committed to a sanitarium, giving Gregory full control over the Collins estate. Meanwhile, it is revealed that Quentin's insane wife, Jenny Collins, is being secretly kept in the tower room at Collinwood. She escapes and stabs Quentin to death. Angelique raises Quentin from the dead and he wanders around the house as a zombie. Gregory performs a ceremony and Quentin is returned to normal and is alive and well. Quentin promises Beth that he will get his marriage to Jenny annulled and will marry her. Laura Collins finds and releases Jenny from her cell where she finds Quentin and Beth together in the west wing and prepares to stab them both; however, Quentin strangles Jenny to death. Magda, Jenny's sister, places a curse on Quentin to avenge her death. Quentin changes into the werewolf during the full moon while Beth watches. Regretting her actions, Magda returns to Collinsport with the Hand of Count Andreas Petofi, a magical talisman, hoping that it will cure Quentin of the werewolf curse. Victor Fenn-Gibbon arrives at Collinwood searching for the Hand. Quentin and Victor struggle causing Victor's glove to come off revealing that he has no right hand, Magda and Quentin realize Victor is actually Count Petofi. Petofi emerges with the hand re-attached. Charles Delaware Tate, an artist, is commissioned by Count Petofi to paint a portrait of Quentin. Barnabas and Magda find the portrait of Quentin as the werewolf and deduce it has cured Quentin of the curse, and thus erasing the timeline of Quentin's spirit haunting Collinwood. Barnabas attempts to return to 1969 using the I-Ching, however, Edward disrupts Barnabas’ I-Ching trance causing his body in 1969 to disappear. Now trapped in the year 1897, Barnabas writes a letter explaining everything and leaves it to be found in the future. In 1969, Dr. Julia Hoffman reads the letter and goes to Collinwood to find out more about Quentin. The ghost of Beth explains to Julia that she killed Quentin back in 1897. Julia uses the I-Ching wands to travel back to 1897. Events unfold just as Julia had learned, however Count Petofi intervenes and stops Beth before she kills Quentin. Julia is able to see David Collins’ funeral in 1969, she sees David come alive and the ghosts of Quentin and Beth have gone. Count Petofi forces Julia to tell him that the I-Ching wands are the key to time travel. He realizes he must have a body in the future if he wishes to travel there. He causes Beth to see a vision of the future and Quentin is there. Julia starts to feel strange and hears voices from 1969. She is called back and disappears. Count Petofi enters a trance, which causes his and Quentin's minds to switch bodies. He tells Quentin that he will be using his body to travel to the future. He then enters the I-Ching trance and arrives in 1969, however, Beth disrupts it and causes him to return to 1897. Still in the body of Quentin, he finds the hand isn't working anymore. Its power is back in his original body that Quentin inhabits. Quentin uses the powers of the hand to switch bodies back with Count Petofi. The vengeful ghost of Garth Blackwood sets Charles's studio on fire with Count Petofi inside; he is presumed dead. Judith returns from the sanitarium, she tells Edward that Gregory never visited her while there. Realizing she has been manipulated by Gregory for her money, she has Tim wall him up in Quentin's room. He goes insane and shoots himself. Meanwhile, Kitty Soames arrives up at Collinwood. Barnabas is surprised by her resemblance to Josette Collins. At the Old House, Kitty comes to Barnabas believing that she is Josette. Suddenly she fades away into Josette's portrait.
15	The Leviathans	885 to 980	November 14, 1969, to March 27, 1970
Barnabas Collins follows Kitty Soames through the portrait of Josette Collins to 1797, whilst there he is abducted by two strange robed beings, named Oberon and Haza, who are known as Leviathans. They perform a ceremony over Barnabas and give him the Leviathan 'naga' Box which he is to give to the "chosen ones". Oberon and Haza tell Barnabas that a new and powerful leader will be coming. Barnabas returns to 1969 with the Leviathan box and begins acting strangely. Philip and Megan Todd, proprietors of the local antiques store, show up at the Old House; Barnabas knows they are the chosen ones. He gives the Todds the Leviathan box, when they open it sounds as if something has escaped. The Todds care for a mysterious new infant and then care for a boy named Alexander who is apparently their nephew. David Collins and Elizabeth Collins Stoddard go to the antique shop to find Michael, who is the Leviathan child now older. Philip finds the Leviathan has escaped from “the room”. Paul Stoddard, Carolyn Stoddard's father, is attacked and killed by the Leviathan creature. The sheriff investigates Paul's death; he goes to the antique shop and goes to search “the room”. The sheriff goes in and finds a man named Jeb Hawkes, he claims the Todds are renting the room to him. Jeb changes to his true Leviathan form and kills the sheriff. Dr. Julia Hoffman encounters Angelique Collins who has given up her powers and married a wealthy businessman named Sky Rumson. Barnabas explains everything he knows about the Leviathans to Julia; that they have threatened to make him a vampire again; and that Jeb plans to take Carolyn as his bride. Carolyn is terrified after seeing Jeb in his true form. Jeb decides he wants Carolyn to come to him willingly; he does not want to force his true nature upon her. Jeb turns Barnabas back into a vampire for being disloyal to the Leviathan cause. Nicholas Blair arrives to make sure his plan for the Leviathans' domination of humanity succeeds. Barnabas learns Sky is a member of the Leviathan cult; Angelique does not believe him until Nicholas shows up. Nicholas forces Sky to choose between the Leviathans and Angelique. Sky tries to set Angelique on fire, but she uses her powers to choke him and makes her escape. Sky forces Julia into “the room” where Jeb is in his true form. Jeb asks Julia to cure him, so he will not have to change into his true form. Carolyn tells Jeb she loves him. Jeb smashes the Leviathan box and the Leviathan altar is destroyed. Angelique puts a shadow on Jeb that will follow and destroy him. Jeb and Carolyn marry and make plans to leave Collinsport. Jeb begs Angelique to stop the shadow from following him. Barnabas asks Angelique to help Jeb for Carolyn's sake. Angelique tells Jeb how he can transfer the shadow to someone else. Jeb puts the shadow on Nicholas, after which it attacks and kills him. Nicholas’ ghost tells Sky that he must kill Jeb for betraying him. Sky kills Jeb Hawkes by pushing him off Widows' Hill. Carolyn has a dream in which Jeb tells her he loves her and that they will meet again.
16	Quentin and Amanda	904 to 934	December 12, 1969, to January 22, 1970
Barnabas Collins hits a strange man with his car; he looks exactly like Quentin Collins from 1897. The stranger introduces himself as Grant Douglas; however, Dr. Julia Hoffman is convinced he is Quentin reincarnated. Olivia Corey, an actress, becomes interested in helping Grant when she finds he is in the hospital and cannot remember who he is. She is upset to find he does not recognize her. She admits to Julia that she really is Amanda Harris, Quentin's lost love from 1897. She reveals she committed suicide when Quentin left her; however, a Mr. Best gave her another chance to be with Quentin if she could win his love. Mr. Best returns and gives Amanda seven days to live unless she can win Quentin's love. Julia finds Quentin's portrait, which has been painted over. She has it restored and shows it to Grant. After seeing the painting, Grant realizes that he is Quentin and remembers Amanda. Mr. Best catches up with Amanda and tells her that her time is up; she begs for a little more time. Mr. Best tells Quentin if he and Amanda can escape from his domain without touching each other, they can be together forever. They encounter several traps and Amanda slips while trying to cross a bridge. Quentin touches Amanda while trying to help her, causing her to be killed by falling rocks.
17	1970 Parallel Time	980 to 1060	March 27, 1970, to July 17, 1970
Barnabas Collins enters a room in the east wing and finds himself in a parallel universe of 1970 where Quentin Collins is the master of Collinwood and his wife Angelique Stokes has recently died. Quentin has just married Maggie Evans, whom most of the Collins family disapprove of. William Loomis, the alternate version of Willy Loomis, is a struggling writer living in the Old House on the Collinwood grounds and is married to Carolyn. William soon learns of Barnabas' secret of being a vampire and imprisons him in his own coffin in the basement of the Old House for several weeks. During this, Alexis Stokes, Angelique's twin sister, arrives at Collinwood. Alexis is terrified when the piano in Angelique's room plays by itself, she is convinced her sister is still at Collinwood in spirit. During an excursion to Angelique's grave, her body is found to be perfectly preserved in her coffin, despite being dead six months. Alexis goes to Angelique's coffin, when she touches the body Angelique awakens and switches places with Alexis. Quentin has Angelique's coffin cremated not knowing that it now contains the real Alexis. Angelique determined to find the person responsible for her death poses as her twin sister. During this, Barnabas is freed from his coffin and turns the tables on William, making him his daytime protector/slave as in the real 1970 time. Barnabas soon discovers that “Alexis” is really Angelique. Meanwhile, Cyrus Longworth, a scientist friend of Quentin, is conducting experiments that will separate the good and evil in people. He drinks the formula that he has been working on which causes himself to transform into a dark-haired, mustachioed, evil being who names himself 'John Yaeger'. In his 'Yaeger' persona, he terrorizes several of the inhabitants of Collinsport including his assistant Sabrina. Yaeger later kidnaps Maggie Evans and keeps her captive in the basement of an old farmhouse. Cyrus, feeling bad about what he has done, tells Barnabas where Maggie is, then prepares to kill himself, however, he changes back into Yaeger. Yeager goes to Maggie and prepares to kill her. Barnabas saves Maggie and kills Yaeger, as he dies he changes back to Cyrus. The parallel version of Dr. Julia Hoffman, who is the housekeeper at Collinwood, learns Barnabas is a vampire and prepares to drive a stake through his heart. The original version of Julia Hoffman shows up and kills parallel Julia, saving Barnabas. Original Julia assumes the identity of parallel Julia in order to learn Angelique's plans. Julia finds a person, called Roxanne Drew, who is being used to keep Angelique alive. Angelique goes weak whenever Roxanne regains consciousness. Roger Collins, becoming increasingly unstable, reveals he was the one who killed Angelique. Roger then murders Carolyn as well as Elizabeth. Angelique then kills Roger by draining him of his life energy warmth. Roxanne regains consciousness, which causes Angelique to die. Timothy Stokes, Angelique's stepfather, sets fire to Collinwood to avenge Angelique's death and commits suicide by allowing the flames to consume him. Quentin and Maggie manage to escape the burning Collinwood, but Roxanne is trapped inside the house while Barnabas and Julia are trapped in the parallel time room; it sends them back to their own timeline.
18	1995	1061 to 1070	July 20, 1970, to July 31, 1970
Barnabas Collins and Dr. Julia Hoffman find they have not returned to their own timeline but to the future in 1995 where Collinwood is in ruins. They encounter Mrs. Sarah Johnson, the Collinwood housekeeper, now an old woman, and discover that David Collins died in 1970. They find an aged Carolyn living in a small house on the property. Carolyn is half insane and refusing to answer any of their questions about what happened to Collinwood. Julia goes to the records office in town who suspiciously claims that all records about the Collins family have been destroyed. Whilst inside the remains of Collinwood, Julia is almost killed by a falling statue, and a strange ghostly man can be seen staring out from one of the windows. They later find out from Mrs. Johnson that something happened at the playroom in Collinwood; Mrs. Johnson is stopped from continuing by the ghost of Gerard Stiles. Barnabas and Julia follow Carolyn to the playroom, where they hear music playing. A mentally unstable Quentin Collins claims that Professor Timothy Eliot Stokes attempted an exorcism of Collinwood back in 1970 which caused Gerard's anger and the destruction of Collinwood. Carolyn agrees to tell everything that happened, however, she is found dead at Collinwood. Barnabas finds an incoherent note Carolyn was writing before she died, it details six events which herald the destruction of Collinwood: The night of the sun and the moon; the picnic; the unfinished horoscope; the night I sang my song; the destruction of Rose Cottage; and the murder. The ghost of Carrie Stokes leads Barnabas and Julia from the playroom to a stairway into time that returns them back to present day 1970.
19	The Ghosts of Daphne and Gerard - The Summer of 1970 Haunting	1070 to 1109	July 31, 1970, to September 24, 1970
Upon returning to 1970, Barnabas Collins and Dr. Julia Hoffman find there is now a girl named Hallie Stokes, Professor Timothy Eliot Stokes's niece, living at Collinwood. Barnabas discovers that a man named Gerard Stiles lived in Collinsport back in 1840 and that the playroom in 1995 does not exist and is currently a closet. Barnabas and Julia find that there is going to be a lunar eclipse... which is one of the omens that Carolyn Stoddard in 1995 told them of the impending doom. At the peak of the eclipse, David Collins and Hallie hear music coming from the closet and find it now contains the playroom. They encounter the ghost of Daphne Harridge. Carolyn, Maggie Evans, Quentin Collins and David go on a picnic and David takes photos... hence the second omen. David develops the photos he shot and feels there is a strange figure in one of the pictures. The ghost of Gerard watches Carolyn and David looking at the photograph. Julia feels that Gerard haunting the house. She and Barnabas ask Quentin about the ghosts at Collinwood; however, he is unable to help them at the sight of Daphne. She leads him to her grave and is about to stab him in the back but his concern for her appears to cause her to change her mind about killing him. Elizabeth Collins Stoddard goes to see Sebastian Shaw, an astrologer, after becoming concerned that some great tragedy is coming to the Collins family. Carolyn is shocked when she meets Sebastian, who looks exactly like Jeb Hawkes. She has Sebastian prepare a horoscope for her, and asks him many personal questions. He decides not to complete Carolyn's horoscope when he learns that the only reason she asked him to do it was because he looks like Jeb (the third omen). At the same time, Barnabas finds Roxanne Drew, the present time version of Roxanne from the Parallel Time universe, who works as Sebastian's personal assistant, but she has no interest in Barnabas. Unknown to Barnabas, Roxanne is also a vampire and she targets Maggie to feed on her blood to turn her into a vampire (with the implication to make Maggie her lover), and Sebastian is her daytime protector and slave. Barnabas persuades Sebastian to take Maggie away from Collinsport as he tries to find a way to stop Roxanne. Julia finds design plans by a Quentin Collins, a great-uncle relative of Quentin, in 1840 for a stairway into time. Elizabeth talks with Julia about one of the clues which predicts that Carolyn will sing a song, she says that Carolyn cannot sing. Carolyn starts to believe she has second sight and insists on giving a concert; she sings a song (the fourth omen). The ghost of Gerard lures David and Hallie to Rose Cottage and they become possessed by the spirits of Tad Collins and Carrie Stokes from 1840. They hold a ceremony that causes Daphne to come back to life. Daphne attempts to protect them from Gerard. Barnabas and Julia find the location of Rose Cottage, Gerard causes it to burn with them inside. They manage to escape as the building is destroyed by the fire (the fifth omen). Gerard then kills David and Hallie (the sixth and final omen), and summons a small mob of zombies back to life to destroy Collinwood. As Collinwood is destroyed by the rampaging zombies, the stairway into time appears. Julia uses it to escape the ensuing chaos; however, the zombies capture Barnabas.
20	1840	1110 to 1198	September 25, 1970, to January 27, 1971
After escaping from the burning Collinwood, the stairway into time leads Dr. Julia Hoffman to Collinwood in the year 1840. Julia opens Barnabas Collins' coffin, but he does not recognize her and tries to kill her. The elderly Ben Stokes manages to stop him. Barnabas from 1970 soon arrives after using the I-Ching to travel back in time to 1840 to take over his body's mind and rescue Julia. Together they try to find a way to prevent the future destruction of Collinwood from happening. In this timeframe, Gabriel Collins is the paraplegic heir to Collinwood and is married to Edith Collins, both of whom are trying to scam and secure the Collins wealth for themselves and leave everyone else out. Gabriel is secretly revealed that he can walk and is faking his handicap to his advantage. Barnabas, in his vampire form, bites and infects Roxanne Drew, who becomes a vampire and begins a spree of killings and attacks on Collinsport residents... thus explaining how Roxanne became a vampire. Roxanne's older brother Randall arrives in Collinsport and after learning from Barnabas about Roxanne, he manages to stop her from entering her coffin during the daytime and lets the sunlight burn her to dust. Desmond Collins returns to Collinsport from a few years abroad with the disembodied head of Judah Zachary, a powerful warlock, to give to his cousin Quentin Collins, who was presumed lost at sea and has now returned. Desmond discovers a secret cave in a graveyard containing a mask encrusted with jewels along with Judah's decapitated body. Julia falls under the power of Judah. She is to join the head and the body. Judah's body is destroyed in a fire and Julia is released from his power. Gerard Stiles, a friend of Quentin's, is forced to put the mask on and Judah takes possession of him. Judah posing as Gerard plans to get revenge on the Collins family for his death. Quentin shows an interest in Daphne Harridge whom he hires as governess to Tad Collins and Carrie Stokes, which prompts jealousy in his shrewd wife Samantha. Both Quentin and Daphne begin to receive notes which they suspect to be from Daphne's late sister Joanna Mills who was romantically involved with Quentin before her mental breakdown and death. They make several efforts to contact Joanna's ghost for answers, but receive no reply. Joanna Mills is later revealed to be alive when she shows up at Collinwood to visit her sister Daphne, which prompts fear in Samantha because she supposedly murdered Joanna by pushing her off the cliff at Widow's Hill. Samantha is revealed to have sent the letters to Quentin and Daphne having forged Joanna's handwriting to drive them apart. Joanna is revealed to be a revenant who has returned from the dead to kill Samantha to avenge her own death, which she accomplishes by the same way of pushing Samantha off Widow's Hill to her own death. Meanwhile, Angelique Collins returns to Collinwood with her Gypsy bodyguard Laszlo Ferrari where she discovers that Barnabas is free and she blackmails him into posing as her husband, which Angelique introduces herself as 'Valerie Collins' to the rest of the Collins family. After learning about Judah's severed head, Angelique remembers that her real name is Miranda DuVal, a follower of Judah Zachery who testified against him in a witch trial in 1692. Amadeus Collins was a judge at Judah's trial, he was convicted and swore to put a curse on the Collins family. The elderly and senile Daniel Collins, the master of Collinwood, soon dies after having an argument with Gabriel and in his will leaves Gerard control of the Collins fortune until Quentin and Samantha's son, Tad, is 21 years old, however if Quentin is proven innocent of witchcraft then the fortune will revert to him. Gabriel then decides to try to acquire the Collins family wealth first by murdering Edith, and then holds Daphne captive. But the ghost of Daniel Collins appears and drives Gabriel to his own death by having him fall off a rampart at the Collinwood tower to his death, thus saving the Collins family from further harm. Judah and Lamar Trask, an undertaker and son of the late Reverend Trask from 1795, suspect Barnabas might be a vampire. They find Ben's diary which leads them to find the Reverend Trask's skeleton in the basement of the Old House. They learn that Barnabas was responsible for his death. Judah goes to the Old House in the daytime with the intention of staking Barnabas. However, he appears before Judah unharmed by the daylight. It is revealed that Angelique lifted the vampire curse from Barnabas and made him human once again. She claims she did it only for his love and no other reason. Quentin is arrested and tried for witchcraft. Charles Dawson, a follower of Judah Zachary, is the prosecutor in the case. Desmond is Quentin's defense lawyer. Leticia Faye, a psychic friend of the eccentric writer Flora Collins, is forced to testify where she reveals that Desmond brought the head of Judah to Collinsport for Quentin which implicates Desmond in Quentin's witchcraft charge. The judges find them both guilty and sentence them to be beheaded. Judah punishes Angelique for her betrayal by taking away her powers making her human again. She brings the head of Judah to Quentin and Desmond's execution and explains that Gerard is possessed by Judah and the one responsible for everything happening. Desmond grabs a gun from one of the guards and shoots Gerard, killing him along with Judah, the head of Judah changes into a skull and the spell is broken. Quentin and Desmond are released and all charges are dropped. Barnabas realizes he loves Angelique and goes to tell her, however, Lamar arrives and shoots her dead after figuring out that she was a witch. Barnabas chases and stabs Lamar, who then stumbles into the Parallel Time room at Collinwood where he soon dies from his stab wound in the alternate 1841. With their task accomplished, Barnabas and Julia, along with Professor Stokes (who also arrived from the future to assist them) use Quentin's stairway into time and arrive safely back at Collinwood in 1971. They meet with Elizabeth Collins Stoddard and find that everything is normal; David Collins is alive, Collinwood still exists, Barnabas is human once again, and the Collins' destiny is saved. Back in 1841, Desmond destroys the stairway into time by smashing it with an ax to ensure that it can never be used again.
21	1841 Parallel Time	1186 to 1245	January 11, 1971, to April 2, 1971
In the alternate reality of 1841 where Barnabas Collins never became a vampire but lived and died as a human, the entire Collins family is under a curse that requires them to hold a lottery, and the loser is to spend one night in a room that will leave them either dead or insane. Justin Collins, the elderly master of Collinwood, is dying which means the lottery will be held again soon. Barnabas' son, Bramwell Collins, returns after five years of living abroad and is hoping to become the new master of Collinwood following Justin's impending death. Bramwell's cousin, Morgan Collins, and Catherine Harridge get married. Quentin Collins finds that the plague hit Collinsport in the past when the family refused to go through with the lottery. The lottery is held, Gabriel Collins is chosen. However, Gabriel pays a friend, named Tim Braithwaite, to switch places with him in the room shortly after entering, who dies as a result. Shortly after, Justin Collins’ ghost warns the family that the lottery must be held again as only a Collins is able to break the family curse. The lottery is held again, and this time, Catherine is chosen. Morgan locks himself in the room before Catherine can be taken there to spend the night. Morgan survives, however, he is now possessed by the spirit of James Forsythe. In a short flashback to the year 1680, Brutus Collins was stealing money from his business partner James Forsythe who was having an affair with his wife Amanda. Brutus kills James and Amanda and then sets the curse on Collinwood, only the person capable of surviving a night in the locked room would be worthy of the Collins name. Back in 1841, Brutus warns that the lottery must be held again; Kendrick Young, Melanie Collins husband, is chosen. Meanwhile, after discovering that Catherine is carrying Bramwell Collins' child, Morgan knocks out Bramwell and locks him in the room instead. Morgan agrees to let Bramwell out after Catherine's pleas; however, he tricks her by locking her in with Bramwell. Catherine and Bramwell survive Brutus’ final attempts to destroy them. Brutus declares they have won and the curse is broken. Morgan shoots Bramwell and takes Catherine hostage. Bramwell and Kendrick go after him, they fight and Morgan falls off the roof of Collinwood to his death. Bramwell is declared the new master of Collinwood. The series suddenly ends with a closing narration by none other than Thayer David who portrayed Matthew Morgan, Ben Stokes, Professor T. Elliot Stokes, Sandor Rakosi, Count Petofi, Timothy Stokes (Parallel Time), Mordecai Grimes, and Ben Stokes (Parallel Time), which reveals that Bramwell and Catherine got married and lived happily ever after. "And that for as long as they lived, the Dark Shadows at Collinwood were but a memory of the distant past."
