= Checkmate (American TV series) =

1960 American TV series

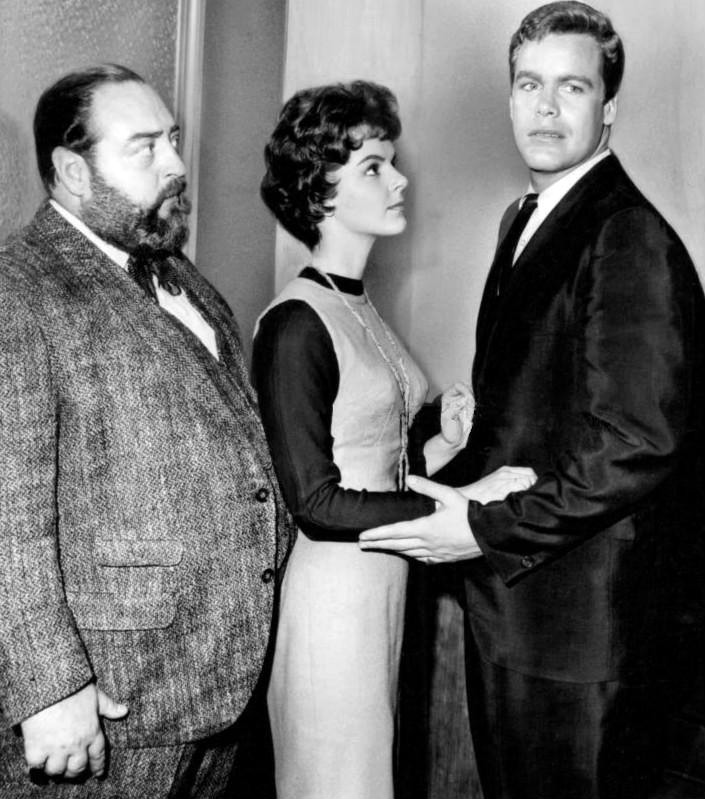
- Sebastian Cabot, Carolyn Craig, and Doug McClure in episode "Trial By Midnight" (1962).
- Genre: Detective/Mystery
- Created by: Eric Ambler
- Directed by: Frank Arrigo; Jules Bricken; Herschel Daugherty; Walter Doniger; Robert Florey; William A. Graham; Tom Gries; Douglas Heyes; James Wong Howe; Robert Ellis Miller; Alexander Singer; Don Taylor; Don Weis
- Starring: Anthony George; Sebastian Cabot; Doug McClure
- Theme music composer: John Williams
- Composers: Marty Paich; Pete Rugolo; Morton Stevens; John Williams; Stanley Wilson
- Country of origin: United States
- Original language: English
- No. of seasons: 2
- No. of episodes: 70

Production
- Producers: Richard Berg; Herbert Coleman; Joseph T. Naar
- Cinematography: Joseph F. Biroc; Dale Deverman; Ray Flin; Lionel Lindon; Fred Mandl; John L. Russell; Bud Thackery; John F. Warren
- Editors: Howard Epstein; Lee Huntington; Tony Martinelli
- Running time: 60 mins.
- Production companies: JaMco Productions; Revue Studios

Original release
- Network: CBS
- Release: September 17, 1960 – September 1, 1962

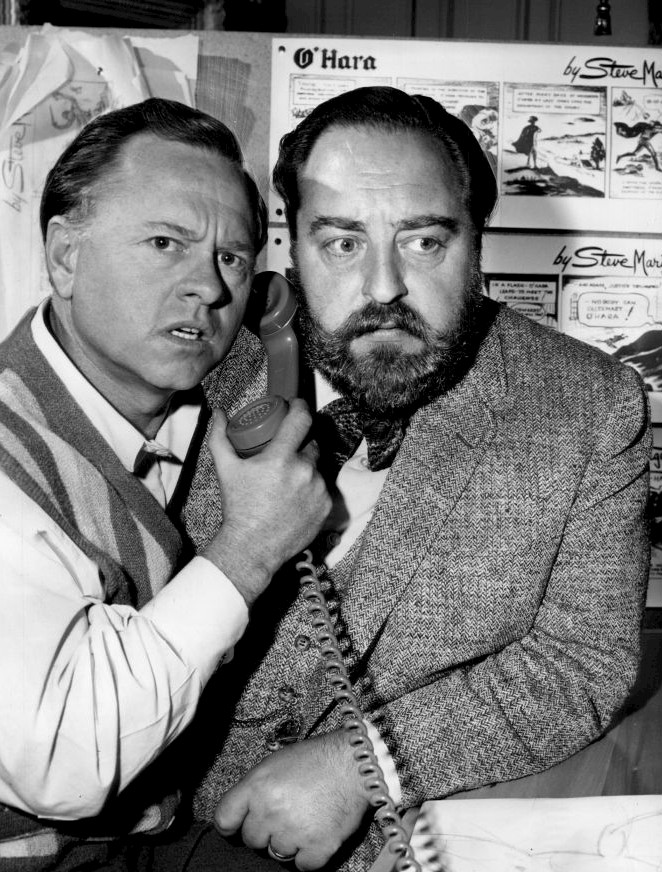
Mickey Rooney and Sebastian Cabot in "The Paper Killer" (1961)

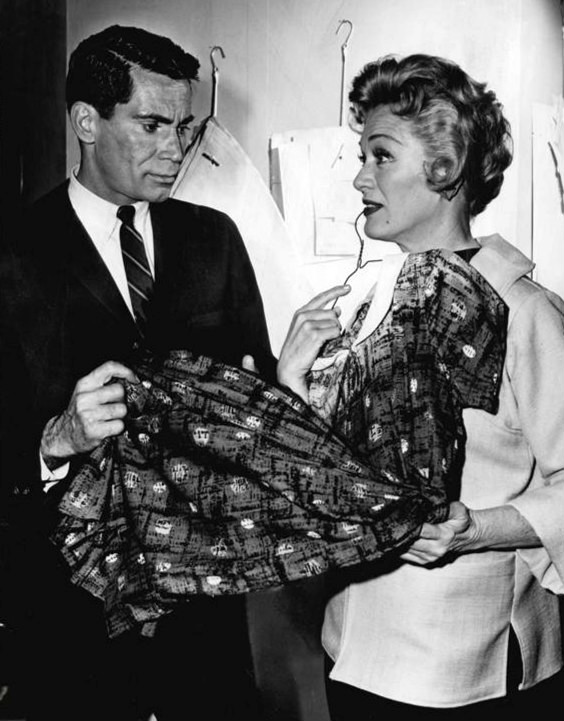
Anthony George and Eve Arden in "Death by Design" (1961)

Checkmate is an American detective television series created by Eric Ambler, featuring Anthony George, Sebastian Cabot, and Doug McClure. The show was broadcast by CBS Television from 1960 to 1962 for a total of 70 episodes. It was produced by Jack Benny's production company, "JaMco Productions" in co-operation with Revue Studios. Guest actors included Charles Laughton, Peter Lorre, Lee Marvin, Mickey Rooney and many other prominent performers.

== Synopsis ==
The program chronicles the cases of a San Francisco detective agency named Checkmate, Inc. Don Corey and Jed Sills manage the agency, which specializes in preventing crimes before they happen, from Corey's stylish apartment supposedly at 3330 Union Street. Sebastian Cabot portrays Dr. Hyatt, a college professor whom they employ as an adviser. Dr. Hyatt's dachshund, Bismarck, occasionally appears. Ken Lynch plays frequently as a police contact person, Lt. Thomas Brand.

== Cast ==
- Anthony George as Don Corey.
- Sebastian Cabot as Dr. Carl Hyatt.
- Doug McClure as Jed Sills.
- Ken Lynch as Lt. Thomas Brand.
- Jack Betts as Chris Devlin.

=== Notable guest actors ===
- Philip Abbott in "Trial by Midnight" (1962)
- Anna Maria Alberghetti in "Runaway" (1960)
- Julie Adams in "Face in the Window" (1960)
- Dana Andrews in "Trial by Midnight" (1962)
- Eve Arden in "Death by Design" (1961)
- John Astin in

- "The Yacht Club Gang" (1962),
- "So Beats My Plastic Heart" (1962)

- Anne Baxter in "Death Runs Wild" (1960)
- Ralph Bellamy in "Portrait of a Man Running" (1961)
- Jack Benny in "A Funny Thing Happened on the Way to the Game" (1962)
- Charles Bickford in "Target Tycoon"(1960)
- Bill Bixby in "To the Best of My Recollection" (1961)
- Scott Brady in "Voyage into Fear" (1961)
- Lloyd Bridges in "The Two of Us" (1961)
- Ellen Burstyn in "The Bold and the Tough" (1962)
- Cyd Charisse in "Dance of Death" (1961)
- Sid Caesar in "Kill the Sound" (1961)
- James Coburn in "A Chant of Silence" (1962)
- Richard Conte in

- "Moment of Truth" (1960),
- "An Assassin Arrives Andante" (1962)

- Joseph Cotten in "Face in the Window" (1960)
- Carolyn Craig in "Trial by Midnight" (1962)
- Norma Crane in "Hour of Execution" (1961)
- John Dehner in "The Heat of Passion" (1961)
- Francis De Sales in "To the Best of My Recollection" (1961)
- Angie Dickinson in "Remembrances of Crimes Past" (1962)
- Donna Douglas in "The Deadly Silence" (1961)
- Buddy Ebsen in "Side by Side" (1962)
- Norman Fell in "Hot Wind in a Cold Town" (1961)
- Joan Fontaine in "Voyage into Fear" (1961)
- Ron Foster in "The Mask of Vengeance" (1960)
- Beverly Garland in "Between Two Guns" (1961)
- James Gregory in "Hour of Execution" (1961)
- Peter Helm in "Rendezvous in Washington" (1960)
- Celeste Holm in "So Beats My Plastic Heart" (1962)
- James Hong in "In a Foreign Quarter" (1962)
- Clegg Hoyt in "The Deadly Silence" (1961)
- Jeffrey Hunter in "Waiting for Jocko" (1961)
- David Janssen in "Ride a Wild Horse" (1962)
- Wright King as Jim Barker in "Portrait of a Man Running" (1961)
- Otto Kruger in "A Funny Thing Happened on the Way to the Game" (1962)
- Martin Landau in

- "Moment of Truth" (1960),
- "Hot Wind in a Cold Town" (1961)

- Charles Laughton in "Terror from the East" (1961)
- Cloris Leachman in "The Mask of Vengeance" (1960)
- Julie London in "Goodbye, Griff" (1961)
- Jack Lord in "The Star System" (1962)
- Peter Lorre in "The Human Touch" (1961)
- Tina Louise in "A Funny Thing Happened on the Way to the Game" (1962)
- Dorothy Malone in "The Heat of Passion" (1961)
- Scott Marlowe in "Brooding Fixation" (1962)
- Lee Marvin in "Jungle Castle" (1961)
- Eve McVeagh in "A Very Rough Sketch" (1962)
- Tyler McVey in

- "Deadly Shadow" (1960),
- "To the Best of My Recollection" (1961), and
- "Side by Side" (1962)

- Vera Miles in "The Crimson Pool" (1961)
- Gary Merrill in "A Matter of Conscious" (1961)
- Ricardo Montalbán in "Hot Wind in a Cold Town" (1961)
- Elizabeth Montgomery in "The Star System" (1962)
- Mary Tyler Moore in "Lady on the Brink" (1960)
- Patricia Neal in "The Yacht Club Gang" (1962)
- Margaret O'Brien in "Deadly Shadow" (1960)
- Dan O'Herlihy in "Referendum on Murder" (1962)
- Susan Oliver in

- "The Thrill Seeker" (1961), and
- "So Beats My Plastic Heart" (1962)

- Eleanor Parker in "The Renaissance of Gussie Hill" (1962)
- Walter Pidgeon in "Death Beyond Recall" (1962)
- Stuart Randall in "The Cyanide Touch" (1960)
- Tony Randall in "The Button Down Break" (1961)
- Madlyn Rhue in "Target Tycoon" (1960)
- Jimmie Rodgers in "Melody for Murder" (1961)
- Mickey Rooney in "The Paper Killer" (1961)
- Janice Rule in "The Mask of Vengeance" (1960)
- Barbara Rush in "The Dark Divide" (1960)
- George Sanders in "The Sound of Nervous Laughter" (1962)
- Dan Sheridan in "A Very Rough Sketch" (1962)
- Dean Stockwell in "Cyanide Touch" (1960)
- Olive Sturgess in "Brooding Fixation" (1962)
- Robert Vaughn in "Interrupted Honeymoon" (1960)
- James Whitmore in "Nice Guys Finish Last" (1961)
- Elen Willard in "Laugh Till I Die" (1961)
- John Williams in "The Murder Game" (1960)
- William Windom in "Through a Dark Glass" (1961)
- Jane Wyman in "Lady on the Brink" (1960)
- Keenan Wynn in "A Slight Touch of Venom" (1961)

== Production ==
Some exterior scenes were filmed in San Francisco.

Series star Anthony George left his recurring role as Federal Agent Cam Allison on The Untouchables (starring Robert Stack), to front this series.

== Episodes ==
=== Season 1 (1960–61) ===
No. overall	No. in season	Title	Directed by	Written by	Original release date
1	1	"Death Runs Wild"	Jules Bricken	Story by : John Kneubuhl; Teleplay by : James Gunn & John Kneubuhl	September 17, 1960
2	2	"Interrupted Honeymoon"	Herschel Daughterty	Michael Morris	September 24, 1960
3	3	"The Cyanide Touch"	Don Weis	Stirling Silliphant	October 1, 1960
4	4	"Lady on the Brink"	Frank Arrigo	Story by : Howard Browne; Teleplay by : Howard Browne & Joel Murcott	October 15, 1960
5	5	"Face in the Window"	Robert Florey	Story by : Leigh Brackett; Teleplay by : Leigh Brackett & Harold Clements	October 22, 1960
6	6	"Runaway"	Don Medford	Story by : Richard Nelson & Steve Fisher; Teleplay by : James Gunn & Richard Nelson	October 29, 1960
7	7	"Target: Tycoon"	Frank Arrigo	Story by : Johnathan Latimer; Teleplay by : Robert Yale Libott	November 5, 1960
8	8	"Deadly Shadow"	Don Weis	Story by : William McGivern; Teleplay by : Harold Clements & William McGivern	November 12, 1960
9	9	"The Dark Divide"	Don Weis	Story by : Robert Bloomfield; Teleplay by : James Gunn & Robert Bloomfield	November 19, 1960
10	10	"Moment of Truth"	Walter Doniger	Story by : Leonard Heideman; Teleplay by : Jameson Brewer & Leonard Heideman	November 26, 1960
11	11	"The Mask of Vengeance"	Ted Post	Warner Law	December 3, 1960
12	12	"The Murder Game"	Douglas Heyes	Douglas Heyes	December 17, 1960
13	13	"The Princess in the Tower"	Herschel Daugherty	Story by : Betty Ulius; Teleplay by : Halsey Melone	December 31, 1960
14	14	"Terror from the East"	Herschel Daugherty	Harold Clements	January 7, 1961
15	15	"The Human Touch"	Don Weis	Story by : John Falvo & Pete Mamakos; Teleplay by : James Gunn	January 14, 1961
16	16	"Hour of Execution"	John English	Story by : Helen Nielsen; Teleplay by : Robert Yale Libott	January 21, 1961
17	17	"Don't Believe a Word She Says"	Sidney Lansfield	Story by : William Lindsay Gresham; Teleplay by : Robert C. Dennis	January 28, 1961
18	18	"Laugh Till I Die"	Don Weis	Bernie Giler	February 4, 1961
19	19	"Between Two Guns"	John English	Harold Clements	February 11, 1961
20	20	"A Matter of Conscience"	Richard Irving	Story by : Leonard Heideman; Teleplay by : Edmund Morris	February 18, 1961
21	21	"Melody for Murder"	Don Taylor	Stuart Jerome	February 25, 1961
22	22	"Phantom Lover"	Herschel Daugherty	Raphael Hayes	March 4, 1961
23	23	"The Gift"	Jules Bricken	Story by : Robert Blees; Teleplay by : Irwin and Gwen Gielgud	March 11, 1961
24	24	"One for the Book"	Don English	Story by : Curtis Kenyon; Teleplay by : Robert C. Dennis	March 18, 1961
25	25	"The Paper Killer"	Don Taylor	Story by : Stuart Jerome; Teleplay by : James Gunn	March 25, 1961
26	26	"Jungle Castle"	Ted Post	Story by : Bernie Giler and Robert C. Dennis; Teleplay by : Robert C. Dennis	April 1, 1961
27	27	"The Deadly Silence"	Paul Stewart	Story by : Rik Vollaerts; Teleplay by : Harold Clements	April 8, 1961
28	28	"Goodbye Griff"	Allen H. Miner	Story by : Steven Thornley; Teleplay by : Steven Thornley and Sheldon Stark	April 15, 1961
29	29	"Dance of Death"	Paul Stewart	Robert Yale Libott	April 22, 1961
30	30	"Voyage Into Fear"	Jules Bricken	Story by : Edmund Morris; Teleplay by : Edmund Morris & Harold Clements	May 6, 1961
31	31	"Tight as a Drum"	Herschel Daugherty	Story by : Edwin Blum; Teleplay by : Edwin Blum and Robert C. Dennis	May 13, 1961
32	32	"Death by Design"	John Newland	Story by : Bob & Wanda Duncan; Teleplay by : Sheldon Stark and Bob & Wanda Duncan	May 20, 1961
33	33	"The Thrill Seeker"	Don Taylor	Stuart Jerome	May 27, 1961
34	34	"Hot Wind in a Cold Town"	Don Weis	Story by : James Lee Barrett; Teleplay by : James Lee Barrett and Dick Berg	June 10, 1961
35	35	"A Slight Touch of Venom"	Earl Bellamy	Story by : James Gunn; Teleplay by : Robert C. Dennis	June 17, 1961
36	36	"State of Shock"	James Wong Howe	Story by : William P. Templeton and Finlay McDermid; Teleplay by : Robert C. Dennis	June 24, 1961

=== Season 2 (1961–62) ===
No. overall	No. in season	Title	Directed by	Written by	Original release date
37	1	"Portrait of a Man Running"	Elliot Silverstein	Richard Fielder	October 4, 1961
38	2	"The Button Down Break"	Paul Stewart	Story by : William Shatner; Teleplay by : Lewis Reed	October 11, 1961
39	3	"The Heat of Passion"	Ron Winston	Story by : Sonya Roberts & Mann Rubin; Teleplay by : Mann Rubin	October 18, 1961
40	4	"Waiting for Jocko"	Don Taylor	Juarez Roberts	October 25, 1961
41	5	"Through a Dark Glass"	Robert Ellis Miller	Richard DeRoy	November 1, 1961
42	6	"Juan Moreno's Body"	Tom Gries	Anthony Spinner	November 8, 1961
43	7	"Kill the Sound"	James Wong Howe	Alfred Brenner	November 15, 1961
44	8	"The Crimson Pool"	Alan Crosland, Jr.	Richard DeRoy	November 22, 1961
45	9	"The Two of Us"	Paul Stewart	Lewis Reed	November 29, 1961
46	10	"Nice Guys Finish Last"	Alan Crosland, Jr.	Larry Cohen	December 13, 1961
47	11	"To the Best of My Recollection"	Paul Stewart	John McGreevey	December 27, 1961
48	12	"A Funny Thing Happened on the Way to the Game"	Don Taylor	Story by : Lewis Reed; Teleplay by : Lewis Reed & Don Taylor	January 3, 1962
49	13	"The Star System"	William Graham	Richard DeRoy	January 10, 1962
50	14	"The Renaissance of Gussie Hill"	Ron Winston	Story by : Oliver Gard; Teleplay by : Oliver Gard & Mark Rodgers	January 17, 1962
51	15	"A Very Rough Sketch"	Ron Winston	Mann Rubin	January 24, 1962
52	16	"The Yacht Club Gang"	Alex Singer	Robert J. Shaw	January 31, 1962
53	17	"Death Beyond Recall"	Herman Hoffman	Max Ehrlich	February 7, 1962
54	18	"The Sound of Nervous Laughter"	Paul Stewart	Story by : Jonathan Latimer; Teleplay by : Jonathan Latimer & Mark Rodgers	February 14, 1962
55	19	"An Assassin Arrives, Andante"	Tom Gries	Story by : Anthony Spinner; Teleplay by : Sy Salkowitz	February 21, 1962
56	20	"Remembrance of Crimes Past"	William Graham	Richard DeRoy	February 28, 1962
57	21	"Heart Is a Handout"	Tom Gries	Sy Salkowitz	March 7, 1962
58	22	"A Brooding Fixation"	Robert Ellis Miller	Story by : Oliver Crawford; Teleplay by : Mark Rodgers & Oliver Crawford	March 14, 1962
59	23	"A Chant of Silence"	William Graham	Richard McCracken	March 21, 1962
60	24	"Trial by Midnight"	Alex Singer	Mark Rodgers	March 28, 1962
61	25	"Ride a Wild Horse"	Byron Paul	Story by : Harold Jack Bloom; Teleplay by : Harold Jack Bloom & Dick Nelson	April 4, 1962
62	26	"So Beats My Plastic Heart"	Bernard Girard	Mark Rodgers	April 11, 1962
63	27	"In a Foreign Quarter"	Robert Ellis Miller	Sy Salkowitz	April 18, 1962
64	28	"Referendum on Murder"	Lewis Allen	John Mantley	April 25, 1962
65	29	"The Someday Man"	Robert Ellis Miller	Richard DeRoy	May 2, 1962
66	30	"Rendezvous in Washington"	William Graham	Mark Rodgers	May 9, 1962
67	31	"The Bold and the Tough"	Don Taylor	Story by : Reuben Bercovitch & Dick Nelson; Teleplay by : Dick Nelson	May 16, 1962
68	32	"Will the Real Killer Please Stand Up?"	Ron Winston	Mark Rodgers	May 23, 1962
69	33	"Down the Gardenia Path"	Ralph Senensky	Robert J. Shaw	June 6, 1962
70	34	"Side by Side"	Robert Ellis Miller	Richard Fielder	June 20, 1962

== Broadcast ==
CBS aired the series on Saturday in the 8:30-9:30 PM time slot from its début on September 17, 1960, until June 24, 1961. The series finished at #21 among all series. It was then reprogrammed to Wednesday in the same time slot from October 4, 1961, to June 20, 1962, where it fell in the ratings opposite The Perry Como Show on NBC. CBS replaced it with The Beverly Hillbillies.

The series was also seen in Canada from 1961 on CTV during that network's initial season.

By 1963, it was re-run in syndication.

== Home media ==
Timeless Media Group has released two "Best of..." collections on DVD in Region 1. Checkmate: The Best of Season 1 was released on October 30, 2009, and Checkmate: The Best of Season 2 was released on March 25, 2008. Timeless Media Group released Checkmate: The Complete Series on 14 DVDs on June 22, 2010 (Region 1).

== Response ==
The series was a critical favorite. In 1961, John J. Lloyd won the show's sole Emmy nomination for Outstanding Achievement in Art Direction and Scenic Design. The icon for this series is swirling liquid shapes at the opening and closing of each episode with theme music by John Williams.

== Comics ==
In 1962, Gold Key Comics published a two-issue comic book run based on the series.
