= Jeremiah Collins =

- Dark Shadows character
- Anthony George portrays Jeremiah
- Portrayed by: Anthony George (1967); Timothy Gordon (1968); Addison Powell (voice) (1968); Alex Stevens (1968); Adrian Paul (1991)
- First appearance: November 21, 1967
- Last appearance: 1991
- Created by: Dan Curtis
In-universe information
- Father: Caleb Collins
- Siblings: Joshua Collins; Abigail Collins
- Wife: Laura Stockbridge (until 1785); Josette du Pres (1795)
- Grandparents: Isaac Collins; Annabella Collins
- Uncles: Theodore Collins
- Nieces and nephews: Barnabas Collins; Sarah Collins
- First cousins: Daniel Collins; Millicent Collins Forbes

Jeremiah Collins is a fictional character played primarily by Anthony George during the 1795 flashback on the ABC television gothic horror soap opera serial Dark Shadows.

== Story ==
The character of Jeremiah Collins (Anthony George) was born in 1763. In the original series, was depicted as the younger brother of Joshua Collins (Louis Edmonds) and Abigail Collins (Clarice Blackburn); also as the brother-in-law to Naomi Collins (Joan Bennett). Jeremiah was an uncle to Sarah Collins (Sharon Smythe) and Barnabas Collins (Jonathan Frid), who intended to marry Josette du Pres (Kathryn Leigh Scott).

However, Barnabas had a last minute fling on Martinique in 1795 with Josette's maid, Angelique Bouchard (Lara Parker). Josette was never wiser, even to her death. Angelique heard from Barnabas that he still intended to wed Josette and that Angelique was the merest of flings. This news angered Angelique and she hexed Jeremiah, placing him in her thrall so he would marry Josette instead.

On the evening of Barnabas' and Josette's wedding, under the influence of Angelique, Josette and Jeremiah giddily eloped. Later, feeling guilty or perhaps the spell's effects had weakened, they returned to the Collins' family house to face the consequences of what they had done. After Barnabas learned of their marriage, he challenged Jeremiah to a duel. The family tried to dissuade them, but caught in the passion of the moment, Barnabas insisted it go forward. Jeremiah was mortally wounded; he would later succumb to his wounds at 2:00 A.M.

In the 1991 revival series, Jeremiah (Adrian Paul) was Barnabas (Ben Cross)'s younger brother. The being hexed by Angelique (Lysette Anthony) and eloping with Josette (Joanna Going) plot is mostly the same but some details were altered. For example, Jeremiah and Josette did not return to home but were located by Barnabas; it was Jeremiah who challenged Barnabas to a duel; Barnabas promised not to harm Jeremiah and was going to keep his word, but Angelique had magically interfered so Jeremiah was killed in the duel.
