= Josette du Pres =

- Dark Shadows character
- Kathryn Leigh Scott portrays Josette
- Portrayed by: Kathryn Leigh Scott (1966–1970); Mary Cooper (1971); Joanna Going (1991); Bella Heathcote (2012)
- First appearance: September 30, 1966
- Last appearance: April 2, 1971
- Created by: Dan Curtis
In-universe information
- Father: Andre du Pres
- Mother: Marie du Pres
- Half-sisters: Angelique Bouchard Collins
- Spouse: Jeremiah Collins (1795); Barnabas Collins (parallel time)
- Sons: Bramwell Collins (parallel time)
- Daughters: Melanie Collins Young (parallel time)
- Aunts: Natalie du Pres

Josette Collins, also known as Josette du Pres, is a fictional character in the American Gothic television soap opera Dark Shadows, which aired from 1966 to 1971 on ABC. In the series' main timeline, she is the benevolent ghost of Jeremiah Collins' young bride, who died by suicide in 1795.

Kathryn Leigh Scott, who had played Maggie Evans since the first episode, doubled as the ghost of Josette duPrés starting with her first appearance in 1966. Josette was played by Mary Cooper in the 1841 parallel timeline story line. Other actresses who substituted as Josette included Rosemary McNamara, Florence Stanley, Natalie Norwich, Dorrie Kavanaugh, and Sandy Mitchell.

== Character background ==
=== Josette and Barnabas ===
Born in 1774 in France, Josette du Pres (Kathryn Leigh Scott)'s widowed father was Andre du Pres (David Ford) a wealthy sugarcane planter on the Caribbean island of Martinique. Raised by her father and her paternal aunt, the Countess Natalie du Pres (Grayson Hall), the lovely and sympathetic Josette came to Collinsport, Maine in 1795 to marry Barnabas Collins (Jonathan Frid).

Though Barnabas had become engaged to Josette following an earlier visit to Martinique, he had there enjoyed a brief dalliance with his fiancée's personal maid, Angélique Bouchard (Lara Parker), who was secretly a powerful witch. When Angélique arrived in Collinsport, she immediately invited Barnabas to rekindle their relationship. However, Barnabas rejected her, declaring that he had always loved Josette but had been unsure of Josette's love for him in Martinique.

Furious with jealousy, Angélique first tried to kill Barnabas and then hexed Josette, so that she fell in love with Barnabas's young uncle, Jeremiah Collins (Anthony George), and he with her. Jeremiah and Josette eloped and were married; this incited Jeremiah and Barnabas to duel, ending in Jeremiah's death. Still under Angélique's spell, Josette disavowed her previous love for Barnabas, exclaiming that she would always love Jeremiah.

=== The Tragedy of Josette ===
Through a series of machinations, Angélique tricked the broken-hearted Barnabas to marry her. But once he discovered his new wife was a witch, Barnabas shot Angélique, planning to reunite with a now more receptive Josette. Believing herself to be dying, the witch cursed Barnabas, who died shortly after and rose as a vampire. His first act as a creature of the night was to strangle Angélique.

Grief-stricken, Josette readied herself to leave Collinsport with Natalie. Once bitten by Barnabas, Josette prepared to become his bride, though she clearly did not understand that Barnabas was now a vampire. Angélique caused Josette to have grotesque visions of herself as a vampire. Realizing at last what Barnabas was asking of her, and horrified and inconsolate, Josette committed suicide by jumping off the precipice at Widow's Hill.

=== The Strange Lives of Josette ===
Barnabas Collins summoned the ghost of his lost love to his side not long after her death. But the now disfigured Josette begged him to be allowed to return to her grave. Horrified, the vampire allowed her to go to her rest. But the spirit of Josette was not yet at peace. Over the years, she was said to haunt the Old House. Often, her ghost was said to warn Collins family members of impending death or other misfortune. During the early days of the series, the ghost of Josette, dressed in white, sometimes appeared to young David Collins (David Henesy).

In a later storyline, the ghost of Quentin Collins (David Selby) killed David and drove the Collins family out of their mansion. Barnabas traveled back in time to 1897 to prevent these events by changing history. During this storyline, he falls in love with Lady Kitty Hampshire (Scott), who resembles Josette. When Barnabas learned that Lady Kitty actually is Josette, they are transported back in time to the night Josette committed suicide. Barnabas managed to prevent Josette from jumping off of Widow's Hill. Unfortunately, Barnabas was soon captured by the Leviathans. Josette became disconsolate at Barnabas' disappearance and committed suicide by drinking poison. In the present (1970), the Leviathans claim that they are keeping Josette hostage in the past, leading Barnabas, Dr. Julia Hoffman (Grayson Hall) and Maggie Evans (Scott) to attempt to contact the spirit of Josette in a séance to learn if she was indeed held prisoner. Josette appears to Barnabas for one final time, telling him that the Leviathans are not holding her prisoner. She parts with Barnabas by telling him to let her go and focus on his own future.

Josette (played by Mary Cooper) re-appeared in the 1841 parallel time storyline. In this alternate reality, Barnabas never became a vampire and married Josette. Barnabas had died but Josette was still alive as an elderly widow. Her son Bramwell (Frid) was the protagonist dealing with a curse placed upon the family by their ancestor Brutus Collins (Louis Edmonds). Josette also had an illegitimate child by Barnabas' cousin Justin Collins (David Hurst) named Melanie (Nancy Barrett). Justin offered to divorce his wife, Flora Collins (Joan Bennett), but Josette insisted he remain married and gave Melanie to Justin and Flora to raise as a foundling. Flora was never aware of Melanie's parentage. Justin's sister, Julia Collins (Grayson Hall) learned years earlier.

== Other appearances ==
The character of Josette then returned in the 2009 audio drama Final Judgement released by Big Finish Productions.

== Character development ==
When Josette was first mentioned in the TV series, her name was established as Josette la Frenière and she was the great grandmother of Elizabeth Collins Stoddard (Bennett) and Roger Collins (Edmonds). Sad and lonely from being shunned by the townspeople of Collinsport for being an outsider, Josette committed suicide by jumping to her death from Widows' Hill in 1834. Jeremiah Collins, angry at his wife for taking her own life, had Josette buried away from the rest of the Collins family in a forlorn spot at Eagle Hill Cemetery. This backstory would be radically changed during the 1795 storyline.

It is heavily implied prior to the events seen in 1795 that Victoria Winters (Alexandra Moltke) has a strong connection to Josette. Characters remark on their physical similarities, and Josette's ghost not only frequently uses Victoria as a medium, but also protects her. At one point, Elizabeth is visibly disturbed when Victoria suggests she herself is related to Josette. Due to technical limitations at the time, it would have been impossible for actress Alexandra Moltke to portray both characters when the series explored the events which turned Barnabas Collins into a vampire. As actress Kathryn Leigh Scott had played the ghost of Josette on occasion, it was only natural for the role to go to her. Any link between Victoria and Josette was quietly forgotten, although the idea that the two characters were connected would be resurrected in the 1991 NBC revival which featured Joanna Going portraying both Victoria and Josette.
