= Ben Martin (photographer) =

American photojournalist

- Born: Benjamin Rush Martin III; September 16, 1930; Salisbury, North Carolina
- Died: February 10, 2017 (aged 86); Salisbury, North Carolina
- Occupations: Photographer, photojournalist
- Years active: 1957–1989
- Spouse: Kathryn Leigh Scott (m. 1971; div. 1990)

Ben Martin (September 16, 1930 – February 10, 2017) was a Time photographer who captured "evocative images that defined the 1960s" in the United States, according to the New York Times.

He died on February 10, 2017, at his home in Salisbury, North Carolina, due to complications from pulmonary fibrosis, according to his former wife, actress Kathryn Leigh Scott.
