= Kathryn Leigh Scott =

American actress

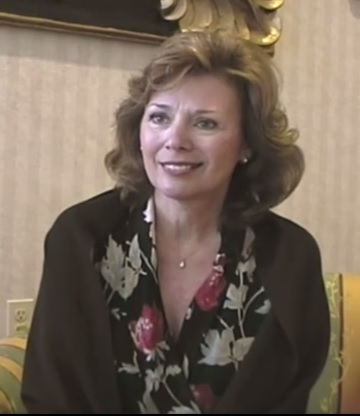
- Scott in 2009
- Occupations: Actress, writer
- Years active: 1966–present
- Spouses: Ben Martin (m. 1971; div. 1990) Geoff Miller (m. 1991; died 2011) Patrick Oster (m. 2025)

Kathryn Leigh Scott is an American television and film actress and writer who is best known for playing several roles on Dark Shadows.

== Early life and education ==
Kathryn Leigh Scott's hometown was Robbinsdale, Minnesota. Her parents, Ole and Hilda Kringstad, were of Norwegian descent.

== Career ==
Scott landed the ingénue lead in the classic gothic daytime drama Dark Shadows (ABC, 1966-1971), and starred in the 1970 MGM feature House of Dark Shadows in 1970. Scott played five roles in the series: Maggie Evans, Maggie Evans Collins (PT), Josette du Pres, Lady Kitty Hampshire and Rachel Drummond.

In 1971, Scott moved to Paris, France, with her fiance, Time/Life photojournalist Ben Martin. In Paris, Scott played twins Penny and Jennifer in the French language miniseries L'alfomega. After marrying later that year in Vikebukt, Norway, she and Martin moved to London, England, where she continued working as an actress. She appeared in several television films and series including Crime of Passion, Harriet's Back In Town, The Turn of the Screw, Marked Personal, Come Die with Me, Dial M for Murder, Space: 1999, and the miniseries Late Call, Edward the King, and Exiles. Scott also appeared in the 1980 British television series Hammer House of Horror episode, "Visitor From The Grave." She also appeared in the feature films Brannigan with John Wayne; Providence with Dirk Bogarde, directed by Alain Resnais; The Great Gatsby, with Robert Redford and Mia Farrow, directed by Jack Clayton; and The Greek Tycoon with Anthony Quinn and Jacqueline Bisset. In 1974, she played Nurse Kelly in a six-month run of Harvey with James Stewart, directed by Sir Anthony Quayle, at the Prince of Wales Theatre, London. The following year she was in a new play, Le Weekend, at the Bristol Old Vic, Bristol, England.

In 1978, Scott moved to Los Angeles to star in the CBS series Big Shamus, Little Shamus with Brian Dennehy. She guest-starred in a succession of television series, and then returned to England to film The Last Days of Patton with George C. Scott; Murrow with Daniel J. Travanti; Voice of the Heart with James Brolin; and Chandlertown with Powers Boothe.

In 1985, Scott launched Pomegranate Press, Ltd. to publish books about the entertainment industry, including guide books, biographies, textbooks and coffee table art books. She wrote The Bunny Years (the 25-year history of Playboy Clubs told through the women who worked as Playboy Bunnies), which was sold to Imagine Entertainment's Brian Grazer. She also co-produced a two-hour special for the A&E network, and a one-hour documentary for BBC One and Canadian TV, based on the book. Pomegranate has published over 50 nonfiction titles, including Scott's books Lobby Cards: The Classic Films (Benjamin Franklin Award for Best Coffee Table Book) and Lobby Cards: The Classic Comedies, both of which were published in the U.K. by Bloomsbury. She published a trade paperback edition of the hardcover Coya Knutson biography Coya Come Home, with a foreword by Walter Mondale (2012).

Scott wrote Dark Shadows Memories, to coincide with the series' 20th anniversary, and Dark Shadows Companion as a 25th anniversary tribute. She has written three novels -- Dark Passages (2012), Down and Out in Beverly Heels (2013), and Jinxed (2015); a memoir, Last Dance at the Savoy (Cumberland Press, 2016); and a trilogy of books on care-giving: Now With You, Now Without, The Happy Hours, and A Welcome Respite (Grand Harbor, 2017).

Scott plays Mamie Eisenhower in the feature film The Eleventh Green (2019) with Campbell Scott. She has also appeared in Three Christs (2018) with Richard Gere and Julianna Margulies, and Woody Allen's A Rainy Day in New York (2018). She appeared in Hallmark Channel's Broadcasting Christmas (2016) and Lifetime's A Wedding to Die For (2017), and has a recurring role as Albert Solomon (George Segal)'s girlfriend Miriam on The Goldbergs. She wrote Dark Shadows: Return to Collinwood (2012), and appeared in a cameo role in the Johnny Depp/Tim Burton film Dark Shadows (2012).

After Scott's divorce from Ben Martin in 1990, they continued as partners in Pomegranate Press and remained close until his death in 2017. Scott married Geoff Miller, founding editor and publisher of Los Angeles magazine in 1991. He died from progressive supranuclear palsy in 2011. Scott is a national volunteer spokesperson for CurePSP.

Scott has served on the Boards of the Beverly Hills Women's Club and the Woman's Club of Hollywood.

== Pomegranate Press ==
In 1986, Scott founded Pomegranate Press, which published her books about Dark Shadows, as well as other books authored by her, including The Bunny Years, about the 25-year history of Playboy Bunnies, and coffee table books on film art. Pomegranate Press has also published books by other authors, mainly nonfiction entertainment titles. Today, she continues to work as an actress (Three Christs with Richard Gere, 2017) and writer (Last Dance At the Savoy, Now With You, Now Without). She reprised a number of her Dark Shadows roles in a series of audio dramas from Big Finish Productions. Scott co-wrote (with Jim Pierson) Dark Shadows: Return to Collinwood, an updated retrospective on the original series, including the Tim Burton remake with Johnny Depp, in which Scott has a cameo role. The book was released on April 3, 2012 via Pomegranate Press.

== Personal life ==
Scott married her first husband, photographer Ben Martin, in 1971. They divorced in 1990, although the two remained business partners in Pomegranate Press. Martin died in February 2017.

In 1991, she married Los Angeles magazine founder Geoff Miller (1936–2011). She and Miller remained together until his death from progressive supranuclear palsy in 2011.

In 2025, she married author and journalist Patrick Oster.

== Filmography ==
Year	Title	Role	Notes
1970	House of Dark Shadows	Maggie Evans	
1974	The Great Gatsby	Catherine	
1975	Brannigan	Miss Allen	
1977	Providence	Miss Boon	
1978	The Gypsy Warriors	Lady Asten-Forbes	
1978	The Greek Tycoon	Nancy Cassidy	
1980	Witches' Brew	Susan Carey	
1987	Assassination	Polly Sims	
1997	One Eight Seven	Anglo Woman	
2008	Parasomnia	Nurse Margaret Evans	
2012	Dark Shadows	Barnabas Guest	
2013	Doctor Mabuse	Madame Von Harbau	
2013	The Rising Light	Aya	
2014	Doctor Mabuse: Etiopomar	Madame Von Harbau	
2017	Three Christs	Victoria Rogers	
2019	A Rainy Day in New York	Wanda	
2019	Loon Lake	Lena Janson	
2020	The 11th Green	Mamie Eisenhower	
2024	The Great Nick D	Helen Zimmerman	

=== Television ===
Year	Title	Role	Notes
1966–1970	Dark Shadows	Maggie Evans*; Josette DuPres Collins (Note: Parallel counterpart played by Mary Cooper during episodes 1206 to 1238.); Rachel Drummond; Kitty Soames; Maggie Evans Collins (PT)	310 episodes
1973	Harriet's Back in Town	Louisa Vernon	2 episodes
1974	The Turn of the Screw	Miss Jessel	TV movie
1976	Space: 1999	Yesta	Episode: "Dorzak"
1978	Hawaii Five-O	Jemilla	Episode: "My Friend, the Enemy"
1979	The Incredible Hulk	Dr. Gail Collins	Episode: "A Solitary Place"
1979	Little House on the Prairie	Belle Harrison	Episode: "Blind Man's Bluff"
1979	Big Shamus, Little Shamus	Stephanie Marsh	10 episodes
1980	Hammer House of Horror	Penny	Episode: "Visitor From The Grave"
1981	Dynasty	Jennifer	2 episodes
1982	Police Squad!	Sally Decker	Episode: "A Substantial Gift (The Broken Promise)"
1983	Philip Marlowe, Private Eye	Annie Riordan	3 episodes
1984	Hardcastle and McCormick	Lenore Alcott	Episode: "Whistler's Pride"
1984	Call to Glory	Elaine Farrell	Episode: "Call It Courage"
1985	Cagney & Lacey	Barbara Cody	Episode: "Play It Again, Santa"
1986	Murrow	Janet Murrow	TV movie
1986	The Last Days of Patton	Jean Gordon	TV movie
1986	The A-Team	Sheriff Ann Plummer	Episode: "The Little Town with an Accent"
1986	Shadow Chasers	Gwen Page	Episode: "Let's Make a Deal"
1987	Hotel	Linda Anderson	Episode: "Hail and Farewell"
1988	Jake and the Fatman	Holly Poole	Episode: "I Guess I'll Have to Change My Plan"
1988	Mr. Belvedere	Woman	Episode: "Hooky"
1988	Paradise	Lucy Cord Carroll	2 episodes
1988	Knots Landing	Architect	Episode: "The Blushing Bride"
1988	Probe	Dr. Deanna Hardwick	Episode: "Metamorphic Anthropoidic Prototype Over You"
1989	Star Trek: The Next Generation	Nuria	Episode: "Who Watches the Watchers"
1989	Dallas	Bunny Harvard	3 episodes
1989	Voice of the Heart	Arlene Mason	TV movie
1989	Matlock	Janice Barelli	2 episodes
1990	Matlock	Judge Marla Cordante	Episode: "The Talk Show"
1990	21 Jump Street	Margaret	Episode: "Change of Heart"
1990	Jake and the Fatman	Denise	Episode: "I Ain't Got No Body"
1999	CI5: The New Professionals	Dr. Sheperd	Episode: "Choice Curts"
2006	Huff	Swanson	Episode: "Which Lip Is the Cervical Lip?"
2013–2014	The Goldbergs	Miriam	2 episodes
2014	Petals on the Wind	Society Lady	TV movie
2014–2016	Old Dogs & New Tricks	Lillianne Carter	2 episodes
2015	Agents of S.H.I.E.L.D.	The Baroness	Episode: "Aftershocks"
2016	Broadcasting Christmas	Ruth Morgan	TV movie
2019	First Wives Club	Judith	Episode: "Pilot"
2019	The Blacklist	Homeowner	Episode: "Dr. Lewis Powell (No. 130)"
2021-2023	Smartphone Theater	Ruth	2 episodes
