= Anthony George =

American actor (1921–2005)

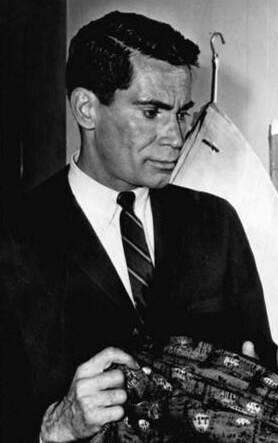
- George as Don Corey in Checkmate (1961)
- Born: Ottavio Gabriel George; January 29, 1921; Endicott, New York, U.S.
- Died: March 16, 2005 (aged 84); Newport Beach, California, U.S.
- Occupation: Actor

Anthony George (born Ottavio Gabriel George; January 29, 1921 – March 16, 2005) was an American actor mostly seen on television. He is best known for roles of Don Corey on Checkmate, Burke Devlin and Jeremiah Collins on Dark Shadows, Dr. Tony Vincente on Search for Tomorrow, and Dr. Will Vernon on One Life to Live.

== Background ==
Anthony George was born in Endicott, New York, near Binghamton, the second son of Italian immigrant parents. From the age of six, George dreamed of being in films. After serving in the Army during World War II, George moved to Hollywood. Though the first few years were lean, by 1950, he had received his first credit and the work began to accumulate. The vast majority of George's roles were on television.

== Career ==
In 1955, George appeared as Sergei in the episode "Mightier Than the Sword" of the religion anthology television series, Crossroads, based on stories about American clergymen. He was cast as a Native American guide in the 1956 episode "Death in the Snow" of NBC's anthology series, The Joseph Cotten Show: On Trial; Cotten later returned the favor, guest-starring in the episode "Face in the Window" of Checkmate. George portrayed Native American roles in the CBS western series, Brave Eagle, starring Keith Larsen in the title role of a young Cheyenne chief who tries to maintain peace with the white community. George was cast in the episodes "The Treachery of At-Ta-Tu" (1955), as Night Wind in "Voice of the Serpent" (1955), and as Red Wing in "Witch Bear" (1956).

In 1957, George appeared as Sancho Mendariz on the TV western Cheyenne in the episode, "The Spanish Grant". On July 31, 1957, George was cast as Nick Frazee, a bank robber who kills a deputy sheriff before making his getaway, in the episode "Hold Up" of the series The Sheriff of Cochise, in which Sheriff Frank Morgan (John Bromfield), based in Cochise County, Arizona, establishes roadblocks in pursuit of Frazee and two of his men, but the fleeing bandits take an isolated road into the mountains.

In 1958, George played Clarence Miller, an escaped mental patient in an episode of Highway Patrol, a police drama starring Broderick Crawford. In January 1959, George played a Catholic priest, Padre John, in the episode "The Desperadoes" of the western series, Sugarfoot. Later in 1959, George was first cast as federal agent Cam Allison in the first season of ABC's The Untouchables, with Robert Stack. He appeared in twelve episodes before he landed his role on Checkmate. After Checkmate ended, he appeared as the title character in "The Johnny Masters Story" episode of Wagon Train.

George's longest-running success came from his decades-long career in daytime soap operas. In 1967, George replaced Mitchell Ryan as the brooding Burke Devlin on Dark Shadows. Some months later, the character was killed in a plane crash, and George created the role of Jeremiah Collins in a flashback to the year 1795. The story ran for most of 1967, until Jeremiah was killed off. George obtained further roles on CBS's Search for Tomorrow (as Dr. Tony Vincente, 1970–75) and One Life to Live (as Dr. Will Vernon). After being written out of One Life to Live in 1984, George continued to make sporadic film and television appearances. In 1988, he played the role of Alex Karides in "Baja, Humbug" in the CBS crime drama, Simon & Simon.

== Death ==
George died of complications from emphysema. The New York Post reported in its edition of Friday, April 1, 2005, “Veteran actor Earl Holliman sent word yesterday that his pal, actor Anthony George, died March 16 in Newport Beach, Calif. He was 84.”.

== Filmography ==
| Year | Title | Role | Notes |
|---|---|---|---|
| 1950 | Black Hand | Footpad | Uncredited |
| 1950 | Under My Skin | Rico | Uncredited |
| 1950 | Love That Brute | Pretty Willie's Bodyguard | Uncredited |
| 1950 | Where the Sidewalk Ends | Scalise Hoodlum | Uncredited |
| 1951 | The Fat Man | Anthony the Wolf | Uncredited |
| 1951 | Inside the Walls of Folsom Prison | Convict Holding Warden Hostage | Uncredited |
| 1951 | You Never Can Tell | Detective Lieutenant Louie Luisetti | |
| 1954 | The Adventures of Hajji Baba | Palace Guard | Uncredited |
| 1954 | The Silver Chalice | Sicarii | Uncredited |
| 1956 | Three Bad Sisters | Tony Cadiz | |
| 1956 | The Ten Commandments | Slave | Uncredited |
| 1957 | Chicago Confidential | Duncan | |
| 1957 | Gunfire at Indian Gap | Juan Morales | |
| 1958 | Alfred Hitchcock Presents | Sasha Ismael | Season 3 Episode 25: "Flight to the East" |
| 1963 | The Alfred Hitchcock Hour | Victor Castillejo | Season 1 Episode 29: "The Dark Pool" |
